= List of tambon in Thailand (K) =

This is a list of tambon (sub-districts) in Thailand, beginning with the letter K. This information is liable to change due to border changes or re-allocation of Tambons. Missing Tambon numbers show where the number is either not used or the Tambon has been transferred to a different Amphoe.

Tambon (sub-district)	ตำบล	Amphoe (district)	อำเภอ	Changwat (province)	จังหวัด	Region
Ka Bin	กาบิน	Kut Khaopun	กุดข้าวปุ้น	Ubon Ratchathani	อุบลราชธานี	North-East
Ka Ko	กาเกาะ	Mueang Surin	เมืองสุรินทร์	Surin	สุรินทร์	North-East
Kabang	กาบัง	Kabang (Malay: Kabae or Kabe)	กาบัง	Yala	ยะลา	South
Kabiat	กะเปียด	Chawang	ฉวาง	Nakhon Si Thammarat	นครศรีธรรมราช	South
Kabin	กบินทร์	Kabin Buri	กบินทร์บุรี	Prachin Buri	ปราจีนบุรี	East
Kabok Tia	กะบกเตี้ย	Noen Kham	เนินขาม	Chai Nat	ชัยนาท	Central
Kachet	กะเฉด	Mueang Rayong	เมืองระยอง	Rayong	ระยอง	East
Kadae	กะแดะ	Kanchanadit	กาญจนดิษฐ์	Surat Thani	สุราษฎร์ธานี	South
Kadunong	กะดุนง	Sai Buri (Malay: Telube or Selindung Bayu)	สายบุรี	Pattani	ปัตตานี	South
Kae	แก	Rattanaburi	รัตนบุรี	Surin	สุรินทร์	North-East
Kae Dam	แกดำ	Kae Dam	แกดำ	Maha Sarakham	มหาสารคาม	North-East
Kae Yai	แกใหญ่	Mueang Surin	เมืองสุรินทร์	Surin	สุรินทร์	North-East
Kaem On	แก้มอ้น	Chom Bueng	จอมบึง	Ratchaburi	ราชบุรี	West
Kaen Makrut	แก่นมะกรูด	Ban Rai	บ้านไร่	Uthai Thani	อุทัยธานี	Central
Kaeng	แก้ง	Det Udom	เดชอุดม	Ubon Ratchathani	อุบลราชธานี	North-East
Kaeng Din So	แก่งดินสอ	Na Di	นาดี	Prachin Buri	ปราจีนบุรี	East
Kaeng Dom	แก่งโดม	Sawang Wirawong	สว่างวีรวงศ์	Ubon Ratchathani	อุบลราชธานี	North-East
Kaeng Hang Maeo	แก่งหางแมว	Kaeng Hang Maeo	แก่งหางแมว	Chanthaburi	จันทบุรี	East
Kaeng Kae	แก้งแก	Kosum Phisai	โกสุมพิสัย	Maha Sarakham	มหาสารคาม	North-East
Kaeng Kai	แก้งไก่	Sangkhom	สังคม	Nong Khai	หนองคาย	North-East
Kaeng Kheng	แก่งเค็ง	Kut Khaopun	กุดข้าวปุ้น	Ubon Ratchathani	อุบลราชธานี	North-East
Kaeng Khoi	แก่งคอย	Kaeng Khoi	แก่งคอย	Saraburi	สระบุรี	Central
Kaeng Kok	แก้งกอก	Si Mueang Mai	ศรีเมืองใหม่	Ubon Ratchathani	อุบลราชธานี	North-East
Kaeng Krachan	แก่งกระจาน	Kaeng Krachan	แก่งกระจาน	Phetchaburi	เพชรบุรี	West
Kaeng Loeng Chan	แก่งเลิงจาน	Mueang Maha Sarakham	เมืองมหาสารคาม	Maha Sarakham	มหาสารคาม	North-East
Kaeng Nuea	แก้งเหนือ	Khemarat	เขมราฐ	Ubon Ratchathani	อุบลราชธานี	North-East
Kaeng Phak Kut	แก่งผักกูด	Tha Luang	ท่าหลวง	Lopburi	ลพบุรี	Central
Kaeng Sanam Nang	แก้งสนามนาง	Kaeng Sanam Nang	แก้งสนามนาง	Nakhon Ratchasima	นครราชสีมา	North-East
Kaeng Si Phum	แก่งศรีภูมิ	Phu Luang	ภูหลวง	Loei	เลย	North-East
Kaeng Sian	แก่งเสี้ยน	Mueang Kanchanaburi	เมืองกาญจนบุรี	Kanchanaburi	กาญจนบุรี	West
Kaeng Sopha	แก่งโสภา	Wang Thong	วังทอง	Phitsanulok	พิษณุโลก	Central
Kaeo Fa	แก้วฟ้า	Bang Sai	บางซ้าย	Phra Nakhon Si Ayutthaya	พระนครศรีอยุธยา	Central
Kaeo Saen	แก้วแสน	Na Bon	นาบอน	Nakhon Si Thammarat	นครศรีธรรมราช	South
Kahad	กะฮาด	Noen Sa-nga	เนินสง่า	Chaiyaphum	ชัยภูมิ	North-East
Kai Kham	ไก่คำ	Mueang Amnat Charoen	เมืองอำนาจเจริญ	Amnat Charoen	อำนาจเจริญ	North-East
Kai Sao	ไก่เส่า	Nong Saeng	หนองแซง	Saraburi	สระบุรี	Central
Kalai	กะไหล	Takua Thung	ตะกั่วทุ่ง	Phang Nga	พังงา	South
Kalantha	กลันทา	Mueang Buriram	เมืองบุรีรัมย์	Buriram	บุรีรัมย์	North-East
Kalase	กะลาเส	Sikao	สิเกา	Trang	ตรัง	South
Kalasin	กาฬสินธุ์	Mueang Kalasin	เมืองกาฬสินธุ์	Kalasin	กาฬสินธุ์	North-East
Kalisa	กาลิซา	Ra-ngae	ระแงะ	Narathiwat	นราธิวาส	South
Kalo	กาลอ	Raman (Malay: Reman)	รามัน	Yala	ยะลา	South
Kalong	กาหลง	Si Sakhon	ศรีสาคร	Narathiwat	นราธิวาส	South
Kalong	กาหลง	Mueang Samut Sakhon	เมืองสมุทรสาคร	Samut Sakhon	สมุทรสาคร	Central
Kaluwo	กะลุวอ	Mueang Narathiwat	เมืองนราธิวาส	Narathiwat	นราธิวาส	South
Kaluwo Nuea	กะลุวอเหนือ	Mueang Narathiwat	เมืองนราธิวาส	Narathiwat	นราธิวาส	South
Kam Pu	ก้ามปู	Phayakkhaphum Phisai	พยัคฆภูมิพิสัย	Maha Sarakham	มหาสารคาม	North-East
Kamala	กมลา	Kathu	กะทู้	Phuket	ภูเก็ต	South
Kamalasai	กมลาไสย	Kamalasai	กมลาไสย	Kalasin	กาฬสินธุ์	North-East
Kamang	กะมัง	Phra Nakhon Si Ayutthaya	พระนครศรีอยุธยา	Phra Nakhon Si Ayutthaya	พระนครศรีอยุธยา	Central
Kamiyo	กะมิยอ	Mueang Pattani (Malay: Patani)	เมืองปัตตานี	Pattani	ปัตตานี	South
Kamlon	กำโลน	Lan Saka	ลานสกา	Nakhon Si Thammarat	นครศรีธรรมราช	South
Kamnoet Nopphakhun	กำเนิดนพคุณ	Bang Saphan	บางสะพาน	Prachuap Khiri Khan	ประจวบคีรีขันธ์	West
Kampang	กำปัง	Non Thai	โนนไทย	Nakhon Ratchasima	นครราชสีมา	North-East
Kamphaeng	กำแพง	La-ngu	ละงู	Satun	สตูล	South
Kamphaeng	กำแพง	Uthumphon Phisai	อุทุมพรพิสัย	Sisaket	ศรีสะเกษ	North-East
Kamphaeng	กำแพง	Kaset Wisai	เกษตรวิสัย	Roi Et	ร้อยเอ็ด	North-East
Kamphaeng Din	กำแพงดิน	Sam Ngam	สามง่าม	Phichit	พิจิตร	Central
Kamphaeng Phet	กำแพงเพชร	Rattaphum	รัตภูมิ	Songkhla	สงขลา	South
Kamphaeng Saen	กำแพงแสน	Kamphaeng Saen	กำแพงแสน	Nakhon Pathom	นครปฐม	Central
Kamphaeng Sao	กำแพงเซา	Mueang Nakhon Si Thammarat	นครศรีธรรมราช	Nakhon Si Thammarat	นครศรีธรรมราช	South
Kamphi	กำพี้	Borabue	บรบือ	Maha Sarakham	มหาสารคาม	North-East
Kamphuan	กำพวน	Suk Samran	สุขสำราญ	Ranong	ระนอง	South
Kan Chu	กันจุ	Bueng Sam Phan	บึงสามพัน	Phetchabun	เพชรบูรณ์	Central
Kan Lueang	ก้านเหลือง	Nang Rong	นางรอง	Buriram	บุรีรัมย์	North-East
Kan Lueang	ก้านเหลือง	Waeng Noi	แวงน้อย	Khon Kaen	ขอนแก่น	North-East
Kan Lueang	ก้านเหลือง	Uthumphon Phisai	อุทุมพรพิสัย	Sisaket	ศรีสะเกษ	North-East
Kan Lueang	ก้านเหลือง	Na Kae	นาแก	Nakhon Phanom	นครพนม	North-East
Kanchana	กาญจนา	Mueang Phrae	เมืองแพร่	Phrae	แพร่	North
Kang Aen	กังแอน	Prasat	ปราสาท	Surin	สุรินทร์	North-East
Kantang	กันตัง	Kantang	กันตัง	Trang	ตรัง	South
Kantang Tai	กันตังใต้	Kantang	กันตัง	Trang	ตรัง	South
Kanthararom	กันทรารมย์	Khukhan	ขุขันธ์	Sisaket	ศรีสะเกษ	North-East
Kantharom	กันทรารมย์	Krasang	กระสัง	Buriram	บุรีรัมย์	North-East
Kanthrom	กันทรอม	Khun Han	ขุนหาญ	Sisaket	ศรีสะเกษ	North-East
Kantuat Ramuan	กันตวจระมวล	Prasat	ปราสาท	Surin	สุรินทร์	North-East
Kao Kham	เก่าขาม	Nam Yuen	น้ำยืน	Ubon Ratchathani	อุบลราชธานี	North-East
Kao Kloi	เก่ากลอย	Na Klang	นากลาง	Nong Bua Lamphu	หนองบัวลำภู	North-East
Kao Liao	เก้าเลี้ยว	Kao Liao	เก้าเลี้ยว	Nakhon Sawan	นครสวรรค์	Central
Kao Ngio	เก่างิ้ว	Phon	พล	Khon Kaen	ขอนแก่น	North-East
Kao Ya Di	เก่าย่าดี	Kaeng Khro	แก้งคร้อ	Chaiyaphum	ชัยภูมิ	North-East
Kap Choeng	กาบเชิง	Kap Choeng	กาบเชิง	Surin	สุรินทร์	North-East
Kapang	กะปาง	Thung Song	ทุ่งสง	Nakhon Si Thammarat	นครศรีธรรมราช	South
Kapao	กะเปา	Khiri Rat Nikhom	คีรีรัฐนิคม	Surat Thani	สุราษฎร์ธานี	South
Kapoe	กะเปอร์	Kapoe	กะเปอร์	Ranong	ระนอง	South
Kapong	กะปง	Kapong	กะปง	Phang Nga	พังงา	South
Karaket	การะเกด	Chian Yai	เชียรใหญ่	Nakhon Si Thammarat	นครศรีธรรมราช	South
Karo	กะหรอ	Nopphitam	นบพิตำ	Nakhon Si Thammarat	นครศรีธรรมราช	South
Karon	กะรน	Mueang Phuket	เมืองภูเก็ต	Phuket	ภูเก็ต	South
Karubi	กะรุบี	Kapho	กะพ้อ	Pattani	ปัตตานี	South
Kasem	เกษม	Trakan Phuet Phon	ตระการพืชผล	Ubon Ratchathani	อุบลราชธานี	North-East
Kasem Sap	เกษมทรัพย์	Pak Thong Chai	ปักธงชัย	Nakhon Ratchasima	นครราชสีมา	North-East
Kaset Phatthana	เกษตรพัฒนา	Ban Phaeo	บ้านแพ้ว	Samut Sakhon	สมุทรสาคร	Central
Kaset Suwan	เกษตรสุวรรณ	Bo Thong	บ่อทอง	Chonburi	ชลบุรี	East
Kaset Wisai	เกษตรวิสัย	Kaset Wisai	เกษตรวิสัย	Roi Et	ร้อยเอ็ด	North-East
Kathu	กะทู้	Kathu	กะทู้	Phuket	ภูเก็ต	South
Kathum	กะทุ่ม	Maha Rat	มหาราช	Phra Nakhon Si Ayutthaya	พระนครศรีอยุธยา	Central
Kathun	กะทูน	Phipun	พิปูน	Nakhon Si Thammarat	นครศรีธรรมราช	South
Ka Tong	กาตอง	Yaha	ยะหา	Yala	ยะลา	South
Kawa	กาวะ	Su-ngai Padi (Malay: Sungai Padi)	สุไหงปาดี	Narathiwat	นราธิวาส	South
Kayo Mati	กาเยาะมาตี	Bacho (Malay: Bahcok)	บาเจาะ	Narathiwat	นราธิวาส	South
Kayu Boko	กายูบอเกาะ	Raman (Malay: Reman)	รามัน	Yala	ยะลา	South
Kayu Khla	กายูคละ	Waeng	แว้ง	Narathiwat	นราธิวาส	South
Kero	เกะรอ	Raman (Malay: Reman)	รามัน	Yala	ยะลา	South
Ketri	เกตรี	Mueang Satun (Malay: Mambang)	เมืองสตูล	Satun	สตูล	South
Kha Mang	ฆะมัง	Mueang Phichit	เมืองพิจิตร	Phichit	พิจิตร	Central
Khae	แข้	Uthumphon Phisai	อุทุมพรพิสัย	Sisaket	ศรีสะเกษ	North-East
Khae	แค	Chana (Malay: Chenok)	จะนะ	Songkhla	สงขลา	South
Khae Ok	แคออก	Bang Sai	บางไทร	Phra Nakhon Si Ayutthaya	พระนครศรีอยุธยา	Central
Khae Rai	แคราย	Krathum Baen	กระทุ่มแบน	Samut Sakhon	สมุทรสาคร	Central
Khae Tok	แคตก	Bang Sai	บางไทร	Phra Nakhon Si Ayutthaya	พระนครศรีอยุธยา	Central
Khaem	แขม	Uthumphon Phisai	อุทุมพรพิสัย	Sisaket	ศรีสะเกษ	North-East
Khaem Son	แคมป์สน	Khao Kho	เขาค้อ	Phetchabun	เพชรบูรณ์	Central
Khaen	แคน	Wapi Pathum	วาปีปทุม	Maha Sarakham	มหาสารคาม	North-East
Khaen Dong	แคนดง	Khaen Dong	แคนดง	Buriram	บุรีรัมย์	North-East
Khaen Nuea	แคนเหนือ	Ban Phai	บ้านไผ่	Khon Kaen	ขอนแก่น	North-East
Khaen Yai	แคนใหญ่	Mueang Roi Et	เมืองร้อยเอ็ด	Roi Et	ร้อยเอ็ด	North-East
Khaen	แคน	Sanom	สนม	Surin	สุรินทร์	North-East
Khai Bok Wan	ค่ายบกหวาน	Mueang Nong Khai	เมืองหนองคาย	Nong Khai	หนองคาย	North-East
Khai Nun	ไค้นุ่น	Huai Phueng	ห้วยผึ้ง	Kalasin	กาฬสินธุ์	North-East
Khai Si	ไคสี	Mueang Bueng Kan	เมืองบึงกาฬ	Bueng Kan	บึงกาฬ	North-East
Khai Si	ไคสี	Bueng Kan	บึงกาฬ	Nong Khai	หนองคาย	North-East
Khalamae	คาละแมะ	Sikhoraphum	ศีขรภูมิ	Surin	สุรินทร์	North-East
Kham Ahuan	คำอาฮวน	Mueang Mukdahan	เมืองมุกดาหาร	Mukdahan	มุกดาหาร	North-East
Kham Bo	คำบ่อ	Waritchaphum	วาริชภูมิ	Sakon Nakhon	สกลนคร	North-East
Kham Bok	คำบก	Khamcha-i	คำชะอี	Mukdahan	มุกดาหาร	North-East
Kham Bong	คำบง	Huai Phueng	ห้วยผึ้ง	Kalasin	กาฬสินธุ์	North-East
Kham Bong	คำบง	Ban Phue	บ้านผือ	Udon Thani	อุดรธานี	North-East
Kham Charoen	คำเจริญ	Trakan Phuet Phon	ตระการพืชผล	Ubon Ratchathani	อุบลราชธานี	North-East
Kham Duang	คำด้วง	Ban Phue	บ้านผือ	Udon Thani	อุดรธานี	North-East
Kham Hai Yai	คำไฮใหญ่	Don Mot Daeng	ดอนมดแดง	Ubon Ratchathani	อุบลราชธานี	North-East
Kham Hai	คำไฮ	Phanom Phrai	พนมไพร	Roi Et	ร้อยเอ็ด	North-East
Kham Kaeo	คำแก้ว	So Phisai	โซ่พิสัย	Bueng Kan	บึงกาฬ	North-East
Kham Kaeo	คำแก้ว	So Phisai	โซ่พิสัย	Nong Khai	หนองคาย	North-East
Kham Khaen	คำแคน	Mancha Khiri	มัญจาคีรี	Khon Kaen	ขอนแก่น	North-East
Kham Khok Sung	คำโคกสูง	Wang Sam Mo	วังสามหมอ	Udon Thani	อุดรธานี	North-East
Kham Khrang	คำครั่ง	Det Udom	เดชอุดม	Ubon Ratchathani	อุบลราชธานี	North-East
Kham Khuean Kaeo	คำเขื่อนแก้ว	Chanuman	ชานุมาน	Amnat Charoen	อำนาจเจริญ	North-East
Kham Khuean Kaeo	คำเขื่อนแก้ว	Sirindhorn	สิรินธร	Ubon Ratchathani	อุบลราชธานี	North-East
Kham Khwang	คำขวาง	Warin Chamrap	วารินชำราบ	Ubon Ratchathani	อุบลราชธานี	North-East
Kham Lai	คำไหล	Si Mueang Mai	ศรีเมืองใหม่	Ubon Ratchathani	อุบลราชธานี	North-East
Kham Lo	คำเลาะ	Chai Wan	ไชยวาน	Udon Thani	อุดรธานี	North-East
Kham Maet	คำแมด	Sam Sung	ซำสูง	Khon Kaen	ขอนแก่น	North-East
Kham Muang	คำม่วง	Khao Suan Kwang	เขาสวนกวาง	Khon Kaen	ขอนแก่น	North-East
Kham Mueat Kaeo	คำเหมือดแก้ว	Huai Mek	ห้วยเม็ก	Kalasin	กาฬสินธุ์	North-East
Kham Na Di	คำนาดี	Phon Thong	โพนทอง	Roi Et	ร้อยเอ็ด	North-East
Kham Na Di	คำนาดี	Mueang Bueng Kan	บึงกาฬ	Bueng Kan	บึงกาฬ	North-East
Kham Na Di	คำนาดี	Bueng Kan	บึงกาฬ	Nong Khai	หนองคาย	North-East
Kham Nam Saep	คำน้ำแซบ	Warin Chamrap	วารินชำราบ	Ubon Ratchathani	อุบลราชธานี	North-East
Kham Niam	คำเนียม	Kanthararom	กันทรารมย์	Sisaket	ศรีสะเกษ	North-East
Kham Pa Lai	คำป่าหลาย	Mueang Mukdahan	เมืองมุกดาหาร	Mukdahan	มุกดาหาร	North-East
Kham Pha-ung	คำพอุง	Pho Chai	โพธิ์ชัย	Roi Et	ร้อยเอ็ด	North-East
Kham Phi	คำพี้	Na Kae	นาแก	Nakhon Phanom	นครพนม	North-East
Kham Phon	คำโพน	Pathum Ratchawongsa	ปทุมราชวงศา	Amnat Charoen	อำนาจเจริญ	North-East
Kham Phong	คำผง	Non Narai	โนนนารายณ์	Surin	สุรินทร์	North-East
Kham Phra	คำพระ	Hua Taphan	หัวตะพาน	Amnat Charoen	อำนาจเจริญ	North-East
Kham Phran	คำพราน	Wang Muang	วังม่วง	Saraburi	สระบุรี	Central
Kham Pia	ขามเปี้ย	Pho Chai	โพธิ์ชัย	Roi Et	ร้อยเอ็ด	North-East
Kham Pia	ขามเปี้ย	Trakan Phuet Phon	ตระการพืชผล	Ubon Ratchathani	อุบลราชธานี	North-East
Kham Pom	ขามป้อม	Wapi Pathum	วาปีปทุม	Maha Sarakham	มหาสารคาม	North-East
Kham Pom	ขามป้อม	Khemarat	เขมราฐ	Ubon Ratchathani	อุบลราชธานี	North-East
Kham Pom	ขามป้อม	Pueai Noi	เปือยน้อย	Khon Kaen	ขอนแก่น	North-East
Kham Pom	ขามป้อม	Phra Yuen	พระยืน	Khon Kaen	ขอนแก่น	North-East
Kham Pom	ขามป้อม	Samrong	สำโรง	Ubon Ratchathani	อุบลราชธานี	North-East
Kham Rian	ขามเรียน	Yang Sisurat	ยางสีสุราช	Maha Sarakham	มหาสารคาม	North-East
Kham Riang	ขามเรียง	Kantharawichai	กันทรวิชัย	Maha Sarakham	มหาสารคาม	North-East
Kham Sa-at	คำสะอาด	Sawang Daen Din	สว่างแดนดิน	Sakon Nakhon	สกลนคร	North-East
Kham Sakaesaeng	ขามสะแกแสง	Kham Sakaesaeng	ขามสะแกแสง	Nakhon Ratchasima	นครราชสีมา	North-East
Kham Sang Thiang	คำสร้างเที่ยง	Sam Chai	สามชัย	Kalasin	กาฬสินธุ์	North-East
Kham Sombun	ขามสมบูรณ์	Khong	คง	Nakhon Ratchasima	นครราชสีมา	North-East
Kham Ta Kla	คำตากล้า	Kham Ta Kla	คำตากล้า	Sakon Nakhon	สกลนคร	North-East
Kham Tanot	คำโตนด	Prachantakham	ประจันตคาม	Prachin Buri	ปราจีนบุรี	East
Kham Thale So	ขามทะเลสอ	Kham Thale So	ขามทะเลสอ	Nakhon Ratchasima	นครราชสีมา	North-East
Kham Thao	ขามเฒ่า	Non Sung	โนนสูง	Nakhon Ratchasima	นครราชสีมา	North-East
Kham Thao	ขามเฒ่า	Mueang Nakhon Phanom	เมืองนครพนม	Nakhon Phanom	นครพนม	North-East
Kham Thao Phatthana	ขามเฒ่าพัฒนา	Kantharawichai	กันทรวิชัย	Maha Sarakham	มหาสารคาม	North-East
Kham Toei	คำเตย	Mueang Nakhon Phanom	เมืองนครพนม	Nakhon Phanom	นครพนม	North-East
Kham Wa	คำหว้า	Tan Sum	ตาลสุม	Ubon Ratchathani	อุบลราชธานี	North-East
Kham Yai	ขามใหญ่	Mueang Ubon Ratchathani	เมืองอุบลราชธานี	Ubon Ratchathani	อุบลราชธานี	North-East
Kham Yai	คำใหญ่	Huai Mek	ห้วยเม็ก	Kalasin	กาฬสินธุ์	North-East
Kham Yat	คำหยาด	Pho Thong	โพธิ์ทอง	Ang Thong	อ่างทอง	Central
Khamang	ฆะมัง	Chum Saeng	ชุมแสง	Nakhon Sawan	นครสวรรค์	Central
Khamcha-i	คำชะอี	Khamcha-i	คำชะอี	Mukdahan	มุกดาหาร	North-East
Khamin	ขมิ้น	Mueang Kalasin	เมืองกาฬสินธุ์	Kalasin	กาฬสินธุ์	North-East
Khamin	ขมิ้น	Mueang Sakon Nakhon	เมืองสกลนคร	Sakon Nakhon	สกลนคร	North-East
Khamong	โขมง	Tha Mai	ท่าใหม่	Chanthaburi	จันทบุรี	East
Khan Chong	คันโช้ง	Wat Bot	วัดโบสถ์	Phitsanulok	พิษณุโลก	Central
Khan Ham	คานหาม	Uthai	อุทัย	Phra Nakhon Si Ayutthaya	พระนครศรีอยุธยา	Central
Khan Na Yao	คันนายาว	Khet Khan Na Yao	คันนายาว	Bangkok	กรุงเทพมหานคร	Central
Khan Ngoen	ขันเงิน	Lang Suan	หลังสวน	Chumphon	ชุมพร	South
Khan Rai	คันไร่	Sirindhorn	สิรินธร	Ubon Ratchathani	อุบลราชธานี	North-East
Khan Thuli	คันธุลี	Tha Chana	ท่าชนะ	Surat Thani	สุราษฎร์ธานี	South
Khanap Nak	ขนาบนาก	Pak Phanang	ปากพนัง	Nakhon Si Thammarat	นครศรีธรรมราช	South
Khane Chue	ขะเนจื้อ	Mae Ramat	แม่ระมาด	Tak	ตาก	West
Khang Phlu	ค้างพลู	Non Thai	โนนไทย	Nakhon Ratchasima	นครราชสีมา	North-East
Khanom	ขนอม	Khanom	ขนอม	Nakhon Si Thammarat	นครศรีธรรมราช	South
Khanon Luang	ขนอนหลวง	Bang Pa-in	บางปะอิน	Phra Nakhon Si Ayutthaya	พระนครศรีอยุธยา	Central
Khanong Phra	ขนงพระ	Pak Chong	ปากช่อง	Nakhon Ratchasima	นครราชสีมา	North-East
Khanthararat	คันธารราษฎร์	Kantharawichai	กันทรวิชัย	Maha Sarakham	มหาสารคาม	North-East
Khanuan	ขนวน	Nong Na Kham	หนองนาคำ	Khon Kaen	ขอนแก่น	North-East
Khanun	ขนุน	Kantharalak	กันทรลักษ์	Sisaket	ศรีสะเกษ	North-East
Khao Baisi	เขาบายศรี	Tha Mai	ท่าใหม่	Chanthaburi	จันทบุรี	East
Khao Bang Kraek	เขาบางแกรก	Nong Chang	หนองฉาง	Uthai Thani	อุทัยธานี	Central
Khao Cha-ngum	เขาชะงุ้ม	Photharam	โพธาราม	Ratchaburi	ราชบุรี	West
Khao Chai Rat	เขาไชยราช	Phato	พะโต๊ะ	Chumphon	ชุมพร	South
Khao Chai Thong	เขาชายธง	Tak Fa	ตากฟ้า	Nakhon Sawan	นครสวรรค์	Central
Khao Chaison	เขาชัยสน	Khao Chaison	เขาชัยสน	Phatthalung	พัทลุง	South
Khao Chakan	เขาฉกรรจ์	Khao Chakan	เขาฉกรรจ์	Sa Kaeo	สระแก้ว	East
Khao Chao	เขาจ้าว	Pran Buri	ปราณบุรี	Prachuap Khiri Khan	ประจวบคีรีขันธ์	West
Khao Chet Luk	เขาเจ็ดลูก	Thap Khlo	ทับคล้อ	Phichit	พิจิตร	Central
Khao Chiak	เขาเจียก	Mueang Phatthalung	เมืองพัทลุง	Phatthalung	พัทลุง	South
Khao Chon Kan	เขาชนกัน	Mae Wong	แม่วงก์	Nakhon Sawan	นครสวรรค์	Central
Khao Chot	เขาโจด	Si Sawat	ศรีสวัสดิ์	Kanchanaburi	กาญจนบุรี	West
Khao Daeng	เขาแดง	Kui Buri	กุยบุรี	Prachuap Khiri Khan	ประจวบคีรีขันธ์	West
Khao Daeng	เขาแดง	Saba Yoi (Malay: Sebayu)	สะบ้าย้อย	Songkhla	สงขลา	South
Khao Din	เขาดิน	Bang Pakong	บางปะกง	Chachoengsao	ฉะเชิงเทรา	East
Khao Din	เขาดิน	Khao Phanom	เขาพนม	Krabi	กระบี่	South
Khao Din	เขาดิน	Doem Bang Nang Buat	เดิมบางนางบวช	Suphan Buri	สุพรรณบุรี	Central
Khao Din	เขาดิน	Kao Liao	เก้าเลี้ยว	Nakhon Sawan	นครสวรรค์	Central
Khao Din	เขาดิน	Nong Saeng	หนองแซง	Saraburi	สระบุรี	Central
Khao Din Nuea	เขาดินเหนือ	Ban Kruat	บ้านกรวด	Buriram	บุรีรัมย์	North-East
Khao Din Phatthana	เขาดินพัฒนา	Chaloem Phra Kiat	เฉลิมพระเกียรติ	Saraburi	สระบุรี	Central
Khao Hin Son	เขาหินซ้อน	Phanom Sarakham	พนมสารคาม	Chachoengsao	ฉะเชิงเทรา	East
Khao Hua Khwai	เขาหัวควาย	Phunphin	พุนพิน	Surat Thani	สุราษฎร์ธานี	South
Khao Kaeo	เขาแก้ว	Lan Saka	ลานสกา	Nakhon Si Thammarat	นครศรีธรรมราช	South
Khao Kaeo	เขาแก้ว	Tha Mai	ท่าใหม่	Chanthaburi	จันทบุรี	East
Khao Kaeo	เขาแก้ว	Sapphaya	สรรพยา	Chai Nat	ชัยนาท	Central
Khao Kaeo	เขาแก้ว	Chiang Khan	เชียงคาน	Loei	เลย	North-East
Khao Kaeo Si Sombun	เขาแก้วศรีสมบูรณ์	Thung Saliam	ทุ่งเสลี่ยม	Sukhothai	สุโขทัย	Central
Khao Kala	เขากะลา	Phayuha Khiri	พยุหะคีรี	Nakhon Sawan	นครสวรรค์	Central
Khao Khai	เขาค่าย	Sawi	สวี	Chumphon	ชุมพร	South
Khao Khao	เขาขาว	Thung Song	ทุ่งสง	Nakhon Si Thammarat	นครศรีธรรมราช	South
Khao Khao	เขาขาว	La-ngu	ละงู	Satun	สตูล	South
Khao Khao	เขาขาว	Huai Yot	ห้วยยอด	Trang	ตรัง	South
Khao Khen	เขาเขน	Plai Phraya	ปลายพระยา	Krabi	กระบี่	South
Khao Khi Foi	เขาขี้ฝอย	Thap Than	ทัพทัน	Uthai Thani	อุทัยธานี	Central
Khao Khirit	เขาคีริส	Phran Kratai	พรานกระต่าย	Kamphaeng Phet	กำแพงเพชร	Central
Khao Khlung	เขาขลุง	Ban Pong	บ้านโป่ง	Ratchaburi	ราชบุรี	West
Khao Kho	เขาค้อ	Khao Kho	เขาค้อ	Phetchabun	เพชรบูรณ์	Central
Khao Khok	เขาคอก	Prakhon Chai	ประโคนชัย	Buriram	บุรีรัมย์	North-East
Khao Khram	เขาคราม	Mueang Krabi	เมืองกระบี่	Krabi	กระบี่	South
Khao Kop	เขากอบ	Huai Yot	ห้วยยอด	Trang	ตรัง	South
Khao Krapuk	เขากระปุก	Tha Yang	ท่ายาง	Phetchaburi	เพชรบุรี	West
Khao Kwang Thong	เขากวางทอง	Nong Chang	หนองฉาง	Uthai Thani	อุทัยธานี	Central
Khao Laem	เขาแหลม	Chai Badan	ชัยบาดาล	Lopburi	ลพบุรี	Central
Khao Lan	เขาล้าน	Thap Sakae	ทับสะแก	Prachuap Khiri Khan	ประจวบคีรีขันธ์	West
Khao Luang	เขาหลวง	Wang Saphung	วังสะพุง	Loei	เลย	North-East
Khao Mai Kaeo	เขาไม้แก้ว	Kabin Buri	กบินทร์บุรี	Prachin Buri	ปราจีนบุรี	East
Khao Mai Kaeo	เขาไม้แก้ว	Sikao	สิเกา	Trang	ตรัง	South
Khao Mai Kaeo	เขาไม้แก้ว	Bang Lamung	บางละมุง	Chonburi	ชลบุรี	East
Khao Mao	ข้าวเม่า	Uthai	อุทัย	Phra Nakhon Si Ayutthaya	พระนครศรีอยุธยา	Central
Khao Mi Kiat	เขามีเกียรติ	Sadao (Malay: Sendawa)	สะเดา	Songkhla	สงขลา	South
Khao Ngam	ข้าวงาม	Wang Noi	วังน้อย	Phra Nakhon Si Ayutthaya	พระนครศรีอยุธยา	Central
Khao Niphan	เขานิพันธ์	Wiang Sa	เวียงสระ	Surat Thani	สุราษฎร์ธานี	South
Khao Niwet	เขานิเวศน์	Mueang Ranong	เมืองระนอง	Ranong	ระนอง	South
Khao Noi	เขาน้อย	Pran Buri	ปราณบุรี	Prachuap Khiri Khan	ประจวบคีรีขันธ์	West
Khao Noi	เขาน้อย	Wiang Kao	เวียงเก่า	Khon Kaen	ขอนแก่น	North-East
Khao Noi	เขาน้อย	Khao Chamao	เขาชะเมา	Rayong	ระยอง	East
Khao Noi	เขาน้อย	Lam Sonthi	ลำสนธิ	Lopburi	ลพบุรี	Central
Khao Noi	เขาน้อย	Tha Muang	ท่าม่วง	Kanchanaburi	กาญจนบุรี	West
Khao Noi	เขาน้อย	Sichon	สิชล	Nakhon Si Thammarat	นครศรีธรรมราช	South
Khao Phang	เขาพัง	Ban Ta Khun	บ้านตาขุน	Surat Thani	สุราษฎร์ธานี	South
Khao Phang Krai	เขาพังไกร	Hua Sai	หัวไทร	Nakhon Si Thammarat	นครศรีธรรมราช	South
Khao Phanom	เขาพนม	Khao Phanom	เขาพนม	Krabi	กระบี่	South
Khao Phoem	เขาเพิ่ม	Ban Na	บ้านนา	Nakhon Nayok	นครนายก	Central
Khao Phra	เขาพระ	Doem Bang Nang Buat	เดิมบางนางบวช	Suphan Buri	สุพรรณบุรี	Central
Khao Phra	เขาพระ	Mueang Nakhon Nayok	เมืองนครนายก	Nakhon Nayok	นครนายก	Central
Khao Phra	เขาพระ	Phipun	พิปูน	Nakhon Si Thammarat	นครศรีธรรมราช	South
Khao Phra	เขาพระ	Rattaphum	รัตภูมิ	Songkhla	สงขลา	South
Khao Phra Ngam	เขาพระงาม	Mueang Lopburi	เมืองลพบุรี	Lopburi	ลพบุรี	Central
Khao Phra Non	เขาพระนอน	Yang Talat	ยางตลาด	Kalasin	กาฬสินธุ์	North-East
Khao Phra Thong	เขาพระทอง	Cha-uat	ชะอวด	Nakhon Si Thammarat	นครศรีธรรมราช	South
Khao Phra Bat	เขาพระบาท	Chian Yai	เชียรใหญ่	Nakhon Si Thammarat	นครศรีธรรมราช	South
Khao Phrai	เขาไพร	Ratsada	รัษฎา	Trang	ตรัง	South
Khao Pu	เขาปู่	Si Banphot	ศรีบรรพต	Phatthalung	พัทลุง	South
Khao Pun	เขาปูน	Huai Yot	ห้วยยอด	Trang	ตรัง	South
Khao Raeng	เขาแร้ง	Mueang Ratchaburi	เมืองราชบุรี	Ratchaburi	ราชบุรี	West
Khao Ro	เขาโร	Thung Song	ทุ่งสง	Nakhon Si Thammarat	นครศรีธรรมราช	South
Khao Ruak	เขารวก	Lam Sonthi	ลำสนธิ	Lopburi	ลพบุรี	Central
Khao Rup Chang	เขารูปช้าง	Mueang Songkhla (Malay: Singgora)	เมืองสงขลา	Songkhla	สงขลา	South
Khao Sai	เขาทราย	Tap Khlo	ทับคล้อ	Phichit	พิจิตร	Central
Khao Sam Sip	เขาสามสิบ	Khao Chakan	เขาฉกรรจ์	Sa Kaeo	สระแก้ว	East
Khao Sam Yot	เขาสามยอด	Mueang Lopburi	เมืองลพบุรี	Lopburi	ลพบุรี	Central
Khao Saming	เขาสมิง	Khao Saming	เขาสมิง	Trat	ตราด	East
Khao Samo Khon	เขาสมอคอน	Tha Wung	ท่าวุ้ง	Lopburi	ลพบุรี	Central
Khao Samsip Hap	เขาสามสิบหาบ	Tha Maka	ท่ามะกา	Kanchanaburi	กาญจนบุรี	West
Khao San	ข้าวสาร	Ban Phue	บ้านผือ	Udon Thani	อุดรธานี	North-East
Khao Sok	เขาซก	Nong Yai	หนองใหญ่	Chonburi	ชลบุรี	East
Khao Suan Kwang	เขาสวนกวาง	Khao Suan Kwang	เขาสวนกวาง	Khon Kaen	ขอนแก่น	North-East
Khao Tha Phra	เขาท่าพระ	Mueang Chai Nat	เมืองชัยนาท	Chai Nat	ชัยนาท	Central
Khao Thalu	เขาทะลุ	Sawi	สวี	Chumphon	ชุมพร	South
Khao Than	เขาถ่าน	Tha Chang	ท่าฉาง	Surat Thani	สุราษฎร์ธานี	South
Khao Thong	เขาทอง	Mueang Krabi	เมืองกระบี่	Krabi	กระบี่	South
Khao Thong	เขาทอง	Phayuha Khiri	พยุหะคีรี	Nakhon Sawan	นครสวรรค์	Central
Khao To	เขาต่อ	Plai Phraya	ปลายพระยา	Krabi	กระบี่	South
Khao Tok	เขาตอก	Khian Sa	เคียนซา	Surat Thani	สุราษฎร์ธานี	South
Khao Tum	เขาตูม	Yarang	ยะรัง	Pattani	ปัตตานี	South
Khao Wiset	เขาวิเศษ	Wang Wiset	เขาวิเศษ	Trang	ตรัง	South
Khao Wong	เขาวง	Phra Phutthabat	พระพุทธบาท	Saraburi	สระบุรี	Central
Khao Wong	เขาวง	Ban Ta Khun	บ้านตาขุน	Surat Thani	สุราษฎร์ธานี	South
Khao Wongkot	เขาวงกต	Kaeng Hang Maeo	แก่งหางแมว	Chanthaburi	จันทบุรี	East
Khao Wua	เขาวัว	Tha Mai	ท่าใหม่	Chanthaburi	จันทบุรี	East
Khao Ya	เขาย่า	Si Banphot	ศรีบรรพต	Phatthalung	พัทลุง	South
Khao Yai	เขาใหญ่	Ao Luek	อ่าวลึก	Krabi	กระบี่	South
Khao Yoi	เขาย้อย	Khao Yoi	เขาย้อย	Phetchaburi	เพชรบุรี	West
Khaopun	ข้าวปุ้น	Kut Khaopun	กุดข้าวปุ้น	Ubon Ratchathani	อุบลราชธานี	North-East
Khayung	ขะยูง	Uthumphon Phisai	อุทุมพรพิสัย	Sisaket	ศรีสะเกษ	North-East
Khek Noi	เข็กน้อย	Khao Kho	เขาค้อ	Phetchabun	เพชรบูรณ์	Central
Khemarat	เขมราฐ	Khemarat	เขมราฐ	Ubon Ratchathani	อุบลราชธานี	North-East
Kheng Yai	เค็งใหญ่	Hua Taphan	หัวตะพาน	Amnat Charoen	อำนาจเจริญ	North-East
Khian Sa	เคียนซา	Khian Sa	เคียนซา	Surat Thani	สุราษฎร์ธานี	South
Khilek	ขี้เหล็ก	Mueang Ubon Ratchathani	เมืองอุบลราชธานี	Ubon Ratchathani	อุบลราชธานี	North-East
Khilek	ขี้เหล็ก	Mae Taeng	แม่แตง	Chiang Mai	เชียงใหม่	North
Khilek	ขี้เหล็ก	Nam Khun	น้ำขุ่น	Ubon Ratchathani	อุบลราชธานี	North-East
Khilek	ขี้เหล็ก	Mae Rim	แม่ริม	Chiang Mai	เชียงใหม่	North
Khilek	ขี้เหล็ก	Pathum Rat	ปทุมรัตต์	Roi Et	ร้อยเอ็ด	North-East
Khilek	ขี้เหล็ก	At Samat	อาจสามารถ	Roi Et	ร้อยเอ็ด	North-East
Khiri Khet	คีรีเขต	Than To	ธารโต	Yala	ยะลา	South
Khiri Rat	คีรีราษฎร์	Phop Phra	พบพระ	Tak	ตาก	West
Khiri Wong	คีรีวง	Plai Phraya	ปลายพระยา	Krabi	กระบี่	South
Khlang	คลัง	Mueang Nakhon Si Thammarat	นครศรีธรรมราช	Nakhon Si Thammarat	นครศรีธรรมราช	South
Khli Kling	คลีกลิ้ง	Sila Lat	ศิลาลาด	Sisaket	ศรีสะเกษ	North-East
Khlong Ban Pho	คลองบ้านโพธิ์	Ban Pho	บ้านโพธิ์	Chachoengsao	ฉะเชิงเทรา	East
Khlong Bang Bon	คลองบางบอน	Khet Bang Bon	บางบอน	Bangkok	กรุงเทพมหานคร	Central
Khlong Bang Phran	คลองบางพราน	Khet Bang Bon	บางบอน	Bangkok	กรุงเทพมหานคร	Central
Khlong Cha-un	คลองชะอุ่น	Phanom	พนม	Surat Thani	สุราษฎร์ธานี	South
Khlong Chak Phra	คลองชักพระ	Khet Taling Chan	ตลิ่งชัน	Bangkok	กรุงเทพมหานคร	Central
Khlong Chaloem	คลองเฉลิม	Kong Ra	กงหรา	Phatthalung	พัทลุง	South
Khlong Chan	คลองจั่น	Khet Bang Kapi	บางกะปิ	Bangkok	กรุงเทพมหานคร	Central
Khlong Chanak	คลองฉนาก	Mueang Surat Thani	เมืองสุราษฎร์ธานี	Surat Thani	สุราษฎร์ธานี	South
Khlong Chanuan	คลองฉนวน	Wiang Sa	เวียงสระ	Surat Thani	สุราษฎร์ธานี	South
Khlong Chaokhun Sing	คลองเจ้าคุณสิงห์	Khet Wang Thonglang	วังทองหลาง	Bangkok	กรุงเทพมหานคร	Central
Khlong Chet	คลองเจ็ด	Khlong Luang	คลองหลวง	Pathum Thani	ปทุมธานี	Central
Khlong Chi Lom	คลองชีล้อม	Kantang	กันตัง	Trang	ตรัง	South
Khlong Chik	คลองจิก	Bang Pa-in	บางปะอิน	Phra Nakhon Si Ayutthaya	พระนครศรีอยุธยา	Central
Khlong Chinda	คลองจินดา	Sam Phran	สามพราน	Nakhon Pathom	นครปฐม	Central
Khlong Chuk Krachoe	คลองจุกกระเฌอ	Mueang Chachoengsao	เมืองฉะเชิงเทรา	Chachoengsao	ฉะเชิงเทรา	East
Khlong Daen	คลองแดน	Ranot (Malay: Renut)	ระโนด	Songkhla	สงขลา	South
Khlong Dan	คลองด่าน	Bang Bo	บางบ่อ	Samut Prakan	สมุทรปราการ	Central
Khlong Ha	คลองห้า	Khlong Luang	คลองหลวง	Pathum Thani	ปทุมธานี	Central
Khlong Hae	คลองแห	Hat Yai	หาดใหญ่	Songkhla	สงขลา	South
Khlong Hat	คลองหาด	Khlong Hat	คลองหาด	Sa Kaeo	สระแก้ว	East
Khlong Hin	คลองหิน	Ao Luek	อ่าวลึก	Krabi	กระบี่	South
Khlong Hin Pun	คลองหินปูน	Wang Nam Yen	วังน้ำเย็น	Sa Kaeo	สระแก้ว	East
Khlong Hoi Khong	คลองหอยโข่ง	Khlong Hoi Khong	คลองหอยโข่ง	Songkhla	สงขลา	South
Khlong Hok	คลองหก	Khlong Luang	คลองหลวง	Pathum Thani	ปทุมธานี	Central
Khlong Kai Thuean	คลองไก่เถื่อน	Khlong Hat	คลองหาด	Sa Kaeo	สระแก้ว	East
Khlong Ket	คลองเกตุ	Khok Samrong	โคกสำโรง	Lopburi	ลพบุรี	Central
Khlong Khachen	คลองคะเชนทร์	Mueang Phichit	เมืองพิจิตร	Phichit	พิจิตร	Central
Khlong Kham	คลองขาม	Yang Talat	ยางตลาด	Kalasin	กาฬสินธุ์	North-East
Khlong Khamao	คลองเขม้า	Nuea Khlong	เหนือคลอง	Krabi	กระบี่	South
Khlong Khanak	คลองขนาก	Wiset Chai Chan	วิเศษชัยชาญ	Ang Thong	อ่างทอง	Central
Khlong Khanan	คลองขนาน	Nuea Khlong	เหนือคลอง	Krabi	กระบี่	South
Khlong Khian	คลองเคียน	Takua Thung	ตะกั่วทุ่ง	Phang Nga	พังงา	South
Khlong Khlung	คลองขลุง	Khlong Khlung	ขลุง คลองขลุง	Kamphaeng Phet	กำแพงเพชร	Central
Khlong Khoen	คลองเขิน	Mueang Samut Songkhram	เมืองสมุทรสงคราม	Samut Songkhram	สมุทรสงคราม	Central
Khlong Khoi	คลองข่อย	Pak Kret	ปากเกร็ด	Nonthaburi	นนทบุรี	Central
Khlong Khoi	คลองข่อย	Photharam	โพธาราม	Ratchaburi	ราชบุรี	West
Khlong Khon	คลองโคน	Mueang Samut Songkhram	เมืองสมุทรสงคราม	Samut Songkhram	สมุทรสงคราม	Central
Khlong Khuean	คลองเขื่อน	Khlong Khuean	คลองเขื่อน	Chachoengsao	ฉะเชิงเทรา	East
Khlong Khun	คลองคูณ	Taphan Hin	ตะพานหิน	Phichit	พิจิตร	Central
Khlong Khut	คลองขุด	Tha Mai	ท่าใหม่	Chanthaburi	จันทบุรี	East
Khlong Khut	คลองขุด	Mueang Satun (Malay: Mambang)	เมืองสตูล	Satun	สตูล	South
Khlong Khut	คลองขุด	Ban Pho	บ้านโพธิ์	Chachoengsao	ฉะเชิงเทรา	East
Khlong Khwai	คลองควาย	Sam Khok	สามโคก	Pathum Thani	ปทุมธานี	Central
Khlong Khwang	คลองขวาง	Khet Phasi Charoen	ภาษีเจริญ	Bangkok	กรุงเทพมหานคร	Central
Khlong Khwang	คลองขวาง	Sai Noi	ไทรน้อย	Nonthaburi	นนทบุรี	Central
Khlong Kio	คลองกิ่ว	Ban Bueng	บ้านบึง	Chonburi	ชลบุรี	East
Khlong Kluea	คลองเกลือ	Pak Kret	ปากเกร็ด	Nonthaburi	นนทบุรี	Central
Khlong Krabue	คลองกระบือ	Pak Phanang	ปากพนัง	Nakhon Si Thammarat	นครศรีธรรมราช	South
Khlong Krachaeng	คลองกระแชง	Mueang Phetchaburi	เมืองเพชรบุรี	Phetchaburi	เพชรบุรี	West
Khlong Krachang	คลองกระจัง	Si Thep	ศรีเทพ	Phetchabun	เพชรบูรณ์	Central
Khlong Krachong	คลองกระจง	Sawankhalok	สวรรคโลก	Sukhothai	สุโขทัย	Central
Khlong Kum	คลองกุ่ม	Khet Bueng Kum	บึงกุ่ม	Bangkok	กรุงเทพมหานคร	Central
Khlong Kwang	คลองกวาง	Na Thawi (Malay: Nawi)	นาทวี	Songkhla	สงขลา	South
Khlong La	คลองหลา	Khlong Hoi Khong	คลองหอยโข่ง	Songkhla	สงขลา	South
Khlong Lan Phatthana	คลองลานพัฒนา	Khlong Lan	คลองลาน	Kamphaeng Phet	กำแพงเพชร	Central
Khlong Lu	คลองลุ	Kantang	กันตัง	Trang	ตรัง	South
Khlong Luang Phaeng	คลองหลวงแพ่ง	Mueang Chachoengsao	เมืองฉะเชิงเทรา	Chachoengsao	ฉะเชิงเทรา	East
Khlong Maduea	คลองมะเดื่อ	Krathum Baen	กระทุ่มแบน	Samut Sakhon	สมุทรสาคร	Central
Khlong Mae Lai	คลองแม่ลาย	Mueang Kamphaeng Phet	เมืองกำแพงเพชร	Kamphaeng Phet	กำแพงเพชร	Central
Khlong Mahanak	คลองมหานาค	Khet Pom Prap Sattru Phai	ป้อมปราบศัตรูพ่าย	Bangkok	เชียงราก	Central
Khlong Mai	คลองใหม่	Sam Phran	สามพราน	Nakhon Pathom	นครปฐม	Central
Khlong Mai	คลองใหม่	Yarang	ยะรัง	Pattani	ปัตตานี	South
Khlong Maning	คลองมานิง	Mueang Pattani (Malay: Patani)	เมืองปัตตานี	Pattani	ปัตตานี	South
Khlong Maphlap	คลองมะพลับ	Si Nakhon	ศรีนคร	Sukhothai	สุโขทัย	Central
Khlong Muang	คลองม่วง	Pak Chong	ปากช่อง	Nakhon Ratchasima	นครราชสีมา	North-East
Khlong Mueang	คลองเมือง	Chakkarat	จักราช	Nakhon Ratchasima	นครราชสีมา	North-East
Khlong Na	คลองนา	Mueang Chachoengsao	เมืองฉะเชิงเทรา	Chachoengsao	ฉะเชิงเทรา	East
Khlong Nakhon Nueang Khet	คลองนครเนื่องเขต	Mueang Chachoengsao	เมืองฉะเชิงเทรา	Chachoengsao	ฉะเชิงเทรา	East
Khlong Nam Khem	คลองน้ำเค็ม	Laem Sing	แหลมสิงห์	Chanthaburi	จันทบุรี	East
Khlong Nam Lai	คลองน้ำไหล	Khlong Lan	คลองลาน	Kamphaeng Phet	กำแพงเพชร	Central
Khlong Nam Sai	คลองน้ำใส	Aranyaprathet	อรัญประเทศ	Sa Kaeo	สระแก้ว	East
Khlong Narai	คลองนารายณ์	Mueang Chanthaburi	เมืองจันทบุรี	Chanthaburi	จันทบุรี	East
Khlong Niyom Yattra	คลองนิยมยาตรา	Bang Bo	บางบ่อ	Samut Prakan	สมุทรปราการ	Central
Khlong Noi	คลองน้อย	Pak Phanang	ปากพนัง	Nakhon Si Thammarat	นครศรีธรรมราช	South
Khlong Noi	คลองน้อย	Chai Buri	ชัยบุรี	Surat Thani	สุราษฎร์ธานี	South
Khlong Noi	คลองน้อย	Ban Phraek	บ้านแพรก	Phra Nakhon Si Ayutthaya	พระนครศรีอยุธยา	Central
Khlong Noi	คลองน้อย	Mueang Surat Thani	เมืองสุราษฎร์ธานี	Surat Thani	สุราษฎร์ธานี	South
Khlong Nok Krathung	คลองนกกระทุง	Bang Len	บางเลน	Nakhon Pathom	นครปฐม	Central
Khlong Nueng	คลองหนึ่ง	Khlong Luang	คลองหลวง	Pathum Thani	ปทุมธานี	Central
Khlong Pang	คลองปาง	Ratsada	รัษฎา	Trang	ตรัง	South
Khlong Pha	คลองพา	Tha Chana	ท่าชนะ	Surat Thani	สุราษฎร์ธานี	South
Khlong Phai	คลองไผ่	Sikhio	สีคิ้ว	Nakhon Ratchasima	นครราชสีมา	North-East
Khlong Phikrai	คลองพิไกร	Phran Kratai	พรานกระต่าย	Kamphaeng Phet	กำแพงเพชร	Central
Khlong Phlu	คลองพลู	Nong Yai	หนองใหญ่	Chonburi	ชลบุรี	East
Khlong Phlu	คลองพลู	Khao Khitchakut	เขาคิชฌกูฏ	Chanthaburi	จันทบุรี	East
Khlong Phon	คลองพน	Khlong Thom	คลองท่อม	Krabi	กระบี่	South
Khlong Phra Udom	คลองพระอุดม	Pak Kret	ปากเกร็ด	Nonthaburi	นนทบุรี	Central
Khlong Phra Udom	คลองพระอุดม	Lat Lum Kaeo	ลาดหลุมแก้ว	Pathum Thani	ปทุมธานี	Central
Khlong Phraya Banlue	คลองพระยาบันลือ	Lat Bua Luang	ลาดบัวหลวง	Phra Nakhon Si Ayutthaya	พระนครศรีอยุธยา	Central
Khlong Pia	คลองเปียะ	Chana (Malay: Chenok)	จะนะ	Songkhla	สงขลา	South
Khlong Prap	คลองปราบ	Ban Nà Sản	บ้านนาสาร	Surat Thani	สุราษฎร์ธานี	South
Khlong Prasong	คลองประสงค์	Mueang Krabi	เมืองกระบี่	Krabi	กระบี่	South
Khlong Prawet	คลองประเวศ	Ban Pho	บ้านโพธิ์	Chachoengsao	ฉะเชิงเทรา	East
Khlong Preng	คลองเปรง	Mueang Chachoengsao	เมืองฉะเชิงเทรา	Chachoengsao	ฉะเชิงเทรา	East
Khlong Pun	คลองปูน	Klaeng	แกลง	Rayong	ระยอง	East
Khlong Rang	คลองหรัง	Na Mom	นาหม่อม	Songkhla	สงขลา	South
Khlong Ri	คลองรี	Sathing Phra	สทิงพระ	Songkhla	สงขลา	South
Khlong Ruea	คลองเรือ	Wihan Daeng	วิหารแดง	Saraburi	สระบุรี	Central
Khlong Sa Bua	คลองสระบัว	Phra Nakhon Si Ayutthaya	พระนครศรีอยุธยา	Phra Nakhon Si Ayutthaya	พระนครศรีอยุธยา	Central
Khlong Sa	คลองสระ	Kanchanadit	กาญจนดิษฐ์	Surat Thani	สุราษฎร์ธานี	South
Khlong Sai Khao	คลองทรายขาว	Kong Ra	กงหรา	Phatthalung	พัทลุง	South
Khlong Sai	คลองทราย	Sak Lek	สากเหล็ก	Phichit	พิจิตร	Central
Khlong Sai	คลองทราย	Na Thawi (Malay: Nawi)	นาทวี	Songkhla	สงขลา	South
Khlong Sai	คลองไทร	Tha Chang	ท่าฉาง	Surat Thani	สุราษฎร์ธานี	South
Khlong Sakae	คลองสะแก	Nakhon Luang	นครหลวง	Phra Nakhon Si Ayutthaya	พระนครศรีอยุธยา	Central
Khlong Sam	คลองสาม	Khlong Luang	คลองหลวง	Pathum Thani	ปทุมธานี	Central
Khlong Sam Prawet	คลองสามประเวศ	Khet Lat Krabang	ลาดกระบัง	Bangkok	กรุงเทพมหานคร	Central
Khlong San	คลองสาน	Khet Khlong San	คลองสาน	Bangkok	กรุงเทพมหานคร	Central
Khlong Se	คลองเส	Tham Phannara	ถ้ำพรรณรา	Nakhon Si Thammarat	นครศรีธรรมราช	South
Khlong Si	คลองสี่	Khlong Luang	คลองหลวง	Pathum Thani	ปทุมธานี	Central
Khlong Sip	คลองสิบ	Khet Nong Chok	หนองจอก	Bangkok	กรุงเทพมหานคร	Central
Khlong Sip Song	คลองสิบสอง	Khet Nong Chok	หนองจอก	Bangkok	กรุงเทพมหานคร	Central
Khlong Sok	คลองศก	Phanom	พนม	Surat Thani	สุราษฎร์ธานี	South
Khlong Sombun	คลองสมบูรณ์	Khlong Khlung	ขลุง คลองขลุง	Kamphaeng Phet	กำแพงเพชร	Central
Khlong Song	คลองสอง	Khlong Luang	คลองหลวง	Pathum Thani	ปทุมธานี	Central
Khlong Song Ton Nun	คลองสองต้นนุ่น	Khet Lat Krabang	ลาดกระบัง	Bangkok	กรุงเทพมหานคร	Central
Khlong Suan	คลองสวน	Bang Bo	บางบ่อ	Samut Prakan	สมุทรปราการ	Central
Khlong Suan Phlu	คลองสวนพลู	Phra Nakhon Si Ayutthaya	พระนครศรีอยุธยา	Phra Nakhon Si Ayutthaya	พระนครศรีอยุธยา	Central
Khlong Ta Khot	คลองตาคต	Photharam	โพธาราม	Ratchaburi	ราชบุรี	West
Khlong Takhian	คลองตะเคียน	Phra Nakhon Si Ayutthaya	พระนครศรีอยุธยา	Phra Nakhon Si Ayutthaya	พระนครศรีอยุธยา	Central
Khlong Takrao	คลองตะเกรา	Tha Takiap	ท่าตะเกีย	Chachoengsao	ฉะเชิงเทรา	East
Khlong Tamru	คลองตำหรุ	Mueang Chonburi	เมืองชลบุรี	Chonburi	ชลบุรี	East
Khlong Tan	คลองตัน	Khlong Toei	คลองเตย	Bangkok	กรุงเทพมหานคร	Central
Khlong Tan	คลองตัน	Ban Phaeo	บ้านแพ้ว	Samut Sakhon	สมุทรสาคร	Central
Khlong Tan	คลองตาล	Si Samrong	ศรีสำโรง	Sukhothai	สุโขทัย	Central
Khlong Tan Nuea	คลองตันเหนือ	Khet Watthana	วัฒนา	Bangkok	กรุงเทพมหานคร	Central
Khlong Thanon	คลองถนน	Khet Sai Mai	สายไหม	Bangkok	กรุงเทพมหานคร	Central
Khlong Thap Chan	คลองทับจันทร์	Aranyaprathet	อรัญประเทศ	Sa Kaeo	สระแก้ว	East
Khlong Thom Nuea	คลองท่อมเหนือ	Khlong Thom	คลองท่อม	Krabi	กระบี่	South
Khlong Thom Tai	คลองท่อมใต้	Khlong Thom	คลองท่อม	Krabi	กระบี่	South
Khlong Toei	คลองเตย	Khlong Toei	คลองเตย	Bangkok	กรุงเทพมหานคร	Central
Khlong Toei Nuea	คลองเตยเหนือ	Watthana	วัฒนา	Bangkok	กรุงเทพมหานคร	Central
Khlong Ton Sai	คลองต้นไทร	Khet Khlong San	คลองสาน	Bangkok	กรุงเทพมหานคร	Central
Khlong U Taphao	คลองอู่ตะเภา	Hat Yai	หาดใหญ่	Songkhla	สงขลา	South
Khlong Udom Chonlachon	คลองอุดมชลจร	Mueang Chachoengsao	เมืองฉะเชิงเทรา	Chachoengsao	ฉะเชิงเทรา	East
Khlong Wan	คลองวาฬ	Mueang Prachuap Khiri Khan	เมืองประจวบคีรีขันธ์	Prachuap Khiri Khan	ประจวบคีรีขันธ์	West
Khlong Wua	คลองวัว	Mueang Ang Thong	เมืองอ่างทอง	Ang Thong	อ่างทอง	Central
Khlong Ya	คลองยา	Ao Luek	อ่าวลึก	Krabi	กระบี่	South
Khlong Yai	คลองใหญ่	Khlong Yai	คลองใหญ่	Trat	ตราด	East
Khlong Yai	คลองใหญ่	Pong Nam Ron	โป่งน้ำร้อน	Chanthaburi	จันทบุรี	East
Khlong Yai	คลองใหญ่	Ongkharak	องครักษ์	Nakhon Nayok	นครนายก	Central
Khlong Yai	คลองใหญ่	Tamot	ตะโหมด	Phatthalung	พัทลุง	South
Khlong Yai	คลองใหญ่	Laem Ngop	แหลมงอบ	Trat	ตราด	East
Khlong Yang	คลองยาง	Ko Lanta	เกาะลันตา	Krabi	กระบี่	South
Khlong Yang	คลองยาง	Sawankhalok	สวรรคโลก	Sukhothai	สุโขทัย	Central
Khlong Yong	คลองโยง	Phutthamonthon	พุทธมณฑล	Nakhon Pathom	นครปฐม	Central
Khlung	ขลุงขลุง	Khlung	ขลุง	Chanthaburi	จันทบุรี	East
Kho Hong	คอหงส์	Hat Yai	หาดใหญ่	Songkhla	สงขลา	South
Kho Khiao	ค้อเขียว	Waritchaphum	วาริชภูมิ	Sakon Nakhon	สกลนคร	North-East
Kho Khlan	โคคลาน	Ta Phraya	ตาพระยา	Sa Kaeo	สระแก้ว	East
Kho Kho	คอโค	Mueang Surin	เมืองสุรินทร์	Surin	สุรินทร์	North-East
Kho Laen	คอแลน	Buntharik	บุณฑริก	Ubon Ratchathani	อุบลราชธานี	North-East
Kho Noi	ค้อน้อย	Samrong	สำโรง	Ubon Ratchathani	อุบลราชธานี	North-East
Kho Rum	คอรุม	Phichai	พิชัย	Uttaradit	อุตรดิตถ์	North
Kho Sai	คอทราย	Khai Bang Rachan	ค่ายบางระจัน	Sing Buri	สิงห์บุรี	Central
Kho Tai	ค้อใต้	Sawang Daen Din	สว่างแดนดิน	Sakon Nakhon	สกลนคร	North-East
Kho Thong	ค้อทอง	Khueang Nai	เขื่องใน	Ubon Ratchathani	อุบลราชธานี	North-East
Kho Yai	ค้อใหญ่	Phanom Phrai	พนมไพร	Roi Et	ร้อยเอ็ด	North-East
Kho Yai	ค้อใหญ่	Ku Kaeo	กู่แก้ว	Udon Thani	อุดรธานี	North-East
Khoen	เขิน	Nam Kliang	น้ำเกลี้ยง	Sisaket	ศรีสะเกษ	North-East
Khoi Sung	ข่อยสูง	Tron	ตรอน	Uttaradit	อุตรดิตถ์	North
Khok Cha-ngai	โคกชะงาย	Mueang Phatthalung	เมืองพัทลุง	Phatthalung	พัทลุง	South
Khok Chamrae	โคกชำแระ	Thung Si Udom	ทุ่งศรีอุดม	Ubon Ratchathani	อุบลราชธานี	North-East
Khok Chan	โคกจาน	Uthumphon Phisai	อุทุมพรพิสัย	Sisaket	ศรีสะเกษ	North-East
Khok Chan	โคกจาน	Trakan Phuet Phon	ตระการพืชผล	Ubon Ratchathani	อุบลราชธานี	North-East
Khok Chang	คอกช้าง	Sakhrai	สระใคร	Nong Khai	หนองคาย	North-East
Khok Chang	โคกช้าง	Phak Hai	ผักไห่	Phra Nakhon Si Ayutthaya	พระนครศรีอยุธยา	Central
Khok Chang	โคกช้าง	Bang Sai	บางไทร	Phra Nakhon Si Ayutthaya	พระนครศรีอยุธยา	Central
Khok Chang	โคกช้าง	Doem Bang Nang Buat	เดิมบางนางบวช	Suphan Buri	สุพรรณบุรี	Central
Khok Charoen	โคกเจริญ	Khok Charoen	โคกเจริญ	Lopburi	ลพบุรี	Central
Khok Charoen	โคกเจริญ	Thap Put	ทับปุด	Phang Nga	พังงา	South
Khok Duea	โคกเดื่อ	Phaisali	ไพศาลี	Nakhon Sawan	นครสวรรค์	Central
Khok Faet	โคกแฝด	Khet Nong Chok	หนองจอก	Bangkok	กรุงเทพมหานคร	Central
Khok Han	โคกหาร	Khao Phanom	เขาพนม	Krabi	กระบี่	South
Khok Hin Hae	โคกหินแฮ่	Renu Nakhon	เรณูนคร	Nakhon Phanom	นครพนม	North-East
Khok Kathiam	โคกกะเทียม	Mueang Lopburi	เมืองลพบุรี	Lopburi	ลพบุรี	Central
Khok Kham	โคกขาม	Mueang Samut Sakhon	เมืองสมุทรสาคร	Samut Sakhon	สมุทรสาคร	Central
Khok Khamin	โคกขมิ้น	Wang Saphung	วังสะพุง	Loei	เลย	North-East
Khok Khamin	โคกขมิ้น	Phlapphla Chai	พลับพลาชัย	Buriram	บุรีรัมย์	North-East
Khok Khi Non	โคกขี้หนอน	Phan Thong	พานทอง	Chonburi	ชลบุรี	East
Khok Khian	โคกเคียน	Takua Pa	ตะกั่วป่า	Phang Nga	พังงา	South
Khok Khian	โคกเคียน	Mueang Narathiwat	เมืองนราธิวาส	Narathiwat	นราธิวาส	South
Khok Kho Thao	โคกโคเฒ่า	Mueang Suphanburi	เมืองสุพรรณบุรี	Suphan Buri	สุพรรณบุรี	Central
Khok Khon	โคกคอน	Tha Bo	ท่าบ่อ	Nong Khai	หนองคาย	North-East
Khok Khram	โคกคราม	Bang Pla Ma	บางปลาม้า	Suphan Buri	สุพรรณบุรี	Central
Khok Khruea	โคกเครือ	Nong Kung Si	หนองกุงศรี	Kalasin	กาฬสินธุ์	North-East
Khok Khwai	คอกควาย	Ban Rai	บ้านไร่	Uthai Thani	อุทัยธานี	Central
Khok Klang	โคกกลาง	Phen	เพ็ญ	Udon Thani	อุดรธานี	North-East
Khok Klang	โคกกลาง	Prathai	ประทาย	Nakhon Ratchasima	นครราชสีมา	North-East
Khok Klang	โคกกลาง	Phanom Dong Rak	พนมดงรัก	Surin	สุรินทร์	North-East
Khok Klang	โคกกลาง	Non Sa-at	โนนสะอาด	Udon Thani	อุดรธานี	North-East
Khok Klang	โคกกลาง	Lue Amnat	ลืออำนาจ	Amnat Charoen	อำนาจเจริญ	North-East
Khok Klang	โคกกลาง	Lam Plai Mat	ลำปลายมาศ	Buriram	บุรีรัมย์	North-East
Khok Kloi	โคกกลอย	Takua Thung	ตะกั่วทุ่ง	Phang Nga	พังงา	South
Khok Ko	โคกก่อ	Mueang Maha Sarakham	เมืองมหาสารคาม	Maha Sarakham	มหาสารคาม	North-East
Khok Kok Muang	โคกกกม่วง	Phon Thong	โพนทอง	Roi Et	ร้อยเอ็ด	North-East
Khok Kong	โคกก่ง	Chanuman	ชานุมาน	Amnat Charoen	อำนาจเจริญ	North-East
Khok Kong	โคกก่อง	Samrong	สำโรง	Ubon Ratchathani	อุบลราชธานี	North-East
Khok Kong	โคกก่อง	Mueang Sakon Nakhon	เมืองสกลนคร	Sakon Nakhon	สกลนคร	North-East
Khok Kong	โคกก่อง	Mueang Bueng Kan	บึงกาฬ	Bueng Kan	บึงกาฬ	North-East
Khok Kong	โคกก่อง	Bueng Kan	บึงกาฬ	Nong Khai	หนองคาย	North-East
Khok Krabue	คอกกระบือ	Mueang Samut Sakhon	เมืองสมุทรสาคร	Samut Sakhon	สมุทรสาคร	Central
Khok Krabue	คอกกระบือ	Panare (Malay: Penarik)	ปะนาเระ	Pattani	ปัตตานี	South
Khok Krabueang	โคกกระเบื้อง	Ban Lueam	บ้านเหลื่อม	Nakhon Ratchasima	นครราชสีมา	North-East
Khok Krachai	โคกกระชาย	Khon Buri	ครบุรี	Nakhon Ratchasima	นครราชสีมา	North-East
Khok Kruat	โคกกรวด	Mueang Nakhon Ratchasima	เมืองนครราชสีมา	Nakhon Ratchasima	นครราชสีมา	North-East
Khok Kruat	โคกกรวด	Pak Phli	ปากพลี	Nakhon Nayok	นครนายก	Central
Khok Kung	โคกกุง	Kaeng Khro	แก้งคร้อ	Chaiyaphum	ชัยภูมิ	North-East
Khok Kwang	โคกกว้าง	Bung Khla	บุ่งคล้า	Bueng Kan	บึงกาฬ	North-East
Khok Kwang	โคกกว้าง	Bung Khla	บุ่งคล้า	Nong Khai	หนองคาย	North-East
Khok Lam	โคกล่าม	Lam Plai Mat	ลำปลายมาศ	Buriram	บุรีรัมย์	North-East
Khok Lam	โคกล่าม	Chaturaphak Phiman	จตุรพักตรพิมาน	Roi Et	ร้อยเอ็ด	North-East
Khok Lam	โคกหล่าม	Uthumphon Phisai	อุทุมพรพิสัย	Sisaket	ศรีสะเกษ	North-East
Khok Lam Phan	โคกลำพาน	Mueang Lopburi	เมืองลพบุรี	Lopburi	ลพบุรี	Central
Khok Lek	โคกเหล็ก	Huai Rat	ห้วยราช	Buriram	บุรีรัมย์	North-East
Khok Lo	โคกหล่อ	Mueang Trang	เมืองตรัง	Trang	ตรัง	South
Khok Ma	โคกม้า	Prakhon Chai	ประโคนชัย	Buriram	บุรีรัมย์	North-East
Khok Mai Lai	โคกไม้ลาย	Mueang Prachinburi	เมืองปราจีนบุรี	Prachin Buri	ปราจีนบุรี	East
Khok Makham	โคกมะขาม	Prakhon Chai	ประโคนชัย	Buriram	บุรีรัมย์	North-East
Khok Mamuang	โคกมะม่วง	Pakham	ปะคำ	Buriram	บุรีรัมย์	North-East
Khok Mang Ngoi	โคกมั่งงอย	Khon Sawan	คอนสวรรค์	Chaiyaphum	ชัยภูมิ	North-East
Khok Mo	โคกหม้อ	Thap Than	ทัพทัน	Uthai Thani	อุทัยธานี	Central
Khok Mo	โคกหม้อ	Mueang Ratchaburi	เมืองราชบุรี	Ratchaburi	ราชบุรี	West
Khok Mo	โคกหม้อ	Chum Saeng	ชุมแสง	Nakhon Sawan	นครสวรรค์	Central
Khok Mon	โคกมน	Nam Nao	น้ำหนาว	Phetchabun	เพชรบูรณ์	Central
Khok Muang	โคกม่วง	Phachi	ภาชี	Phra Nakhon Si Ayutthaya	พระนครศรีอยุธยา	Central
Khok Muang	โคกม่วง	Khlong Hoi Khong	คลองหอยโข่ง	Songkhla	สงขลา	South
Khok Muang	โคกม่วง	Khao Chaison	เขาชัยสน	Phatthalung	พัทลุง	South
Khok Muang	โคกม่วง	Non Sang	โนนสัง	Nong Bua Lamphu	หนองบัวลำภู	North-East
Khok Ngam	โคกงาม	Dan Sai	ด่านซ้าย	Loei	เลย	North-East
Khok Ngam	โคกงาม	Ban Fang	บ้านฝาง	Khon Kaen	ขอนแก่น	North-East
Khok Phet	โคกเพชร	Khukhan	ขุขันธ์	Sisaket	ศรีสะเกษ	North-East
Khok Phet Phatthana	โคกเพชรพัฒนา	Bamnet Narong	บำเหน็จณรงค์	Chaiyaphum	ชัยภูมิ	North-East
Khok Phlo	โคกเพลาะ	Phanat Nikhom	พนัสนิคม	Chonburi	ชลบุรี	East
Khok Pho	โคกโพธิ์	Khok Pho	โคกโพธิ์	Pattani	ปัตตานี	South
Khok Phra	โคกพระ	Kantharawichai	กันทรวิชัย	Maha Sarakham	มหาสารคาม	North-East
Khok Phra Chedi	โคกพระเจดีย์	Nakhon Chai Si	นครชัยศรี	Nakhon Pathom	นครปฐม	Central
Khok Phu	โคกภู	Phu Phan	ภูพาน	Sakon Nakhon	สกลนคร	North-East
Khok Phutsa	โคกพุทรา	Pho Thong	โพธิ์ทอง	Ang Thong	อ่างทอง	Central
Khok Pi Khong	โคกปี่ฆ้อง	Mueang Sa Kaeo	เมืองสระแก้ว	Sa Kaeo	สระแก้ว	East
Khok Pip	โคกปีบ	Si Mahosot	ศรีมโหสถ	Prachin Buri	ปราจีนบุรี	East
Khok Prong	โคกปรง	Wichian Buri	วิเชียรบุรี	Phetchabun	เพชรบูรณ์	Central
Khok Roeng Rom	โคกเริงรมย์	Bamnet Narong	บำเหน็จณรงค์	Chaiyaphum	ชัยภูมิ	North-East
Khok Sa-at	โคกสะอาด	Mueang Udon Thani	เมืองอุดรธานี	Udon Thani	อุดรธานี	North-East
Khok Sa-at	โคกสะอาด	Khong Chai	ฆ้องชัย	Kalasin	กาฬสินธุ์	North-East
Khok Sa-at	โคกสะอาด	Nong Bua Rawe	หนองบัวระเหว	Chaiyaphum	ชัยภูมิ	North-East
Khok Sa-at	โคกสะอาด	Nam Khun	น้ำขุ่น	Ubon Ratchathani	อุบลราชธานี	North-East
Khok Sa-at	โคกสะอาด	Si Thep	ศรีเทพ	Phetchabun	เพชรบูรณ์	Central
Khok Sa-at	โคกสะอาด	Nong Saeng	หนองแซง	Saraburi	สระบุรี	Central
Khok Sa-at	โคกสะอาด	Phu Khiao	ภูเขียว	Chaiyaphum	ชัยภูมิ	North-East
Khok Sa-at	โคกสะอาด	Lam Plai Mat	ลำปลายมาศ	Buriram	บุรีรัมย์	North-East
Khok Sa-at	โคกสะอาด	Prasat	ปราสาท	Surin	สุรินทร์	North-East
Khok Sa-nga	โคกสง่า	Phon	พล	Khon Kaen	ขอนแก่น	North-East
Khok Saba	โคกสะบ้า	Na Yong	นาโยง	Trang	ตรัง	South
Khok Sai	โคกทราย	Pa Bon	ป่าบอน	Phatthalung	พัทลุง	South
Khok Sak	โคกสัก	Bang Kaeo	บางแก้ว	Phatthalung	พัทลุง	South
Khok Salung	โคกสลุง	Phatthana Nikhom	พัฒนานิคม	Lopburi	ลพบุรี	Central
Khok Salut	โคกสลุด	Bang Krathum	บางกระทุ่ม	Phitsanulok	พิษณุโลก	Central
Khok Salut	โคกสลุด	Tha Wung	ท่าวุ้ง	Lopburi	ลพบุรี	Central
Khok Samae San	โคกแสมสาร	Khok Charoen	โคกเจริญ	Lopburi	ลพบุรี	Central
Khok Samran	โคกสำราญ	Ban Haet	บ้านแฮด	Khon Kaen	ขอนแก่น	North-East
Khok Samrong	โคกสำโรง	Khok Samrong	โคกสำโรง	Lopburi	ลพบุรี	Central
Khok San	โคกสาร	Chanuman	ชานุมาน	Amnat Charoen	อำนาจเจริญ	North-East
Khok Sanuan	โคกสนวน	Chamni	ชำนิ	Buriram	บุรีรัมย์	North-East
Khok Sato	โคกสะตอ	Rueso (Malay: Rusa)	รือเสาะ	Narathiwat	นราธิวาส	South
Khok Sawang	โคกสว่าง	Pla Pak	ปลาปาก	Nakhon Phanom	นครพนม	North-East
Khok Sawang	โคกสว่าง	Nong Phok	หนองพอก	Roi Et	ร้อยเอ็ด	North-East
Khok Sawang	โคกสว่าง	Nong Ki	หนองกี่	Buriram	บุรีรัมย์	North-East
Khok Sawang	โคกสว่าง	Samrong	สำโรง	Ubon Ratchathani	อุบลราชธานี	North-East
Khok Sawang	โคกสว่าง	Mueang Saraburi	เมืองสระบุรี	Saraburi	สระบุรี	Central
Khok Sawang	โคกสว่าง	Phanom Phrai	พนมไพร	Roi Et	ร้อยเอ็ด	North-East
Khok Si	โคกสี	Wang Yang	วังยาง	Nakhon Phanom	นครพนม	North-East
Khok Si	โคกสี	Mueang Khon Kaen	เมืองขอนแก่น	Khon Kaen	ขอนแก่น	North-East
Khok Si	โคกสี	Sawang Daen Din	สว่างแดนดิน	Sakon Nakhon	สกลนคร	North-East
Khok Si Thonglang	โคกสีทองหลาง	Wapi Pathum	วาปีปทุม	Maha Sarakham	มหาสารคาม	North-East
Khok Sila	โคกศิลา	Charoen Sin	เจริญศิลป์	Sakon Nakhon	สกลนคร	North-East
Khok Sila	โคกศิลา	Phon Na Kaeo	โพนนาแก้ว	Sakon Nakhon	สกลนคร	North-East
Khok Sombun	โคกสมบูรณ์	Kamalasai	กมลาไสย	Kalasin	กาฬสินธุ์	North-East
Khok Sung	โคกสูง	Khok Sung	โคกสูง	Sa Kaeo	สระแก้ว	East
Khok Sung	โคกสูง	Ubolratana	อุบลรัตน์	Khon Kaen	ขอนแก่น	North-East
Khok Sung	โคกสูง	Phon Thong	โพนทอง	Roi Et	ร้อยเอ็ด	North-East
Khok Sung	โคกสูง	Mueang Chaiyaphum	เมืองชัยภูมิ	Chaiyaphum	ชัยภูมิ	North-East
Khok Sung	โคกสูง	Pla Pak	ปลาปาก	Nakhon Phanom	นครพนม	North-East
Khok Sung	โคกสูง	Nong Ki	หนองกี่	Buriram	บุรีรัมย์	North-East
Khok Tabong	โคกตะบอง	Tha Maka	ท่ามะกา	Kanchanaburi	กาญจนบุรี	West
Khok Takhian	โคกตะเคียน	Kap Choeng	กาบเชิง	Surin	สุรินทร์	North-East
Khok Tan	โคกตาล	Benchalak	เบญจลักษ์	Sisaket	ศรีสะเกษ	North-East
Khok Tan	โคกตาล	Phu Sing	ภูสิงห์	Sisaket	ศรีสะเกษ	North-East
Khok Thai	โคกไทย	Si Mahosot	ศรีมโหสถ	Prachin Buri	ปราจีนบุรี	East
Khok Thai	โคกไทย	Pak Thong Chai	ปักธงชัย	Nakhon Ratchasima	นครราชสีมา	North-East
Khok Tum	โคกตูม	Prakhon Chai	ประโคนชัย	Buriram	บุรีรัมย์	North-East
Khok Tum	โคกตูม	Nong Khae	หนองแค	Saraburi	สระบุรี	Central
Khok Tum	โคกตูม	Mueang Lopburi	เมืองลพบุรี	Lopburi	ลพบุรี	Central
Khok Wan	โคกว่าน	Lahan Sai	ละหานทราย	Buriram	บุรีรัมย์	North-East
Khok Yae	โคกแย้	Nong Khae	หนองแค	Saraburi	สระบุรี	Central
Khok Yai	โคกใหญ่	Tha Li	ท่าลี่	Loei	เลย	North-East
Khok Yai	โคกใหญ่	Ban Mo	บ้านหมอ	Saraburi	สระบุรี	Central
Khok Yai	โคกใหญ่	Non Sang	โนนสัง	Nong Bua Lamphu	หนองบัวลำภู	North-East
Khok Yang	โคกยาง	Nuea Khlong	เหนือคลอง	Krabi	กระบี่	South
Khok Yang	โคกยาง	Kantang	กันตัง	Trang	ตรัง	South
Khok Yang	โคกยาง	Prasat	ปราสาท	Surin	สุรินทร์	North-East
Khok Yang	โคกย่าง	Prakhon Chai	ประโคนชัย	Buriram	บุรีรัมย์	North-East
Kholo Tanyong	คอลอตันหยง	Nong Chik	หนองจิก	Pattani	ปัตตานี	South
Kholo	ฆอเลาะ	Waeng	แว้ง	Narathiwat	นราธิวาส	South
Khom Bang	คมบาง	Mueang Chanthaburi	เมืองจันทบุรี	Chanthaburi	จันทบุรี	East
Khon Buri	ครบุรี	Khon Buri	ครบุรี	Nakhon Ratchasima	นครราชสีมา	North-East
Khon Buri Tai	ครบุรีใต้	Khon Buri	ครบุรี	Nakhon Ratchasima	นครราชสีมา	North-East
Khon Chim	คอนฉิม	Waeng Yai	แวงใหญ่	Khon Kaen	ขอนแก่น	North-East
Khon Hat	ขอนหาด	Cha-uat	ชะอวด	Nakhon Si Thammarat	นครศรีธรรมราช	South
Khon Kaen	ขอนแก่น	Mueang Roi Et	เมืองร้อยเอ็ด	Roi Et	ร้อยเอ็ด	North-East
Khon Kam	คอนกาม	Yang Chum Noi	ยางชุมน้อย	Sisaket	ศรีสะเกษ	North-East
Khon Klan	ขอนคลาน	Thung Wa	ทุ่งหว้า	Satun	สตูล	South
Khon Sai	คอนสาย	Ku Kaeo	กู่แก้ว	Udon Thani	อุดรธานี	North-East
Khon Sai	คอนสาย	Trakan Phuet Phon	ตระการพืชผล	Ubon Ratchathani	อุบลราชธานี	North-East
Khon San	คอนสาร	Khon San	คอนสาร	Chaiyaphum	ชัยภูมิ	North-East
Khon Sawan	คอนสวรรค์	Wanon Niwat	วานรนิวาส	Sakon Nakhon	สกลนคร	North-East
Khon Sawan	คอนสวรรค์	Khon Sawan	คอนสวรรค์	Chaiyaphum	ชัยภูมิ	North-East
Khon Taek	ขอนแตก	Sangkha	สังขะ	Surin	สุรินทร์	North-East
Khon Yung	ขอนยูง	Kut Chap	กุดจับ	Udon Thani	อุดรธานี	North-East
Khong Chai Phatthana	ฆ้องชัยพัฒนา	Khong Chai	ฆ้องชัย	Kalasin	กาฬสินธุ์	North-East
Khong Chiam	โขงเจียม	Khong Chiam	โขงเจียม	Ubon Ratchathani	อุบลราชธานี	North-East
Khong Phai	โค้งไผ่	Khanu Woralaksaburi	ขาณุวรลักษบุรี	Kamphaeng Phet	กำแพงเพชร	Central
Khong Yang	โค้งยาง	Sung Noen	สูงเนิน	Nakhon Ratchasima	นครราชสีมา	North-East
Khonthi	คณฑี	Mueang Kamphaeng Phet	เมืองกำแพงเพชร	Kamphaeng Phet	กำแพงเพชร	Central
Khorat	โคราช	Sung Noen	สูงเนิน	Nakhon Ratchasima	นครราชสีมา	North-East
Khosit	โฆษิต	Tak Bai (Malay: Tabal)	ตากใบ	Narathiwat	นราธิวาส	South
Khotchasit	คชสิทธิ์	Nong Khae	หนองแค	Saraburi	สระบุรี	Central
Khreng	เคร็ง	Cha-uat	ชะอวด	Nakhon Si Thammarat	นครศรีธรรมราช	South
Khron	ครน	Sawi	สวี	Chumphon	ชุมพร	South
Khrueng	ครึ่ง	Chiang Khong	เชียงของ	Chiang Rai	เชียงราย	North
Khu	คู	Chana (Malay: Chenok)	จะนะ	Songkhla	สงขลา	South
Khu Bang Luang	คูบางหลวง	Lat Lum Kaeo	ลาดหลุมแก้ว	Pathum Thani	ปทุมธานี	Central
Khu Bua	คูบัว	Mueang Ratchaburi	เมืองราชบุรี	Ratchaburi	ราชบุรี	West
Khu Fang Nuea	คู้ฝั่งเหนือ	Khet Nong Chok	หนองจอก	Bangkok	กรุงเทพมหานคร	Central
Khu Kham	คูคำ	Sam Sung	ซำสูง	Khon Kaen	ขอนแก่น	North-East
Khu Khat	คูขาด	Khong	คง	Nakhon Ratchasima	นครราชสีมา	North-East
Khu Khot	คูคต	Lam Luk Ka	ลำลูกกา	Pathum Thani	ปทุมธานี	Central
Khu Khut	คูขุด	Sathing Phra	สทิงพระ	Songkhla	สงขลา	South
Khu Khwang	คูขวาง	Lat Lum Kaeo	ลาดหลุมแก้ว	Pathum Thani	ปทุมธานี	Central
Khu Lam Phan	คู้ลำพัน	Si Mahosot	ศรีมโหสถ	Prachin Buri	ปราจีนบุรี	East
Khu Mueang	คูเมือง	Mueang Suang	เมืองสรวง	Roi Et	ร้อยเอ็ด	North-East
Khu Mueang	คูเมือง	Warin Chamrap	วารินชำราบ	Ubon Ratchathani	อุบลราชธานี	North-East
Khu Mueang	คูเมือง	Nong Bua Daeng	หนองบัวแดง	Chaiyaphum	ชัยภูมิ	North-East
Khu Mueang	คูเมือง	Khu Mueang	คูเมือง	Buriram	บุรีรัมย์	North-East
Khu Sakham	คูสะคาม	Wanon Niwat	วานรนิวาส	Sakon Nakhon	สกลนคร	North-East
Khu Salot	คู้สลอด	Lat Bua Luang	ลาดบัวหลวง	Phra Nakhon Si Ayutthaya	พระนครศรีอยุธยา	Central
Khu Sot	คูซอด	Mueang Sisaket	เมืองศรีสะเกษ	Sisaket	ศรีสะเกษ	North-East
Khu Tan	คูตัน	Kap Choeng	กาบเชิง	Surin	สุรินทร์	North-East
Khu Tao	คูเต่า	Hat Yai	หาดใหญ่	Songkhla	สงขลา	South
Khu Yai Mi	คู้ยายหมี	Sanam Chai Khet	สนามชัยเขต	Chachoengsao	ฉะเชิงเทรา	East
Khua Kai	ขัวก่าย	Wanon Niwat	วานรนิวาส	Sakon Nakhon	สกลนคร	North-East
Khua Mung	ขัวมุง	Saraphi	สารภี	Chiang Mai	เชียงใหม่	North
Khua Riang	ขัวเรียง	Chum Phae	ชุมแพ	Khon Kaen	ขอนแก่น	North-East
Khuan	ควน	Panare (Malay: Penarik)	ปะนาเระ	Pattani	ปัตตานี	South
Khuan	ควร	Pong	ปง	Phayao	พะเยา	North
Khuan Chalik	ควนชะลิก	Hua Sai	หัวไทร	Nakhon Si Thammarat	นครศรีธรรมราช	South
Khuan Chum	ควนชุม	Ron Phibun	ร่อนพิบูลย์	Nakhon Si Thammarat	นครศรีธรรมราช	South
Khuan Don	ควนโดน	Khuan Don (Malay: Dusun)	ควนโดน	Satun	สตูล	South
Khuan Kalong	ควนกาหลง	Khuan Kalong	ควนกาหลง	Satun	สตูล	South
Khuan Khan	ควนขัน	Mueang Satun (Malay: Mambang)	เมืองสตูล	Satun	สตูล	South
Khuan Khanun	ควนขนุน	Khuan Khanun	ควนขนุน	Phatthalung	พัทลุง	South
Khuan Khanun	ควนขนุน	Khao Chaison	เขาชัยสน	Phatthalung	พัทลุง	South
Khuan Klang	ควนกลาง	Phipun	พิปูน	Nakhon Si Thammarat	นครศรีธรรมราช	South
Khuan Koei	ควนเกย	Ron Phibun	ร่อนพิบูลย์	Nakhon Si Thammarat	นครศรีธรรมราช	South
Khuan Krot	ควนกรด	Thung Song	ทุ่งสง	Nakhon Si Thammarat	นครศรีธรรมราช	South
Khuan Lang	ควนลัง	Hat Yai	หาดใหญ่	Songkhla	สงขลา	South
Khuan Mao	ควนเมา	Ratsada	รัษฎา	Trang	ตรัง	South
Khuan Maphrao	ควนมะพร้าว	Mueang Phatthalung	เมืองพัทลุง	Phatthalung	พัทลุง	South
Khuan Nong Hong	ควนหนองหงษ์	Cha-uat	ชะอวด	Nakhon Si Thammarat	นครศรีธรรมราช	South
Khuan Nong Khwa	ควนหนองคว้า	Chulabhorn	จุฬาภรณ์	Nakhon Si Thammarat	นครศรีธรรมราช	South
Khuan Nori	ควนโนรี	Khok Pho	โคกโพธิ์	Pattani	ปัตตานี	South
Khuan Phang	ควนพัง	Ron Phibun	ร่อนพิบูลย์	Nakhon Si Thammarat	นครศรีธรรมราช	South
Khuan Pho	ควนโพธิ์	Mueang Satun (Malay: Mambang)	เมืองสตูล	Satun	สตูล	South
Khuan Pring	ควนปริง	Mueang Trang	เมืองตรัง	Trang	ตรัง	South
Khuan Ru	ควนรู	Rattaphum	รัตภูมิ	Songkhla	สงขลา	South
Khuan Sato	ควนสตอ	Khuan Don (Malay: Dusun)	ควนโดน	Satun	สตูล	South
Khuan Si	ควนศรี	Ban Nà Sản	บ้านนาสาร	Surat Thani	สุราษฎร์ธานี	South
Khuan So	ควนโส	Khuan Niang	ควนเนียง	Songkhla	สงขลา	South
Khuan Suban	ควนสุบรรณ	Ban Nà Sản	บ้านนาสาร	Surat Thani	สุราษฎร์ธานี	South
Khuan Thani	ควนธานี	Kantang	กันตัง	Trang	ตรัง	South
Khuan Thong	ควนทอง	Khanom	ขนอม	Nakhon Si Thammarat	นครศรีธรรมราช	South
Khuang Pao	ข่วงเปา	Chom Thong	จอมทอง	Chiang Mai	เชียงใหม่	North
Khue Wiang	คือเวียง	Dok Khamtai	ดอกคำใต้	Phayao	พะเยา	North
Khuea Nam	เขือน้ำ	Ban Phue	บ้านผือ	Udon Thani	อุดรธานี	North-East
Khuean	เขื่อน	Kosum Phisai	โกสุมพิสัย	Maha Sarakham	มหาสารคาม	North-East
Khuean Bang Lang	เขื่อนบางลาง	Bannang Sata (Malay: Benang Setar)	บันนังสตา	Yala	ยะลา	South
Khuean Phak	เขื่อนผาก	Phrao	พร้าว	Chiang Mai	เชียงใหม่	North
Khuean Ubolratana	เขื่อนอุบลรัตน์	Ubolratana	อุบลรัตน์	Khon Kaen	ขอนแก่น	North-East
Khueang Nai	เขื่องใน	Khueang Nai	เขื่องใน	Ubon Ratchathani	อุบลราชธานี	North-East
Khuekkhak	คึกคัก	Takua Pa	ตะกั่วป่า	Phang Nga	พังงา	South
Khuem Yai	คึมใหญ่	Mueang Amnat Charoen	เมืองอำนาจเจริญ	Amnat Charoen	อำนาจเจริญ	North-East
Khuemchat	คึมชาด	Nong Song Hong	หนองสองห้อง	Khon Kaen	ขอนแก่น	North-East
Khueng	ขึ่ง	Wiang Sa	เวียงสา	Nan	น่าน	North
Khuha	คูหา	Saba Yoi (Malay: Sebayu)	สะบ้าย้อย	Songkhla	สงขลา	South
Khuha Sawan	คูหาสวรรค์	Khet Phasi Charoen	ภาษีเจริญ	Bangkok	กรุงเทพมหานคร	Central
Khuha Sawan	คูหาสวรรค์	Mueang Phatthalung	เมืองพัทลุง	Phatthalung	พัทลุง	South
Khuha Tai	คูหาใต้	Rattaphum	รัตภูมิ	Songkhla	สงขลา	South
Khui	ขุย	Lam Thamenchai	ลำทะเมนชัย	Nakhon Ratchasima	นครราชสีมา	North-East
Khui Ban Ong	คุยบ้านโอง	Phran Kratai	พรานกระต่าย	Kamphaeng Phet	กำแพงเพชร	Central
Khui Muang	คุยม่วง	Bang Rakam	บางระกำ	Phitsanulok	พิษณุโลก	Central
Khulu	ขุหลุ	Trakan Phuet Phon	ตระการพืชผล	Ubon Ratchathani	อุบลราชธานี	North-East
Khum Kao	คุ้มเก่า	Khao Wong	เขาวง	Kalasin	กาฬสินธุ์	North-East
Khum Thong	ขุมทอง	Khet Lat Krabang	ลาดกระบัง	Bangkok	กรุงเทพมหานคร	Central
Khun Fang	ขุนฝาง	Mueang Uttaradit	เมืองอุตรดิตถ์	Uttaradit	อุตรดิตถ์	North
Khun Han	ขุนหาญ	Khun Han	ขุนหาญ	Sisaket	ศรีสะเกษ	North-East
Khun Kaeo	ขุนแก้ว	Nakhon Chai Si	นครชัยศรี	Nakhon Pathom	นครปฐม	Central
Khun Khlon	ขุนโขลน	Phra Phutthabat	พระพุทธบาท	Saraburi	สระบุรี	Central
Khun Khong	ขุนคง	Hang Dong	หางดง	Chiang Mai	เชียงใหม่	North
Khun Khuan	ขุนควร	Pong	ปง	Phayao	พะเยา	North
Khun Krathing	ขุนกระทิง	Mueang Chumphon	เมืองชุมพร	Chumphon	ชุมพร	South
Khun Mae La Noi	ขุนแม่ลาน้อย	Mae La Noi	แม่ลาน้อย	Mae Hong Son	แม่ฮ่องสอน	North
Khun Phithak	ขุนพิทักษ์	Damnoen Saduak	ดำเนินสะดวก	Ratchaburi	ราชบุรี	West
Khun Si	ขุนศรี	Sai Noi	ไทรน้อย	Nonthaburi	นนทบุรี	Central
Khun Song	ขุนซ่อง	Kaeng Hang Maeo	แก่งหางแมว	Chanthaburi	จันทบุรี	East
Khun Tat Wai	ขุนตัดหวาย	Chana (Malay: Chenok)	จะนะ	Songkhla	สงขลา	South
Khun Thale	ขุนทะเล	Mueang Surat Thani	เมืองสุราษฎร์ธานี	Surat Thani	สุราษฎร์ธานี	South
Khun Thale	ขุนทะเล	Lan Saka	ลานสกา	Nakhon Si Thammarat	นครศรีธรรมราช	South
Khun Thong	ขุนทอง	Bua Yai	บัวใหญ่	Nakhon Ratchasima	นครราชสีมา	North-East
Khun Yuam	ขุนยวม	Khun Yuam	ขุนยวม	Mae Hong Son	แม่ฮ่องสอน	North
Khung Krathin	คุ้งกระถิน	Mueang Ratchaburi	เมืองราชบุรี	Ratchaburi	ราชบุรี	West
Khung Lan	คุ้งลาน	Bang Pa-in	บางปะอิน	Phra Nakhon Si Ayutthaya	พระนครศรีอยุธยา	Central
Khung Nam Won	คุ้งน้ำวน	Mueang Ratchaburi	เมืองราชบุรี	Ratchaburi	ราชบุรี	West
Khung Phayom	คุ้งพยอม	Ban Pong	บ้านโป่ง	Ratchaburi	ราชบุรี	West
Khung Samphao	คุ้งสำเภา	Manorom	มโนรมย์	Chai Nat	ชัยนาท	Central
Khung Taphao	คุ้งตะเภา	Mueang Uttaradit	เมืองอุตรดิตถ์	Uttaradit	อุตรดิตถ์	North
Khup	คูบ	Nam Kliang	น้ำเกลี้ยง	Sisaket	ศรีสะเกษ	North-East
Khura	คุระ	Khura Buri	คุระบุรี	Phang Nga	พังงา	South
Khuring	คุริง	Tha Sae	ท่าแซะ	Chumphon	ชุมพร	South
Khwae Om	แควอ้อม	Amphawa	อัมพวา	Samut Songkhram	สมุทรสงคราม	Central
Khwae Yai	แควใหญ่	Mueang Nakhon Sawan	เมืองนครสวรรค์	Nakhon Sawan	นครสวรรค์	Central
Khwan Mueang	ขวัญเมือง	Selaphum	เสลภูมิ	Roi Et	ร้อยเอ็ด	North-East
Khwao	ขวาว	Selaphum	เสลภูมิ	Roi Et	ร้อยเอ็ด	North-East
Khwao	เขวา	Mueang Maha Sarakham	เมืองมหาสารคาม	Maha Sarakham	มหาสารคาม	North-East
Khwao Rai	เขวาไร่	Na Chueak	นาเชือก	Maha Sarakham	มหาสารคาม	North-East
Khwao Rai	เขวาไร่	Kosum Phisai	โกสุมพิสัย	Maha Sarakham	มหาสารคาม	North-East
Khwao Sinarin	เขวาสินรินทร์	Khwao Sinarin	เขวาสินรินทร์	Surin	สุรินทร์	North-East
Khwao Thung	เขวาทุ่ง	Thawat Buri	ธวัชบุรี	Roi Et	ร้อยเอ็ด	North-East
Khwao Yai	ขวาวใหญ่	Sikhoraphum	ศีขรภูมิ	Surin	สุรินทร์	North-East
Khwao Yai	เขวาใหญ่	Kantharawichai	กันทรวิชัย	Maha Sarakham	มหาสารคาม	North-East
Kia	เกียร์	Sukhirin	สุคิริน	Narathiwat	นราธิวาส	South
Klaeng	แกลง	Mueang Rayong	เมืองระยอง	Rayong	ระยอง	East
Klai	กลาย	Tha Sala	ท่าศาลา	Nakhon Si Thammarat	นครศรีธรรมราช	South
Klang	กลาง	Selaphum	เสลภูมิ	Roi Et	ร้อยเอ็ด	North-East
Klang	กลาง	Det Udom	เดชอุดม	Ubon Ratchathani	อุบลราชธานี	North-East
Klang Daet	กลางแดด	Mueang Nakhon Sawan	เมืองนครสวรรค์	Nakhon Sawan	นครสวรรค์	Central
Klang Dong	กลางดง	Pak Chong	ปากช่อง	Nakhon Ratchasima	นครราชสีมา	North-East
Klang Dong	กลางดง	Thung Saliam	ทุ่งเสลี่ยม	Sukhothai	สุโขทัย	Central
Klang Muen	กลางหมื่น	Mueang Kalasin	เมืองกาฬสินธุ์	Kalasin	กาฬสินธุ์	North-East
Klang Wiang	กลางเวียง	Wiang Sa	เวียงสา	Nan	น่าน	North
Klang Yai	กลางใหญ่	Khueang Nai	เขื่องใน	Ubon Ratchathani	อุบลราชธานี	North-East
Klang Yai	กลางใหญ่	Ban Phue	บ้านผือ	Udon Thani	อุดรธานี	North-East
Klat Luang	กลัดหลวง	Tha Yang	ท่ายาง	Phetchaburi	เพชรบุรี	West
Klondo	กลอนโด	Dan Makham Tia	ด่านมะขามเตี้ย	Kanchanaburi	กาญจนบุรี	West
Kluai Kwang	กล้วยกว้าง	Huai Thap Than	ห้วยทับทัน	Sisaket	ศรีสะเกษ	North-East
Kluai Phae	กล้วยแพะ	Mueang Lampang	เมืองลำปาง	Lampang	ลำปาง	North
Ko	ก้อ	Li	ลี้	Lamphun	ลำพูน	North
Ko Chan	เกาะจัน	Mayo	มายอ	Pattani	ปัตตานี	South
Ko Chan	เกาะจันทร์	Ko Chan	เกาะจันทร์	Chonburi	ชลบุรี	East
Ko Chang	เกาะช้าง	Ko Chang	เกาะช้าง	Trat	ตราด	East
Ko Chang	เกาะช้าง	Mae Sai	แม่สาย	Chiang Rai	เชียงราย	North
Ko Chang Tai	เกาะช้างใต้	Ko Chang	เกาะช้าง	Trat	ตราด	East
Ko E	ก่อเอ้	Khueang Nai	เขื่องใน	Ubon Ratchathani	อุบลราชธานี	North-East
Ko Kaeo	เกาะแก้ว	Selaphum	เสลภูมิ	Roi Et	ร้อยเอ็ด	North-East
Ko Kaeo	เกาะแก้ว	Khok Samrong	โคกสำโรง	Lopburi	ลพบุรี	Central
Ko Kaeo	เกาะแก้ว	Mueang Phuket	เมืองภูเก็ต	Phuket	ภูเก็ต	South
Ko Kaeo	เกาะแก้ว	Samrong Thap	สำโรงทาบ	Surin	สุรินทร์	North-East
Ko Kha	เกาะคา	Ko Kha	เกาะคา	Lampang	ลำปาง	North
Ko Khan	เกาะขันธ์	Cha-uat	ชะอวด	Nakhon Si Thammarat	นครศรีธรรมราช	South
Ko Khanun	เกาะขนุน	Phanom Sarakham	พนมสารคาม	Chachoengsao	ฉะเชิงเทรา	East
Ko Kho Khao	เกาะคอเขา	Takua Pa	ตะกั่วป่า	Phang Nga	พังงา	South
Ko Khwang	เกาะขวาง	Mueang Chanthaburi	เมืองจันทบุรี	Chanthaburi	จันทบุรี	East
Ko Klang	เกาะกลาง	Ko Lanta	เกาะลันตา	Krabi	กระบี่	South
Ko Koet	เกาะเกิด	Bang Pa-in	บางปะอิน	Phra Nakhon Si Ayutthaya	พระนครศรีอยุธยา	Central
Ko Kret	เกาะเกร็ด	Pak Kret	ปากเกร็ด	Nonthaburi	นนทบุรี	Central
Ko Kut	เกาะกูด	Ko Kut	เกาะกูด	Trat	ตราด	East
Ko Lak	เกาะหลัก	Mueang Prachuap Khiri Khan	เมืองประจวบคีรีขันธ์	Prachuap Khiri Khan	ประจวบคีรีขันธ์	West
Ko Lanta Noi	เกาะลันตาน้อย	Ko Lanta	เกาะลันตา	Krabi	กระบี่	South
Ko Lanta Yai	เกาะลันตาใหญ่	Ko Lanta	เกาะลันตา	Krabi	กระบี่	South
Ko Libong	เกาะลิบง	Kantang	กันตัง	Trang	ตรัง	South
Ko Loi	เกาะลอย	Phan Thong	พานทอง	Chonburi	ชลบุรี	East
Ko Loi	เกาะลอย	Prachantakham	ประจันตคาม	Prachin Buri	ปราจีนบุรี	East
Ko Mak	เกาะหมาก	Ko Kut	เกาะกูด	Trat	ตราด	East
Ko Mak	เกาะหมาก	Pak Phayun	ปากพะยูน	Phatthalung	พัทลุง	South
Ko Manao	เกาะมะนาว	Bamnet Narong	บำเหน็จณรงค์	Chaiyaphum	ชัยภูมิ	North-East
Ko Nang Kham	เกาะนางคำ	Pak Phayun	ปากพะยูน	Phatthalung	พัทลุง	South
Ko Panyi	เกาะปันหยี	Mueang Phang Nga	เมืองพังงา	Phang Nga	พังงา	South
Ko Proet	เกาะเปริด	Laem Sing	แหลมสิงห์	Chanthaburi	จันทบุรี	East
Ko Pha-ngan	เกาะพะงัน	Ko Pha-ngan	เกาะพะงัน	Surat Thani	สุราษฎร์ธานี	South
Ko Phayam	เกาะพยาม	Mueang Ranong	เมืองระนอง	Ranong	ระนอง	South
Ko Phet	เกาะเพชร	Hua Sai	หัวไทร	Nakhon Si Thammarat	นครศรีธรรมราช	South
Ko Phlapphla	เกาะพลับพลา	Mueang Ratchaburi	เมืองราชบุรี	Ratchaburi	ราชบุรี	West
Ko Pho	เกาะโพธิ์	Pak Phli	ปากพลี	Nakhon Nayok	นครนายก	Central
Ko Phra Thong	เกาะพระทอง	Khura Buri	คุระบุรี	Phang Nga	พังงา	South
Ko Pia	เกาะเปียะ	Yan Ta Khao	ย่านตาขาว	Trang	ตรัง	South
Ko Po	เกาะเปาะ	Nong Chik	หนองจิก	Pattani	ปัตตานี	South
Ko Rai	เกาะไร่	Ban Pho	บ้านโพธิ์	Chachoengsao	ฉะเชิงเทรา	East
Ko Rang	เกาะรัง	Chai Badan	ชัยบาดาล	Lopburi	ลพบุรี	Central
Ko Rang	เกาะรัง	Ko Chang	เกาะช้าง	Trat	ตราด	East
Ko Rian	เกาะเรียน	Phra Nakhon Si Ayutthaya	พระนครศรีอยุธยา	Phra Nakhon Si Ayutthaya	พระนครศรีอยุธยา	Central
Ko Saba	เกาะสะบ้า	Thepha (Malay: Tiba)	เทพา	Songkhla	สงขลา	South
Ko Samrong	เกาะสำโรง	Mueang Kanchanaburi	เมืองกาญจนบุรี	Kanchanaburi	กาญจนบุรี	West
Ko San Phra	เกาะศาลพระ	Wat Phleng	วัดเพลง	Ratchaburi	ราชบุรี	West
Ko Sarai	เกาะสาหร่าย	Mueang Satun (Malay: Mambang)	เมืองสตูล	Satun	สตูล	South
Ko Sathon	เกาะสะท้อน	Tak Bai (Malay: Tabal)	ตากใบ	Narathiwat	นราธิวาส	South
Ko Siboya	เกาะศรีบอยา	Nuea Khlong	เหนือคลอง	Krabi	กระบี่	South
Ko Sukon	เกาะสุกร	Palian	ปะเหลียน	Trang	ตรัง	South
Ko Ta Liang	เกาะตาเลี้ยง	Si Samrong	ศรีสำโรง	Sukhothai	สุโขทัย	Central
Ko Taeo	เกาะแต้ว	Mueang Songkhla (Malay: Singgora)	เมืองสงขลา	Songkhla	สงขลา	South
Ko Tan	เกาะตาล	Khanu Woralaksaburi	ขาณุวรลักษบุรี	Kamphaeng Phet	กำแพงเพชร	Central
Ko Tao	เกาะเต่า	Ko Pha-ngan	เกาะพะงัน	Surat Thani	สุราษฎร์ธานี	South
Ko Tao	เกาะเต่า	Pa Phayom	ป่าพะยอม	Phatthalung	พัทลุง	South
Ko Taphao	เกาะตะเภา	Ban Tak	บ้านตาก	Tak	ตาก	West
Ko Thepho	เกาะเทโพ	Mueang Uthai Thani	เมืองอุทัยธานี	Uthai Thani	อุทัยธานี	Central
Ko Thuat	เกาะทวด	Pak Phanang	ปากพนัง	Nakhon Si Thammarat	นครศรีธรรมราช	South
Ko Wai	เกาะหวาย	Pak Phli	ปากพลี	Nakhon Nayok	นครนายก	Central
Ko Yai	เกาะใหญ่	Krasae Sin	กระแสสินธุ์	Songkhla	สงขลา	South
Ko Yao Noi	เกาะยาวน้อย	Ko Yao	เกาะยาว	Phang Nga	พังงา	South
Ko Yao Yai	เกาะยาวใหญ่	Ko Yao	เกาะยาว	Phang Nga	พังงา	South
Ko Yo	เกาะยอ	Mueang Songkhla (Malay: Singgora)	เมืองสงขลา	Songkhla	สงขลา	South
Koei Chai	เกยไชย	Chum Saeng	ชุมแสง	Nakhon Sawan	นครสวรรค์	Central
Koeng	เกิ้ง	Mueang Maha Sarakham	เมืองมหาสารคาม	Maha Sarakham	มหาสารคาม	North-East
Kok Daeng	กกแดง	Nikhom Kham Soi	นิคมคำสร้อย	Mukdahan	มุกดาหาร	North-East
Kok Du	กกดู่	Mueang Loei	เมืองเลย	Loei	เลย	North-East
Kok Kaeo Burapha	กกแก้วบูรพา	Bang Sai	บางไทร	Phra Nakhon Si Ayutthaya	พระนครศรีอยุธยา	Central
Kok Ko	กกโก	Mueang Lopburi	เมืองลพบุรี	Lopburi	ลพบุรี	Central
Kok Kung	กกกุง	Mueang Suang	เมืองสรวง	Roi Et	ร้อยเอ็ด	North-East
Kok Pho	กกโพธิ์	Nong Phok	หนองพอก	Roi Et	ร้อยเอ็ด	North-East
Kok Pla Sio	กกปลาซิว	Phu Phan	ภูพาน	Sakon Nakhon	สกลนคร	North-East
Kok Raet	กกแรต	Kong Krailat	กงไกรลาศ	Sukhothai	สุโขทัย	Central
Kok Sathon	กกสะทอน	Dan Sai	ด่านซ้าย	Loei	เลย	North-East
Kok Thong	กกทอง	Mueang Loei	เมืองเลย	Loei	เลย	North-East
Kok Tum	กกตูม	Dong Luang	ดงหลวง	Mukdahan	มุกดาหาร	North-East
Kolam	กอลำ	Yarang	ยะรัง	Pattani	ปัตตานี	South
Kon Kaeo	ก้อนแก้ว	Khlong Khuean	คลองเขื่อน	Chachoengsao	ฉะเชิงเทรา	East
Kong	กง	Kong Krailat	กงไกรลาศ	Sukhothai	สุโขทัย	Central
Kong Din	กองดิน	Klaeng	แกลง	Rayong	ระยอง	East
Kong Khaek	กองแขก	Mae Chaem	แม่แจ่ม	Chiang Mai	เชียงใหม่	North
Kong Koi	กองก๋อย	Sop Moei	สบเมย	Mae Hong Son	แม่ฮ่องสอน	North
Kong Nang	กองนาง	Tha Bo	ท่าบ่อ	Nong Khai	หนองคาย	North-East
Kong Phon	กองโพน	Na Tan	นาตาล	Ubon Ratchathani	อุบลราชธานี	North-East
Kong Ra	กงหรา	Kong Ra	กงหรา	Phatthalung	พัทลุง	South
Kong Rot	กงรถ	Huai Thalaeng	ห้วยแถลง	Nakhon Ratchasima	นครราชสีมา	North-East
Kong Thanu	โก่งธนู	Mueang Lopburi	เมืองลพบุรี	Lopburi	ลพบุรี	Central
Kong Thun	กองทูล	Nong Phai	หนองไผ่	Phetchabun	เพชรบูรณ์	Central
Kop Chao	กบเจา	Bang Ban	บางบาล	Phra Nakhon Si Ayutthaya	พระนครศรีอยุธยา	Central
Kosamphi	โกสัมพี	Kosamphi Nakhon	โกสัมพีนคร	Kamphaeng Phet	กำแพงเพชร	Central
Kota Baru	โกตาบารู	Raman (Malay: Reman)	รามัน	Yala	ยะลา	South
Koto Tuera	กอตอตือร๊ะ	Raman (Malay: Reman)	รามัน	Yala	ยะลา	South
Kra Chan	กระจัน	U Thong	อู่ทอง	Suphan Buri	สุพรรณบุรี	Central
Kra-om	กระออม	Samrong Thap	สำโรงทาบ	Surin	สุรินทร์	North-East
Krabi Noi	กระบี่น้อย	Mueang Krabi	เมืองกระบี่	Krabi	กระบี่	South
Krabi Yai	กระบี่ใหญ่	Mueang Krabi	เมืองกระบี่	Krabi	กระบี่	South
Krabueang	กระเบื้อง	Chumphon Buri	ชุมพลบุรี	Surin	สุรินทร์	North-East
Krabueang Nok	กระเบื้องนอก	Mueang Yang	เมืองยาง	Nakhon Ratchasima	นครราชสีมา	North-East
Krabueang Yai	กระเบื้องใหญ่	Phimai	พิมาย	Nakhon Ratchasima	นครราชสีมา	North-East
Krachae	กระแจะ	Na Yai Am	นายายอาม	Chanthaburi	จันทบุรี	East
Krachaeng	กระแชง	Bang Sai	บางไทร	Phra Nakhon Si Ayutthaya	พระนครศรีอยุธยา	Central
Krachaeng	กระแชง	Kantharalak	กันทรลักษ์	Sisaket	ศรีสะเกษ	North-East
Krachaeng	กระแชง	Sam Khok	สามโคก	Pathum Thani	ปทุมธานี	Central
Krachio	กระจิว	Phachi	ภาชี	Phra Nakhon Si Ayutthaya	พระนครศรีอยุธยา	Central
Krachon	กระชอน	Phimai	พิมาย	Nakhon Ratchasima	นครราชสีมา	North-East
Kradang-nga	กระดังงา	Sathing Phra	สทิงพระ	Songkhla	สงขลา	South
Kradangnga	กระดังงา	Bang Khonthi	บางคนที	Samut Songkhram	สมุทรสงคราม	Central
Kradian	กระเดียน	Trakan Phuet Phon	ตระการพืชผล	Ubon Ratchathani	อุบลราชธานี	North-East
Krado	กระโด	Yarang	ยะรัง	Pattani	ปัตตานี	South
Krahat	กระหาด	Chom Phra	จอมพระ	Surin	สุรินทร์	North-East
Krai Klang	ไกรกลาง	Kong Krailat	กงไกรลาศ	Sukhothai	สุโขทัย	Central
Krai Nai	ไกรใน	Kong Krailat	กงไกรลาศ	Sukhothai	สุโขทัย	Central
Krai Nok	ไกรนอก	Kong Krailat	กงไกรลาศ	Sukhothai	สุโขทัย	Central
Kram	กร่ำ	Klaeng	แกลง	Rayong	ระยอง	East
Kranuan	กระนวน	Sam Sung	ซำสูง	Khon Kaen	ขอนแก่น	North-East
Krap Yai	กรับใหญ่	Ban Pong	บ้านโป่ง	Ratchaburi	ราชบุรี	West
Krapho	กระโพ	Tha Tum	ท่าตูม	Surin	สุรินทร์	North-East
Krasae Bon	กระแสบน	Klaeng	แกลง	Rayong	ระยอง	East
Krasae Sin	กระแสสินธุ์	Krasae Sin	กระแสสินธุ์	Songkhla	สงขลา	South
Krasang	กระสัง	Satuek	สตึก	Buriram	บุรีรัมย์	North-East
Krasang	กระสัง	Mueang Buriram	เมืองบุรีรัมย์	Buriram	บุรีรัมย์	North-East
Krasang	กระสัง	Krasang	กระสัง	Buriram	บุรีรัมย์	North-East
Krasiao	กระเสียว	Sam Chuk	สามชุก	Suphan Buri	สุพรรณบุรี	Central
Kraso	กระเสาะ	Mayo	มายอ	Pattani	ปัตตานี	South
Krasom	กระโสม	Takua Thung	ตะกั่วทุ่ง	Phang Nga	พังงา	South
Krasop	กระโสบ	Mueang Ubon Ratchathani	เมืองอุบลราชธานี	Ubon Ratchathani	อุบลราชธานี	North-East
Krathiam	กระเทียม	Sangkha	สังขะ	Surin	สุรินทร์	North-East
Krathok	กระโทก	Chok Chai	โชคชัย	Nakhon Ratchasima	นครราชสีมา	North-East
Krathum Lom	กระทุ่มล้ม	Sam Phran	สามพราน	Nakhon Pathom	นครปฐม	Central
Krathum Phaeo	กระทุ่มแพ้ว	Ban Sang	บ้านสร้าง	Prachin Buri	ปราจีนบุรี	East
Krathum Rai	กระทุ่มราย	Khet Nong Chok	หนองจอก	Bangkok	กรุงเทพมหานคร	Central
Krathum Rai	กระทุ่มราย	Prathai	ประทาย	Nakhon Ratchasima	นครราชสีมา	North-East
Kratip	กระตีบ	Kamphaeng Saen	กำแพงแสน	Nakhon Pathom	นครปฐม	Central
Krawa	กระหวะ	Mayo	มายอ	Pattani	ปัตตานี	South
Krawan	กระหวัน	Khun Han	ขุนหาญ	Sisaket	ศรีสะเกษ	North-East
Kriangkrai	เกรียงไกร	Mueang Nakhon Sawan	เมืองนครสวรรค์	Nakhon Sawan	นครสวรรค์	Central
Kritsana	กฤษณา	Khukhan	ขุขันธ์	Sisaket	ศรีสะเกษ	North-East
Kritsana	กฤษณา	Sikhio	สีคิ้ว	Nakhon Ratchasima	นครราชสีมา	North-East
Kritsana	กฤษณา	Bang Pla Ma	บางปลาม้า	Suphan Buri	สุพรรณบุรี	Central
Krok Kaeo	โกรกแก้ว	Non Suwan	โนนสุวรรณ	Buriram	บุรีรัมย์	North-East
Krok Phra	โกรกพระ	Krok Phra	โกรกพระ	Nakhon Sawan	นครสวรรค์	Central
Krok Sombun	กรอกสมบูรณ์	Si Maha Phot	ศรีมหาโพธิ	Prachin Buri	ปราจีนบุรี	East
Krokkrak	โกรกกราก	Mueang Samut Sakhon	เมืองสมุทรสาคร	Samut Sakhon	สมุทรสาคร	Central
Krong Pinang	กรงปินัง	Krong Pinang (Malay: Kampung Pinang)	กรงปินัง	Yala	ยะลา	South
Krung Ching	กรุงชิง	Nopphitam	นบพิตำ	Nakhon Si Thammarat	นครศรีธรรมราช	South
Krung Yan	กรุงหยัน	Thung Yai	ทุ่งใหญ่	Nakhon Si Thammarat	นครศรีธรรมราช	South
Krut	กรูด	Kanchanadit	กาญจนดิษฐ์	Surat Thani	สุราษฎร์ธานี	South
Krut	กรูด	Phunphin	พุนพิน	Surat Thani	สุราษฎร์ธานี	South
Ku	กู่	Prang Ku	ปรางค์กู่	Sisaket	ศรีสะเกษ	North-East
Ku Ka Sing	กู่กาสิงห์	Kaset Wisai	เกษตรวิสัย	Roi Et	ร้อยเอ็ด	North-East
Ku Santarat	กู่สันตรัตน์	Na Dun	นาดูน	Maha Sarakham	มหาสารคาม	North-East
Ku Suan Taeng	กู่สวนแตง	Ban Mai Chaiyaphot	บ้านใหม่ไชยพจน์	Buriram	บุรีรัมย์	North-East
Ku Talat	กุดลาด	Mueang Ubon Ratchathani	เมืองอุบลราชธานี	Ubon Ratchathani	อุบลราชธานี	North-East
Ku Thong	กู่ทอง	Chiang Yuen	เชียงยืน	Maha Sarakham	มหาสารคาม	North-East
Kuan Wan	กวนวัน	Mueang Nong Khai	เมืองหนองคาย	Nong Khai	หนองคาย	North-East
Kudi	กุฎี	Phak Hai	ผักไห่	Phra Nakhon Si Ayutthaya	พระนครศรีอยุธยา	Central
Kuet Chang	กื้ดช้าง	Mae Taeng	แม่แตง	Chiang Mai	เชียงใหม่	North
Kui Buri	กุยบุรี	Kui Buri	กุยบุรี	Prachuap Khiri Khan	ประจวบคีรีขันธ์	West
Kui Nuea	กุยเหนือ	Kui Buri	กุยบุรี	Prachuap Khiri Khan	ประจวบคีรีขันธ์	West
Kum Hak	กุ่มหัก	Nong Khae	หนองแค	Saraburi	สระบุรี	Central
Kumphawapi	กุมภวาปี	Kumphawapi	กุมภวาปี	Udon Thani	อุดรธานี	North-East
Kung	กุง	Sila Lat	ศิลาลาด	Sisaket	ศรีสะเกษ	North-East
Kung Kao	กุงเก่า	Tha Khantho	ท่าคันโท	Kalasin	กาฬสินธุ์	North-East
Kurae	กุแหระ	Thung Yai	ทุ่งใหญ่	Nakhon Si Thammarat	นครศรีธรรมราช	South
Kurukhu	กุรุคุ	Mueang Nakhon Phanom	เมืองนครพนม	Nakhon Phanom	นครพนม	North-East
Kusuman	กุสุมาลย์	Kusuman	กุสุมาลย์	Sakon Nakhon	สกลนคร	North-East
Kut Bak	กุดบาก	Kut Bak	กุดบาก	Sakon Nakhon	สกลนคร	North-East
Kut Bong	กุดบง	Phon Phisai	โพนพิสัย	Nong Khai	หนองคาย	North-East
Kut Bot	กุดโบสถ์	Soeng Sang	เสิงสาง	Nakhon Ratchasima	นครราชสีมา	North-East
Kut Chap	กุดจับ	Kut Chap	กุดจับ	Udon Thani	อุดรธานี	North-East
Kut Chik	กุดจิก	Sung Noen	สูงเนิน	Nakhon Ratchasima	นครราชสีมา	North-East
Kut Chik	กุดจิก	Mueang Nongbua Lamphu	เมืองหนองบัวลำภู	Nong Bua Lamphu	หนองบัวลำภู	North-East
Kut Chik	กุดจิก	Tha Khantho	ท่าคันโท	Kalasin	กาฬสินธุ์	North-East
Kut Chim	กุดฉิม	That Phanom	ธาตุพนม	Nakhon Phanom	นครพนม	North-East
Kut Chok	กุดจอก	Bua Yai	บัวใหญ่	Nakhon Ratchasima	นครราชสีมา	North-East
Kut Chok	กุดจอก	Nong Mamong	หนองมะโมง	Chai Nat	ชัยนาท	Central
Kut Chom Phu	กุดชมภู	Phibun Mangsahan	พิบูลมังสาหาร	Ubon Ratchathani	อุบลราชธานี	North-East
Kut Chum Saeng	กุดชุมแสง	Nong Bua Daeng	หนองบัวแดง	Chaiyaphum	ชัยภูมิ	North-East
Kut Din Chi	กุดดินจี่	Na Klang	นากลาง	Nong Bua Lamphu	หนองบัวลำภู	North-East
Kut Don	กุดโดน	Huai Mek	ห้วยเม็ก	Kalasin	กาฬสินธุ์	North-East
Kut Du	กุดดู่	Non Sang	โนนสัง	Nong Bua Lamphu	หนองบัวลำภู	North-East
Kut Hae	กุดแห่	Na Klang	นากลาง	Nong Bua Lamphu	หนองบัวลำภู	North-East
Kut Hai	กุดไห	Kut Bak	กุดบาก	Sakon Nakhon	สกลนคร	North-East
Kut Kha Khim	กุดขาคีม	Rattanaburi	รัตนบุรี	Surin	สุรินทร์	North-East
Kut Khae	กุดแข้	Mueang Mukdahan	เมืองมุกดาหาร	Mukdahan	มุกดาหาร	North-East
Kut Khao	กุดค้าว	Kuchinarai	กุฉินารายณ์	Kalasin	กาฬสินธุ์	North-East
Kut Khao	กุดเค้า	Mancha Khiri	มัญจาคีรี	Khon Kaen	ขอนแก่น	North-East
Kut Khon Kaen	กุดขอนแก่น	Phu Wiang	ภูเวียง	Khon Kaen	ขอนแก่น	North-East
Kut Kwang	กุดกว้าง	Nong Ruea	หนองเรือ	Khon Kaen	ขอนแก่น	North-East
Kut Lo	กุดเลาะ	Kaset Sombun	เกษตรสมบูรณ์	Chaiyaphum	ชัยภูมิ	North-East
Kut Mak Fai	กุดหมากไฟ	Nong Wua So	หนองวัวซอ	Udon Thani	อุดรธานี	North-East
Kut Mueang Ham	กุดเมืองฮาม	Yang Chum Noi	ยางชุมน้อย	Sisaket	ศรีสะเกษ	North-East
Kut Nam Sai	กุดน้ำใส	Nam Phong	น้ำพอง	Khon Kaen	ขอนแก่น	North-East
Kut Nam Sai	กุดน้ำใส	Phanom Phrai	พนมไพร	Roi Et	ร้อยเอ็ด	North-East
Kut Nam Sai	กุดน้ำใส	Chatturat	จัตุรัส	Chaiyaphum	ชัยภูมิ	North-East
Kut Ngong	กุฎโง้ง	Phanat Nikhom	พนัสนิคม	Chonburi	ชลบุรี	East
Kut Noi	กุดน้อย	Sikhio	สีคิ้ว	Nakhon Ratchasima	นครราชสีมา	North-East
Kut Nok Plao	กุดนกเปล้า	Mueang Saraburi	เมืองสระบุรี	Saraburi	สระบุรี	Central
Kut Phia Khom	กุดเพียขอม	Chonnabot	ชนบท	Khon Kaen	ขอนแก่น	North-East
Kut Phiman	กุดพิมาน	Dan Khun Thot	ด่านขุนทด	Nakhon Ratchasima	นครราชสีมา	North-East
Kut Phueng	กุดผึ้ง	Suwannakhuha	สุวรรณคูหา	Nong Bua Lamphu	หนองบัวลำภู	North-East
Kut Pla Duk	กุดปลาดุก	Mueang Amnat Charoen	เมืองอำนาจเจริญ	Amnat Charoen	อำนาจเจริญ	North-East
Kut Pla Duk	กุดปลาดุก	Chuen Chom	ชื่นชม	Maha Sarakham	มหาสารคาม	North-East
Kut Pla Khao	กุดปลาค้าว	Khao Wong	เขาวง	Kalasin	กาฬสินธุ์	North-East
Kut Pong	กุดป่อง	Mueang Loei	เมืองเลย	Loei	เลย	North-East
Kut Prathai	กุดประทาย	Det Udom	เดชอุดม	Ubon Ratchathani	อุบลราชธานี	North-East
Kut Rang	กุดรัง	Kut Rang	กุดรัง	Maha Sarakham	มหาสารคาม	North-East
Kut Ruea	กุดเรือ	Thung Si Udom	ทุ่งศรีอุดม	Ubon Ratchathani	อุบลราชธานี	North-East
Kut Ruea Kham	กุดเรือคำ	Wanon Niwat	วานรนิวาส	Sakon Nakhon	สกลนคร	North-East
Kut Sa	กุดสระ	Mueang Udon Thani	เมืองอุดรธานี	Udon Thani	อุดรธานี	North-East
Kut Sai Cho	กุดใส้จ่อ	Kantharawichai	กันทรวิชัย	Maha Sarakham	มหาสารคาม	North-East
Kut Salao	กุดเสลา	Kantharalak	กันทรลักษ์	Sisaket	ศรีสะเกษ	North-East
Kut Sathian	กุดสะเทียน	Si Bun Rueang	ศรีบุญเรือง	Nong Bua Lamphu	หนองบัวลำภู	North-East
Kut Sim Khum Mai	กุดสิมคุ้มใหม่	Khao Wong	เขาวง	Kalasin	กาฬสินธุ์	North-East
Kut Ta Phet	กุดตาเพชร	Lam Sonthi	ลำสนธิ	Lopburi	ลพบุรี	Central
Kut That	กุดธาตุ	Nong Na Kham	หนองนาคำ	Khon Kaen	ขอนแก่น	North-East
Kut Tum	กุดตุ้ม	Mueang Chaiyaphum	เมืองชัยภูมิ	Chaiyaphum	ชัยภูมิ	North-East
Kut Wa	กุดหว้า	Kuchinarai	กุฉินารายณ์	Kalasin	กาฬสินธุ์	North-East
Kut Wai	กุดหวาย	Sikhoraphum	ศีขรภูมิ	Surin	สุรินทร์	North-East
Kut Ya Luan	กุดยาลวน	Trakan Phuet Phon	ตระการพืชผล	Ubon Ratchathani	อุบลราชธานี	North-East
Kut Yom	กุดยม	Phu Khiao	ภูเขียว	Chaiyaphum	ชัยภูมิ	North-East
Kutakai	กุตาไก้	Pla Pak	ปลาปาก	Nakhon Phanom	นครพนม	North-East
Kutsakon	กุศกร	Trakan Phuet Phon	ตระการพืชผล	Ubon Ratchathani	อุบลราชธานี	North-East
Kwang Chon	กวางโจน	Phu Khiao	ภูเขียว	Chaiyaphum	ชัยภูมิ	North-East
Kwian Hak	เกวียนหัก	Khlung	ขลุง	Chanthaburi	จันทบุรี	East

== See also ==
- Organization of the government of Thailand
- List of districts of Thailand
- List of districts of Bangkok
- List of tambon in Thailand
- Provinces of Thailand
- List of municipalities in Thailand
