= Khiriwong =

Coordinates: 8.449569°N 98.828654°E

Khiriwong (Thai: คีรีวง, also spelled Khiri Wong) is a village in Nakhon Si Thammarat Province of Thailand. It is known as the best ozone area in Thailand. It is located in the Kamlon, Lan Saka district in Nakhon Si Thammarat, southern Thailand.

== Geography ==
Khiriwong covers 90.42 square kilometres (34.91 sq mi) and has 5 villages. It is bordered to the north by the Yodpon Mountain and to the south by Huay Sang Mountain. To the east is Ringo Mountain and west is Khao Luang Mountain Surat Thani Province. This village is about 20 kilometres (12 mi) from capital of province Mueang Nakhon Si Thammarat.

== Climate ==
Kiriwong is located in the central Malay peninsula and surrounded by mountain; therefore, it receives monsoon rains. So, it has rain throughout a whole year and also quite cold compared to lower areas. The average rainfall throughout the year is 3,500–4,000 millimetres (137.8–157.5 in). The minimum temperature is 15–17 °C (59–63 °F) in December, and highest temperature reaches 28–30 °C (82–86 °F) in April.

== History ==
Kiriwong has been located in this area for over 200 years, formerly known as Bann Khun because it is located near the top of a hill in the mountains of Nakhon Si Thammarat. Later, it was renamed as "Baan Khiriwong" according to the name of the Khiriwong temple, which means "House within the circle of the mountain".

In the past, it was regarded as an area far from prosperity and always encountering natural disasters such as flash flooding with was also the site of the Communist Party of Thailand in the 1970s as well.

== Economy ==
The area is mostly used for growing fruits and there are many orchards. It is advertised to tourists as having the best air in Thailand. There are many interesting activities in Khiriwong Village provided for tourists, such as riding a bicycle around the village and homestay accommodations. Tourists can taste the local foods and the local fruits, including learning or trying batik making, which is a famous and popular local product. Besides, tourists can also enjoy swimming in shady streams and waterfalls.
