= Phrom Khiri district =

Phrom Khiri พรหมคีรี
- District
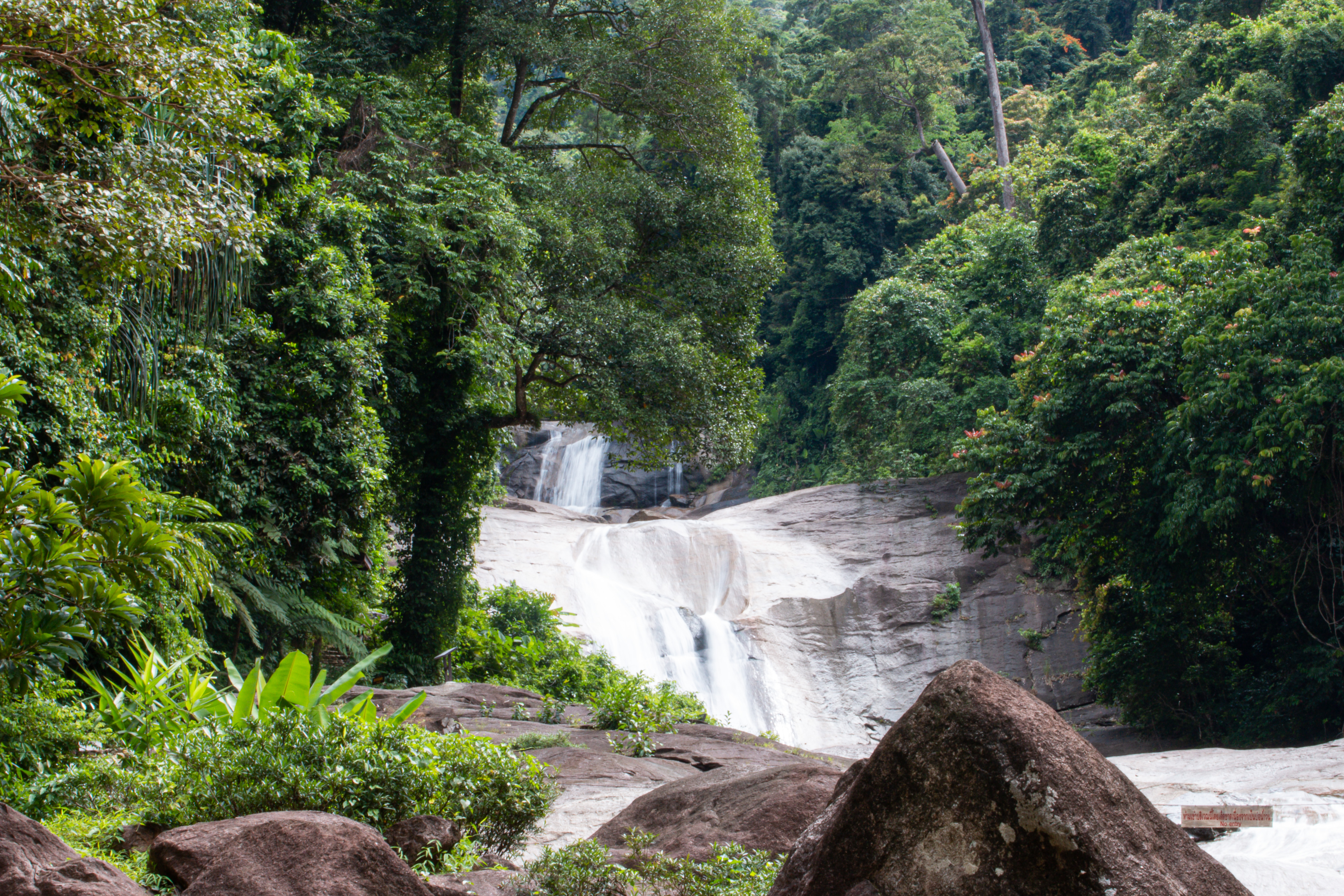
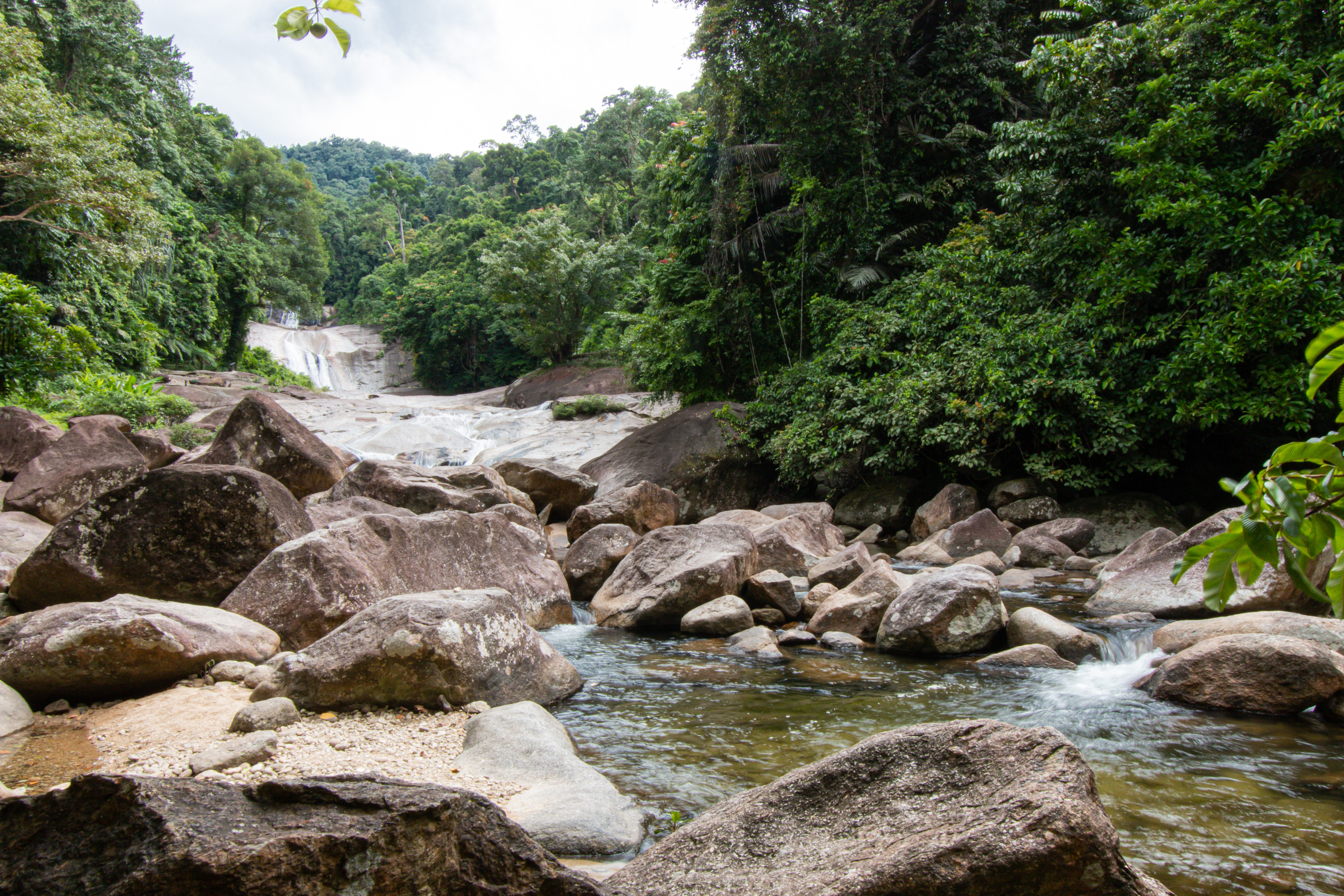
- Phromlok Waterfall, part of Khao Luang National Park

- District location in Nakhon Si Thammarat province
- Coordinates: 8°31′18″N 99°49′30″E
- Country: Thailand
- Province: Nakhon Si Thammarat
- Seat: Phrommalok

Area
  - Total: 321.50 km^{2} (124.13 sq mi)

Population (2012)
  - Total: 36,906
  - Density: 114.79/km^{2} (297.3/sq mi)
- Time zone: UTC+7 (ICT)
- Postal code: 80320
- Geocode: 8002

Phrom Khiri (Thai: พรหมคีรี, pronounced [pʰrōm kʰīː.rīː]) is a district (amphoe) of Nakhon Si Thammarat province, southern Thailand.

== History ==
On 26 August 1974 the minor district (king amphoe) Phrom Khiri was formed with the three tambons Phrom Lok, Ban Ko, and In Khiri split from Mueang Nakhon Si Thammarat district. On 13 July 1981 it was upgraded to a full district.

== Geography ==
Phrom Khiri is located 16 km (9.9 mi) from Nakhon Si Thammarat Airport, and taking approximately 20 minutes to reach.

The district is located in the midst of rubber plantations and surrounded by lush forests. Small streets allow access to the village.

Neighboring districts are (from the north clockwise): Nopphitam, Tha Sala, Mueang Nakhon Si Thammarat, Lan Saka, and Phipun.

== Administration ==
The district is divided into five sub-districts (tambons), which are further subdivided into 39 villages (mubans). There are two townships (thesaban tambons): Phrom Lok covers parts of tambons Phrom Lok and Ban Ko, and Thon Hong part of the same-named tambon. Each tambon has its non-municipal areas administered by a tambon administrative organization (TAO).

No.	Name	Thai name	Villages	Pop.
1.	Phrommalok	พรหมโลก	8	8,697
2.	Ban Ko	บ้านเกาะ	7	4,856
3.	In Khiri	อินคีรี	7	5,579
4.	Thon Hong	ทอนหงส์	9	10,977
5.	Na Riang	นาเรียง	8	5,506

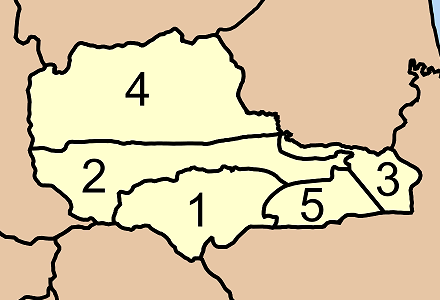

== Motto ==
The Phrom Khiri district's motto is "The land of fruit, clean waterfalls, precious nature, a variety of folk wisdom, inherit the culture".
