= Kalisa =

Kalisa is a surname. Notable people with the surname include:

- Claude Kalisa (born 1977), Rwandan footballer
- Karin Kalisa (born 1965), German writer
