= Karin Kalisa =

German writer

Karin Kalisa (born 1965) is a German writer.

She lived in Japan and Austria before settling in Berlin. She is a linguist and philosopher. Her first novel The Familiar Melody of Sung's Shop was translated into French. Other works include Sternstunde, Radio Activity and Bergsalz.
