= Khlong Hoi Khong district =

Khlong Hoi Khong คลองหอยโข่ง
- District
- District location in Songkhla province
- Coordinates: 6°53′57″N 100°23′19″E
- Country: Thailand
- Province: Songkhla
- Seat: Khlong Hoi Khong

Area
  - Total: 275.2 km^{2} (106.3 sq mi)

Population (2005)
  - Total: 23,504
  - Density: 85.4/km^{2} (221/sq mi)
- Time zone: UTC+7 (ICT)
- Postal code: 90230
- Geocode: 9016

Khlong Hoi Khong (Thai: คลองหอยโข่ง, pronounced [kʰlɔ̄ːŋ hɔ̌j kʰòːŋ]) is a district (amphoe) of Songkhla province, southern Thailand.

== History ==
The minor district (king amphoe) was established on 1 April 1992 by splitting off the three tambons, Khlong Hoi Khong, Khok Muang, and Thung Lan, from Hat Yai district. It was upgraded to a full district on 11 October 1997.

== Geography ==
Neighboring districts are (from the north clockwise): Hat Yai and Sadao of Songkhla Province and Khuan Kalong of Satun province.

== Administration ==
The district is divided into four sub-districts (tambond), which are further subdivided into 32 villages (mubans). There are no municipal (thesaban) areas within the district; there are four tambon administrative organizations (TAO).

No.	Name	Thai name	Villages	Pop.
1.	Khlong Hoi Khong	คลองหอยโข่ง	7	5,408
2.	Thung Lan	ทุ่งลาน	9	6,141
3.	Khok Muang	โคกม่วง	9	7,232
4.	Khlong La	คลองหลา	7	4,723
