= Phipun district =

Phipun พิปูน
- District
- Khlong Din Dang Water Reservoir, Nueafa Waterfall
- District location in Nakhon Si Thammarat province
- Coordinates: 8°33′36″N 99°36′30″E
- Country: Thailand
- Province: Nakhon Si Thammarat
- Seat: Phipun

Area
  - Total: 363.8 km^{2} (140.5 sq mi)

Population (2005)
  - Total: 27,578
  - Density: 75.8/km^{2} (196/sq mi)
- Time zone: UTC+7 (ICT)
- Postal code: 80270
- Geocode: 8005

Phipun (Thai: พิปูน, pronounced [pʰí.pūːn]) is a district (amphoe) in the northern part of Nakhon Si Thammarat province, southern Thailand.

== Geography ==
Neighboring districts are (from the northeast clockwise): Nopphitam, Phrom Khiri, Lan Saka, and Chawang of Nakhon Si Thammarat Province; Wiang Sa and Ban Na San of Surat Thani province.

== History ==
The minor district (king amphoe) was created on 1 September 1972, when the two tambons Phipun and Kathun were split off from Chawang district. It was upgraded to a full district on 8 September 1976.

== Administration ==
The district is divided into five sub-districts (tambons), which are further subdivided into 43 villages (mubans).

No.	Name	Thai name	Villages	Pop.
1.	Phipun	พิปูน	7	5,103
2.	Kathun	กะทูน	9	5,398
3.	Khao Phra	เขาพระ	12	7,557
4.	Yang Khom	ยางค้อม	9	5,507
5.	Khuan Klang	ควนกลาง	6	4,013

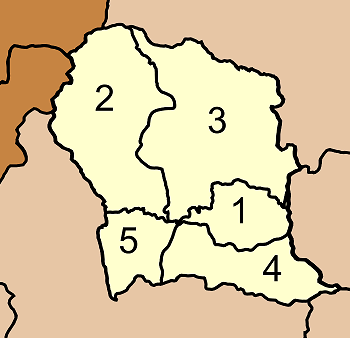

=== Local administration ===
There are 4 sub-district municipality (thesaban tambon) in the district:

- Phipun (Thai: เทศบาลตำบลพิปูน) consisting of part of sub-district Phipun.
- Kathun (Thai: เทศบาลตำบลกะทูน) consisting of sub-district Kathun.
- Khao Phra (Thai: เทศบาลตำบลเขาพระ) consisting of sub-district Khao Phra.
- Khuan Klang (Thai: เทศบาลตำบลควนกลาง) consisting of sub-district Khuan Klang.

There are two tambon administrative organisations (TAO) in the district:

- Phipun (Thai: องค์การบริหารส่วนตำบลพิปูน) consisting of sub-district Phipun.
- Yang Khom (Thai: องค์การบริหารส่วนตำบลยางค้อม) consisting of sub-district Yang Khom.
