= Kaeng Khro district =

Kaeng Khro แก้งคร้อ
- District
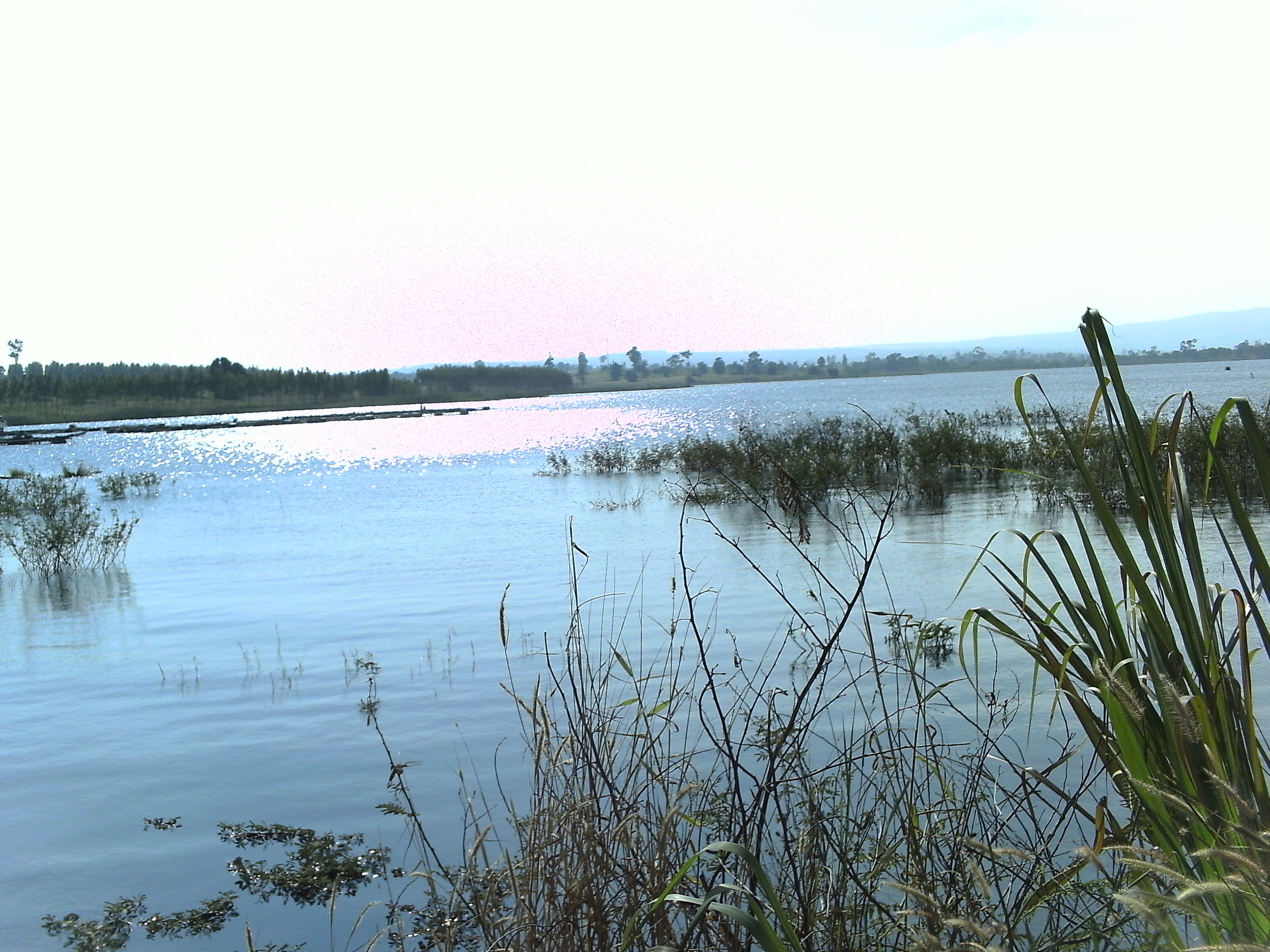
- Khuean Bon Reservoir

- District location in Chaiyaphum province
- Coordinates: 16°6′31″N 102°15′29″E
- Country: Thailand
- Province: Chaiyaphum

Area
  - Total: 582.2 km^{2} (224.8 sq mi)

Population (2000)
  - Total: 87,663
  - Density: 150.6/km^{2} (390/sq mi)
- Time zone: UTC+7 (ICT)
- Postal code: 36150
- Geocode: 3612

Kaeng Khro (Thai: แก้งคร้อ, pronounced [kɛ̂ːŋ kʰrɔ́ː]; Northeastern Thai: แก้งคร้อ, pronounced [kɛ̂ːŋ kʰɔ̏ː]) is a district in Chaiyaphum province, northeastern Thailand.
