= Lan Saka district =

Lan Saka ลานสกา
- District
- Kiriwong Village, Khao Chang Si Check Point
- District location in Nakhon Si Thammarat province
- Coordinates: 8°22′18″N 99°48′18″E
- Country: Thailand
- Province: Nakhon Si Thammarat
- Seat: Khao Kaeo

Area
  - Total: 342.90 km^{2} (132.39 sq mi)

Population (2012)
  - Total: 40,406
  - Density: 117.83/km^{2} (305.2/sq mi)
- Time zone: UTC+7 (ICT)
- Postal code: 80230
- Geocode: 8003

Lan Saka (Thai: ลานสกา, pronounced [lāːn sā.kāː]) is a district (amphoe) of Nakhon Si Thammarat province, southern Thailand.

== History ==
The district was at first a minor district (king amphoe) named Khao Kaeo (เขาแก้ว), which was a subordinate of Mueang Nakhon Si Thammarat district. When the district office was moved to tambon Lan Saka, the district was renamed accordingly. In 1958 it was upgraded to a full district.

== Geography ==
Neighboring districts are (from the north clockwise): Phrom Khiri, Mueang Nakhon Si Thammarat, Phra Phrom, Ron Phibun, Thung Song, Chang Klang, Chawang and Phipun.

Khao Luang National Park is in Lan Saka District.

== Administration ==
The district is divided into five sub-districts (tambons), which are further subdivided into 42 villages (mubans). Lan Saka is a township (thesaban tambon) which covers parts of tambon Khao Kaeo. There are a further five tambon administrative organizations.

No.	Name	Thai name	Villages	Pop.
1.	Khao Kaeo	เขาแก้ว	6	7,293
2.	Lan Saka	ลานสกา	7	5,775
3.	Tha Di	ท่าดี	7	8,031
4.	Kamlon	กำโลน	11	8,804
5.	Khun Thale	ขุนทะเล	11	10,135

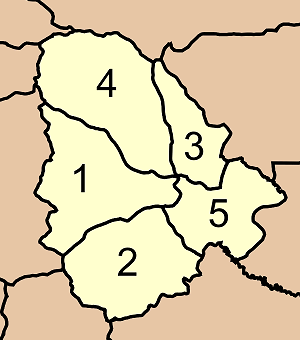
