= List of districts of Thailand =

As of 31 December 2018 there were 878 districts (amphoe) in Thailand. This table lists those districts, and the provinces (changwat) of Thailand and regions (phak) of Thailand in which they lie.

This sortable table does not include districts in Bangkok. See List of districts of Bangkok.

At the bottom follows a table with Thai names of the large regions.

District (amphoe)	อำเภอ	Province (changwat)	จังหวัด	Region (phak)
Akat Amnuai	อากาศอำนวย	Sakon Nakhon	สกลนคร	North-East
Amphawa	อัมพวา	Samut Songkhram	สมุทรสงคราม	Centre
Ao Luek	อ่าวลึก	Krabi	กระบี่	South
Aranyaprathet	อรัญประเทศ	Sa Kaeo	สระแก้ว	East
At Samat	อาจสามารถ	Roi Et	ร้อยเอ็ด	North-East
Bacho	บาเจาะ	Narathiwat	นราธิวาส	South
Bamnet Narong	บำเหน็จณรงค์	Chaiyaphum	ชัยภูมิ	North-East
Ban Bueng	บ้านบึง	Chonburi	ชลบุรี	East
Ban Chang	บ้านฉาง	Rayong	ระยอง	East
Ban Dan	บ้านด่าน	Buriram	บุรีรัมย์	North-East
Ban Dan Lan Hoi	บ้านด่านลานหอย	Sukhothai	สุโขทัย	Centre
Ban Dung	บ้านดุง	Udon Thani	อุดรธานี	North-East
Ban Fang	บ้านฝาง	Khon Kaen	ขอนแก่น	North-East
Ban Haet	บ้านแฮด	Khon Kaen	ขอนแก่น	North-East
Ban Hong	บ้านโฮ่ง	Lamphun	ลำพูน	North
Ban Kha	บ้านคา	Ratchaburi	ราชบุรี	West
Ban Khai	บ้านค่าย	Rayong	ระยอง	East
Ban Khok	บ้านโคก	Uttaradit	อุตรดิตถ์	North
Ban Khwao	บ้านเขว้า	Chaiyaphum	ชัยภูมิ	North-East
Ban Kruat	บ้านกรวด	Buriram	บุรีรัมย์	North-East
Ban Laem	บ้านแหลม	Phetchaburi	เพชรบุรี	West
Ban Lat	บ้านลาด	Phetchaburi	เพชรบุรี	West
Ban Luang	บ้านหลวง	Nan	น่าน	North
Ban Lueam	บ้านเหลื่อม	Nakhon Ratchasima	นครราชสีมา	North-East
Ban Mai Chaiyaphot	บ้านใหม่ไชยพจน์	Buriram	บุรีรัมย์	North-East
Ban Mi	บ้านหมี่	Lopburi	ลพบุรี	Centre
Ban Mo	บ้านหมอ	Saraburi	สระบุรี	Centre
Ban Muang	บ้านม่วง	Sakon Nakhon	สกลนคร	North-East
Ban Na	บ้านนา	Nakhon Nayok	นครนายก	Centre
Ban Na Doem	บ้านนาเดิม	Surat Thani	สุราษฎร์ธานี	South
Ban Na San	บ้านนาสาร	Surat Thani	สุราษฎร์ธานี	South
Ban Phaeng	บ้านแพง	Nakhon Phanom	นครพนม	North-East
Ban Phaeo	บ้านแพ้ว	Samut Sakhon	สมุทรสาคร	Centre
Ban Phai	บ้านไผ่	Khon Kaen	ขอนแก่น	North-East
Ban Pho	บ้านโพธิ์	Chachoengsao	ฉะเชิงเทรา	East
Ban Phraek	บ้านแพรก	Phra Nakhon Si Ayutthaya	พระนครศรีอยุธยา	Centre
Ban Phue	บ้านผือ	Udon Thani	อุดรธานี	North-East
Ban Pong	บ้านโป่ง	Ratchaburi	ราชบุรี	West
Ban Rai	บ้านไร่	Uthai Thani	อุทัยธานี	Centre
Ban Sang	บ้านสร้าง	Prachinburi	ปราจีนบุรี	East
Ban Ta Khun	บ้านตาขุน	Surat Thani	สุราษฎร์ธานี	South
Ban Tak	บ้านตาก	Tak	ตาก	West
Ban Thaen	บ้านแท่น	Chaiyaphum	ชัยภูมิ	North-East
Ban Thi	บ้านธิ	Lamphun	ลำพูน	North
Bang Ban	บางบาล	Phra Nakhon Si Ayutthaya	พระนครศรีอยุธยา	Centre
Bang Bo	บางบ่อ	Samut Prakan	สมุทรปราการ	Centre
Bang Bua Thong	บางบัวทอง	Nonthaburi	นนทบุรี	Centre
Bang Kaeo	บางแก้ว	Phatthalung	พัทลุง	South
Bang Khan	บางขัน	Nakhon Si Thammarat	นครศรีธรรมราช	South
Bang Khla	บางคล้า	Chachoengsao	ฉะเชิงเทรา	East
Bang Khonthi	บางคนที	Samut Songkhram	สมุทรสงคราม	Centre
Bang Klam	บางกล่ำ	Songkhla	สงขลา	South
Bang Krathum	บางกระทุ่ม	Phitsanulok	พิษณุโลก	Centre
Bang Kruai	บางกรวย	Nonthaburi	นนทบุรี	Centre
Bang Lamung	บางละมุง	Chonburi	ชลบุรี	East
Bang Len	บางเลน	Nakhon Pathom	นครปฐม	Centre
Bang Mun Nak	บางมูลนาก	Phichit	พิจิตร	Centre
Bang Nam Priao	บางน้ำเปรี้ยว	Chachoengsao	ฉะเชิงเทรา	East
Bang Pa-in	บางปะอิน	Phra Nakhon Si Ayutthaya	พระนครศรีอยุธยา	Centre
Bang Pahan	บางปะหัน	Phra Nakhon Si Ayutthaya	พระนครศรีอยุธยา	Centre
Bang Pakong	บางปะกง	Chachoengsao	ฉะเชิงเทรา	East
Bang Phae	บางแพ	Ratchaburi	ราชบุรี	West
Bang Phli	บางพลี	Samut Prakan	สมุทรปราการ	Centre
Bang Pla Ma	บางปลาม้า	Suphan Buri	สุพรรณบุรี	Centre
Bang Rachan	บางระจัน	Sing Buri	สิงห์บุรี	Centre
Bang Rakam	บางระกำ	Phitsanulok	พิษณุโลก	Centre
Bang Sai 1404	บางไทร	Phra Nakhon Si Ayutthaya	พระนครศรีอยุธยา	Centre
Bang Sai 1413	บางซ้าย	Phra Nakhon Si Ayutthaya	พระนครศรีอยุธยา	Centre
Bang Sao Thong	บางเสาธง	Samut Prakan	สมุทรปราการ	Centre
Bang Saphan	บางสะพาน	Prachuap Khiri Khan	ประจวบคีรีขันธ์	West
Bang Saphan Noi	บางสะพานน้อย	Prachuap Khiri Khan	ประจวบคีรีขันธ์	West
Bang Yai	บางใหญ่	Nonthaburi	นนทบุรี	Centre
Bannang Sata	บันนังสตา	Yala	ยะลา	South
Banphot Phisai	บรรพตพิสัย	Nakhon Sawan	นครสวรรค์	Centre
Benchalak	เบญจลักษ์	Sisaket	ศรีสะเกษ	North-East
Betong	เบตง	Yala	ยะลา	South
Bo Kluea	บ่อเกลือ	Nan	น่าน	North
Bo Phloi	บ่อพลอย	Kanchanaburi	กาญจนบุรี	West
Bo Rai	บ่อไร่	Trat	ตราด	East
Bo Thong	บ่อทอง	Chonburi	ชลบุรี	East
Borabue	บรบือ	Maha Sarakham	มหาสารคาม	North-East
Bua Lai	บัวลาย	Nakhon Ratchasima	นครราชสีมา	North-East
Bua Yai	บัวใหญ่	Nakhon Ratchasima	นครราชสีมา	North-East
Buachet	บัวเชด	Surin	สุรินทร์	North-East
Bueng Bun	บึงบูรพ์	Sisaket	ศรีสะเกษ	North-East
Bueng Khong Long	บึงโขงหลง	Bueng Kan	บึงกาฬ	North-East
Bueng Na Rang	บึงนาราง	Phichit	พิจิตร	Centre
Bueng Sam Phan	บึงสามพัน	Phetchabun	เพชรบูรณ์	Centre
Bueng Samakkhi	บึงสามัคคี	Kamphaeng Phet	กำแพงเพชร	Centre
Bung Khla	บุ่งคล้า	Bueng Kan	บึงกาฬ	North-East
Buntharik	บุณฑริก	Ubon Ratchathani	อุบลราชธานี	North-East
Cha-am	ชะอำ	Phetchaburi	เพชรบุรี	West
Cha-uat	ชะอวด	Nakhon Si Thammarat	นครศรีธรรมราช	South
Chae Hom	แจ้ห่ม	Lampang	ลำปาง	North
Chai Badan	ชัยบาดาล	Lopburi	ลพบุรี	Centre
Chaiyo	ไชโย	Ang Thong	อ่างทอง	Centre
Chai Buri	ชัยบุรี	Surat Thani	สุราษฎร์ธานี	South
Chai Prakan	ไชยปราการ	Chiang Mai	เชียงใหม่	North
Chai Wan	ไชยวาน	Udon Thani	อุดรธานี	North-East
Chaiya	ไชยา	Surat Thani	สุราษฎร์ธานี	South
Chaloem Phra Kiat	เฉลิมพระเกียรติ	Nakhon Ratchasima	นครราชสีมา	North-East
Chaloem Phra Kiat	เฉลิมพระเกียรติ	Buriram	บุรีรัมย์	North-East
Chaloem Phra Kiat	เฉลิมพระเกียรติ	Nakhon Si Thammarat	นครศรีธรรมราช	South
Chaloem Phra Kiat	เฉลิมพระเกียรติ	Saraburi	สระบุรี	Centre
Chaloem Phra Kiat	เฉลิมพระเกียรติ	Nan	น่าน	North
Chakkarat	จักราช	Nakhon Ratchasima	นครราชสีมา	North-East
Chamni	ชำนิ	Buriram	บุรีรัมย์	North-East
Chana	จะนะ	Songkhla	สงขลา	South
Chanae	จะแนะ	Narathiwat	นราธิวาส	South
Changhan	จังหาร	Roi Et	ร้อยเอ็ด	North-East
Chang Klang	ช้างกลาง	Nakhon Si Thammarat	นครศรีธรรมราช	South
Chanuman	ชานุมาน	Amnat Charoen	อำนาจเจริญ	North-East
Charoen Sin	เจริญศิลป์	Sakon Nakhon	สกลนคร	North-East
Chat Trakan	ชาติตระการ	Phitsanulok	พิษณุโลก	Centre
Chatturat	จัตุรัส	Chaiyaphum	ชัยภูมิ	North-East
Chaturaphak Phiman	จตุรพักตรพิมาน	Roi Et	ร้อยเอ็ด	North-East
Chawang	ฉวาง	Nakhon Si Thammarat	นครศรีธรรมราช	South
Chian Yai	เชียรใหญ่	Nakhon Si Thammarat	นครศรีธรรมราช	South
Chiang Dao	เชียงดาว	Chiang Mai	เชียงใหม่	North
Chiang Kham	เชียงคำ	Phayao	พะเยา	North
Chiang Khan	เชียงคาน	Loei	เลย	North-East
Chiang Khong	เชียงของ	Chiang Rai	เชียงราย	North
Chiang Khwan	เชียงขวัญ	Roi Et	ร้อยเอ็ด	North-East
Chiang Klang	เชียงกลาง	Nan	น่าน	North
Chiang Muan	เชียงม่วน	Phayao	พะเยา	North
Chiang Saen	เชียงแสน	Chiang Rai	เชียงราย	North
Chiang Yuen	เชียงยืน	Maha Sarakham	มหาสารคาม	North-East
Cho-airong	เจาะไอร้อง	Narathiwat	นราธิวาส	South
Chok Chai	โชคชัย	Nakhon Ratchasima	นครราชสีมา	North-East
Chom Bueng	จอมบึง	Ratchaburi	ราชบุรี	West
Chom Phra	จอมพระ	Surin	สุรินทร์	North-East
Chom Thong	จอมทอง	Chiang Mai	เชียงใหม่	North
Chon Daen	ชนแดน	Phetchabun	เพชรบูรณ์	Centre
Chonnabot	ชนบท	Khon Kaen	ขอนแก่น	North-East
Chuen Chom	ชื่นชม	Maha Sarakham	มหาสารคาม	North-East
Chulabhorn	จุฬาภรณ์	Nakhon Si Thammarat	นครศรีธรรมราช	South
Chum Phae	ชุมแพ	Khon Kaen	ขอนแก่น	North-East
Chum Phuang	ชุมพวง	Nakhon Ratchasima	นครราชสีมา	North-East
Chum Saeng	ชุมแสง	Nakhon Sawan	นครสวรรค์	Centre
Chum Ta Bong	ชุมตาบง	Nakhon Sawan	นครสวรรค์	Centre
Chumphon Buri	ชุมพลบุรี	Surin	สุรินทร์	North-East
Chun	จุน	Phayao	พะเยา	North
Damnoen Saduak	ดำเนินสะดวก	Ratchaburi	ราชบุรี	West
Dan Chang	ด่านช้าง	Suphan Buri	สุพรรณบุรี	Centre
Dan Khun Thot	ด่านขุนทด	Nakhon Ratchasima	นครราชสีมา	North-East
Dan Makham Tia	ด่านมะขามเตี้ย	Kanchanaburi	กาญจนบุรี	West
Dan Sai	ด่านซ้าย	Loei	เลย	North-East
Den Chai	เด่นชัย	Phrae	แพร่	North
Det Udom	เดชอุดม	Ubon Ratchathani	อุบลราชธานี	North-East
Doem Bang Nang Buat	เดิมบางนางบวช	Suphan Buri	สุพรรณบุรี	Centre
Doi Lo	ดอยหล่อ	Chiang Mai	เชียงใหม่	North
Doi Luang	ดอยหลวง	Chiang Rai	เชียงราย	North
Doi Saket	ดอยสะเก็ด	Chiang Mai	เชียงใหม่	North
Doi Tao	ดอยเต่า	Chiang Mai	เชียงใหม่	North
Dok Khamtai	ดอกคำใต้	Phayao	พะเยา	North
Don Chan	ดอนจาน	Kalasin	กาฬสินธุ์	North-East
Don Chedi	ดอนเจดีย์	Suphan Buri	สุพรรณบุรี	Centre
Don Mot Daeng	ดอนมดแดง	Ubon Ratchathani	อุบลราชธานี	North-East
Don Phut	ดอนพุด	Saraburi	สระบุรี	Centre
Don Sak	ดอนสัก	Surat Thani	สุราษฎร์ธานี	South
Don Tan	ดอนตาล	Mukdahan	มุกดาหาร	North-East
Don Tum	ดอนตูม	Nakhon Pathom	นครปฐม	Centre
Dong Charoen	ดงเจริญ	Phichit	พิจิตร	Centre
Dong Luang	ดงหลวง	Mukdahan	มุกดาหาร	North-East
Erawan	เอราวัณ	Loei	เลย	North-East
Fak Tha	ฟากท่า	Uttaradit	อุตรดิตถ์	North
Fang	ฝาง	Chiang Mai	เชียงใหม่	North
Fao Rai	เฝ้าไร่	Nong Khai	หนองคาย	North-East
Galyani Vadhana	กัลยาณิวัฒนา	Chiang Mai	เชียงใหม่	North
Hang Chat	ห้างฉัตร	Lampang	ลำปาง	North
Hang Dong	หางดง	Chiang Mai	เชียงใหม่	North
Hankha	หันคา	Chai Nat	ชัยนาท	Centre
Hat Samran	หาดสำราญ	Trang	ตรัง	South
Hat Yai	หาดใหญ่	Songkhla	สงขลา	South
Hot	ฮอด	Chiang Mai	เชียงใหม่	North
Hua Hin	หัวหิน	Prachuap Khiri Khan	ประจวบคีรีขันธ์	West
Hua Sai	หัวไทร	Nakhon Si Thammarat	นครศรีธรรมราช	South
Hua Taphan	หัวตะพาน	Amnat Charoen	อำนาจเจริญ	North-East
Huai Khot	ห้วยคต	Uthai Thani	อุทัยธานี	Centre
Huai Krachao	ห้วยกระเจา	Kanchanaburi	กาญจนบุรี	West
Huai Mek	ห้วยเม็ก	Kalasin	กาฬสินธุ์	North-East
Huai Phueng	ห้วยผึ้ง	Kalasin	กาฬสินธุ์	North-East
Huai Rat	ห้วยราช	Buriram	บุรีรัมย์	North-East
Huai Thalaeng	ห้วยแถลง	Nakhon Ratchasima	นครราชสีมา	North-East
Huai Thap Than	ห้วยทับทัน	Sisaket	ศรีสะเกษ	North-East
Huai Yot	ห้วยยอด	Trang	ตรัง	South
In Buri	อินทร์บุรี	Sing Buri	สิงห์บุรี	Centre
Kabang	กาบัง	Yala	ยะลา	South
Kabin Buri	กบินทร์บุรี	Prachinburi	ปราจีนบุรี	East
Kae Dam	แกดำ	Maha Sarakham	มหาสารคาม	North-East
Kaeng Hang Maeo	แก่งหางแมว	Chanthaburi	จันทบุรี	East
Kaeng Khoi	แก่งคอย	Saraburi	สระบุรี	Centre
Kaeng Khro	แก้งคร้อ	Chaiyaphum	ชัยภูมิ	North-East
Kaeng Krachan	แก่งกระจาน	Phetchaburi	เพชรบุรี	West
Kaeng Sanam Nang	แก้งสนามนาง	Nakhon Ratchasima	นครราชสีมา	North-East
Kamalasai	กมลาไสย	Kalasin	กาฬสินธุ์	North-East
Kamphaeng Saen	กำแพงแสน	Nakhon Pathom	นครปฐม	Centre
Kanchanadit	กาญจนดิษฐ์	Surat Thani	สุราษฎร์ธานี	South
Kantang	กันตัง	Trang	ตรัง	South
Kantharalak	กันทรลักษ์	Sisaket	ศรีสะเกษ	North-East
Kanthararom	กันทรารมย์	Sisaket	ศรีสะเกษ	North-East
Kantharawichai	กันทรวิชัย	Maha Sarakham	มหาสารคาม	North-East
Kao Liao	เก้าเลี้ยว	Nakhon Sawan	นครสวรรค์	Centre
Kap Choeng	กาบเชิง	Surin	สุรินทร์	North-East
Kapho	กะพ้อ	Pattani	ปัตตานี	South
Kapoe	กะเปอร์	Ranong	ระนอง	South
Kapong	กะปง	Phang Nga	พังงา	South
Kaset Sombun	เกษตรสมบูรณ์	Chaiyaphum	ชัยภูมิ	North-East
Kaset Wisai	เกษตรวิสัย	Roi Et	ร้อยเอ็ด	North-East
Kathu	กะทู้	Phuket	ภูเก็ต	South
Khaen Dong	แคนดง	Buriram	บุรีรัมย์	North-East
Khai Bang Rachan	ค่ายบางระจัน	Sing Buri	สิงห์บุรี	Centre
Kham Khuean Kaeo	คำเขื่อนแก้ว	Yasothon	ยโสธร	North-East
Kham Muang	คำม่วง	Kalasin	กาฬสินธุ์	North-East
Kham Sakaesaeng	ขามสะแกแสง	Nakhon Ratchasima	นครราชสีมา	North-East
Kham Ta Kla	คำตากล้า	Sakon Nakhon	สกลนคร	North-East
Kham Thale So	ขามทะเลสอ	Nakhon Ratchasima	นครราชสีมา	North-East
Khamcha-i	คำชะอี	Mukdahan	มุกดาหาร	North-East
Khanom	ขนอม	Nakhon Si Thammarat	นครศรีธรรมราช	South
Khanu Woralaksaburi	ขาณุวรลักษบุรี	Kamphaeng Phet	กำแพงเพชร	Centre
Khao Chaison	เขาชัยสน	Phatthalung	พัทลุง	South
Khao Chakan	เขาฉกรรจ์	Sa Kaeo	สระแก้ว	East
Khao Chamao	เขาชะเมา	Rayong	ระยอง	East
Khao Khitchakut	เขาคิชฌกูฏ	Chanthaburi	จันทบุรี	East
Khao Kho	เขาค้อ	Phetchabun	เพชรบูรณ์	Centre
Khao Phanom	เขาพนม	Krabi	กระบี่	South
Khao Saming	เขาสมิง	Trat	ตราด	East
Khao Suan Kwang	เขาสวนกวาง	Khon Kaen	ขอนแก่น	North-East
Khao Wong	เขาวง	Kalasin	กาฬสินธุ์	North-East
Khao Yoi	เขาย้อย	Phetchaburi	เพชรบุรี	West
Khemarat	เขมราฐ	Ubon Ratchathani	อุบลราชธานี	North-East
Khian Sa	เคียนซา	Surat Thani	สุราษฎร์ธานี	South
Khiri Mat	คีรีมาศ	Sukhothai	สุโขทัย	Centre
Khiri Rat Nikhom	คีรีรัฐนิคม	Surat Thani	สุราษฎร์ธานี	South
Khlong Hat	คลองหาด	Sa Kaeo	สระแก้ว	East
Khlong Hoi Khong	คลองหอยโข่ง	Songkhla	สงขลา	South
Khlong Khlung	คลองขลุง	Kamphaeng Phet	กำแพงเพชร	Centre
Khlong Khuean	คลองเขื่อน	Chachoengsao	ฉะเชิงเทรา	East
Khlong Lan	คลองลาน	Kamphaeng Phet	กำแพงเพชร	Centre
Khlong Luang	คลองหลวง	Pathum Thani	ปทุมธานี	Centre
Khlong Thom	คลองท่อม	Krabi	กระบี่	South
Khlong Yai	คลองใหญ่	Trat	ตราด	East
Khlung	ขลุง	Chanthaburi	จันทบุรี	East
Kho Wang	ค้อวัง	Yasothon	ยโสธร	North-East
Khok Charoen	โคกเจริญ	Lopburi	ลพบุรี	Centre
Khok Pho	โคกโพธิ์	Pattani	ปัตตานี	South
Khok Pho Chai	โคกโพธิ์ไชย	Khon Kaen	ขอนแก่น	North-East
Khok Samrong	โคกสำโรง	Lopburi	ลพบุรี	Centre
Khok Si Suphan	โคกศรีสุพรรณ	Sakon Nakhon	สกลนคร	North-East
Khok Sung	โคกสูง	Sa Kaeo	สระแก้ว	East
Khon Buri	ครบุรี	Nakhon Ratchasima	นครราชสีมา	North-East
Khon San	คอนสาร	Chaiyaphum	ชัยภูมิ	North-East
Khon Sawan	คอนสวรรค์	Chaiyaphum	ชัยภูมิ	North-East
Khong	คง	Nakhon Ratchasima	นครราชสีมา	North-East
Khong Chai	ฆ้องชัย	Kalasin	กาฬสินธุ์	North-East
Khong Chiam	โขงเจียม	Ubon Ratchathani	อุบลราชธานี	North-East
Khu Mueang	คูเมือง	Buriram	บุรีรัมย์	North-East
Khuan Don	ควนโดน	Satun	สตูล	South
Khuan Kalong	ควนกาหลง	Satun	สตูล	South
Khuan Khanun	ควนขนุน	Phatthalung	พัทลุง	South
Khuan Niang	ควนเนียง	Songkhla	สงขลา	South
Khueang Nai	เขื่องใน	Ubon Ratchathani	อุบลราชธานี	North-East
Khukhan	ขุขันธ์	Sisaket	ศรีสะเกษ	North-East
Khun Han	ขุนหาญ	Sisaket	ศรีสะเกษ	North-East
Khun Tan	ขุนตาล	Chiang Rai	เชียงราย	North
Khun Yuam	ขุนยวม	Mae Hong Son	แม่ฮ่องสอน	North
Khura Buri	คุระบุรี	Phang Nga	พังงา	South
Khwao Sinarin	เขวาสินรินทร์	Surin	สุรินทร์	North-East
Klaeng	แกลง	Rayong	ระยอง	East
Ko Chan	เกาะจันทร์	Chonburi	ชลบุรี	East
Ko Chang	เกาะช้าง	Trat	ตราด	East
Ko Kha	เกาะคา	Lampang	ลำปาง	North
Ko Kut	เกาะกูด	Trat	ตราด	East
Ko Lanta	เกาะลันตา	Krabi	กระบี่	South
Ko Pha-ngan	เกาะพะงัน	Surat Thani	สุราษฎร์ธานี	South
Ko Samui	เกาะสมุย	Surat Thani	สุราษฎร์ธานี	South
Ko Sichang	เกาะสีชัง	Chonburi	ชลบุรี	East
Ko Yao	เกาะยาว	Phang Nga	พังงา	South
Kong Krailat	กงไกรลาศ	Sukhothai	สุโขทัย	Centre
Kong Ra	กงหรา	Phatthalung	พัทลุง	South
Kosamphi Nakhon	โกสัมพีนคร	Kamphaeng Phet	กำแพงเพชร	Centre
Kosum Phisai	โกสุมพิสัย	Maha Sarakham	มหาสารคาม	North-East
Kra Buri	กระบุรี	Ranong	ระนอง	South
Kranuan	กระนวน	Khon Kaen	ขอนแก่น	North-East
Krasae Sin	กระแสสินธุ์	Songkhla	สงขลา	South
Krasang	กระสัง	Buriram	บุรีรัมย์	North-East
Krathum Baen	กระทุ่มแบน	Samut Sakhon	สมุทรสาคร	Centre
Krok Phra	โกรกพระ	Nakhon Sawan	นครสวรรค์	Centre
Krong Pinang	กรงปินัง	Yala	ยะลา	South
Ku Kaeo	กู่แก้ว	Udon Thani	อุดรธานี	North-East
Kuchinarai	กุฉินารายณ์	Kalasin	กาฬสินธุ์	North-East
Kui Buri	กุยบุรี	Prachuap Khiri Khan	ประจวบคีรีขันธ์	West
Kumphawapi	กุมภวาปี	Udon Thani	อุดรธานี	North-East
Kusuman	กุสุมาลย์	Sakon Nakhon	สกลนคร	North-East
Kut Bak	กุดบาก	Sakon Nakhon	สกลนคร	North-East
Kut Chap	กุดจับ	Udon Thani	อุดรธานี	North-East
Kut Chum	กุดชุม	Yasothon	ยโสธร	North-East
Kut Khaopun	กุดข้าวปุ้น	Ubon Ratchathani	อุบลราชธานี	North-East
Kut Rang	กุดรัง	Maha Sarakham	มหาสารคาม	North-East
La-ngu	ละงู	Satun	สตูล	South
La-un	ละอุ่น	Ranong	ระนอง	South
Laem Ngop	แหลมงอบ	Trat	ตราด	East
Laem Sing	แหลมสิงห์	Chanthaburi	จันทบุรี	East
Lahan Sai	ละหานทราย	Buriram	บุรีรัมย์	North-East
Lam Luk Ka	ลำลูกกา	Pathum Thani	ปทุมธานี	Centre
Lam Plai Mat	ลำปลายมาศ	Buriram	บุรีรัมย์	North-East
Lam Sonthi	ลำสนธิ	Lopburi	ลพบุรี	Centre
Lam Thamenchai	ลำทะเมนชัย	Nakhon Ratchasima	นครราชสีมา	North-East
Lam Thap	ลำทับ	Krabi	กระบี่	South
Lamae	ละแม	Chumphon	ชุมพร	South
Lamduan	ลำดวน	Surin	สุรินทร์	North-East
Lan Krabue	ลานกระบือ	Kamphaeng Phet	กำแพงเพชร	Centre
Lan Sak	ลานสัก	Uthai Thani	อุทัยธานี	Centre
Lan Saka	ลานสกา	Nakhon Si Thammarat	นครศรีธรรมราช	South
Lang Suan	หลังสวน	Chumphon	ชุมพร	South
Lao Khwan	เลาขวัญ	Kanchanaburi	กาญจนบุรี	West
Lao Suea Kok	เหล่าเสือโก้ก	Ubon Ratchathani	อุบลราชธานี	North-East
Laplae	ลับแล	Uttaradit	อุตรดิตถ์	North
Lat Bua Luang	ลาดบัวหลวง	Phra Nakhon Si Ayutthaya	พระนครศรีอยุธยา	Centre
Lat Lum Kaeo	ลาดหลุมแก้ว	Pathum Thani	ปทุมธานี	Centre
Lat Yao	ลาดยาว	Nakhon Sawan	นครสวรรค์	Centre
Li	ลี้	Lamphun	ลำพูน	North
Loeng Nok Tha	เลิงนกทา	Yasothon	ยโสธร	North-East
Lom Kao	หล่มเก่า	Phetchabun	เพชรบูรณ์	Centre
Lom Sak	หล่มสัก	Phetchabun	เพชรบูรณ์	Centre
Long	ลอง	Phrae	แพร่	North
Lue Amnat	ลืออำนาจ	Amnat Charoen	อำนาจเจริญ	North-East
Mae Ai	แม่อาย	Chiang Mai	เชียงใหม่	North
Mae Charim	แม่จริม	Nan	น่าน	North
Mae Chaem	แม่แจ่ม	Chiang Mai	เชียงใหม่	North
Mae Chai	แม่ใจ	Phayao	พะเยา	North
Mae Chan	แม่จัน	Chiang Rai	เชียงราย	North
Mae Fa Luang	แม่ฟ้าหลวง	Chiang Rai	เชียงราย	North
Mae La Noi	แม่ลาน้อย	Mae Hong Son	แม่ฮ่องสอน	North
Mae Lan	แม่ลาน	Pattani	ปัตตานี	South
Mae Lao	แม่ลาว	Chiang Rai	เชียงราย	North
Mae Mo	แม่เมาะ	Lampang	ลำปาง	North
Mae On	แม่ออน	Chiang Mai	เชียงใหม่	North
Mae Phrik	แม่พริก	Lampang	ลำปาง	North
Mae Poen	แม่เปิน	Nakhon Sawan	นครสวรรค์	Centre
Mae Ramat	แม่ระมาด	Tak	ตาก	West
Mae Rim	แม่ริม	Chiang Mai	เชียงใหม่	North
Mae Sai	แม่สาย	Chiang Rai	เชียงราย	North
Mae Sariang	แม่สะเรียง	Mae Hong Son	แม่ฮ่องสอน	North
Mae Sot	แม่สอด	Tak	ตาก	West
Mae Suai	แม่สรวย	Chiang Rai	เชียงราย	North
Mae Taeng	แม่แตง	Chiang Mai	เชียงใหม่	North
Mae Tha, Lampang	แม่ทะ	Lampang	ลำปาง	North
Mae Tha, Lamphun	แม่ทา	Lamphun	ลำพูน	North
Mae Wang	แม่วาง	Chiang Mai	เชียงใหม่	North
Mae Wong	แม่วงก์	Nakhon Sawan	นครสวรรค์	Centre
Maha Chana Chai	มหาชนะชัย	Yasothon	ยโสธร	North-East
Maha Rat	มหาราช	Phra Nakhon Si Ayutthaya	พระนครศรีอยุธยา	Centre
Mai Kaen	ไม้แก่น	Pattani	ปัตตานี	South
Makham	มะขาม	Chanthaburi	จันทบุรี	East
Manang	มะนัง	Satun	สตูล	South
Mancha Khiri	มัญจาคีรี	Khon Kaen	ขอนแก่น	North-East
Manorom	มโนรมย์	Chai Nat	ชัยนาท	Centre
Mayo	มายอ	Pattani	ปัตตานี	South
Moei Wadi	เมยวดี	Roi Et	ร้อยเอ็ด	North-East
Muak Lek	มวกเหล็ก	Saraburi	สระบุรี	Centre
Muang Sam Sip	ม่วงสามสิบ	Ubon Ratchathani	อุบลราชธานี	North-East
Mueang Amnat Charoen	เมืองอำนาจเจริญ	Amnat Charoen	อำนาจเจริญ	North-East
Mueang Ang Thong	เมืองอ่างทอง	Ang Thong	อ่างทอง	Centre
Mueang Bueng Kan	เมืองบึงกาฬ	Bueng Kan	บึงกาฬ	North-East
Mueang Buriram	เมืองบุรีรัมย์	Buriram	บุรีรัมย์	North-East
Mueang Chachoengsao	เมืองฉะเชิงเทรา	Chachoengsao	ฉะเชิงเทรา	East
Mueang Chai Nat	เมืองชัยนาท	Chai Nat	ชัยนาท	Centre
Mueang Chaiyaphum	เมืองชัยภูมิ	Chaiyaphum	ชัยภูมิ	North-East
Mueang Chan	เมืองจันทร์	Sisaket	ศรีสะเกษ	North-East
Mueang Chanthaburi	เมืองจันทบุรี	Chanthaburi	จันทบุรี	East
Mueang Chiang Mai	เมืองเชียงใหม่	Chiang Mai	เชียงใหม่	North
Mueang Chiang Rai	เมืองเชียงราย	Chiang Rai	เชียงราย	North
Mueang Chonburi	เมืองชลบุรี	Chonburi	ชลบุรี	East
Mueang Chumphon	เมืองชุมพร	Chumphon	ชุมพร	South
Mueang Kalasin	เมืองกาฬสินธุ์	Kalasin	กาฬสินธุ์	North-East
Mueang Kamphaeng Phet	เมืองกำแพงเพชร	Kamphaeng Phet	กำแพงเพชร	Centre
Mueang Kanchanaburi	เมืองกาญจนบุรี	Kanchanaburi	กาญจนบุรี	West
Mueang Khon Kaen	เมืองขอนแก่น	Khon Kaen	ขอนแก่น	North-East
Mueang Krabi	เมืองกระบี่	Krabi	กระบี่	South
Mueang Lampang	เมืองลำปาง	Lampang	ลำปาง	North
Mueang Lamphun	เมืองลำพูน	Lamphun	ลำพูน	North
Mueang Loei	เมืองเลย	Loei	เลย	North-East
Mueang Lopburi	เมืองลพบุรี	Lopburi	ลพบุรี	Centre
Mueang Mae Hong Son	เมืองแม่ฮ่องสอน	Mae Hong Son	แม่ฮ่องสอน	North
Mueang Maha Sarakham	เมืองมหาสารคาม	Maha Sarakham	มหาสารคาม	North-East
Mueang Mukdahan	เมืองมุกดาหาร	Mukdahan	มุกดาหาร	North-East
Mueang Nakhon Nayok	เมืองนครนายก	Nakhon Nayok	นครนายก	Centre
Mueang Nakhon Pathom	เมืองนครปฐม	Nakhon Pathom	นครปฐม	Centre
Mueang Nakhon Phanom	เมืองนครพนม	Nakhon Phanom	นครพนม	North-East
Mueang Nakhon Ratchasima	เมืองนครราชสีมา	Nakhon Ratchasima	นครราชสีมา	North-East
Mueang Nakhon Sawan	เมืองนครสวรรค์	Nakhon Sawan	นครสวรรค์	Centre
Mueang Nakhon Si Thammarat	เมืองนครศรีธรรมราช	Nakhon Si Thammarat	นครศรีธรรมราช	South
Mueang Nan	เมืองน่าน	Nan	น่าน	North
Mueang Narathiwat	เมืองนราธิวาส	Narathiwat	นราธิวาส	South
Mueang Nong Khai	เมืองหนองคาย	Nong Khai	หนองคาย	North-East
Mueang Nongbua Lamphu	เมืองหนองบัวลำภู	Nong Bua Lamphu	หนองบัวลำภู	North-East
Mueang Nonthaburi	เมืองนนทบุรี	Nonthaburi	นนทบุรี	Centre
Mueang Pan	เมืองปาน	Lampang	ลำปาง	North
Mueang Pathum Thani	เมืองปทุมธานี	Pathum Thani	ปทุมธานี	Centre
Mueang Pattani	เมืองปัตตานี	Pattani	ปัตตานี	South
Mueang Phang Nga	เมืองพังงา	Phang Nga	พังงา	South
Mueang Phatthalung	เมืองพัทลุง	Phatthalung	พัทลุง	South
Mueang Phayao	เมืองพะเยา	Phayao	พะเยา	North
Mueang Phetchabun	เมืองเพชรบูรณ์	Phetchabun	เพชรบูรณ์	Centre
Mueang Phetchaburi	เมืองเพชรบุรี	Phetchaburi	เพชรบุรี	West
Mueang Phichit	เมืองพิจิตร	Phichit	พิจิตร	Centre
Mueang Phitsanulok	เมืองพิษณุโลก	Phitsanulok	พิษณุโลก	Centre
Mueang Phrae	เมืองแพร่	Phrae	แพร่	North
Mueang Phuket	เมืองภูเก็ต	Phuket	ภูเก็ต	South
Mueang Prachinburi	เมืองปราจีนบุรี	Prachinburi	ปราจีนบุรี	East
Mueang Prachuap Khiri Khan	เมืองประจวบคีรีขันธ์	Prachuap Khiri Khan	ประจวบคีรีขันธ์	West
Mueang Ranong	เมืองระนอง	Ranong	ระนอง	South
Mueang Ratchaburi	เมืองราชบุรี	Ratchaburi	ราชบุรี	West
Mueang Rayong	เมืองระยอง	Rayong	ระยอง	East
Mueang Roi Et	เมืองร้อยเอ็ด	Roi Et	ร้อยเอ็ด	North-East
Mueang Sa Kaeo	เมืองสระแก้ว	Sa Kaeo	สระแก้ว	East
Mueang Sakon Nakhon	เมืองสกลนคร	Sakon Nakhon	สกลนคร	North-East
Mueang Samut Prakan	เมืองสมุทรปราการ	Samut Prakan	สมุทรปราการ	Centre
Mueang Samut Sakhon	เมืองสมุทรสาคร	Samut Sakhon	สมุทรสาคร	Centre
Mueang Samut Songkhram	เมืองสมุทรสงคราม	Samut Songkhram	สมุทรสงคราม	Centre
Mueang Saraburi	เมืองสระบุรี	Saraburi	สระบุรี	Centre
Mueang Satun	เมืองสตูล	Satun	สตูล	South
Mueang Sing Buri	เมืองสิงห์บุรี	Sing Buri	สิงห์บุรี	Centre
Mueang Sisaket	เมืองศรีสะเกษ	Sisaket	ศรีสะเกษ	North-East
Mueang Songkhla	เมืองสงขลา	Songkhla	สงขลา	South
Mueang Suang	เมืองสรวง	Roi Et	ร้อยเอ็ด	North-East
Mueang Sukhothai	เมืองสุโขทัย	Sukhothai	สุโขทัย	Centre
Mueang Suphanburi	เมืองสุพรรณบุรี	Suphan Buri	สุพรรณบุรี	Centre
Mueang Surat Thani	เมืองสุราษฎร์ธานี	Surat Thani	สุราษฎร์ธานี	South
Mueang Surin	เมืองสุรินทร์	Surin	สุรินทร์	North-East
Mueang Tak	เมืองตาก	Tak	ตาก	West
Mueang Trang	เมืองตรัง	Trang	ตรัง	South
Mueang Trat	เมืองตราด	Trat	ตราด	East
Mueang Ubon Ratchathani	เมืองอุบลราชธานี	Ubon Ratchathani	อุบลราชธานี	North-East
Mueang Udon Thani	เมืองอุดรธานี	Udon Thani	อุดรธานี	North-East
Mueang Uthai Thani	เมืองอุทัยธานี	Uthai Thani	อุทัยธานี	Centre
Mueang Uttaradit	เมืองอุตรดิตถ์	Uttaradit	อุตรดิตถ์	North
Mueang Yala	เมืองยะลา	Yala	ยะลา	South
Mueang Yang	เมืองยาง	Nakhon Ratchasima	นครราชสีมา	North-East
Mueang Yasothon	เมืองยโสธร	Yasothon	ยโสธร	North-East
Na Bon	นาบอน	Nakhon Si Thammarat	นครศรีธรรมราช	South
Na Chaluai	นาจะหลวย	Ubon Ratchathani	อุบลราชธานี	North-East
Na Chueak	นาเชือก	Maha Sarakham	มหาสารคาม	North-East
Na Di	นาดี	Prachinburi	ปราจีนบุรี	East
Na Duang	นาด้วง	Loei	เลย	North-East
Na Dun	นาดูน	Maha Sarakham	มหาสารคาม	North-East
Na Haeo	นาแห้ว	Loei	เลย	North-East
Na Kae	นาแก	Nakhon Phanom	นครพนม	North-East
Na Khu	นาคู	Kalasin	กาฬสินธุ์	North-East
Na Klang	นากลาง	Nong Bua Lamphu	หนองบัวลำภู	North-East
Na Mom	นาหม่อม	Songkhla	สงขลา	South
Na Mon	นามน	Kalasin	กาฬสินธุ์	North-East
Na Muen	นาหมื่น	Nan	น่าน	North
Na Noi	นาน้อย	Nan	น่าน	North
Na Pho	นาโพธิ์	Buriram	บุรีรัมย์	North-East
Na Tan	นาตาล	Ubon Ratchathani	อุบลราชธานี	North-East
Na Thawi	นาทวี	Songkhla	สงขลา	South
Na Thom	นาทม	Nakhon Phanom	นครพนม	North-East
Na Wa	นาหว้า	Nakhon Phanom	นครพนม	North-East
Na Wang	นาวัง	Nong Bua Lamphu	หนองบัวลำภู	North-East
Na Yai Am	นายายอาม	Chanthaburi	จันทบุรี	East
Na Yia	นาเยีย	Ubon Ratchathani	อุบลราชธานี	North-East
Na Yong	นาโยง	Trang	ตรัง	South
Na Yung	นายูง	Udon Thani	อุดรธานี	North-East
Nakhon Chai Si	นครชัยศรี	Nakhon Pathom	นครปฐม	Centre
Nakhon Luang	นครหลวง	Phra Nakhon Si Ayutthaya	พระนครศรีอยุธยา	Centre
Nakhon Thai	นครไทย	Phitsanulok	พิษณุโลก	Centre
Nam Khun	น้ำขุ่น	Ubon Ratchathani	อุบลราชธานี	North-East
Nam Kliang	น้ำเกลี้ยง	Sisaket	ศรีสะเกษ	North-East
Nam Nao	น้ำหนาว	Phetchabun	เพชรบูรณ์	Centre
Nam Pat	น้ำปาด	Uttaradit	อุตรดิตถ์	North
Nam Phong	น้ำพอง	Khon Kaen	ขอนแก่น	North-East
Nam Som	น้ำโสม	Udon Thani	อุดรธานี	North-East
Nam Yuen	น้ำยืน	Ubon Ratchathani	อุบลราชธานี	North-East
Nang Rong	นางรอง	Buriram	บุรีรัมย์	North-East
Ngao	งาว	Lampang	ลำปาง	North
Nikhom Kham Soi	นิคมคำสร้อย	Mukdahan	มุกดาหาร	North-East
Nikhom Nam Un	นิคมน้ำอูน	Sakon Nakhon	สกลนคร	North-East
Nikhom Phatthana	นิคมพัฒนา	Rayong	ระยอง	East
Noen Kham	เนินขาม	Chai Nat	ชัยนาท	Centre
Noen Maprang	เนินมะปราง	Phitsanulok	พิษณุโลก	Centre
Noen Sa-nga	เนินสง่า	Chaiyaphum	ชัยภูมิ	North-East
Non Daeng	โนนแดง	Nakhon Ratchasima	นครราชสีมา	North-East
Non Din Daeng	โนนดินแดง	Buriram	บุรีรัมย์	North-East
Non Khun	โนนคูณ	Sisaket	ศรีสะเกษ	North-East
Non Narai	โนนนารายณ์	Surin	สุรินทร์	North-East
Non Sa-at	โนนสะอาด	Udon Thani	อุดรธานี	North-East
Non Sang	โนนสัง	Nong Bua Lamphu	หนองบัวลำภู	North-East
Non Sila	โนนศิลา	Khon Kaen	ขอนแก่น	North-East
Non Sung	โนนสูง	Nakhon Ratchasima	นครราชสีมา	North-East
Non Suwan	โนนสุวรรณ	Buriram	บุรีรัมย์	North-East
Non Thai	โนนไทย	Nakhon Ratchasima	นครราชสีมา	North-East
Nong Bua	หนองบัว	Nakhon Sawan	นครสวรรค์	Centre
Nong Bua Daeng	หนองบัวแดง	Chaiyaphum	ชัยภูมิ	North-East
Nong Bua Rawe	หนองบัวระเหว	Chaiyaphum	ชัยภูมิ	North-East
Nong Bun Mak	หนองบุญมาก	Nakhon Ratchasima	นครราชสีมา	North-East
Nong Chang	หนองฉาง	Uthai Thani	อุทัยธานี	Centre
Nong Chik	หนองจิก	Pattani	ปัตตานี	South
Nong Don	หนองโดน	Saraburi	สระบุรี	Centre
Nong Han	หนองหาน	Udon Thani	อุดรธานี	North-East
Nong Hi	หนองฮี	Roi Et	ร้อยเอ็ด	North-East
Nong Hin	หนองหิน	Loei	เลย	North-East
Nong Hong	หนองหงส์	Buriram	บุรีรัมย์	North-East
Nong Khae	หนองแค	Saraburi	สระบุรี	Centre
Nong Khayang	หนองขาหย่าง	Uthai Thani	อุทัยธานี	Centre
Nong Ki	หนองกี่	Buriram	บุรีรัมย์	North-East
Nong Kung Si	หนองกุงศรี	Kalasin	กาฬสินธุ์	North-East
Nong Mamong	หนองมะโมง	Chai Nat	ชัยนาท	Centre
Nong Muang	หนองม่วง	Lopburi	ลพบุรี	Centre
Nong Muang Khai	หนองม่วงไข่	Phrae	แพร่	North
Nong Na Kham	หนองนาคำ	Khon Kaen	ขอนแก่น	North-East
Nong Phai	หนองไผ่	Phetchabun	เพชรบูรณ์	Centre
Nong Phok	หนองพอก	Roi Et	ร้อยเอ็ด	North-East
Nong Prue	หนองปรือ	Kanchanaburi	กาญจนบุรี	West
Nong Ruea	หนองเรือ	Khon Kaen	ขอนแก่น	North-East
Nong Saeng	หนองแสง	Udon Thani	อุดรธานี	North-East
Nong Saeng	หนองแซง	Saraburi	สระบุรี	Centre
Nong Song Hong	หนองสองห้อง	Khon Kaen	ขอนแก่น	North-East
Nong Suea	หนองเสือ	Pathum Thani	ปทุมธานี	Centre
Nong Sung	หนองสูง	Mukdahan	มุกดาหาร	North-East
Nong Wua So	หนองวัวซอ	Udon Thani	อุดรธานี	North-East
Nong Ya Plong	หนองหญ้าปล้อง	Phetchaburi	เพชรบุรี	West
Nong Ya Sai	หนองหญ้าไซ	Suphan Buri	สุพรรณบุรี	Centre
Nong Yai	หนองใหญ่	Chonburi	ชลบุรี	East
Nopphitam	นบพิตำ	Nakhon Si Thammarat	นครศรีธรรมราช	South
Nuea Khlong	เหนือคลอง	Krabi	กระบี่	South
Omkoi	อมก๋อย	Chiang Mai	เชียงใหม่	North
Ongkharak	องครักษ์	Nakhon Nayok	นครนายก	Centre
Pa Bon	ป่าบอน	Phatthalung	พัทลุง	South
Pa Daet	ป่าแดด	Chiang Rai	เชียงราย	North
Pa Mok	ป่าโมก	Ang Thong	อ่างทอง	Centre
Pa Phayom	ป่าพะยอม	Phatthalung	พัทลุง	South
Pa Sang	ป่าซาง	Lamphun	ลำพูน	North
Pa Tio	ป่าติ้ว	Yasothon	ยโสธร	North-East
Pai	ปาย	Mae Hong Son	แม่ฮ่องสอน	North
Pak Chom	ปากชม	Loei	เลย	North-East
Pak Chong	ปากช่อง	Nakhon Ratchasima	นครราชสีมา	North-East
Pak Khat	ปากคาด	Bueng Kan	บึงกาฬ	North-East
Pak Kret	ปากเกร็ด	Nonthaburi	นนทบุรี	Centre
Pak Phanang	ปากพนัง	Nakhon Si Thammarat	นครศรีธรรมราช	South
Pak Phayun	ปากพะยูน	Phatthalung	พัทลุง	South
Pak Phli	ปากพลี	Nakhon Nayok	นครนายก	Centre
Pak Tho	ปากท่อ	Ratchaburi	ราชบุรี	West
Pak Thong Chai	ปักธงชัย	Nakhon Ratchasima	นครราชสีมา	North-East
Pakham	ปะคำ	Buriram	บุรีรัมย์	North-East
Palian	ปะเหลียน	Trang	ตรัง	South
Panare	ปะนาเระ	Pattani	ปัตตานี	South
Pang Mapha	ปางมะผ้า	Mae Hong Son	แม่ฮ่องสอน	North
Pang Sila Thong	ปางศิลาทอง	Kamphaeng Phet	กำแพงเพชร	Centre
Pathio	ปะทิว	Chumphon	ชุมพร	South
Pathum Rat	ปทุมรัตต์	Roi Et	ร้อยเอ็ด	North-East
Pathum Ratchawongsa	ปทุมราชวงศา	Amnat Charoen	อำนาจเจริญ	North-East
Pha Khao	ผาขาว	Loei	เลย	North-East
Phachi	ภาชี	Phra Nakhon Si Ayutthaya	พระนครศรีอยุธยา	Centre
Phaisali	ไพศาลี	Nakhon Sawan	นครสวรรค์	Centre
Phak Hai	ผักไห่	Phra Nakhon Si Ayutthaya	พระนครศรีอยุธยา	Centre
Phakdi Chumphon	ภักดีชุมพล	Chaiyaphum	ชัยภูมิ	North-East
Phan	พาน	Chiang Rai	เชียงราย	North
Phan Thong	พานทอง	Chonburi	ชลบุรี	East
Phana	พนา	Amnat Charoen	อำนาจเจริญ	North-East
Phanat Nikhom	พนัสนิคม	Chonburi	ชลบุรี	East
Phang Khon	พังโคน	Sakon Nakhon	สกลนคร	North-East
Phanna Nikhom	พรรณนานิคม	Sakon Nakhon	สกลนคร	North-East
Phanom	พนม	Surat Thani	สุราษฎร์ธานี	South
Phanom Dong Rak	พนมดงรัก	Surin	สุรินทร์	North-East
Phanom Phrai	พนมไพร	Roi Et	ร้อยเอ็ด	North-East
Phanom Sarakham	พนมสารคาม	Chachoengsao	ฉะเชิงเทรา	East
Phanom Thuan	พนมทวน	Kanchanaburi	กาญจนบุรี	West
Phato	พะโต๊ะ	Chumphon	ชุมพร	South
Phatthana Nikhom	พัฒนานิคม	Lopburi	ลพบุรี	Centre
Phaya Mengrai	พญาเม็งราย	Chiang Rai	เชียงราย	North
Phayakkhaphum Phisai	พยัคฆภูมิพิสัย	Maha Sarakham	มหาสารคาม	North-East
Phayu	พยุห์	Sisaket	ศรีสะเกษ	North-East
Phayuha Khiri	พยุหะคีรี	Nakhon Sawan	นครสวรรค์	Centre
Phen	เพ็ญ	Udon Thani	อุดรธานี	North-East
Phibun Mangsahan	พิบูลมังสาหาร	Ubon Ratchathani	อุบลราชธานี	North-East
Phibun Rak	พิบูลย์รักษ์	Udon Thani	อุดรธานี	North-East
Phichai	พิชัย	Uttaradit	อุตรดิตถ์	North
Phimai	พิมาย	Nakhon Ratchasima	นครราชสีมา	North-East
Phipun	พิปูน	Nakhon Si Thammarat	นครศรีธรรมราช	South
Phlapphla Chai	พลับพลาชัย	Buriram	บุรีรัมย์	North-East
Pho Chai	โพธิ์ชัย	Roi Et	ร้อยเอ็ด	North-East
Pho Prathap Chang	โพธิ์ประทับช้าง	Phichit	พิจิตร	Centre
Pho Sai	โพธิ์ไทร	Ubon Ratchathani	อุบลราชธานี	North-East
Pho Si Suwan	โพธิ์ศรีสุวรรณ	Sisaket	ศรีสะเกษ	North-East
Pho Tak	โพธิ์ตาก	Nong Khai	หนองคาย	North-East
Pho Thale	โพทะเล	Phichit	พิจิตร	Centre
Pho Thong	โพธิ์ทอง	Ang Thong	อ่างทอง	Centre
Phon	พล	Khon Kaen	ขอนแก่น	North-East
Phon Charoen	พรเจริญ	Bueng Kan	บึงกาฬ	North-East
Phon Na Kaeo	โพนนาแก้ว	Sakon Nakhon	สกลนคร	North-East
Phon Phisai	โพนพิสัย	Nong Khai	หนองคาย	North-East
Phon Sai	โพนทราย	Roi Et	ร้อยเอ็ด	North-East
Phon Sawan	โพนสวรรค์	Nakhon Phanom	นครพนม	North-East
Phon Thong	โพนทอง	Roi Et	ร้อยเอ็ด	North-East
Phop Phra	พบพระ	Tak	ตาก	West
Photharam	โพธาราม	Ratchaburi	ราชบุรี	West
Phra Nakhon Si Ayutthaya	พระนครศรีอยุธยา	Phra Nakhon Si Ayutthaya	พระนครศรีอยุธยา	Centre
Phra Phrom	พระพรหม	Nakhon Si Thammarat	นครศรีธรรมราช	South
Phra Phutthabat	พระพุทธบาท	Saraburi	สระบุรี	Centre
Phra Pradaeng	พระประแดง	Samut Prakan	สมุทรปราการ	Centre
Phra Samut Chedi	พระสมุทรเจดีย์	Samut Prakan	สมุทรปราการ	Centre
Phra Thong Kham	พระทองคำ	Nakhon Ratchasima	นครราชสีมา	North-East
Phra Yuen	พระยืน	Khon Kaen	ขอนแก่น	North-East
Phrai Bueng	ไพรบึง	Sisaket	ศรีสะเกษ	North-East
Phran Kratai	พรานกระต่าย	Kamphaeng Phet	กำแพงเพชร	Centre
Phrao	พร้าว	Chiang Mai	เชียงใหม่	North
Phrasaeng	พระแสง	Surat Thani	สุราษฎร์ธานี	South
Phrom Buri	พรหมบุรี	Sing Buri	สิงห์บุรี	Centre
Phrom Khiri	พรหมคีรี	Nakhon Si Thammarat	นครศรีธรรมราช	South
Phrom Phiram	พรหมพิราม	Phitsanulok	พิษณุโลก	Centre
Phu Kamyao	ภูกามยาว	Phayao	พะเยา	North
Phu Khiao	ภูเขียว	Chaiyaphum	ชัยภูมิ	North-East
Phu Kradueng	ภูกระดึง	Loei	เลย	North-East
Phu Luang	ภูหลวง	Loei	เลย	North-East
Phu Pha Man	ภูผาม่าน	Khon Kaen	ขอนแก่น	North-East
Phu Phan	ภูพาน	Sakon Nakhon	สกลนคร	North-East
Phu Phiang	ภูเพียง	Nan	น่าน	North
Phu Ruea	ภูเรือ	Loei	เลย	North-East
Phu Sang	ภูซาง	Phayao	พะเยา	North
Phu Sing	ภูสิงห์	Sisaket	ศรีสะเกษ	North-East
Phu Wiang	ภูเวียง	Khon Kaen	ขอนแก่น	North-East
Phunphin	พุนพิน	Surat Thani	สุราษฎร์ธานี	South
Phutthaisong	พุทไธสง	Buriram	บุรีรัมย์	North-East
Phutthamonthon	พุทธมณฑล	Nakhon Pathom	นครปฐม	Centre
Pla Pak	ปลาปาก	Nakhon Phanom	นครพนม	North-East
Plaeng Yao	แปลงยาว	Chachoengsao	ฉะเชิงเทรา	East
Plai Phraya	ปลายพระยา	Krabi	กระบี่	South
Pluak Daeng	ปลวกแดง	Rayong	ระยอง	East
Pong	ปง	Phayao	พะเยา	North
Pong Nam Ron	โป่งน้ำร้อน	Chanthaburi	จันทบุรี	East
Prachaksinlapakhom	ประจักษ์ศิลปาคม	Udon Thani	อุดรธานี	North-East
Prachantakham	ประจันตคาม	Prachinburi	ปราจีนบุรี	East
Prakhon Chai	ประโคนชัย	Buriram	บุรีรัมย์	North-East
Pran Buri	ปราณบุรี	Prachuap Khiri Khan	ประจวบคีรีขันธ์	West
Prang Ku	ปรางค์กู่	Sisaket	ศรีสะเกษ	North-East
Prasat	ปราสาท	Surin	สุรินทร์	North-East
Prathai	ประทาย	Nakhon Ratchasima	นครราชสีมา	North-East
Pua	ปัว	Nan	น่าน	North
Pueai Noi	เปือยน้อย	Khon Kaen	ขอนแก่น	North-East
Ra-ngae	ระแงะ	Narathiwat	นราธิวาส	South
Raman	รามัน	Yala	ยะลา	South
Ranot	ระโนด	Songkhla	สงขลา	South
Rasi Salai	ราษีไศล	Sisaket	ศรีสะเกษ	North-East
Ratchasan	ราชสาส์น	Chachoengsao	ฉะเชิงเทรา	East
Ratsada	รัษฎา	Trang	ตรัง	South
Rattanaburi	รัตนบุรี	Surin	สุรินทร์	North-East
Rattanawapi	รัตนวาปี	Nong Khai	หนองคาย	North-East
Rattaphum	รัตภูมิ	Songkhla	สงขลา	South
Renu Nakhon	เรณูนคร	Nakhon Phanom	นครพนม	North-East
Ron Phibun	ร่อนพิบูลย์	Nakhon Si Thammarat	นครศรีธรรมราช	South
Rong Kham	ร่องคำ	Kalasin	กาฬสินธุ์	North-East
Rong Kwang	ร้องกวาง	Phrae	แพร่	North
Rueso	รือเสาะ	Narathiwat	นราธิวาส	South
Sa Bot	สระโบสถ์	Lopburi	ลพบุรี	Centre
Saba Yoi	สะบ้าย้อย	Songkhla	สงขลา	South
Sadao	สะเดา	Songkhla	สงขลา	South
Sahatsakhan	สหัสขันธ์	Kalasin	กาฬสินธุ์	North-East
Sai Buri	สายบุรี	Pattani	ปัตตานี	South
Sai Mun	ทรายมูล	Yasothon	ยโสธร	North-East
Sai Ngam	ไทรงาม	Kamphaeng Phet	กำแพงเพชร	Centre
Sai Noi	ไทรน้อย	Nonthaburi	นนทบุรี	Centre
Sai Thong Watthana	ทรายทองวัฒนา	Kamphaeng Phet	กำแพงเพชร	Centre
Sai Yok	ไทรโยค	Kanchanaburi	กาญจนบุรี	West
Sak Lek	สากเหล็ก	Phichit	พิจิตร	Centre
Sakhrai	สระใคร	Nong Khai	หนองคาย	North-East
Sam Chai	สามชัย	Kalasin	กาฬสินธุ์	North-East
Sam Chuk	สามชุก	Suphan Buri	สุพรรณบุรี	Centre
Sam Khok	สามโคก	Pathum Thani	ปทุมธานี	Centre
Sam Ngam	สามง่าม	Phichit	พิจิตร	Centre
Sam Ngao	สามเงา	Tak	ตาก	West
Sam Phran	สามพราน	Nakhon Pathom	นครปฐม	Centre
Sam Roi Yot	สามร้อยยอด	Prachuap Khiri Khan	ประจวบคีรีขันธ์	West
Sam Sung	ซำสูง	Khon Kaen	ขอนแก่น	North-East
Samko	สามโก้	Ang Thong	อ่างทอง	Centre
Samoeng	สะเมิง	Chiang Mai	เชียงใหม่	North
Samrong	สำโรง	Ubon Ratchathani	อุบลราชธานี	North-East
Samrong Thap	สำโรงทาบ	Surin	สุรินทร์	North-East
San Kamphaeng	สันกำแพง	Chiang Mai	เชียงใหม่	North
San Pa Tong	สันป่าตอง	Chiang Mai	เชียงใหม่	North
San Sai	สันทราย	Chiang Mai	เชียงใหม่	North
Sanam Chai Khet	สนามชัยเขต	Chachoengsao	ฉะเชิงเทรา	East
Sang Khom	สร้างคอม	Udon Thani	อุดรธานี	North-East
Sangkha	สังขะ	Surin	สุรินทร์	North-East
Sangkhla Buri	สังขละบุรี	Kanchanaburi	กาญจนบุรี	West
Sangkhom	สังคม	Nong Khai	หนองคาย	North-East
Sankhaburi	สรรคบุรี	Chai Nat	ชัยนาท	Centre
Sanom	สนม	Surin	สุรินทร์	North-East
Santi Suk	สันติสุข	Nan	น่าน	North
Sao Hai	เสาไห้	Saraburi	สระบุรี	Centre
Sap Yai	ซับใหญ่	Chaiyaphum	ชัยภูมิ	North-East
Sapphaya	สรรพยา	Chai Nat	ชัยนาท	Centre
Saraphi	สารภี	Chiang Mai	เชียงใหม่	North
Sathing Phra	สทิงพระ	Songkhla	สงขลา	South
Sattahip	สัตหีบ	Chonburi	ชลบุรี	East
Satuek	สตึก	Buriram	บุรีรัมย์	North-East
Sawaeng Ha	แสวงหา	Ang Thong	อ่างทอง	Centre
Sawang Arom	สว่างอารมณ์	Uthai Thani	อุทัยธานี	Centre
Sawang Daen Din	สว่างแดนดิน	Sakon Nakhon	สกลนคร	North-East
Sawang Wirawong	สว่างวีระวงศ์	Ubon Ratchathani	อุบลราชธานี	North-East
Sawankhalok	สวรรคโลก	Sukhothai	สุโขทัย	Centre
Sawi	สวี	Chumphon	ชุมพร	South
Seka	เซกา	Bueng Kan	บึงกาฬ	North-East
Selaphum	เสลภูมิ	Roi Et	ร้อยเอ็ด	North-East
Sena	เสนา	Phra Nakhon Si Ayutthaya	พระนครศรีอยุธยา	Centre
Senangkhanikhom	เสนางคนิคม	Amnat Charoen	อำนาจเจริญ	North-East
Si Banphot	ศรีบรรพต	Phatthalung	พัทลุง	South
Si Bun Rueang	ศรีบุญเรือง	Nong Bua Lamphu	หนองบัวลำภู	North-East
Si Chiang Mai	ศรีเชียงใหม่	Nong Khai	หนองคาย	North-East
Si Chomphu	สีชมพู	Khon Kaen	ขอนแก่น	North-East
Si Maha Phot	ศรีมหาโพธิ	Prachinburi	ปราจีนบุรี	East
Si Mahosot	ศรีมโหสถ	Prachinburi	ปราจีนบุรี	East
Si Mueang Mai	ศรีเมืองใหม่	Ubon Ratchathani	อุบลราชธานี	North-East
Si Nakhon	ศรีนคร	Sukhothai	สุโขทัย	Centre
Si Narong	ศรีณรงค์	Surin	สุรินทร์	North-East
Si Prachan	ศรีประจันต์	Suphan Buri	สุพรรณบุรี	Centre
Si Racha	ศรีราชา	Chonburi	ชลบุรี	East
Si Rattana	ศรีรัตนะ	Sisaket	ศรีสะเกษ	North-East
Si Sakhon	ศรีสาคร	Narathiwat	นราธิวาส	South
Si Samrong	ศรีสำโรง	Sukhothai	สุโขทัย	Centre
Si Satchanalai	ศรีสัชนาลัย	Sukhothai	สุโขทัย	Centre
Si Sawat	ศรีสวัสดิ์	Kanchanaburi	กาญจนบุรี	West
Si Somdet	ศรีสมเด็จ	Roi Et	ร้อยเอ็ด	North-East
Si Songkhram	ศรีสงคราม	Nakhon Phanom	นครพนม	North-East
Si That	ศรีธาตุ	Udon Thani	อุดรธานี	North-East
Si Thep	ศรีเทพ	Phetchabun	เพชรบูรณ์	Centre
Si Wilai	ศรีวิไล	Bueng Kan	บึงกาฬ	North-East
Sichon	สิชล	Nakhon Si Thammarat	นครศรีธรรมราช	South
Sida	สีดา	Nakhon Ratchasima	นครราชสีมา	North-East
Sikao	สิเกา	Trang	ตรัง	South
Sikhio	สีคิ้ว	Nakhon Ratchasima	นครราชสีมา	North-East
Sikhoraphum	ศีขรภูมิ	Surin	สุรินทร์	North-East
Sila Lat	ศิลาลาด	Sisaket	ศรีสะเกษ	North-East
Singhanakhon	สิงหนคร	Songkhla	สงขลา	South
Sirindhorn	สิรินธร	Ubon Ratchathani	อุบลราชธานี	North-East
So Phisai	โซ่พิสัย	Bueng Kan	บึงกาฬ	North-East
Soem Ngam	เสริมงาม	Lampang	ลำปาง	North
Soeng Sang	เสิงสาง	Nakhon Ratchasima	นครราชสีมา	North-East
Soi Dao	สอยดาว	Chanthaburi	จันทบุรี	East
Somdet	สมเด็จ	Kalasin	กาฬสินธุ์	North-East
Song	สอง	Phrae	แพร่	North
Song Dao	ส่องดาว	Sakon Nakhon	สกลนคร	North-East
Song Khwae	สองแคว	Nan	น่าน	North
Song Phi Nong	สองพี่น้อง	Suphan Buri	สุพรรณบุรี	Centre
Sop Moei	สบเมย	Mae Hong Son	แม่ฮ่องสอน	North
Sop Prap	สบปราบ	Lampang	ลำปาง	North
Srinagarindra	ศรีนครินทร์	Phatthalung	พัทลุง	South
Su-ngai Kolok	สุไหงโก-ลก	Narathiwat	นราธิวาส	South
Su-ngai Padi	สุไหงปาดี	Narathiwat	นราธิวาส	South
Suan Phueng	สวนผึ้ง	Ratchaburi	ราชบุรี	West
Suk Samran	สุขสำราญ	Ranong	ระนอง	South
Sukhirin	สุคิริน	Narathiwat	นราธิวาส	South
Sung Men	สูงเม่น	Phrae	แพร่	North
Sung Noen	สูงเนิน	Nakhon Ratchasima	นครราชสีมา	North-East
Suwannakhuha	สุวรรณคูหา	Nong Bua Lamphu	หนองบัวลำภู	North-East
Suwannaphum	สุวรรณภูมิ	Roi Et	ร้อยเอ็ด	North-East
Ta Phraya	ตาพระยา	Sa Kaeo	สระแก้ว	East
Tak Bai	ตากใบ	Narathiwat	นราธิวาส	South
Tak Fa	ตากฟ้า	Nakhon Sawan	นครสวรรค์	Centre
Takhli	ตาคลี	Nakhon Sawan	นครสวรรค์	Centre
Takua Pa	ตะกั่วป่า	Phang Nga	พังงา	South
Takua Thung	ตะกั่วทุ่ง	Phang Nga	พังงา	South
Tamot	ตะโหมด	Phatthalung	พัทลุง	South
Tan Sum	ตาลสุม	Ubon Ratchathani	อุบลราชธานี	North-East
Tao Ngoi	เต่างอย	Sakon Nakhon	สกลนคร	North-East
Taphan Hin	ตะพานหิน	Phichit	พิจิตร	Centre
Tha Bo	ท่าบ่อ	Nong Khai	หนองคาย	North-East
Tha Chana	ท่าชนะ	Surat Thani	สุราษฎร์ธานี	South
Tha Chang	ท่าช้าง	Sing Buri	สิงห์บุรี	Centre
Tha Chang	ท่าฉาง	Surat Thani	สุราษฎร์ธานี	South
Tha Khantho	ท่าคันโท	Kalasin	กาฬสินธุ์	North-East
Tha Li	ท่าลี่	Loei	เลย	North-East
Tha Luang	ท่าหลวง	Lopburi	ลพบุรี	Centre
Tha Mai	ท่าใหม่	Chanthaburi	จันทบุรี	East
Tha Maka	ท่ามะกา	Kanchanaburi	กาญจนบุรี	West
Tha Muang	ท่าม่วง	Kanchanaburi	กาญจนบุรี	West
Tha Phae	ท่าแพ	Satun	สตูล	South
Tha Pla	ท่าปลา	Uttaradit	อุตรดิตถ์	North
Tha Ruea	ท่าเรือ	Phra Nakhon Si Ayutthaya	พระนครศรีอยุธยา	Centre
Tha Sae	ท่าแซะ	Chumphon	ชุมพร	South
Tha Sala	ท่าศาลา	Nakhon Si Thammarat	นครศรีธรรมราช	South
Tha Song Yang	ท่าสองยาง	Tak	ตาก	West
Tha Takiap	ท่าตะเกียบ	Chachoengsao	ฉะเชิงเทรา	East
Tha Tako	ท่าตะโก	Nakhon Sawan	นครสวรรค์	Centre
Tha Tum	ท่าตูม	Surin	สุรินทร์	North-East
Tha Uthen	ท่าอุเทน	Nakhon Phanom	นครพนม	North-East
Tha Wang Pha	ท่าวังผา	Nan	น่าน	North
Tha Wung	ท่าวุ้ง	Lopburi	ลพบุรี	Centre
Tha Yang	ท่ายาง	Phetchaburi	เพชรบุรี	West
Thai Charoen	ไทยเจริญ	Yasothon	ยโสธร	North-East
Thai Mueang	ท้ายเหมือง	Phang Nga	พังงา	South
Thalang	ถลาง	Phuket	ภูเก็ต	South
Tham Phannara	ถ้ำพรรณรา	Nakhon Si Thammarat	นครศรีธรรมราช	South
Than To	ธารโต	Yala	ยะลา	South
Thanyaburi	ธัญบุรี	Pathum Thani	ปทุมธานี	Centre
Thap Khlo	ทับคล้อ	Phichit	พิจิตร	Centre
Thap Put	ทับปุด	Phang Nga	พังงา	South
Thap Sakae	ทับสะแก	Prachuap Khiri Khan	ประจวบคีรีขันธ์	West
Thap Than	ทัพทัน	Uthai Thani	อุทัยธานี	Centre
That Phanom	ธาตุพนม	Nakhon Phanom	นครพนม	North-East
Thawat Buri	ธวัชบุรี	Roi Et	ร้อยเอ็ด	North-East
Thep Sathit	เทพสถิต	Chaiyaphum	ชัยภูมิ	North-East
Thepha	เทพา	Songkhla	สงขลา	South
Thepharak	เทพารักษ์	Nakhon Ratchasima	นครราชสีมา	North-East
Thoen	เถิน	Lampang	ลำปาง	North
Thoeng	เทิง	Chiang Rai	เชียงราย	North
Thong Pha Phum	ทองผาภูมิ	Kanchanaburi	กาญจนบุรี	West
Thong Saen Khan	ทองแสนขัน	Uttaradit	อุตรดิตถ์	North
Thung Chang	ทุ่งช้าง	Nan	น่าน	North
Thung Fon	ทุ่งฝน	Udon Thani	อุดรธานี	North-East
Thung Hua Chang	ทุ่งหัวช้าง	Lamphun	ลำพูน	North
Thung Khao Luang	ทุ่งเขาหลวง	Roi Et	ร้อยเอ็ด	North-East
Thung Saliam	ทุ่งเสลี่ยม	Sukhothai	สุโขทัย	Centre
Thung Si Udom	ทุ่งศรีอุดม	Ubon Ratchathani	อุบลราชธานี	North-East
Thung Song	ทุ่งสง	Nakhon Si Thammarat	นครศรีธรรมราช	South
Thung Tako	ทุ่งตะโก	Chumphon	ชุมพร	South
Thung Wa	ทุ่งหว้า	Satun	สตูล	South
Thung Yai	ทุ่งใหญ่	Nakhon Si Thammarat	นครศรีธรรมราช	South
Thung Yang Daeng	ทุ่งยางแดง	Pattani	ปัตตานี	South
Trakan Phuet Phon	ตระการพืชผล	Ubon Ratchathani	อุบลราชธานี	North-East
Tron	ตรอน	Uttaradit	อุตรดิตถ์	North
U Thong	อู่ทอง	Suphan Buri	สุพรรณบุรี	Centre
Ubolratana	อุบลรัตน์	Khon Kaen	ขอนแก่น	North-East
Umphang	อุ้มผาง	Tak	ตาก	West
Uthai	อุทัย	Phra Nakhon Si Ayutthaya	พระนครศรีอยุธยา	Centre
Uthumphon Phisai	อุทุมพรพิสัย	Sisaket	ศรีสะเกษ	North-East
Vibhavadi	วิภาวดี	Surat Thani	สุราษฎร์ธานี	South
Wachirabarami	วชิรบารมี	Phichit	พิจิตร	Centre
Waeng	แว้ง	Narathiwat	นราธิวาส	South
Waeng Noi	แวงน้อย	Khon Kaen	ขอนแก่น	North-East
Waeng Yai	แวงใหญ่	Khon Kaen	ขอนแก่น	North-East
Wan Yai	หว้านใหญ่	Mukdahan	มุกดาหาร	North-East
Wang Chan	วังจันทร์	Rayong	ระยอง	East
Wang Chao	วังเจ้า	Tak	ตาก	West
Wang Chin	วังชิ้น	Phrae	แพร่	North
Wang Hin	วังหิน	Sisaket	ศรีสะเกษ	North-East
Wang Muang	วังม่วง	Saraburi	สระบุรี	Centre
Wang Nam Khiao	วังน้ำเขียว	Nakhon Ratchasima	นครราชสีมา	North-East
Wang Nam Yen	วังน้ำเย็น	Sa Kaeo	สระแก้ว	East
Wang Noi	วังน้อย	Phra Nakhon Si Ayutthaya	พระนครศรีอยุธยา	Centre
Wang Nuea	วังเหนือ	Lampang	ลำปาง	North
Wang Pong	วังโป่ง	Phetchabun	เพชรบูรณ์	Centre
Wang Sai Phun	วังทรายพูน	Phichit	พิจิตร	Centre
Wang Sam Mo	วังสามหมอ	Udon Thani	อุดรธานี	North-East
Wang Saphung	วังสะพุง	Loei	เลย	North-East
Wang Sombun	วังสมบูรณ์	Sa Kaeo	สระแก้ว	East
Wang Thong	วังทอง	Phitsanulok	พิษณุโลก	Centre
Wang Wiset	วังวิเศษ	Trang	ตรัง	South
Wang Yang	วังยาง	Nakhon Phanom	นครพนม	North-East
Wanon Niwat	วานรนิวาส	Sakon Nakhon	สกลนคร	North-East
Wapi Pathum	วาปีปทุม	Maha Sarakham	มหาสารคาม	North-East
Warin Chamrap	วารินชำราบ	Ubon Ratchathani	อุบลราชธานี	North-East
Waritchaphum	วาริชภูมิ	Sakon Nakhon	สกลนคร	North-East
Wat Bot	วัดโบสถ์	Phitsanulok	พิษณุโลก	Centre
Wat Phleng	วัดเพลง	Ratchaburi	ราชบุรี	West
Wat Sing	วัดสิงห์	Chai Nat	ชัยนาท	Centre
Watthana Nakhon	วัฒนานคร	Sa Kaeo	สระแก้ว	East
Wiang Chai	เวียงชัย	Chiang Rai	เชียงราย	North
Wiang Chiang Rung	เวียงเชียงรุ้ง	Chiang Rai	เชียงราย	North
Wiang Haeng	เวียงแหง	Chiang Mai	เชียงใหม่	North
Wiang Kaen	เวียงแก่น	Chiang Rai	เชียงราย	North
Wiang Kao	เวียงเก่า	Khon Kaen	ขอนแก่น	North-East
Wiang Nong Long	เวียงหนองล่อง	Lamphun	ลำพูน	North
Wiang Pa Pao	เวียงป่าเป้า	Chiang Rai	เชียงราย	North
Wiang Sa	เวียงสา	Nan	น่าน	North
Wiang Sa	เวียงสระ	Surat Thani	สุราษฎร์ธานี	South
Wichian Buri	วิเชียรบุรี	Phetchabun	เพชรบูรณ์	Centre
Wihan Daeng	วิหารแดง	Saraburi	สระบุรี	Centre
Wiset Chai Chan	วิเศษชัยชาญ	Ang Thong	อ่างทอง	Centre
Yaha	ยะหา	Yala	ยะลา	South
Yan Ta Khao	ย่านตาขาว	Trang	ตรัง	South
Yang Chum Noi	ยางชุมน้อย	Sisaket	ศรีสะเกษ	North-East
Yang Sisurat	ยางสีสุราช	Maha Sarakham	มหาสารคาม	North-East
Yang Talat	ยางตลาด	Kalasin	กาฬสินธุ์	North-East
Yarang	ยะรัง	Pattani	ปัตตานี	South
Yaring	ยะหริ่ง	Pattani	ปัตตานี	South
Yi-ngo	ยี่งอ	Narathiwat	นราธิวาส	South

== Nomenclature: regions ==
Region	Thai name	Transcription
Central	ภาคกลาง	phak klang
Eastern	ภาคตะวันออก	phak tawan ok
Northern	ภาคเหนือ	phak nuea
North-Eastern	ภาคตะวันออกเฉียงเหนือ or ภาคอีสาน	phak tawan ok chiang nuea or phak isan
Southern	ภาคใต้	phak tai
Western	ภาคตะวันตก	phak tawan tok

== See also ==
- Administrative divisions of Thailand
- List of districts of Bangkok
- List of tambon in Thailand
- Provinces of Thailand
- List of cities in Thailand
