= Prang Ku Suan Taeng =

Khmer Hindu temple

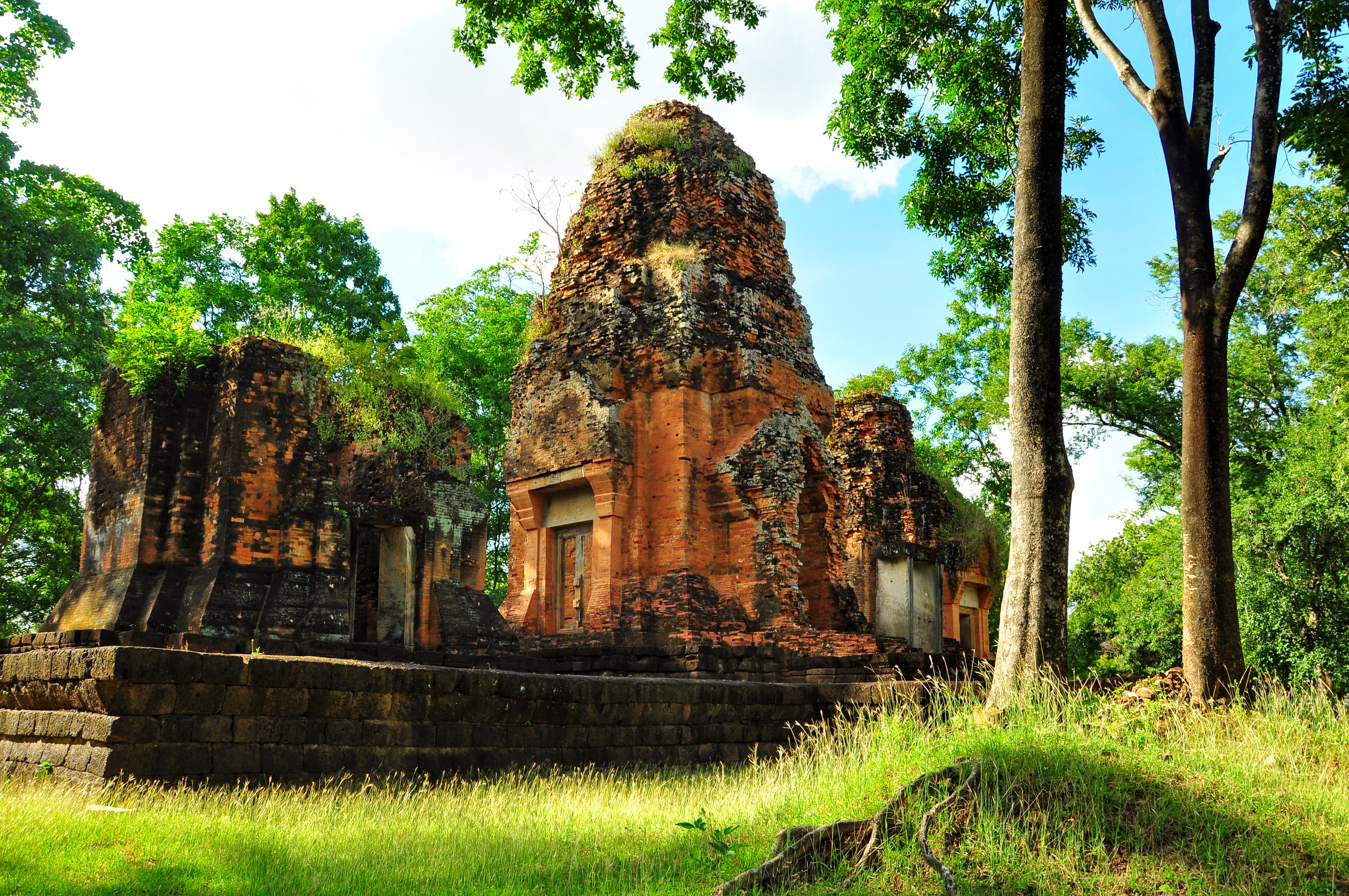

Religion
- Affiliation: Hinduism
- District: Ban Mai Chaiyaphot
- Province: Buriram

Location
- Country: Thailand
- Interactive map of Prang Ku Suan Taeng
- Coordinates: 15.554°N 102.837°E

Architecture
- Type: Khmer
- Creator: Jayavarman VII or Suryavarman II
- Completed: Second half of the 12th century

Prang Ku Suan Taeng, is an ancient Khmer Hindu temple in Ban Mai Chaiyaphot district, Buriram province, Thailand. Built during the second half of the 12th century in the Khmer architectural style, the temple is believed to have also served as a medical facility.

== Description ==
Built in the mid-12th to second half of the 12th century during the reign of Jayavarman VII or Suryavarman II in the Khmer Bayon architectural style, the temple is in Suan Laeng village on the road between Putthaisong and Prathai. Believed to have served as a Arogayasala or hospital, the temple provided medical as well as religious services.

The site consists of three towers built of brick on the same laterite base arranged in a north-south direction and facing east. The larger, central principal tower has a protruding porch at the front and three false doors on its other sides. The three towers are surrounded by a moat. To the east are the remains of two library buildings with only the laterite foundations having survived. Nearby is a baray or small pond.

== Artefacts ==
Artefacts recovered from the site include seven well-preserved, intricately carved lintels which have been placed in various museums. These include – from the north tower, a carving of Vishnu reclining (Bangkok National Museum); from the south tower, Indra on Airavata (Khon Kaen National Museum); and Vishnu as Vamanavatara, and a depiction of the churning of the ocean of milk (Phimai National Museum).
