= Nong Saeng district =

There are two amphoe (districts) named Nong Saeng in Thailand, which, however, have two different Thai spellings

- Amphoe Nong Saeng, Saraburi province (หนองแซง)
- Amphoe Nong Saeng, Udon Thani province (หนองแสง)
