= Manang district, Thailand =

Manang มะนัง
- District
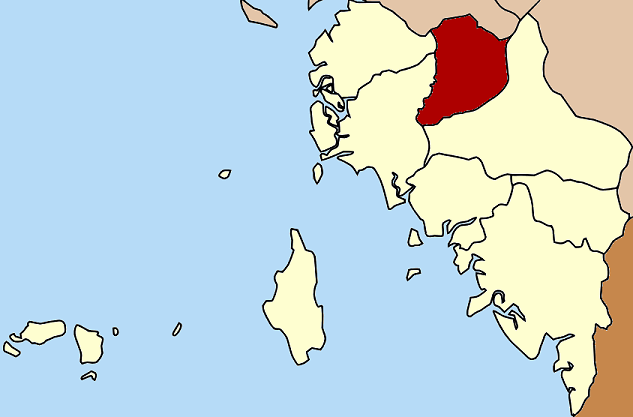
- District location in Satun province
- Coordinates: 7°0′0″N 99°55′18″E
- Country: Thailand
- Province: Satun
- Seat: Palm Phatthana

Area
  - Total: 207.8 km^{2} (80.2 sq mi)

Population (2005)
  - Total: 14,611
  - Density: 70.3/km^{2} (182/sq mi)
- Time zone: UTC+7 (ICT)
- Postal code: 91130
- Geocode: 9107

Manang (Thai: มะนัง, pronounced [mā.nāŋ]) is a district (amphoe) of Satun Province, southern Thailand.

== History ==
The district was created on 15 July 1996 by splitting two tambons from Khuan Kalong district On 15 May 2007, all 81 minor districts were upgraded to full districts. On August 24 the upgrade became official.

== Geography ==
Neighboring districts are (from the north clockwise) Palian of Trang province, Khuan Kalong, La-ngu and Thung Wa of Satun province.

== Administration ==
The district is divided into two sub-districts (tambons), which are further subdivided into 18 villages (muban). There are no municipal (thesaban) areas, and two tambon administrative organizations (TAO).

No.	Name	Thai name	Villages	Pop.
1.	Palm Phatthana	ปาล์มพัฒนา	9	8,347
2.	Nikhom Phatthana	นิคมพัฒนา	9	6,264
