= Mueang Yang district =

Mueang Yang เมืองยาง
- District
- District location in Nakhon Ratchasima province
- Coordinates: 15°25′24″N 102°54′6″E
- Country: Thailand
- Province: Nakhon Ratchasima
- Seat: Mueang Yang

Area
  - Total: 255.5 km^{2} (98.6 sq mi)

Population (2000)
  - Total: 28,501
  - Density: 111.5/km^{2} (289/sq mi)
- Time zone: UTC+7 (ICT)
- Postal code: 30270
- Geocode: 3027

Mueang Yang (Thai: เมืองยาง, pronounced [mɯ̄aŋ jāːŋ]; Northeastern Thai: เมืองยาง, pronounced [mɯ̂aŋ ɲâːŋ]) is a district (amphoe) in the northeastern part of Nakhon Ratchasima province, northeastern Thailand.

== History ==
The area now known as Mueang Yang district has been occupied since prehistoric times, as evidenced by the discovery of ceramics in Ban Mueang Yang and Ban Krabueang Nok. There are also small Khmer prasat in Ban Mueang Yang and Ban Nang O.

The area of Mueang Yang was separated from Chum Phuang district and made a minor district (king amphoe) on 1 April 1995. The people of Mueang Yang District are descendants of the original Khorat people and migrants from the neighbouring provinces of Buriram, Khon Kaen, Maha Sarakham, and Roi Et.

On 15 May 2007, all 81 minor districts were upgraded to full districts. On 24 August the upgrade became official.

== Geography ==
Neighbouring districts are (clockwise from the north): Ban Mai Chaiyaphot, Phutthaisong, and Khu Mueang of Buriram province; Lam Thamenchai, Chum Phuang, and Prathai of Nakhon Ratchasima Province.

The main water source is the Mun river.

== Administration ==
The district is divided into four subdistricts (tambons). There are no municipal (thesaban nakhon) areas in the district.

1.	Mueang Yang	เมืองยาง
2.	Krabueang Nok	กระเบื้องนอก
3.	Lahan Pla Khao	ละหานปลาค้าว
4.	Non Udom	โนนอุดม
