= Pueai Noi district =

Pueai Noi เปือยน้อย
- District
- District location in Khon Kaen province
- Coordinates: 15°52′17″N 102°54′20″E
- Country: Thailand
- Province: Khon Kaen
- Seat: Pueai Noi
- Subdistrict: 4
- Muban: 32
- District established: 1977

Area
  - Total: 173.0 km^{2} (66.8 sq mi)

Population (2010)
  - Total: 19,917
  - Density: 114.1/km^{2} (296/sq mi)
- Time zone: UTC+7 (ICT)
- Postal code: 40340
- Geocode: 4011

Pueai Noi (Thai: เปือยน้อย, pronounced [pɯ̄aj nɔ́ːj]; Northeastern Thai: เปือยน้อย, pronounced [pɯ̀aj nɔ̏ːj]) is a district (Amphoe) in the southwestern part of Khon Kaen province, northeastern Thailand.

== Geography ==
Neighboring districts are (from the south clockwise): Nong Song Hong and Ban Phai of Khon Kaen Province; and Kut Rang and Na Chueak of Maha Sarakham Province.

== History ==
The minor district (king amphoe) Phueai Noi was established on 17 January 1977, with the two tambons Phueai Noi and Wang Muang from Ban Phai district. It was upgraded to a full district on 4 July 1994.

== Administration ==
The district is divided into four subdistricts (tambons), which are further subdivided into 32 villages (mubans). Pueai Noi is a subdistrict municipality (thesaban tambon) which covers parts of tambons Phueai Noi and Sa Kaeo, and Sa Kaeo a subdistrict municipality which covers the remaining areas of the two subdistricts. There are two tambon administrative organizations (TAO), one for each of the remaining subdistricts.

No.	Name	Thai	Villages	Pop.
1.	Pueai Noi	เปือยน้อย	7	4,468
2.	Wang Muang	วังม่วง	8	6,359
3.	Kham Pom	ขามป้อม	10	5,443
4.	Sa Kaeo	สระแก้ว	7	3,647
