= Wapi Pathum district =

Wapi Pathum วาปีปทุม
- District
- District location in Maha Sarakham province
- Coordinates: 15°50′48″N 103°22′48″E
- Country: Thailand
- Province: Maha Sarakham
- Seat: Nong Saeng

Area
  - Total: 605.77 km^{2} (233.89 sq mi)

Population (2008)
  - Total: 114,020
  - Density: 188.1/km^{2} (487/sq mi)
- Time zone: UTC+7 (ICT)
- Postal code: 44120
- Geocode: 4409

Wapi Pathum (Thai: วาปีปทุม, pronounced [wāː.pīː pā.tʰūm]; Northeastern Thai: วาปีปทุม, pronounced [wâː.pìː pā.tʰûm]) is a district (amphoe) of Maha Sarakham province, northeastern Thailand.

== Geography ==
Neighbouring districts are (from the south clockwise): Na Dun, Na Chueak, Borabue, Mueang Maha Sarakham, and Kae Dam of Maha Sarakham Province; Si Somdet, Chaturaphak Phiman, Kaset Wisai, and Pathum Rat of Roi Et province.

== History ==
The district dates back to Mueang Wapi Pathum, which was converted into a district around 1900.

== Administration ==
The district is divided into 15 sub-districts (tambons), which are further subdivided into 240 villages (mubans). Nong Saeng is a sub-district municipality (thesaban tambon) which covers parts of tambon Nong Saeng. There are a further 15 tambon administrative organizations (TAO).

No.	Name	Thai	Villages	Pop.
1.	Nong Saeng	หนองแสง	28	21,063
2.	Kham Pom	ขามป้อม	16	6,589
3.	Suea Kok	เสือโก้ก	19	10,319
4.	Dong Yai	ดงใหญ่	16	5,013
5.	Pho Chai	โพธิ์ชัย	12	4,500
6.	Hua Ruea	หัวเรือ	21	10,486
7.	Khaen	แคน	17	6,727
8.	Ngua Ba	งัวบา	19	8,069
9.	Na Kha	นาข่า	16	8,823
10.	Ban Wai	บ้านหวาย	17	7,410
11.	Nong Hai	หนองไฮ	17	7,855
12.	Pracha Phatthana	ประชาพัฒนา	11	4,487
13.	Nong Thum	หนองทุ่ม	10	3,987
14.	Nong Saen	หนองแสน	10	4,319
15.	Khok Si Thonglang	โคกสีทองหลาง	11	4,373
