= Na Chueak district =

Na Chueak นาเชือก
- District
- District location in Maha Sarakham province
- Coordinates: 15°48′0″N 103°1′54″E
- Country: Thailand
- Province: Maha Sarakham

Area
  - Total: 528.198 km^{2} (203.938 sq mi)

Population (2008)
  - Total: 60,856
  - Density: 115.2/km^{2} (298/sq mi)
- Time zone: UTC+7 (ICT)
- Postal code: 44170
- Geocode: 4407

Na Chueak (Thai: นาเชือก, pronounced [nāː tɕʰɯ̂ak]; Northeastern Thai: นาเซียก, pronounced [nâː sȉak]) is a district (amphoe) in the south of Maha Sarakham province, northeastern Thailand.

== Geography ==
Neighboring districts are (from the north clockwise): Kut Rang, Borabue, Wapi Pathum, Na Dun, and Yang Sisurat of Maha Sarakham Province; Na Pho of Buriram province; and Nong Song Hong and Pueai Noi of Khon Kaen province.

== History ==
The area was made a minor district (king amphoe) on 19 July 1960 by splitting it off from Borabue district. It was upgraded to a full district in 1963.

== Administration ==
The district is divided into 10 sub-districts (tambons), which are further subdivided into 146 villages (mubans). Na Chueak is a sub-district municipality (thesaban tambon) which covers parts of tambons Na Chueak and Khwao Rai. There are a further 10 tambon administrative organizations (TAO).

No.	Name	Thai	Villages	Pop.
1.	Na Chueak	นาเชือก	18	8,825
2.	Samrong	สำโรง	15	6,839
3.	Nong Daeng	หนองแดง	10	3,969
4.	Khwao Rai	เขวาไร่	19	7,735
5.	Nong Pho	หนองโพธิ์	12	5,237
6.	Po Phan	ปอพาน	16	8,055
7.	Nong Mek	หนองเม็ก	20	6,661
8.	Nong Ruea	หนองเรือ	13	5,166
9.	Nong Kung	หนองกุง	11	3,949
10.	San Pa Tong	สันป่าตอง	12	4,420
