= Phayakkhaphum Phisai district =

Phayakkhaphum Phisai พยัคฆภูมิพิสัย
- District
- District location in Maha Sarakham province
- Coordinates: 15°30′59″N 103°11′37″E
- Country: Thailand
- Province: Maha Sarakham

Area
  - Total: 409.783 km^{2} (158.218 sq mi)

Population (2008)
  - Total: 88,124
  - Density: 214.5/km^{2} (556/sq mi)
- Time zone: UTC+7 (ICT)
- Postal code: 44110
- Geocode: 4408

Phayakkhaphum Phisai (Thai: พยัคฆภูมิพิสัย, pronounced [pʰā.ják.kʰā.pʰūːm pʰí.sǎj]; Northeastern Thai: พยัคฆภูมิพิสัย, pronounced [pʰā.ɲàk.kʰā.pʰûːm pʰì.sǎj]) is a district (amphoe) of Maha Sarakham province, northeastern Thailand.

== Geography ==
Neighboring districts are (from the north clockwise): Yang Sisurat and Na Dun of Maha Sarakham Province; Pathum Rat, and Kaset Wisai of Roi Et province; Chumphon Buri of Surin province; and Phutthaisong of Buriram province.

== Administration ==
The district is divided into 14 sub-districts (tambons), which are further subdivided into 227 villages (mubans). Phayakkhaphum Phisai is a sub-district municipality (thesaban tambon) which covers parts of tambons Palan and Lan Sakae. There are a further 14 tambon administrative organizations (TAO).

No.	Name	Thai	Villages	Pop.
1.	Palan	ปะหลาน	16	11,323
2.	Kam Pu	ก้ามปู	17	6,772
3.	Wiang Sa-at	เวียงสะอาด	21	6,030
4.	Mek Dam	เม็กดำ	22	9,690
5.	Na Si Nuan	นาสีนวล	14	5,939
9.	Rat Charoen	ราษฎร์เจริญ	14	5,125
10.	Nong Bua Kaeo	หนองบัวแก้ว	16	6,145
12.	Mueang Tao	เมืองเตา	26	7,922
15.	Lan Sakae	ลานสะแก	19	6,881
16.	Wiang Chai	เวียงชัย	14	3,934
17.	Nong Bua	หนองบัว	13	5,852
18.	Rat Phatthana	ราษฎร์พัฒนา	14	3,852
19.	Mueang Suea	เมืองเสือ	11	4,507
20.	Phan Aen	ภารแอ่น	10	4,152

Missing numbers are tambons which now form Yang Sisurat District.
