= Nong Song Hong district =

Nong Song Hong หนองสองห้อง
- District
- District location in Khon Kaen province
- Coordinates: 15°44′1″N 102°47′44″E
- Country: Thailand
- Province: Khon Kaen
- Seat: Nong Song Hong

Area
  - Total: 514.504 km^{2} (198.651 sq mi)

Population (2005)
  - Total: 78,610
  - Density: 152.8/km^{2} (396/sq mi)
- Time zone: UTC+7 (ICT)
- Postal code: 40190
- Geocode: 4015

Nong Song Hong (Thai: หนองสองห้อง, pronounced [nɔ̌ːŋ sɔ̌ːŋ hɔ̂ŋ]; Northeastern Thai: หนองสองห้อง, pronounced [nɔ̌ːŋ sɔ̌ːŋ hɔ̀ŋ]) is a district (amphoe) in the southern part of Khon Kaen province, northeastern Thailand.

== Geography ==
Neighboring districts are (from the west clockwise): Phon, Non Sila, Ban Phai. and Pueai Noi of Khon Kaen Province; Na Chueak of Maha Sarakham province; Na Pho, Phutthaisong and Ban Mai Chaiyaphot of Buriram province; and Prathai of Nakhon Ratchasima province.

== History ==
The minor district (king amphoe) was created on 1 January 1962, when the four tambons: Takua Pa, Nong Mek, Non That, and Khuemchat were split off from Phon district. It was upgraded to a full district on 16 July 1963.

== Administration ==
The district is divided into 12 subdistricts (tambons), which are further subdivided into 135 villages (mubans). Nong Song Hong is a township (thesaban tambon) which covers parts of tambon Nong Song Hong. There are a further 12 tambon administrative organizations (TAO).

No.	Name	Thai name	Villages	Pop.
1.	Nong Song Hong	หนองสองห้อง	17	13,127
2.	Khuemchat	คึมชาด	9	6,615
3.	Non That	โนนธาตุ	11	5,687
4.	Takua Pa	ตะกั่วป่า	11	6,160
5.	Samrong	สำโรง	9	5,910
6.	Nong Mek	หนองเม็ก	15	7,933
7.	Don Du	ดอนดู่	11	8,326
8.	Dong Kheng	ดงเค็ง	13	6,841
9.	Han Chot	หันโจด	12	4,143
10.	Don Dang	ดอนดั่ง	10	4,655
11.	Wang Hin	วังหิน	8	4,627
12.	Nong Phai Lom	หนองไผ่ล้อม	9	4,586
