= Kut Rang district =

Kut Rang กุดรัง
- District
- District location in Maha Sarakham province
- Coordinates: 16°3′6″N 102°59′36″E
- Country: Thailand
- Province: Maha Sarakham
- Seat: Kut Rang

Area
  - Total: 267.0 km^{2} (103.1 sq mi)

Population (2005)
  - Total: 36,144
  - Density: 135.4/km^{2} (351/sq mi)
- Time zone: UTC+7 (ICT)
- Postal code: 44130
- Geocode: 4412

Kut Rang (Thai: กุดรัง, pronounced [kùt rāŋ]; Northeastern Thai: กุดฮัง, pronounced [kǔt hâŋ]) is a district (amphoe) of Maha Sarakham province, northeastern Thailand.

== Geography ==
Neighboring districts are (from the north clockwise): Kosum Phisai, Borabue, and Na Chueak of Maha Sarakham Province; and Pueai Noi and Ban Phai of Khon Kaen province.

== History ==
The minor district (king amphoe) was split off from Borabue district on 1 April 1995.

All 81 minor districts were upgraded to full districts in 2007. With publication in the Royal Gazette on 24 August, the upgrade became official.

== Administration ==
The district is divided into five sub-districts (tambons), which are further subdivided into 85 villages (mubans). There are no municipal (thesabans). There are five tambon administrative organizations (TAO).

| No. | Name | Thai name | Villages | Pop. |
|---|---|---|---|---|
| 1. | Kut Rang | กุดรัง | 16 | 6,724 |
| 2. | Na Pho | นาโพธิ์ | 21 | 9,899 |
| 3. | Loeng Faek | เลิงแฝก | 15 | 8,273 |
| 4. | Nong Waeng | หนองแวง | 14 | 5,859 |
| 5. | Huai Toei | ห้วยเตย | 19 | 5,389 |
