= Kae Dam district =

Kae Dam แกดำ
- District
- District location in Maha Sarakham province
- Coordinates: 16°1′30″N 103°23′6″E
- Country: Thailand
- Province: Maha Sarakham
- Seat: Kae Dam

Area
  - Total: 149.5 km^{2} (57.7 sq mi)

Population (2005)
  - Total: 29,218
  - Density: 195.4/km^{2} (506/sq mi)
- Time zone: UTC+7 (ICT)
- Postal code: 44190
- Geocode: 4402

Kae Dam (Thai: แกดำ, pronounced [kɛ̄ː dām]) is a district (amphoe) in the east of Maha Sarakham province, northeastern Thailand.

== Geography ==
Neighboring districts are (from the south clockwise): Wapi Pathum and Mueang Maha Sarakham of Maha Sarakham Province, and Si Somdet of Roi Et province.

== History ==
The minor district (king amphoe) was created on 3 January 1977, when the three tambons, Kae Dam, Nong Kung, and Mittraphap were split off from Mueang Maha Sarakham district. It was upgraded to a full district on 1 January 1988.

== Administration ==
The district is divided into five sub-districts (tambons), which are further subdivided into 89 villages (mubans). Kae Dam is a township (thesaban tambon) which covers parts of tambon Kae Dam. There are a further five tambon administrative organizations (TAO).

No.	Name	Thai name	Villages	Pop.
1.	Kae Dam	แกดำ	18	8,708
2.	Wang Saeng	วังแสง	20	5,703
3.	Mittraphap	มิตรภาพ	21	6,781
4.	Nong Kung	หนองกุง	16	4,181
5.	Non Phi Ban	โนนภิบาล	14	3,845
