= Tha Phae district =

Tha Phae ท่าแพ
- District
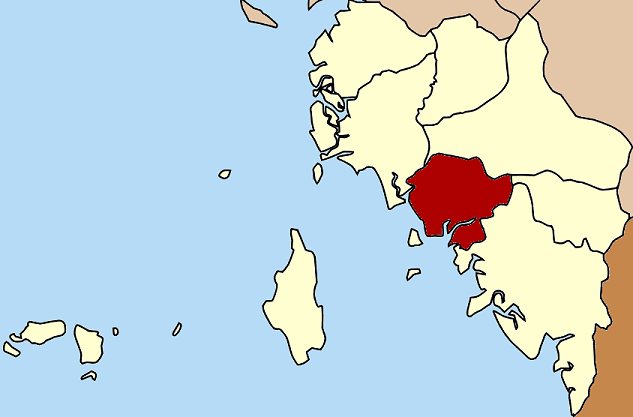
- District location in Satun province
- Coordinates: 6°47′24″N 99°58′12″E
- Country: Thailand
- Province: Satun
- Seat: Tha Phae

Area
  - Total: 197.25 km^{2} (76.16 sq mi)

Population (2005)
  - Total: 24,991
  - Density: 126.7/km^{2} (328/sq mi)
- Time zone: UTC+7 (ICT)
- Postal code: 91150
- Geocode: 9104

Tha Phae (Thai: ท่าแพ, pronounced [tʰâː pʰɛ̄ː]) is a district (amphoe) of Satun province, southern Thailand.

== History ==
The minor district (king amphoe) Tha Phae was established on 1 May 1976 with the two southwestern tambons, Tha Phae and Pae Ra of the district Khuan Kalong. It was upgraded to a full district on 4 July 1994.

== Geography ==
Neighboring districts are (from the northwest clockwise) La-ngu, Khuan Kalong, Khuan Don and Mueang Satun. To the southwest is the Andaman Sea.

== Administration ==
The district is divided into four sub-districts (tambons), which are further subdivided into 28 villages (muban). There are no municipal (thesaban) areas, and four tambon administrative organizations (TAO).

No.	Name	Thai name	Villages	Pop.	Area (km²)
1.	Tha Phae	ท่าแพ	9	8,570	57.62
2.	Paera	แป-ระ	6	5,116	36.94
3.	Sakhon	สาคร	7	7,018	67.18
4.	Tha Ruea	ท่าเรือ	6	4,287	50.21
