= Yang Sisurat district =

Yang Sisurat ยางสีสุราช
- District
- District location in Maha Sarakham province
- Coordinates: 15°41′24″N 103°6′12″E
- Country: Thailand
- Province: Maha Sarakham
- Seat: Yang Sisurat

Area
  - Total: 242.5 km^{2} (93.6 sq mi)

Population (2005)
  - Total: 35,482
  - Density: 146.3/km^{2} (379/sq mi)
- Time zone: UTC+7 (ICT)
- Postal code: 44210
- Geocode: 4411

Yang Sisurat (Thai: ยางสีสุราช, pronounced [jāːŋ sǐː sù.râːt]; Northeastern Thai: ยางสีสุราช, pronounced [ɲâːŋ sǐː sȕ.lâːt]) is a district (amphoe) in the south of Maha Sarakham province, northeastern Thailand.

== Geography ==
Neighboring districts are (from the north clockwise): Na Chueak, Na Dun, and Phayakkhaphum Phisai of Maha Sarakham Province; Phutthaisong and Na Pho of Buriram province.

== History ==
The minor district (king amphoe) was created on 1 April 1989, when six tambons were split off from Phayakkhaphum Phisai district. It was upgraded to a full district on 8 September 1995.

== Administration ==
The district is divided into seven sub-districts (tambons), which are further subdivided into 91 villages (mubans). There are no municipal (thesaban) areas, and seven tambon administrative organizations (TAO).

No.	Name	Thai name	Villages	Pop.
1.	Yang Sisurat	ยางสีสุราช	13	6,153
2.	Na Phu	นาภู	17	6,307
3.	Waeng Dong	แวงดง	19	7,002
4.	Ban Ku	บ้านกู่	9	4,123
5.	Dong Mueang	ดงเมือง	9	2,742
6.	Sang Saeng	สร้างแซ่ง	12	4,082
7.	Nong Bua Santu	หนองบัวสันตุ	12	5,073
