= La-ngu district =

La-ngu ละงู
- District
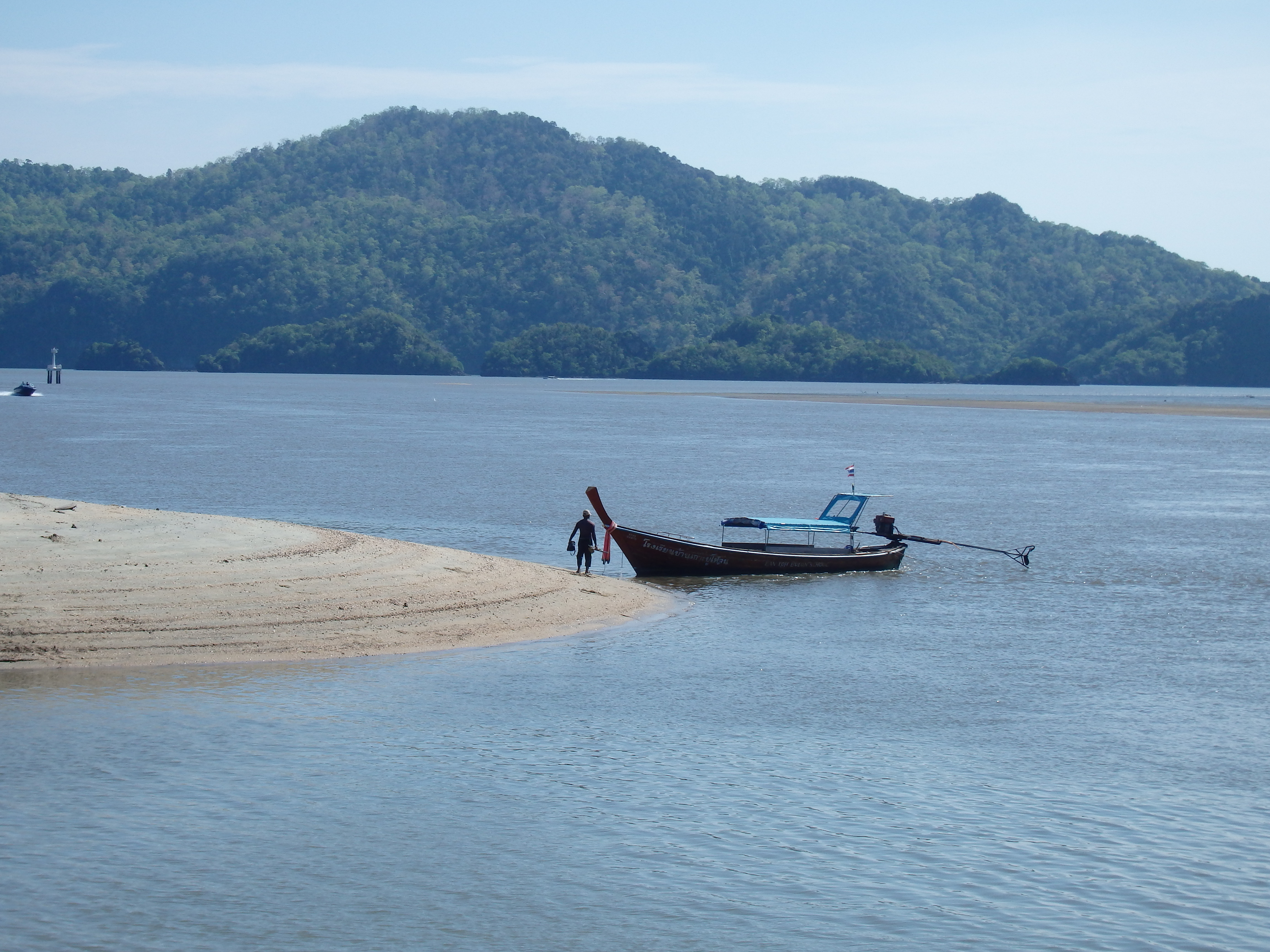
- Tambon Pak Nam, La-ngu District

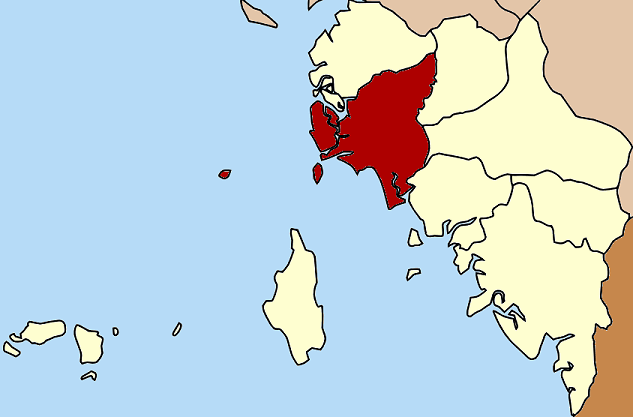
- District location in Satun province
- Coordinates: 6°51′50″N 99°48′9″E
- Country: Thailand
- Province: Satun
- Seat: La-ngu

Area
  - Total: 380.35 km^{2} (146.85 sq mi)

Population (2005)
  - Total: 63,933
  - Density: 168.1/km^{2} (435/sq mi)
- Time zone: UTC+7 (ICT)
- Postal code: 91110
- Geocode: 9105

La-ngu (Thai: ละงู, pronounced [lā.ŋūː]) is a district (amphoe) of Satun province, southern Thailand. La-ngu's port, Pak Bara, is the ferry port year-round for boats going to most of the islands in Tarutao Marine National Park, which includes Ko Lipe. It is now the proposed site of Thailand's deep-seaport on the Andaman Sea.

== History ==
La-ngu was one of the three original districts of Satun, at first a minor district (king amphoe) under Thung Wa District. When the pepper production in Thung Wa District declined in the 1910s, many natives moved to the farmland of La-ngu. In 1930 the government adjusted the administrative structure to match the changed economic situation, making La-ngu a district and reducing Thung Wa to a minor district under La-ngu.

At first subdivided into seven tambon, in 1940 these were reduced to five. The sixth tambon, Khao Khao, was created on 1 August 1978.

== Geography ==
Neighboring districts are (from the north clockwise) Thung Wa, Manang, Khuan Kalong, and Tha Phae. To the west is the Andaman Sea.

A big part of the shoreline of the district as well as several islands are part of the Mu Ko Phetra National Park.

== Ethnic groups ==
The Maniq people, from the Negrito ethnic group which immigrated from the northern states of Malaysia, inhabit the Banthat Mountains in tambon Nam Phut of La-ngu District.

== Administration ==
The district is divided into six sub-districts (tambon), which are further subdivided into 64 villages (muban). Kamphaeng is a township (thesaban tambon) which covers parts of tambon Kamphaeng. There are a further six tambon administrative organizations (TAO).

No.	Name	Thai name	Villages	Pop.l
1.	Kamphaeng	กำแพง	12	16,915
2.	La-ngu	ละงู	18	19,796
3.	Khao Khao	เขาขาว	7	6,020
4.	Pak Nam	ปากน้ำ	11	9,757
5.	Nam Phut	น้ำผุด	6	7,982
6.	Laem Son	แหลมสน	10	3,463

== Pak Bara deep-seaport ==
For more than two decades, plans for a deep-seaport at Pak Bara in La-ngu District have been vetted by the government, only to be dropped, then revived by successive governments. The seaport will be linked to a port in Songkhla on the Gulf of Thailand. The port will be capable of accommodating 825,000 TEU of cargo per year as well as supertankers. It would mean that vessels would not have to sail through the Malacca Straits, notorious for pirate attacks, to reach deep seaports at Laem Chabang or Bangkok. Construction of the port would involve the creation of an artificial island 430 m wide and one kilometre long, an area of 292 rai about four kilometres offshore connected by a bridge. The project includes the construction of roads, port facilities and railway lines, all totalling about 4,734 rai (757 hectares).

In his televised address of 17 April 2014, Prime Minister Prayut Chan-o-cha, once again proposed that the project go ahead. The project has been vociferously opposed by environmental groups and many local residents. Prayut said the port would be Thailand's gateway to the Andaman Sea, linking the country with Europe, the Middle East, and Africa. He went on to say, "I ask that conflicts in this area be halted. The government will help those affected by this project." Locals say marine traffic, pollution and contamination from logistic and petroleum activities will ruin the environment. The seaport and shipping lanes encroach on Mu Ko Phetra National Park, a source of local food and tourist revenue for locals. Construction of the seaport would mean that some of the national park would lose its protected status.

A strategic environmental assessment (SEA) was initiated in 2003, to be submitted in April 2016 at a cost of 50 million baht. An environmental impact assessment (EIA) was completed and approved in June 2009. At that time the project's owner, the Marine Department, was ordered to conduct an environmental and health impact assessment (EHIA), budgeted at 118 million baht. The EHIA was started in March 2015.

In July 2018 the Ministry of Transport "shelved" the 9.7 billion baht project "...to avoid fuelling conflicts between residents and state officials,..." The port's construction would have required the expropriation of about 7,400 rai of land close to Ko Petra Marine National Park. A government source said, "...it is about time to shelve the project because we cannot proceed with conducting an environmental impact assessment and public hearings as local villagers usually refuse to participate,..." The suspension of the project immediately raised suspicions that the move was a ploy by the government to revive its popularity ahead of the 2019 elections after a series of public relations set-backs. A Bangkok Post editorial explained that, "...in Thailand, 'being shelved' is a synonym for buying time—most controversial projects re-emerge after public attention fades." As predicted by the Bangkok Post, in December 2019, the project was revived.
