= Na Pho district =

Na Pho นาโพธิ์
- District
- District location in Buriram province
- Coordinates: 15°38′42″N 102°57′6″E
- Country: Thailand
- Province: Buriram
- Seat: Na Pho

Area
  - Total: 255.0 km^{2} (98.5 sq mi)

Population (2005)
  - Total: 33,135
  - Density: 129.9/km^{2} (336/sq mi)
- Time zone: UTC+7 (ICT)
- Postal code: 31230
- Geocode: 3113

Na Pho (Thai: นาโพธิ์, pronounced [nāː pʰōː]; Northeastern Thai: นาโพธิ์, pronounced [nâː pʰôː]) is the northernmost district (amphoe) of Buriram province, northeastern Thailand.

== Geography ==
Neighbouring districts are (from the south clockwise) Phutthaisong of Buriram Province, Nong Song Hong of Khon Kaen province, Na Chueak and Yang Sisurat of Maha Sarakham province.

== History ==
The minor district (king amphoe) was created on 31 March 1981, when the four tambons Na Pho, Ban Khu, Ban Du, and Don Kok were split off from Phutthaisong district. It was upgraded to a full district on 1 January 1988.

== Motto ==
The Na Pho District's motto is "Northern city of Buriram, excellence culture, rocket festival and beautiful Na Pho's silk."

== Administration ==
The district is divided into five sub-districts (tambons), which are further subdivided into 71 villages (mubans). Na Pho is a township (thesaban tambon) which covers parts of tambons Na Pho and Si Sawang. There are a further five tambon administrative organizations (TAO).

| No. | Name | Thai name | Villages | Pop. |
|---|---|---|---|---|
| 1. | Na Pho | นาโพธิ์ | 18 | 7,189 |
| 2. | Ban Khu | บ้านคู | 15 | 6,947 |
| 3. | Ban Du | บ้านดู่ | 12 | 5,613 |
| 4. | Don Kok | ดอนกอก | 16 | 7,922 |
| 5. | Si Sawang | ศรีสว่าง | 10 | 5,464 |
