= Pathum Rat district =

Pathum Rat ปทุมรัตต์
- District
- District location in Roi Et province
- Coordinates: 15°38′6″N 103°20′36″E
- Country: Thailand
- Province: Roi Et
- Seat: Bua Daeng

Area
  - Total: 356.9 km^{2} (137.8 sq mi)

Population (2021)
  - Total: 47,286
  - Density: 132.49/km^{2} (343.1/sq mi)
- Time zone: UTC+7 (ICT)
- Postal code: 45190
- Geocode: 4503

Pathum Rat (Thai: ปทุมรัตต์, pronounced [pā.tʰūm rát]; Northeastern Thai: ปทุมรัตต์, pronounced [pā.tʰûm làt]) is a district (amphoe) in the southwestern part of Roi Et province, Thailand.

== Geography ==
Neighboring districts are (from the east clockwise): Kaset Wisai of Roi Et Province; Phayakkhaphum Phisai, Na Dun, and Wapi Pathum of Maha Sarakham province.

== History ==
The minor district (king amphoe) was created on 15 June 1963, when three tambons, Bua Daeng, Phon Sung, and Non Sawan were split off from Kaset Wisai district. It was upgraded to a full district on 27 July 1965.

== Economy ==
The district's economy is agricultural. The area is known for its hom mali rice. It is the district's OTOP (One Tambon One Product) product.

Although the district, as of 2019, has no sugar cane cultivation, Banpong Sugar Company plans to build a sugar mill in the district to process about 24,000 tons of sugarcane a day. The facility is to be powered by sugarcane residue. Banpong Sugar belongs to the Banpong Group, the seventh largest Thai sugar-milling group, with mills in Phetchaburi and Kamphaeng Phet. It held 4.2% of the Thai sugar market in 2017.

== Administration ==
=== Central administration ===
The Pathum Rat district is divided into eight sub-districts (tambons), which are further subdivided into 101 administrative villages (mubans).

No.	Name	Thai	Villages	Pop.
1.	Bua Daeng	บัวแดง	7	3,486
2.	Dok Lam	ดอกล้ำ	15	8,004
3.	Nong Khaen	หนองแคน	14	7,616
4.	Phon Sung	โพนสูง	9	4,996
5.	Non Sawan	โนนสวรรค์	16	6,913
6.	Sa Bua	สระบัว	17	7,928
7.	Non Sa-nga	โนนสง่า	8	3,589
8.	Khilek	ขี้เหล็ก	8	4,761

=== Local administration ===
There are three sub-district municipalities (thesaban tambons) in the district:

- Pathum Rat (Thai: เทศบาลตำบลปทุมรัตต์) consisting of parts of sub-districts Bua Daeng and Non Sa-nga.
- Phon Sung (Thai: เทศบาลตำบลโพนสูง) consisting of sub-district Phon Sung.
- Non Sawan (Thai: เทศบาลตำบลโนนสวรรค์) consisting of sub-district Non Sawan.

There are six sub-district administrative organizations (SAO) in the district:

- Bua Daeng (Thai: องค์การบริหารส่วนตำบลบัวแดง) consisting of parts of sub-district Bua Daeng.
- Dok Lam (Thai: องค์การบริหารส่วนตำบลดอกล้ำ) consisting of sub-district Dok Lam.
- Nong Khaen (Thai: องค์การบริหารส่วนตำบลหนองแคน) consisting of sub-district Nong Khaen.
- Sa Bua (Thai: องค์การบริหารส่วนตำบลสระบัว) consisting of sub-district Sa Bua.
- Non Sa-nga (Thai: องค์การบริหารส่วนตำบลโนนสง่า) consisting of parts of sub-district Non Sa-nga.
- Khilek (Thai: องค์การบริหารส่วนตำบลขี้เหล็ก) consisting of sub-district Khilek.
