= Na Dun district =

Na Dun นาดูน
- District
- District location in Maha Sarakham province
- Coordinates: 15°42′50″N 103°13′37″E
- Country: Thailand
- Province: Maha Sarakham
- Seat: Na Dun

Area
  - Total: 248.449 km^{2} (95.927 sq mi)

Population (2005)
  - Total: 36,485
  - Density: 14/km^{2} (36/sq mi)
- Time zone: UTC+7 (ICT)
- Postal code: 44180
- Geocode: 4410

Na Dun (Thai: นาดูน, pronounced [nāː dūːn]; Northeastern Thai: นาดูน, pronounced [nâː dùːn]) is a district (amphoe) in the south of Maha Sarakham province, northeastern Thailand.

== Geography ==
Neighboring districts are (from the south clockwise): Phayakkhaphum Phisai, Yang Sisurat, Na Chueak, and Wapi Pathum of Maha Sarakham Province, and Pathum Rat of Roi Et province.

== History ==
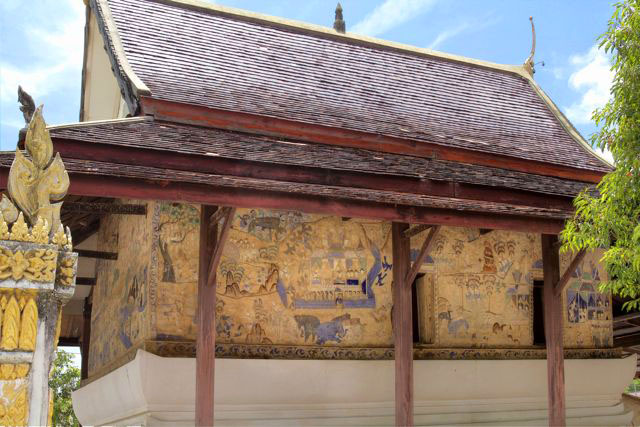
Murals illustrating the poem of Sang Sinxay adorn the exterior of Wat Photaram

The area was made a minor district (king amphoe) on 1 October 1969, when the three tambons, Na Dun, Nong Phai, and Nong Khu, were split off from Wapi Pathum district. It was upgraded to a full district on 25 March 1979.

== Administration ==
The district is divided into nine sub-districts (tambons), which are further subdivided into 94 villages (mubans). Na Dun is a township (thesaban tambon) which covers parts of tambons Na Dun and Phra That. There are a further eight tambon administrative organizations (TAO).

| No. | Name | Thai name | Villages | Pop. |
|---|---|---|---|---|
| 1. | Na Dun | นาดูน | 10 | 4,468 |
| 2. | Nong Phai | หนองไผ่ | 8 | 3,782 |
| 3. | Nong Khu | หนองคู | 14 | 5,512 |
| 4. | Dong Bang | ดงบัง | 9 | 2,692 |
| 5. | Dong Duan | ดงดวน | 10 | 4,071 |
| 6. | Hua Dong | หัวดง | 15 | 5,054 |
| 7. | Dong Yang | ดงยาง | 11 | 4,275 |
| 8. | Ku Santarat | กู่สันตรัตน์ | 9 | 3,715 |
| 9. | Phra That | พระธาตุ | 8 | 2,916 |
