= Kaset Wisai district =

Kaset Wisai เกษตรวิสัย
- District
- District location in Roi Et province
- Coordinates: 15°39′22″N 103°34′48″E
- Country: Thailand
- Province: Roi Et
- Seat: Kaset Wisai

Area
  - Total: 580.1 km^{2} (224.0 sq mi)

Population (2005)
  - Total: 99,024
  - Density: 170.7/km^{2} (442/sq mi)
- Time zone: UTC+7 (ICT)
- Postal code: 45150
- Geocode: 4502

Kaset Wisai (Thai: เกษตรวิสัย, pronounced [kā.sèːt wí(ʔ).sǎj]; Northeastern Thai: เกษตรวิสัย, pronounced [kā.sèːt wì(ʔ).sǎj]) is a district (amphoe) in southwestern Roi Et province, Thailand.

== Geography ==
Neighboring districts are (from the north clockwise): Chaturaphak Phiman, Mueang Suang, Suwannaphum of Roi Et Province; Phayakkhaphum Phisai of Maha Sarakham province; Pathum Rat of Roi Et Province; and Wapi Pathum of Maha Sarakham province.

== History ==
Originally named Nong Waeng, it was renamed Kaset Wisai in 1939.

== Administration ==
The district is divided into 13 sub-districts (tambons), which are further subdivided into 175 villages (mubans). There are two townships (thesaban tambons): Kaset Wisai and Ku Ka Sing. Each covers parts of the same-named tambon. There are a further 13 tambon administrative organizations (TAO).

| No. | Name | Thai name | Villages | Pop. |
|---|---|---|---|---|
| 1. | Kaset Wisai | เกษตรวิสัย | 18 | 16,420 |
| 2. | Mueang Bua | เมืองบัว | 13 | 8,632 |
| 3. | Lao Luang | เหล่าหลวง | 15 | 7,541 |
| 4. | Sing Khok | สิงห์โคก | 13 | 7,289 |
| 5. | Dong Khrang Yai | ดงครั่งใหญ่ | 13 | 5,957 |
| 6. | Ban Fang | บ้านฝาง | 17 | 6,182 |
| 7. | Nong Waeng | หนองแวง | 15 | 8,186 |
| 8. | Kamphaeng | กำแพง | 12 | 6,447 |
| 9. | Ku Ka Sing | กู่กาสิงห์ | 13 | 9,259 |
| 10. | Nam Om | น้ำอ้อม | 9 | 5,016 |
| 11. | Non Sawang | โนนสว่าง | 14 | 5,385 |
| 12. | Thung Thong | ทุ่งทอง | 9 | 5,491 |
| 13. | Dong Khrang Noi | ดงครั่งน้อย | 14 | 7,219 |
