= Khao Suan Kwang district =

Khao Suan Kwang เขาสวนกวาง
- District
- District location in Khon Kaen province
- Coordinates: 16°51′31″N 102°51′42″E
- Country: Thailand
- Province: Khon Kaen
- Seat: Kham Muang

Area
  - Total: 329.9 km^{2} (127.4 sq mi)

Population (2005)
  - Total: 37,169
  - Density: 122.7/km^{2} (318/sq mi)
- Time zone: UTC+7 (ICT)
- Postal code: 40280
- Geocode: 4019

Khao Suan Kwang (Thai: เขาสวนกวาง, pronounced [kʰǎw sǔan kwāːŋ]; Northeastern Thai: เขาสวนกวาง, pronounced [kʰǎw sǔan kwàːŋ]) is a district (amphoe) of Khon Kaen province, northeastern Thailand.

== History ==
The minor district (king amphoe) Khao Suan Kwang was established in 1978 by splitting it from Nam Phong district. It was upgraded to a full district on 16 March 1985.

== Geography ==
Neighboring districts are (from the south clockwise): Nam Phong and Ubolratana of Khon Kaen Province; Non Sang of Nong Bua Lamphu province; Nong Wua So, Nong Saeng, and Non Sa-at of Udon Thani province.

== Administration ==
The district is divided into five subdistricts (tambons), which are further subdivided into 56 villages (mubans). Khao Suan Kwang is a township (thesaban tambon) which covers parts of tambons Khao Suan Kwang and Kham Muang. There are a further five tambon administrative organizations (TAO).

No.	Name	Thai name	Villages	Pop.
1.	Khao Suan Kwang	เขาสวนกวาง	11	8,849
2.	Dong Mueang Aem	ดงเมืองแอม	15	8,838
3.	Na Ngio	นางิ้ว	7	5,297
4.	Non Sombun	โนนสมบูรณ์	10	5,772
5.	Kham Muang	คำม่วง	13	8,413

== Khao Suan Kwang grilled chicken ==
Khao Suan Kwang is one of the districts that is famous for "Kai yang'' (Thai grilled chicken), like Bang Tan in Ratchaburi, Huai Thap Than in Sisaket, and Wichian Buri in the south of Phetchabun.

People from Khao Suan Kwang are known for their expert skills both raising and grilling chicken. Along both sides of the road leading to this district, there are many restaurants serving grilled chicken. It is a popular dish eaten with sticky rice and "som tam" (spicy green papaya salad). Currently, Khao Suan Kwang grilled chicken is sold in many places throughout the country, including Bangkok.
