= Nong Wua So district =

Nong Wua So หนองวัวซอ
- District
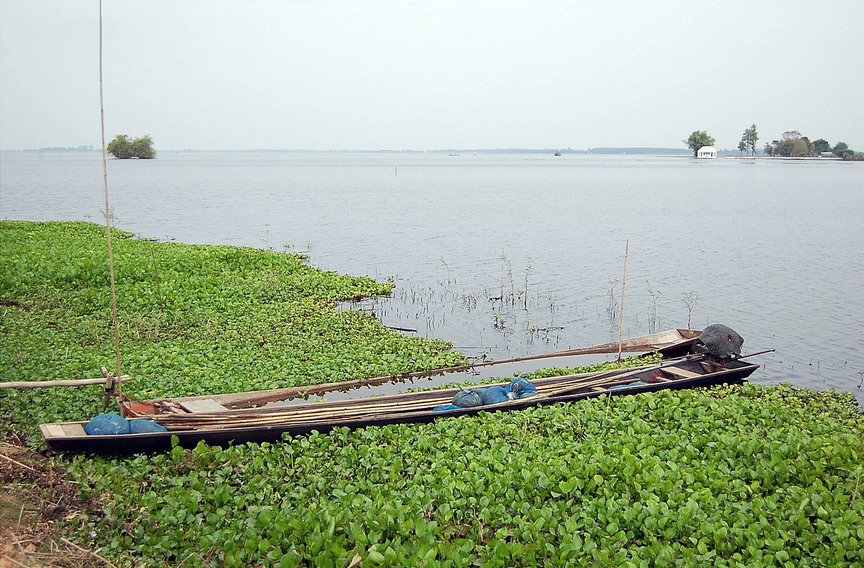
- Huai Luang Reservoir

- District location in Udon Thani province
- Coordinates: 17°9′45″N 102°34′22″E
- Country: Thailand
- Province: Udon Thani
- Seat: Non Wai

Area
  - Total: 702.955 km^{2} (271.412 sq mi)

Population (2005)
  - Total: 61,658
  - Density: 87.7/km^{2} (227/sq mi)
- Time zone: UTC+7 (ICT)
- Postal code: 41220
- Geocode: 4103

Nong Wua So (Thai: หนองวัวซอ, pronounced [nɔ̌ːŋ wūa sɔ̄ː]; Northeastern Thai: หนองงัวซอ, pronounced [nɔ̌ːŋ ŋûa sɔ̂ː]) is a district (amphoe) in the western part of Udon Thani province, northeastern Thailand.

== Geography ==
Neighboring districts are (from the north clockwise) Kut Chap, Mueang Udon Thani, and Nong Saeng of Udon Thani Province, Khao Suan Kwang of Khon Kaen province and Non Sang and Mueang Nongbua Lamphu of Nong Bua Lamphu province.

== History ==
The district was established as a minor district (king amphoe) on 16 April 1971, when it was split off from Mueang Udon Thani district. It was upgraded to a full district on 1 April 1974.

== Administration ==
The district is divided into eight sub-districts (tambons), which are further subdivided into 78 villages (mubans). There are two townships (thesaban tambon). Nong Wua So covers parts of tambons Nong Wua So and Mak Ya; and Nong O Non Wai covers parts of tambons Nong O and Non Wai. There are a further seven tambon administrative organizations (TAO).

No.	Name	Thai name	Villages	Pop.
1.	Mak Ya	หมากหญ้า	12	8,077
2.	Nong O	หนองอ้อ	11	9,055
3.	Up Mung	อูบมุง	10	8,435
4.	Kut Mak Fai	กุดหมากไฟ	11	7,984
5.	Nam Phon	น้ำพ่น	8	6,789
6.	Nong Bua Ban	หนองบัวบาน	9	6,077
7.	Non Wai	โนนหวาย	9	7,738
8.	Nong Wua So	หนองวัวซอ	8	7,503
