= Non Sa-at district =

Non Sa-at โนนสะอาด
- District
- District location in Udon Thani province
- Coordinates: 16°58′42″N 102°53′36″E
- Country: Thailand
- Province: Udon Thani
- Seat: Non Sa-at

Area
  - Total: 424.913 km^{2} (164.060 sq mi)

Population (2017)
  - Total: 45,543
  - Density: 114/km^{2} (300/sq mi)
- Time zone: UTC+7 (ICT)
- Postal code: 41240
- Geocode: 4105

Non Sa-at (Thai: โนนสะอาด, pronounced [nōːn sā.ʔàːt]; Northeastern Thai: โนนสะอาด, pronounced [nôːn sā.ʔàːt]) is a district (amphoe) in the southern part of Udon Thani province, northeastern Thailand.

== Geography ==
Neighboring districts are (from the north clockwise) Nong Saeng and Kumphawapi of Udon Thani Province, Kranuan, Nam Phong, and Khao Suan Kwang of Khon Kaen province.

== History ==
The minor district (king amphoe) was established on 21 January 1974, when the three tambons, Non Sa-at, Pho Si Samran, and Bung Kaeo, were split off from Kumphawapi district. It was upgraded to a full district on 12 April 1977.

== Administration ==
The district is divided into six sub-districts (tambons), which are further subdivided into 63 villages (mubans). Non Sa-at is a township (thesaban tambon) which covers parts of tambon Non Sa-at. There are a further six tambon administrative organizations (TAO).

| No. | Name | Thai name | Villages | Pop. |
|---|---|---|---|---|
| 1. | Non Sa-at | โนนสะอาด | 9 | 8,666 |
| 2. | Bung Kaeo | บุ่งแก้ว | 12 | 10,746 |
| 3. | Pho Si Samran | โพธิ์ศรีสำราญ | 9 | 8,164 |
| 4. | Thom Na Ngam | ทมนางาม | 10 | 7,077 |
| 5. | Nong Kung Si | หนองกุงศรี | 11 | 6,813 |
| 6. | Khok Klang | โคกกลาง | 12 | 6,993 |

== Economy ==
Non Sa-at is a source for growing mulberries and raising sericulture to produce good quality Thai silk.
