= Si Somdet district =

Si Somdet ศรีสมเด็จ
- District
- District location in Roi Et province
- Coordinates: 15°59′14″N 103°30′39″E
- Country: Thailand
- Province: Roi Et
- Seat: Si Somdet

Area
  - Total: 217.43 km^{2} (83.95 sq mi)

Population (2005)
  - Total: 37,161
  - Density: 170.9/km^{2} (443/sq mi)
- Time zone: UTC+7 (ICT)
- Postal code: 45000
- Geocode: 4516

Si Somdet (Thai: ศรีสมเด็จ, pronounced [sǐː sǒm.dèt]; Northeastern Thai: ศรีสมเด็จ, pronounced [sǐː sǒm.dět]) is a district (amphoe) in Roi Et province, Thailand.

== Geography ==
Neighboring districts are (from the north clockwise): Mueang Roi Et and Chaturaphak Phiman of Roi Et Province; Wapi Pathum, Kae Dam, and Mueang Maha Sarakham of Maha Sarakham province.

== History ==
The district was created on 1 April 1987, when the five tambons, Pho Thong, Si Somdet, Mueang Plueai, Nong Yai, and Suan Chik were split off from Mueang Roi Et district. It was upgraded to a full district on 4 July 1994.

== Administration ==
The district is divided into eight sub-districts (tambons), which are further subdivided into 82 villages (mubans). There are no municipal (thesaban) areas; there are eight tambon administrative organizations (TAO).

No.	Name	Thai name	Villages	Pop.
1.	Pho Thong	โพธิ์ทอง	7	2,877
2.	Si Somdet	ศรีสมเด็จ	13	6,079
3.	Mueang Plueai	เมืองเปลือย	8	3,075
4.	Nong Yai	หนองใหญ่	10	3,883
5.	Suan Chik	สวนจิก	14	5,447
6.	Phosai	โพธิ์สัย	10	8,043
7.	Nong Waeng Khuang	หนองแวงควง	12	4,926
8.	Ban Bak	บ้านบาก	8	2,831
