= Khuan Kalong district =

Khuan Kalong ควนกาหลง
- District
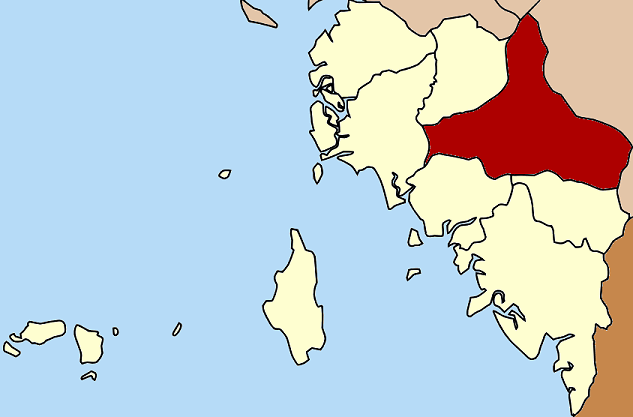
- District location in Satun province
- Coordinates: 6°50′48″N 100°4′18″E
- Country: Thailand
- Province: Satun
- Seat: Khuan Kalong

Area
  - Total: 412.9 km^{2} (159.4 sq mi)

Population (2005)
  - Total: 29,538
  - Density: 71.5/km^{2} (185/sq mi)
- Time zone: UTC+7 (ICT)
- Postal code: 91130
- Geocode: 9103

Khuan Kalong (Thai: ควนกาหลง, pronounced [kʰūa̯n kāː.lǒŋ]) is a district (amphoe) of Satun province, southern Thailand.

== History ==
The minor district (king amphoe) Khuan Kalong was established on 1 June 1969 by splitting the three tambons Thung Nui, Pae-ra, and Tha Phae from Mueang Satun district. It was upgraded to a full district on 8 September 1976. On 1 June 1976 the two southwestern tambons of the district were split off to form Tha Phae Minor district. In 1996 the northwestern part was split off to form Manang district

== Geography ==
Neighboring districts are (from the north clockwise) Palian of Trang province; Pa Bon of Phatthalung province; Rattaphum, Hat Yai, Khlong Hoi Khong and Sadao of Songkhla province; and Khuan Don, Tha Phae, La-ngu and Manang of Satun Province.

== Administration ==
The district is divided into three sub-districts (tambons), which are further subdivided into 31 villages (muban). There are no municipal (thesaban) areas, and three tambon administrative organizations (TAO).

No.	Name	Thai name	Villages	Pop.
1.	Thung Nui	ทุ่งนุ้ย	12	9,720
2.	Khuan Kalong	ควนกาหลง	11	12,412
3.	Udai Charoen	อุใดเจริญ	8	7,406
