= Nong Saeng district, Udon Thani =

Nong Saeng หนองแสง
- District
- District location in Udon Thani province
- Coordinates: 17°10′3″N 102°46′50″E
- Country: Thailand
- Province: Udon Thani
- Seat: Thap Kung

Area
  - Total: 659.4 km^{2} (254.6 sq mi)

Population (2005)
  - Total: 25,802
  - Density: 39.1/km^{2} (101/sq mi)
- Time zone: UTC+7 (ICT)
- Postal code: 41340
- Geocode: 4121

Nong Saeng (Thai: หนองแสง, pronounced [nɔ̌ːŋ sɛ̌ːŋ]) is a district (amphoe) of Udon Thani province, northeastern Thailand.

== Geography ==
Neighboring districts are (from the west clockwise) Nong Wua So, Mueang Udon Thani, Kumphawapi, and Non Sa-at of Udon Thani Province, and Khao Suan Kwang of Khon Kaen province.

== History ==
The area of the district was originally part of Kumphawapi district. It was made a minor district (king amphoe) on 1 January 1981, then consisting of two tambons and 27 villages. The district office was opened in village three of tambon Nong Saeng on 1 January 1983.

== Administration ==
The district is divided into four sub-districts (tambons), which are further subdivided into 38 villages (mubans). Saeng Sawang is a township (thesaban tambon) which covers parts of tambon Saeng Sawang. There are a further four tambon administrative organizations (TAO).

No.	Name	Thai name	Villages	Pop.
1.	Nong Saeng	หนองแสง	8	4,461
2.	Saeng Sawang	แสงสว่าง	8	7,157
3.	Na Di	นาดี	11	6,305
4.	Thap Kung	ทับกุง	11	7,879
