= Thung Wa district =

Thung Wa ทุ่งหว้า
- District
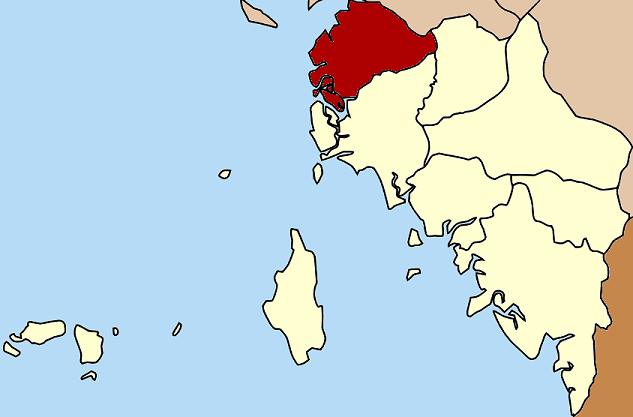
- District location in Satun province
- Coordinates: 7°6′33″N 99°45′21″E
- Country: Thailand
- Province: Satun
- Seat: Thung Wa

Area
  - Total: 452.33 km^{2} (174.65 sq mi)

Population (2005)
  - Total: 20,683
  - Density: 45.75/km^{2} (118.5/sq mi)
- Time zone: UTC+7 (ICT)
- Postal code: 91120
- Geocode: 9106

Thung Wa (Thai: ทุ่งหว้า, pronounced [tʰûŋ wâː]) is a district (amphoe) of Satun province, southern Thailand.

== History ==
Thung Wa was one of the three original districts of Satun. The main industry at the beginning of the 20th century was pepper production. When the production declined in the 1910s, many natives moved to the farmland of La-ngu minor district, while foreign merchants left the area completely. In 1930 the government adjusted the administrative structure to the changed economic situation, making La-ngu a district and reducing Thung Wa to a minor district (king amphoe) under La-ngu. In 1973 Thung Wa regained district status.

== Geography ==
Neighboring districts are (from the north clockwise) Palian of Trang province. Manang and La-ngu of Satun Province. To the west is the Andaman Sea.

A big part of the shoreline of the district as well as several islands are part of the Mu Ko Phetra National Park.

== Ethnic groups ==
The Maniq people, from the Negrito ethnic group which immigrated from the northern states of Malaysia, inhabit tambon Thung Wa of Thung Wa District.

== Administration ==
The district is divided into five sub-districts (tambon), which are further subdivided into 35 villages (muban). Thung Wa is a township (thesaban tambon) which covers parts of tambon Thung Wa. There are a further five tambon administrative organizations (TAO).

No.	Name	Thai name	Villages	Pop.
1.	Thung Wa	ทุ่งหว้า	10	6,242
2.	Nathon	นาทอน	9	6,316
3.	Khon Klan	ขอนคลาน	4	2,305
4.	Thung Bulang	ทุ่งบุหลัง	5	2,174
5.	Pakae Bohin	ป่าแก่บ่อหิน	7	3,646
