= Ban Mai Chaiyaphot district =

Ban Mai Chaiyaphot บ้านใหม่ไชยพจน์
- District
- District location in Buriram province
- Coordinates: 15°34′22″N 102°50′0″E
- Country: Thailand
- Province: Buriram
- Seat: Nong Waeng

Area
  - Total: 178.0 km^{2} (68.7 sq mi)

Population (2005)
  - Total: 26,988
  - Density: 151.6/km^{2} (393/sq mi)
- Time zone: UTC+7 (ICT)
- Postal code: 31120
- Geocode: 3119

Ban Mai Chaiyaphot (Thai: บ้านใหม่ไชยพจน์, pronounced [bâːn màj tɕʰāj.jā.pʰót]; Northeastern Thai: บ้านใหม่ไซยพจน์, pronounced [bâːn māj sa᷇j.ɲā.pʰòt]) is a district (amphoe) of Buriram province, northeastern Thailand.

== History ==
The minor district (king amphoe) Ban Mai Chaiyaphot was created on 1 April 1992 by splitting off five tambons from Phutthaisong district. On 11 October 1997 it was upgraded to a full district.

== Motto ==
The Ban Mai Chaiyaphot District's motto is "Ku Suan Taeng and Ku Reu See so elegant, beautiful silk, rocket festival."

== Geography ==
Neighboring districts are (from the east clockwise) Phutthaisong of Buriram Province, Mueang Yang and Prathai of Nakhon Ratchasima province, and Nong Song Hong of Khon Kaen province.

== Administration ==
The district is divided into five sub-districts (tambons), which are further subdivided into 55 villages (mubans). Ban Mai Chaiyaphot is a township (thesaban tambon) which covers parts of tambon Nong Waeng. There are also five tambon administrative organizations (TAO).

No.	Name	Thai name	Villages	Pop.
1.	Nong Waeng	หนองแวง	15	8,153
2.	Thonglang	ทองหลาง	10	5,402
3.	Daeng Yai	แดงใหญ่	9	4,706
4.	Ku Suan Taeng	กู่สวนแตง	12	4,009
5.	Nong Yueang	หนองเยือง	9	4,718
