= Phutthaisong district =

Phutthaisong พุทไธสง
- Amphoe
- Amphoe location in Buriram province
- Coordinates: 15°32′54″N 103°1′30″E
- Country: Thailand
- Province: Buriram

Area
  - Total: 652.700 km^{2} (252.009 sq mi)

Population (2008)
  - Total: 46,367
  - Density: 157.9/km^{2} (409/sq mi)
- Time zone: UTC+7 (ICT)
- Postal code: 31120
- Geocode: 3109

Phutthaisong (Thai: พุทไธสง, pronounced [pʰút.tʰāj.sǒŋ]; Northeastern Thai: พุทไธสง, pronounced [pʰùt.tʰâj.sǒŋ]) is a district (amphoe) in the northern part of Buriram province, northeastern Thailand.

== Geography ==
Neighboring districts are (from the south clockwise) Khu Mueang of Buriram Province, Mueang Yang of Nakhon Ratchasima province, Ban Mai Chaiyaphot of Buriram, Nong Song Hong of Khon Kaen province, Na Pho of Buriram, Yang Sisurat and Phayakkhaphum Phisai of Maha Sarakham province, and Chumphon Buri of Surin province.

== Motto ==
The Phutthaisong District's Motto is "Ancient moat, worship Big buddha image, beautiful silk, Sra Bau lake so Shady."

== Administration ==
The district is divided into seven sub-districts (tambon), which are further subdivided into 97 villages (muban). Phutthaisong is a sub-district municipality (thesaban tambon) which covers parts of tambon Phutthaisong, Mafueang and Ban Chan. There are a further seven tambon administrative organizations (TAO).

No.	Name	Thai	Villages	Pop.
1.	Phutthaisong	พุทไธสง	13	8,624
2.	Mafueang	มะเฟือง	13	6,164
3.	Ban Chan	บ้านจาน	13	7,216
6.	Ban Pao	บ้านเป้า	12	5,610
7.	Ban Waeng	บ้านแวง	13	5,175
9.	Ban Yang	บ้านยาง	18	8,277
10.	Hai Sok	หายโศก	15	5,301

Missing numbers are tambon which now form Ban Mai Chaiyaphot district.
