= Chandi, Thailand =

Subdistrict municipality in Nakhon Si Thammarat province, Thailand

Chandi (Thai: จันดี, pronounced [t͡ɕān.dīː]) (Chinese: 曾理) is a sub-district municipality (Thesaban Tambon) in Chawang District of Nakhon Si Thammarat Province, southern Thailand in the middle of the Malay Peninsula. It is situated on the district border of Chang Klang, Na Bon and Thung Yai District.

Chandi is economically important for Chawang district, as the center of a commercial hub with transportation links to the neighboring districts and provinces. Chandi is the location of the Para Rubber Central Market in Nakhon Si Thammarat province.
