= Khlong Chandi railway station =

Railway station in Thailand

Coordinates: 8.3819°N 99.5400°E

Khlong Chandi คลองจันดี

General information
- Location: National Highway No. 4195, Chandi Subdistrict, Chawang District, Nakhon Si Thammarat
- Owner: State Railway of Thailand
- Line: Southern Line
- Platforms: 1
- Tracks: 3

Other information
- Station code: จด.

Services
Preceding station	State Railway of Thailand	Following station
Chawang towards Hua Lamphong or Krung Thep Aphiwat	Southern Line	Pho Than Klai Wachasit Halt towards Su-ngai Kolok
Location

Khlong Chandi railway station is a railway station located in Chandi Subdistrict, Chawang District, Nakhon Si Thammarat. It is a class 1 railway station located 727.953 km (452.3 mi) from Thon Buri railway station. This station is the alighting point for Lan Saka District, Chang Klang District, Phipun District and Nakhon Si Thammarat City (for passengers on trains not terminating at Nakhon Si Thammarat), continuing the journey by road transport.

== Train services ==
- Special Express No. 41/42 Bangkok-Yala-Bangkok
- Express No. 85/86 Bangkok-Nakhon Si Thammarat-Bangkok
- Rapid No. 167/168 Bangkok-Kantang-Bangkok
- Rapid No. 169/170 Bangkok-Yala-Bangkok
- Rapid No. 173/174 Bangkok-Nakhon Si Thammarat-Bangkok
- Local No. 445/446 Chumphon-Hat Yai Junction-Chumphon
- Local No. 447/448 Surat Thani-Sungai Kolok-Surat Thani
