= Khlong Se =

Khlong Se คลองเส
- Subdistrict
- Country: Thailand
- Province: Nakhon Si Thammarat
- District: Tham Phannara

Population (2017)
  - Total: 4,331
- Time zone: UTC+7 (ICT)
- Postal code: 80260
- TIS 1099: 801802

Khlong Se (Thai: คลองเส) is a tambon (subdistrict) of Tham Phannara District, in Nakhon Si Thammarat Province, Thailand. In 2017 it had a population of 4,331 people.

== History ==
The subdistrict was created effective 1 August 1986 by splitting off five administrative villages from Na Kacha. In 1990, it was one of two subdistricts which were split off from Chawang District and formed the new minor district Tham Phannara.

== Administration ==
=== Central administration ===
The tambon is divided into eight administrative villages (mubans).

No.	Name	Thai
1.	Ban Thung Chut	บ้านทุ่งจูด
2.	Ban Na Yaek Nuea	บ้านนาแยกเหนือ
3.	Ban Nong Yai	บ้านหนองใหญ่
4.	Ban Plai Se	บ้านปลายเส
5.	Ban Phraek Klang	บ้านแพรกกลาง
6.	Ban Dan Chang	บ้านด่านช้าง
7.	Ban Khlong Sai	บ้านคลองสาย
8.	Ban Na Yaek Tai	บ้านนาแยกใต้

=== Local administration ===
The whole area of the subdistrict is covered by the subdistrict administrative organization (SAO) Khlong Se (องค์การบริหารส่วนตำบลคลองเส).
