= Nopparat Keatkhamtorn =

Thai professional Muay Thai fighter

- Born: Nopparat Chumwong; April 11, 1983 (age 43); Thung Song, Nakhon Si Thammarat, Thailand
- Native name: นพรัตน์ ชุมวงค์
- Other names: Nopparat Kiatkamthorn
- Nickname: Lord Chest-Piercing Knee (ขุนเข่าปักอก)
- Height: 175 cm (5 ft 9 in)
- Division: Featherweight; Super Featherweight; Lightweight; Welterweight; Middleweight
- Style: Muay Thai (Muay Khao)
- Stance: Orthodox
- Team: Keathkhamtorn Gym (2001–Present); Petsiri Gym (1999–2001); Kiatbanchong Gym (1997–1999)
- Trainer: Anurak Wongsa
- Years active: c. 1991–2017

Other information
- Occupation: Muay Thai trainer

Nopparat Chumwong (Thai: นพรัตน์ ชุมวงค์; born April 11, 1983), known professionally as Nopparat Kiatkhamtorn (Thai: นพรัตน์ เกียรติกำธร), is a Thai former professional Muay Thai fighter. He is a former two-division Lumpinee Stadium champion. Nowadays he's the head coach at the Keatkhamtorn Gym in Bangkok.

== Biography and career ==
Nopparat started Muay Thai training at the age of 8 in his native Nakhon Si Thamnarat province. He trained at the Kiatbanchong and Petsiri gyms before joining the Keatkhamtorn Gym in Bangkok at the age of 18.

== Titles and accomplishments ==
- Lumpinee Stadium
  - 2004 Lumpinee Stadium Featherweight (126 lbs) Champion
  - 2006 Lumpinee Stadium Super Featherweight (130 lbs) Champion
    - One successful title defense
- Professional Boxing Association of Thailand (PAT)
  - 2006 Thailand Super Featherweight (130 lbs) Champion
- Isuzu Cup
  - 2011 Isuzu-Cup Runner-up
- Onesongchai
  - 2013 S-1 World -165 lbs Champion
- Tournaments
  - 2003 Toyota D4D Marathon Featherweight (126 lbs) Tournament Runner-up
  - 2006 Gaiyanghadao Lightweight (135 lbs) Tournament Runner-up
  - 2009 La Grande Sfida Sui 4 Angoli 8-man Tournament Winner
- World Kickboxing Network
  - 2009 W.K.N. World GP Big-8 Tournament Runner-up
- World Muaythai Organization
  - 2016 WMO World Middleweight (160 lbs) Champion

== Fight record ==
Professional Muaythai record
Date	Result	Opponent	Event	Location	Method	Round	Time
2017-02-18	Win	(Italy) Martin Meoni	Ring War	Monza, Italy	Decision	3	3:00
2016-02-06	Win	(Italy) Luca Tagliarino	Ring War 3	Assago, Italy	Decision	5	3:00
Wins WMO World -72kg title.
2014-01-25	Win	(Italy) Luca Tagliarino	Ring War	Assago, Italy	Decision	3	3:00
2013-12-05	Win	(France) Geoffrey Riviere	King's Birthday	Bangkok, Thailand	TKO (Doctor stoppage)	5	
Wins S1 World -165 lbs title.
2013-11-02	Loss	(Thailand) Danchonlek, MP Niyom	Siam Omnoi Stadium	Samut Sakhon, Thailand	TKO (referee stoppage)	4	
2013-01-		(Slovakia) Vladimir Konsky	MTE 18	Sassari, Italy	Decision	5	3:00
2012-11-24	Win	(Italy) Claudio Amoruso	Hearts on Fire Fight Night	Quartu Sant'Elena, Italy	KO	4	
2011-08-20	Win	(Thailand) Moses Tor.Sangtiennoi	Siam Omnoi Stadium	Samut Sakhon, Thailand	Decision	5	3:00
2011-06-11	Loss	(Thailand) Kem Sitsongpeenong	Isuzu Tournament Final, Omnoi Stadium	Samut Sakhon, Thailand	KO (Doctor stoppage/Elbow)	3	
For the 21st Isuzu Cup title.
2011-03-05	Win	(France) Antoine Pinto	Siam Omnoi Stadium - Isuzu Cup	Samut Sakhon, Thailand	Decision	5	3:00
2011-01-29	Win	(Thailand) Kongjak Sor Tuantong	Siam Omnoi Stadium - Isuzu Cup	Samut Sakhon, Thailand	TKO (referee stoppage)	4	
2010-12-25	Loss	(Thailand) Kem Sitsongpeenong	Siam Omnoi Stadium - Isuzu Cup	Samut Sakhon, Thailand	TKO (Ref. stop/right cross)	3	0:39
2010-12-04	Win	(France) Eric Renon	King's Birthday	Bangkok, Thailand	Decision	5	3:00
2010-10-16	Win	(Thailand) Moses Tor.Sangtiennoi	Siam Omnoi Stadium	Samut Sakhon, Thailand	Decision	5	3:00
2010-07-19	Win	(Thailand) Thepsutin Phumpanmuang	Kiatyongyut, Rajadamnern Stadium	Bangkok, Thailand	Decision	5	3:00
2010-01-16	Win	(France) Antoine Pinto	Thailand vs Challenger Series	Bangkok, Thailand	Decision (Split)	5	3:00
2009-09-12	Loss	(Belarus) Andrei Kulebin	W.K.N. World GP Big-8 Tournament '09, Final	Minsk, Belarus	Decision (Unanimous)	3	3:00
For the 2009 W.K.N. World Grand Prix Big-8 Tournament -66.7 kg title.
2009-09-12	Win		W.K.N. World GP Big-8 Tournament '09, Semi Finals	Minsk, Belarus			
2009-09-12	Win		W.K.N. World GP Big-8 Tournament '09, Quarter Finals	Minsk, Belarus			
2009-06-08	Loss	(Thailand) Bovy Sor Udomson	Suek Wansongchai, Rajadamnern Stadium	Bangkok, Thailand	Decision	5	3:00
2009-05-02	Win	(Thailand) Sak Kaoponlek	La Grande Sfida Sui 4 Angoli, Final	Rimini, Italy	TKO (Exhaustion)	2	
Wins Kombat League 2009 La Grande Sfida Sui 4 Angoli Tournament title.
2009-05-02	Win	(Italy) Elia Filipini	La Grande Sfida Sui 4 Angoli, Semi Final	Rimini, Italy	Decision	3	3:00
2009-05-02	Win	(France) Cédric Muller	La Grande Sfida Sui 4 Angoli, Quarter Final	Rimini, Italy	Ext.R Decision	4	3:00
2009-04-11	Win	(Thailand) Puja Sor.Suwanee		Phra Nakhon Si Ayutthaya, Thailand	Decision	5	3:00
2008-12-05	Loss	(Slovakia) Egon Racz	King's Birthday - S1 World Championship Semi Final	Bangkok, Thailand	KO (Right cross)		
2008-12-05	Win	(France) Christophe Mertens	King's Birthday - S1 World Championship Quarter Final	Bangkok, Thailand	Decision	3	3:00
2008-07-21	Win	(Thailand) Phetsanguan Sitniwat	Phettongkam, Rajadamnern Stadium	Bangkok, Thailand	Decision	5	3:00
2008-06-12	Loss	(Thailand) Kem Sitsongpeenong	Onesongchai, Rajaphat Institute	Nakhon Pathom, Thailand	Decision (Unanimous)	5	3:00
2008-05-05	Loss	(Thailand) Kem Sitsongpeenong		Bangkok, Thailand	KO	2	
2008-02-07	Win	(Thailand) Kem Sitsongpeenong	Wanthongchai, Rajadamnern Stadium	Bangkok, Thailand	Decision (Unanimous)	5	3:00
2007-11-24	Loss	(Thailand) Bovy Sor Udomson	Onesongchai Loi Krathong Superfights	Nonthaburi, Thailand	KO (Body punches)	3	
2007-08-30	Win	(Thailand) Saenchainoi Wor.Petchpoon	Rajadamnern Stadium	Bangkok, Thailand	Decision	5	3:00
2007-07-03	Win	(Thailand) Singdam Kiatmuu9	Petchpiya, Lumpinee Stadium	Bangkok, Thailand	Decision	5	3:00
2007-05-23	Win	(Thailand) Kem Sitsongpeenong	Sor.Sommai, Rajadamnern Stadium	Bangkok, Thailand	Decision	5	3:00
2006-11-17	Loss	(Thailand) Kongpipop Petchyindee	Gaiyanghadao Tournament, Final	Nakhon Ratchasima, Thailand	KO (Knees)	2	
For the Gaiyanghadao Lightweight (135 lbs) Tournament title.
2006-11-17	Win	(Thailand) Orono Wor Petchpun	Gaiyanghadao Tournament, Semi Final	Nakhon Ratchasima, Thailand	Decision	3	3:00
2006-11-17	Win	(Thailand) Saenchai Sor.Khamsing	Gaiyanghadao Tournament, Quarter Final	Nakhon Ratchasima, Thailand	Decision	3	3:00
2006-10-17	Loss	(Thailand) Attachai Fairtex	Petchpiya, Lumpinee Stadium	Bangkok, Thailand	KO	4	0:48
2006-08-11	Loss	(Thailand) Duangsompong Kor Sapaotong	Punpanmuang, Lumpinee Stadium	Bangkok, Thailand	Decision	5	3:00
2006-07-14	Win	(Thailand) Singdam Kiatmuu9	Jo Por Lor 7 + Petchpiya, Lumpinee Stadium	Bangkok, Thailand	Decision	5	3:00
Defends the Lumpinee Stadium Super Featherweight (130 lbs) Champion and captures the Thailand Super Featherweight (130 lbs) title.
2006-06-02	Win	(Thailand) Saenchai Sor.Khamsing	Lumpinee Champion Krirkkrai, Lumpinee Stadium	Bangkok, Thailand	Decision	5	3:00
Wins the Lumpinee Stadium Super Featherweight (130 lbs) title.
2006-04-25	Draw	(Thailand) Saenchai Sor.Khamsing	Petchpiya, Lumpinee Stadium	Bangkok, Thailand	Decision	5	3:00
2006-02-22	Win	(Thailand) Saenchai Sor.Khamsing	Meenayothin, Rajadamnern Stadium	Bangkok, Thailand	Decision	5	3:00
2006-01-17	Draw	(Thailand) Saenchai Sor.Khamsing	Petchyindee, Lumpinee Stadium	Bangkok, Thailand	Decision	5	3:00
For the Lumpinee Stadium Super Featherweight (130 lbs) title.
2005-12-20	Win	(Thailand) Attachai Fairtex	Wanboonya, Lumpinee Stadium	Bangkok, Thailand	Decision	5	3:00
2005-10-21	Loss	(Thailand) Singdam Kiatmuu9	Lumpinee Champion Krikkrai, Lumpinee Stadium	Bangkok, Thailand	Decision	5	3:00
2005-09-27	Win	(Thailand) Saenchai Sor.Khamsing	Wanboonya, Lumpinee Stadium	Bangkok, Thailand	Decision	5	3:00
2005-08-31	Win	(Thailand) Singdam Kiatmuu9	Palangnoom, Rajadamnern Stadium	Bangkok, Thailand	Decision	5	3:00
2005-07-29	NC	(Thailand) Sagatpetch Sor.Sakulpan	Petchpiya, Lumpinee Stadium	Bangkok, Thailand	Ref.stop (Nopparat dismissed)	5	
2005-06-17	Loss	(Thailand) Kongpipop Petchyindee	Wanboonya, Lumpinee Stadium	Bangkok, Thailand	KO	2	
2005-05-06	Loss	(Thailand) Anuwat Kaewsamrit	Petchyindee + Kor.Sapaotong, Lumpinee Stadium	Bangkok, Thailand	TKO	1	
Loses the Lumpinee Stadium Featherweight (126 lbs) title and fails to capture the Rajadamnern Stadium Featherweight (126 lbs) title.
2005-03-18	Win	(Thailand) Orono Wor Petchpun	Petchyindee + Sapaotong, Lumpinee Stadium	Bangkok, Thailand	Decision	5	3:00
2005-01-04	Loss	(Thailand) Singdam Kiatmuu9	Petchyindee, Lumpinee Stadium	Bangkok, Thailand	Decision	5	3:00
2004-12-07	Win	(Thailand) Kongpipop Petchyindee	Lumpinee Stadium Birthday Show	Bangkok, Thailand	Decision	5	3:00
Wins the Lumpinee Stadium Featherweight (126 lbs) title.
2004-11-04	Win	(Thailand) Lerdsila Chumpairtour	Daorungchujarean, Rajadamnern Stadium	Bangkok, Thailand	Decision	5	3:00
2004-09-28	Loss	(Thailand) Sibmuen Laemthongphaet	Petchyindee + Weerapol, Lumpinee Stadium	Bangkok, Thailand	Decision	5	3:00
2004-08-10	Win	(Thailand) Yodteera Sityodthong	Petchyindee, Lumpinee Stadium	Bangkok, Thailand	Decision	5	3:00
2004-07-20	Win	(Thailand) Sailom Rachanon	Petchyindee, Lumpinee Stadium	Bangkok, Thailand	Decision	5	3:00
2004-05-28	Win	(Thailand) Saengarthit Sasiprapagym	Petchyindee, Lumpinee Stadium	Bangkok, Thailand	Decision	5	3:00
2003-11-15	Loss	(Thailand) Yodsanklai Fairtex	Lumpinee Krikkai, Lumpinee Stadium	Bangkok, Thailand	Decision	5	3:00
2003-	Win	(Thailand) Wanmeechai Meenayothin	Lumpinee Stadium	Bangkok, Thailand	Decision	5	3:00
2003-07-29	Loss	(Thailand) Anuwat Kaewsamrit	DFD CommonReal3000 + Petchyindee, Lumpinee Stadium	Bangkok, Thailand	TKO	1	
2003-03-28	Loss	(Thailand) Yodsanklai Fairtex	Lumpinee Stadium - Toyota Marathon, Final	Bangkok, Thailand	KO (Uppercut)	3	
For the Toyota Marathon Featherweight (126 lbs) Tournament title.
2003-01-07	Win	(Thailand) Kaew Fairtex	Lumpinee Stadium	Bangkok, Thailand	Decision	5	3:00
2002-12-03	Win	(Thailand) Sitthichai Kiyarat	Lumpinee Stadium	Bangkok, Thailand	Decision	5	3:00
2002-05-03	Win	(Thailand) Chaowalit Sit-O	Lumpinee Stadium	Bangkok, Thailand	Decision	5	3:00
2002-	Win	(Thailand) Rungrawee Kor.Sakphadungkit	Lumpinee Stadium	Bangkok, Thailand	Decision	5	3:00
2002-	Loss	(Thailand) Chaowalit Sit-O	Lumpinee Stadium	Bangkok, Thailand	Decision	5	3:00
2002-	Win	(Thailand) Worawut Fairtex	Lumpinee Stadium	Bangkok, Thailand	Decision	5	3:00
2002-	Win	(Thailand) Hongthongnoi Kor.Kalpitan	Lumpinee Stadium	Bangkok, Thailand	Decision	5	3:00
Legend: Win Loss Draw/No contest Notes
