= Chawang railway station =

Railway station in Thailand

Coordinates: 8.4206°N 99.5084°E

Chawang ฉวาง

General information
- Location: Chonprawet Road, Chawang Subdistrict, Chawang District, Nakhon Si Thammarat
- Owner: State Railway of Thailand
- Line: Southern Line
- Platforms: 1
- Tracks: 2

Other information
- Station code: ฉว.

Services
Preceding station	State Railway of Thailand	Following station
Than Pho towards Hua Lamphong or Krung Thep Aphiwat	Southern Line	Khlong Chandi towards Su-ngai Kolok
Location

Chawang station (Thai: สถานีฉวาง) is a railway station located in Chawang Subdistrict, Chawang District, Nakhon Si Thammarat. It is a class 2 railway station located 722.417 km (448.9 mi) from Thon Buri railway station.

== Train services ==
- Express No. 85/86 Bangkok-Nakhon Si Thammarat-Bangkok
- Rapid No. 167/168 Bangkok-Kantang-Bangkok
- Rapid No. 169/170 Bangkok-Yala-Bangkok
- Rapid No. 173/174 Bangkok-Nakhon Si Thammarat-Bangkok
- Local No. 445/446 Chumphon-Hat Yai Junction-Chumphon
- Local No. 447/448 Surat Thani-Sungai Kolok-Surat Thani
