= Dusit subdistrict, Nakhon Si Thammarat =

Dusit ดุสิต
- Subdistrict
- Country: Thailand
- Province: Nakhon Si Thammarat
- District: Tham Phannara

Population (2017)
  - Total: 7,051
- Time zone: UTC+7 (ICT)
- Postal code: 80260
- TIS 1099: 801803

Dusit (Thai: ดุสิต) is a tambon (subdistrict) of Tham Phannara District, in Nakhon Si Thammarat Province, Thailand. In 2017 it had a population of 7,051 people.

== History ==
The subdistrict was created on 1 July 1990 by splitting off five administrative villages from Tham Phannara.

== Administration ==
=== Central administration ===
The tambon is divided into 11 administrative villages (mubans).

No.	Name	Thai
1.	Ban Ko Khwan	บ้านเกาะขวัญ
2.	Ban Chanuan Chan	บ้านฉนวนจันทร์
3.	Ban Khlong Le	บ้านคลองเล
4.	Ban Thung Nong Khwai	บ้านทุ่งหนองควาย
5.	Ban Wang Ri	บ้านวังรี
6.	Ban Suan Phikun	บ้านสวนพิกุล
7.	Ban Khlong Ka	บ้านคลองกา
8.	Ban Khuan Champa	บ้านควนจำปา
9.	Ban Phruang	บ้านพรุวง
10.	Ban Huai Sai Khao	บ้านห้วยทรายขาว
11.	Ban Laem Din	บ้านแหลมดิน

=== Local administration ===
The whole area of the subdistrict is covered by the subdistrict administrative organization (SAO) Dusit (องค์การบริหารส่วนตำบลดุสิต).
