= Khlong Thom =

Khlong Thom may refer to:

- Khlong Thom, Bangkok (คลองถม, pronounced [kʰlɔ̄ːŋ.tʰǒm]), a neighbourhood in Bangkok
- Khlong Thom District (คลองท่อม, pronounced [kʰlɔ̄ːŋ.tʰɔ̂m]) in Krabi Province
