= ONE Friday Fights 5 =

Combat sport events in 2023

ONE Friday Fights 5: Kongklai vs. Superball
- Promotion: ONE Championship
- Date: February 17, 2023
- Venue: Lumpinee Boxing Stadium
- City: Bangkok, Thailand

Event chronology
ONE Friday Fights 4: Duangsompong vs. Batman	ONE Friday Fights 5: Kongklai vs. Superball	ONE Friday Fights 6: Gingsanglek vs. Kongthoranee

ONE Friday Fights 5: Kongklai vs. Superball (also known as ONE Lumpinee 5) was a combat sport event produced by ONE Championship that took place on February 17, 2023, at Lumpinee Boxing Stadium in Bangkok, Thailand.

== Background ==
The first six bout card live on FanDuel TV, was headlined by a 154 pounds catchweight muay thai bout between Revo Sor.Sommai vs. Furkan Karabağ. The second six bout card live on YouTube and Facebook: ONE Championship, headlined by a 138 pounds catchweight muay thai bout between Kongklai AnnyMuayThai vs. Superball Tded99.

== Results ==
Main card (YouTube / Facebook)
Weight class				Method	Round	Time	Notes
Flyweight Muay Thai	Superball Tded99	def.	Kongklai AnnyMuayThai	Decision (unanimous)	3	3:00
Catchweight (130 lbs) Muay Thai	Denkriangkrai Singha Mawynn	def.	Songchana Tor.Brucelee	Decision (split)	3	3:00
Flyweight Muay Thai	Namphongnoi Sor.Sommai	def.	Ploypanlan P.K.Saenchai	KO (punch)	1	0:57
Strawweight Muay Thai	Teeyai P.K.Saenchai	def.	Jelte Blommaert	TKO (retirement)	1	3:00
Catchweight (132 lbs) Muay Thai	Iony Lawrence	def.	Ploymuangjan SmileMuayThai	TKO (punches)	1	1:58
Catchweight (112 lbs) Muay Thai	Khunsuk Sor.Dechapan	def.	Yodbuangarm Luckybuntherng	KO (punches)	2	0:52
Preliminary card (FanDuel TV)
Catchweight (154 lbs) Muay Thai	Furkan Karabağ	def.	Revo Sor.Sommai	TKO (leg kick)	3	0:37
Flyweight	Fritz Biagtan	def.	Nurmukhammad Adamkhonov	KO (punch)	3	4:56
Women's Strawweight	Aleksandra Savicheva	def.	Zeba Bano	TKO (punches)	1	3:39
Flyweight Muay Thai	Dedduanglek Tded99	def.	Temirlan Bekmurzaev	Decision (unanimous)	3	3:00
Catchweight (130 lbs) Muay Thai	Hannah Brady	def.	Claire Rankine	KO (punches)	1	2:07
Women's Atomweight	Chihiro Sawada	def.	Sanaz Fayazmanesh	Submission (americana)	2	0:53

== Bonus awards ==
The following fighters received $10,000 bonuses.

- Performance of the Night: Superball Tded99, Kongklai AnnyMuayThai, Namphongnoi Sor.Sommai, Teeyai P.K.Saenchai, Khunsuk Sor.Dechapan and Furkan Karabağ

== See also ==
- 2023 in ONE Championship
- List of ONE Championship events
- List of current ONE fighters
