= Tham Hua Kalok =

Cave in Thailand

Coordinates: 8°22′39″N 98°43′18″E

Tham Hua Kalok (Thai: ถ้ำหัวกะโหลก, literally Skull Cave, also named Tham Phi Hua To ถ้ำผีหัวโต) is a cave in Ao Luek District near Phang Nga Bay in southern Thailand. The cave contains prehistoric paintings in black and red pigment of humans and strange animals. The cave is in Than Bok Khorani National Park.

== See also ==
- List of caves
- Speleology
