= Khao Phanom district =

Khao Phanom เขาพนม
- District
- District location in Krabi province
- Coordinates: 8°15′53″N 99°2′57″E
- Country: Thailand
- Province: Krabi
- Seat: Khao Phanom

Area
  - Total: 788.522 km^{2} (304.450 sq mi)

Population (2548)
  - Total: 45,982
  - Density: 58.3/km^{2} (151/sq mi)
- Time zone: UTC+7 (ICT)
- Postal code: 81140
- Geocode: 8102

Khao Phanom (Thai: เขาพนม, pronounced [kʰǎw pʰā.nōm]) is a district (amphoe) in Krabi province, Thailand.

== History ==
The minor district (king amphoe) was created on 1 December 1967 by combining tambons Khao Phanom, Khao Din, and two villages of Khok Yang of Mueang Krabi district and tambon Sin Pun from Khlong Thom district. It was upgraded to a full district on 29 June 1973.

== Geography ==
Neighboring districts are (from the north clockwise): Chai Buri and Phrasaeng of Surat Thani province; Thung Yai of Nakhon Si Thammarat province; and Lam Thap, Khlong Thom, Nuea Khlong, Mueang Krabi, Ao Luek, and Plai Phraya of Krabi Province.

The Khao Phanom Bencha National Park protects the forests around Phanom Bencha mountain, which at 1,397 m is the highest elevation in Krabi Province.

== Administration ==
The district is divided into six subdistricts (tambons), which are further subdivided into 54 villages (mubans). Khao Phanom is a township (thesaban tambon) which covers parts of tambon Khao Phanom. Each tambon has a tambon administrative organization (TAO).

No.	Name	Thai name	Villages	Pop.
1.	Khao Phanom	เขาพนม	10	9,774
2.	Khao Din	เขาดิน	9	7,553
3.	Sin Pun	สินปุน	10	7,751
4.	Phru Tiao	พรุเตียว	10	7,854
5.	Na Khao	หน้าเขา	8	8,024
6.	Khok Han	โคกหาร	7	5,026

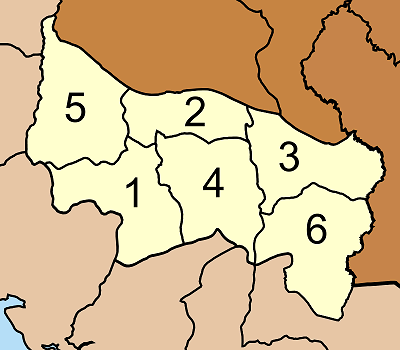
