= Phanom district =

Phanom พนม
- District
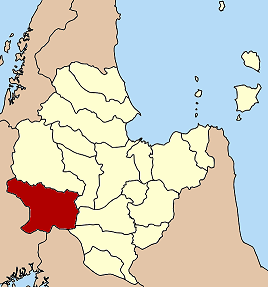
- District location in Surat Thani province
- Coordinates: 8°51′18″N 98°48′48″E
- Country: Thailand
- Province: Surat Thani
- Seat: Phanom

Area
  - Total: 707.6 km^{2} (273.2 sq mi)

Population (2005)
  - Total: 33,513
  - Density: 47.4/km^{2} (123/sq mi)
- Time zone: UTC+7 (ICT)
- Postal code: 84250
- Geocode: 8410

Phanom (Thai: พนม, pronounced [pʰā.nōm]) is a district (amphoe) in the southwest of Surat Thani province of southern Thailand.

== Geography ==
The district is in the hills of the Phuket mountain range, with around 60 percent of its area consisting of mountains and forests. The northwestern part of the district is protected in the Khao Sok National Park, in the southwest by the Khlong Phanom National Park. The district marks the eastern end of the pass through the mountains, connecting Takua Pa with Surat Thani. This historic pass along the Sok River valley is now the route of Thailand Route 401.

Neighboring districts are (from north clockwise): Ban Ta Khun, Khiri Rat Nikhom, Khian Sa and Phrasaeng of Surat Thani: Plai Phraya of Krabi province: Thap Put, Mueang Phang Nga, Kapong, Takua Pa and Khura Buri of Phang Nga province.

== History ==
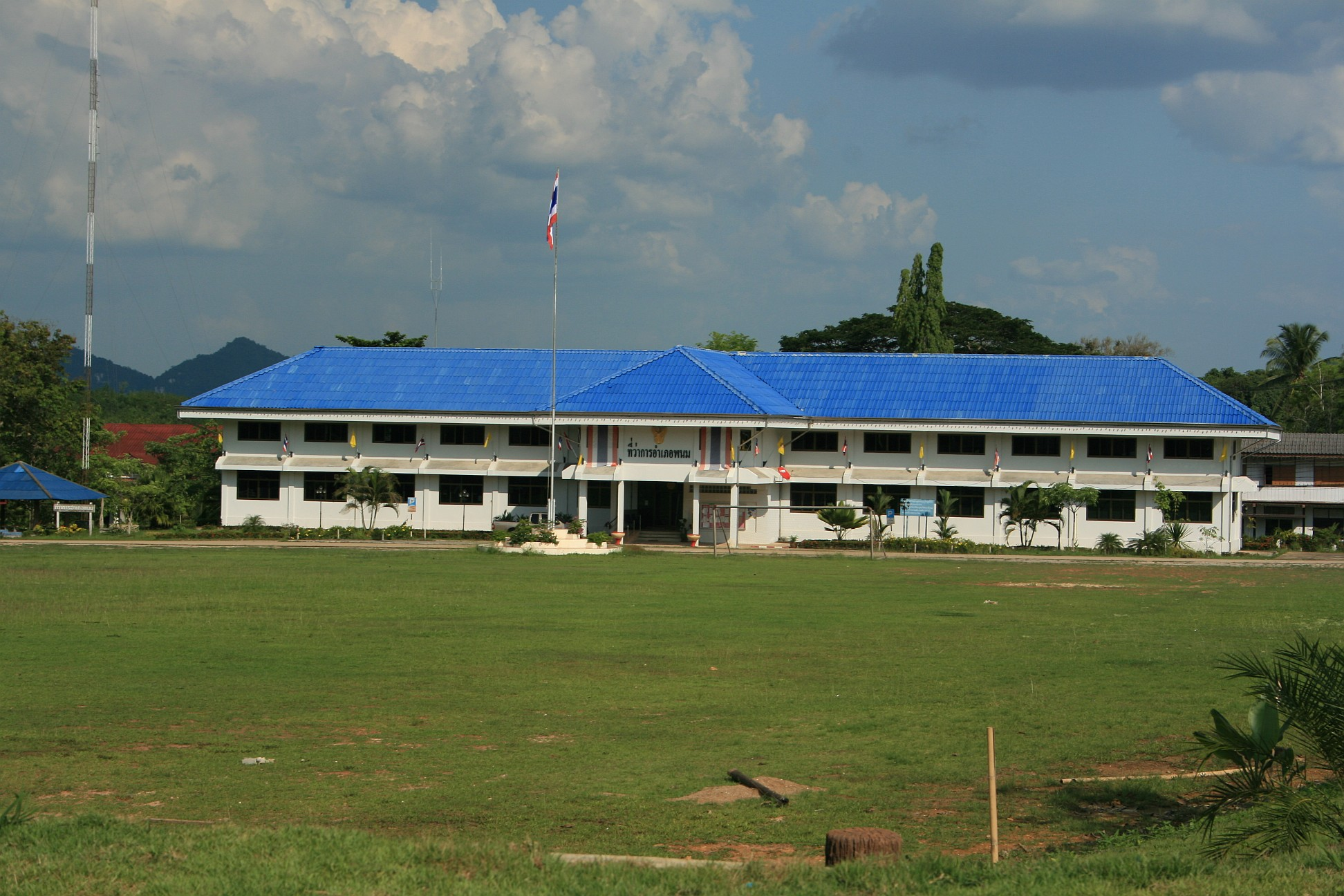
District office

The district was created in 1890, at that time named Khlong Cha Un (คลองชะอุ่น). It was later renamed to Pak Phanom (ปากพนม), as the district office was moved to a new site in Phak Phanom, which was then shortened to simply Phanom. The first district officer was Khun Phanom Thana Rak. In 1910 the district was reduced to a minor district (king amphoe) and made a subordinate of Khirirat Nikhom District. On 14 November 1971 it regained full district status.

== Symbols ==
The slogan of the district is "Beautiful Rafflesia, rich in hills covered by mist".

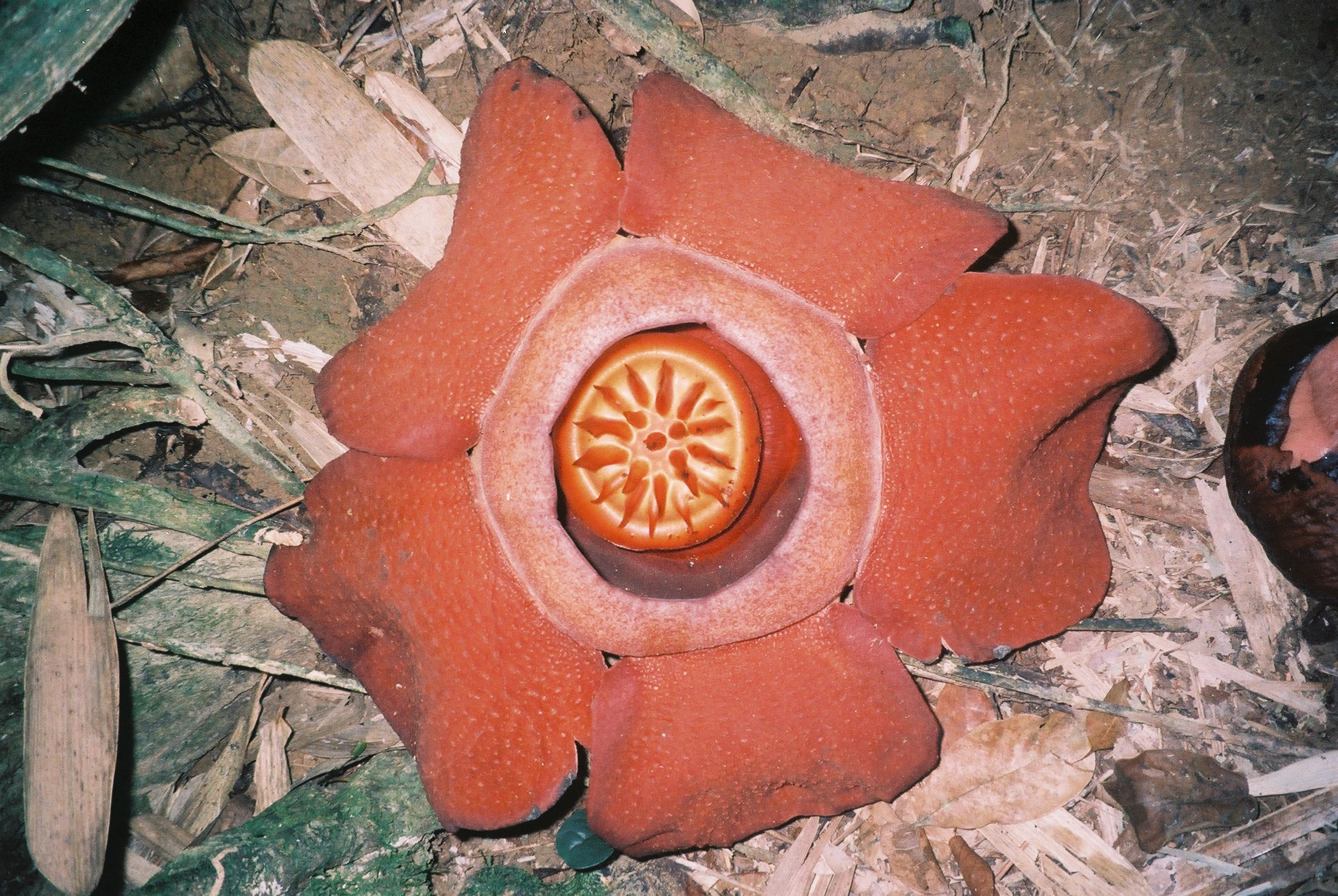
Rafflesia

Rafflesia flowers can be found in Khao Sok National Park in Phanom district.

== Administration ==
The district is divided into six sub-districts (tambons), which are further subdivided into 56 villages (mubans). Phanom itself has a township (thesaban tambon) status and covers tambon Phang Kan and parts of tambon Phanom. Each of the six tambon is administered by a tambon administrative organization (TAO).

No.	Name	Thai name	Villages	Pop.
1.	Phanom	พนม	13	6,134
2.	Ton Yuan	ต้นยวน	12	8,255
3.	Khlong Sok	คลองศก	8	5,564
4.	Phlu Thuean	พลูเถื่อน	5	2,247
5.	Phang Kan	พังกาญจน์	5	2,530
6.	Khlong Cha-un	คลองชะอุ่น	13	8,783

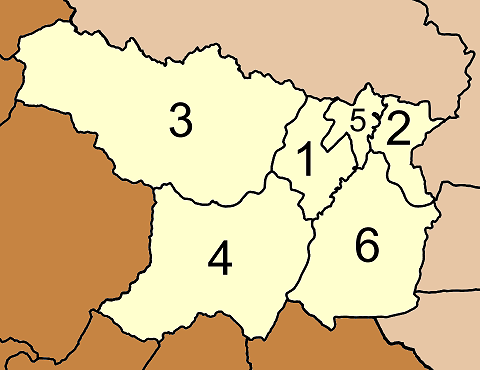
Map of subdistricts
