= Superball Tded99 =

Muay Thai fighter

- Born: Weerasak Tharakhajad; October 27, 1996 (age 29); Nong Bua Lamphu Province, Thailand
- Other names: Superball Teemuangloei; Superball Or.Pimonsri (ซุปเปอร์บอล อ.พิมลศรี)
- Nationality: Thai
- Height: 173 cm (5 ft 8 in)
- Weight: 61 kg (134 lb; 9.6 st)
- Style: Muay Khao
- Fighting out of: Bangkok, Thailand
- Team: Tded99 WankhongohmMBK

Superball Tded99 (Thai: ซุปเปอร์บอล ทีเด็ด99) is a Muay Thai fighter.

== Titles and accomplishments ==
- Professional Boxing Association of Thailand (PAT)
  - 2014 Thailand 122 lbs Champion
- International Federation of Muaythai Associations
  - 2021 IFMA World Championships -63.5 kg (gold)
- World Games
  - 2022 IFMA Muay Thai at the World Games -63.5 kg (silver)

== Fight record ==
Date	Result	Opponent	Event	Location	Method	Round	Time
2025-07-18	Win	(Russia) Ibragim Abdulmedzhidov	ONE Friday Fights 116, Lumpinee Stadium	Bangkok, Thailand	TKO (Doctor stoppage)	2	3:00
2024-10-18	Loss	(Thailand) Panrit Lukjaomaesaiwaree	ONE Friday Fights 83, Lumpinee Stadium	Bangkok, Thailand	KO (Right cross)	2	0:57
2024-07-19	Loss	(Russia) Ilyas Musaev	ONE Friday Fights 71, Lumpinee Stadium	Bangkok, Thailand	KO (Punches)	2	0:55
2023-11-14	Loss	(Japan) Hiroki Kasahara	SHOOT BOXING 2023 Series Final	Tokyo, Japan	KO (Left hook)	1	3:00
2023-10-06	Win	(Brazil) Julio Lobo	ONE Friday Fights 36, Lumpinee Stadium	Bangkok, Thailand	Decision (Unanimous)	3	3:00
2023-05-12	Loss	(Thailand) Rangkhao Wor.Sangprapai	Muay Thai Lumpinee Pitaktam	Songkhla province, Thailand	KO (Elbows)	3	
2023-03-31	Win	(Thailand) Kongklai AnnyMuayThai	ONE Friday Fights 11, Lumpinee Stadium	Bangkok, Thailand	Decision (Unanimous)	3	3:00
2023-02-17	Win	(Thailand) Kongklai AnnyMuayThai	ONE Friday Fights 5, Lumpinee Stadium	Bangkok, Thailand	Decision (Unanimous)	3	3:00
2023-01-09	Win	(Thailand) PhetUtong Or.Kwanmuang	Muay Thai Pantamit	Chiang Rai province, Thailand	KO (Low kicks)	3	
2022-05-12	Win	(Thailand) Rungkit Wor.Sanprapai	Petchyindee, Rajadamnern Stadium	Bangkok, Thailand	Decision	5	3:00
2022-04-07	Loss	(Thailand) Superlek Kiatmuu9	Petchyindee, Rajadamnern Stadium	Bangkok, Thailand	Decision (Unanimous)	5	3:00
For the vacant True4U 140 lbs title.
2021-12-30	Win	(Thailand) Rungkit Wor.Sanprapai	Muay Thai SAT Super Fight WiteetinThai	Phuket, Thailand	Decision	5	3:00
2021-03-13	Win	(Thailand) Rangkhao Wor.Sangprapai	Majujaya Muay Thai, Temporary Outdoors Stadium	Pattani, Thailand	KO (left hook)	4	
2020-11-07	Win	(Thailand) Kaonar P.K. Saenchai Muaythaigym	SAT HERO SERIES, World Siam Stadium	Bangkok, Thailand	Decision	5	3:00
2020-10-03	Win	(Thailand) Phet Utong Or. Kwanmuang	Omnoi Stadium	Samut Sakhon, Thailand	Decision	5	3:00
2020-01-31	Draw	(Thailand) Mongkolpetch Petchyindee	Phuket Super Fight Real Muay Thai	Mueang Phuket District, Thailand	Decision	5	3:00
2019-12-23	Loss	(Thailand) Superlek Kiatmuu9	Rajadamnern 74th Anniversary, Rajadamnern Stadium	Bangkok, Thailand	Decision (Unanimous)	5	3:00
2019-11-07	Win	(Thailand) Yamin PK.Saenchaimuaythaigym	Rajadamnern Stadium	Bangkok, Thailand	Decision	5	3:00
2019-09-02	Win	(Thailand) Yamin PK.Saenchaimuaythaigym	Rajadamnern Stadium	Bangkok, Thailand	KO (Left Straight)	2	
2019-05-30	Loss	(Thailand) Yamin PK.Saenchaimuaythaigym	Rajadamnern Stadium	Bangkok, Thailand	KO (Right High kick)	2	
2019-04-25	Loss	(Thailand) Kaonar P.K.SaenchaiMuaythaiGym	Rajadamnern Stadium	Bangkok, Thailand	Decision	5	3:00
2019-02-07	Win	(Thailand) Phet Utong Or. Kwanmuang	Rajadamnern Stadium	Bangkok, Thailand	Decision	5	3:00
2018-12-21	Win	(Thailand) Phet Utong Or. Kwanmuang	Rajadamnern Stadium	Bangkok, Thailand	Decision	5	3:00
2018-11-29	Win	(Thailand) Phet Utong Or. Kwanmuang	Rajadamnern Stadium	Bangkok, Thailand	Decision	5	3:00
2018-11-07	Loss	(Thailand) Kaonar P.K.SaenchaiMuaythaiGym	Rajadamnern Stadium	Bangkok, Thailand	Decision	5	3:00
2018-10-04	Win	(Thailand) Yamin PK.Saenchaimuaythaigym	Rajadamnern Stadium	Bangkok, Thailand	Decision	5	3:00
2018-05-23	Win	(Thailand) Yok Parunchai	Rajadamnern Stadium	Bangkok, Thailand	Decision	5	3:00
2016-12-22	Loss	(Thailand) Kaimukkao Por.Thairongruangkamai	Rajadamnern Stadium	Bangkok, Thailand	KO (Right High Kick)	4	
2016-11-17	Win	(Thailand) Extra Sitworaphat	Rajadamnern Stadium	Bangkok, Thailand	Decision	5	3:00
2016-09-29	Loss	(Thailand) Bangpleenoi 96Penang	Rajadamnern Stadium	Bangkok, Thailand	Decision	5	3:00
2016-08-29	Win	(Thailand) Jompichit Chuwattana	Rajadamnern Stadium	Bangkok, Thailand	Decision	5	3:00
2016-06-27	Win	(Thailand) Jompichit Chuwattana	Rajadamnern Stadium	Bangkok, Thailand	Decision	5	3:00
2016-05-30	Win	(Thailand) Jemsak Buriram	Rajadamnern Stadium	Bangkok, Thailand	Decision	5	3:00
2016-04-07	Loss	(Thailand) Superlek Kiatmuu9	Rajadamnern Stadium	Bangkok, Thailand	TKO (Low Kicks)	3	1:40
2016-03-07	Win	(Thailand) Phetngam Kiatkamphon	Rajadamnern Stadium	Bangkok, Thailand	Decision	5	3:00
2015-11-29	Loss	(Thailand) Phetsongkom Sitjaroensub		Chachoengsao Province, Thailand	Decision	5	3:00
2015-11-08	Win	(Thailand) Sit Ek Aor.Bualerd	Rangsit Stadium	Thailand	Decision	5	3:00
2015-09-27	Win	(Thailand) Wanchana Aor.Boonchuay	Rangsit Stadium	Thailand	Decision	5	3:00
2015-08-23	Loss	(Thailand) Klasuek Phetjinda	Rangsit Stadium	Thailand	KO	3	
2015-07-26	Win	(Thailand) Palangthip Nor Sripheung	Ubon Ratchathani Boxing Stadium	Ubon Ratchathani, Thailand	Decision	5	3:00
2015-05-13	Win	(Thailand) Sit Ek Aor.Bualerd	Rajadamnern Stadium	Bangkok, Thailand	Decision	5	3:00
2015-04-02	Loss	(Thailand) Songkom Sakhomsin	Rajadamnern Stadium	Bangkok, Thailand	Decision	5	3:00
2015-03-06	Win	(Thailand) Kotchasan Wor.Wiwattananont	Lumpinee Stadium	Bangkok, Thailand	Decision	5	3:00
2015-01-26	Win	(Thailand) Paaeteng Kiatpolthip	Rajadamnern Stadium	Bangkok, Thailand	Decision	5	3:00
2015-01-04	Win	(Thailand) Songkom Sakhomsin	Rangsit Stadium	Thailand	Decision	5	3:00
2014-11-17	Loss	(Thailand) Detsakda Phukongyatsuepudomsuk	Rajadamnern Stadium	Bangkok, Thailand	Decision	5	3:00
2014-10-09	Loss	(Thailand) Surachai Nayoksanya	Rajadamnern Stadium	Bangkok, Thailand	KO	4	
2014-07-15	Win	(Thailand) Thong Puideenaidee	Lumpinee Stadium	Bangkok, Thailand	Decision	5	3:00
2014-06-24	Win	(Thailand) Bangpleenoi 96Penang	Lumpinee Stadium	Bangkok, Thailand	TKO (Knees)	3	
2014-05-06	Loss	(Thailand) Bangpleenoi 96Penang	Lumpinee Stadium	Bangkok, Thailand	Decision	5	3:00
2014-04-11	Win	(Thailand) Choknumchai Sitjakong	Rajadamnern Stadium	Bangkok, Thailand	KO (Left Hook)	2	
Wins Thailand 122 lbs title.
2014-03-11	Win	(Thailand) Wanchana Aor.Boonchuay	Lumpinee Stadium	Bangkok, Thailand	Decision	5	3:00
2014-02-04	Loss	(Thailand) Eakmongkol Kaiyanghadaogym	Rajadamnern Stadium	Bangkok, Thailand	KO (Sweep to head kick)	4	
2014-01-07	Loss	(Thailand) Teeyai Kiatchongkao	Rajadamnern Stadium	Bangkok, Thailand	Decision	5	3:00
Legend: Win Loss Draw/No contest Notes

Amateur Muay Thai Record (Incomplete)
Date	Result	Opponent	Event	Location	Method	Round	Time
2024-06-03	Loss	(France) Nassim Ben Faleh	IFMA 2024 World Championships, First Round	Patras, Greece	Decision (30:28)	3	3:00
2022-07-17	Loss	(Ukraine) Igor Liubchenko	IFMA at the 2022 World Games, Final	Birmingham, Alabama, United States	Decision (29:29)	3	3:00
Wins 2022 World Games -63.5kg Silver Medal.
2022-07-16	Win	(United Arab Emirates) Nouredine Samir	IFMA at the 2022 World Games, Semi Finals	Birmingham, Alabama, United States	Decision (29:28)	3	3:00
2022-07-15	Win	(Slovakia) Lukas Mandinec	IFMA at the 2022 World Games, Quarter Finals	Birmingham, Alabama, United States	Decision (30:26)	3	3:00
2021-12-11	Win	(Ukraine) Igor Liubchenko	2021 IFMA World Championships, Final	Bangkok, Thailand	Decision	3	
Wins 2021 IFMA World Championships -63.5kg Gold Medal.
2021-12-10	Win	(Russia) Aik Begian	2021 IFMA World Championships, Semi Finals	Bangkok, Thailand	Decision	3	
2021-12-09	Win	(Italy) Lorenzo Rossetti	2021 IFMA World Championships, Quarter Finals	Bangkok, Thailand	Decision	3	
2021-12-08	Win	(Hungary) László István Kurdy	2021 IFMA World Championships, Round 2	Bangkok, Thailand	KO		
Legend: Win Loss Draw/No contest Notes
