= Lam Thap district =

Lam Thap ลำทับ
- District
- District location in Krabi province
- Coordinates: 8°4′18″N 99°17′30″E
- Country: Thailand
- Province: Krabi
- Seat: Lam Thap

Area
  - Total: 320.708 km^{2} (123.826 sq mi)

Population (2005)
  - Total: 20,069
  - Density: 62.6/km^{2} (162/sq mi)
- Time zone: UTC+7 (ICT)
- Postal code: 81190
- Geocode: 8107

Lam Thap (Thai: ลำทับ, pronounced [lām tʰáp]) is a district (amphoe) of Krabi province, southern Thailand.

== History ==
The minor district (king amphoe) Lam Thap was established on 30 June 1984, when the two tambons Lam Thap and Din Udom were split off from Khlong Thom district. It was upgraded to a full district on 4 November 1993.

== Geography ==
Neighboring districts are (from the west clockwise): Khlong Thom and Khao Phanom of Krabi Province; Thung Yai and Bang Khan of Nakhon Si Thammarat province; and Wang Wiset of Trang province.

== Administration ==
The district is divided into four sub-districts (tambons), which are further subdivided into 27 villages (mubans). Lam Thap is a township (thesaban tambon) and covers parts of tambons Lam Thap and Thung Sai Thong. There are a further four tambon administrative organizations (TAO).

No.	Name	Thai	Villages	Pop.
1.	Lam Thap	ลำทับ	10	7,493
2.	Din Udom	ดินอุดม	6	5,107
3.	Thung Sai Thong	ทุ่งไทรทอง	5	4,312
4.	Din Daeng	ดินแดง	6	3,157

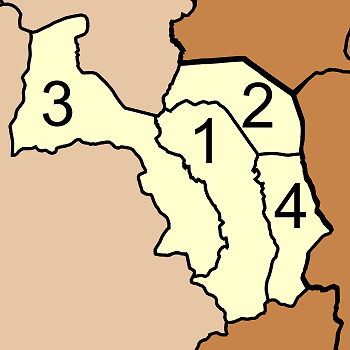
