= Thap Put district =

Thap Phut ทับปุด
- District
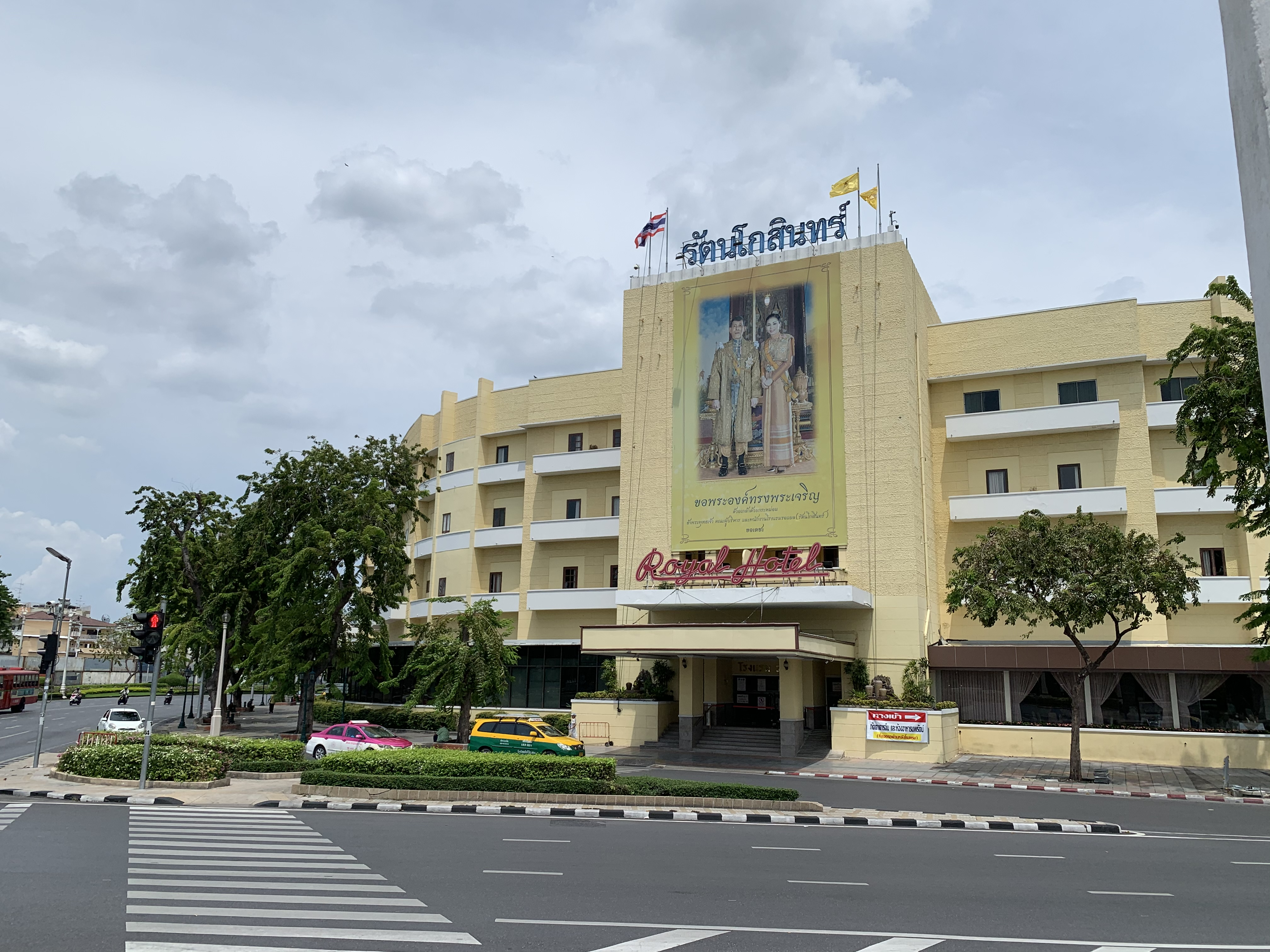

- District location in Phang Nga province
- Coordinates: 8°30′58″N 98°38′23″E
- Country: Thailand
- Province: Phang Nga
- Seat: Thap Phut

Area
  - Total: 272.429 km^{2} (105.185 sq mi)

Population (6 November 2002)
  - Total: 24,046
  - Density: 88.3/km^{2} (229/sq mi)
- Time zone: UTC+7 (ICT)
- Postal code: 82180
- Geocode: 8207

Thap Phut (Thai: ทับปุด, pronounced [tʰáp pùt]) is a district (amphoe) in Phang Nga province in the south of Thailand.

== History ==
In 1785 Burmese troops attacked Mueang Thalang. The inhabitants escaped from Thalang to the area of modern-day Thap Put. They built shelters that in the southern Thai language are called thap. The shelters were covered by tree leaves which are called put.

The district was established in 1897 as one of the original districts of Phang Nga Province.

== Geography ==
Neighboring districts are (from the west clockwise): Mueang Phang Nga of Phang Nga; Phanom of Surat Thani province; and Plai Phraya and Ao Luek of Krabi province. To the south is Phang Nga Bay.

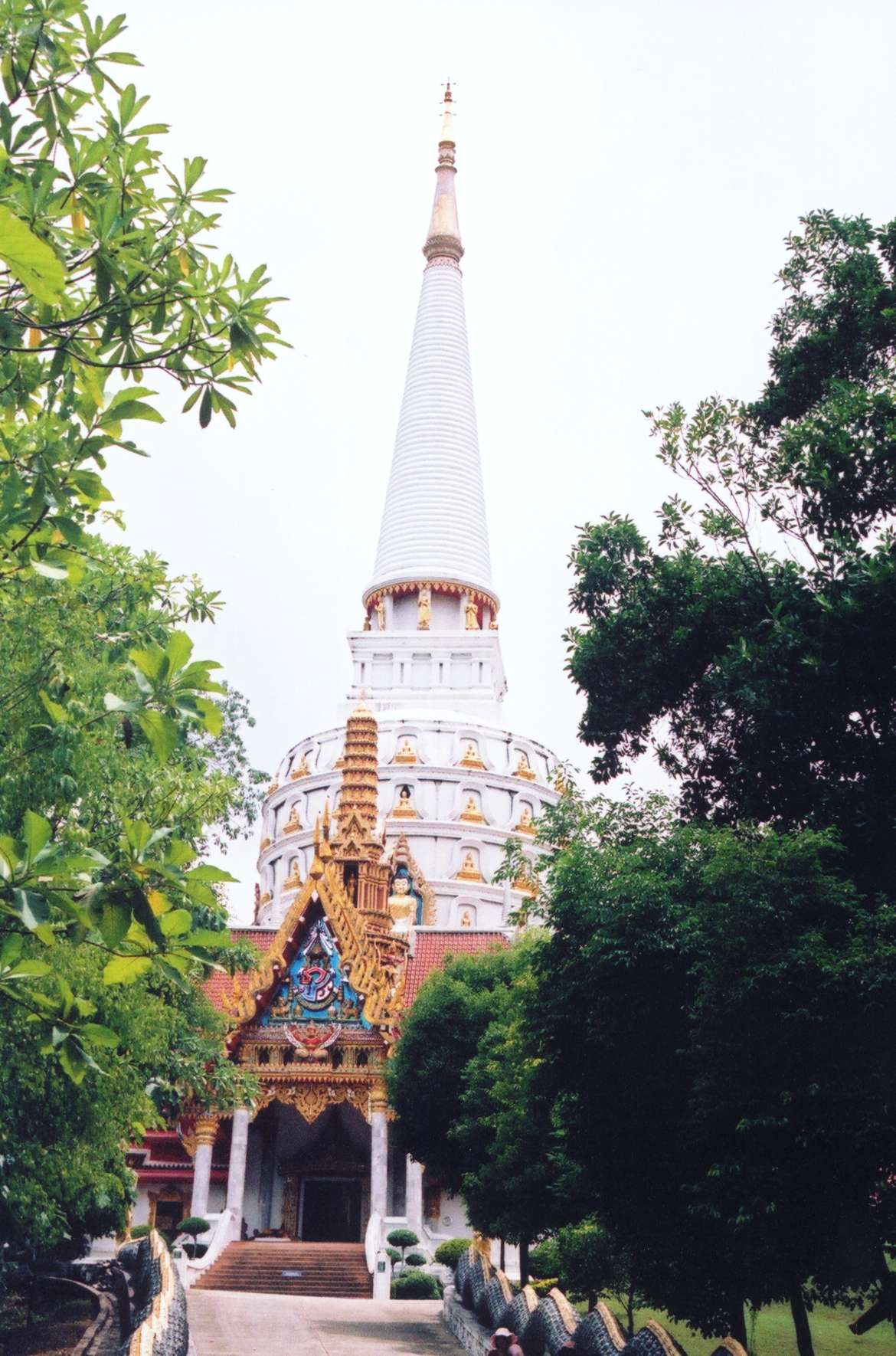
Chedi, Wat Bang Riang

== Administration ==
The district is divided into six sub-districts (tambons), which are further subdivided into 38 villages (mubans). Thap Phut itself has township (thesaban tambon) status. There are five tambon administrative organizations (TAO).

No.	Name	Thai name	Villages	Pop.
1.	Thap Put	ทับปุด	6	4,917
2.	Marui	มะรุ่ย	7	5,514
3.	Bo Saen	บ่อแสน	8	6,629
4.	Tham Thonglang	ถ้ำทองหลาง	4	1,618
5.	Khok Charoen	โคกเจริญ	8	3,338
6.	Bang Riang	บางเหรียง	5	2,030

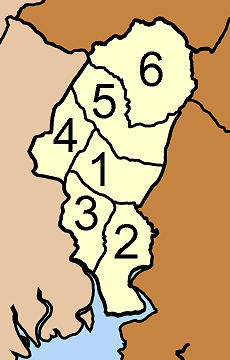
