= Wang Wiset district =

Wang Wiset วังวิเศษ
- District
- District location in Trang province
- Coordinates: 7°44′6″N 99°23′36″E
- Country: Thailand
- Province: Trang
- Seat: Wang Maprang Nuea

Area
  - Total: 477.125 km^{2} (184.219 sq mi)

Population (2005)
  - Total: 38,696
  - Density: 81.1/km^{2} (210/sq mi)
- Time zone: UTC+7 (ICT)
- Postal code: 92220
- Geocode: 9207

Wang Wiset (Thai: วังวิเศษ, pronounced [wāŋ wí.sèːt]) is a district (amphoe) of Trang province, Thailand.

== History ==
The minor district (king amphoe) Wang Wiset was established on 15 July 1981 by splitting off five tambons from Sikao district. The first temporary district office was in the temple (Wat) Rat Rangsan, (also named Wat Ton Prang) opened on 2 November 1981.

Wang Wiset was upgraded to a full district on 21 May 1990.

== Geography ==
Neighboring districts are (from the east clockwise): Huai Yot, Mueang Trang, and Sikao of Trang Province; Khlong Thom and Lam Thap of Krabi province; and Bang Khan of Nakhon Si Thammarat province.

== Administration ==
The district is divided into five sub-districts (tambons), which are further subdivided into 70 villages (mubans). Wang Wiset is a township (thesaban tambon) which covers parts of tambon Wang Maprang Nuea. There are a further five tambon administrative organizations (TAO).

No.	Name	Thai name	Villages	Pop.
1.	Khao Wiset	เขาวิเศษ	21	11,832
2.	Wang Maprang	วังมะปราง	11	5,124
3.	Ao Tong	อ่าวตง	15	9,016
4.	Tha Saba	ท่าสะบ้า	11	5,113
5.	Wang Maprang Nuea	วังมะปรางเหนือ	12	7,611

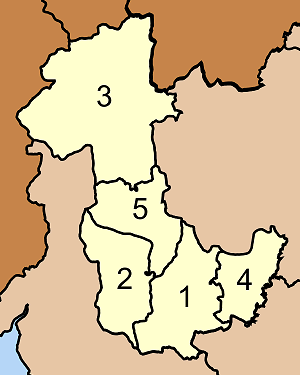
