= Ao Luek district =

Ao Luek อ่าวลึก
- District
- District location in Krabi province
- Coordinates: 8°22′39″N 98°43′18″E
- Country: Thailand
- Province: Krabi
- Subdistricts: 9
- Mubans: 52

Area
  - Total: 772.989 km^{2} (298.453 sq mi)

Population (2014)
  - Total: 55,670
  - Density: 62.7/km^{2} (162/sq mi)
- Time zone: UTC+7 (ICT)
- Postal code: 81110
- Geocode: 8105

Ao Luek (Thai: อ่าวลึก, pronounced [ʔàːw lɯ́k]) is a district (amphoe) in Krabi province, Thailand.

== Geography ==
Neighbouring districts are (from the North clockwise): Plai Phraya, Khao Phanom, and west Thap Put. To the south it borders Phang Nga Bay, to the East is Mueang Krabi of Krabi province.

Than Bok Khorani National Park was established on 30 September 1998 and covers 104 km^{2} of coastal limestone hills and 23 islands off the coast. In the national park is the skull cave (Tham Hua Kalok), containing prehistoric paintings. At a cave in Ao Luek Nuea, Yai Ruak Cave, fossils of 700,000 year-old Javan rhinoceros and hyenas have been found.

== History ==
In 1917, the district's name was changed from Pak Lao (ปากลาว) to Ao Luek.

== Administration ==
=== Central administration ===
Ao Luek is divided into nine sub-districts (tambons), which are further subdivided into 52 administrative villages (mubans).

No.	Name	Thai	Villages	Pop.
1.	Ao Luek Tai	อ่าวลึกใต้	7	10,553
2.	Laem Sak	แหลมสัก	6	6,432
3.	Na Nuea	นาเหนือ	7	4,962
4.	Khlong Hin	คลองหิน	5	6,869
5.	Ao Luek Noi	อ่าวลึกน้อย	6	6,377
6.	Ao Luek Nuea	อ่าวลึกเหนือ	6	7,260
7.	Khao Yai	เขาใหญ่	5	4,346
8.	Khlong Ya	คลองยา	6	3,890
9.	Ban Klang	บ้านกลาง	4	4,981

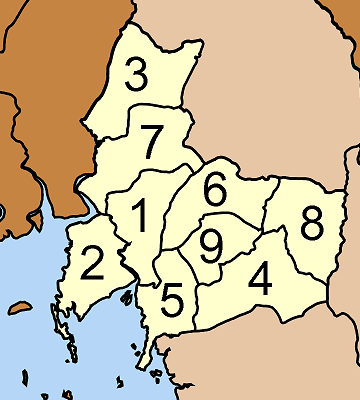

=== Local administration ===
There are two sub-district municipalities (thesaban sambons) in the district:

- Laem Sak (Thai: เทศบาลตำบลแหลมสัก) consisting of parts of sub-district Laem Sak.
- Ao Luek Tai (Thai: เทศบาลตำบลอ่าวลึกใต้) consisting of parts of sub-districts Ao Luek Tai and Ao Luek Nuea.

There are nine sub-district administrative organizations (SAO) in the district:

- Ao Luek Tai (Thai: องค์การบริหารส่วนตำบลอ่าวลึกใต้) consisting of parts of sub-district Ao Luek Tai.
- Laem Sak (Thai: องค์การบริหารส่วนตำบลแหลมสัก) consisting of parts of sub-district Laem Sak.
- Na Nuea (Thai: องค์การบริหารส่วนตำบลนาเหนือ) consisting of sub-district Na Nuea.
- Khlong Hin (Thai: องค์การบริหารส่วนตำบลคลองหิน) consisting of sub-district Khlong Hin.
- Ao Luek Noi (Thai: องค์การบริหารส่วนตำบลอ่าวลึกน้อย) consisting of sub-district Ao Luek Noi.
- Ao Luek Nuea (Thai: องค์การบริหารส่วนตำบลอ่าวลึกเหนือ) consisting of parts of sub-district Ao Luek Nuea.
- Khao Yai (Thai: องค์การบริหารส่วนตำบลเขาใหญ่) consisting of sub-district Khao Yai.
- Khlong Ya (Thai: องค์การบริหารส่วนตำบลคลองยา) consisting of sub-district Khlong Ya.
- Ban Klang (Thai: องค์การบริหารส่วนตำบลบ้านกลาง) consisting of sub-district Ban Klang.
