= Kongklai Sor.Sommai =

Thai Muay Thai kickboxer

Kongklai
- Born: 18 October 1998 (age 28); Phitsanulok, Thailand
- Other names: Jenwat Sor.Liamlerd; Jenwat Kor.Kasanon; Kongklai AnnyMuayThai
- Height: 173 cm (5 ft 8 in)
- Weight: 63 kg (139 lb; 10 st)
- Division: Super lightweight Welterweight
- Stance: Southpaw
- Fighting out of: Bangkok, Thailand
- Team: Keatkhamtorn Gym

Kickboxing record
- Total: 136
- Wins: 98
- Losses: 34
- Draws: 4

Kongklai Sor.Sommai (Thai: ก้องไกล ส.สมหมาย, born October 18, 1998) is a Thai Muay Thai fighter.

== Career ==
During 2019, Kongklai engaged in the 30th annual Isuzu Cup Tournament at Siam Omnoi Stadium. He gained popularity due to multiple comeback wins and overall entertaining style.

On January 25, 2020 Kongklai once again rallied late to beat KingStar Rongrienkelakorat by decision and reach the Final of the Isuzu Cup.

On March 14 Kongklai won the Isuzu Cup 140lbs Tournament. He knocked out Prabsuk Siopal with an elbow in round 3 after having been knocked down in the same round. He received the grand prize of 1 million baht and a brand new Isuzu D-Max Pickup truck.

On September 10, 2020, in his first fight back from the Covid lockdown, Kongklai became the first and only fighter to have ever knocked out Stadium Champion Saeksan Or.Kwanmuang, a fighter known for his toughness. He won by 4th round knockout with a right cross in the Sor.Sommai Birthday event at Rajadamnern Stadium

Kongklai won the rematch a month later on October 10, when he took away Saeksan's 140lbs Siam Omnoi Stadium title by unanimous decision.

Kongklai faced Thai Fight star, Ratchasing Rongrienkelakorat in the Isuzu Cup Super Fight on November 28 when he knocked out Ratchasing with an elbow in the third round to earn himself a spot in the King's Cup.

On December 9, 2020 the Sports Authority of Thailand committee voted unanimously in favor of Kongklai for the Fighter of the Year award. He was the only fighter out of the five nominees to have gone undefeated in the year.

== Titles and accomplishments ==
- Thai Fight
  - 2020 Isuzu Cup Superfight -64kg Champion
  - 2020 Thai Fight King's Cup -67kg Champion
- Siam Omnoi Stadium
  - 2020 Isuzu Cup Tournament 140 lbs Winner
  - 2020 Siam Omnoi Stadium 140 lbs Champion
- Max Muay Thai
  - 2016 Max Muay Thai The Champion Tournament 140 lbs Winner
- Awards
  - 2020 Sports Authority of Thailand Fighter of the Year
  - 2020 Wan Muay Thai Awards Fighter of the Year

== Fight record ==
Muay Thai record
98 Wins, 37 Losses, 4 Draws
Date	Result	Opponent	Event	Location	Method	Round	Time
2026-07-17	Loss	(Morocco) Adam Benwarwar	ONE Friday Fights 162, Lumpinee Stadium	Bangkok, Thailand	TKO (3 Knockdowns)	2	2:44
2026-05-01	Loss	(Brazil) Julio Lobo	ONE Friday Fights 152, Lumpinee Stadium	Bangkok, Thailand	Decision (Unanimous)	3	3:00
2026-02-27	Win	(Iran) Mohammad Habibpour	ONE Friday Fights 144, Lumpinee Stadium	Bangkok, Thailand	TKO (Referee stoppage)	2	2:47
2025-11-28	Win	(United States) Kendu Irving	ONE Friday Fights 135, Lumpinee Stadium	Bangkok, Thailand	Decision (Majority)	3	3:00
2025-08-29	Win	(Thailand) Ferrari Fairtex	ONE Friday Fights 122, Lumpinee Stadium	Bangkok, Thailand	KO (Left cross)	3	2:06
2025-04-23	Win	(Morocco) Zakaria Rouikat	Muay Thai Palangmai, Rajadamnern Stadium	Bangkok, Thailand	TKO	3	
2025-01-29	Loss	(Thailand) Kritsana DaodenMuaythai	Muay Thai Palangmai, Rajadamnern Stadium	Bangkok, Thailand	Decision	5	3:00
2024-12-06	Loss	(Belarus) Antar Kacem	ONE Friday Fights 90, Lumpinee Stadium	Bangkok, Thailand	KO (Right hook)	2	0:45
2024-09-20	Win	(Turkey) Deniz Demirkapu	ONE Friday Fights 80, Lumpinee Stadium	Bangkok, Thailand	TKO (Left cross)	1	1:45
2024-06-14	Loss	(England) Otis Waghorn	ONE Friday Fights 67, Lumpinee Stadium	Bangkok, Thailand	TKO (3 knockdowns)	3	1:34
2024-02-02	Loss	(Thailand) Panrit Lookjaomaesaiwaree	ONE Friday Fights 50, Lumpinee Stadium	Bangkok, Thailand	TKO (punches and elbows)	3	0:55
2023-11-03	Loss	(Turkey) Soner Sen	ONE Friday Fights 39, Lumpinee Stadium	Bangkok, Thailand	KO (Punches)	1	2:35
2023-08-25	Win	(Romania) Silviu Vitez	ONE Friday Fights 30, Lumpinee Stadium	Bangkok, Thailand	TKO (Knees)	2	2:42
2023-06-30	Win	(Thailand) Paedsanlek PK Saenchai	ONE Friday Fights 23, Lumpinee Stadium	Bangkok, Thailand	TKO (3 Knockdowns)	2	2:19
2023-05-12	Win	(Thailand) Thaksinlek DN.MuayThaiGym	Muay Thai Lumpinee Pitaktam	Songkhla province, Thailand	Decision	5	3:00
2023-03-31	Loss	(Thailand) Superball Tded99	ONE Friday Fights 11, Lumpinee Stadium	Bangkok, Thailand	Decision (Unanimous)	3	3:00
2023-02-17	Loss	(Thailand) Superball Tded99	ONE Friday Fights 5, Lumpinee Stadium	Bangkok, Thailand	Decision (Unanimous)	3	3:00
2023-01-07	Loss	(Thailand) Rambolek Tor.Yotha	Ruamponkon Samui: Samui Super Fight, Phetchbuncha Stadium	Ko Samui, Thailand	Decision	5	3:00
2022-10-21	Loss	(France) Antar Kacem	IPFC 6	Vladivostok, Russia	KO (3 Knockdowns/punches)	1	1:10
2022-10-01	Win	(Thailand) Rambolek Tor.Yotha	Muay Thai Vithee TinThai + Kiatpetch	Buriram province, Thailand	Decision	5	3:00
2022-08-31	Win	(Thailand) Petchmanee Por.Lakboon	Muay Thai Palangmai, Rajadamnern Stadium	Bangkok, Thailand	Decision	5	3:00
2022-08-02	Win	(Thailand) Patakthep Pakbangkakaw	Birthday Pitaktham Super Fight	Songkhla province, Thailand	KO (Elbow)	4	2:00
2022-06-20	Loss	(Thailand) Kulabdam Sor.Jor.Piek-U-Thai	U-Muay RuamJaiKonRakMuayThai + Palangmai, Rajadamnern Stadium	Bangkok, Thailand	Decision	5	3:00
2022-03-11	Loss	(Thailand) Sangmanee Sor.KafaeMuayThai	Pitaktham + Sor.Sommai + Palangmai	Songkhla province, Thailand	Decision	5	3:00
2021-12-19	Win	(Italy) Alessandro Sara	THAI FIGHT Khao Aor, King Cup Welterweight tournament - Final	Phatthalung, Thailand	KO (Spinning backfist)	1	
Wins 2020 THAI FIGHT King’s Cup 67kg title.
2021-07-03	Win	(Thailand) Patrick Kellner	THAI FIGHT Strong	Pattaya, Thailand	KO (Left hook)	1	
2021-04-25	Win	(United States) Timothy Kamal	THAI FIGHT DMHTT	Samut Sakhon, Thailand	KO (Left cross)	1	
2021-04-03	Win	(Iran) Sajad Sattari	Thai Fight Nan	Nan province, Thailand	KO (Punches)	2	
2020-11-28	Win	(Thailand) Ratchasing Rongrienkelakorat	THAI FIGHT Pluak Daeng	Rayong, Thailand	KO (Left Elbow)	3	
2020-10-10	Win	(Thailand) Saeksan Or. Kwanmuang	SuekJaoMuayThai, Siam Omnoi Stadium	Samut Sakhon, Thailand	Decision (Unanimous)	5	3:00
Wins Siam Omnoi Stadium 140 lbs title.
2020-09-10	Win	(Thailand) Saeksan Or. Kwanmuang	Sor.Sommai Birthday, Rajadamnern Stadium	Bangkok, Thailand	KO (Right Cross)	4	
2020-03-14	Win	(Thailand) Prabsuk Siopal	SuekJaoMuayThai, Omnoi Stadium – Isuzu Cup Final	Samut Sakhon, Thailand	KO (Elbow)	3	
Wins Isuzu Cup 140 lbs title.
2020-01-25	Win	(Thailand) KingStar Rongrienkelakorat	SuekJaoMuayThai, Omnoi Stadium – Isuzu Cup Semi Final	Samut Sakhon, Thailand	Decision	5	3:00
2019-11-09	Win	(Thailand) Taksila Chor.Hapayak	SuekJaoMuayThai, Omnoi Stadium – Isuzu Cup	Samut Sakhon, Thailand	KO (Elbow)	3	
2019-10-05	Win	(Thailand) Mahadet P.K.Saenchaimuaythaigym	SuekJaoMuayThai, Omnoi Stadium – Isuzu Cup	Samut Sakhon, Thailand	KO (Right hook)	3	
2019-09-07	Win	(Thailand) Petchnarin Kluarae1T	SuekJaoMuayThai, Omnoi Stadium – Isuzu Cup	Samut Sakhon, Thailand	KO (Left Cross)	3	
2019-07-06	Win	(Thailand) Prabsuk Siopal	Omnoi Stadium	Samut Sakhon, Thailand	TKO (Low Kicks)	3	
2019-06-11	Win	(Thailand) Kongnapa Sirimongkhol	Sangmorakot, Lumpinee Stadium	Bangkok, Thailand	KO (Left Cross)	3	
2019-04-05	Win	(Cambodia) Thun Chantak	Bayon TV	Phnom Penh, Cambodia	KO (body kick)	2	2:25
2019-01-11	Win	(Cambodia) Phal Sophorn	Bayon TV	Phnom Penh, Cambodia	Decision	5	3:00
2019-01-03	Win	(Thailand) NuerMek Khainuplasod		Phitsanulok, Thailand	KO	4	
2018-10-04	Win	(Thailand) Phetwanmai Chor.Chaphanthong		Thailand	Decision	5	3:00
2018-06-03	Loss	(Thailand) Kongklai Kaewsamrit	Muaydee Vitheethai, Blue Arena	Samut Prakan, Thailand	TKO	3	
2018-04-08	Win	(Thailand) Maneejedsaeng Sakvichian	Muaydee Vitheethai, Blue Arena	Samut Prakan, Thailand	Decision	5	3:00
2018-02-25	Win	(Thailand) Kuchart Daengmorchit	Muaydee Vitheethai, Blue Arena	Samut Prakan, Thailand	KO	3	
2018-01-15	Win	(Thailand) Raksurin Kesagym		Thailand	Decision	5	3:00
2017-12-24	Win	(Cambodia) Muth Klem Kmao	Bayon TV	Phnom Penh, Cambodia	KO (body kicks)	3	
2017-11-20	Loss	(Thailand) Petchartchai Lukchampachai		Thailand	Decision	5	3:00
2017-08-27	Win	(Cambodia) Roeung Saroth	Bayon TV	Phnom Penh, Cambodia	TKO (arm injury)	2	2:25
2017-03-26	Loss	(Netherlands) Alex Grover	Max Muay Thai, Silver Belt Tournament Semi Final	Pattaya, Thailand	TKO (Doctor Stoppage	2	
2016-09-03	Win	(Thailand) Inseenoi Sharkiebox	Max Muay Thai, Final	Pattaya, Thailand	Decision	3	3:00
Wins Max Muay Thai The Champion 140 lbs title.
2016-09-03	Win	(Thailand) Yodwichan Fairtex	Max Muay Thai, Semi Final	Pattaya, Thailand	Decision	3	3:00
2016-07-31	Loss	(Italy) Shan Cangelosi	Max Muay Thai	Pattaya, Thailand	Decision	3	3:00
2015-03-20	Win	(Thailand) Saeksan Suphanburi	Lumpinee Stadium	Bangkok, Thailand	Decision	5	3:00
Legend: Win Loss Draw/No contest Notes
