= Mai Fat =

Political subdivision in Thailand

Coordinates: 7°30′14.3″N 99°19′13.0″E

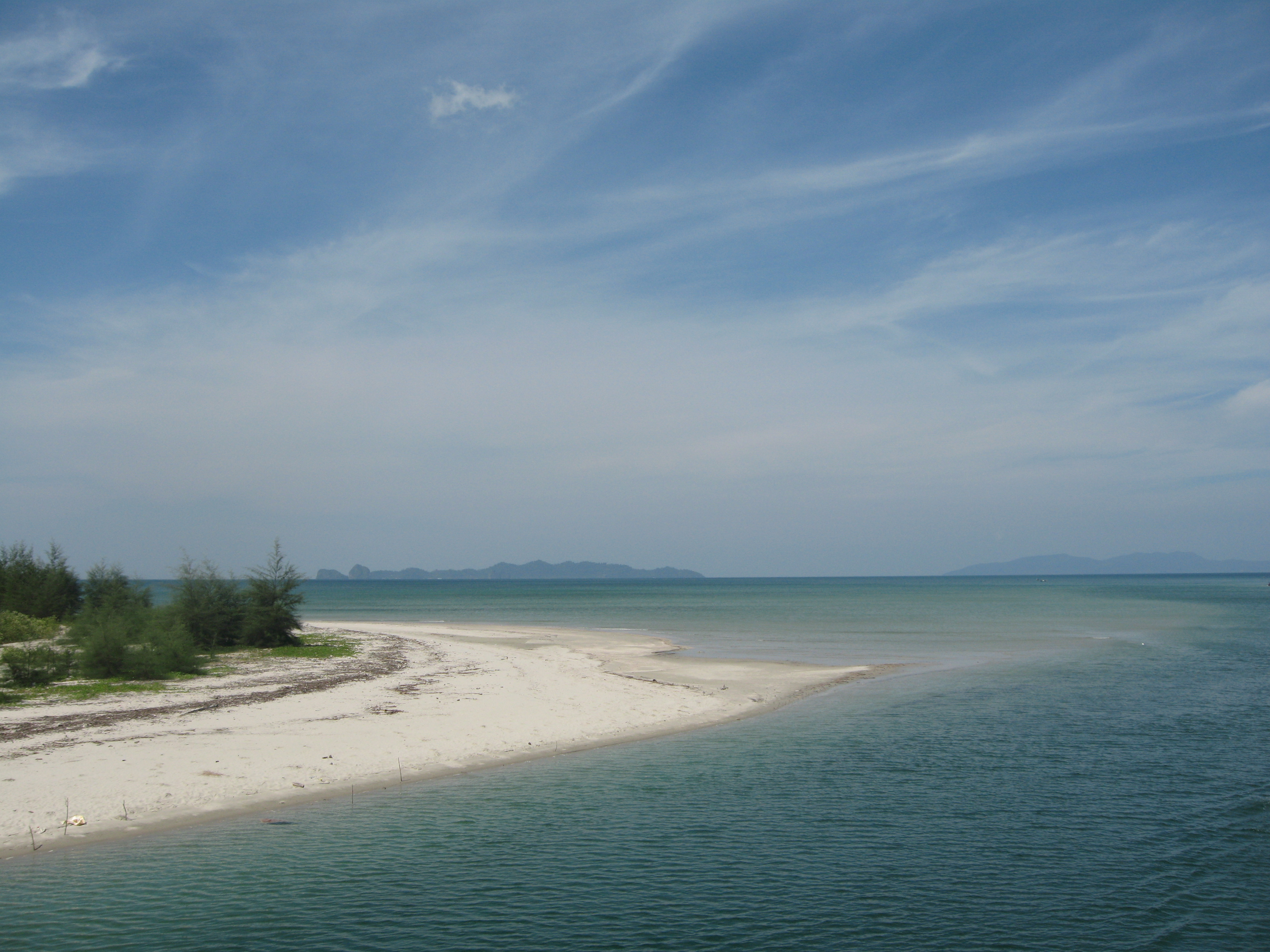
Mouth of Khlong Chang Lang (Chang Lang Canal) which receives water from the Andaman Sea in the area of Mai Fat

Mai Fat (Thai: ไม้ฝาด, pronounced [máːj fàːt]; lit. 'black mangrove wood') is a tambon (sub-district) of Sikao District, Trang Province in southern Thailand.

== Description ==
Mai Fat was established in 1894. Mai Fat is the location of many marine attractions of Trang, such as Pak Meng Beach, Chang Lang Beach, Hat Chao Mai National Park. The Rajamangala Aquarium is at the Faculty of Science and Fisheries Technology, Rajamangala University of Technology Srivijaya, Trang Campus.

== Geography ==
The terrain is characterized by sandy soils, flat hills and the Andaman seacoast. Neighboring sub-districts are (from the north clockwise): Bo Hin, Na Mueang Phet, and Bang Sak. It occupies the southernmost area of the district. It is about 29 km (18 mi) from the Mueang Trang District by road.

== Administration ==
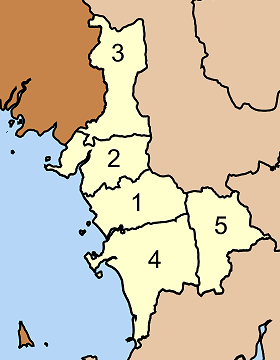
Administrative map of Sikao District. Mai Fat is no. 4

=== Central administration ===
The sub-district is divided into seven administrative villages:

No.	Name	Thai
1.	Ban Huai To	บ้านห้วยต่อ
2.	Ban Huai To Noi	บ้านห้วยต่อน้อย
3.	Ban Mai Fat	บ้านไม้ฝาด
4.	Ban Pak Meng	บ้านปากเมง
5.	Ban Chang Lang	บ้านฉางหลาง
6.	Ban Phom Den	บ้านผมเด็น
7.	Ban Na La	บ้านนาหละ

=== Local administration ===
The sub-district is administered by the subdistrict administrative organization (SAO) Mai Fat (องค์การบริหารส่วนตำบลไม้ฝาด)
