= Chai Buri district =

Chai Buri ชัยบุรี
- District
- District location in Surat Thani province
- Coordinates: 8°27′46″N 99°4′36″E
- Country: Thailand
- Province: Surat Thani
- Seat: Chai Buri

Area
  - Total: 440.7 km^{2} (170.2 sq mi)

Population (15 July 2002)
  - Total: 23,347
  - Density: 53/km^{2} (140/sq mi)
- Time zone: UTC+7 (ICT)
- Postal code: 84210
- Geocode: 8418

Chai Buri (Thai: ชัยบุรี, pronounced [t͡ɕʰāj bū.rīː]) is a district (amphoe) of Surat Thani province, Thailand.

== Geography ==
The district is in the south of the province. The main river is the Khlong Thorom, which crosses the district from south to north.

Neighboring districts are: Phrasaeng to the north and east; to the south, Khao Phanom, and Plai Phraya of Krabi province to the west.

At the boundary to Plai Phraya is the Khlong Phraya Wildlife Sanctuary.

== History ==
On 5 June 1981 the minor district (king amphoe) Chai Buri was created by splitting off tambons Song Phraek and Chai Buri from the Phrasaeng District. The name was chosen in honor of Khun Chai Buri, the first district officer of Phrasaeng.

The minor district started operation on 10 September 1981 with a temporary office in a sermon hall of the temple, Wat Samai Suwan, tambon Song Phraek. Wisut Tansutthiwanit became the first leader of the minor district. In 1983 the ministry of interior had chosen two plots of land for the district office building, one in tambon Song Phraek and one in tambon Chai Buri. Though originally the first location was the preferred one, the leader of the minor district, Napha Kanchonkirana, recommended the second site, as the first was prone to flooding and was also not at the center of the district. In July 1984 the office building in tambon Chai Buri was opened.

On 4 July 1994 the minor district was elevated to a district (amphoe). Niphan Chonwit became the first district officer.

=== Land dispute ===
The 70-family village of Klong Sai Pattana in Chai Buri district has battled Jiew Kang Jue Pattana Co Ltd, a neighbouring palm oil grower, since 2005 over land ownership. For years, the company has occupied a 217 ha (535 acre; 1,352 rai) palm oil plantation surrounding the village. In 2005, the company was sued by the Agricultural Land Reform Organisation (ALRO), a Thai governmental entity whose mandate includes illegal encroachment. A provincial court found for ALRO in 2007, but Jiew Kang Jue Pattana filed numerous appeals until 2014, when the Thai Supreme Court handed ALRO a victory. In 2010, a Klong Sai Pattana villager was murdered by sniper gunfire. Two female villagers were killed in 2012, and a fourth village in 2015. Villagers believe that the gunmen were hired by the palm oil company to intimidate villagers, driving them away. As of 2017 the village has not received a title to the disputed land, no one has been held accountable for the murders and intimidation, and the Jiew Kang Jue Pattana Company still cultivates palm trees on the plot in spite of their being found guilty of illegal trespass.

== Administration ==
The district is divided into four sub-districts (tambons), which are further sub-divided into 37 villages (mubans). There are no municipal (thesaban) areas. Each tambon is administered by a tambon administrative organization (TAO).

No.	Name	Thai name	Villages	Pop.
1.	Song Phraek	สองแพรก	9	5,040
2.	Chai Buri	ชัยบุรี	10	6,126
3.	Khlong Noi	คลองน้อย	10	6,217
4.	Sai Thong	ไทรทอง	8	5,964

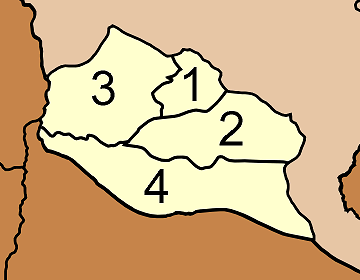
