= Keatkhamtorn Gym =

Muay Thai training camp in Bangkok, Thailand

- Est.: 1999
- Founded by: Jakae Chukorn
- Address: 25 Yaek 3, Ram Inthra, Khan Na Yao, Bangkok 10230
- Location: Bangkok, Thailand
- Website: Keatkhamtorn Gym

Keatkhamtorn Gym (Thai: ค่ายมวยเกียรติกำธร) is a nationally recognized Muay Thai training camp located in Bangkok, Thailand. Established in 1999, the gym has gained a reputation for producing skilled fighters who have excelled in both local and international competitions.

== Notable Fighters ==
Several notable fighters have trained at Keatkhamtorn Gym, achieving success in both national and international competitions. They include:

1. Nopparat Keatkhamtorn - two weight Lumpinee Stadium champion and 2006 Professional Boxing Association of Thailand 130 lbs champion.
2. Kongklai AnnyMuayThai - 2020 Fighter of the Year, Isuzu Cup 140lbs champion.
3. Yuthakarn Keatkhamtorn - Lumpinee Champion at 122 lbs, Thailand Champion at 126 lbs.
4. Laemthong Thor Ponchai - S1 Champion at 126 lbs, Winner of the Tournament Omnoi at 142 lbs.
5. Detsuriya Sittiprasert - S1 Champion at 118 lbs.

Denkiri 13reanresort (Lumpinee Champion at 122 lbs) and Oledon Gratingdaeng (Champion of Boxing WBC Asia-Pacific) also have trained at Keatkhamtorn for several years.

Western fighters who, at one time, have trained in the gym include the UFC Hall of Famer Michael Bisping, 18 time Muay Thai and kickboxing world champion Andrei Kulebin, seven-time female Italian world champion Chantal Ughi, and Glory kickboxing pro out of Portugal, Maria Lobo.
