= Pak Meng Beach =

Beach in Trang Province, Thailand

Coordinates: 7°30′3.17″N 99°19′19.6″E

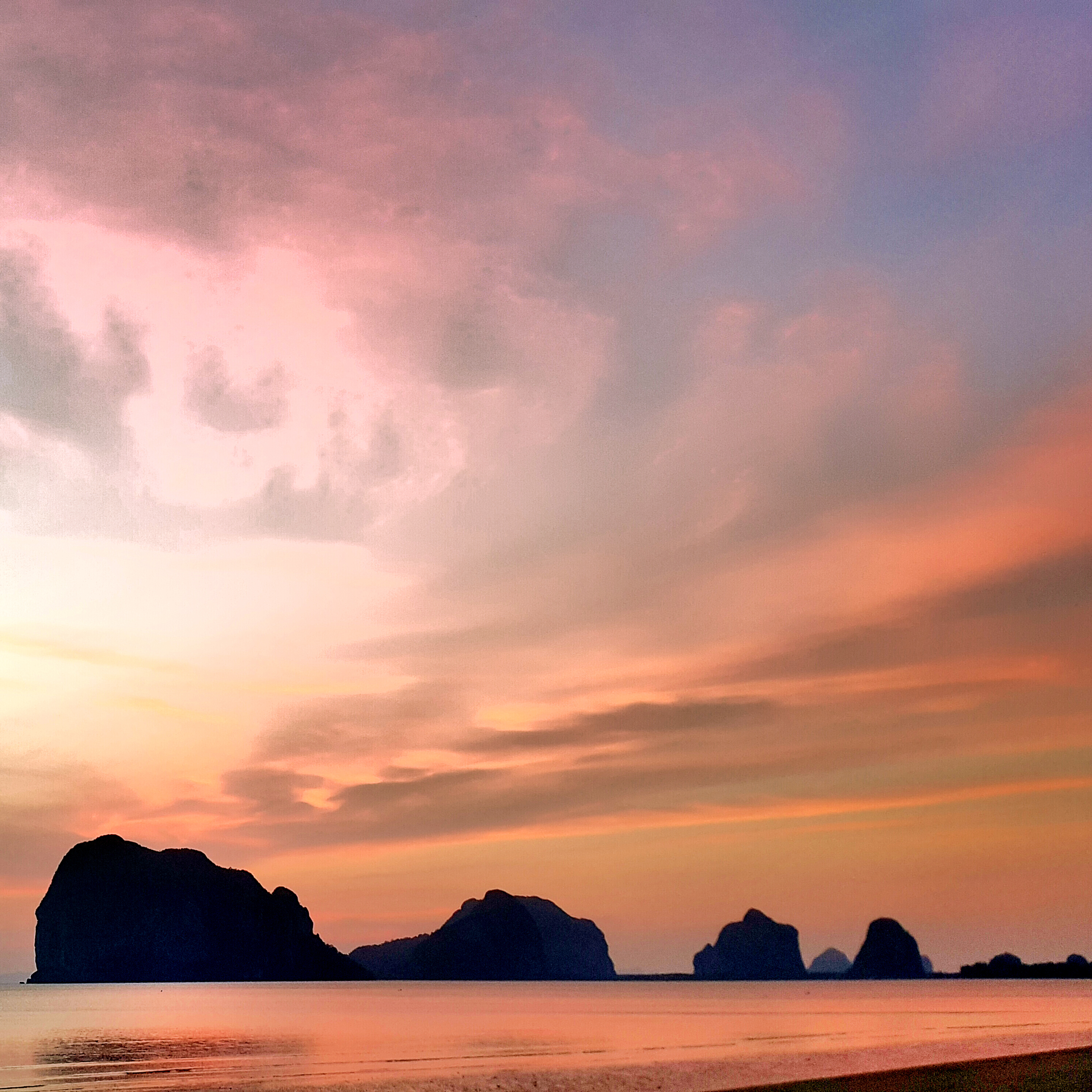
Pak Meng Beach at sundown

Pak Meng Beach (Thai: หาดปากเมง, RTGS: Hat Pak Meng, pronounced [hàːt pàːk mēːŋ]) is a sand beach in Tambon Mai Fat, Amphoe Sikao, Trang Province, southern Thailand. It is known as Trang's most popular beach.

Pak Meng Beach is a crescent shaped beach with a length of about 7 km (4.3 mi) located about 38 km (24 mi) from Trang City, it can be considered as part of nearby Hat Chao Mai National Park. When the tide is at its lowest, there is a 500 m (1,600 ft) sand strip where it is possible to drive a car. This is a result of the wet sand having sufficient density to support the car's weight.

The name of the beach comes from a folklore story about an old man named "Old Meng" (เฒ่าเมง) who was going to have a wedding ceremony for his daughter. But he and his all members of family died from a storm in the sea and his body became a mountain called Khao Meng (เขาเมง), which stands near the beach.

Pak Meng Beach, especially at sunset, is renowned for the scenery.

Pak Meng Beach also has pier, where visitors can rent boats to other nearby marine attractions such as Ko Ngai, Ko Kradan, Ko Ma, Ko Chuek, Ko Waen, Ko Muk and Emerald Cave.

In addition, around Pak Meng Beach are many restaurants, and the road from here to Chang Lang Beach also known as Chao Mai Beach, there are two bridges crossing the estuary of Andaman Sea, which is commonly used as a place for fishing.
