= Sikao district =

Sikao สิเกา
- District
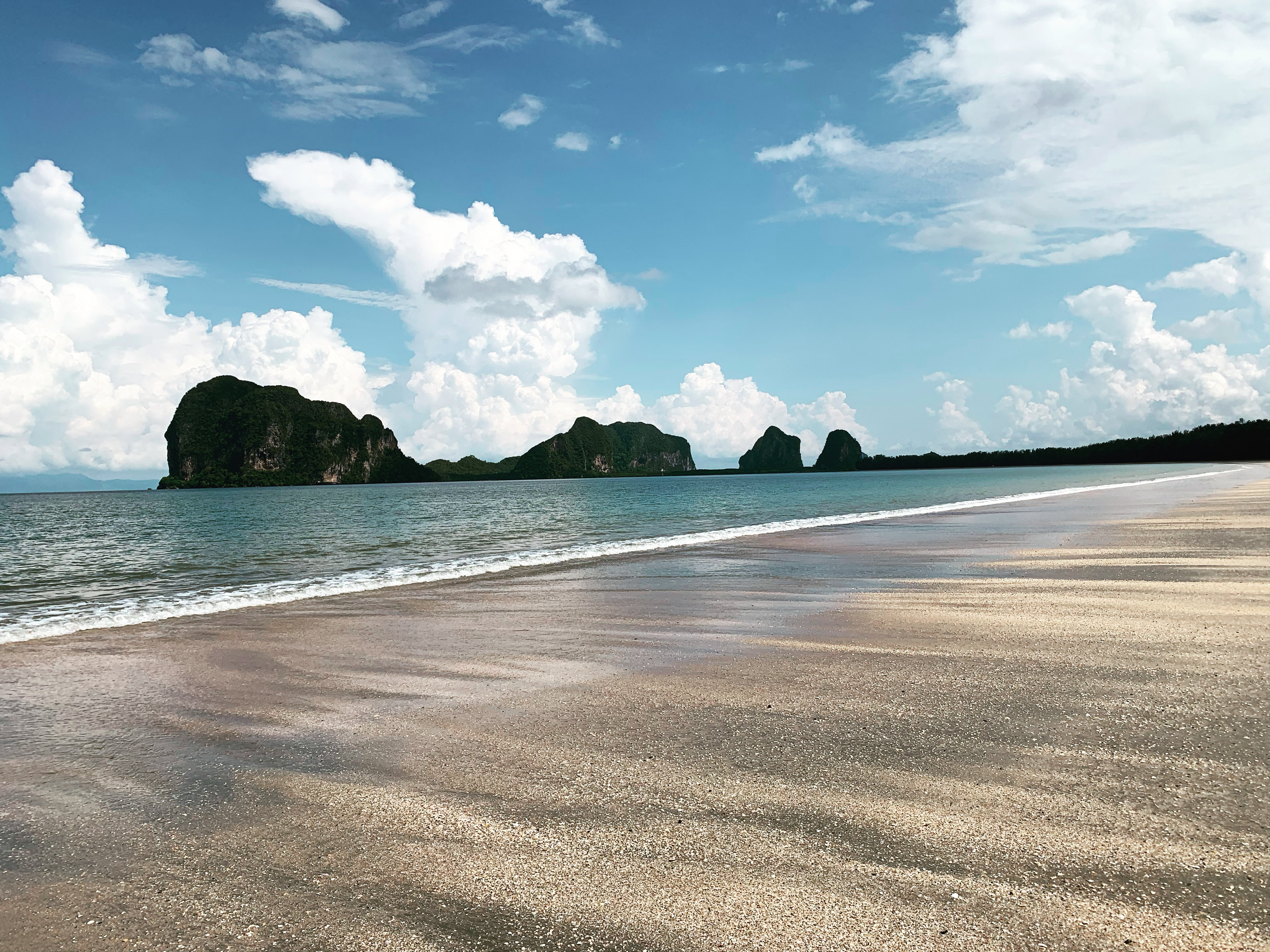
- Pak Meng Beach (หาดปากเมง), near Hat Chao Mai National Park, Rajamangkala Aquarium Trang, Amazing Kaomaikaew

- District location in Trang province
- Coordinates: 7°34′18″N 99°20′42″E
- Country: Thailand
- Province: Trang
- Seat: Bo Hin

Area
  - Total: 524.0 km^{2} (202.3 sq mi)

Population (2005)
  - Total: 34,486
  - Density: 63.6/km^{2} (165/sq mi)
- Time zone: UTC+7 (ICT)
- Postal code: 92150
- Geocode: 9205

Sikao (Thai: สิเกา, pronounced [sìʔ.kāw]) is a district (amphoe) in the northwestern part of Trang province, Thailand.

== History ==
Sikao district was established in 1887. The present district office was opened 1 March 1987. Sikao District's administrative office is in Bohin Sub-district (Sikao townships)

== Geography ==
Neighboring districts are (from the northwest clockwise): Khlong Thom of Krabi province; Wang Wiset, Mueang Trang, and Kantang of Trang Province. To the west is the Andaman Sea.

== Administration ==
The district is divided into five sub-districts (tambons), which are further subdivided into 40 villages (mubans). There are two townships (thesaban tambons). Sikao covers parts of tambon Bo Hin, and Khuan Kun covers parts of Kalase. There are a further five tambon administrative organizations (TAO).

No.	Name	Thai name	Villages	Pop.
1.	Bo Hin	บ่อหิน	9	7,780
2.	Khao Mai Kaeo	เขาไม้แก้ว	9	5,961
3.	Kalase	กะลาเส	8	7,611
4.	Mai Fat	ไม้ฝาด	7	8,296
5.	Na Mueang Phet	นาเมืองเพชร	7	4,838

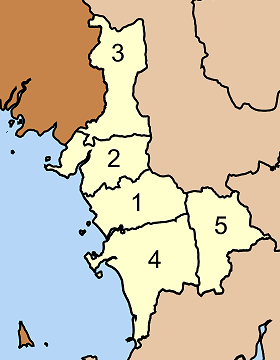

== Economy ==
Sikao is one of the proposed entrances to the Thai Canal. It is designated as Route 9A. The canal would connect to the Gulf of Thailand, 135 km to the east.
