= Plai Phraya district =

Plai Phraya ปลายพระยา
- District
- District location in Krabi province
- Coordinates: 8°32′0″N 98°51′46″E
- Country: Thailand
- Province: Krabi
- Seat: Plai Phraya

Area
  - Total: 433.4 km^{2} (167.3 sq mi)

Population (6 November 2002)
  - Total: 35,434
  - Density: 81.8/km^{2} (212/sq mi)
- Time zone: UTC+7 (ICT)
- Postal code: 81160
- Geocode: 8106

Plai Phraya (Thai: ปลายพระยา, pronounced [plāːj pʰrā.jāː]) is a district (amphoe) in Krabi province, Thailand.

== Geography ==
Neighboring districts are (from the north clockwise): Phanom, Phrasaeng, Chai Buri (all Surat Thani province); Khao Phanom and Ao Luek of Krabi Province; and Thap Put of Phang Nga province.

Khlong Phraya Wildlife Sanctuary is on the Surat Thani Province border.

== History ==
The minor district (king amphoe) Plai Phraya was created on 15 June 1973, when the three tambons, Plai Phraya, Khao Khen, and Khao To, were split off from Ao Luek district. It was upgraded to a full district on 12 April 1977.

== Administration ==
The district is divided into four sub-districts (tambons), which are further subdivided into 33 villages (mubans). Plai Phraya has township (thesaban tambon) status, covering parts of tambon Plai Phraya. Each of the tambons is administrated by a tambon administrative organization (TAO).

No.	Name	Thai name	Villages	Pop.
1.	Plai Phraya	ปลายพระยา	13	16,692
2.	Khao Khen	เขาเขน	6	6,166
3.	Khao To	เขาต่อ	7	7,026
4.	Khiri Wong	คีรีวง	7	5,550

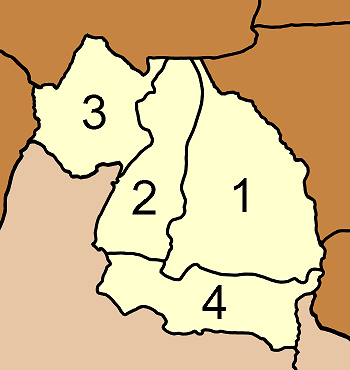
