= Phrasaeng district =

Phrasaeng พระแสง
- District
- District location in Surat Thani province
- Coordinates: 8°34′6″N 99°14′54″E
- Country: Thailand
- Province: Surat Thani
- Seat: I-pan

Area
  - Total: 950.0 km^{2} (366.8 sq mi)

Population (5 December 2007)
  - Total: 63,774
  - Density: 63.7/km^{2} (165/sq mi)
- Time zone: UTC+7 (ICT)
- Postal code: 84210
- Geocode: 8416

Phraseang (Thai: พระแสง, pronounced [pʰrá(ʔ).sɛ̌ːŋ]) is a district (amphoe) of Surat Thani province, Thailand.

== Geography ==
The district is in the south of the province. Neighboring districts are (from north clockwise): Phanom, Khian Sa, Wiang Sa of Surat Thani Province; Tham Phannara, Thung Yai of Nakhon Si Thammarat province; Chai Buri of Surat Thani Province; Khao Phanom and Plai Phraya of Krabi province.

At the boundary to Plai Phraya is the Khlong Phraya Wildlife Sanctuary.

== Climate ==
Climate data for Phrasaeng (1981–2010)
Month	Jan	Feb	Mar	Apr	May	Jun	Jul	Aug	Sep	Oct	Nov	Dec	Year
Record high °C (°F)	36.8 (98.2)	38.2 (100.8)	38.8 (101.8)	40.0 (104.0)	38.6 (101.5)	36.8 (98.2)	34.8 (94.6)	35.0 (95.0)	34.6 (94.3)	34.5 (94.1)	34.2 (93.6)	34.2 (93.6)	40.0 (104.0)
Mean daily maximum °C (°F)	32.4 (90.3)	34.4 (93.9)	35.0 (95.0)	35.1 (95.2)	33.4 (92.1)	32.5 (90.5)	32.2 (90.0)	32.3 (90.1)	32.2 (90.0)	31.5 (88.7)	31.0 (87.8)	31.0 (87.8)	32.8 (91.0)
Daily mean °C (°F)	26.3 (79.3)	27.3 (81.1)	27.9 (82.2)	28.2 (82.8)	27.6 (81.7)	27.2 (81.0)	26.9 (80.4)	27.0 (80.6)	26.8 (80.2)	26.5 (79.7)	26.4 (79.5)	26.1 (79.0)	27.0 (80.6)
Mean daily minimum °C (°F)	21.3 (70.3)	21.0 (69.8)	22.0 (71.6)	23.2 (73.8)	23.7 (74.7)	23.4 (74.1)	23.2 (73.8)	23.1 (73.6)	23.1 (73.6)	23.2 (73.8)	22.9 (73.2)	22.1 (71.8)	22.7 (72.9)
Record low °C (°F)	16.0 (60.8)	14.4 (57.9)	15.7 (60.3)	16.6 (61.9)	21.1 (70.0)	21.4 (70.5)	20.5 (68.9)	21.4 (70.5)	20.6 (69.1)	20.5 (68.9)	19.0 (66.2)	16.8 (62.2)	14.4 (57.9)
Average rainfall mm (inches)	43.8 (1.72)	42.7 (1.68)	102.7 (4.04)	114.7 (4.52)	161.6 (6.36)	151.3 (5.96)	172.4 (6.79)	182.4 (7.18)	170.0 (6.69)	226.2 (8.91)	180.1 (7.09)	92.6 (3.65)	1,640.5 (64.59)
Average rainy days	7.3	5.2	8.8	13.2	18.2	18.6	19.5	19.9	20.8	23.1	17.2	12.9	184.7
Average relative humidity (%)	80	75	76	79	84	85	85	85	85	87	87	84	83
Mean monthly sunshine hours	179.8	180.8	186.0	183.0	114.7	150.0	114.7	114.7	108.0	108.5	105.0	142.6	1,687.8
Mean daily sunshine hours	5.8	6.4	6.0	6.1	3.7	5.0	3.7	3.7	3.6	3.5	3.5	4.6	4.6
Source 1: Thai Meteorological Department
Source 2: Office of Water Management and Hydrology, Royal Irrigation Department (sun and humidity)

== History ==
The district was first established in 1896 as part of the Monthon Nakhon Si Thammarat. The following year it and neighboring I-Pan District were reduced to tambons and put under the control of Lamphun District (the present-day Ban Na San district). In 1899 the monthon administrator Phraya Sukhumnaiwinit (Pan Sukhum) visited the area and noticed that Lamphun was too large to administer the area efficiently, and recreated the Phrasaeng District consisting of tambons Phrasaeng and I-Pan. In 1906 the district was transferred to Mueang Chaiya, which is now Surat Thani Province.

Around 1940 a new district office in Ban Yan Din Daeng was built, as the old location in Ban Sai Khueng was not within reach of all of the population. Also on 1 August 1938 the district was reduced in status to a minor district (king amphoe). It was upgraded to full district status in 1958.

In 1968 King Bhumibol Adulyadej and his family made a royal visit to the district. On that occasion the king donated a Caterpillar D4 bulldozer to the community, to aid in the development of the area.

== Etymology ==
The name of the district originates from an event which happened at the creation of the district. The government sent an official named Phrasaeng Phiram to oversee construction of the district office. When the hole for the foundation was dug, a sword was found which, due to its unusual shape, was identified as a royal sword. Named Phrasaeng Dab (Thai พระแสงดาบ) it was kept in the district office and gave its name to the district. The sword has been lost, casting the story into doubt.

== Administration ==
The district is divided into seven sub-districts (tambons), which are further subdivided into 74 villages (mubans). There are two sub-district municipalities (thesaban tambons): Bang Sawan covers parts of tambon Bang Sawan, and Yan Din Daeng parts of tambon I-pan. There are a further seven tambon administrative organizations (TAO), responsible for the non-municipal areas.

No.	Name	Thai	Villages	Pop.
1.	I-pan	อิปัน	12	12,162
2.	Sin Pun	สินปุน	10	6,726
3.	Bang Sawan	บางสวรรค์	14	16,774
4.	Sai Khueng	ไทรขึง	13	9,226
5.	Sin Charoen	สินเจริญ	10	8,613
6.	Sai Sopha	ไทรโสภา	8	5,580
7.	Sakhu	สาคู	7	4,693

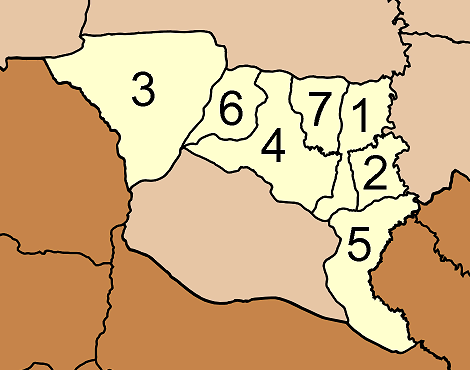
