= Tham Phannara district =

Tham Phannara ถ้ำพรรณรา
- District
- District location in Nakhon Si Thammarat province
- Coordinates: 8°25′12″N 99°23′42″E
- Country: Thailand
- Province: Nakhon Si Thammarat
- Seat: Tham Phannara

Area
  - Total: 169.1 km^{2} (65.3 sq mi)

Population (2017)
  - Total: 19,246
  - Density: 102.4/km^{2} (265/sq mi)
- Time zone: UTC+7 (ICT)
- Postal code: 80260
- Geocode: 8018

Tham Phannara (Thai: ถ้ำพรรณรา, pronounced [tʰâm pʰān.nā.rāː]) is a district (amphoe) of Nakhon Si Thammarat province, southern Thailand.

== Geography ==
Neighboring districts are (from the east clockwise): Chawang and Thung Yai of Nakhon Si Thammarat, and Phrasaeng and Wiang Sa of Surat Thani province.

== History ==
The district was created as a minor district (king amphoe) on 1 April 1990, when the two tambons Tham Phannara and Khlong Se were split off from Chawang district. A first temporary district office was within Wat Tham Phannara, until the current office building was opened on 4 October 1993. On 7 September 1995 the minor district was upgraded to a full district.

== Administration ==
=== Central administration ===
Tham Phannara is subdivided into three subdistricts (tambons), which are further subdivided into 29 administrative villages (mubans).

No.	Name	Thai	Villages	Pop.
1.	Tham Phannara	ถ้ำพรรณรา	10	7,864
2.	Khlong Se	คลองเส	8	4,331
3.	Dusit	ดุสิต	11	7,051

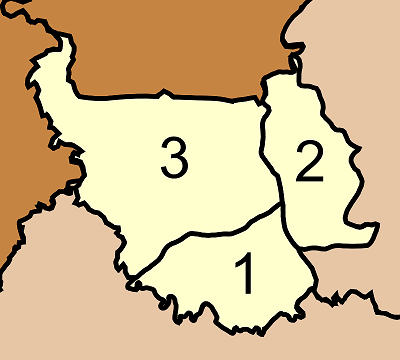

=== Local administration ===
There are three subdistrict administrative organizations (SAO) in the district:

- Tham Phannara (Thai: องค์การบริหารส่วนตำบลถ้ำพรรณรา) consisting of subdistrict Tham Phannara.
- Khlong Se (Thai: องค์การบริหารส่วนตำบลคลองเส) consisting of subdistrict Khlong Se.
- Dusit (Thai: องค์การบริหารส่วนตำบลดุสิต) consisting of subdistrict Dusit.
