= Bang Khan district =

District of Thailand

Bang Khan บางขัน
- District
- District location in Nakhon Si Thammarat province
- Coordinates: 8°1′36″N 99°28′24″E
- Country: Thailand
- Province: Nakhon Si Thammarat
- Seat: Ban Lamnao

Area
  - Total: 601.7 km^{2} (232.3 sq mi)

Population (2005)
  - Total: 40,498
  - Density: 67.3/km^{2} (174/sq mi)
- Time zone: UTC+7 (ICT)
- Postal code: 80360
- Geocode: 8017

Bang Khan (Thai: บางขัน, pronounced [bāːŋ kʰǎn]) is a district (amphoe) of Nakhon Si Thammarat province, southern Thailand.

== Geography ==
Neighboring districts are (from the north clockwise): Thung Yai and Thung Song of Nakhon Si Thammarat; Ratsada, Huai Yot, and Wang Wiset of Trang province; and Lam Thap of Krabi province.

== History ==
The district was created as a minor district (king amphoe) on 1 April 1984, when the three tambons Bang Khan, Ban Lamnao, and Wang Hin were split off from Thung Song district. On 9 April 1992, the minor district was upgraded to a full district.

== Administration ==
The district is divided into four sub-districts (tambons), which are further subdivided into 60 villages (mubans). There are no municipal (thesaban) areas, and three tambon administrative organizations (TAO).

No.	Name	Thai name	Villages	Pop.
1.	Bang Khan	บางขัน	18	12,253
2.	Ban Lamnao	บ้านลำนาว	16	13,271
3.	Wang Hin	วังหิน	13	8,145
4.	Ban Nikhom	บ้านนิคม	13	6,829

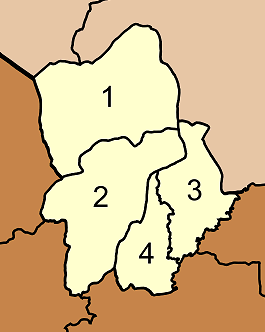
