= Tham Phannara subdistrict =

Tham Phannara ถ้ำพรรณรา
- Subdistrict
- Interactive map of Tham Phannara
- Country: Thailand
- Province: Nakhon Si Thammarat
- District: Tham Phannara

Population (2017)
  - Total: 7,864
- Time zone: UTC+7 (ICT)
- Postal code: 80260
- TIS 1099: 801801

Tham Phannara (Thai: ถ้ำพรรณรา) is a tambon (subdistrict) of Tham Phannara District, in Nakhon Si Thammarat Province, Thailand. In 2017 it had a population of 7,864 people.

== History ==
In 1990, Tham Phannara was one of two subdistricts which were split off from Chawang District to form a new minor district, Tham Phannara. The new district was named after this subdistrict, as the district office was built in it.

== Administration ==
=== Central administration ===
The tambon is divided into 10 administrative villages (mubans).

No.	Name	Thai
1.	Ban Pak Phra	บ้านปากผรา
2.	Ban Prai Ra	บ้านปรายรา
3.	Ban Thung Kha Ngio	บ้านทุ่งคางิ้ว
4.	Ban Wang Talap	บ้านวังตลับ
5.	Ban Na Pha	บ้านนาพา
6.	Ban Khlong Ra	บ้านคลองรา
7.	Ban Pho Prasit	บ้านโพธิ์ประสิทธิ์
8.	Ban Pak Tha Song	บ้านปากท่าซอง
9.	Ban Tham Thong	บ้านถ้ำทอง
10.	Ban Sai Phet	บ้านทรายเพชร

=== Local administration ===
The whole area of the subdistrict is covered by the subdistrict administrative organization (SAO) Tham Phannara (องค์การบริหารส่วนตำบลถ้ำพรรณรา).
