= Thung Song district =

Thung Song ทุ่งสง
- District
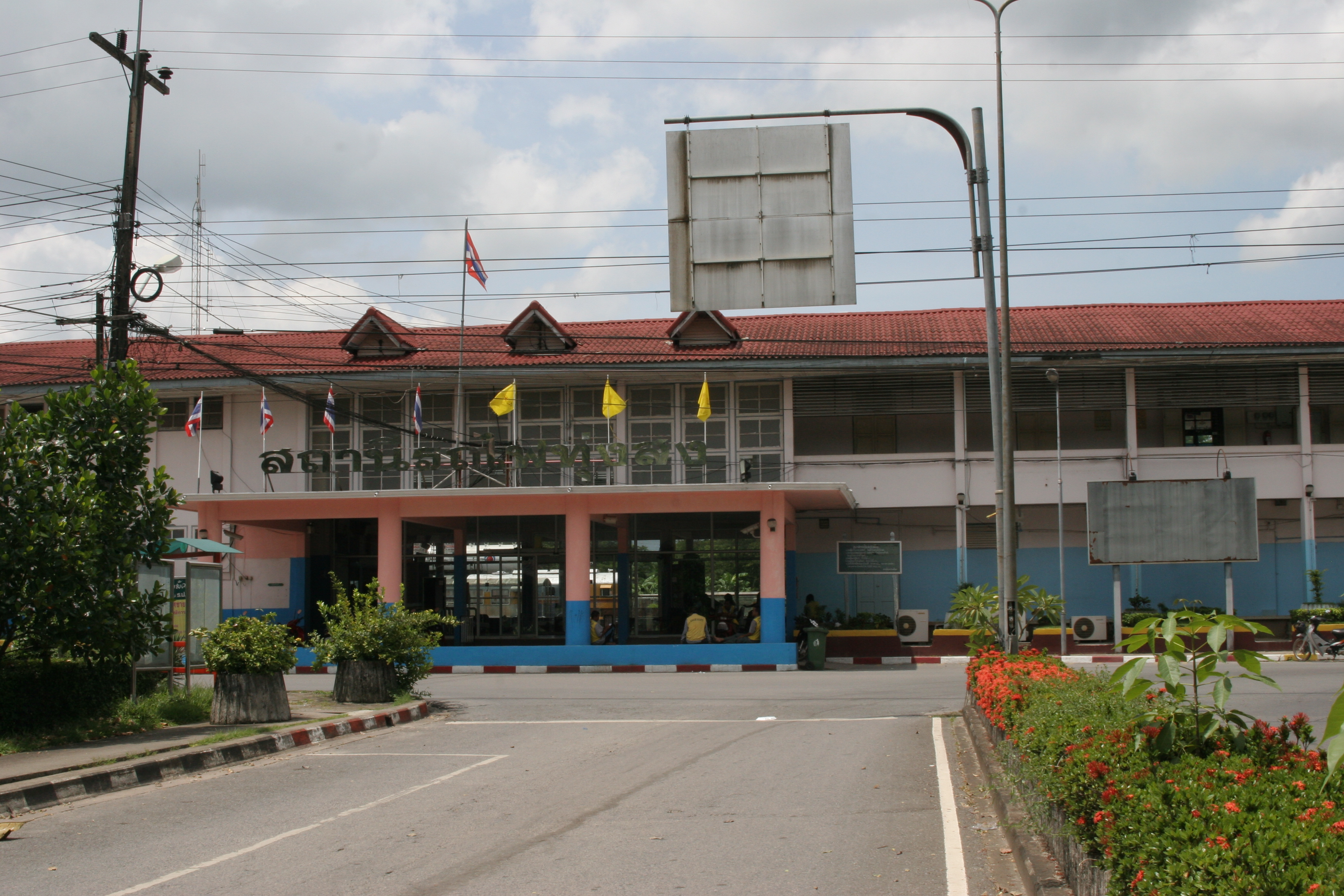
- Thung Song Junction railway station

- District location in Nakhon Si Thammarat province
- Coordinates: 8°9′53″N 99°40′51″E
- Country: Thailand
- Province: Nakhon Si Thammarat
- Seat: Pak Phraek

Area
  - Total: 1,042.0 km^{2} (402.3 sq mi)

Population (2009)
  - Total: 151,563
  - Density: 140.3/km^{2} (363/sq mi)
- Time zone: UTC+7 (ICT)
- Postal code: 80110
- Geocode: 8009

Thung Song (Thai: ทุ่งสง, pronounced [tʰûŋ sǒŋ]) is a district (amphoe) in the southwestern part of Nakhon Si Thammarat province, southern Thailand.

== Geography ==
Neighboring districts are (from the west clockwise): Bang Khan, Thung Yai, Na Bon, Chang Klang, Lan Saka, Ron Phibun, Chulabhorn, and Cha-uat of Nakhon Si Thammarat province; Huai Yot and Ratsada of Trang province.

== Administration ==
The district is divided into 13 sub-districts (tambons), which are further subdivided into 125 villages (mubans). Thung Song is a town (thesaban mueang) covering tambon Pak Phraek. There are a further 12 tambon administrative organizations (TAO).

No.	Name	Thai name	Villages	Pop.
1.	Pak Phraek	ปากแพรก	-	27,358
2.	Chamai	ชะมาย	8	12,127
3.	Nong Hong	หนองหงส์	14	9,722
4.	Khuan Krot	ควนกรด	13	9,525
5.	Na Mai Phai	นาไม้ไผ่	14	8,420
6.	Na Luang Sen	นาหลวงเสน	9	9,228
7.	Khao Ro	เขาโร	11	9,235
8.	Kapang	กะปาง	11	14,578
9.	Thi Wang	ที่วัง	11	12,401
10.	Namtok	น้ำตก	6	2,819
11.	Tham Yai	ถ้ำใหญ่	11	12,102
12.	Na Pho	นาโพธิ์	5	5,779
13.	Khao Khao	เขาขาว	12	12,932

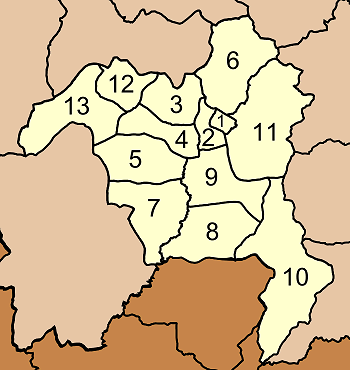

== Environment ==
In the 1980s a dam project was conceived to solve the district's drought problem. An environmental impact assessment (EIA) was conducted in 2003 by the Royal Irrigation Department (RID). It was updated in 2009. Nothing further happened until the National Environmental Board (NEB) approved the EIA on 27 May 2016. In December 2019, the Thai cabinet approved the project. Local residents say that the dam is no longer needed, as newer water management infrastructure such as weirs and small check dams have solved drought problems. The site of the dam is now classified as a 1A watershed forest area and locals do not want to see it inundated. The proposed Wang Heeb Dam will cost 2.3 billion baht and will displace 40 families. The RID insists that it must proceed with the project as it has been approved. The government's goal is clear according to one observer: "...maintaining a firm grip on central control and suppressing local forest management efforts which will dilute their power."

At Ban Nuea, Namtok Subdistrict is the southernmost subdistrict on the border between the three provinces; Nakhon Si Thammarat, Trang, and Phatthalung. The sambar deer live here freely without fear of threats from humans. About 20 years ago, there were less than 10 deer in the Ban Nuea forest, a result of the conservation efforts of the villagers. This causes the population of deer to increase. The Ban Nuea locals consider sambar deer to be part of the community.

== See also ==
- List of districts of Thailand
- Provinces of Thailand
