= Na Bon district =

Na Bon นาบอน
- District
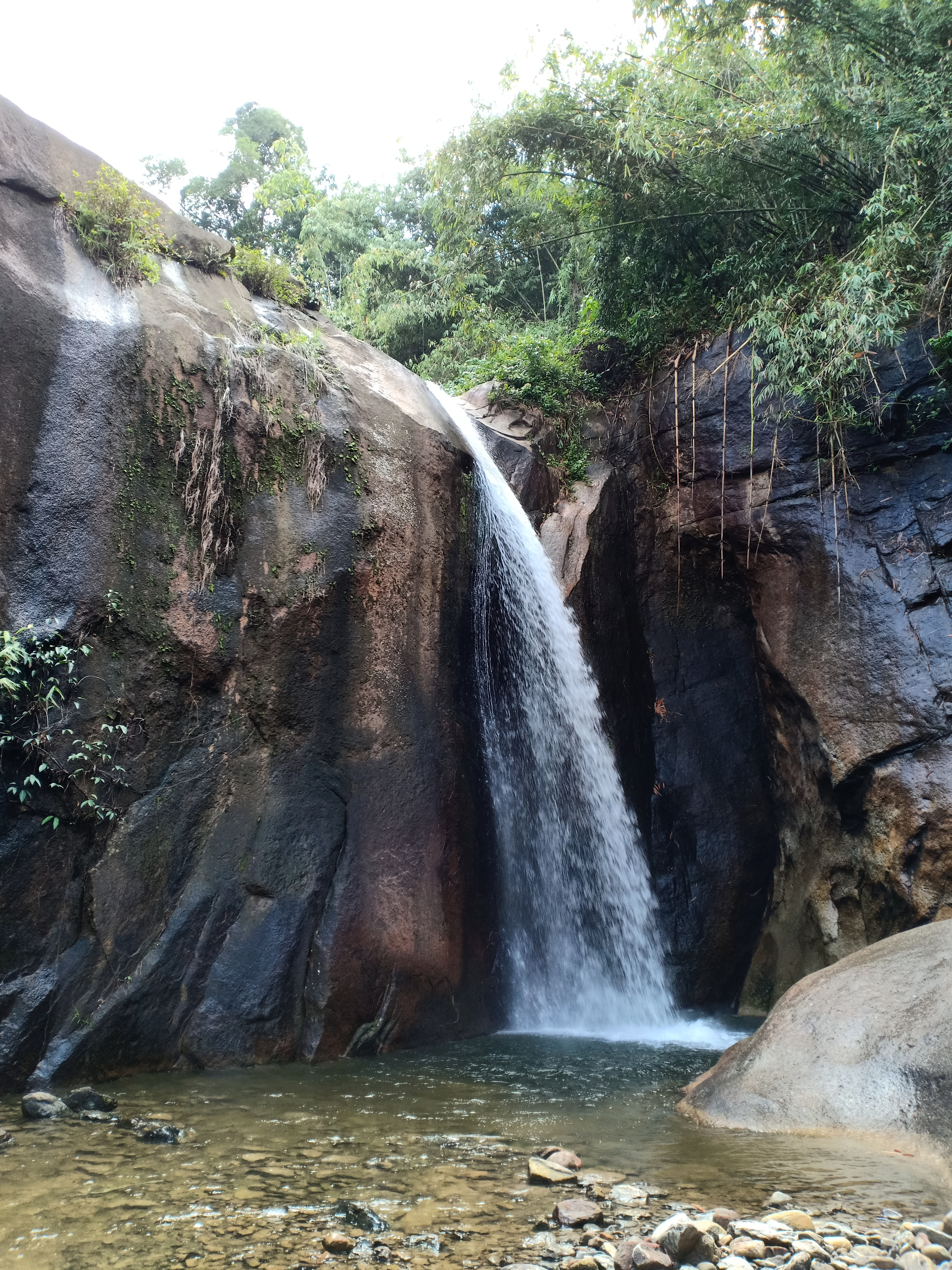
- Khlong Chang waterfall

- District location in Nakhon Si Thammarat province
- Coordinates: 8°15′42″N 99°35′42″E
- Country: Thailand
- Province: Nakhon Si Thammarat
- Seat: Na Bon

Area
  - Total: 192.899 km^{2} (74.479 sq mi)

Population (2005)
  - Total: 26,428
  - Density: 137/km^{2} (350/sq mi)
- Time zone: UTC+7 (ICT)
- Postal code: 80220
- Geocode: 8010

Na Bon (Thai: นาบอน, pronounced [nāː bɔ̄ːn]) is a district (amphoe) of Nakhon Si Thammarat province, southern Thailand.

== Geography ==
Neighboring districts are (from the north clockwise): Chawang, Chang Klang, Thung Song, and Thung Yai.

Namtok Yong National Park is at the boundary to Thung Song District, protecting forested hills of the Nakhon Si Thammarat Range and includes several waterfalls.

== History ==
On 9 June 1975 the two tambons, Na Bon and Thung Song, were split from Thung Song district to form the new minor district (king amphoe) Na Bon. On 13 July 1981 it was upgraded to a full district.

== Symbols ==
The slogan of the district is "Khlong Chang waterfall, good breed of rubber, fertile land, join pit krit festival".

== Administration ==
The district is divided into three sub-districts (tambons), which are further subdivided into 34 villages (mubans). Na Bon is a township (thesaban tambon) which covers parts of tambon Na Bon. There are a further three tambon administrative organizations (TAO).

No.	Name	Thai name	Villages	Pop.
1.	Na Bon	นาบอน	14	11,795
2.	Thung Song	ทุ่งสง	10	7,751
3.	Kaeo Saen	แก้วแสน	10	6,882

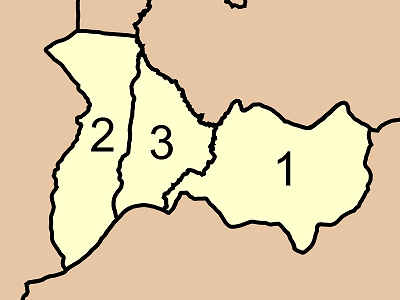
