= Thung Yai district =

Thung Yai ทุ่งใหญ่
- District
- District location in Nakhon Si Thammarat province
- Coordinates: 8°17′48″N 99°22′30″E
- Country: Thailand
- Province: Nakhon Si Thammarat
- Seat: Tha Yang

Area
  - Total: 603.287 km^{2} (232.930 sq mi)

Population (28 July 2000)
  - Total: 67,202
  - Density: 111.4/km^{2} (289/sq mi)
- Time zone: UTC+7 (ICT)
- Postal code: 80240
- Geocode: 8011

Thung Yai (Thai: ทุ่งใหญ่, pronounced [tʰûŋ jàj]) is the westernmost district (amphoe) of Nakhon Si Thammarat province, southern Thailand.

== History ==
Tambon Ku Rae was separated from Thung Song district and made the minor district (king amphoe) Ku Rae in 1906. When the office was moved to Tambon Tha Yang in 1909, the minor district was renamed following the central tambon name. However, when the government was about to upgrade the minor district, the name Tha Yang was already given to a district of Phetchaburi province. Thus, when the minor district was upgraded to a full district on 1 April 1961, it was named Thung Yai after one of the tambon of the district.

== Geography ==
Neighboring districts are (from the north clockwise): Tham Phannara, Chawang, Na Bon, Thung Song, Bang Khan of Nakhon Si Thammarat; Lam Thap, Khao Phanom of Krabi province; and Phrasaeng of Surat Thani province.

The important water resource is the Tapi River.

== Administration ==
The district is divided into seven sub-districts (tambons), which are further subdivided into 63 villages (mubans). Tha Yang is a township (thesaban tambon) covering parts of the tambon Tha Yang. There are a further seven tambon administrative organizations (TAO).

No.	Name	Thai name	Villages	Pop.
1.	Tha Yang	ท่ายาง	12	12,931
2.	Thung Sang	ทุ่งสัง	7	5,100
3.	Thung Yai	ทุ่งใหญ่	10	9,266
4.	Kurae	กุแหระ	8	7,088
5.	Prik	ปริก	9	15,043
6.	Bang Rup	บางรูป	9	7,933
7.	Krung Yan	กรุงหยัน	8	9,841

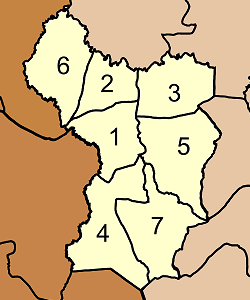
