= Khlong Thom district =

Khlong Thom คลองท่อม
- District
- District location in Krabi province
- Coordinates: 7°57′12″N 99°8′42″E
- Country: Thailand
- Province: Krabi
- Seat: Khlong Thom

Area
  - Total: 1,042.531 km^{2} (402.523 sq mi)

Population (2008)
  - Total: 70,337
  - Density: 67.5/km^{2} (175/sq mi)
- Time zone: UTC+7 (ICT)
- Postal code: 81120
- Geocode: 8104

Khlong Thom (Thai: คลองท่อม, pronounced [kʰlɔ̄ːŋ tʰɔ̂m]) is a district (amphoe) in Krabi province, Thailand.

== Geography ==
Neighboring districts are (from the west clockwise): Ko Lanta, Nuea Khlong, Khao Phanom, and Lam Thap of Krabi Province, and Wang Wiset and Sikao of Trang province. To the southwest is the Andaman Sea.

== History ==
In 1917, the district's name was changed from Khlong Phon (คลองพล) to Khlong Thom.

== Administration ==
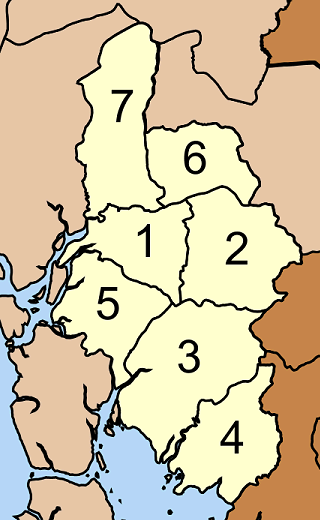
Map of districts

The district is divided into seven sub-districts (tambons), which are further subdivided into 67 villages (mubans). There are two sub-district municipalities (thesaban tambons): Khlong Thom Tai and Khlong Phon, each covering parts of the same-named tambons. Each tambon has a tambon administrative organization (TAO), responsible for the area not belonging to any of the municipalities.

No.	Name	Thai	Villages	Pop.
1.	Khlong Thom Tai	คลองท่อมใต้	9	11,686
2.	Khlong Thom Nuea	คลองท่อมเหนือ	8	5,877
3.	Khlong Phon	คลองพน	14	18,384
4.	Sai Khao	ทรายขาว	7	10,092
5.	Huai Nam Khao	ห้วยน้ำขาว	10	8,636
6.	Phru Din Na	พรุดินนา	10	9,833
7.	Phela	เพหลา	9	5,829

== Environment ==
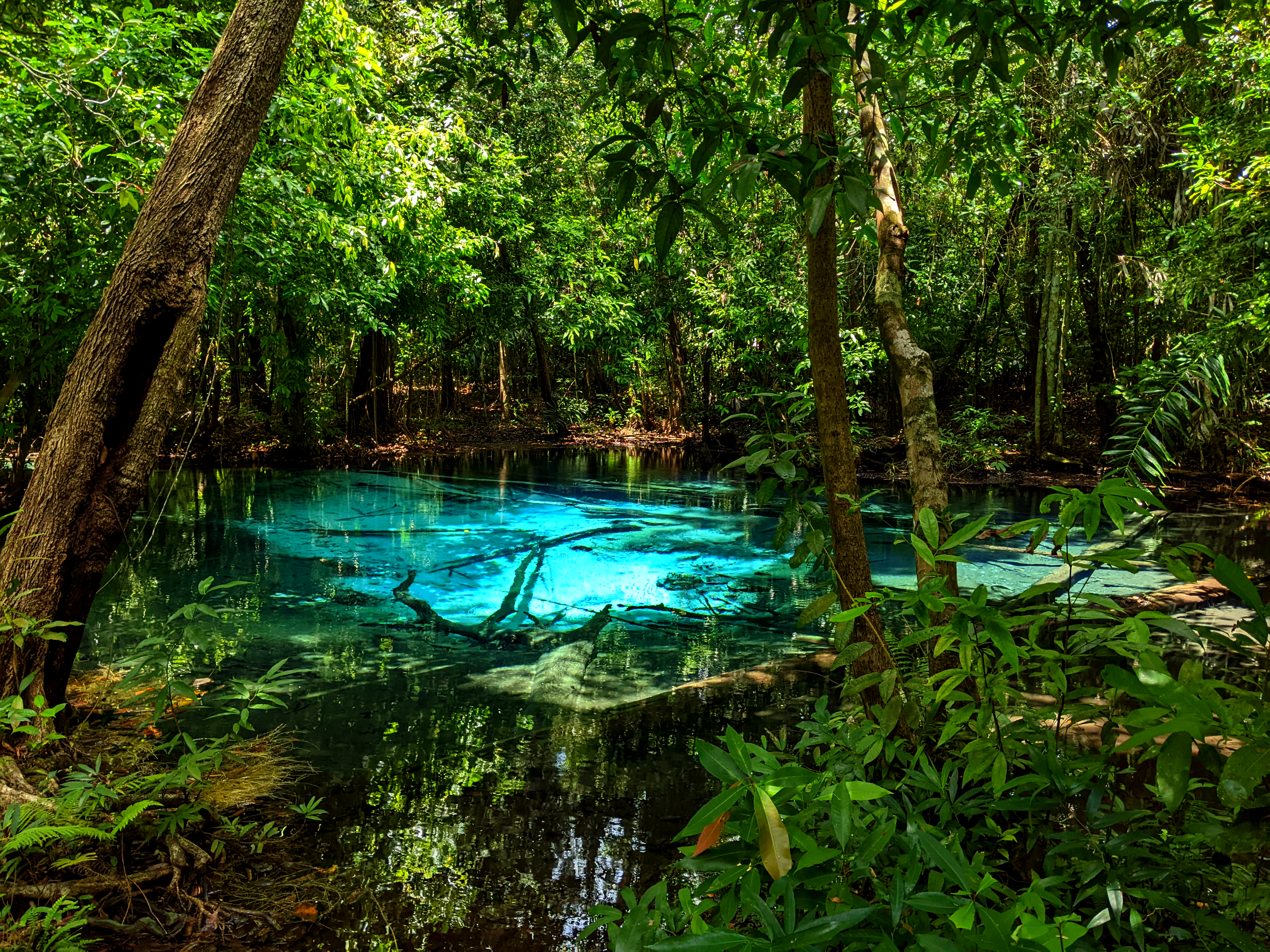
Blue Pool, Khlong Thom Nuea, Khlong Thom District, Krabi Province, Thailand

The residents of tambon Klong Phon's Ban Tha Maphrao community were the recipients of the 2018 Mechai Viravaidya Award. The award, funded by the Stock Exchange of Thailand Foundation, honours communities for outstanding social development initiatives. The award was granted for the community's reforestation of several thousand rai of mangrove forest destroyed years earlier by shrimp farmers. Today, about 70 percent of community residents, over 2,000 people, are able to earn around 500 baht per day by selling mangrove crabs, black crabs, and other marine life they catch in the forest or local waters.
