= Chang Klang district =

District of Thailand

Chang Klang ช้างกลาง
- District
- District location in Nakhon Si Thammarat province
- Coordinates: 8°22′27″N 99°34′5″E
- Country: Thailand
- Province: Nakhon Si Thammarat
- Seat: Chang Klang

Area
  - Total: 232.5 km^{2} (89.8 sq mi)

Population (2005)
  - Total: 29,594
  - Density: 127.3/km^{2} (330/sq mi)
- Time zone: UTC+7 (ICT)
- Postal code: 80250
- Geocode: 8022

Chang Klang (Thai: ช้างกลาง, pronounced [t͡ɕʰáːŋ klāːŋ]) is a district (amphoe) of Nakhon Si Thammarat province, southern Thailand.

== History ==
The district was created on 15 July 1996 by splitting the three southeastern tambons from Chawang district.

On 15 May 2007, all 81 minor districts were upgraded to full districts. On 24 August, the upgrade became official.

== Geography ==
Neighboring districts are (from the north clockwise): Chawang, Lan Saka, Thung Song, and Na Bon.

== Administration ==
The district is divided into three sub-districts (tambons), which are further subdivided into 35 villages (mubans). There are no municipal (thesaban) areas, and three tambon administrative organizations (TAO).

No.	Name	Thai name	Villages	Pop.
1.	Chang Klang	ช้างกลาง	17	16,989
2.	Lak Chang	หลักช้าง	10	7,581
3.	Suan Khan	สวนขัน	18	5,024

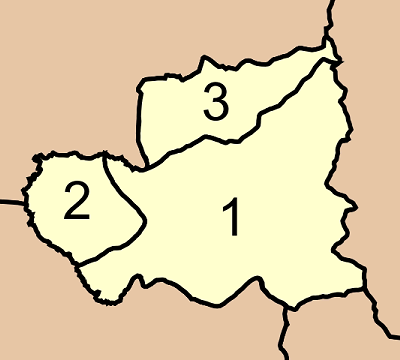

== Important places ==
- Rubber Authority of Thailand Central Southern Region
- Agricultural tourism center, Chang Klang district
