= Chawang district =

Chawang ฉวาง
- District
- District location in Nakhon Si Thammarat province
- Coordinates: 8°25′34″N 99°30′17″E
- Country: Thailand
- Province: Nakhon Si Thammarat
- Seat: Chawang

Area
  - Total: 528.2 km^{2} (203.9 sq mi)

Population (2021)
  - Total: 65,414
  - Density: 123.84/km^{2} (320.7/sq mi)
- Time zone: UTC+7 (ICT)
- Postal code: 80150
- Geocode: 8004

Chawang (Thai: ฉวาง, pronounced [t͡ɕʰā.wǎːŋ]) is a district (amphoe) of Nakhon Si Thammarat province, southern Thailand.

== Geography ==
Neighboring districts are (from the northeast clockwise): Phipun, Lan Saka, Chang Klang, Na Bon, Thung Yai, and Tham Phannara of Nakhon Si Thammarat; Wiang Sa of Surat Thani province.

The east of the district is part of the Khao Luang National Park.

== Climate ==
Climate data for Chawang (1981–2010, extremes 1995-present)
Month	Jan	Feb	Mar	Apr	May	Jun	Jul	Aug	Sep	Oct	Nov	Dec	Year
Record high °C (°F)	37.5 (99.5)	39.5 (103.1)	39.8 (103.6)	41.1 (106.0)	40.6 (105.1)	38.2 (100.8)	36.5 (97.7)	36.2 (97.2)	35.4 (95.7)	36.2 (97.2)	38.3 (100.9)	35.5 (95.9)	41.0 (105.8)
Mean daily maximum °C (°F)	32.8 (91.0)	34.6 (94.3)	35.3 (95.5)	35.5 (95.9)	33.8 (92.8)	32.9 (91.2)	32.6 (90.7)	32.6 (90.7)	32.5 (90.5)	31.8 (89.2)	31.4 (88.5)	31.5 (88.7)	33.1 (91.6)
Daily mean °C (°F)	26.2 (79.2)	27.2 (81.0)	27.9 (82.2)	28.3 (82.9)	27.6 (81.7)	27.3 (81.1)	26.9 (80.4)	27.1 (80.8)	26.9 (80.4)	26.4 (79.5)	26.3 (79.3)	25.9 (78.6)	27.0 (80.6)
Mean daily minimum °C (°F)	20.7 (69.3)	20.3 (68.5)	21.2 (70.2)	22.1 (71.8)	22.8 (73.0)	22.7 (72.9)	22.5 (72.5)	22.5 (72.5)	22.6 (72.7)	22.7 (72.9)	22.4 (72.3)	21.5 (70.7)	22.0 (71.6)
Record low °C (°F)	15.0 (59.0)	15.5 (59.9)	16.2 (61.2)	17.7 (63.9)	17.5 (63.5)	19.5 (67.1)	19.2 (66.6)	19.0 (66.2)	19.5 (67.1)	16.8 (62.2)	17.7 (63.9)	16.5 (61.7)	15.0 (59.0)
Average rainfall mm (inches)	38.4 (1.51)	39.0 (1.54)	116.9 (4.60)	105.4 (4.15)	206.2 (8.12)	187.8 (7.39)	192.1 (7.56)	220.0 (8.66)	243.0 (9.57)	221.6 (8.72)	203.9 (8.03)	120.6 (4.75)	1,894.9 (74.60)
Average rainy days	7.6	3.9	9.9	12.2	18.2	17.8	19.3	20.0	20.8	24.0	17.5	12.5	183.7
Average relative humidity (%)	80	75	76	79	84	85	86	85	86	87	87	84	83
Mean monthly sunshine hours	198.4	180.8	201.5	183.0	155.0	150.0	114.7	151.9	144.0	108.5	138.0	142.6	1,868.4
Mean daily sunshine hours	6.4	6.4	6.5	6.1	5.0	5.0	3.7	4.9	4.8	3.5	4.6	4.6	5.1
Source 1: Thai Meteorological Department, Meteomanz (record)
Source 2: Office of Water Management and Hydrology, Royal Irrigation Department (sun and humidity)

== Administration ==
The district is divided into 10 sub-districts (tambons), which are further subdivided into 84 villages (mubans). There are three subdistrict municipalities (thesaban tambons): Chan Di covers tambon Chan Di, and Chawang and Mai Riang each cover parts of the same-named tambons. There are a further 10 tambon administrative organizations (TAO).

No.	Name	Thai name	Villages	Pop.
1.	Chawang	ฉวาง	9	7,056
3.	La-ai	ละอาย	15	11,484
4.	Na Wae	นาแว	12	7,311
5.	Mai Riang	ไม้เรียง	10	7,769
6.	Kabiat	กะเปียด	3	3,960
7.	Na Kacha	นากะชะ	7	4,807
9.	Huai Prik	ห้วยปริก	7	6,177
10.	Saira	ไสหร้า	10	7,054
15.	Na Khliang	นาเขลียง	6	2,825
16.	Chan Di	จันดี	5	7,344

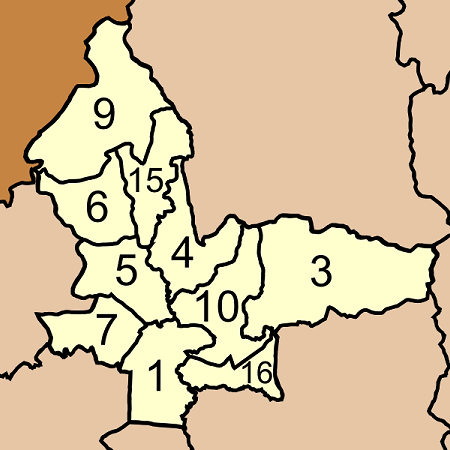

Missing numbers are now part of Tham Phannara and Chang Klang Districts.
