= Khlong Phraya Banlue =

Canal in central Thailand

Coordinates: 14.15906°N 100.12711°E

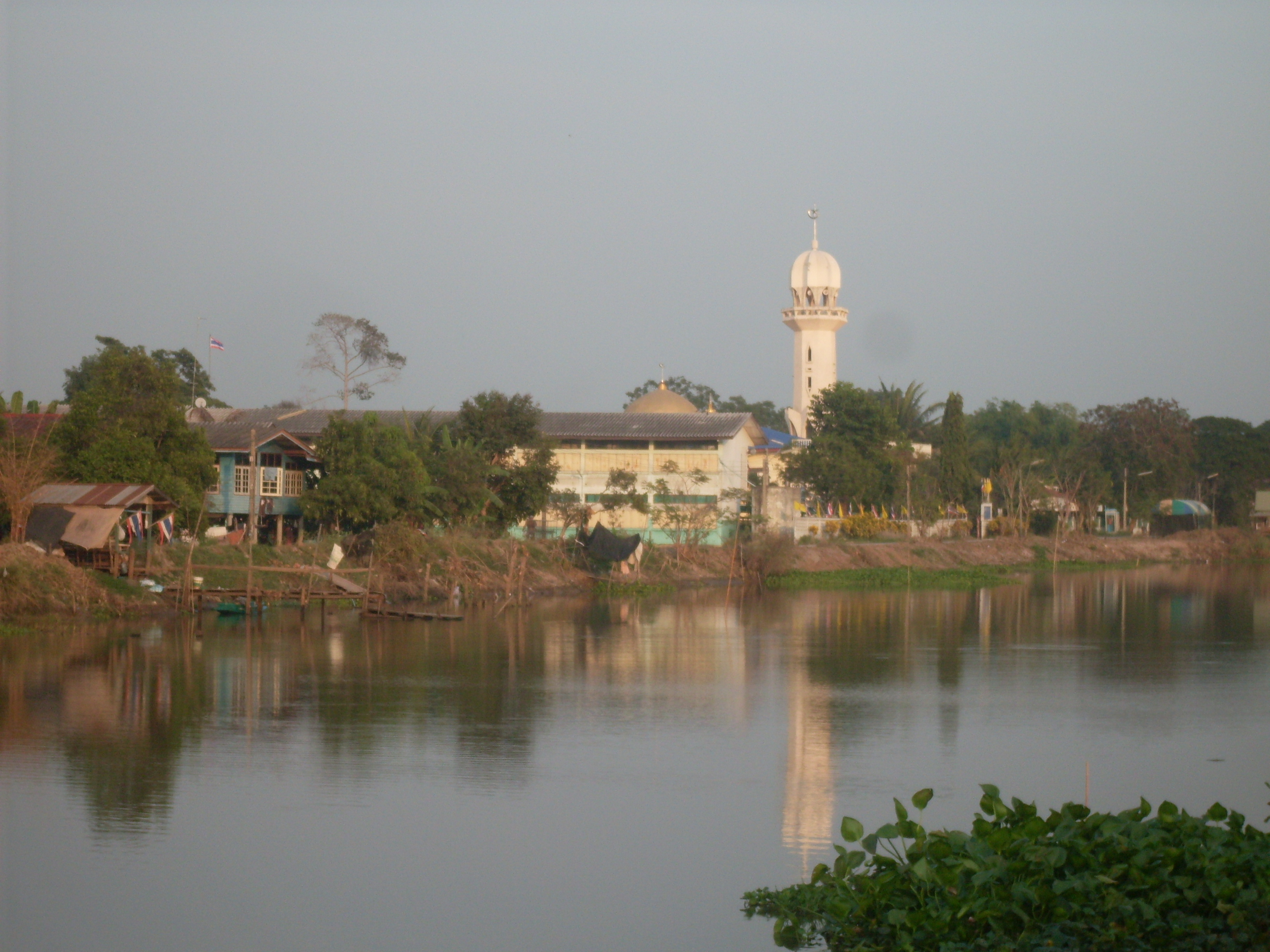
Khlong Phraya Banlue and Masjid Ahmadeeyah, Lat Bua Luang

Khlong Phraya Banlue (Thai: คลองพระยาบรรลือ, pronounced [kʰlɔ̄ːŋ pʰrá.jāː bān lɯ̄ː]) is a khlong (canal) in central Thailand.

== History ==
Dug during the fifth reign, the canal provides irrigation in six districts of three provinces; Lat Lum Kaeo, and Sam Khok in Pathum Thani province; Bang Sai, Sena, and Lat Bua Luang in Phra Nakhon Si Ayutthaya province. It empties into the Tha Chin river in Song Phi Nong, Suphan Buri province, a distance of 42 km (26.1 mi).

All along its route in the area of Lat Bua Luang are Muslim communities centred around their masjids. The people are mostly farmers with fields and orchards. Many also raise fish and prawn in big ponds.
