= Thap Ti Lek =

Coordinates: 14.437352°N 100.110059°E

Thap Ti Lek (Thai: ทับตีเหล็ก) is a tambon (subdistrict) of Mueang Suphan Buri district, capital district of Suphan Buri province, central Thailand.

== History & toponymy ==
Its name "Thap Ti Lek" means "blacksmith's settlement". Legendarily, in the middle Ayutthaya period King Naresuan raised the army to fight with the Burmese army in the area of present-day Don Chedi district. During a stopover at Si Prachan district, he has chosen the Wat Manao temple as a troop hiding place. By allowing locals to bring different types of metal to melt into various weapons such as spears, swords, pikes, halberds. Since then, the place where the temple is located has been called "Thap Ti Lek" onwards.

== Geography ==
Thap Ti Lek is about 4 km (2.5 mi) south of the Mueang Suphan Buri district office. It has a total area of about 21 km^{2} (about 1,3125 rais).

Most of the area is lowland, there are some parts in the uplands. Tha Chin river runs through and formed a boundary between Thap Ti Lek and Tha Rahat.

Neighbouring subdistricts are (from the north clockwise): Rua Yai, Tha Rahat, Bang Pla Ma of Bang Pla Ma district, Don Kamyan.

== Administration ==
=== Central administration ===
The entire area is under the administration of Thap Ti Lek Subdistrict Administrative Organization.

=== Local administration ===
Thap Ti Lek also consists of 5 administrative mubans (village).

No.	Name	Thai
1.	Ban Thap Ti Lek	บ้านทับตีเหล็ก
2.	Ban Prasop Sook	บ้านประสพสุข
3.	Ban Tha Din Neaow	บ้านท่าดินเหนียว
4.	Ban Pho Khiao	บ้านโพธิ์เขียว
5.	Ban Don Ban	บ้านดอนบ้าน

== Population ==
The area has a total population of 3,950 people (1,749 males, 2,201 females) in 1,130 households.

== Transportation ==
The main transport routes are Highway 3310 and Highway 3593 (Tha Din Neaow – Sao Thong). It is served by some local buses.

== Places ==
- Wat Manao
- Wat Prasop Sook
