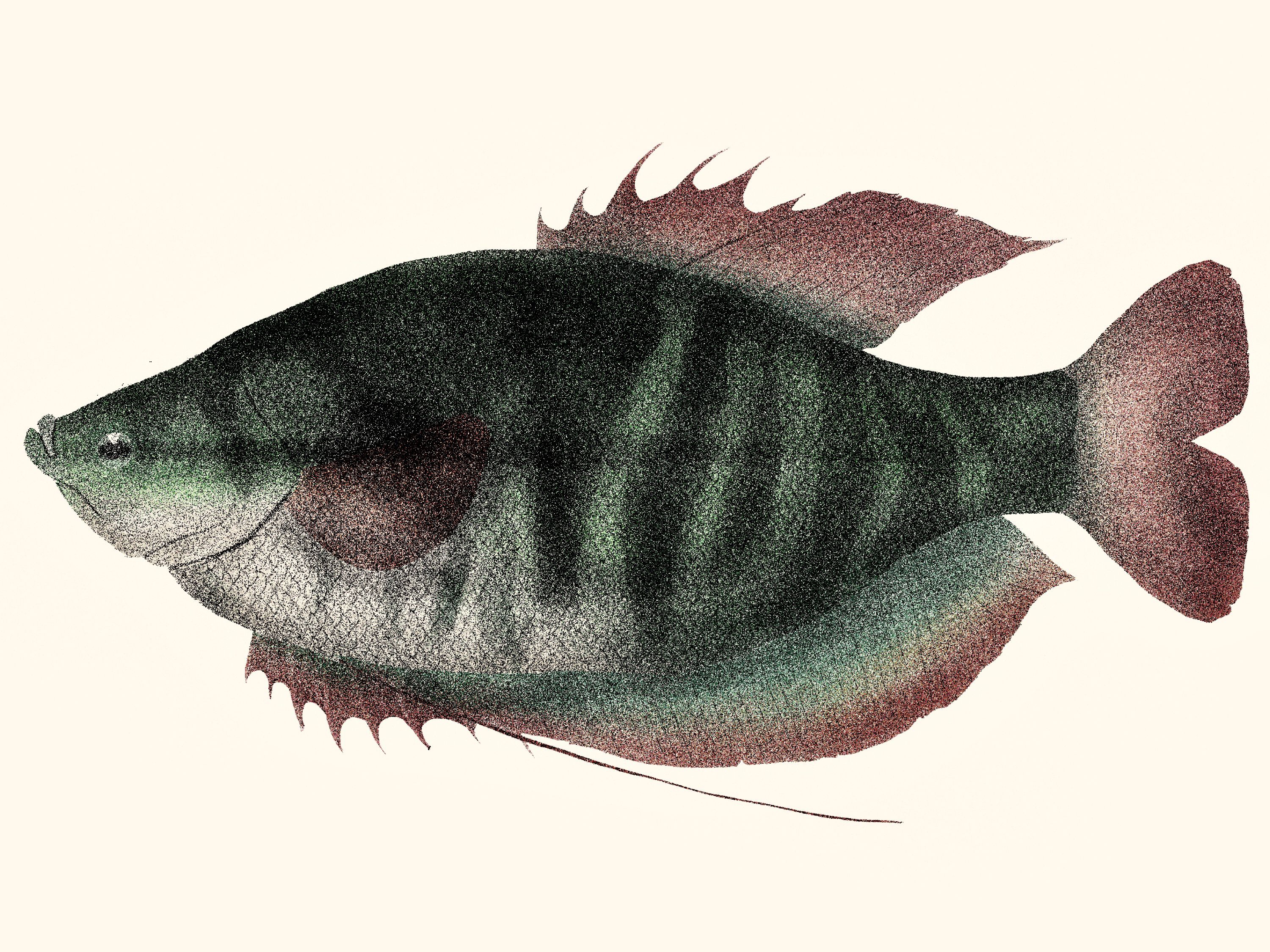
- Depiction of an individual from the Illustrated collection of fishes from Asia, Africa and Australia

Conservation status
- Least Concern (IUCN 3.1)

Scientific classification
- Kingdom: Animalia
- Phylum: Chordata
- Class: Actinopterygii
- Order: Anabantiformes
- Family: Osphronemidae
- Genus: Trichopodus
- Species: T. pectoralis

Binomial name
- Trichopodus pectoralis Regan, 1910

Synonyms
- Trichogaster pectoralis (Regan, 1910)

= Snakeskin gourami =

Species of fish

The snakeskin gourami (Trichopodus pectoralis) is a species of gourami native to Southeast Asia. Prior to the merging of Belontidae to the family Osphronemidae, the snakeskin gourami was regarded as the largest member of its family. It is still the largest species in its genus and subfamily.

== Etymology ==
The name Trichopodus comes from the Ancient Greek words θρίξ (thríx) which means hair and πούς (poús) which means foot while pectoralis comes from the Latin words pectus which means "chest" and ālis which means "of or pertaining to", refers to the large pectoral fins of the species.

== Physical characteristics ==
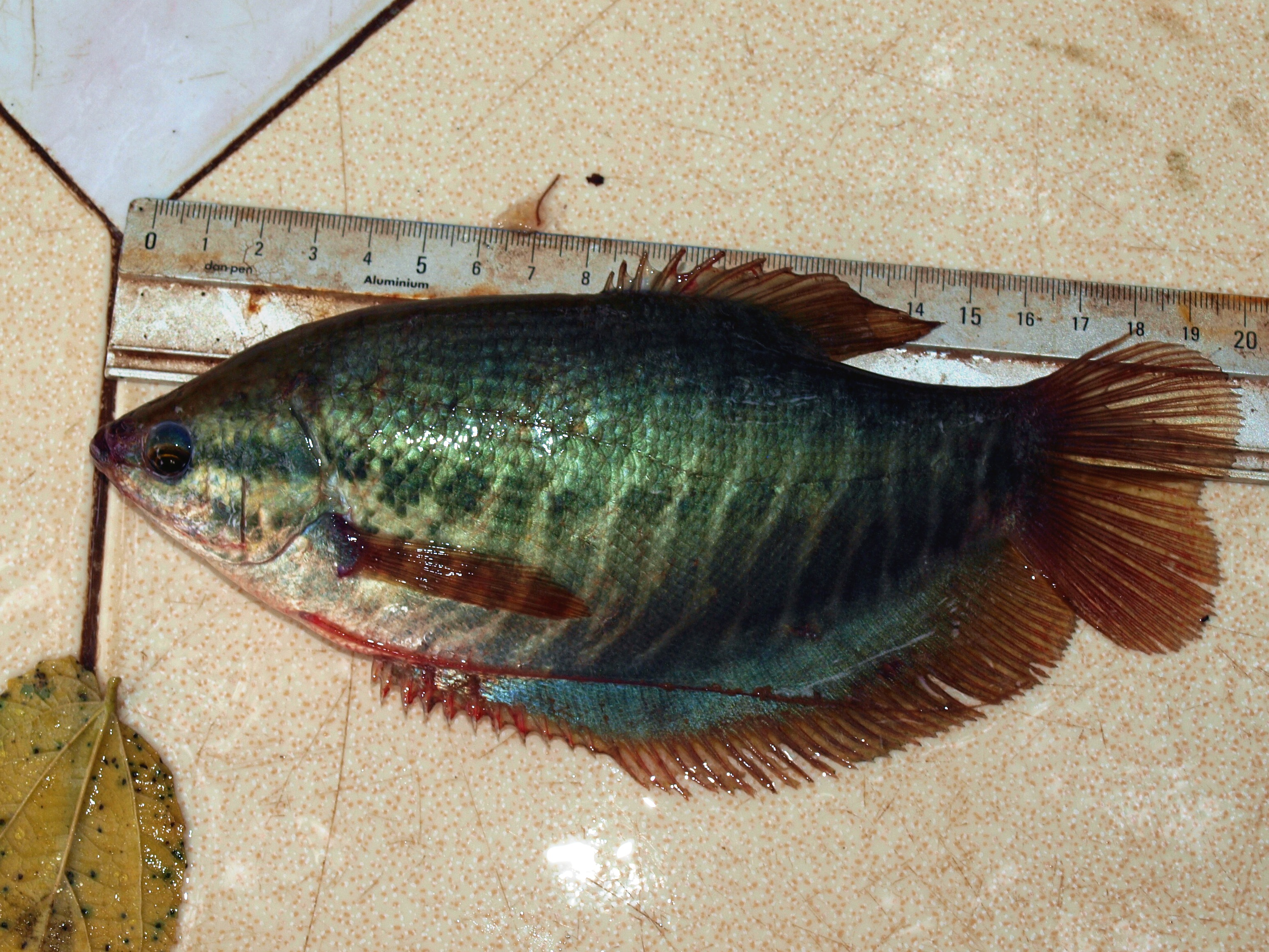
A large individual measuring approximately 19.5 centimetres

The snakeskin gourami is an elongated, moderately compressed fish with a small dorsal fin. Its anal fin is nearly the length of the body and the pelvic fins are long and thread-like. The back is olive in color and the flanks are greenish gray with a silver iridescence. An obvious, irregular black band extends from the snout, through the eye, and to the caudal peduncle. The underparts are white. The rear part of the body may be marked with faint transverse stripes. The fins are also gray-green, and the iris of the eye may be amber under favorable water conditions. The dorsal fins of male fish are pointed and the pelvic fins are orange to red. The males are also slimmer than the less colorful females. Juvenile snakeskin gouramis have strikingly strong zig-zag lines from the eye to the base of the tail.

This species can grow up to 25 centimetres (9.8 in) TL in length though most only reach about 15 centimetres (5.9 in).

== Distribution and habitat ==
They are common in the Mekong and Chao Phraya basin of, Thailand mainly, Southern Vietnam, Laos, and lastly Cambodia. They have also been introduced in the Philippines, Malaysia, Indonesia, Singapore, Papua New Guinea, Sri Lanka, and New Caledonia.

Snakeskin gourami are found in rice paddies, shallow ponds, and swamps. They are found in shallow, sluggish, or standing water habitats with a lot of aquatic vegetation. It also occurs in flooded forests of the lower Mekong, and gradually moves back to rivers as floodwaters recede.

== Ecology ==
Snakeskin gourami generally feeds on aquatic insects and other small living organisms in its habitat. Like other labyrinth fish, it can breathe air directly, as well as absorb oxygen from water through its gills.

== Relationship to humans ==
Capture (blue) and aquaculture (green) production of Snakeskin gourami (Trichopodus pectoralis) in thousand tonnes from 1950 to 2022, as reported by the FAO

Compared to other gourami species, the snakeskin gourami is less frequently sold as aquarium fish but is more commonly used as food fish in their native lands. The snakeskin gourami is a highly economical species that is captured and cultured for food and for export for the aquarium trade. It is one of the five most important aquacultured freshwater species in Thailand. Its flesh is sweet and of good quality, and may be fried, grilled or used for fish soup, like tom yam. In Thailand, there is a trade of dried snakeskin gourami for the benefit of people in areas where the live fish is not available.

Famous areas for snakeskin gourami farming in Thailand are Bang Bo and Bang Phli Districts in Samut Prakan Province with Don Kamyan Sub-District in Mueang Suphan Buri District, Suphan Buri Province, but the area with the largest number of farms is Ban Phaeo District, Samut Sakhon Province. All of these are in the central region.

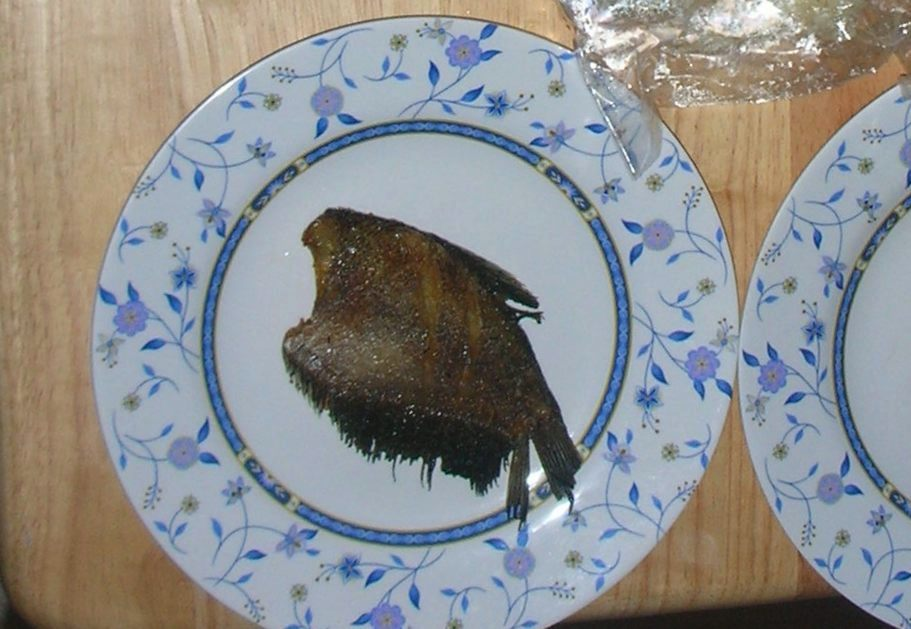
Fried snakeskin gourami from Thailand

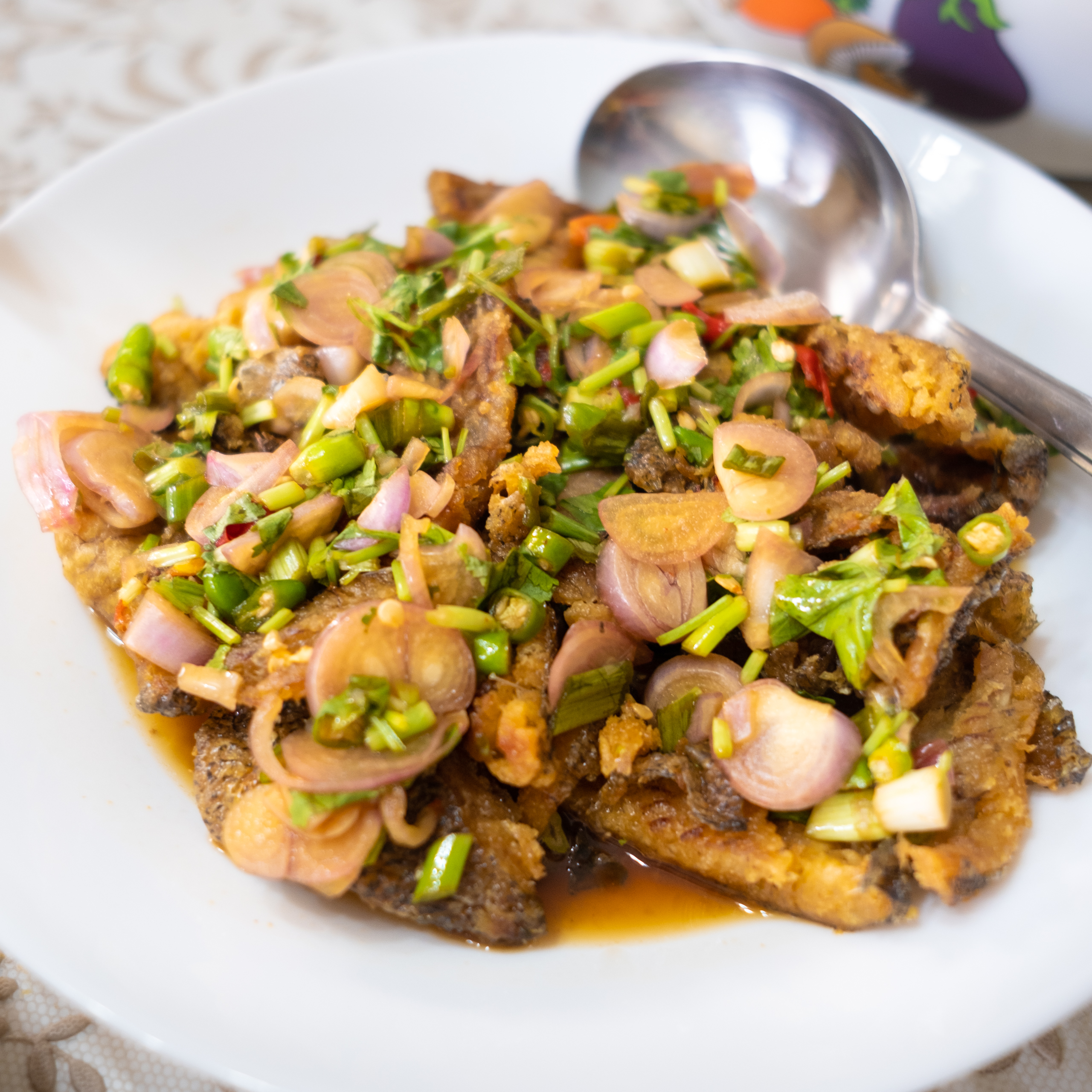
Yam pla salit, a Thai salad made with deep-fried, sun-dried snakeskin gourami

== Diseases ==
Several pathogens have been reported from cultured populations of T. pectoralis:

- Bacteria. Outbreaks of streptococcosis in farmed stocks have been attributed to Streptococcus suis; isolates from diseased fish were confirmed by molecular assays, and experimental challenges demonstrated high lethality.
- Chlamydiales–myxozoan co-infection. A novel chlamydia-like organism, proposed as "Candidatus Piscichlamydia trichopodus", was described in co-infection with Henneguya sp. (Myxozoa) in gill and connective tissues; agents were demonstrated by histopathology, in situ hybridization, and 16S rRNA sequencing.
- Parasites. Encysted metacercariae of Posthodiplostomum sp. (Digenea: Diplostomidae) produce subepidermal nodules that cause a characteristic "lumpy skin" appearance in cultured fingerlings; this was the first record of the parasite in this host.
- Viruses. Natural infections with infectious spleen and kidney necrosis virus (ISKNV; genus Megalocytivirus) have been reported in T. pectoralis (and sympatric T. trichopterus) reared in the same ponds, with clinical signs including skin haemorrhage and cumulative mortality exceeding 60%.

Additional reports in the literature include susceptibility to epizootic ulcerative syndrome caused by Aphanomyces invadans under experimental challenge, pathology associated with migrating metacercariae of Clinostomum piscidium in farmed stocks, and outbreaks of Streptococcus agalactiae serotype VII with high mortality in intensive culture.

== In the aquarium ==
Trichopodus pectoralis are a hardy species recommended for a beginner in the fishkeeping hobby because, despite growing to a relatively large size, they are peaceful fish that can be kept in a community tank. They can be mixed with barbs, danios, tetras, Corydoras, angelfish, loaches, Loricariids and other gourami.

A snakeskin gourami is a bottom and middle tank level dweller. It requires at least a 36 inches (91 cm) length aquarium. A normal specimen should be kept in at least a 36-inch (91 cm) or 40 U.S. gallons (150 liters) tank to help them grow and thrive in a regular conditions, as a minimum tank size. The recommended pH is 5.8 to 8.5 with a water hardness of 2 to 30 dH and a temperature of 72 to 86 °F (22 to 30 °C). A snakeskin gourami can grow up to 8 inches (20 cm) in captivity and its spawns are also unusually large.

Snakeskin gouramies, being omnivores, eat live food such as Tubifex worms, insects, insect larvae and crustaceans. They also consume flakes, pellets, chopped spinach and lettuce. They are not picky and will accept any food offered.

Breeding snakeskin gourami is not difficult. They will breed when they reach 5 inches (13 cm) length. It is the most prolific among all the gourami species. There can be as many as 5,000 fry from a single spawning period. The males are relatively nonaggressive, even at spawning times, which is unlike other labyrinth fishes. The parents will also not eat the fry. Fry can be raised by feeding progressively larger flake foods, in accordance with the size of the fry; occasionally feeding of live foods such as newly hatched brine shrimp is a welcome change in their diet. During breeding, like some of other labyrinth species, snakeskin gouramies are observed to vocalize sounds described as croaking, growling or cracking tones, to demonstrate territorial behavior.
