= Don Kamyan =

Don Kamyan ดอนกำยาน
- Tambon
- Location within Thailand
- Coordinates: 14°27′38.3″N 100°04′43.9″E
- Country: Thailand
- Province: Suphan Buri
- Amphoe: Mueang Suphan Buri
- Named after: Frankincense ivy

Government
  - Mayor: Apisak Joradoln

Area
  - Total: 30.213 km^{2} (11.665 sq mi)
- Time zone: UTC+7 (Thailand)
- Postal code: 72000
- Website: http://www.donkumyan.go.th/th/

Don Kamyan (Thai: ดอนกำยาน, pronounced [dɔ̄ːn kām.jāːn]) is a tambon (subdistrict) of Mueang Suphan Buri district, capital district of Suphan Buri province.

== History and toponymy ==
The name "Don Kamyan" literally translated as "upland of frankincenses." Because the area of Suphan Buri in the past was a flood plain. There are some parts that are upland. Don Kamyan is an upland area of about 300 rais (118 acres) that does not reach the flood. There were many frankincense plants. Hence the name "Kok Kamyan" (โคกกำยาน, pronounced [kʰôːk.kām.jāːn], lit "mound of frankincenses").

Later, when the status was raised to a subdistrict therefore changed its name to "Don Kamyan" as it is today.

== Geography ==
Most of the areas are plains and some parts are upland. Khlong Don Kamyan canal flowing through the area in the north–south direction. There is an irrigation canal as an important local water resource.

It borders Ban Pho in its district to the north, Rua Yai and Thap Ti Lek in its district to the east, Ban Sakae Yang Mu of Makham Lom in Bang Pla Ma district to the south, and Don Pho Thong in its district to the west.

Don Kamyan is about 6 km (3.7 mi) west of downtown Suphan Buri.

== Administration ==
=== Central administration ===
The entire area is under the administration of Subdistrict Administrative Organization (SAO) Don Kamyan.

=== Local administration ===
Don Kamyan was also divided into nine administrative mubans (villages).

No.	Name	Thai
1.	Ban U Ya	บ้านอู่ยา
2.	Ban Bang Pla Mo	บ้านบางปลาหมอ
3.	Ban Sala Daeng	บ้านศาลาแดง
4.	Ban Wang Phranon	บ้านวังพระนอน
5.	Ban Sam Nak	บ้านสามนาค
6.	Ban Pan Tamlueng	บ้านพันตำลึง
7.	Ban Don Kum	บ้านดอนกุ่ม
8.	Ban Khlong Panieng	บ้านคลองพะเนียง
9.	Ban Lang Pratunam	บ้านหลังประตูน้ำ

== Economy ==
Don Kamyan has an important local product, namely dried snakeskin gourami. A breed of snakeskin gourami that are raised in present-day Samut Prakan's Bang Bo including Samut Sakhon's Ban Phaeo. Their ancestors are the Don Kamyan snakeskin gourami strain.

== Places ==
- Suphan Buri Provincial Stadium
- Wat Wang Phra Non Temple
- Wat Bang Pla Mo Temple
