= Lat Bua Luang district =

Lat Bua Luang ลาดบัวหลวง
- District
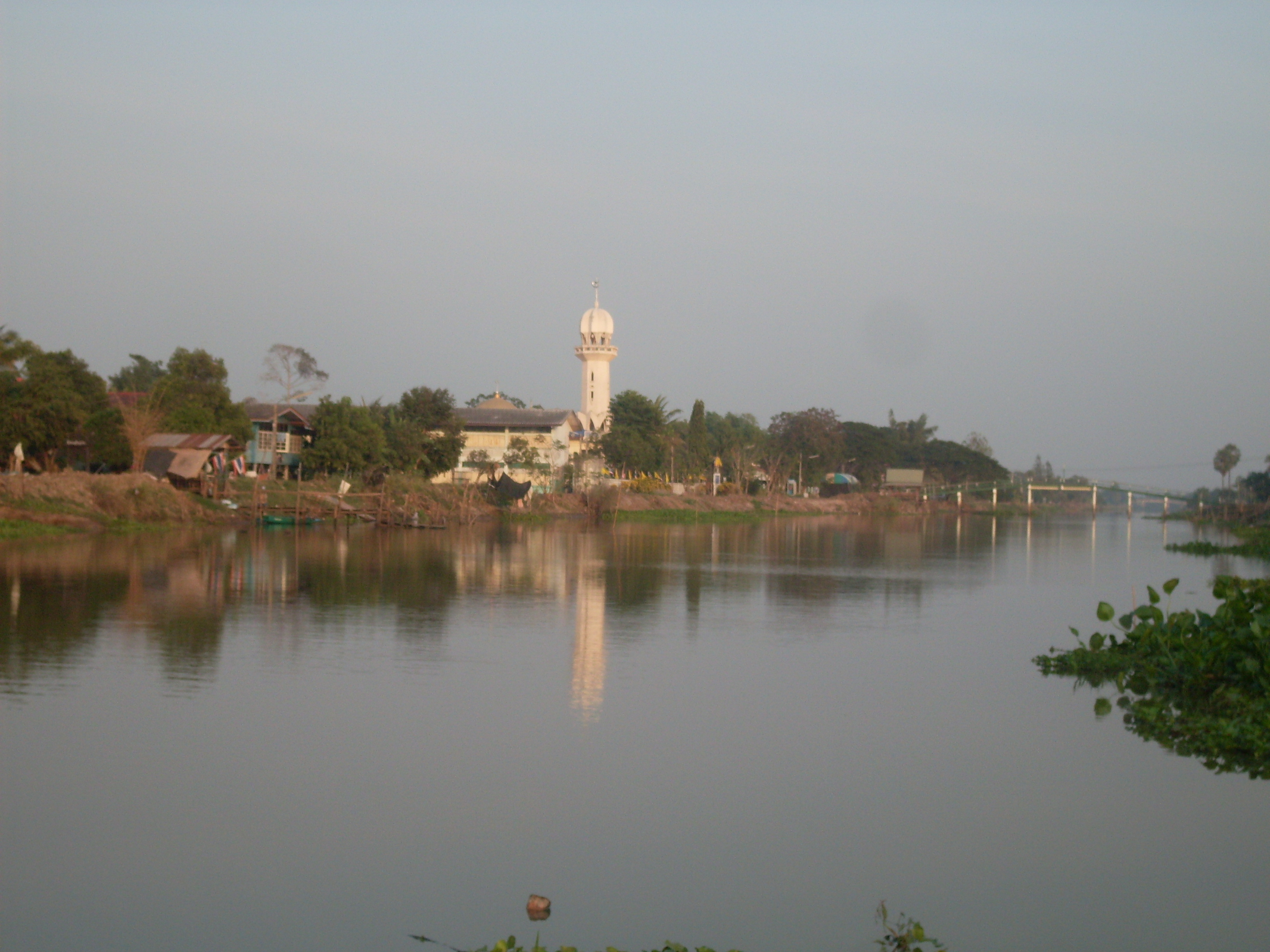
- Khlong Phraya Banlue

- District location in Ayutthaya province
- Coordinates: 14°9′57″N 100°18′27″E
- Country: Thailand
- Province: Ayutthaya
- Seat: Lat Bua Luang
- Tambon: 7

Area
  - Total: 199.9 km^{2} (77.2 sq mi)

Population (2000)
  - Total: 36,186
  - Density: 181/km^{2} (470/sq mi)
- Time zone: UTC+7 (ICT)
- Postal code: 13230
- Geocode: 1410

Lat Bua Luang (Thai: ลาดบัวหลวง, pronounced [lâːt būa̯ lǔa̯ŋ]) is a district (amphoe) in the southern part of Ayutthaya province, central Thailand.

== History ==
Tambon Lat Bua Luang was separated from Amphoe Bang Sai and officially upgraded to a district in 1947.

== Geography ==
Neighbouring districts are (from the north clockwise) Bang Sai (บางซ้าย), Sena, and Bang Sai (บางไทร) of Ayutthaya Province, Sam Khok and Lat Lum Kaeo of Pathum Thani province, Sai Noi of Nonthaburi province, Bang Len of Nakhon Pathom province, and Song Phi Nong of Suphanburi province.

== Administration ==
The district is divided into seven sub-districts (tambon). Lat Bua Luang is a township (thesaban tambon) covering parts of the tambon Lat Bua Luang.

1.	Lat Bua Luang	ลาดบัวหลวง
2.	Lakchai	หลักชัย
3.	Sam Mueang	สามเมือง
4.	Phraya Banlue	พระยาบันลือ
5.	Singhanat	สิงหนาท
6.	Khu Salot	คู้สลอด
7.	Khlong Phraya Banlue	คลองพระยาบันลือ
