= Bang Sai district (1413) =

Bang Sai บางซ้าย
- District
- District location in Phra Nakhon Si Ayutthaya province
- Coordinates: 14°19′12″N 100°18′0″E
- Country: Thailand
- Province: Ayutthaya
- Seat: Bang Sai

Area
  - Total: 150.756 km^{2} (58.207 sq mi)

Population (2007)
  - Total: 19,579
  - Density: 129.9/km^{2} (336/sq mi)
- Time zone: UTC+7 (ICT)
- Postal code: 13270
- Geocode: 1413

Bang Sai (Thai: บางซ้าย, pronounced [bāːŋ sáːj]) is a district (amphoe) in the western part of Phra Nakhon Si Ayutthaya province, central Thailand. There is another district of Ayutthaya which shares the same romanization Bang Sai, but has a different spelling in Thai.

== History ==
The district was created as a minor district (king amphoe) in 1948 with territory taken from Sena district. It was upgraded to a full district in 1958.

== Geography ==
Neighboring districts are (from the north clockwise) Phak Hai, Sena and Lat Bua Luang of Ayutthaya Province, and Bang Pla Ma of Suphanburi province.

== Administration ==
The district is divided into six sub-districts (tambons), which are further subdivided into 53 villages (mubans). The sub-district municipality (thesaban tambon) Bang Sai covers parts of the tambons Bang Sai, Kaeo Fa, and Tao Lao. The non-municipal area is administered by four tambon administrative organizations (TAO).

No.	Name	Thai	Pop.
1.	Bang Sai	บางซ้าย	3,389
2.	Kaeo Fa	แก้วฟ้า	2,429
3.	Tao Lao	เต่าเล่า	2,821
4.	Plai Klat	ปลายกลัด	4,774
5.	Thepphamongkhon	เทพมงคล	3,861
6.	Wang Phatthana	วังพัฒนา	2,305
