= Pho Phraya =

Coordinates: 14.527778°N 100.124722°E

Pho Phraya (Thai: โพธิ์พระยา, pronounced [pʰōː pʰráʔ.jāː]) is a tambon (subdistrict) of Mueang Suphan Buri District, the capital of Suphan Buri Province, central Thailand.

== History ==
Pho Phraya is an ancient area, it is the route of the army during the Ayutthaya period. There are many Bodhi trees (Pho in Thai) here. Therefore, it is often used as a resting place during the march of many generals rank Phraya, some of whom have settled here. Hence the name "Pho Phraya" since then.

Pho Phraya is a tract that has been a thoroughfare for people since ancient times. Tha Chin River (also locally known as Suphan River) flows through thus creating a community and large waterfront marketplace. Pho Phraya was cited in "Nirat Suphan" (Journey to Suphan Buri) in 1831, the travelogue of Sunthorn Phu a renowned poet in the early Rattanakosin period. He described this place as it was a rendezvous of travelers who come from different places by Kwian (cart) and it was filled with various species of plants.

Since in the past, the people of Pho Phraya loved to sing the Likay dance. Therefore, it is well known that all households are almost Likay performer.

== Geography ==
The area of Pho Phraya is a lowland. The River of Tha Chin emptying pass the centre of the area, divide Pho Phraya into two parts and surrounded by irrigation canals. Most of the land is used for agriculture, especially rice farming, followed by fruit orchards such as mango, banana and papaya.

Pho Phraya is the upper part of Mueang Suphan Buri District. It is located about 2.5 km (1.6 mi) from the downtown Suphan Buri.

Its adjoining other subdistricts, clockwise from the north, are Mot Daeng and Wang Yang in Si Prachan District, Don Masang in its district, Sanam Chai and Phihan Daeng with Ban Pho in its district, respectively.

== Administration ==
Pho Phraya is governed by two local administrative bodies.

Pho Phraya Subdistrict Municipality consisting of four parts of the area.

Huai Wang Thong Subdistrict Municipality consisting of rest of the Pho Phraya.

Pho Phraya also consists of 7 muban (village) and in 2013 had population of 6,775 people.

== Transportation ==
National Highway 340, otherwise known as Bang Bua Thong–Suphan Buri Road crosses the centre of the area, it is the main road. Suphan Buri Ring Road passes through the western side of the Pho Phraya.

== Places ==
- Pho Phraya Market
- Wat Worachan
- Wat Phrao
- Boromarajonani College of Nursing Suphan Buri

== Local products ==
- Hand woven hammock
- Hand woven doormat
