= Phak Hai district =

Phak Hai ผักไห่
- District
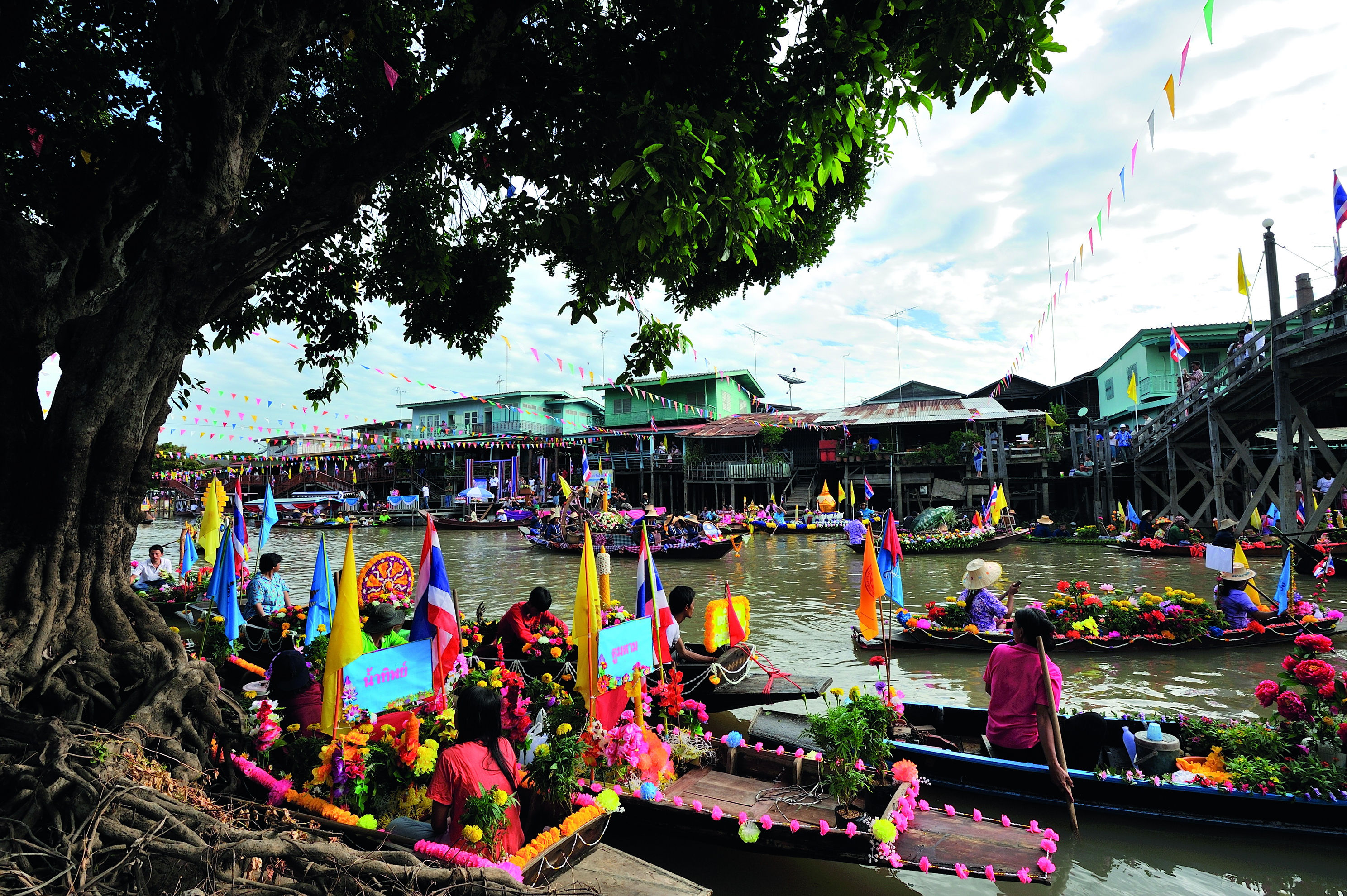
- Lad Chado Market, a local floating market

- District location in Ayutthaya province
- Coordinates: 14°27′30″N 100°22′12″E
- Country: Thailand
- Province: Ayutthaya
- Seat: Phak Hai
- Tambon: 16

Area
  - Total: 189.0 km^{2} (73.0 sq mi)

Population (2000)
  - Total: 44,436
  - Density: 235.1/km^{2} (609/sq mi)
- Time zone: UTC+7 (ICT)
- Postal code: 13120
- Geocode: 1408

Phak Hai (Thai: ผักไห่, pronounced [pʰàk hàj]) is a district (amphoe) in the northwestern part of Ayutthaya province, central Thailand.

== History ==
Historically, the district was named Khwaeng Sena Yai, which became converted to an amphoe at the end of the 19th century. In 1917, the name of district was changed to be Phak Hai after the central tambon.

The name Phak Hai comes from the Nirat Suphan by Sunthorn Phu, which refers to a village named Ban Pak Hai. The spelling has changed however now, so it can also mean a kind of plant (Momordica charantia) that grows in swamps.

== Geography ==
Neighboring districts are (from the north clockwise) Wiset Chai Chan and Pa Mok of Ang Thong province; Bang Ban, Sena, and Bang Sai of Ayutthaya Province; and Bang Pla Ma, and Mueang Suphanburi of Suphanburi province.

== Administration ==
The district is divided into 16 sub-districts (tambon), which are further subdivided into 128 villages (muban).

1.	Phak Hai	ผักไห่
2.	Ammarit	อมฤต
3.	Ban Khae	บ้านแค
4.	Lat Nam Khem	ลาดน้ำเค็ม
5.	Talan	ตาลาน
6.	Tha Din Daeng	ท่าดินแดง
7.	Don Lan	ดอนลาน
8.	Na Khu	นาคู
9.	Kudi	กุฎี
10.	Lam Takhian	ลำตะเคียน
11.	Khok Chang	โคกช้าง
12.	Chakkarat	จักราช
13.	Nong Nam Yai	หนองน้ำใหญ่
14.	Lat Chit	ลาดชิด
15.	Na Khok	หน้าโคก
16.	Ban Yai	บ้านใหญ่

== In media ==
Phak Hai is the setting of a Thai country song, (luk thung), titled (Thai: สาวผักไห่; RTGS: sao phak hai) 'Phak Hai Girl'). It has been popular since around 1970s.
