= Sena district =

Sena เสนา
- District
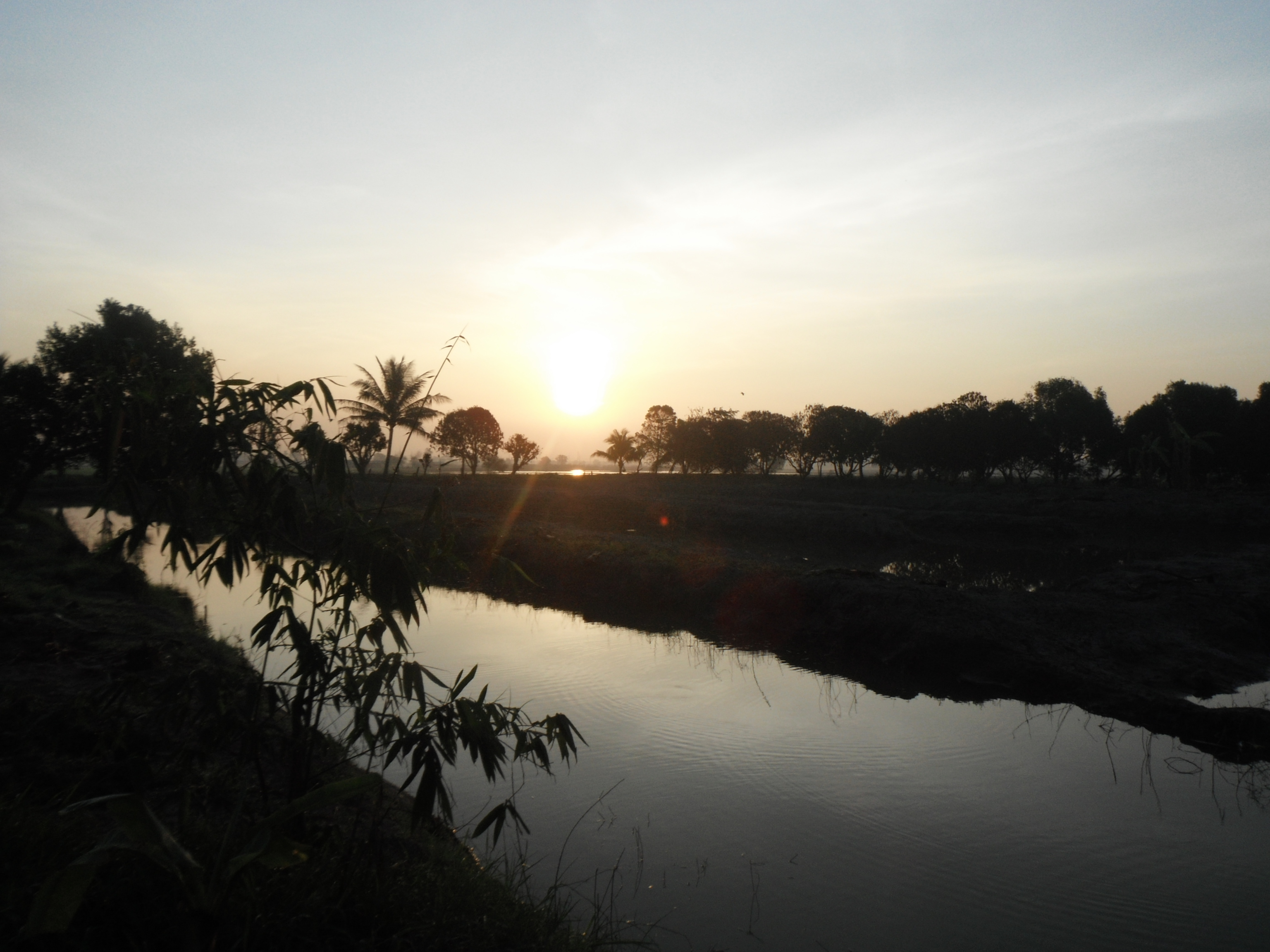
- Khlong in Chao Chet

- District location in Phra Nakhon Si Ayutthaya province
- Coordinates: 14°19′38″N 100°24′16″E
- Country: Thailand
- Province: Phra Nakhon Si Ayutthaya
- Seat: Sena
- Tambon: 17
- Muban: 132

Area
  - Total: 205.6 km^{2} (79.4 sq mi)

Population (2012)
  - Total: 66,670
  - Density: 313.4/km^{2} (812/sq mi)
- Time zone: UTC+7 (ICT)
- Postal code: 13110
- Geocode: 1412

Sena (Thai: เสนา, pronounced [sěːnāː]) is a district (amphoe) in Phra Nakhon Si Ayutthaya province, central Thailand. Local people typically know the populated centre of Sena as Ban Phaen (บ้านแพน).

== Geography ==
Neighboring districts are (from the north clockwise) Phak Hai, Bang Ban, Bang Sai (บางไทร), Lat Bua Luang and Bang Sai (บางซ้าย) of Ayutthaya Province.

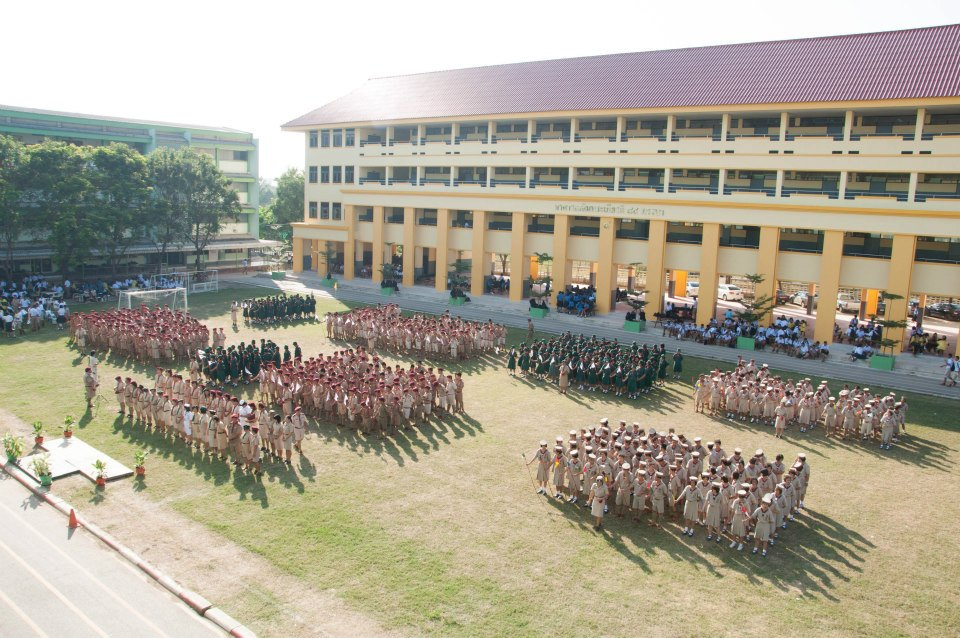
Senaprasit students, Sena

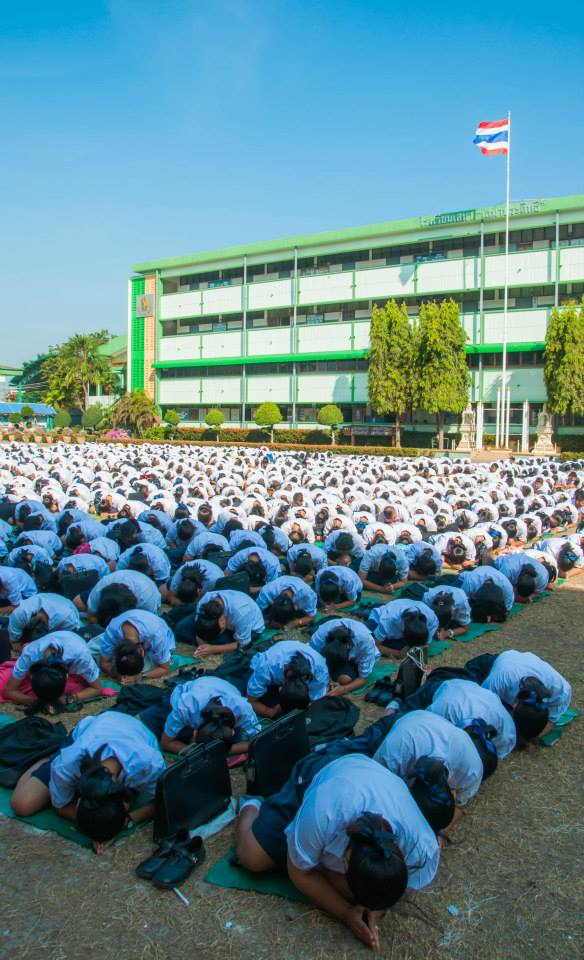
Senaprasit students, Sena

== Administration ==
The district is divided into 17 sub-districts (tambon), which are further subdivided into 132 administrative villages (muban). Sena is a town covering the whole Sena sub-district. There are four sub-district municipalities (thesaban tambon) − Sam Ko and Bang Nom Kho cover the whole same-named sub-district, Hua Wiang the whole sub-district Hua Wiang and Ban Krathum, and Chao Chet the whole sub-district Chao Sadet and parts of the sub-district Chao Chet and Ban Thaeo. There are a further nine tambon administrative organizations as the local government for the sub-districts not part of a municipality.

| No. | Name | Thai | Pop. |
|---|---|---|---|
| 1. | Sena | เสนา | 4,103 |
| 2. | Ban Phaen | บ้านแพน | 3,370 |
| 3. | Chao Chet | เจ้าเจ็ด | 4,729 |
| 4. | Sam Ko | สามกอ | 7,003 |
| 5. | Bang Nom Kho | บางนมโค | 7,127 |
| 6. | Hua Wiang | หัวเวียง | 4,236 |
| 7. | Manwichai | มารวิชัย | 2,556 |
| 8. | Ban Pho | บ้านโพธิ์ | 3,456 |
| 9. | Rang Chorakhe | รางจรเข้ | 2,753 |
| 10. | Ban Krathum | บ้านกระทุ่ม | 2,122 |
| 11. | Ban Thaeo | บ้านแถว | 4,084 |
| 12. | Chai Na | ชายนา | 4,880 |
| 13. | Sam Tum | สามตุ่ม | 4,692 |
| 14. | Lat Nga | ลาดงา | 3,437 |
| 15. | Don Thong | ดอนทอง | 2,444 |
| 16. | Ban Luang | บ้านหลวง | 2,844 |
| 17. | Chao Sadet | เจ้าเสด็จ | 2,834 |
