= Mueang Suphan Buri district =

Mueang Suphan Buri เมืองสุพรรณบุรี
- District
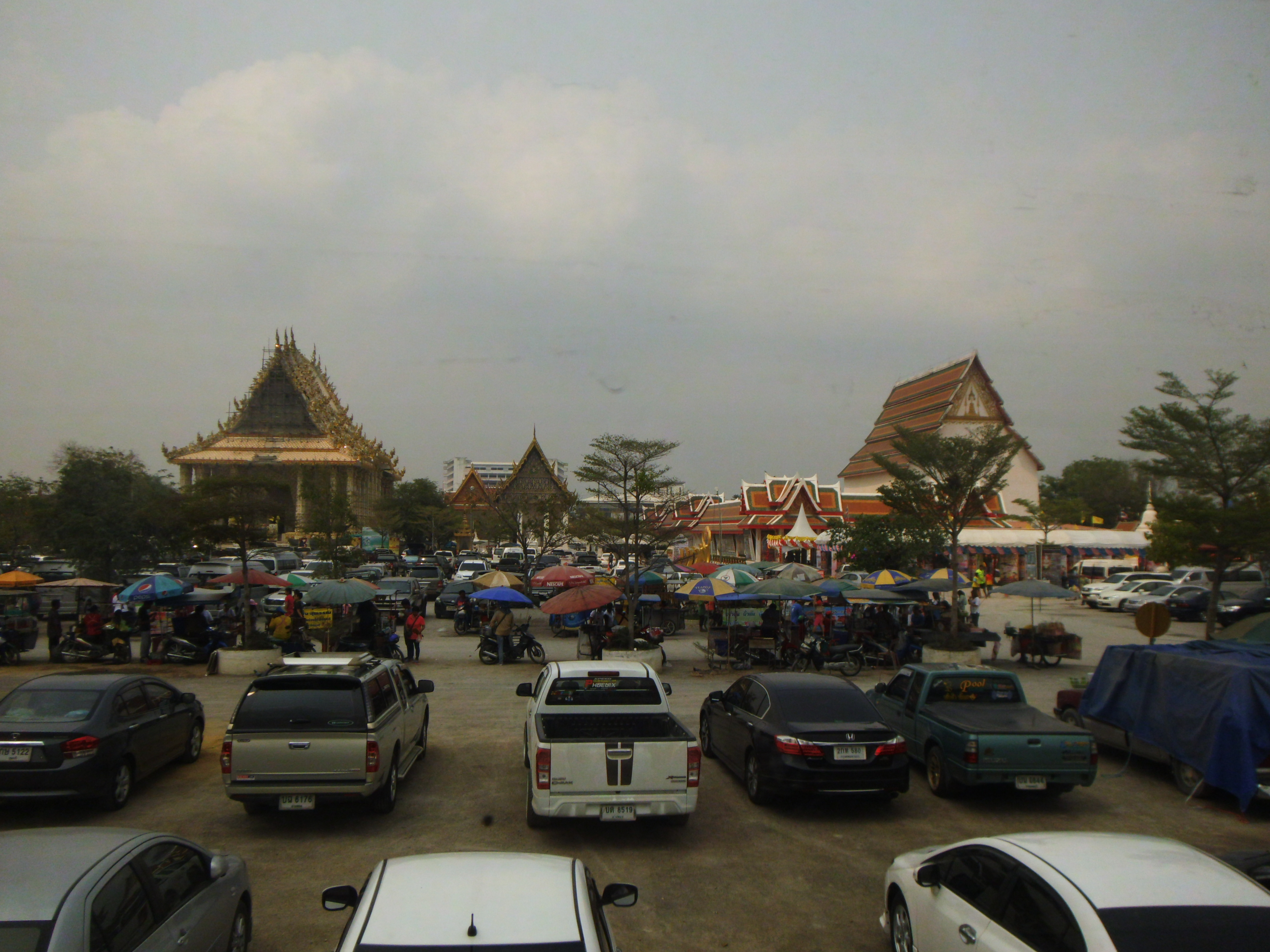
- Wat Pa Lelai Worawihan, Rua Yai, Mueang Suphan Buri District

- District location in Suphan Buri province
- Coordinates: 14°29′4″N 100°7′25″E
- Country: Thailand
- Province: Suphan Buri

Area
  - Total: 540.9 km^{2} (208.8 sq mi)

Population (2013)
  - Total: 166,716
  - Density: 292.3/km^{2} (757/sq mi)
- Time zone: UTC+7 (ICT)
- Postal code: 72000
- Geocode: 7201

Mueang Suphan Buri (Thai: เมืองสุพรรณบุรี, pronounced [mɯ̄a̯ŋ sù.pʰān bū.rīː]) is the capital district (amphoe mueang) of Suphan Buri province, central Thailand.

== History ==
Suphan Buri is an old city. In the era of Ankorian king Jayavarman VII, inscription called Prasat Phra Khan (จารึกปราสาทพระขรรค์) was made and which mentions the name of Suvarnapura. Later Suphan Buri become important city of Ayutthaya kingdom. According to Chinese Annals called "Da Ming Shi Lu" (『大明實錄』), Nakharinthathirat (Intharatcha or Nakhon In), before ascending the throne of Ayutthaya, was a ruler of Suphan Buri and tribute to Chinese Emperor as a King of Supan Buri (Su Men Bang Wang or 蘇門邦王). Later in the 16th century, Suphan Buri become battle field of King Naresuan and Burmese crown prince.

This area was the center of Mueang Suphan Buri. When the government created a district, it was called Wihan Daeng. Later the district name was changed to be Tha Phi Liang. In 1939 the district name was changed to Mueang Suphan Buri to correspond with the province name.

== Geography ==
Neighbouring districts are (from the south clockwise): Bang Pla Ma, U Thong, Don Chedi, Si Prachan of Suphan Buri Province; Wiset Chai Chan of Ang Thong province; and Phak Hai of Ayutthaya province.

The main water resource of the district is the Tha Chin river or Suphan river.

== Administration ==
=== Central administration ===
Mueang Suphan Buri is divided into 20 subdistricts (tambons), which are further subdivided into 124 administrative villages (mubans). The provincial administration has its headquarters in Tambon Sanam Chai.

No.	Name	Thai	Villages	Pop.
1.	Tha Phi Liang	ท่าพี่เลี้ยง	-	17,830
2.	Rua Yai	รั้วใหญ่	6	17,159
3.	Thap Ti Lek	ทับตีเหล็ก	5	3,953
4.	Tha Rahat	ท่าระหัด	5	10,349
5.	Phai Khwang	ไผ่ขวาง	6	7,728
6.	Khok Kho Thao	โคกโคเฒ่า	4	3,808
7.	Don Tan	ดอนตาล	5	3,338
8.	Don Masang	ดอนมะสังข์	5	3,340
9.	Phihan Daeng	พิหารแดง	6	5,105
10.	Don Kamyan	ดอนกำยาน	9	10,006
11.	Don Pho Thong	ดอนโพธิ์ทอง	6	6,669
12.	Ban Pho	บ้านโพธิ์	9	8,444
13.	Sa Kaeo	สระแก้ว	9	14,196
14.	Taling Chan	ตลิ่งชัน	7	9,071
15.	Bang Kung	บางกุ้ง	4	1,955
16.	Sala Khao	ศาลาขาว	10	8,584
17.	Suan Taeng	สวนแตง	9	10,115
18.	Sanam Chai	สนามชัย	6	10,629
19.	Pho Phraya	โพธิ์พระยา	7	6,775
20.	Sanam Khli	สนามคลี	6	7,662

=== Local administration ===
There is one town (thesaban mueang) in the district:

- Suphan Buri (Thai: เทศบาลเมืองสุพรรณบุรี) consisting of subdistrict Tha Phi Liang and parts of subdistricts Rua Yai and Tha Rahat.

There are seven subdistrict municipalities (thesaban tambons) in the district:

- Ban Pho (Thai: เทศบาลตำบลบ้านโพธิ์) consisting of subdistrict Ban Pho.
- Huai Wang Thong (Thai: เทศบาลตำบลห้วยวังทอง) consisting of parts of subdistrict Pho Phraya.
- Tha Sadet (Thai: เทศบาลตำบลท่าเสด็จ) consisting of subdistrict Sa Kaeo.
- Pho Phraya (Thai: เทศบาลตำบลโพธิ์พระยา) consisting of parts of subdistrict Pho Phraya.
- Suan Taeng (Thai: เทศบาลตำบลสวนแตง) consisting of parts of subdistricts Sala Khao, Suan Taeng.
- Tha Rahat (Thai: เทศบาลตำบลท่าระหัด) consisting of parts of subdistrict Tha Rahat.
- Bang Kung (Thai: เทศบาลตำบลบางกุ้ง) consisting of subdistrict Bang Kung.

There are 14 subdistrict administrative organizations (SAO) in the district:

- Rua Yai (Thai: องค์การบริหารส่วนตำบลรั้วใหญ่) consisting of parts of subdistrict Rua Yai.
- Thap Ti Lek (Thai: องค์การบริหารส่วนตำบลทับตีเหล็ก) consisting of subdistrict Thap Ti Lek.
- Phai Khwang (Thai: องค์การบริหารส่วนตำบลไผ่ขวาง) consisting of subdistrict Phai Khwang.
- Khok Kho Thao (Thai: องค์การบริหารส่วนตำบลโคกโคเฒ่า) consisting of subdistrict Khok Kho Thao.
- Don Tan (Thai: องค์การบริหารส่วนตำบลดอนตาล) consisting of subdistrict Don Tan.
- Don Masang (Thai: องค์การบริหารส่วนตำบลดอนมะสังข์) consisting of subdistrict Don Masang.
- Phihan Daeng (Thai: องค์การบริหารส่วนตำบลพิหารแดง) consisting of subdistrict Phihan Daeng.
- Don Kamyan (Thai: องค์การบริหารส่วนตำบลดอนกำยาน) consisting of subdistrict Don Kamyan.
- Don Pho Thong (Thai: องค์การบริหารส่วนตำบลดอนโพธิ์ทอง) consisting of subdistrict Don Pho Thong.
- Taling Chan (Thai: องค์การบริหารส่วนตำบลตลิ่งชัน) consisting of subdistrict Taling Chan.
- Sala Khao (Thai: องค์การบริหารส่วนตำบลศาลาขาว) consisting of parts of subdistrict Sala Khao.
- Suan Taeng (Thai: องค์การบริหารส่วนตำบลสวนแตง) consisting of parts of subdistrict Suan Taeng.
- Sanam Chai (Thai: องค์การบริหารส่วนตำบลสนามชัย) consisting of subdistrict Sanam Chai.
- Sanam Khli (Thai: องค์การบริหารส่วนตำบลสนามคลี) consisting of subdistrict Sanam Khli.
