= Lat Lum Kaeo district =

Lat Lum Kaeo ลาดหลุมแก้ว
- District
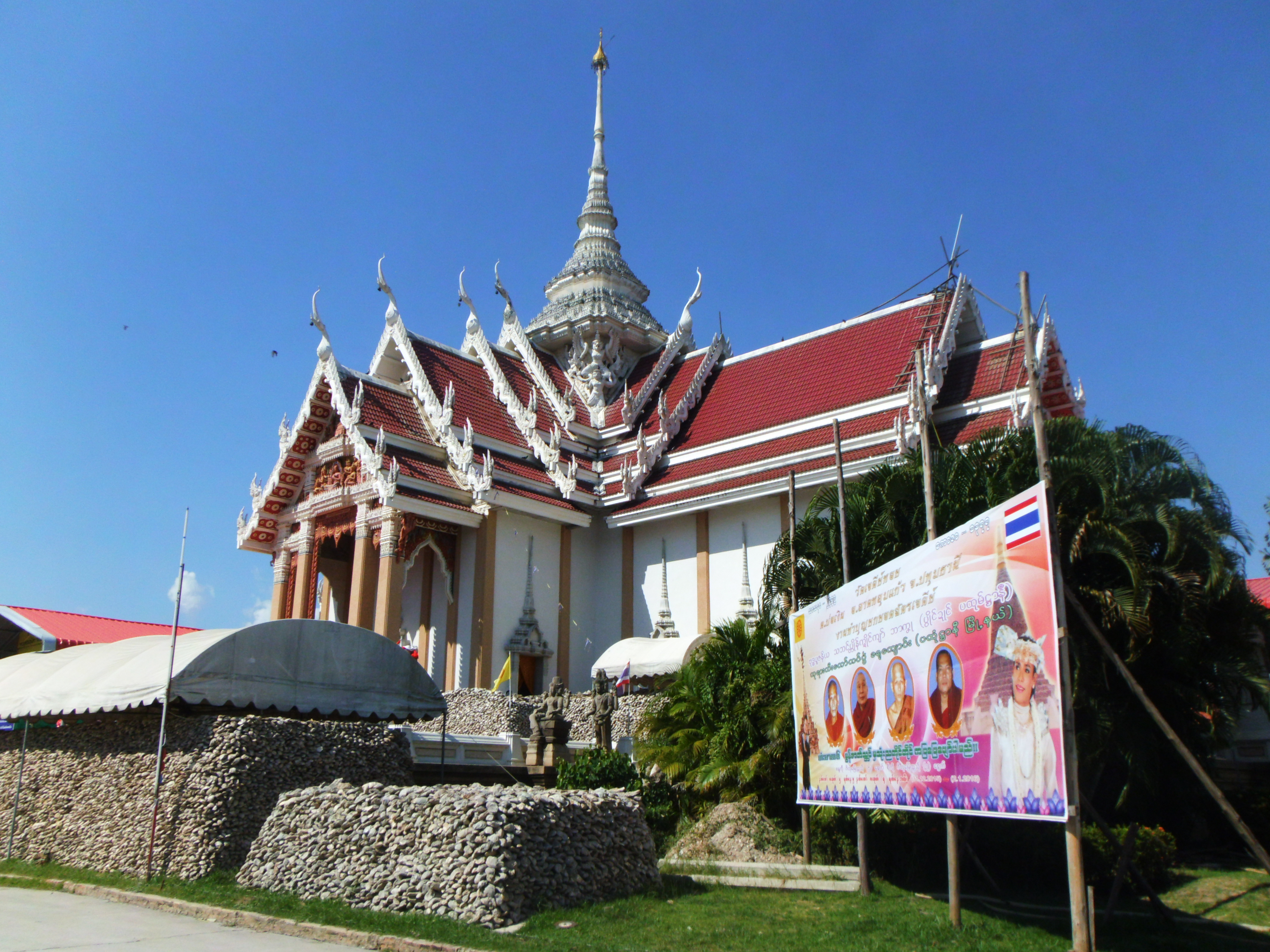
- Wat Chedi Hoi

- District location in Pathum Thani province
- Coordinates: 14°2′14″N 100°24′17″E
- Country: Thailand
- Province: Pathum Thani
- Seat: Rahaeng
- District established: 28 March 1916

Area
  - Total: 183.12 km^{2} (70.70 sq mi)

Population (2017)
  - Total: 65,563
  - Density: 358.03/km^{2} (927.3/sq mi)
- Time zone: UTC+7 (ICT)
- Postal code: 12140
- Geocode: 1305

Lat Lum Kaeo (Thai: ลาดหลุมแก้ว, pronounced [lâːt lǔm kɛ̂ːw]) is the westernmost district of Pathum Thani province, central Thailand.

== History ==
The district was established on 28 March 1916.

== Geography ==
Neighboring districts are (from the north clockwise): Lat Bua Luang of Phra Nakhon Si Ayutthaya province; Sam Khok and Mueang Pathum Thani of Pathum Thani province; and Pak Kret, Bang Bua Thong, and Sai Noi of Nonthaburi province.

== Administration ==
The district is divided into seven sub-districts (tambons), which are further subdivided into 67 villages (mubans). Rahaeng is a sub-district municipality (thesaban tambon) and covers part of tambon Rahaeng. Each of the tambons has a Tambon administrative organization (TAO).

No.	Name	Thai	Villages	Pop.
1.	Rahaeng	ระแหง	12	13,693
2.	Lat Lum Kaeo	ลาดหลุมแก้ว	7	4,439
3.	Khu Bang Luang	คูบางหลวง	12	7,934
4.	Khu Khwang	คูขวาง	5	5,361
5.	Khlong Phra Udom	คลองพระอุดม	13	5,464
6.	Bo Ngoen	บ่อเงิน	7	4,320
7.	Na Mai	หน้าไม้	11	11,784
