= Bang Sai district (1404) =

Bang Sai บางไทร
- District
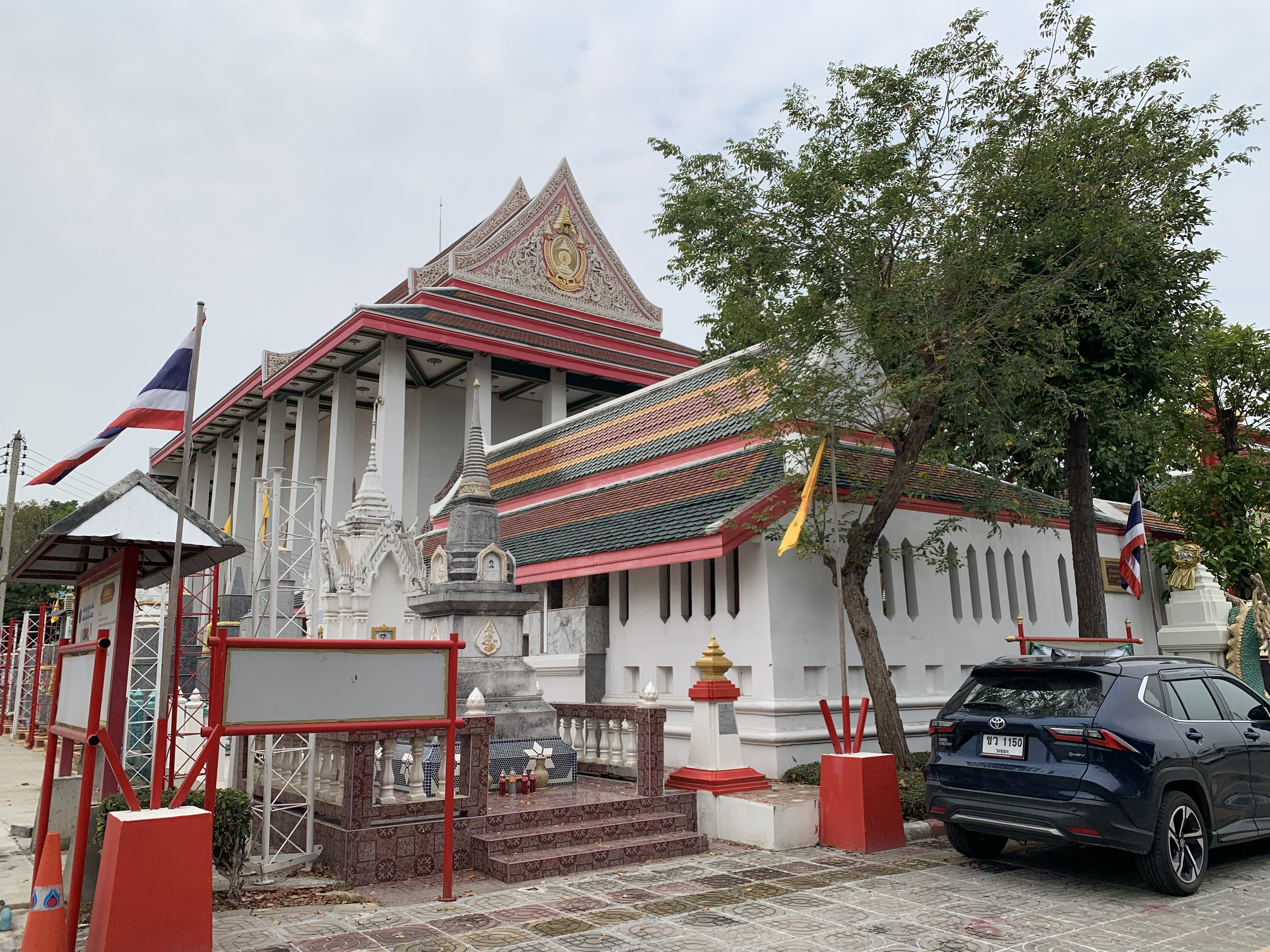
- Wat Choeng Len (Bang Sai)

- District location in Phra Nakhon Si Ayutthaya province
- Coordinates: 14°12′46″N 100°29′54″E
- Country: Thailand
- Province: Ayutthaya
- Tambon: 23
- Seat: Bang Sai

Area
  - Total: 150.7 km^{2} (58.2 sq mi)

Population (2000)
  - Total: 19,973
  - Density: 132.5/km^{2} (343.3/sq mi)
- Time zone: UTC+7 (ICT)
- Postal code: 13270
- Geocode: 1404

Bang Sai (Thai: บางไทร, pronounced [bāːŋ sāj]) is a district (amphoe) in the southern part of Phra Nakhon Si Ayutthaya province, central Thailand. There is another district of Ayutthaya which shares the same romanization Bang Sai, but has a different spelling in Thai.

== History ==
The district dates back to khwaeng Sena Noi, which became an amphoe in 1898. It was renamed Ratchakhram in 1923 as the name of central tambon. In 1925 the district office was relocated to tambon Bang Sai, which became the name of the district in 1939.

== Geography ==
Neighboring districts are (from the north clockwise) Bang Ban, Phra Nakhon Si Ayutthaya, Bang Pa-in of Ayutthaya Province, Sam Khok of Pathum Thani province, and Lat Bua Luang and Sena of Ayutthaya again.

The main water sources are Chao Phraya and Noi Rivers. The topography of Bang Sai is a lowland area, so it experiences flooding almost every year.

== Administration ==
The district is divided into 23 sub-districts (tambons).

| No. | Name | Thai name |
|---|---|---|
| 1. | Bang Sai | บางไทร |
| 2. | Bang Phli | บางพลี |
| 3. | Sanam Chai | สนามชัย |
| 4. | Ban Paeng | บ้านแป้ง |
| 5. | Na Mai | หน้าไม้ |
| 6. | Bang Yi Tho | บางยี่โท |
| 7. | Khae Ok | แคออก |
| 8. | Khae Tok | แคตก |
| 9. | Chang Lek | ช่างเหล็ก |
| 10. | Krachaeng | กระแชง |
| 11. | Ban Klueng | บ้านกลึง |
| 12. | Chang Noi | ช้างน้อย |
| 13. | Homok | ห่อหมก |
| 14. | Phai Phra | ไผ่พระ |
| 15. | Kok Kaeo Burapha | กกแก้วบูรพา |
| 16. | Mai Tra | ไม้ตรา |
| 17. | Ban Ma | บ้านม้า |
| 18. | Ban Ko | บ้านเกาะ |
| 19. | Ratchakhram | ราชคราม |
| 20. | Chang Yai | ช้างใหญ่ |
| 21. | Pho Taeng | โพแตง |
| 22. | Chiang Rak Noi | เชียงรากน้อย |
| 23. | Khok Chang | โคกช้าง |

== Population ==
Bang Sai has a population of about 50,000 people, most of whom are engaged in agriculture, and few of them work in the local industrial factories.
