= Bang Pla Ma district =

Bang Pla Ma บางปลาม้า
- Amphoe
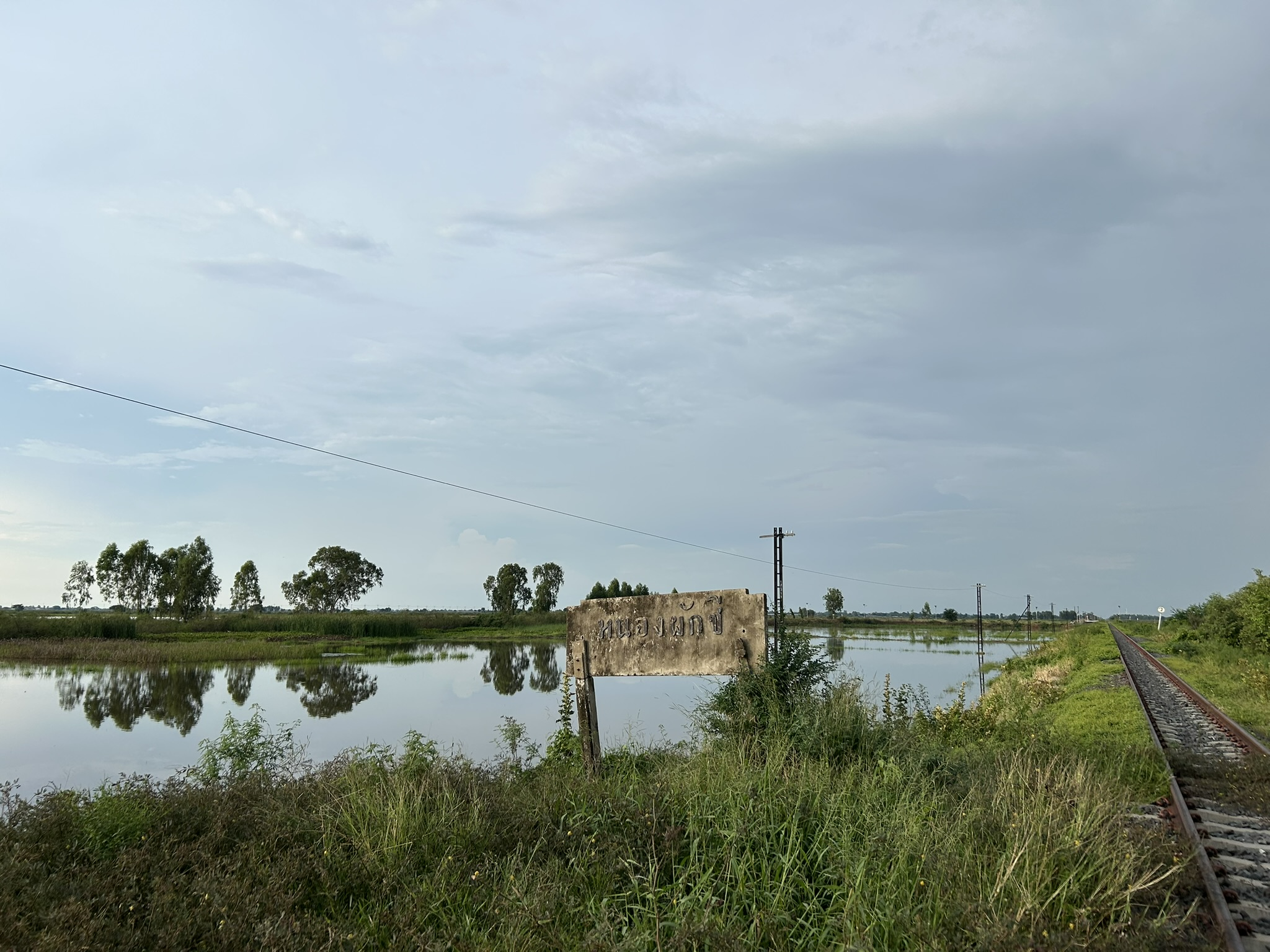
- Nong Phak Chi halt sign, former railway station of the Suphan Buri Line, Bang Pla Ma

- Amphoe location in Suphan Buri province
- Coordinates: 14°24′8″N 100°9′16″E
- Country: Thailand
- Province: Suphan Buri

Area
  - Total: 481.3 km^{2} (185.8 sq mi)

Population (2021)
  - Total: 75,873
  - Density: 180.7/km^{2} (468/sq mi)
- Time zone: UTC+7 (THA)
- Postal code: 72150
- Geocode: 7204

Bang Pla Ma (Thai: บางปลาม้า, pronounced [bāːŋ plāː máː]) is a district (amphoe) in the southern part of Suphan Buri province, central Thailand.

== History ==
The district was established in 1897 by the governor Phra Samutkhananurak (พระสมุทรคณานุรักษ์).

The name Pla Ma is the Thai name of the fish species Boesemania microlepis, which is found a lot in the area of the district. This type of fish is a famous food that has created a reputation for the province for a long time and is also the provincial aquatic animal.

== Geography ==
Neighboring districts are (from the east clockwise) Phak Hai and Bang Sai of Ayutthaya province, Song Phi Nong, U Thong and Mueang Suphan Buri of Suphan Buri Province.

The main water resource of the district is the Tha Chin river or Suphan river.

== Administration ==
=== Central administration ===
The district Bang Pla Ma is subdivided into 14 subdistrict (tambon), which are further subdivided into 127 administrative villages (muban).

No.	Name	Thai	Villages	Pop.
1.	Khok Khram	โคกคราม	12	7,303
2.	Bang Pla Ma	บางปลาม้า	12	9,000
3.	Takha	ตะค่า	9	5,727
4.	Bang Yai	บางใหญ่	8	4,549
5.	Kritsana	กฤษณา	7	3,952
6.	Sali	สาลี	8	7,152
7.	Phai Kong Din	ไผ่กองดิน	8	6,754
8.	Ongkharak	องครักษ์	7	5,378
9.	Chorakhe Yai	จรเข้ใหญ่	9	4,815
10.	Ban Laem	บ้านแหลม	5	4,473
11.	Makham Lom	มะขามล้ม	14	5,004
12.	Wang Nam Yen	วังน้ำเย็น	7	4,109
13.	Wat Bot	วัดโบสถ์	11	4,909
14.	Wat Dao	วัดดาว	10	6,161

=== Local administration ===
There are 7 subdistrict municipalities (thesaban tambon) in the district:

- Ban Laem Phatthana (Thai: เทศบาลตำบลบ้านแหลมพัฒนา) consisting of parts of the subdistrict Ban Laem.
- Khok Khram (Thai: เทศบาลตำบลโคกคราม) consisting of parts of the subdistrict Khok Khram.
- Bang Pla Ma (Thai: เทศบาลตำบลบางปลาม้า) consisting of parts of the subdistrict Bang Pla Ma.
- Ban Laem (Thai: เทศบาลตำบลบ้านแหลม) consisting of parts of the subdistrict Ban Laem.
- Phai Kong Din (Thai: เทศบาลตำบลไผ่กองดิน) consisting of parts of the subdistrict Phai Kong Din.
- Ton Kram (Thai: เทศบาลตำบลต้นคราม) consisting of parts of the subdistrict Khok Khram.
- Takha (Thai: เทศบาลตำบลตะค่า) consisting of the complete subdistrict Takha.

There are 11 subdistrict administrative organizations (SAO) in the district:

- Bang Pla Ma (Thai: องค์การบริหารส่วนตำบลบางปลาม้า) consisting of parts of the subdistrict Bang Pla Ma.
- Bang Yai (Thai: องค์การบริหารส่วนตำบลบางใหญ่) consisting of the complete subdistrict Bang Yai.
- Kritsana (Thai: องค์การบริหารส่วนตำบลกฤษณา) consisting of the complete subdistrict Kritsana.
- Sali (Thai: องค์การบริหารส่วนตำบลสาลี) consisting of the complete subdistrict Sali.
- Phai Kong Din (Thai: องค์การบริหารส่วนตำบลไผ่กองดิน) consisting of parts of the subdistrict Phai Kong Din.
- Ongkharak (Thai: องค์การบริหารส่วนตำบลองครักษ์) consisting of the complete subdistrict Ongkharak.
- Chorakhe Yai (Thai: องค์การบริหารส่วนตำบลจรเข้ใหญ่) consisting of the complete subdistrict Chorakhe Yai.
- Makham Lom (Thai: องค์การบริหารส่วนตำบลมะขามล้ม) consisting of the complete subdistrict Makham Lom.
- Wang Nam Yen (Thai: องค์การบริหารส่วนตำบลวังน้ำเย็น) consisting of the complete subdistrict Wang Nam Yen.
- Wat Bot (Thai: องค์การบริหารส่วนตำบลวัดโบสถ์) consisting of the complete subdistrict Wat Bot.
- Wat Dao (Thai: องค์การบริหารส่วนตำบลวัดดาว) consisting of the complete subdistrict Wat Dao.

== Population ==
In 2021, the district had a total population of 75,873 people. Additionally, Bang Pla Ma has local ethnic, Lao Phuan, migrated from Xiangkhouang province, Laos. They have been settled here for more than hundred years, especially in Wat Bot subdistrict. They have their own identity and still strongly conserve their traditions and cultures, such as related to rice paddy's tradition.

== Kao Hong market ==
Kao Hong market is an old market and community feels like a time machine with an atmosphere of at least one hundred years old, similar to Sam Chuk market of Sam Chuk district. Kao Hong market is a two-storey old wooden market by the Tha Chin river where people in the community continue to live their traditional ways of life as simple as in the past. Its name meaning "nine-room house" or "nine-shophouses" which is an ancient Thai wooden house with a long history opposite the market. Its founded by Chinese merchant named Hong or Boonrod Liangwanich in 1934, who survived the robbery at his bustling raft shop-cum-house but his wife was killed. He therefore founded the bandit watch tower in the middle of the market, considered as the only tower for the bandits of the province and the country. It is as tall as a six-story building (including the deck) and is considered a highlight and a landmark of this market. This market is divided into three zones according to its direction, namely Talat Lang (lower market), Talat Klang (middle market), and Talat Bon (upper market). In the past, it used to be a waterfront Thai Chinese community similar to floating market since King Rama V's reign. There was a pier with water buses running from here along the river until reaching Bangkok. Nowadays there are only few household of local food and traditional Chinese sweet shops. With its old and classic, therefore making it a location for filming many movies and TV dramas. This market is open every day but will be lively on Saturdays and Sundays with public holidays only.
