= Waeng Noi district =

Waeng Noi แวงน้อย
- District
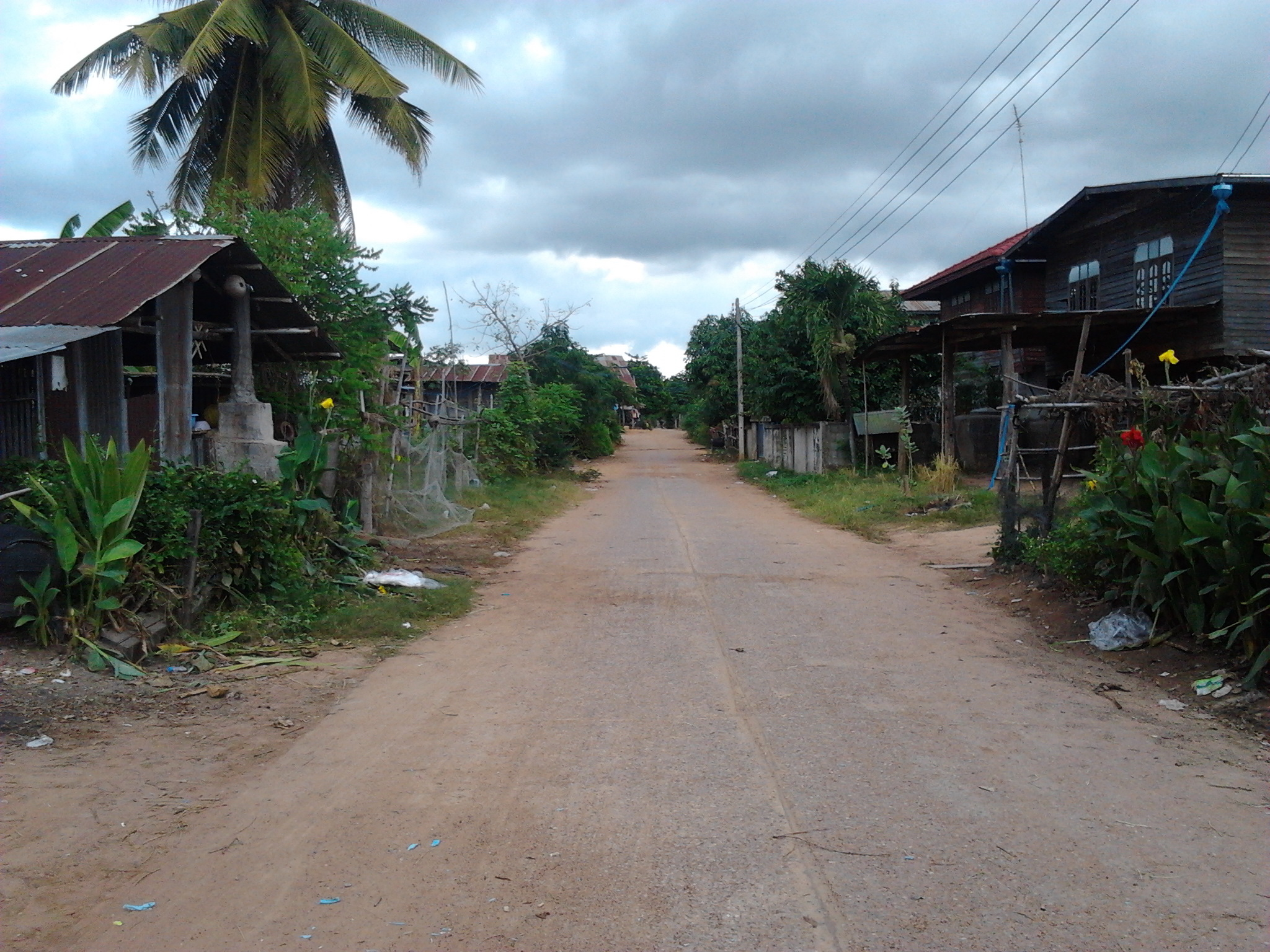
- Lahan Na village

- District location in Khon Kaen province
- Coordinates: 15°48′13″N 102°24′57″E
- Country: Thailand
- Province: Khon Kaen
- Seat: Waeng Noi

Area
  - Total: 283.6 km^{2} (109.5 sq mi)

Population (2005)
  - Total: 42,408
  - Density: 149.5/km^{2} (387/sq mi)
- Time zone: UTC+7 (ICT)
- Postal code: 40230
- Geocode: 4014

Waeng Noi (Thai: แวงน้อย, pronounced [wɛ̄ːŋ nɔ́ːj]; Northeastern Thai: แวงน้อย, pronounced [wɛ̂ːŋ nɔ̏ːj]) is a district (amphoe) in the southwestern part of Khon Kaen province, northeastern Thailand.

== Geography ==
Neighboring districts are (from the north clockwise): Waeng Yai and Phon of Khon Kaen Province; Bua Lai, Bua Yai, and Kaeng Sanam Nang of Nakhon Ratchasima province; and Khon Sawan of Chaiyaphum province.

== History ==
The minor district (king amphoe) was created on 1 June 1971, when six tambons were split off from Phon district. It was upgraded to a full district on 21 August 1975.

== Administration ==
The district is divided into six subdistricts (tambons), which are further subdivided into 73 villages (mubans). Waeng Noi is a township (thesaban tambon) which covers parts of tambon Waeng Noi. There are a further six tambon administrative organizations (TAO).

No.	Name	Thai name	Villages	Pop.
1.	Waeng Noi	แวงน้อย	13	9,826
2.	Kan Lueang	ก้านเหลือง	14	9,343
3.	Tha Nang Naeo	ท่านางแนว	10	4,884
4.	Lahan Na	ละหานนา	15	7,589
5.	Tha Wat	ท่าวัด	10	5,712
6.	Thang Khwang	ทางขวาง	11	5,054
