= Bua Lai district =

Bua Lai บัวลาย
- District
- District location in Nakhon Ratchasima province
- Coordinates: 15°39′46″N 102°31′38″E
- Country: Thailand
- Province: Nakhon Ratchasima
- Seat: Mueang Phalai

Area
  - Total: 133.1 km^{2} (51.4 sq mi)

Population (2000)
  - Total: 25,061
  - Density: 188.3/km^{2} (488/sq mi)
- Time zone: UTC+7 (ICT)
- Postal code: 30120
- Geocode: 3030

Bua Lai (Thai: บัวลาย, pronounced [būa lāːj], Northeastern Thai: บัวลาย; pronounced [bùa lâːj]) is a district (amphoe) in the northeastern part of Nakhon Ratchasima province, northeastern Thailand.

== History ==
The area of Bua Lai was separated from Bua Yai district and made a minor district (king amphoe) on 1 July 1997. Most of the people of Bua Lai originally migrated there from Maha Sarakham and Roi Et provinces.

On 15 May 2007, all of Thailand's 81 minor districts were upgraded to full districts. With publication in the Royal Gazette on 24 August the upgrade became official.

== Geography ==
Neighboring districts are (from the north clockwise): Waeng Noi and Phon of Khon Kaen province and Prathai, Sida, and Bua Yai.

== Administration ==
The district is divided into four subdistricts (tambons). The township (thesaban tambon) Nong Bua Lai covers parts of tambon Bua Lai.

1.	Mueang Phalai	เมืองพะไล
2.	Non Chan	โนนจาน
3.	Bua Lai	บัวลาย
4.	Nong Wa	หนองหว้า
