= Kaeng Sanam Nang district =

Kaeng Sanam Nang แก้งสนามนาง
- District
- District location in Nakhon Ratchasima province
- Coordinates: 15°45′0″N 102°15′17″E
- Country: Thailand
- Province: Nakhon Ratchasima
- Seat: Kaeng Sanam Nang

Area
  - Total: 107.3 km^{2} (41.4 sq mi)

Population (2000)
  - Total: 37,884
  - Density: 353.2/km^{2} (915/sq mi)
- Time zone: UTC+7 (ICT)
- Postal code: 30440
- Geocode: 3023

Kaeng Sanam Nang (Thai: แก้งสนามนาง, pronounced [kɛ̂(ː)ŋ sā.nǎːm nāːŋ]; Northeastern Thai: แก้งสนามนาง, pronounced [kɛ̂(ː)ŋ sā.nǎːm nâːŋ]) is the northernmost district (amphoe) of Nakhon Ratchasima province, northeastern Thailand.

== History ==
On 7 January 1986 the four tambons Kaeng Sanam Nang, Non Samran, Bueng Phalai, and Si Suk were split off from Bua Yai district and created the minor district (king amphoe) Kaeng Sanam Nang. The government officially upgraded it to a full district on 20 October 1993.

== Geography ==
Neighbouring districts are (from the north clockwise): Mueang Chaiyaphum and Khon Sawan of Chaiyaphum province; Waeng Noi of Khon Kaen province; Bua Yai and Ban Lueam of Nakhon Ratchasima Province.

== Administration ==
The district is divided into five subdistricts (tambon). There are no municipal (thesaban) areas in the district.

1.	Kaeng Sanam Nang	แก้งสนามนาง
2.	Non Samran	โนนสำราญ
3.	Bueng Phalai	บึงพะไล
4.	Si Suk	สีสุก
5.	Bueng Samrong	บึงสำโรง
