= Prathai district =

Prathai ประทาย
- District
- District location in Nakhon Ratchasima province
- Coordinates: 15°32′0″N 102°43′22″E
- Country: Thailand
- Province: Nakhon Ratchasima
- District established: 1961

Area
  - Total: 600.6 km^{2} (231.9 sq mi)

Population (2015)
  - Total: 77,927
  - Density: 127.7/km^{2} (331/sq mi)
- Time zone: UTC+7 (ICT)
- Postal code: 30180
- Geocode: 3013

Prathai (Thai: ประทาย, pronounced [prā.tʰāːj]; Northeastern Thai: ผะทาย, pronounced [pʰā.tʰa᷇ːj]) is a district (amphoe) in the northeastern part of Nakhon Ratchasima province, northeastern Thailand.

== History ==
Prathai village was settled in the Khmer era. King Jayavarman II set his camp in the area when he expanded his power to the west. After his reign, Prathai was deserted. It became a community again in the Sukhothai era.

Prathai in Khmer means 'camp'.

Tambon Prathai was separated from Bua Yai district to create a minor district (king amphoe) on 1 January 1961 and upgraded to a full district in 1963.

== Geography ==
Neighboring districts are (from the north clockwise): Phon and Nong Song Hong of Khon Kaen province; Ban Mai Chaiyaphot of Buriram province; and Mueang Yang, Chum Phuang, Phimai, Non Daeng, Sida, and Bua Lai of Nakhon Ratchasima Province.

== Administration ==
=== Central administration ===
Prathai is divided into 13 sub-districts (tambons), which are further subdivided into 151 administrative villages (mubans).

No.	Name	Thai	Villages	Pop.
1.	Prathai	ประทาย	17	10,191
3.	Krathum Rai	กระทุ่มราย	17	7,285
4.	Wang Mai Daeng	วังไม้แดง	11	6,310
6.	Talat Sai	ตลาดไทร	13	6,024
7.	Nong Phluang	หนองพลวง	12	5,695
8.	Nong Khai	หนองค่าย	14	5,083
9.	Han Huai Sai	หันห้วยทราย	9	5,576
10.	Don Man	ดอนมัน	10	5,393
13.	Nang Ram	นางรำ	13	5,829
14.	Non Phet	โนนเพ็ด	11	5,789
15.	Thung Sawang	ทุ่งสว่าง	8	4,669
17.	Khok Klang	โคกกลาง	9	6,030
18.	Mueang Don	เมืองโดน	7	4,053

Missing numbers are tambons which now form Non Daeng District.

=== Local administration ===
There is one sub-district municipality (thesaban tambon) in the district:

- Prathai (Thai: เทศบาลตำบลประทาย) consisting of parts of sub-district Prathai.

There are 13 sub-district administrative organizations (SAO) in the district:

- Prathai (Thai: องค์การบริหารส่วนตำบลประทาย) consisting of parts of sub-district Prathai.
- Krathum Rai (Thai: องค์การบริหารส่วนตำบลกระทุ่มราย) consisting of sub-district Krathum Rai.
- Wang Mai Daeng (Thai: องค์การบริหารส่วนตำบลวังไม้แดง) consisting of sub-district Wang Mai Daeng.
- Talat Sai (Thai: องค์การบริหารส่วนตำบลตลาดไทร) consisting of sub-district Talat Sai.
- Nong Phluang (Thai: องค์การบริหารส่วนตำบลหนองพลวง) consisting of sub-district Nong Phluang.
- Nong Khai (Thai: องค์การบริหารส่วนตำบลหนองค่าย) consisting of sub-district Nong Khai.
- Han Huai Sai (Thai: องค์การบริหารส่วนตำบลหันห้วยทราย) consisting of sub-district Han Huai Sai.
- Don Man (Thai: องค์การบริหารส่วนตำบลดอนมัน) consisting of sub-district Don Man.
- Nang Ram (Thai: องค์การบริหารส่วนตำบลนางรำ) consisting of sub-district Nang Ram.
- Non Phet (Thai: องค์การบริหารส่วนตำบลโนนเพ็ด) consisting of sub-district Non Phet.
- Thung Sawang (Thai: องค์การบริหารส่วนตำบลทุ่งสว่าง) consisting of sub-district Thung Sawang.
- Khok Klang (Thai: องค์การบริหารส่วนตำบลโคกกลาง) consisting of sub-district Khok Klang.
- Mueang Don (Thai: องค์การบริหารส่วนตำบลเมืองโดน) consisting of sub-district Mueang Don.
