= Sida district =

Sida สีดา
- District
- District location in Nakhon Ratchasima province
- Coordinates: 15°32′33″N 102°33′57″E
- Country: Thailand
- Province: Nakhon Ratchasima
- Seat: Sida

Area
  - Total: 170.1 km^{2} (65.7 sq mi)

Population (2000)
  - Total: 24,540
  - Density: 144.3/km^{2} (374/sq mi)
- Time zone: UTC+7 (ICT)
- Postal code: 30430, 30120
- Geocode: 3031

Sida (Thai: สีดา, pronounced [sǐː.dāː]) is a district (amphoe) in the northeastern part of Nakhon Ratchasima province, northeastern Thailand.

== History ==
The area of Sida was separated from Bua Yai district and made a minor district on 1 July 1997. On 15 May 2007, all 81 minor districts were upgraded to full districts. On 24 August the upgrade became official.

== Geography ==
Neighbouring districts are (from the north clockwise): Bua Lai, Prathai, Non Daeng, and Bua Yai.

== Administration ==
The district is divided into five subdistricts (tambons), which are further subdivided into 50 villages (mubans). Sida is also the only township (thesaban tambon) and covers parts of tambons Sida, Phon Thong, and Sam Mueang.

1.	Sida	สีดา
2.	Phon Thong	โพนทอง
3.	Non Pradu	โนนประดู่
4.	Sam Mueang	สามเมือง
5.	Nong Tat Yai	หนองตาดใหญ่
