= Non Daeng district =

Non Daeng โนนแดง
- District
- District location in Nakhon Ratchasima province
- Coordinates: 15°24′39″N 102°32′25″E
- Country: Thailand
- Province: Nakhon Ratchasima
- Seat: Non Daeng

Area
  - Total: 193.4 km^{2} (74.7 sq mi)

Population (2010)
  - Total: 25,468
  - Density: 136.5/km^{2} (354/sq mi)
- Time zone: UTC+7 (ICT)
- Postal code: 30360
- Geocode: 3024

Non Daeng (Thai: โนนแดง, pronounced [nōːn dɛ̄ːŋ]) is a district (amphoe) in the northeastern part of Nakhon Ratchasima province, northeastern Thailand.

== Etymology ==
The name of the district comes from Daeng trees (ต้นแดง, Xylia xylocarpa Taub.)

== History ==
Non Daeng village was upgraded to be Tambon Non Daeng of Bua Yai district in 1965. Later it was made part of the district Prathai. It became a minor district (king amphoe) on 1 April 1989, when that tambon together with Non Ta Then, Sam Phaniang, and Wang Hin were split off from Prathai. The fifth tambon, Don Yao Yai, was added on 1 August 1989. The minor district was upgraded to a full district on 20 October 1993.

== Geography ==
Neighboring districts are (from the north clockwise): Sida, Prathai, Phimai, Khong, and Bua Yai.

== Administration ==
The district is divided into five sub-districts (tambons). Non Daeng is also the only township (thesaban tambon) of the district, covering parts of the tambon Non Daeng.

1.	Non Daeng	โนนแดง
2.	Non Ta Then	โนนตาเถร
3.	Sam Phaniang	สำพะเนียง
4.	Wang Hin	วังหิน
5.	Don Yao Yai	ดอนยาวใหญ่

== Economy ==
The district is predominantly agricultural. The Wang Hin Sub-district has been singled out for its innovative community development and efficient use of governmental funding. The sub-district's 13 villages and 4,500 people, who occupy 29,000 rai of land, enjoy greater prosperity than their neighbours. Villagers earn an average income of 47,000 baht per person per year, higher than the 38,000 baht per capita per year outlined as "Basic Minimum Needs" by the Thai Ministry of Interior. Wan Hin's success has been attributed in part to an energetic, well-educated mayor applying sufficiency economy practices to community development.
