= Nakhon Ratchasima province =

Nakhon Ratchasima นครราชสีมา
- Province
- Nakhon Ratchasima province
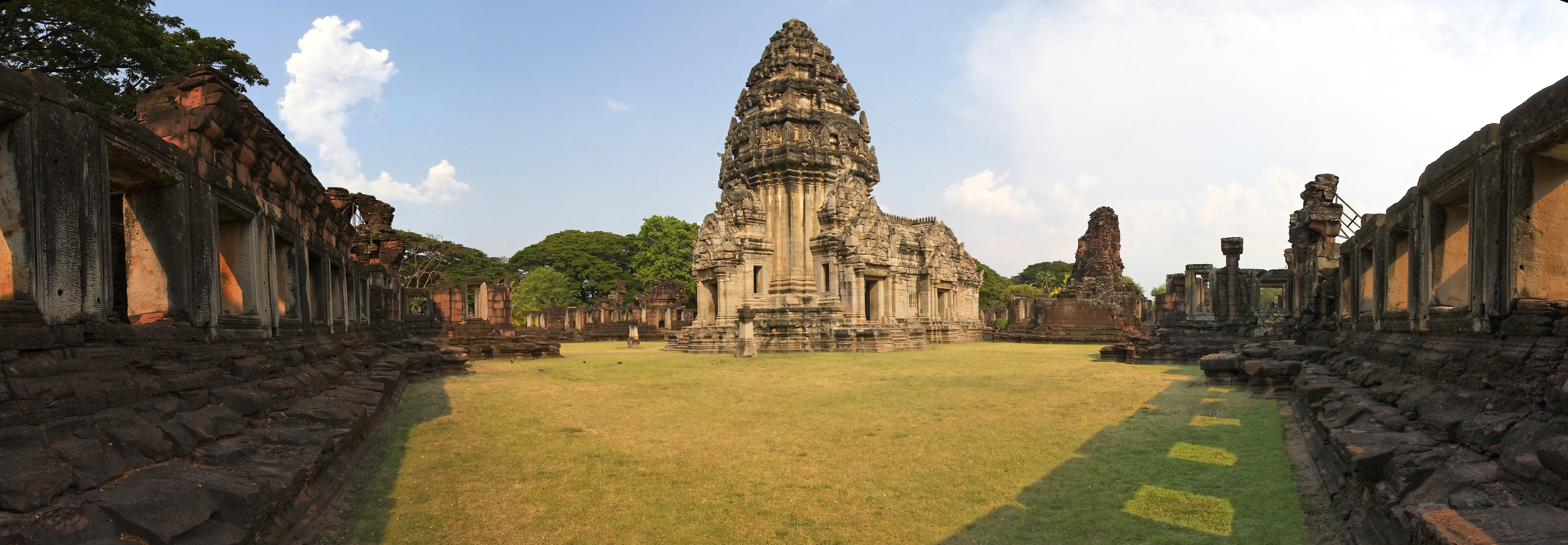
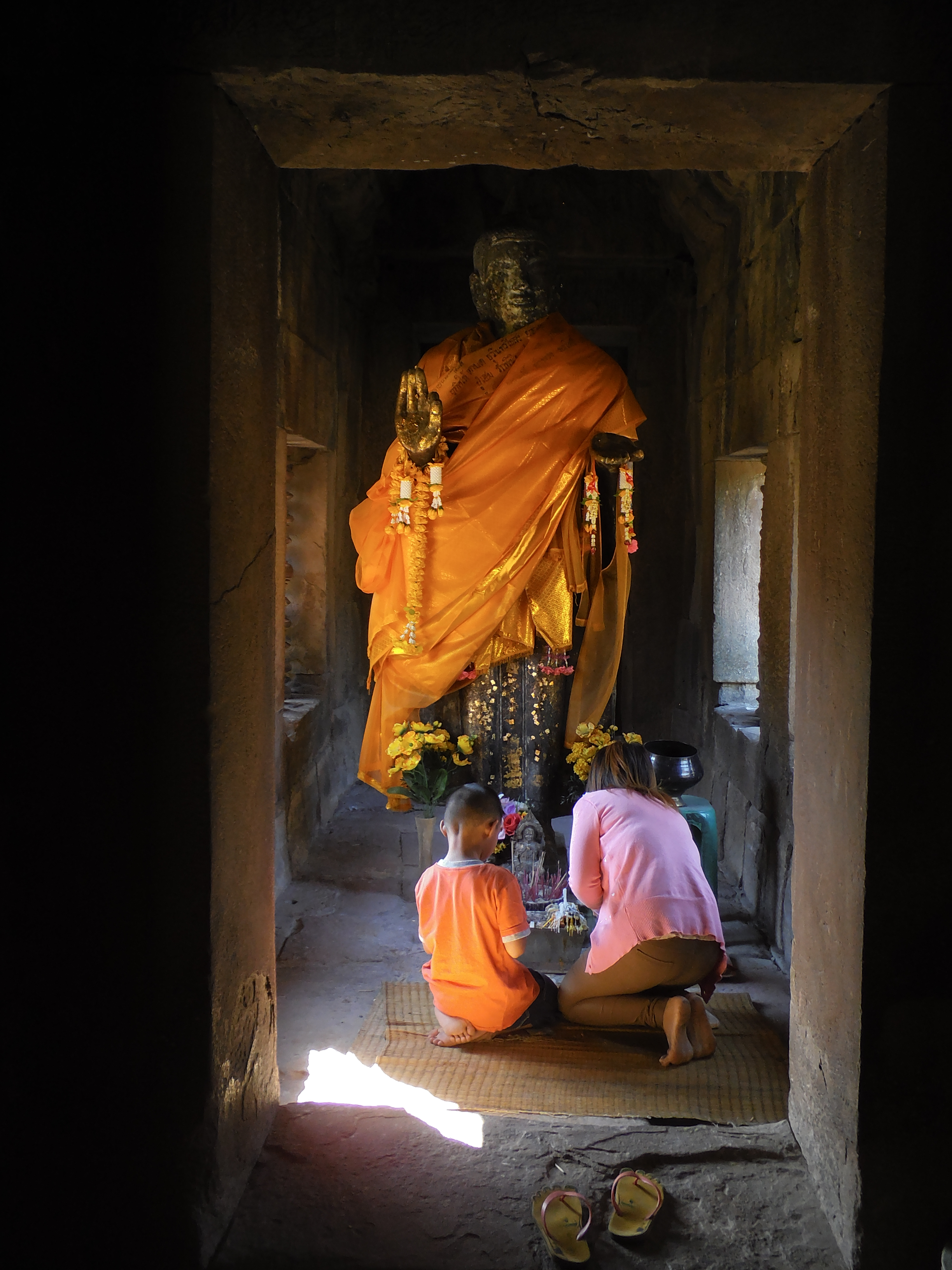
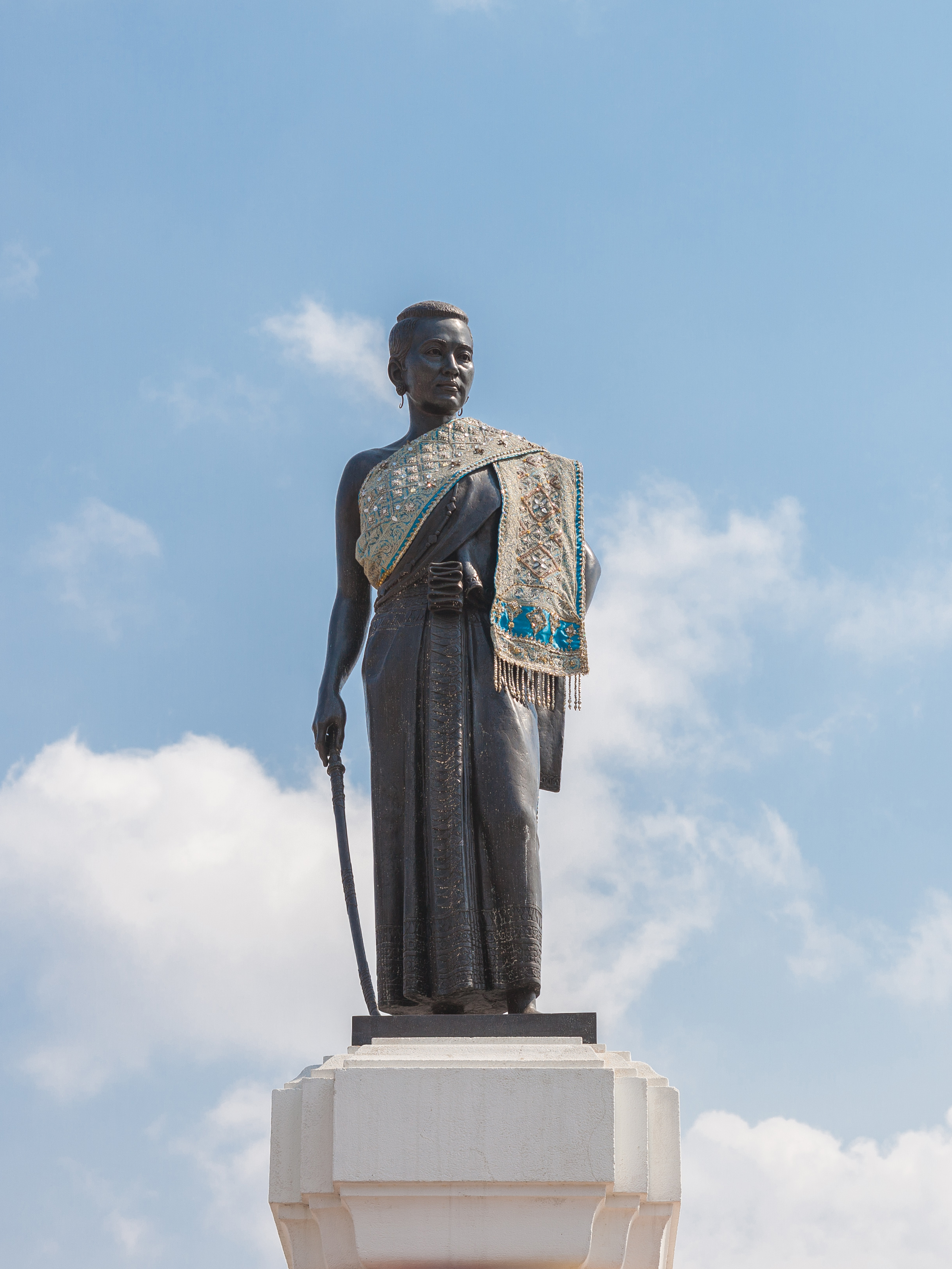
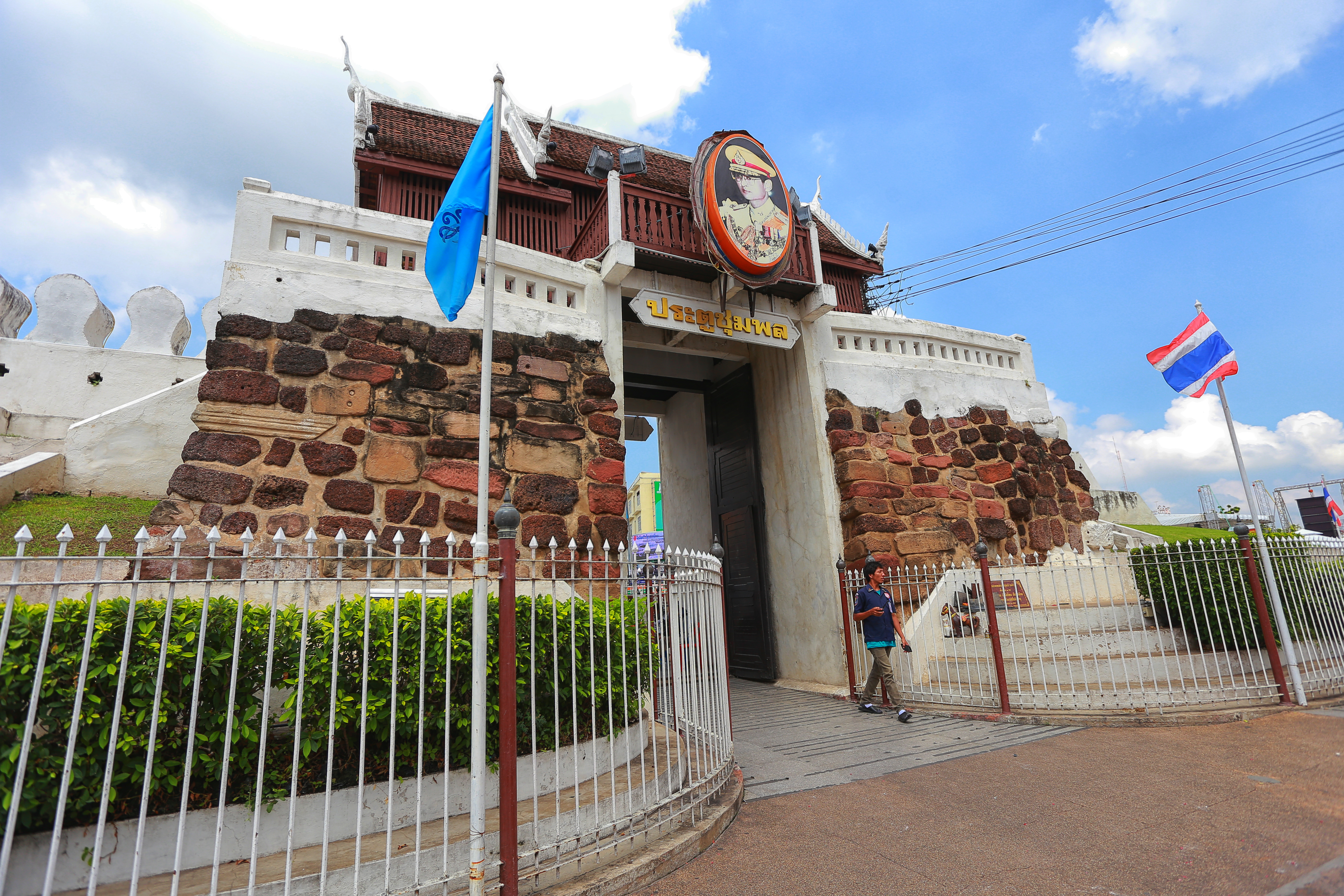
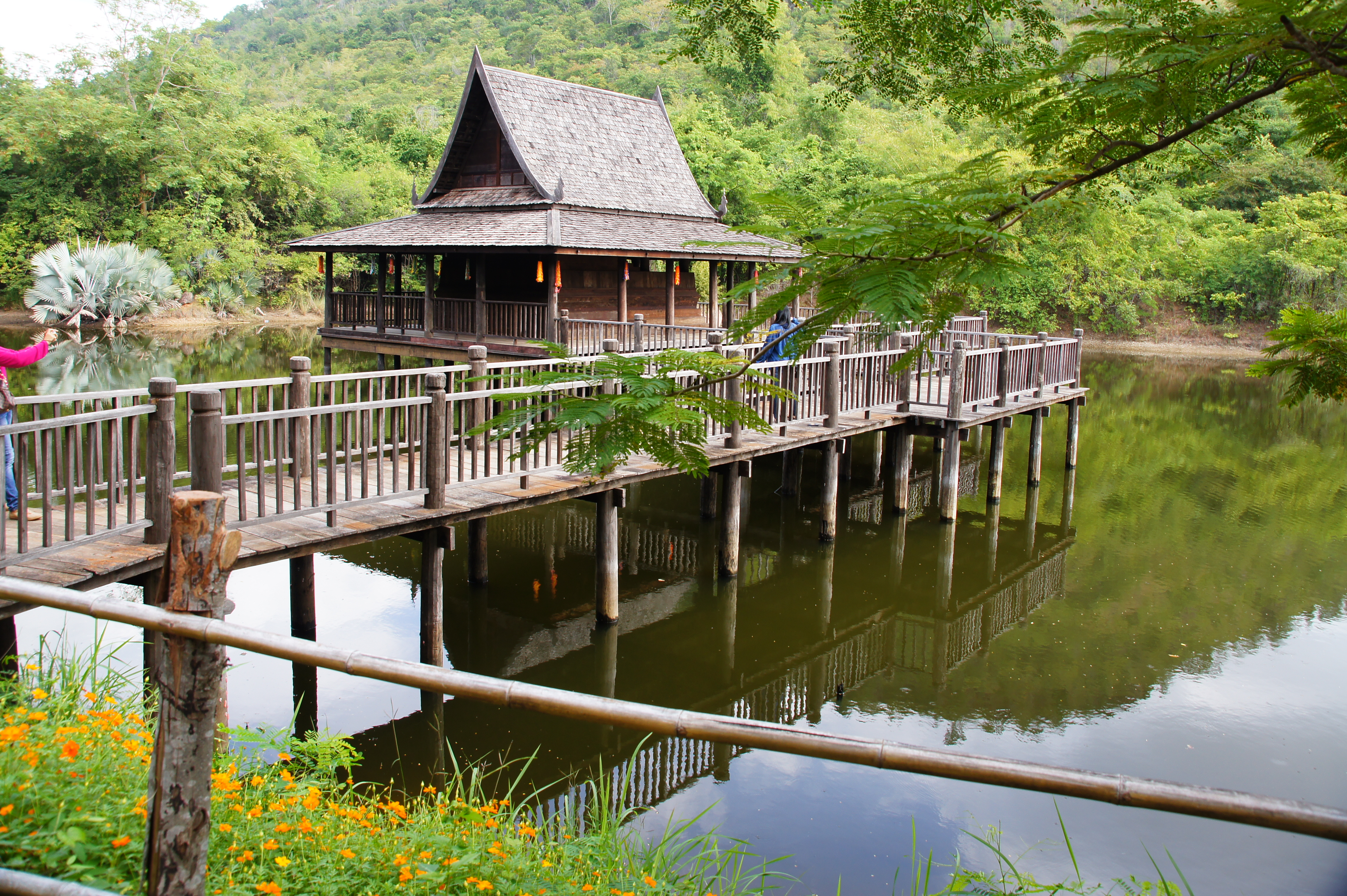
- (clockwise from upper-left): Phimai Castle, Thao Suranaree Monument, Thai house at Jim Thompson Farm, Chum Phon Gate, Buddha statue at Phanom Wan Castle

- Seal
- Nickname: Korat (Thai: โคราช)
- Mottoes: เมืองหญิงกล้า ผ้าไหมดี หมี่โคราช ปราสาทหิน ดินด่านเกวียน ("City of brave women. Excellent silk. Mee Korat. Stone castles. Dan Kwian clay.")
- Map of Thailand highlighting Nakhon Ratchasima province
- Coordinates: 14°58′20″N 102°6′0″E
- Country: Thailand
- Capital: Nakhon Ratchasima City

Government
  - Type: Province; Provincial Administrative Organization
  - Body: Nakhon Ratchasima Province (จังหวัดนครราชสีมา); Nakhon Ratchasima Provincial Administrative Organization (องค์การบริหารส่วนจังหวัดนครราชสีมา)
  - Governor: Chaiwat Chuenkosum
  - PAO Chief Executive: Yalada Wangsuphakitkoson

Area
  - Total: 20,736 km^{2} (8,006 sq mi)
  - Rank: 2nd

Population (2024)
  - Total: ▼2,620,172
  - Rank: 2nd
  - Density: 126/km^{2} (330/sq mi)
  - Rank: 36th

Human Achievement Index
  - HAI (2022): 0.6471 "average" Ranked 30th

GDP
  - Total: baht 275 billion (US$9.5 billion) (2019)
- Time zone: UTC+7 (ICT)
- Postal code: 30xxx
- Calling code: 044
- ISO 3166 code: TH-30
- Website: nakhonratchasima.go.th

Nakhon Ratchasima (Thai: นครราชสีมา, pronounced [ná(ʔ).kʰɔ̄ːn râːt.tɕʰā.sǐː.māː]; Northeastern Thai: นครราชสีมา, pronounced [nà(ʔ).kʰɔ̂ːn lâːt.sā.sǐː.mâː], often called Khorat ((alternate spelling Korat; Thai: โคราช, pronounced [kʰōː.râːt]; Northeastern Thai: โคราช, pronounced [kʰôː.lâːt]) is one of Thailand's seventy-six provinces (changwat) and lies in lower northeastern Thailand also called Isan. At 20,736 square kilometres (8,006 sq mi) it is the country's second largest province by area, has a population of approximately 2.6 million, and generates about 250 billion baht in GDP, the highest in Isan. Neighbouring provinces are (clockwise, from north) Chaiyaphum, Khon Kaen, Buriram, Sa Kaeo, Prachinburi, Nakhon Nayok, Saraburi, and Lopburi.

The capital of the province is the city of Nakhon Ratchasima in Mueang Nakhon Ratchasima district, also called Khorat.

== Geography ==
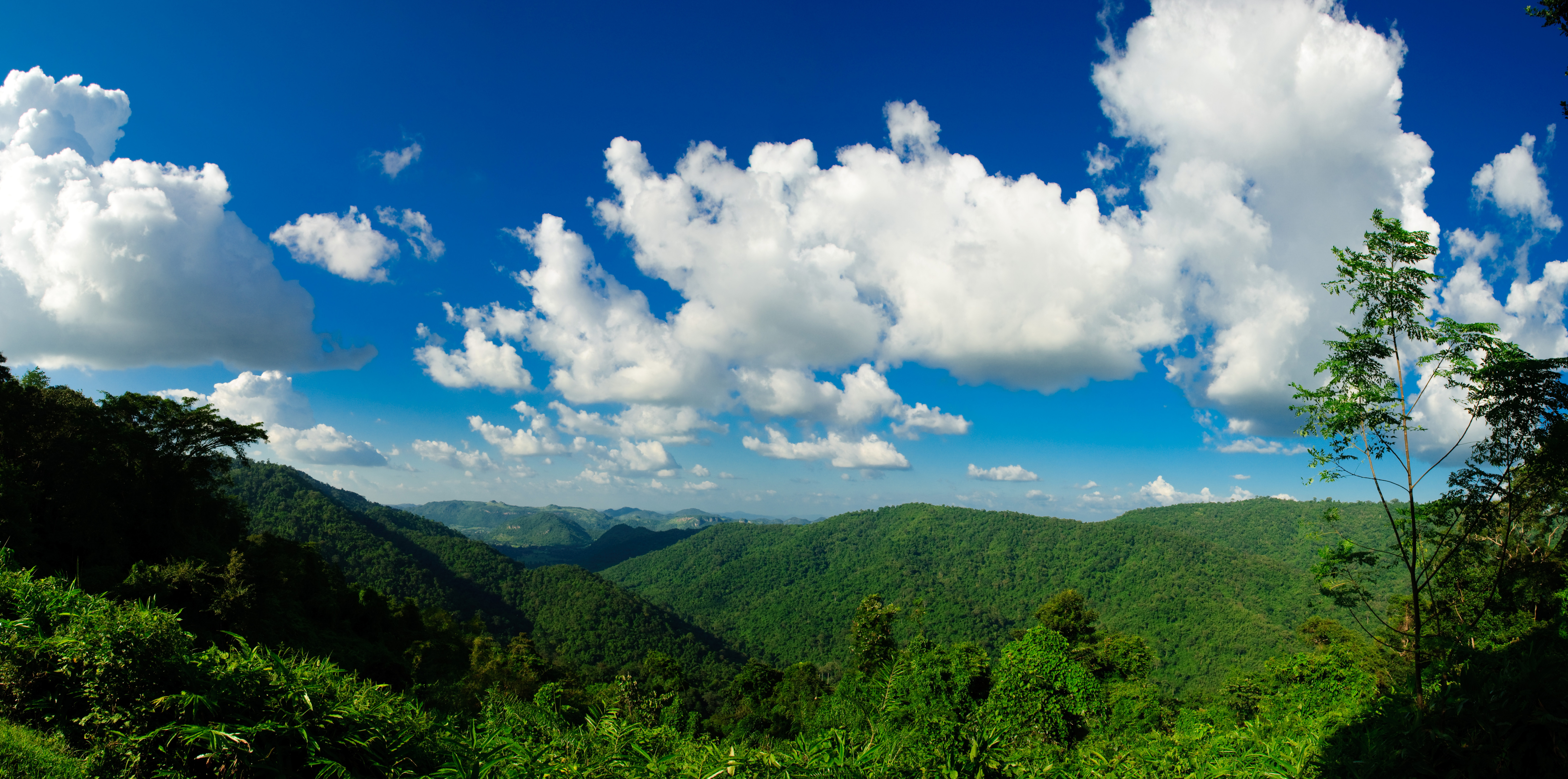
Khao Yai National Park

The province is at the west end of the Khorat Plateau, separated from the Chao Phraya river valley by the Phetchabun and Dong Phaya Yen mountain ranges. Two national parks are in the province: Khao Yai in the west and Thap Lan in the south. Both parks are in the forested mountains of the Sankamphaeng Range, the southern prolongation of the Dong Phaya Yen mountains. The total forest area is 3,193 km^{2} (1,233 sq mi) or 15.4 percent of provincial area.

Nakhon Ratchasima is a large province on the northeastern plateau and acts as a gateway to other provinces in the northeast. It is 259 kilometres (161 mi) from Bangkok and has an area of around 20,494 square kilometres (7,913 sq mi). The province is rich in Khmer culture and has a long history.

=== National parks ===
There are two national parks, along with two other national parks, make up region 1 (Prachinburi) of Thailand's protected areas. (Visitors in fiscal year 2024)

Thap Lan National Park	2,236 km^{2} (863 sq mi)	(96,852)
Khao Yai National Park	2,166 km^{2} (836 sq mi)	(1,887,335)

== History ==
Historical affiliations

Khmer Empire 802–1431
Kingdom of Lan Xang 1431–1664
Kingdom of Ayutthaya 1664-1767
Viceroy of Phimai 1767-1768
Kingdom of Thonburi 1768-1782
Kingdom of Siam 1782–1932
Kingdom of Thailand 1932–present

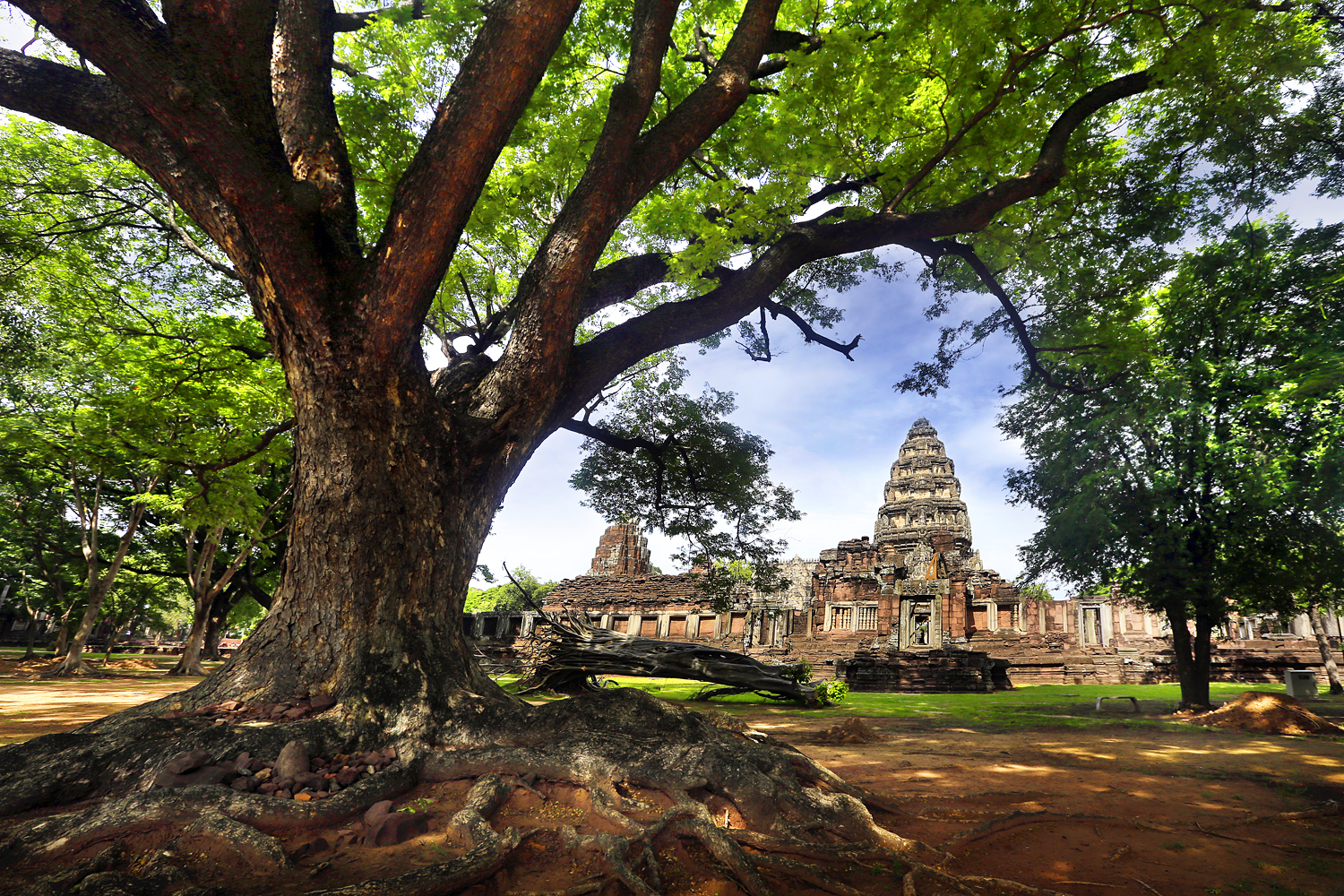
Phimai historical park

The area around Khorat was already an important centre in the times of the Khmer empire in the 11th century, as can be seen by the temple ruins in Phimai historical park.

== Administrative divisions ==
=== Provincial government ===
The province is divided into 32 districts (amphoes). The districts are further subdivided into 263 sub-districts (tambons) and 3,743 villages (mubans).

Map of thirty-two districts

1. Mueang Nakhon Ratchasima
2. Khon Buri
3. Soeng Sang
4. Khong
5. Ban Lueam
6. Chakkarat
7. Chok Chai
8. Dan Khun Thot
9. Non Thai
10. Non Sung
11. Kham Sakaesaeng
12. Bua Yai
13. Prathai
14. Pak Thong Chai
15. Phimai
16. Huai Thalaeng
17. Chum Phuang
18. Sung Noen
19. Kham Thale So
20. Sikhio
21. Pak Chong
22. Nong Bun Mak
23. Kaeng Sanam Nang
24. Non Daeng
25. Wang Nam Khiao
26. Thepharak
27. Mueang Yang
28. Phra Thong Kham
29. Lam Thamenchai
30. Bua Lai
31. Sida
32. Chaloem Phra Kiat

Districts General Information
Class	Name	Area (km^{2})	Distance to Provincial Hall (km)	Established	Sub-districts (Units)	Villages (Units)	Population		
Class	Name	Area (km^{2})	Distance to Provincial Hall (km)	Established	Sub-districts (Units)	Villages (Units)	Male	Female	Total
Special	Mueang Nakhon Ratchasima	755.596	0	1895	25	243	212,627	221,211	433,838
1	Dan Khun Thot	1,428.14	84	1908	16	220	62,571	63,347	125,918
1	Bua Yai	305.028	101	1886	10	121	41,855	42,278	84,133
1	Pak Thong Chai	1,374.32	34	1910	16	213	56,716	58,950	115,666
1	Phimai	896.871	60	1900	12	208	64,421	66,024	130,445
1	Sikhio	1,247.07	45	1955	12	169	60,898	61,163	122,061
1	Pak Chong	1,825.17	85	1955	12	217	91,146	91,685	182,831
2	Khon Buri	1,816.85	58	1939	12	152	46,086	47,167	93,253
2	Chakkarat	501.672	40	1953	8	108	34,441	34,643	69,084
2	Chok Chai	503.917	30	1905	10	126	37,297	39,223	76,520
2	Non Sung	676.981	37	1897	16	195	62,639	65,374	128,013
2	Prathai	600.648	97	1961	13	148	38,622	38,761	77,282
2	Sung Noen	782.853	36	1901	11	125	38,429	40,181	78,610
2	Huai Thalaeng	495.175	65	1961	10	120	37,443	37,131	74,574
2	Chum Phuang	540.567	98	1959	9	130	40,918	41,038	82,161
3	Soeng Sang	1,200.24	88	1976	6	84	33,733	33,302	67,032
3	Khong	454.737	79	1938	10	155	40,052	41,076	81,128
3	Non Thai	541.994	28	1900	10	131	36,126	37,592	73,718
3	Kham Sakaesaeng	297.769	50	1968	7	72	21,423	21,753	43,176
3	Kaeng Sanam Nang	107.258	130	1986	5	56	18,782	19,054	37,836
3	Wang Nam Khiao	1,130.00	70	1992	5	83	20,416	20,503	40,910
4	Ban Lueam	218.875	85	1976	4	39	10,620	10,732	21,351
4	Nong Bunmak	590.448	52	1983	9	104	29,424	29,316	58,740
4	Thepharak	357.465	90	1995	4	58	12,002	11,451	23,453
4	Phra Thong Kham	359.522	45	1996	5	74	21,260	21,680	42,940
4	Sida	162.825	85	1997	5	50	12,087	12,133	24,220
4	Bua Lai	106.893	103	1997	4	45	12,374	12,450	24,824
4	Non Daeng	193.407	30	1989	5	65	12,597	12,984	25,581
4	Kham Thale So	203.605	22	1966	5	46	14,091	14,021	28,112
4	Mueang Yang	255.522	110	1995	4	44	14,321	14,038	28,359
4	Lam Thamenchai	308.457	120	1996	4	59	16,114	15,953	32,067
4	Chaloem Phra Kiat	254.093	18	1996	5	61	16,966	17,411	34,377

=== Local government ===
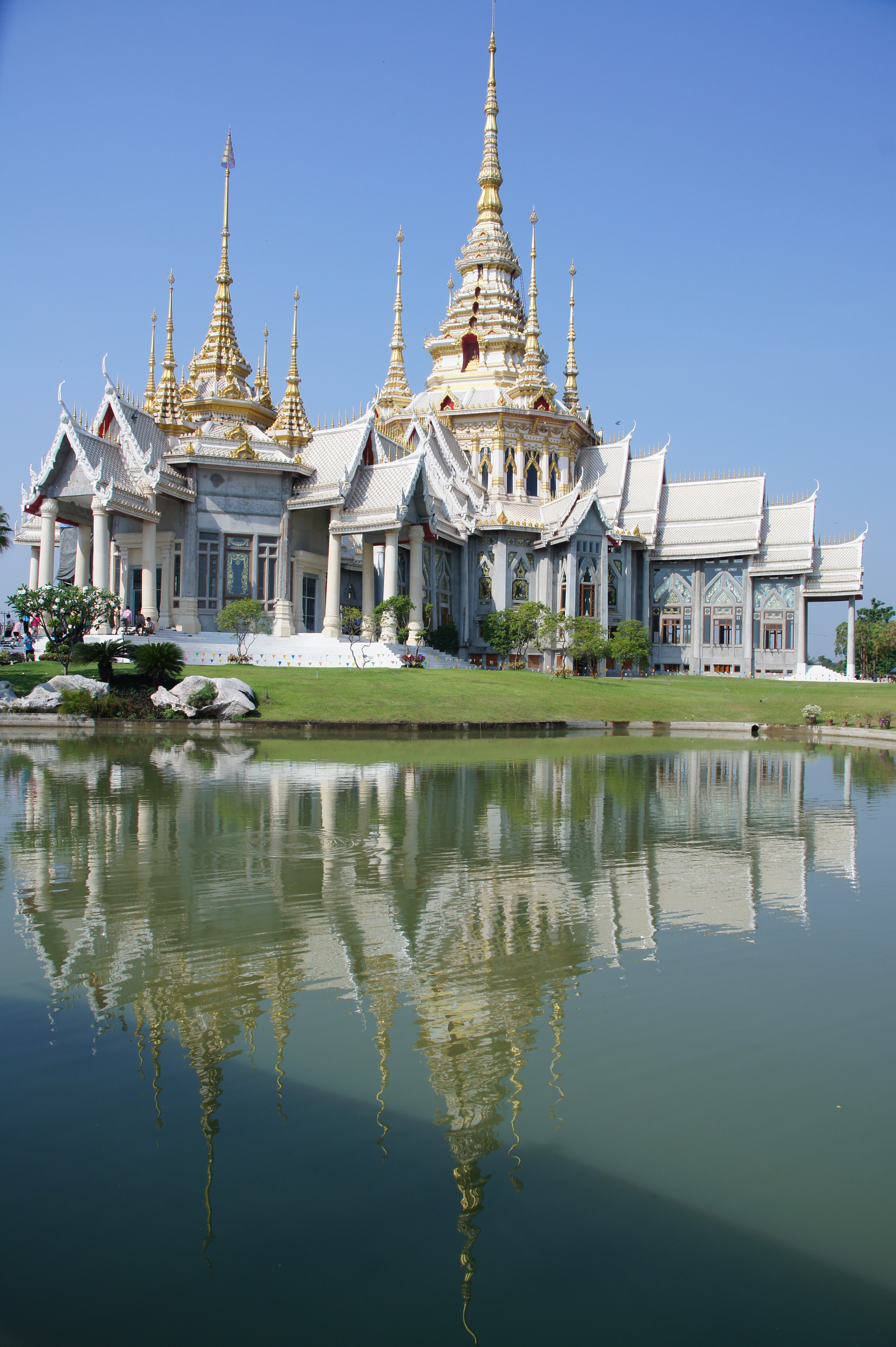
The Great Hall of Wat Luang Phor Toh in Sikhio district

As of 26 November 2019 there are: one Nakhon Ratchasima Provincial Administration Organisation (ongkan borihan suan changwat) and 90 municipal (thesaban) areas in the province. Nakhon Ratchasima municipality has city (thesaban nakhon) status. Bua Yai, Mueang Pak, Pak Chong and Sikhio municipalities have town (thesaban mueang) status. Further 85 subdistrict municipalities (thesaban tambon).The non-municipal areas are administered by 243 Subdistrict Administrative Organisations - SAO (ongkan borihan suan tambon). Nakhon Ratchasima is also home of the Klongpai Central Prison.

== Economy ==
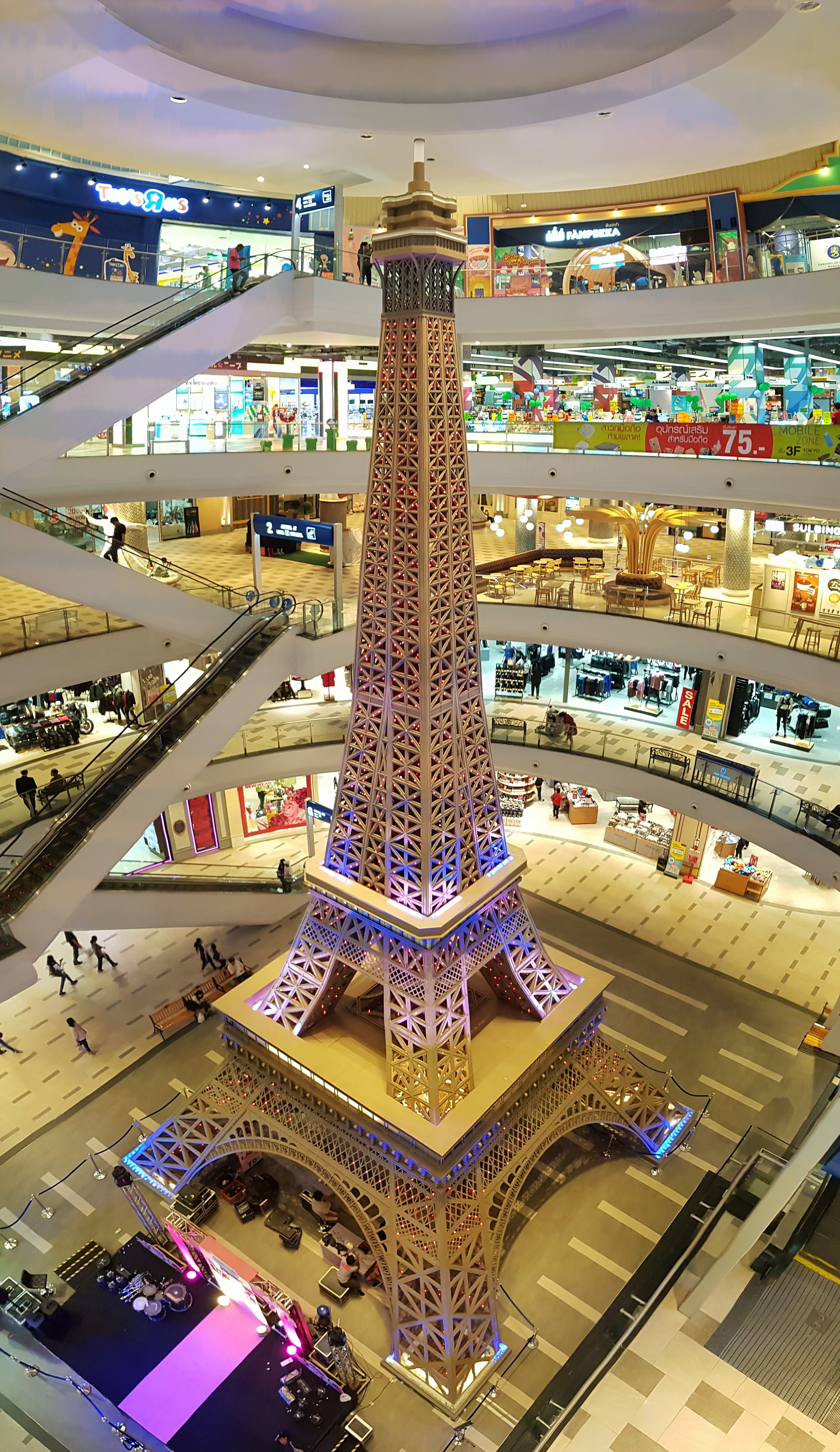
One of the halls inside Terminal 21 Shopping Mall

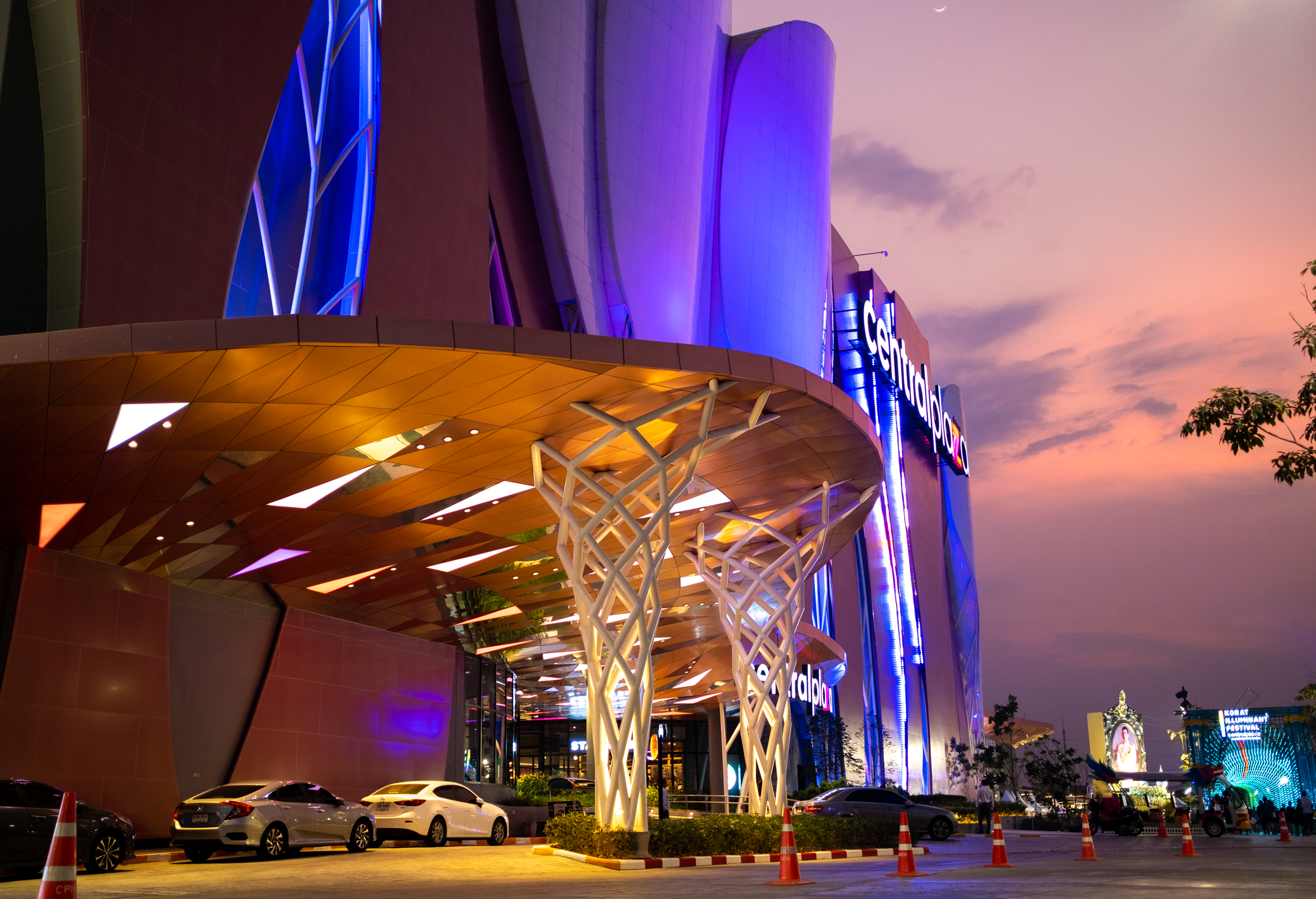
CentralPlaza at sunset

Khorat's economy has traditionally been heavily dependent on agriculture. It is known as a processing centre for Isan's production of rice, tapioca, and sugar. The Isan region accounts for half of Thailand's exports of those commodities. Khorat is also one of two sites in Thailand manufacturing disk drives by Seagate Technology, employing 12,100 workers in Khorat.

== Transport ==
=== Air ===
Nakhon Ratchasima has Nakhon Ratchasima Airport, but it has no scheduled flights. The nearest working airport is in Buriram and has flights to and from Bangkok.

=== Rail ===
The railway system in Nakhon Ratchasima is on both northeastern routes from Bangkok Railway Station. Nakhon Ratchasima province has eight main railway stations. In 2017, a 60-kilometre dual-track line will connect Korat to Khon Kaen province. It is the first segment of a dual track network that will connect Isan with the Laem Chabang seaport. Mueang District is served by two stations: Nakhon Ratchasima railway station and Thanon Chira Junction railway station.

=== Road ===
Highway 2 (Mittraphap Road) is the main route that connects nine districts in Nakhon Ratchasima including Muang district. This route also connects Nakhon Ratchasima to Saraburi and Khon Kaen provinces. Hwy 24 links Si Khio District from Hwy 2 to Pak Thongcha, Chok Chai, and Nong Bunnak Districts and to Buriram province. A new motorway connecting Khorat to Bangkok is under construction in 2016 and will reduce travel time on the 250 kilometre journey to just over two hours.

== Health ==
Nakhon Ratchasima has hospitals in mostly the public sector, but some in the private sector. Its main hospital is Maharat Nakhon Ratchasima Hospital, which is the largest provincial hospital operated by the Ministry of Public Health and one of the main hospitals for the MOPH-Mahidol CPIRD Program.

== Education ==
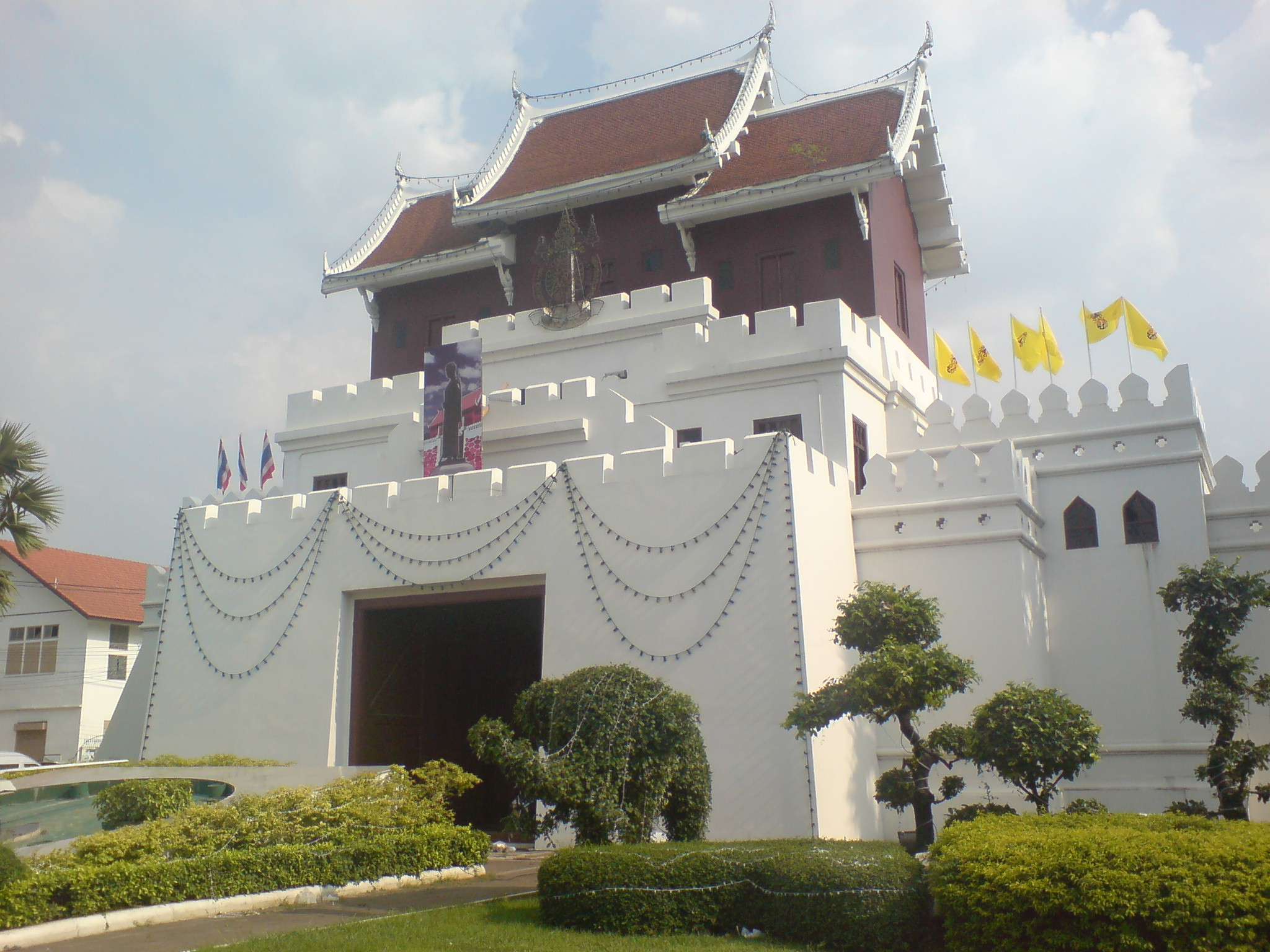
Main gate of Khorat

=== Universities ===
There are four universities in the area.

- Nakhon Ratchasima Rajabhat University
- Rajamangala University of Technology Isan
- Suranaree University of Technology
- Vongchavalitkul University

=== Schools ===
- Ratchasima Wittayalai School
- Saint Mary's College Nakhon Ratchasima
- Suranaree Wittaya School
- MBAC
- Boonwatthana
- Phimai Witthaya
- Assumption School Nakhon Ratchasima
- Fort Surathamphithak School
- Phoowittaya School (lab school project)
- Plookpanya School
- Koratpittayakom school
- Wangrongnoi school
- Phatongkhamwittaya school
- Surawiwat school in Suranaree University of Technology
- Metapaht School

=== International schools ===
- St Stephen's International School (SIS) (Khao Yai Campus)
- Adventists International Mission School (AIMS) (Nakhon Ratchasima Campus)
- Anglo Singapore International School (Korat Campus)
- Wesley International School

== Human achievement index 2022 ==
Health	Education	Employment	Income
33	58	10	55
Housing	Family	Transport	Participation
29	26	58	30
Province Krabi, with an HAI 2022 value of 0.6471 is "average", occupies place 30 in the ranking.

Since 2003, United Nations Development Programme (UNDP) in Thailand has tracked progress on human development at sub-national level using the Human achievement index (HAI), a composite index covering all the eight key areas of human development. The National Economic and Social Development Board (NESDB) took over this task in 2017.

Rank	Classification
1–13	"High"
14–29	"Somewhat high"
30–45	"Average"
46–61	"Somewhat low"
62–77	"Low"

Map with provinces and HAI 2022 rankings

== Korat cat ==
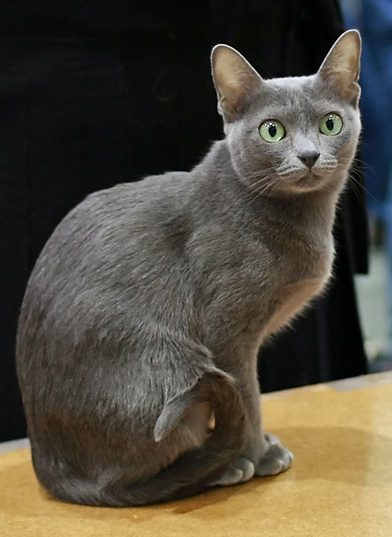
Korat Cat (si sawat)

The Korat cat (Thai: โคราช, มาเลศ, สีสวาด, RTGS: Khorat, malet, si sawat) is a natural breed, and one of the oldest stable cat breeds. Originating in Nakhon Ratchasima province at Phimai, it is named after its province of origin. In Thailand the breed is known as si sawat, meaning "colour of the sawat seed" (bluish-gray). Korat cats are distinguished not only by the colour of their fur. Genuine Korat cats have a heart-shaped face when viewed from any angle and shorter grey hair with silver tips. The true breed's eyes are yellow with an inner green circle. They must be slender and agile. The cat's tail must be slender. Cats with crooked tails are considered inauspicious.

In 1965, Korat cats were first registered in the US by the Korat Cat Fanciers Association. The cats that formed the breed were first imported from Thailand by Jean L. Johnson in 1959. In 1966 the breed was accepted by the Cat Fanciers' Association (CFA). The Korat breed is now accepted by cat associations around the world.

The International Maew Boran Association (TIMBA; "maew boran" means "ancient cat") was formed in Thailand to provide a registry of and pedigrees for Thai cats, including Korats, and to provide a voice in English for Thai breeders as "...Thai breeders...do not speak English, and farang breeders do not speak Thai."
