= Bua Yai district =

Bua Yai บัวใหญ่
- District
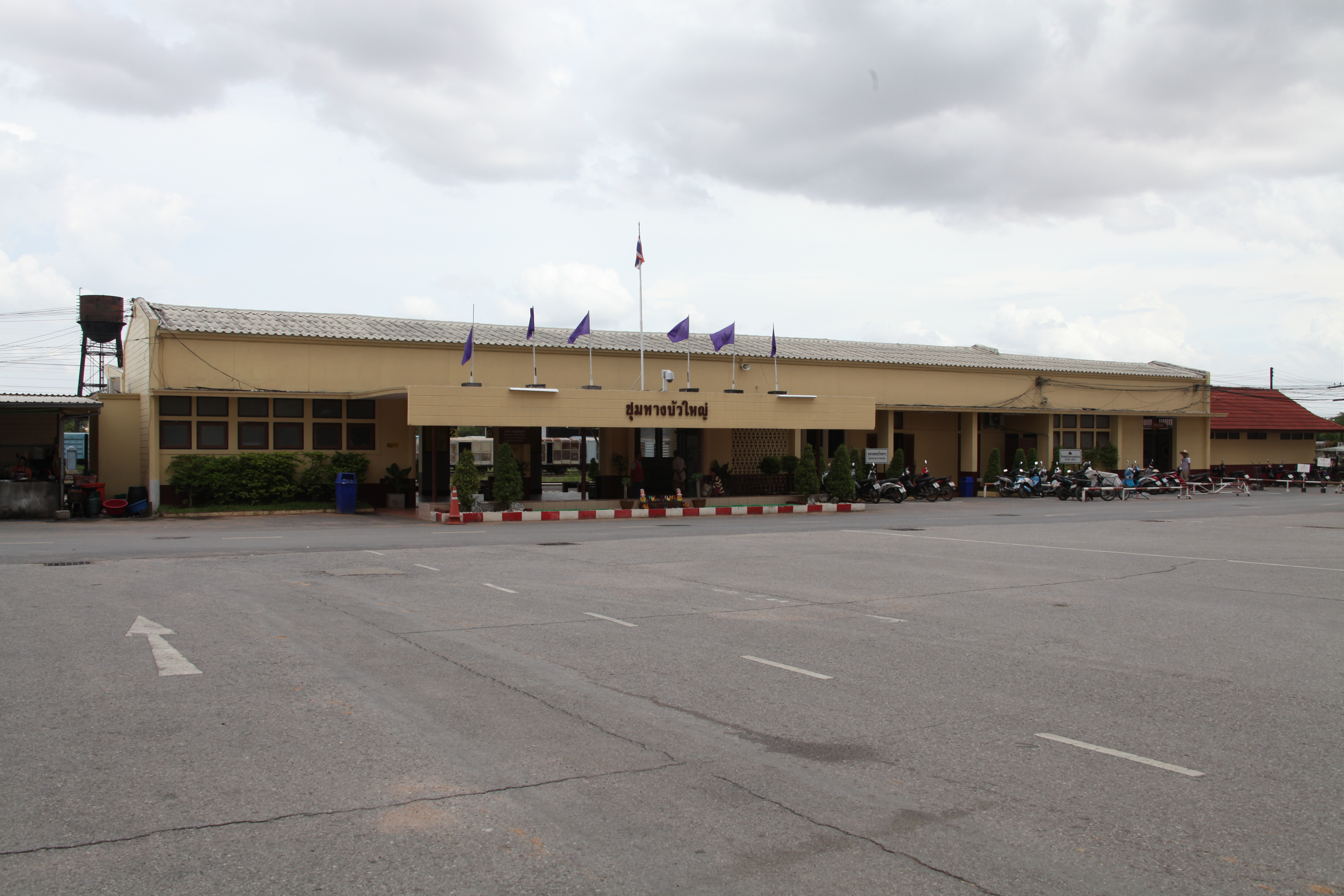
- Bua Yai Junction railway station

- District location in Nakhon Ratchasima province
- Coordinates: 15°34′59″N 102°25′23″E
- Country: Thailand
- Province: Nakhon Ratchasima
- Seat: Bua Yai

Area
  - Total: 271.6 km^{2} (104.9 sq mi)

Population (2016)
  - Total: 84,133
  - Density: 319.5/km^{2} (828/sq mi)
- Time zone: UTC+7 (ICT)
- Postal code: 30120
- Geocode: 3012

Bua Yai (Thai: บัวใหญ่, pronounced [būa jàj], Northeastern Thai: บัวใหญ่, pronounced [bùa ɲāj]) is a district (amphoe) in the northern part of Nakhon Ratchasima province, northern central Thailand.

== Administration ==
The district is divided into 10 sub-districts and 121 villages.
