= List of tambon in Thailand (M) =

This is a list of tambon (sub-districts) in Thailand, beginning with the letter M. This information is subject to change due to border changes or re-allocation of tambons. Missing tambon numbers show where the number is either not used or the tambon has been transferred to a different amphoe (district).

Tambon	ตำบล	Amphoe (District)	อำเภอ	Changwat (Province)	จังหวัด	Region
Ma-ue	มะอึ	Thawat Buri	ธวัชบุรี	Roi Et	ร้อยเอ็ด	Northeast
Maba	มะบ้า	Thung Khao Luang	ทุ่งเขาหลวง	Roi Et	ร้อยเอ็ด	Northeast
Mae Ai	แม่อาย	Mae Ai	แม่อาย	Chiang Mai	เชียงใหม่	North
Mae Chai	แม่ใจ	Mae Chai	แม่ใจ	Phayao	พะเยา	North
Mae Chan	แม่จัน	Umphang	อุ้มผาง	Tak	ตาก	West
Mae Chan	แม่จัน	Mae Chan	แม่จัน	Chiang Rai	เชียงราย	North
Mae Chao Yu Hua	แม่เจ้าอยู่หัว	Chian Yai	เชียรใหญ่	Nakhon Si Thammarat	นครศรีธรรมราช	South
Mae Charao	แม่จะเรา	Mae Ramat	แม่ระมาด	Tak	ตาก	West
Mae Chedi	แม่เจดีย์	Wiang Pa Pao	เวียงป่าเป้า	Chiang Rai	เชียงราย	North
Mae Chedi Mai	แม่เจดีย์ใหม่	Wiang Pa Pao	เวียงป่าเป้า	Chiang Rai	เชียงราย	North
Mae Chua	แม่จั๊วะ	Den Chai	เด่นชัย	Phrae	แพร่	North
Mae Daet	แม่แดด	Galyani Vadhana	กัลยาณิวัฒนา	Chiang Mai	เชียงใหม่	North
Mae Dong	แม่ดง	Waeng	แว้ง	Narathiwat	นราธิวาส	South
Mae Fa Luang	แม่ฟ้าหลวง	Mae Fa Luang	แม่ฟ้าหลวง	Chiang Rai	เชียงราย	North
Mae Faek	แม่แฝก	San Sai	สันทราย	Chiang Mai	เชียงใหม่	North
Mae Faek Mai	แม่แฝกใหม่	San Sai	สันทราย	Chiang Mai	เชียงใหม่	North
Mae Hi	แม่ฮี้	Pai	ปาย	Mae Hong Son	แม่ฮ่องสอน	North
Mae Hia	แม่เหียะ	Mueang Chiang Mai	เมืองเชียงใหม่	Chiang Mai	เชียงใหม่	North
Mae Ho	แม่เหาะ	Mae Sariang	แม่สะเรียง	Mae Hong Son	แม่ฮ่องสอน	North
Mae Ho Phra	แม่หอพระ	Mae Taeng	แม่แตง	Chiang Mai	เชียงใหม่	North
Mae Hoi Ngoen	แม่ฮ้อยเงิน	Doi Saket	ดอยสะเก็ด	Chiang Mai	เชียงใหม่	North
Mae Ing	แม่อิง	Phu Kamyao	ภูกามยาว	Phayao	พะเยา	North
Mae Ka	แม่กา	Mueang Phayao	เมืองพะเยา	Phayao	พะเยา	North
Mae Ka	แม่ก๊า	San Pa Tong	สันป่าตอง	Chiang Mai	เชียงใหม่	North
Mae Kasa	แม่กาษา	Mae Sot	แม่สอด	Tak	ตาก	West
Mae Kha	แม่ข่า	Fang	ฝาง	Chiang Mai	เชียงใหม่	North
Mae Kha	แม่คะ	Fang	ฝาง	Chiang Mai	เชียงใหม่	North
Mae Kham	แม่คำ	Mae Chan	แม่จัน	Chiang Rai	เชียงราย	North
Mae Kham Mi	แม่คำมี	Nong Muang Khai	หนองม่วงไข่	Phrae	แพร่	North
Mae Kham Mi	แม่คำมี	Mueang Phrae	เมืองแพร่	Phrae	แพร่	North
Mae Khaning	แม่ขะนิง	Wiang Sa	เวียงสา	Nan	น่าน	North
Mae Khao Tom	แม่ข้าวต้ม	Mueang Chiang Rai	เมืองเชียงราย	Chiang Rai	เชียงราย	North
Mae Khari	แม่ขรี	Tamot	ตะโหมด	Phatthalung	พัทลุง	South
Mae Khatuan	แม่คะตวน	Sop Moei	สบเมย	Mae Hong Son	แม่ฮ่องสอน	North
Mae Khlong	แม่กลอง	Umphang	อุ้มผาง	Tak	ตาก	West
Mae Khong	แม่คง	Mae Sariang	แม่สะเรียง	Mae Hong Son	แม่ฮ่องสอน	North
Mae Khue	แม่คือ	Doi Saket	ดอยสะเก็ด	Chiang Mai	เชียงใหม่	North
Mae Ki	แม่กิ๊	Khun Yuam	ขุนยวม	Mae Hong Son	แม่ฮ่องสอน	North
Mae Klong	แม่กลอง	Mueang Samut Songkhram	เมืองสมุทรสงคราม	Samut Songkhram	สมุทรสงคราม	Central
Mae Koeng	แม่เกิ๋ง	Wang Chin	วังชิ้น	Phrae	แพร่	North
Mae Kon	แม่กรณ์	Mueang Chiang Rai	เมืองเชียงราย	Chiang Rai	เชียงราย	North
Mae Krabung	แม่กระบุง	Si Sawat	ศรีสวัสดิ์	Kanchanaburi	กาญจนบุรี	West
Mae Ku	แม่กุ	Mae Sot	แม่สอด	Tak	ตาก	West
Mae Kua	แม่กัวะ	Sop Prap	สบปราบ	Lampang	ลำปาง	North
Mae La	แม่ลา	Bang Rachan	บางระจัน	Sing Buri	สิงห์บุรี	Central
Mae La	แม่ลา	Nakhon Luang	นครหลวง	Phra Nakhon Si Ayutthaya	พระนครศรีอยุธยา	Central
Mae La	แม่หละ	Tha Song Yang	ท่าสองยาง	Tak	ตาก	West
Mae La Luang	แม่ลาหลวง	Mae La Noi	แม่ลาน้อย	Mae Hong Son	แม่ฮ่องสอน	North
Mae La Noi	แม่ลาน้อย	Mae La Noi	แม่ลาน้อย	Mae Hong Son	แม่ฮ่องสอน	North
Mae Lai	แม่หล่าย	Mueang Phrae	เมืองแพร่	Phrae	แพร่	North
Mae Lamung	แม่ละมุ้ง	Umphang	อุ้มผาง	Tak	ตาก	West
Mae Lan	แม่ลาน	Mae Lan	แม่ลาน	Pattani	ปัตตานี	South
Mae Lan	แม่ลาน	Li	ลี้	Lamphun	ลำพูน	North
Mae Lao	แม่ลาว	Chiang Kham	เชียงคำ	Phayao	พะเยา	North
Mae Lat	แม่ลาด	Khlong Khlung	คลองขลุง	Kamphaeng Phet	กำแพงเพชร	Central
Mae Le	แม่เล่ย์	Mae Wong	แม่วงก์	Nakhon Sawan	นครสวรรค์	Central
Mae Loi	แม่ลอย	Thoeng	เทิง	Chiang Rai	เชียงราย	North
Mae Mo	แม่เมาะ	Mae Mo	แม่เมาะ	Lampang	ลำปาง	North
Mae Mok	แม่มอก	Thoen	เถิน	Lampang	ลำปาง	North
Mae Na	แม่นะ	Chiang Dao	เชียงดาว	Chiang Mai	เชียงใหม่	North
Mae Na Chang	แม่นาจาง	Mae La Noi	แม่ลาน้อย	Mae Hong Son	แม่ฮ่องสอน	North
Mae Na Chon	แม่นาจร	Mae Chaem	แม่แจ่ม	Chiang Mai	เชียงใหม่	North
Mae Na Ruea	แม่นาเรือ	Mueang Phayao	เมืองพะเยา	Phayao	พะเยา	North
Mae Na Toeng	แม่นาเติง	Pai	ปาย	Mae Hong Son	แม่ฮ่องสอน	North
Mae Na Wang	แม่นาวาง	Mae Ai	แม่อาย	Chiang Mai	เชียงใหม่	North
Mae Nam	แม่น้ำ	Ko Samui	เกาะสมุย	Surat Thani	สุราษฎร์ธานี	South
Mae Nang Khao	แม่นางขาว	Khura Buri	คุระบุรี	Phang Nga	พังงา	South
Mae Ngao	แม่เงา	Khun Yuam	ขุนยวม	Mae Hong Son	แม่ฮ่องสอน	North
Mae Ngoen	แม่เงิน	Chiang Saen	เชียงแสน	Chiang Rai	เชียงราย	North
Mae Ngon	แม่งอน	Fang	ฝาง	Chiang Mai	เชียงใหม่	North
Mae O	แม่อ้อ	Phan	พาน	Chiang Rai	เชียงราย	North
Mae Pa	แม่ปะ	Mae Sot	แม่สอด	Tak	ตาก	West
Mae Pah	แม่ปะ	Thoen	เถิน	Lampang	ลำปาง	North
Mae Pak	แม่ป้าก	Wang Chin	วังชิ้น	Phrae	แพร่	North
Mae Pan	แม่ปาน	Long	ลอง	Phrae	แพร่	North
Mae Pang	แม่ปั๋ง	Phrao	พร้าว	Chiang Mai	เชียงใหม่	North
Mae Pao	แม่เปา	Phaya Mengrai	พญาเม็งราย	Chiang Rai	เชียงราย	North
Mae Phrik	แม่พริก	Mae Phrik	แม่ริม	Lampang	ลำปาง	North
Mae Phrik	แม่พริก	Mae Suai	แม่สรวย	Chiang Rai	เชียงราย	North
Mae Phun	แม่พูล	Laplae	ลับแล	Uttaradit	อุตรดิตถ์	North
Mae Phung	แม่พุง	Wang Chin	วังชิ้น	Phrae	แพร่	North
Mae Poen	แม่เปิน	Mae Poen	แม่เปิน	Nakhon Sawan	นครสวรรค์	Central
Mae Pong	แม่โป่ง	Doi Saket	ดอยสะเก็ด	Chiang Mai	เชียงใหม่	North
Mae Pu	แม่ปุ	Mae Phrik	แม่ริม	Lampang	ลำปาง	North
Mae Pu Kha	แม่ปูคา	San Kamphaeng	สันกำแพง	Chiang Mai	เชียงใหม่	North
Mae Puem	แม่ปืม	Mueang Phayao	เมืองพะเยา	Phayao	พะเยา	North
Mae Raem	แม่แรม	Mae Rim	แม่ริม	Chiang Mai	เชียงใหม่	North
Mae Raeng	แม่แรง	Pa Sang	ป่าซาง	Lamphun	ลำพูน	North
Mae Rai	แม่ไร่	Mae Chan	แม่จัน	Chiang Rai	เชียงราย	North
Mae Raka	แม่ระกา	Wang Thong	วังทอง	Phitsanulok	พิษณุโลก	Central
Mae Ramat	แม่ระมาด	Mae Ramat	แม่ระมาด	Tak	ตาก	West
Mae Ramphueng	แม่รำพึง	Bang Saphan	บางสะพาน	Prachuap Khiri Khan	ประจวบคีรีขันธ์	West
Mae Sa	แม่สา	Wiang Sa	เวียงสา	Nan	น่าน	North
Mae Sa	แม่สา	Mae Rim	แม่ริม	Chiang Mai	เชียงใหม่	North
Mae Sai	แม่ทราย	Rong Kwang	ร้องกวาง	Phrae	แพร่	North
Mae Sai	แม่สาย	Mae Sai	แม่สาย	Chiang Rai	เชียงราย	North
Mae Sai	แม่ใส	Mueang Phayao	เมืองพะเยา	Phayao	พะเยา	North
Mae Sakhon	แม่สาคร	Wiang Sa	เวียงสา	Nan	น่าน	North
Mae Salit	แม่สลิด	Ban Tak	บ้านตาก	Tak	ตาก	West
Mae Salong Nai	แม่สลองใน	Mae Fa Luang	แม่ฟ้าหลวง	Chiang Rai	เชียงราย	North
Mae Salong Nok	แม่สลองนอก	Mae Fa Luang	แม่ฟ้าหลวง	Chiang Rai	เชียงราย	North
Mae Sam	แม่สำ	Si Satchanalai	ศรีสัชนาลัย	Sukhothai	สุโขทัย	Central
Mae Sam Laep	แม่สามแลบ	Sop Moei	สบเมย	Mae Hong Son	แม่ฮ่องสอน	North
Mae San	แม่สัน	Hang Chat	ห้างฉัตร	Lampang	ลำปาง	North
Mae Sao	แม่สาว	Mae Ai	แม่อาย	Chiang Mai	เชียงใหม่	North
Mae Sap	แม่สาบ	Samoeng	สะเมิง	Chiang Mai	เชียงใหม่	North
Mae Sariang	แม่สะเรียง	Mae Sariang	แม่สะเรียง	Mae Hong Son	แม่ฮ่องสอน	North
Mae Sin	แม่สิน	Si Satchanalai	ศรีสัชนาลัย	Sukhothai	สุโขทัย	Central
Mae Soi	แม่สอย	Chom Thong	จอมทอง	Chiang Mai	เชียงใหม่	North
Mae Song	แม่สอง	Tha Song Yang	ท่าสองยาง	Tak	ตาก	West
Mae Sot	แม่สอด	Mae Sot	แม่สอด	Tak	ตาก	West
Mae Suai	แม่สรวย	Mae Suai	แม่สรวย	Chiang Rai	เชียงราย	North
Mae Suat	แม่สวด	Sop Moei	สบเมย	Mae Hong Son	แม่ฮ่องสอน	North
Mae Suek	แม่ศึก	Mae Chaem	แม่แจ่ม	Chiang Mai	เชียงใหม่	North
Mae Suk	แม่สุก	Mae Chai	แม่ใจ	Phayao	พะเยา	North
Mae Suk	แม่สุก	Chae Hom	แจ้ห่ม	Lampang	ลำปาง	North
Mae Sun	แม่สูน	Fang	ฝาง	Chiang Mai	เชียงใหม่	North
Mae Taeng	แม่แตง	Mae Taeng	แม่แตง	Chiang Mai	เชียงใหม่	North
Mae Tam	แม่ต๋ำ	Mueang Phayao	เมืองพะเยา	Phayao	พะเยา	North
Mae Tam	แม่ต๋ำ	Phaya Mengrai	พญาเม็งราย	Chiang Rai	เชียงราย	North
Mae Tan	แม่ต้าน	Tha Song Yang	ท่าสองยาง	Tak	ตาก	West
Mae Tao	แม่ตาว	Mae Sot	แม่สอด	Tak	ตาก	West
Mae Tha	แม่ทะ	Mae Tha	แม่ทะ	Lampang	ลำปาง	North
Mae Tha	แม่ทา	Mae On	แม่ออน	Chiang Mai	เชียงใหม่	North
Mae Thalop	แม่ทะลบ	Chai Prakan	ปราการ	Chiang Mai	เชียงใหม่	North
Mae Tho	แม่โถ	Mae La Noi	แม่ลาน้อย	Mae Hong Son	แม่ฮ่องสอน	North
Mae Tho	แม่ท้อ	Mueang Tak	เมืองตาก	Tak	ตาก	West
Mae Thod	แม่ถอด	Thoen	เถิน	Lampang	ลำปาง	North
Mae Thom	แม่ทอม	Bang Klam	บางกล่ำ	Songkhla	สงขลา	South
Mae Tip	แม่ตีบ	Ngao	งาว	Lampang	ลำปาง	North
Mae Tuen	แม่ตืน	Li	ลี้	Lamphun	ลำพูน	North
Mae Tuen	แม่ตื่น	Omkoi	อมก๋อย	Chiang Mai	เชียงใหม่	North
Mae Tuen	แม่ตื่น	Mae Ramat	แม่ระมาด	Tak	ตาก	West
Mae U-su	แม่อุสุ	Tha Song Yang	ท่าสองยาง	Tak	ตาก	West
Mae Ukho	แม่อูคอ	Khun Yuam	ขุนยวม	Mae Hong Son	แม่ฮ่องสอน	North
Mae Wa Luang	แม่วะหลวง	Tha Song Yang	ท่าสองยาง	Tak	ตาก	West
Mae Waen	แม่แวน	Phrao	พร้าว	Chiang Mai	เชียงใหม่	North
Mae Wah	แม่วะ	Thoen	เถิน	Lampang	ลำปาง	North
Mae Wat	แม่หวาด	Than To	ธารโต	Yala	ยะลา	South
Mae Win	แม่วิน	Mae Wang	แม่วาง	Chiang Mai	เชียงใหม่	North
Mae Wong	แม่วงก์	Mae Wong	แม่วงก์	Nakhon Sawan	นครสวรรค์	Central
Mae Yang Ho	แม่ยางฮ่อ	Rong Kwang	ร้องกวาง	Phrae	แพร่	North
Mae Yang Rong	แม่ยางร้อง	Rong Kwang	ร้องกวาง	Phrae	แพร่	North
Mae Yang Tan	แม่ยางตาล	Rong Kwang	ร้องกวาง	Phrae	แพร่	North
Mae Yao	แม่ยาว	Mueang Chiang Rai	เมืองเชียงราย	Chiang Rai	เชียงราย	North
Mae Yen	แม่เย็น	Phan	พาน	Chiang Rai	เชียงราย	North
Mae Yom	แม่ยม	Mueang Phrae	เมืองแพร่	Phrae	แพร่	North
Mae Yuam	แม่ยวม	Mae Sariang	แม่สะเรียง	Mae Hong Son	แม่ฮ่องสอน	North
Mae Yuam Noi	แม่ยวมน้อย	Khun Yuam	ขุนยวม	Mae Hong Son	แม่ฮ่องสอน	North
Maenam Khu	แม่น้ำคู้	Pluak Daeng	ปลวกแดง	Rayong	ระยอง	East
Maet	แมด	Lue Amnat	ลืออำนาจ	Amnat Charoen	อำนาจเจริญ	Northeast
Maet Na Thom	แมดนาท่ม	Khok Si Suphan	โคกศรีสุพรรณ	Sakon Nakhon	สกลนคร	Northeast
Mafueang	มะเฟือง	Phutthaisong	พุทไธสง	Buriram	บุรีรัมย์	Northeast
Maha Chai	มหาชัย	Mueang Samut Sakhon	เมืองสมุทรสาคร	Samut Sakhon	สมุทรสาคร	Central
Maha Chai	มหาชัย	Sai Ngam	ไทรงาม	Kamphaeng Phet	กำแพงเพชร	Central
Maha Chai	มหาชัย	Pla Pak	ปลาปาก	Nakhon Phanom	นครพนม	Northeast
Maha Chai	มหาไชย	Somdet	สมเด็จ	Kalasin	กาฬสินธุ์	Northeast
Maha Phot	มหาโพธิ	Kao Liao	เก้าเลี้ยว	Nakhon Sawan	นครสวรรค์	Central
Maha Phot	มหาโพธิ	Sa Bot	สระโบสถ์	Lopburi	ลพบุรี	Central
Maha Phram	มหาพราหมณ์	Bang Ban	บางบาล	Phra Nakhon Si Ayutthaya	พระนครศรีอยุธยา	Central
Maha Phruettharam	มหาพฤฒาราม	Khet Bang Rak	บางรัก	Bangkok	กรุงเทพมหานคร	Central
Maha Sawat	มหาสวัสดิ์	Phutthamonthon	พุทธมณฑล	Nakhon Pathom	นครปฐม	Central
Maha Sawat	มหาสวัสดิ์	Bang Kruai	บางกรวย	Nonthaburi	นนทบุรี	Central
Maha Son	มหาสอน	Ban Mi	บ้านหมี่	Lopburi	ลพบุรี	Central
Maha Rat	มหาราช	Maha Rat	มหาราช	Phra Nakhon Si Ayutthaya	พระนครศรีอยุธยา	Central
Mahat Thai	มหาดไทย	Mueang Ang Thong	เมืองอ่างทอง	Ang Thong	อ่างทอง	Central
Mahawan	มหาวัน	Mae Sot	แม่สอด	Tak	ตาก	West
Mai	มาย	Ban Muang	บ้านม่วง	Sakon Nakhon	สกลนคร	Northeast
Mai	ใหม่	Non Sung	โนนสูง	Nakhon Ratchasima	นครราชสีมา	Northeast
Mai Dat	ไม้ดัด	Bang Rachan	บางระจัน	Sing Buri	สิงห์บุรี	Central
Mai Fat	ไม้ฝาด	Sikao	สิเกา	Trang	ตรัง	South
Mai Kaen	ไม้แก่น	Mai Kaen	ไม้แก่น	Pattani	ปัตตานี	South
Mai Khao	ไม้ขาว	Thalang	ถลาง	Phuket	ภูเก็ต	South
Mai Khet	ไม้เค็ด	Mueang Prachinburi	เมืองปราจีนบุรี	Prachin Buri	ปราจีนบุรี	East
Mai Klon	ไม้กลอน	Phana	พนา	Amnat Charoen	อำนาจเจริญ	Northeast
Mai Na Phiang	ใหม่นาเพียง	Waeng Yai	แวงใหญ่	Khon Kaen	ขอนแก่น	Northeast
Mai Ngam	ไม้งาม	Mueang Tak	เมืองตาก	Tak	ตาก	West
Mai Phatthana	ใหม่พัฒนา	Ko Kha	เกาะคา	Lampang	ลำปาง	North
Mai Riang	ไม้เรียง	Chawang	ฉวาง	Nakhon Si Thammarat	นครศรีธรรมราช	South
Mai Rut	ไม้รูด	Khlong Yai	คลองใหญ่	Trat	ตราด	East
Mai Tra	ไม้ตรา	Bang Sai	บางไทร	Phra Nakhon Si Ayutthaya	พระนครศรีอยุธยา	Central
Mai Ya	ไม้ยา	Phaya Mengrai	พญาเม็งราย	Chiang Rai	เชียงราย	North
Mak Khaeng	หมากแข้ง	Mueang Udon Thani	เมืองอุดรธานี	Udon Thani	อุดรธานี	Northeast
Mak Khiap	หมากเขียบ	Mueang Sisaket	เมืองศรีสะเกษ	Sisaket	ศรีสะเกษ	Northeast
Mak Ya	หมากหญ้า	Nong Wua So	หนองวัวซอ	Udon Thani	อุดรธานี	Northeast
Makha	มะค่า	Non Thai	โนนไทย	Nakhon Ratchasima	นครราชสีมา	Northeast
Makha	มะค่า	Kantharawichai	กันทรวิชัย	Maha Sarakham	มหาสารคาม	Northeast
Makha	มะค่า	Non Sung	โนนสูง	Nakhon Ratchasima	นครราชสีมา	Northeast
Makham	มะขาม	Makham	มะขาม	Chanthaburi	จันทบุรี	East
Makham Khu	มะขามคู่	Nikhom Phatthana	นิคมพัฒนา	Rayong	ระยอง	East
Makham Lom	มะขามล้ม	Bang Pla Ma	บางปลาม้า	Suphan Buri	สุพรรณบุรี	Central
Makham Luang	มะขามหลวง	San Pa Tong	สันป่าตอง	Chiang Mai	เชียงใหม่	North
Makham Sung	มะขามสูง	Mueang Phitsanulok	เมืองพิษณุโลก	Phitsanulok	พิษณุโลก	Central
Makham Thao	มะขามเฒ่า	Wat Sing	วัดสิงห์	Chai Nat	ชัยนาท	Central
Makham Tia	มะขามเตี้ย	Mueang Surat Thani	เมืองสุราษฎร์ธานี	Surat Thani	สุราษฎร์ธานี	South
Makham Yong	มะขามหย่ง	Mueang Chonburi	เมืองชลบุรี	Chonburi	ชลบุรี	East
Makhuea Chae	มะเขือแจ้	Mueang Lamphun	เมืองลำพูน	Lamphun	ลำพูน	North
Makhun Wan	มะขุนหวาน	San Pa Tong	สันป่าตอง	Chiang Mai	เชียงใหม่	North
Makkasan	มักกะสัน	Khet Ratchathewi	ราชเทวี	Bangkok	กรุงเทพมหานคร	Central
Makluea Kao	มะเกลือเก่า	Sung Noen	สูงเนิน	Nakhon Ratchasima	นครราชสีมา	Northeast
Makluea Mai	มะเกลือใหม่	Sung Noen	สูงเนิน	Nakhon Ratchasima	นครราชสีมา	Northeast
Makok	มะกอก	Pa Sang	ป่าซาง	Lamphun	ลำพูน	North
Makok Nuea	มะกอกเหนือ	Khuan Khanun	ควนขนุน	Phatthalung	พัทลุง	South
Makok Wan	มะกอกหวาน	Chai Badan	ชัยบาดาล	Lopburi	ลพบุรี	Central
Makrut	มะกรูด	Khok Pho	โคกโพธิ์	Pattani	ปัตตานี	South
Malika	มะลิกา	Mae Ai	แม่อาย	Chiang Mai	เชียงใหม่	North
Maluan	มะลวน	Phunphin	พุนพิน	Surat Thani	สุราษฎร์ธานี	South
Mamong	มาโมง	Sukhirin	สุคิริน	Narathiwat	นราธิวาส	South
Mamu	มะมุ	Kra Buri	กระบุรี	Ranong	ระนอง	South
Mamuang Song Ton	มะม่วงสองต้น	Mueang Nakhon Si Thammarat	นครศรีธรรมราช	Nakhon Si Thammarat	นครศรีธรรมราช	South
Manang Dalam	มะนังดาลำ	Sai Buri (Malay: Telube or Selindung Bayu)	สายบุรี	Pattani	ปัตตานี	South
Manang Tayo	มะนังตายอ	Mueang Narathiwat	เมืองนราธิวาส	Narathiwat	นราธิวาส	South
Manang Yong	มะนังยง	Yaring (Malay: Jamu)	ยะหริ่ง	Pattani	ปัตตานี	South
Manao Wan	มะนาวหวาน	Phatthana Nikhom	พัฒนานิคม	Lopburi	ลพบุรี	Central
Manwichai	มารวิชัย	Sena	เสนา	Phra Nakhon Si Ayutthaya	พระนครศรีอยุธยา	Central
Map Kae	มาบแก	Lat Yao	ลาดยาว	Nakhon Sawan	นครสวรรค์	Central
Map Kha	มาบข่า	Nikhom Phatthana	นิคมพัฒนา	Rayong	ระยอง	East
Map Khae	มาบแค	Mueang Nakhon Pathom	เมืองนครปฐม	Nakhon Phanom	นครพนม	Northeast
Map Krat	มาบกราด	Phra Thong Kham	พระทองคำ	Nakhon Ratchasima	นครราชสีมา	Northeast
Map Phai	มาบไผ่	Ban Bueng	บ้านบึง	Chonburi	ชลบุรี	East
Map Phai	มาบไพ	Khlung	ขลุง	Chanthaburi	จันทบุรี	East
Map Pla Khao	มาบปลาเค้า	Tha Yang	ท่ายาง	Phetchaburi	เพชรบุรี	West
Map Pong	มาบโป่ง	Phan Thong	พานทอง	Chonburi	ชลบุรี	East
Map Ta Phut	มาบตาพุด	Mueang Rayong	เมืองระยอง	Rayong	ระยอง	East
Map Tako En	มาบตะโกเอน	Khon Buri	ครบุรี	Nakhon Ratchasima	นครราชสีมา	Northeast
Map Yang Phon	มาบยางพร	Pluak Daeng	ปลวกแดง	Rayong	ระยอง	East
Maret	มะเร็ต	Ko Samui	เกาะสมุย	Surat Thani	สุราษฎร์ธานี	South
Maroeng	มะเริง	Mueang Nakhon Ratchasima	เมืองนครราชสีมา	Nakhon Ratchasima	นครราชสีมา	Northeast
Maruebo Tok	มะรือโบตก	Ra-ngae	ระแงะ	Narathiwat	นราธิวาส	South
Maruebo Ok	มะรือโบออก	Cho-airong	เจาะไอร้อง	Narathiwat	นราธิวาส	South
Marui	มะรุ่ย	Thap Put	ทับปุด	Phang Nga	พังงา	South
Mathong	มะต้อง	Phrom Phiram	พรหมพิราม	Phitsanulok	พิษณุโลก	Central
Mathum	มะตูม	Phrom Phiram	พรหมพิราม	Phitsanulok	พิษณุโลก	Central
Mayo	มายอ	Mayo	มายอ	Pattani	ปัตตานี	South
Mek Dam	เม็กดำ	Phayakkhaphum Phisai	พยัคฆภูมิพิสัย	Maha Sarakham	มหาสารคาม	Northeast
Mengrai	เม็งราย	Phaya Mengrai	พญาเม็งราย	Chiang Rai	เชียงราย	North
Mi Chai	มีชัย	Mueang Nong Khai	เมืองหนองคาย	Nong Khai	หนองคาย	Northeast
Min Buri	มีนบุรี	Khet Min Buri	มีนบุรี	Bangkok	กรุงเทพมหานคร	Central
Mittraphap	มิตรภาพ	Muak Lek	มวกเหล็ก	Saraburi	สระบุรี	Central
Mittraphap	มิตรภาพ	Kae Dam	แกดำ	Maha Sarakham	มหาสารคาม	Northeast
Mittraphap	มิตรภาพ	Sikhio	สีคิ้ว	Nakhon Ratchasima	นครราชสีมา	Northeast
Mo	เหมาะ	Kapong	กะปง	Phang Nga	พังงา	South
Mo Mawi	เมาะมาวี	Yarang	ยะรัง	Pattani	ปัตตานี	South
Mo Thai	โมถ่าย	Chaiya	ไชยา	Surat Thani	สุราษฎร์ธานี	South
Moei Wadi	เมยวดี	Moei Wadi	เมยวดี	Roi Et	ร้อยเอ็ด	Northeast
Mok Champae	หมอกจำแป่	Mueang Mae Hong Son	เมืองแม่ฮ่องสอน	Mae Hong Son	แม่ฮ่องสอน	North
Mok Thaeo	หมกแถว	Nong Khayang	หนองขาหย่าง	Uthai Thani	อุทัยธานี	Central
Mokhlan	โมคลาน	Tha Sala	ท่าศาลา	Nakhon Si Thammarat	นครศรีธรรมราช	South
Mokro	โมโกร	Umphang	อุ้มผาง	Tak	ตาก	West
Mon Chong	ม่อนจอง	Omkoi	อมก๋อย	Chiang Mai	เชียงใหม่	North
Mon Nang	หมอนนาง	Phanat Nikhom	พนัสนิคม	Chonburi	ชลบุรี	East
Mon Pin	ม่อนปิ่น	Fang	ฝาง	Chiang Mai	เชียงใหม่	North
Mon Thong	หมอนทอง	Bang Nam Priao	บางน้ำเปรี้ยว	Chachoengsao	ฉะเชิงเทรา	East
Mongkhon Tham Nimit	มงคลธรรมนิมิต	Samko	สามโก้	Ang Thong	อ่างทอง	Central
Mot Daeng	มดแดง	Si Prachan	ศรีประจันต์	Suphan Buri	สุพรรณบุรี	Central
Mu Mon	หมูม้น	Chiang Khwan	เชียงขวัญ	Roi Et	ร้อยเอ็ด	Northeast
Mu Mon	หมูม่น	Somdet	สมเด็จ	Kalasin	กาฬสินธุ์	Northeast
Mu Mon	หมูม่น	Mueang Udon Thani	เมืองอุดรธานี	Udon Thani	อุดรธานี	Northeast
Mu Si	หมูสี	Pak Chong	ปากช่อง	Nakhon Ratchasima	นครราชสีมา	Northeast
Muak Lek	มวกเหล็ก	Muak Lek	มวกเหล็ก	Saraburi	สระบุรี	Central
Muang	ม่วง	Ban Muang	บ้านม่วง	Sakon Nakhon	สกลนคร	Northeast
Muang Chet Ton	ม่วงเจ็ดต้น	Ban Khok	บ้านโคก	Uttaradit	อุตรดิตถ์	North
Muang Chum	ม่วงชุม	Tha Muang	ท่าม่วง	Kanchanaburi	กาญจนบุรี	West
Muang Hak	ม่วงหัก	Phayuha Khiri	พยุหะคีรี	Nakhon Sawan	นครสวรรค์	Central
Muang Khai	ม่วงไข่	Phang Khon	พังโคน	Sakon Nakhon	สกลนคร	Northeast
Muang Kham	ม่วงคำ	Phan	พาน	Chiang Rai	เชียงราย	North
Muang Khom	ม่วงค่อม	Chai Badan	ชัยบาดาล	Lopburi	ลพบุรี	Central
Muang Kluang	ม่วงกลวง	Kapoe	กะเปอร์	Ranong	ระนอง	South
Muang Lai	ม่วงลาย	Mueang Sakon Nakhon	เมืองสกลนคร	Sakon Nakhon	สกลนคร	Northeast
Muang Lat	ม่วงลาด	Changhan	จังหาร	Roi Et	ร้อยเอ็ด	Northeast
Muang Mu	ม่วงหมู่	Mueang Sing Buri	เมืองสิงห์บุรี	Sing Buri	สิงห์บุรี	Central
Muang Na	ม่วงนา	Don Chan	ดอนจาน	Kalasin	กาฬสินธุ์	Northeast
Muang Ngam	ม่วงงาม	Singhanakhon	สิงหนคร	Songkhla	สงขลา	South
Muang Ngam	ม่วงงาม	Sao Hai	เสาไห้	Saraburi	สระบุรี	Central
Muang Noi	ม่วงน้อย	Pa Sang	ป่าซาง	Lamphun	ลำพูน	North
Muang Sam Sip	ม่วงสามสิบ	Muang Sam Sip	ม่วงสามสิบ	Ubon Ratchathani	อุบลราชธานี	Northeast
Muang Tia	ม่วงเตี้ย	Wiset Chai Chan	วิเศษชัยชาญ	Ang Thong	อ่างทอง	Central
Muang Tia	ม่วงเตี้ย	Mae Lan	แม่ลาน	Pattani	ปัตตานี	South
Muang Tuet	ม่วงตึ๊ด	Phu Phiang	ภูเพียง	Nan	น่าน	North
Muang Wan	ม่วงหวาน	Nam Phong	น้ำพอง	Khon Kaen	ขอนแก่น	Northeast
Muang Wan	ม่วงหวาน	Nong Saeng	หนองแซง	Saraburi	สระบุรี	Central
Muang Yai	ม่วงยาย	Wiang Kaen	เวียงแก่น	Chiang Rai	เชียงราย	North
Muang Yai	ม่วงใหญ่	Pho Sai	โพธิ์ไทร	Ubon Ratchathani	อุบลราชธานี	Northeast
Mueang	เมือง	Mueang Loei	เมืองเลย	Loei	เลย	Northeast
Mueang	เมือง	Kantharalak	กันทรลักษ์	Sisaket	ศรีสะเกษ	Northeast
Mueang	เหมือง	Mueang Chonburi	เมืองชลบุรี	Chonburi	ชลบุรี	East
Mueang Bang Khlang	เมืองบางขลัง	Sawankhalok	สวรรคโลก	Sukhothai	สุโขทัย	Central
Mueang Bang Yom	เมืองบางยม	Sawankhalok	สวรรคโลก	Sukhothai	สุโขทัย	Central
Mueang Bua	เมืองบัว	Kaset Wisai	เกษตรวิสัย	Roi Et	ร้อยเอ็ด	Northeast
Mueang Bua	เมืองบัว	Chumphon Buri	ชุมพลบุรี	Surin	สุรินทร์	Northeast
Mueang Chang	เมืองจัง	Phu Phiang	ภูเพียง	Nan	น่าน	North
Mueang Chi	เหมืองจี้	Mueang Lamphun	เมืองลำพูน	Lamphun	ลำพูน	North
Mueang Chum	เมืองชุม	Wiang Chai	เวียงชัย	Chiang Rai	เชียงราย	North
Mueang Det	เมืองเดช	Det Udom	เดชอุดม	Ubon Ratchathani	อุบลราชธานี	Northeast
Mueang Don	เมืองโดน	Prathai	ประทาย	Nakhon Ratchasima	นครราชสีมา	Northeast
Mueang Faek	เมืองแฝก	Lam Plai Mat	ลำปลายมาศ	Buriram	บุรีรัมย์	Northeast
Mueang Fai	เมืองฝ้าย	Nong Hong	หนองหงส์	Buriram	บุรีรัมย์	Northeast
Mueang Fang	เมืองฝาง	Mueang Buriram	เมืองบุรีรัมย์	Buriram	บุรีรัมย์	Northeast
Mueang Haeng	เมืองแหง	Wiang Haeng	เวียงแหง	Chiang Mai	เชียงใหม่	North
Mueang Hong	เมืองหงส์	Chaturaphak Phiman	จตุรพักตรพิมาน	Roi Et	ร้อยเอ็ด	Northeast
Mueang Ka Rung	เมืองการุ้ง	Ban Rai	บ้านไร่	Uthai Thani	อุทัยธานี	Central
Mueang Kae	เมืองแก	Satuek	สตึก	Buriram	บุรีรัมย์	Northeast
Mueang Kae	เมืองแก	Tha Tum	ท่าตูม	Surin	สุรินทร์	Northeast
Mueang Kaeo	เหมืองแก้ว	Mae Rim	แม่ริม	Chiang Mai	เชียงใหม่	North
Mueang Kai	เมืองก๋าย	Mae Taeng	แม่แตง	Chiang Mai	เชียงใหม่	North
Mueang Kao	เมืองเก่า	Sao Hai	เสาไห้	Saraburi	สระบุรี	Central
Mueang Kao	เมืองเก่า	Kabin Buri	กบินทร์บุรี	Prachin Buri	ปราจีนบุรี	East
Mueang Kao	เมืองเก่า	Mueang Sukhothai	เมืองสุโขทัย	Sukhothai	สุโขทัย	Central
Mueang Kao	เมืองเก่า	Phanom Sarakham	พนมสารคาม	Chachoengsao	ฉะเชิงเทรา	East
Mueang Kao	เมืองเก่า	Mueang Khon Kaen	เมืองขอนแก่น	Khon Kaen	ขอนแก่น	Northeast
Mueang Kao	เมืองเก่า	Mueang Phichit	อุทัยธานี	Phichit	พิจิตร	Central
Mueang Kao Phatthana	เมืองเก่าพัฒนา	Wiang Kao	เวียงเก่า	Khon Kaen	ขอนแก่น	Northeast
Mueang Kaset	เมืองเกษตร	Kham Sakaesaeng	ขามสะแกแสง	Nakhon Ratchasima	นครราชสีมา	Northeast
Mueang Khaen	เมืองแคน	Rasi Salai	ราษีไศล	Sisaket	ศรีสะเกษ	Northeast
Mueang Khong	เมืองคง	Chiang Dao	เชียงดาว	Chiang Mai	เชียงใหม่	North
Mueang Khong	เมืองคง	Khong	คง	Nakhon Ratchasima	นครราชสีมา	Northeast
Mueang Khong	เมืองคง	Rasi Salai	ราษีไศล	Sisaket	ศรีสะเกษ	Northeast
Mueang Len	เมืองเล็น	San Sai	สันทราย	Chiang Mai	เชียงใหม่	North
Mueang Ling	เมืองลีง	Chom Phra	จอมพระ	Surin	สุรินทร์	Northeast
Mueang Luang	เมืองหลวง	Huai Thap Than	ห้วยทับทัน	Sisaket	ศรีสะเกษ	Northeast
Mueang Mai	เมืองมาย	Chae Hom	แจ้ห่ม	Lampang	ลำปาง	North
Mueang Mai	เมืองใหม่	Si Bun Rueang	ศรีบุญเรือง	Nong Bua Lamphu	หนองบัวลำภู	Northeast
Mueang Mai	เมืองใหม่	Ratchasan	ราชสาส์น	Chachoengsao	ฉะเชิงเทรา	East
Mueang Mai	เหมืองใหม่	Amphawa	อัมพวา	Samut Songkhram	สมุทรสงคราม	Central
Mueang Mi	เมืองหมี	Mueang Nong Khai	เมืองหนองคาย	Nong Khai	หนองคาย	Northeast
Mueang Mo	เหมืองหม้อ	Mueang Phrae	เมืองแพร่	Phrae	แพร่	North
Mueang Na	เมืองนะ	Chiang Dao	เชียงดาว	Chiang Mai	เชียงใหม่	North
Mueang Nat	เมืองนาท	Kham Sakaesaeng	ขามสะแกแสง	Nakhon Ratchasima	นครราชสีมา	Northeast
Mueang Nga	เหมืองง่า	Mueang Lamphun	เมืองลำพูน	Lamphun	ลำพูน	North
Mueang Ngai	เมืองงาย	Chiang Dao	เชียงดาว	Chiang Mai	เชียงใหม่	North
Mueang Noi	เมืองน้อย	Thawat Buri	ธวัชบุรี	Roi Et	ร้อยเอ็ด	Northeast
Mueang Noi	เมืองน้อย	Kanthararom	กันทรารมย์	Sisaket	ศรีสะเกษ	Northeast
Mueang Nuea	เมืองเหนือ	Mueang Sisaket	เมืองศรีสะเกษ	Sisaket	ศรีสะเกษ	Northeast
Mueang Paeng	เมืองแปง	Pai	ปาย	Mae Hong Son	แม่ฮ่องสอน	North
Mueang Pak	เมืองปัก	Pak Thong Chai	ปักธงชัย	Nakhon Ratchasima	นครราชสีมา	Northeast
Mueang Pan	เมืองปาน	Mueang Pan	เมืองปาน	Lampang	ลำปาง	North
Mueang Phai	เมืองไผ่	Aranyaprathet	อรัญประเทศ	Sa Kaeo	สระแก้ว	East
Mueang Phai	เมืองไผ่	Nong Ki	หนองกี่	Buriram	บุรีรัมย์	Northeast
Mueang Phai	เมืองไผ่	Krasang	กระสัง	Buriram	บุรีรัมย์	Northeast
Mueang Phalai	เมืองพะไล	Bua Lai	บัวลาย	Nakhon Ratchasima	นครราชสีมา	Northeast
Mueang Phan	เมืองพาน	Phan	พาน	Chiang Rai	เชียงราย	North
Mueang Phan	เมืองพาน	Ban Phue	บ้านผือ	Udon Thani	อุดรธานี	Northeast
Mueang Phia	เมืองเพีย	Ban Phai	บ้านไผ่	Khon Kaen	ขอนแก่น	Northeast
Mueang Phia	เมืองเพีย	Kut Chap	กุดจับ	Udon Thani	อุดรธานี	Northeast
Mueang Phlapphla	เมืองพลับพลา	Huai Thalaeng	ห้วยแถลง	Nakhon Ratchasima	นครราชสีมา	Northeast
Mueang Pho	เมืองโพธิ์	Huai Rat	ห้วยราช	Buriram	บุรีรัมย์	Northeast
Mueang Phon	เมืองพล	Phon	พล	Khon Kaen	ขอนแก่น	Northeast
Mueang Phrai	เมืองไพร	Selaphum	เสลภูมิ	Roi Et	ร้อยเอ็ด	Northeast
Mueang Plueai	เมืองเปลือย	Si Somdet	ศรีสมเด็จ	Roi Et	ร้อยเอ็ด	Northeast
Mueang Pon	เมืองปอน	Khun Yuam	ขุนยวม	Mae Hong Son	แม่ฮ่องสอน	North
Mueang Prasat	เมืองปราสาท	Non Sung	โนนสูง	Nakhon Ratchasima	นครราชสีมา	Northeast
Mueang Sawankhalok	เมืองสวรรคโลก	Sawankhalok	สวรรคโลก	Sukhothai	สุโขทัย	Central
Mueang Si Khai	เมืองศรีไค	Warin Chamrap	วารินชำราบ	Ubon Ratchathani	อุบลราชธานี	Northeast
Mueang Suang	เมืองสรวง	Mueang Suang	เมืองสรวง	Roi Et	ร้อยเอ็ด	Northeast
Mueang Suea	เมืองเสือ	Phayakkhaphum Phisai	พยัคฆภูมิพิสัย	Maha Sarakham	มหาสารคาม	Northeast
Mueang Tai	เมืองใต้	Mueang Sisaket	เมืองศรีสะเกษ	Sisaket	ศรีสะเกษ	Northeast
Mueang Tao	เมืองเตา	Phayakkhaphum Phisai	พยัคฆภูมิพิสัย	Maha Sarakham	มหาสารคาม	Northeast
Mueang Thi	เมืองที	Mueang Surin	เมืองสุรินทร์	Surin	สุรินทร์	Northeast
Mueang Thong	เมืองทอง	Mueang Roi Et	เมืองร้อยเอ็ด	Roi Et	ร้อยเอ็ด	Northeast
Mueang Thung	เมืองทุ่ง	Suwannaphum	สุวรรณภูมิ	Roi Et	ร้อยเอ็ด	Northeast
Mueang Yang	เมืองยาง	Mueang Yang	เมืองยาง	Nakhon Ratchasima	นครราชสีมา	Northeast
Mueang Yang	เมืองยาง	Chamni	ชำนิ	Buriram	บุรีรัมย์	Northeast
Mueang Yao	เมืองยาว	Hang Chat	ห้างฉัตร	Lampang	ลำปาง	North
Muen Si	หมื่นศรี	Samrong Thap	สำโรงทาบ	Surin	สุรินทร์	Northeast
Muen Wai	หมื่นไวย	Mueang Nakhon Ratchasima	เมืองนครราชสีมา	Nakhon Ratchasima	นครราชสีมา	Northeast
Muet Ka	มืดกา	Doi Tao	ดอยเต่า	Chiang Mai	เชียงใหม่	North
Mukdahan	มุกดาหาร	Mueang Mukdahan	เมืองมุกดาหาร	Mukdahan	มุกดาหาร	Northeast
Muno	มูโนะ	Su-ngai Kolok (Malay: Sungai Golok)	สุไหงโก-ลก	Narathiwat	นราธิวาส	South
Mutchalin	มุจลินท์	Tha Wung	ท่าวุ้ง	Lopburi	ลพบุรี	Central

== See also ==
- Organization of the government of Thailand
- List of districts of Thailand
- List of districts of Bangkok
- List of tambon in Thailand
- Provinces of Thailand
- List of municipalities in Thailand
