= Omkoi =

Omkoi may refer to:

- Omkoi district
- Omkoi subdistrict
