= Doi Tao =

Doi Tao may refer to:

- Doi Tao District
- Doi Tao Subdistrict
