= Mengrai =

Mengrai may refer to:

- Mangrai (the Great), 13th-century king of Lanna
- Mengrai Subdistrict in Phaya Mengrai District, Chiang Rai Province, Thailand
