= Si Thoi =

Si Thoi may refer to several places in Thailand:

- Si Thoi, Chiang Rai
- Si Thoi, Phayao
