= Mae Suai =

Mae Suai may refer to:

- Mae Suai District
- Mae Suai Subdistrict
