= Muang Kham =

Muang Kham may refer to:

- Muang Kham, Laos
- Muang Kham, Chiang Rai, Thailand
