= Mae Tuen =

Mae Tuen may refer to:

- Mae Tuen, Chiang Mai
- Mae Tuen, Lamphun
