= Mae Tam =

Mae Tam may refer to several places in Thailand:

- Mae Tam, Chiang Rai
- Mae Tam, Phayao
