= Mae Long =

Mae Long แม่หลอง
- Tambon
- Interactive map of Mae Long
- Coordinates: 17°41′36″N 98°14′27″E
- Country: Thailand
- Province: Chiang Mai
- District: Omkoi

Population (2017)
  - Total: 8,065
- Time zone: UTC+7 (ICT)
- Postal code: 50310
- TIS 1099: 501805

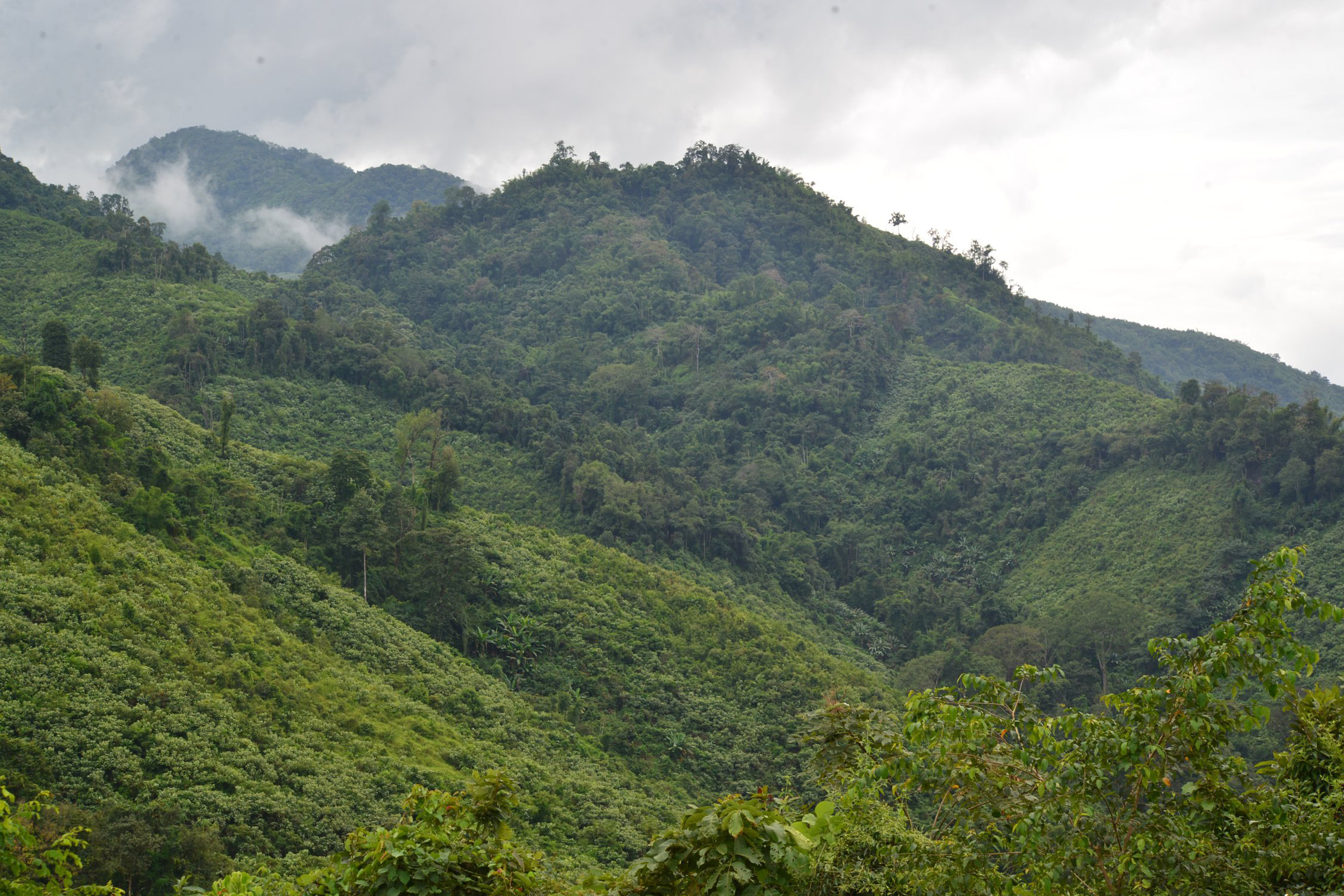

Mae Long (Thai: แม่หลอง) is a tambon (subdistrict) of Omkoi District, in Chiang Mai Province, Thailand. In 2017 it had a population of 8,065 people.

== Geography ==
Mae Ngao National Park is in this subdistrict.

== History ==
The subdistrict was created effective 10 August 1989 by splitting off 10 administrative villages from Yang Piang. In 2022, it was renamed from Sop Khong to Mae Long.

== Administration ==
=== Central administration ===
The tambon is divided into 12 administrative villages (mubans).

No.	Name	Thai
1.	Ban Mae Long Tai	บ้านแม่หลองใต้
2.	Ban Mae Long Noi	บ้านแม่หลองน้อย
3.	Ban Mae Long Luang	บ้านแม่หลองหลวง
4.	Ban Khun Tuen	บ้านขุนตื่น
5.	Ban Khun Om Haet	บ้านขุนอมแฮด
6.	Ban U-chae	บ้านอูแจะ
7.	Ban Huai Yao	บ้านห้วยยาว
8.	Ban Tako Kha	บ้านตะกอคะ
9.	Ban Mae Ngao	บ้านแม่เงา
10.	Ban O Lo Di	บ้านโอโลคี
11.	Ban Pha Biao	บ้านพะเบี้ยว
12.	Ban Huai Nam Phueng	บ้านห้วยน้ำผึ้ง

=== Local administration ===
The area of the subdistrict is covered by the subdistrict administrative organization (SAO) Sop Khong (องค์การบริหารส่วนตำบลสบโขง).
