= Pa Pong =

Pa Pong may refer to:

- Pa Pong, Chiang Mai, Thailand
- Pa Pong, Mae Hong Son, Thailand
