= Charoen Rat =

Charoen Rat เจริญราษฎร์
- Tambon
- Interactive map of Charoen Rat
- Coordinates: 19°23′25″N 99°46′42″E
- Country: Thailand
- Province: Phayao
- Amphoe: Mae Chai

Population (2020)
  - Total: 3,807
- Time zone: UTC+7 (TST)
- Postal code: 56130
- TIS 1099: 560706

Charoen Rat (Thai: เจริญราษฎร์, pronounced [t͡ɕā.rɤ̄ːn râːt]) is a tambon (subdistrict) of Mae Chai District, in Phayao Province, Thailand. In 2020, it had a total population of 3,807 people.

The subdistrict is in the northwestern part of the province not far from the border with Chiang Rai Province. It lies along the National Road 1 (Phahon Yothin Road) and is connected by road to Pa Faek in the north and Mae Chai and Phayao in the south.

== History ==
The subdistrict was created effective August 1, 1988 by splitting off 8 administrative villages from Pa Faek.

== Administration ==
=== Central administration ===
The tambon is subdivided into 8 administrative villages (muban).

No.	Name	Thai
1.	Ban Pa Miang	บ้านป่าเมี้ยง
2.	Ban Phichit Phatthana	บ้านพิจิตรพัฒนา
3.	Ban Ton Phueng	บ้านต้นผึ้ง
4.	Ban Huai Charoen Rat	บ้านห้วยเจริญราษฎร์
5.	Ban San Ton Muang	บ้านสันต้นม่วง
6.	Ban San Muang Mai	บ้านสันม่วงใหม่
7.	Ban San Sali	บ้านสันสลี
8.	Ban San Don Kaeo	บ้านสันดอนแก้ว

=== Local administration ===
The whole area of the subdistrict is covered by the subdistrict municipality (Thesaban Tambon) Charoen Rat (เทศบาลตำบลเจริญราษฎร์).
