= Chaem Luang =

Chaem Luang แจ่มหลวง
- Tambon
- Interactive map of Chaem Luang
- Country: Thailand
- Province: Chiang Mai
- District: Galyani Vadhana

Population (2015)
  - Total: 3,748
- Time zone: UTC+7 (ICT)
- Postal code: 58130
- TIS 1099: 502503

Chaem Luang (Thai: แจ่มหลวง) is a tambon (subdistrict) of Galyani Vadhana District, in Chiang Mai Province, Thailand. In 2015 it had a population of 3,748 people.

== History ==
The subdistrict was created effective 16 November 1995 by splitting off seven administrative villages from Ban Chan.

== Administration ==
=== Central administration ===
The tambon is divided into seven administrative villages (mubans).

No.	Name	Thai
1.	Ban Khun Mae Ruam	บ้านขุนแม่รวม
2.	Ban Kio Pong	บ้านกิ่วโป่ง
3.	Ban Mae La-up	บ้านแม่ละอุป
4.	Ban Huai Ya	บ้านห้วยยา
5.	Ban Huai Khiat Haeng	บ้านห้วยเขียดแห้ง
6.	Ban Chaem Luang	บ้านแจ่มหลวง
7.	Ban Sao Daeng	บ้านเสาแดง

=== Local administration ===
The area of the subdistrict is covered by the subdistrict administrative organization (SAO) Chaem Luang (องค์การบริหารส่วนตำบลแจ่มหลวง).
