= Ban Chan =

Ban Chan may refer to:

- Ban Chan, Chiang Mai (Thai: บ้านจันทร์), a subdistrict (tambon) in Galyani Vadhana District, Chiang Mai, Thailand
- Ban Chan Subdistrict (Thai: บ้านจันทน์) in Ban Dung District, Udon Thani, Thailand

== See also ==
- Banchan, side dishes served along with cooked rice in Korean cuisine
