= Khun Yuam Airfield =

- IATA: none; ICAO: VTCK

Summary
- Airport type: Defunct
- Location: Khun Yuam, Mae Hong Son province, northern Thailand
- Opened: 1940-41
- Time zone: (UTC+7)
- Elevation AMSL: 4,304 ft / 1,312 m
- Coordinates: 18°49′35″N 97°55′53″E
- Interactive map of Khun Yuam Airfield

Runways
Direction	Length		Surface
Direction	ft	m	Surface
02/20	3,543.3	1,080	Laterite

Khun Yuam Airfield (ICAO: VTCK) is an abandoned World War II airfield in Khun Yuam, Mae Hong Son province, northern Thailand. It operated mainly as an emergency landing ground throughout the war.

== History ==
Khun Yuam Airfield was constructed between late 1940 and mid-1941. It was first observed by the US government in June 1942 as a Type “E” airfield, designating it for emergency usage. It may have been used by the Japanese to forward transport and supplies. Beginning in late 1943 and onward, Allied intelligence began tracking the airfield as an emergency landing ground, though often unserviceable. It served a utilitarian function, occasionally used for Thai airmail services, with 3 flights/month between Mae Hong Son and Mae Sariang. On 20 March 1945, a commercial Thai mail plane was attacked by an American North American P-51 Mustang, crashing in Mae Surin, located about 9 km north of Khun Tuam. On April, 1945, Khun Yuam Airfield was reported with a single rolled earth runway, capable of dry weather operations.

=== Post-war Usage ===
After the war, the remaining Japanese army were ordered to deploy to Khum Yuam, where they were employed in repairing Khun Yuam Airfield to facilitate surrender operations. However, the British history book volume 5 of The War Against Japan, had mistakenly claimed that Khun Yuam Airfield was rather built after the war by surrendering Japanese. According to several interviews with locals, after being repaired, British aircraft arrived to carry Japanese engineers to fix bridges and structures in Myanmar. There were three or four flights every day, only able to transport three occupants, including the pilot. They also transported unwell people and people of importance to Taungoo in Myanmar. In 1952–53, Khun Yuam Airfield was among a number of destinations served by Thai Airways Company, with flights to Chiang Mai using Beechcraft Bonanzas and Noorduyn Norseman. In 1955, the airfield was added to the Bangkok-originating Douglas C-47 Skytrain network.

Khun Yuam Airfield was then shown on a 1957 United States Army map, on a 1971 Air America listing, and finally labeled closed on a 1983 Tactical Pilot Chart. After this, the airstrip remained abandoned, still appearing on listings onwards.

== Present ==
Today, Khun Yuam Airfield is abandoned. The airfield is still visible, with several obstructions on the runway.

=== Commemoration ===
In 1995, the Thai-Japan Friendship Memorial was established by Police Colonel Chertchai Chonthawat. Originally having a small, poorly maintained museum, in 2013, a new museum was financially funded by Japan and opened. Today, the museum houses over 1,000 artifacts left by Japanese soldiers. It's admission fees are 100 baht for adults and 50 baht for children.

== Incidents & accidents ==
- On 8 August 1953, a Noorduyn Norseman HS-SGB took off from Mae Sarieng, en route to Khun Yuam Airfield. While passing through Doi Mae Ya, Tambol Mae Jee, the aircraft had crashed due to poor weather conditions, approximately 26 km from Amphoe Pai. The wreckage was not located until 25 August 1953, over two weeks later. All six occupants were killed including Flight Lieutenant Sorot Chombhuthaveep.
