= Na Kian =

Na Kian นาเกียน
- Tambon
- Country: Thailand
- Province: Chiang Mai
- District: Omkoi

Population (2017)
  - Total: 10,695
- Time zone: UTC+7 (ICT)
- Postal code: 50310
- TIS 1099: 501806

Na Kian (Thai: นาเกียน) is a tambon (subdistrict) of Omkoi District, in Chiang Mai Province, Thailand. In 2017 it had a population of 10,695 people.

== History ==
The subdistrict was created effective 1 July 1990 by splitting off 11 administrative villages from Omkoi.

== Administration ==
=== Central administration ===
The tambon is divided into 21 administrative villages (mubans).

No.	Name	Thai
1.	Ban Mae Hong	บ้านแม่ฮอง
2.	Ban Mae Khong	บ้านแม่โขง
3.	Ban Na Kian	บ้านนาเกียน
4.	Ban Bai Na	บ้านใบหนา
5.	Ban Huai Khrang	บ้านห้วยครั่ง
6.	Ban Utum	บ้านอูตูม
7.	Ban Nong Ueng	บ้านหนองอึ่ง
8.	Ban Mae Lok	บ้านแม่ลอก
9.	Ban Huai Som	บ้านห้วยส้ม
10.	Ban Phipan	บ้านผีปาน
11.	Ban Mae Sate	บ้านแม่สะเต
12.	Ban Hang Luang	บ้านห่างหลวง
13.	Ban Sa-ngin	บ้านสงิน
14.	Ban Huai Bong	บ้านห้วยบง
15.	Ban Mae Thoep	บ้านแม่เกิบ
16.	Ban Thilong	บ้านทีลอง
17.	Ban Mae So	บ้านแม่สอ
18.	Ban Huai Lok	บ้านห้วยลอก
19.	Ban Nong Ueng Nuea	บ้านหนองอึ่งเหนือ
20.	Ban Kong Po Nuea	บ้านก๋องป๋อเหนือ
21.	Ban Thi Mo	บ้านทีเนอะ

=== Local administration ===
The area of the subdistrict is covered by the subdistrict administrative organization (SAO) Na Kian (องค์การบริหารส่วนตำบลนาเกียน).
