= Pa Faek, Phayao =

Pa Faek ป่าแฝก
- Subdistrict
- Location within Thailand
- Coordinates: 19°25′23″N 99°46′17″E
- Country: Thailand
- Province: Phayao
- District: Mae Chai

Population (2005)
  - Total: 5,538
- Time zone: UTC+7 (ICT)

Pa Faek, Phayao (Thai: ป่าแฝก, pronounced [pàː fɛ̀ːk]) is a village and subdistrict (tambon) in Mae Chai District, in Phayao Province, Thailand. As of 2005, it has a population of 5,538 people. It is in the northwestern part of the province not far from the border with Chiang Rai Province. It lies along Thailand Route 1 (Phahon Yothin Road) and is connected by road to Charoen Rat, Mae Chai and Phayao in the south and Mae Yen across into Chiang Rai Province to the north. The tambon has 10 villages under its jurisdiction. The tambon has mountainous terrain in east and plains in the middle with agricultural land and buildings.
