= Ban Aen =

Ban Aen บ้านแอ่น
- Tambon
- Interactive map of Ban Aen
- Country: Thailand
- Province: Chiang Mai
- Amphoe: Doi Tao

Population (2019)
  - Total: 2,556
- Time zone: UTC+7 (TST)
- Postal code: 50260
- TIS 1099: 501704

Ban Aen (Thai: บ้านแอ่น) is a tambon (subdistrict) of Doi Tao District, in Chiang Mai Province, Thailand. In 2019, it had a total population of 2,556 people.

== Geography ==
There is a dam and reservoir in the vicinity.

== Administration ==
=== Central administration ===
The tambon is subdivided into 4 administrative villages (muban).

No.	Name	Thai
1.	Ban Wang Mo	บ้านวังหม้อ
2.	Ban Aen Mai	บ้านแอ่นใหม่
3.	Ban Aen Chatsan	บ้านแอ่นจัดสรร
4.	Ban Huai Sai Mun	บ้านห้วยทรายมูล

=== Local administration ===
The whole area of the subdistrict is covered by the subdistrict administrative organization (SAO) Ban Aen (องค์การบริหารส่วนตำบลบ้านแอ่น).
