= Khun Mae La Noi =

Khun Mae La Noi ขุนแม่ลาน้อย
- Subdistrict
- Country: Thailand
- Province: Mae Hong Son
- District: Mae La Noi

Population (2005)
  - Total: 2,695
- Time zone: UTC+7 (ICT)

Khun Mae La Noi (Thai: ขุนแม่ลาน้อย) is a village and tambon (sub-district) of Mae La Noi District, in Mae Hong Son Province, Thailand. In 2005 it had a population of 2,695. The tambon contains five villages.
