= Mae Tho =

Mae Tho แม่โถ
- Subdistrict
- Country: Thailand
- Province: Mae Hong Son
- District: Mae La Noi

Population (2005)
  - Total: 3,456
- Time zone: UTC+7 (ICT)

Mae Tho (Thai: แม่โถ, RTGS: Mae Tho) is a village and tambon (sub-district) of Mae La Noi District, in Mae Hong Son Province, Thailand. In 2005 it had a population of 3,456. The tambon contains eight villages.
