= Huai Hom =

- Subdistrict
- Country: Thailand
- Province: Mae Hong Son
- District: Mae La Noi

Population (2005)
  - Total: 4,346
- Time zone: UTC+7 (ICT)

Huai Hom (Thai: ?) is a village and tambon (sub-district) of Mae La Noi District, in Mae Hong Son Province, Thailand. In 2005 it had a population of 4,346 people. The tambon contains nine villages.

The village is populated by the Pakakayor ethnic group. It is known as the first community in Thailand to raise sheep to produce woolen cloth. US missionaries visiting in 1957 encouraged the inhabitants to raise sheep and grow coffee plants. The 1,000 metre elevation proved to be ideal for the cultivation of Arabica coffee. The king and queen visited the village in 1970 and expressed concern over the level of deforestation and generally low quality of life. In 1978, on a follow-up visit, the king was shown a small stream called Huai Ba Khi. The king suggested the digging of three catch-basins to store water. The villagers spent the next 10 years digging the reservoirs with hoes and shovels. As of 2016 they are still in use providing drinking water to the village. The Mae La Noi Royal Project Development Centre was founded in 1980 to introduce highland crops. The queen helped improve the quality of sheep fleeces by importing breeds better suited to the environment.
