= Mae Chai =

Mae Chai แม่ใจ
- Subdistrict
- Location within Thailand
- Coordinates: 19°21′N 99°50′E
- Country: Thailand
- Province: Phayao
- District: Mae Chai

Population (2005)
  - Total: 5,094
- Time zone: UTC+7 (ICT)

Mae Chai (Thai: แม่ใจ, pronounced [mɛ̂ː t͡ɕāj]) is a small town and subdistrict (tambon) in Mae Chai District, in Phayao Province, Thailand. It is the principal town in the district. The town is split with tambon Si Thoi. As of 2005, it has a population of 5,094 people. It is in the northwestern part of the province not far from the border with Lampang Province. It lies along National Road 1 (Phahon Yothin Road), and is connected by road to Phayao in the south. To the north along the highway are Pa Faek and then Mae Yen across into Chiang Rai Province. The tambon has 10 villages under its jurisdiction. It lies partly within Mae Puem National Park. Mae Chai River is the river running through the area.

== Economy ==
In the 1950s, the area was reported to be heavily forested but it saw an extraordinary growth in rice production in the 1990s. The tambon also has great conditions with temperature and rainfall for highland wheat production, which has been exploited in villages such as Pha Daeng with improved technology. Red kidney beans are also grown in the area.
