= Tha Duea =

Coordinates: 17.9560°N 98.6799°E

Tha Duea ท่าเดื่อ
- Tambon
- Interactive map of Tha Duea
- Country: Thailand
- Province: Chiang Mai
- District: Doi Tao

Population (2005)
  - Total: 3,242
- Time zone: UTC+7 (ICT)

Tha Duea (Thai: ท่าเดื่อ, pronounced [tʰâː dɯ̀a̯]) is a tambon (subdistrict) of Doi Tao District, in Chiang Mai Province, Thailand. In 2005 it had a population of 3242. The tambon contains six villages.
