= Mae Daet =

Mae Daet แม่แดด
- Tambon
- Interactive map of Mae Daet
- Coordinates: 18°57′52″N 98°24′59″E
- Country: Thailand
- Province: Chiang Mai
- District: Galyani Vadhana

Population (2012)
  - Total: 3,601
- Time zone: UTC+7 (ICT)

Mae Daet (Thai: แม่แดด) is a tambon (subdistrict) of Galyani Vadhana District, in Chiang Mai Province, Thailand. In 2012 it had a population of 3,601 people.

== History ==
The subdistrict was created in 1995, when five administrative villages were split off from Ban Chan subdistrict.

== Administration ==
The subdistrict is divided into eight administrative villages. The Mae Daet Subdistrict administrative organization is the local government responsible for the subdistrict area, established in 1999.

No.	Name	Thai
1.	Ban Mae Pha Pu	บ้านแม่ผาปู
2.	Ban Mae Tala Nuea	บ้านแม่ตะละเหนือ
3.	Ban Mae Tala Tai	บ้านแม่ตะละใต้
4.	Ban Mae Daed Noi	บ้านแม่แดดน้อย
5.	Ban Huai Pu	บ้านห้วยปู
6.	Ban Dong Sam Muen	บ้านดงสามหมื่น
7.	Ban Mae Tala Mong	บ้านแม่ตะละม้ง
8.	Ban Mae Tala Mong Mai	บ้านแม่ตะละม้งใหม่

Administrative village 8 was established on 14 January 2014.
