= Tat Khwan =

Tat Khwan ตาดควัน
- Tambon
- Country: Thailand
- Province: Chiang Rai
- District: Phaya Mengrai

Population (2005)
  - Total: 4,676
- Time zone: UTC+7 (ICT)

Tat Khwan (Thai: ตาดควัน) is a village and tambon (subdistrict) of Phaya Mengrai District, in Chiang Rai Province, Thailand. In 2005 it had a population of 4,676 people. The tambon contains eight villages.
