= Tha Pha Pum =

Coordinates: 18.3101°N 97.9118°E

Tha Pha Pum ท่าผาปุ้ม
- Subdistrict
- Interactive map of Tha Pha Pum
- Country: Thailand
- Province: Mae Hong Son
- District: Mae La Noi

Population (2005)
  - Total: 4,052
- Time zone: UTC+7 (ICT)

Tha Pha Pum (Thai: ท่าผาปุ้ม) is a village and tambon (sub-district) of Mae La Noi District, in Mae Hong Son Province, Thailand. In 2005 it had a population of 4,052. The tambon contains eight villages.
