= Kong Koi =

Kong Koi กองก๋อย
- Subdistrict
- Interactive map of Kong Koi
- Country: Thailand
- Province: Mae Hong Son
- District: Sop Moei

Population (2005)
  - Total: 5,796
- Time zone: UTC+7 (ICT)

Kong Koi (Thai: กองก๋อย) is a village and tambon (sub-district) of Sop Moei District, in Mae Hong Son Province, Thailand. In 2005 it had a population of 5,796. The tambon contains nine villages.
