= Sop Moei subdistrict =

Sop Moei สบเมย
- Subdistrict
- Location within Thailand
- Country: Thailand
- Province: Mae Hong Son
- District: Sop Moei

Population (2005)
  - Total: 7,015
- Time zone: UTC+7 (ICT)

Sop Moei (Thai: สบเมย) is a village and tambon (sub-district) of Sop Moei District, in Mae Hong Son Province, Thailand. In 2005 it had a population of 7,015 people. The tambon contains 12 villages.
