= Mon Chong =

Mon Chong ม่อนจอง
- Tambon
- Country: Thailand
- Province: Chiang Mai
- District: Omkoi

Population (2017)
  - Total: 5,809
- Time zone: UTC+7 (ICT)
- Postal code: 50310
- TIS 1099: 501804

Mon Chong (Thai: ม่อนจอง) is a tambon (subdistrict) of Omkoi District, in Chiang Mai Province, Thailand. In 2017 it had a population of 5,809 people.

== History ==
The subdistrict was created effective 1 April 1982 by splitting off eight administrative villages from Mae Tuen.

== Administration ==
=== Central administration ===
The tambon is divided into nine administrative villages (mubans).

No.	Name	Thai
1.	Ban Hong Ku Khao	บ้านโห้งกู่ขาว
2.	Ban Huai Nam Khao	บ้านห้วยน้ำขาว
3.	Ban Huai Pu Ling	บ้านห้วยปูลิง
4.	Ban Om Phaen	บ้านอมแพม
5.	Ban Mu Soe	บ้านมูเซอ
6.	Ban Huai Mai Hok	บ้านห้วยไม้หก
7.	Ban Dong	บ้านดง
8.	Ban San Ton Muang	บ้านสันต้นม่วง
9.	Ban Huai Nam Tan	บ้านห้วยน้ำดั้น

=== Local administration ===
The area of the subdistrict is covered by the subdistrict administrative organization (SAO) Mon Chong (องค์การบริหารส่วนตำบลม่อนจอง).
