= Santi Khiri, Mae Hong Son =

Santi Khiri สันติคีรี
- Subdistrict
- Country: Thailand
- Province: Mae Hong Son
- District: Mae La Noi

Population (2005)
  - Total: 2,669
- Time zone: UTC+7 (ICT)

Santi Khiri, Mae Hong Son (Thai: สันติคีรี) is a village and tambon (sub-district) of Mae La Noi District, in Mae Hong Son Province, Thailand. In 2005 it had a population of 2,669. The tambon contains eight villages.
