= Bong Tan =

Bong Tan บงตัน
- Tambon
- Country: Thailand
- Province: Chiang Mai
- District: Doi Tao

Population (2005)
  - Total: 4,678
- Time zone: UTC+7 (ICT)

Bong Tan (Thai: บงตัน) is a tambon (subdistrict) of Doi Tao District, in the Chiang Mai Province, Thailand. In 2005, it had a population of 4,678. The tambon contains six villages.
