= Pong Thung =

Pong Thung โปงทุ่ง
- Tambon
- Country: Thailand
- Province: Chiang Mai
- District: Doi Tao

Population (2005)
  - Total: 6,407
- Time zone: UTC+7 (ICT)

Pong Thung (Thai: โปงทุ่ง) is a tambon (subdistrict) of Doi Tao District, in Chiang Mai Province, Thailand. In 2005 it had a population of 6,407. The tambon contains 11 villages.
