= Pa Pong, Mae Hong Son =

Coordinates: 18.1503°N 98.1296°E

Pa Pong
- Subdistrict
- Interactive map of Pa Pong
- Country: Thailand
- Province: Mae Hong Son
- District: Sop Moei

Population (2005)
  - Total: 4,286
- Time zone: UTC+7 (ICT)

Pa Pong (Thai: ?) is a village and tambon (sub-district) of Sop Moei District, in Mae Hong Son Province, Thailand. In 2005 it had a population of 4,286. The tambon contains seven villages.
