= Mae Ngao =

Village and tambon in Thailand

Coordinates: 18.8060°N 97.9079°E

Mae Ngao แม่เงา
- Subdistrict
- Interactive map of Mae Ngao
- Country: Thailand
- Province: Mae Hong Son
- District: Khun Yuam

Population (2005)
  - Total: 3,068
- Time zone: UTC+7 (ICT)

Mae Ngao (Thai: แม่เงา) is a village and tambon (sub-district) of Khun Yuam District, in Mae Hong Son Province, Thailand. In 2005 it had a population of 3,068 people. The tambon contains 10 villages.
