= Mae Sam Laep =

Mae Sam Laep แม่สามแลบ
- Subdistrict
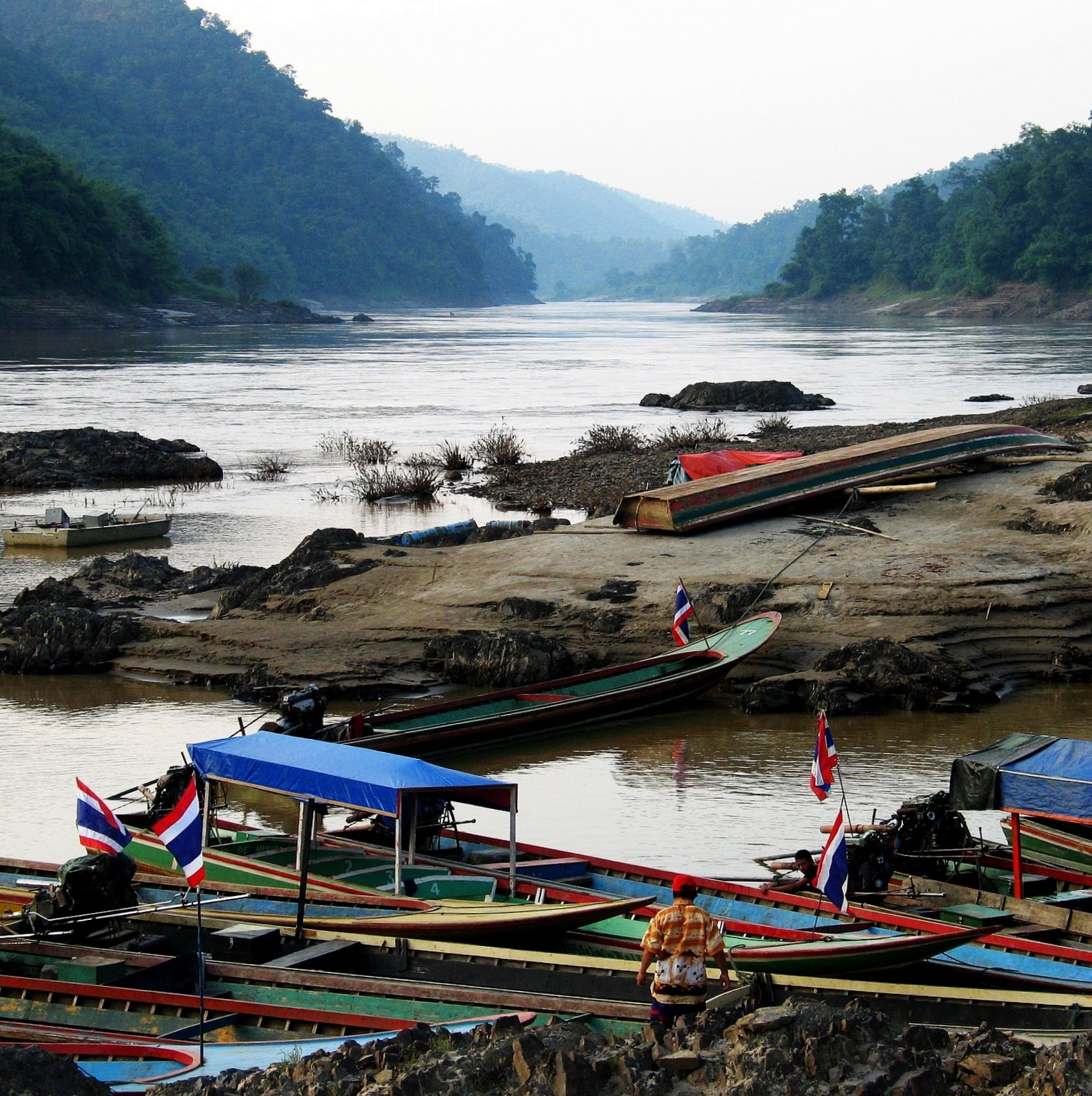
- Interactive map of Mae Sam Laep
- Coordinates: 17°58′30″N 97°44′21″E
- Country: Thailand
- Province: Mae Hong Son
- District: Sop Moei

Population (2005)
  - Total: 9,802
- Time zone: UTC+7 (ICT)

Mae Sam Laep (Thai: แม่สามแลบ) is a village and tambon (sub-district) of Sop Moei District, in Mae Hong Son Province, Thailand. In 2005 it had a population of 9,802. The tambon contains 10 villages. Mae Sam Laep lies on the Salween River which marks the border with Myanmar.
