= Mae Tam, Chiang Rai =

Mae Tam
- Tambon
- Location in Thailand
- Coordinates: 19°55′58″N 100°15′25″E
- Country: Thailand
- Province: Chiang Rai
- District: Phaya Mengrai

Population (2005)
  - Total: 5,026
- Time zone: UTC+7 (ICT)

Mae Tam (Thai: ?) is a village and tambon (subdistrict) of Phaya Mengrai District, in Chiang Rai Province, Thailand. In 2005 it had a population of 5026 people. The tambon contains 11 villages. To the southwest is Cham Tong Lake, also known as Mae Tam Reservoir.
