= Mae La Noi district =

Mae La Noi แม่ลาน้อย
- District
- District location in Mae Hong Son province
- Coordinates: 18°23′4″N 97°56′13″E
- Country: Thailand
- Province: Mae Hong Son
- Seat: Mae La Noi

Area
  - Total: 1,456.6 km^{2} (562.4 sq mi)

Population (2005)
  - Total: 34,126
  - Density: 23.4/km^{2} (61/sq mi)
- Time zone: UTC+7 (ICT)
- Postal code: 58120
- Geocode: 5805

Mae La Noi (Thai: แม่ลาน้อย, pronounced [mɛ̂ː lāː nɔ́ːj]) is a district (amphoe) in the southern part of Mae Hong Son province, northern Thailand.

== History ==
The minor district (king amphoe) was created on 10 February 1967, consisting of the two tambons, Mae La Noi and Mae La Luang. It was made a subordinate of Mae Sariang district, from which the tambon Mae La Noi was split off. Mae La Luang originally belonged to Khun Yuam district. It was upgraded to a full district on 21 August 1975.

== Geography ==
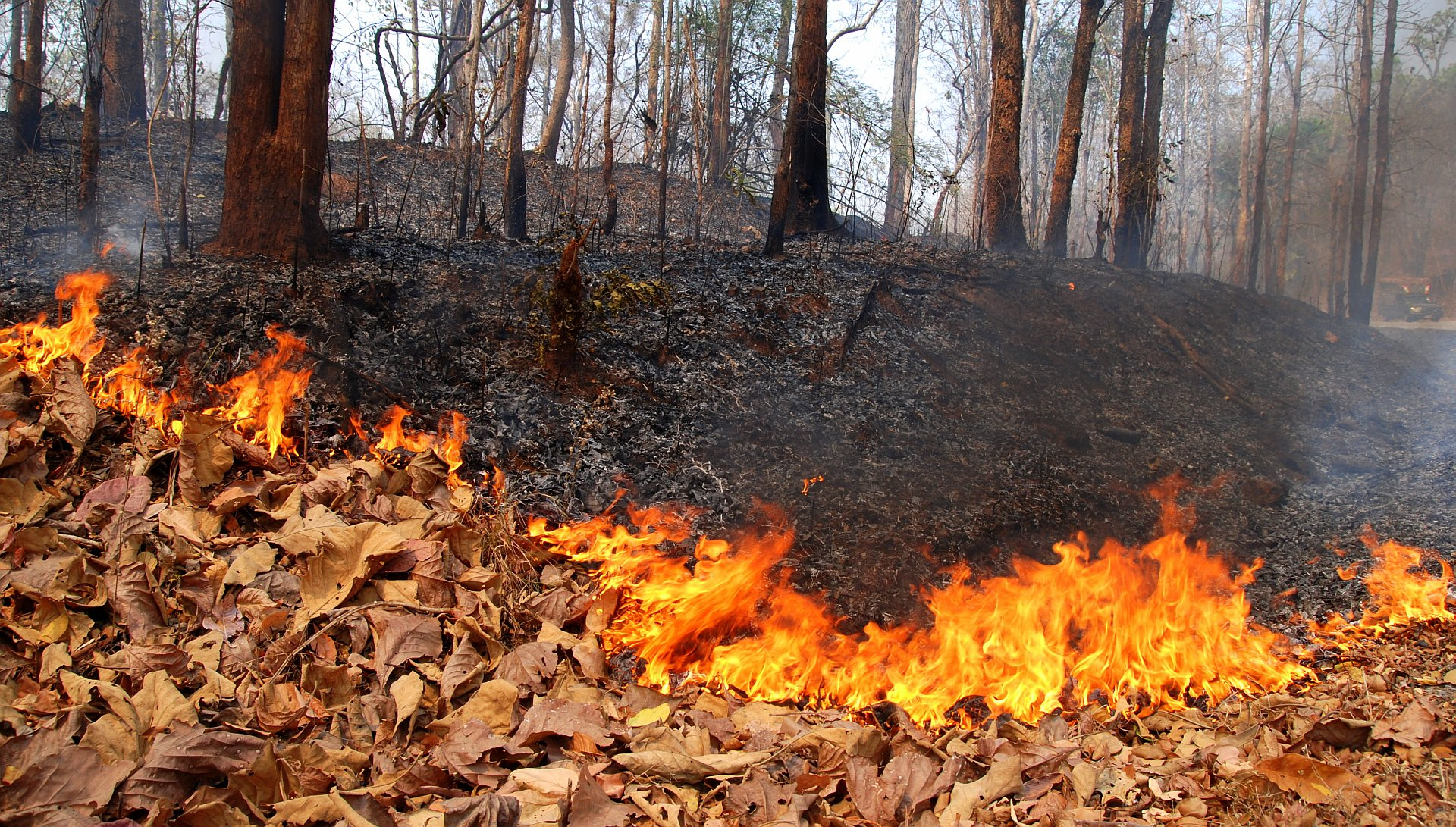
Forest fire during the dry season

Neighboring districts are (from southwest clockwise): Mae Sariang of Mae Hong Son Province, Kayah State of Myanmar, Khun Yuam of Mae Hong Son Province and Mae Chaem of Chiang Mai province.

The important rivers of Mae La Noi are the Yuam, Mae La Luang and Mae La Noi Rivers.

== Administration ==
The district is divided into eight sub-districts (tambons), which are further subdivided into 69 villages (mubans). Mae La Noi is also a township (thesaban tambon) which covers parts of tambon Mae La Noi. There are eight tambon administrative organizations (TAO).

No.	Name	Thai name	Villages	Pop.
1.	Mae La Noi	แม่ลาน้อย	15	8,674
2.	Mae La Luang	แม่ลาหลวง	9	5,140
3.	Tha Pha Pum	ท่าผาปุ้ม	8	4,052
4.	Mae Tho	แม่โถ	8	3,456
5.	Huai Hom	ห้วยห้อม	9	4,346
6.	Mae Na Chang	แม่นาจาง	7	3,094
7.	Santi Khiri	สันติคีรี	8	2,669
8.	Khun Mae La Noi	ขุนแม่ลาน้อย	5	2,695
