= Mae Phrik, Chiang Rai =

Tambon in Thailand

Mae Phrik แม่พริก
- Tambon
- Interactive map of Mae Phrik
- Country: Thailand
- Province: Chiang Rai
- District: Mae Suai

Population (2005)
  - Total: 5,808
- Time zone: UTC+7 (ICT)

Mae Phrik, Chiang Rai (Thai: แม่พริก) is a village and tambon (sub-district) of Mae Suai District, in Chiang Rai Province, Thailand. In 2005 it had a population of 5,808 people. The tambon contains 13 villages.
