= Mae Khatuan =

Coordinates: 18.0664°N 97.9331°E

Mae Khatuan แม่คะตวน
- Subdistrict
- Interactive map of Mae Khatuan
- Country: Thailand
- Province: Mae Hong Son
- District: Sop Moei

Population (2005)
  - Total: 7,000
- Time zone: UTC+7 (ICT)

Mae Khatuan (Thai: แม่คะตวน) is a village and tambon (sub-district) of Sop Moei District, in Mae Hong Son Province, Thailand. In 2005 it had a population of 7,000. The tambon contains eight villages.
