= Mae O =

Coordinates: 19°39′N 99°50′E

Mae O แม่อ้อ
- Tambon
- Interactive map of Mae O
- Country: Thailand
- Province: Chiang Rai
- Amphoe: Phan

Population (2005)
  - Total: 9,799
- Time zone: UTC+7 (ICT)

Mae O (Thai: แม่อ้อ) is a village and tambon (subdistrict) of Phan District, in Chiang Rai Province, Thailand. In 2005 it had a population of 9,799 people. The tambon contains 20 villages.
