= Mae Na Chang =

Mae Na Chang แม่นาจาง
- Subdistrict
- Country: Thailand
- Province: Mae Hong Son
- District: Mae La Noi

Population (2005)
  - Total: 3,094
- Time zone: UTC+7 (ICT)

Mae Na Chang (Thai: แม่นาจาง) is a village and tambon (sub-district) of Mae La Noi District, in Mae Hong Son Province, Thailand. In 2005 it had a population of 3,094. The tambon contains seven villages.
