= Galyani Vadhana district =

Galyani Vadhana กัลยาณิวัฒนา
- District
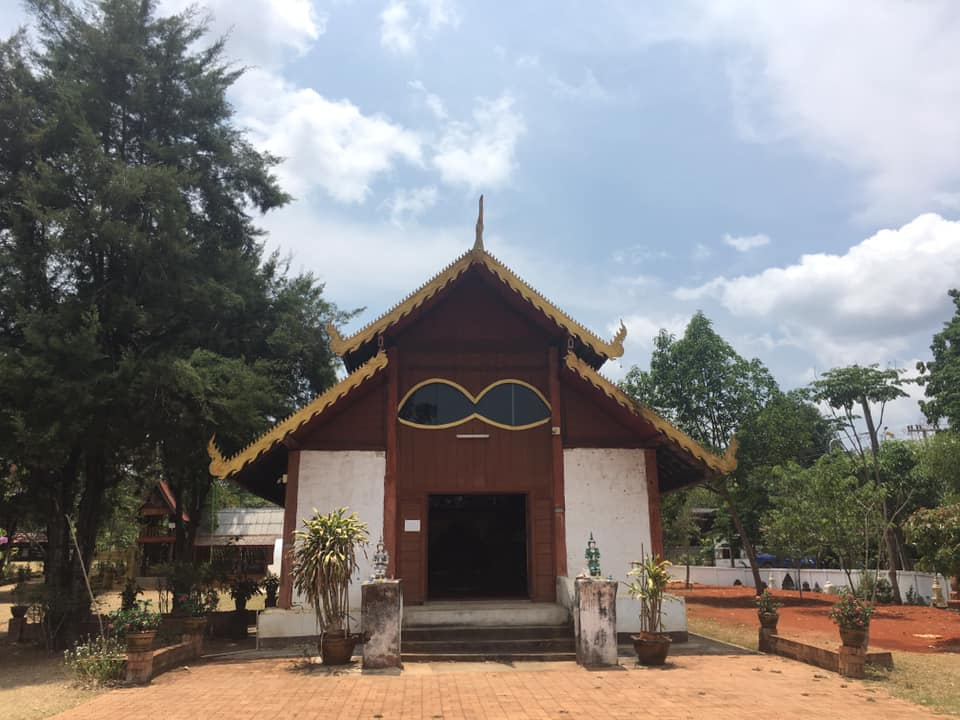
- Wat Chan

- District location in Chiang Mai province
- Coordinates: 19°4′1″N 98°17′40″E
- Country: Thailand
- Province: Chiang Mai
- Seat: Chaem Luang

Area
  - Total: 647.58 km^{2} (250.03 sq mi)

Population (2008)
  - Total: 10,593
  - Density: 16.4/km^{2} (42/sq mi)
- Time zone: UTC+7 (ICT)
- Postal code: 50270
- Geocode: 5026

Galyani Vadhana (Thai: กัลยาณิวัฒนา; RTGS: Kanlayaniwatthana) is a district (amphoe) of Chiang Mai province in northern Thailand. It is named after Princess Galyani Vadhana. It was founded on 26 December 2009, by the Royal Decree Establishing Amphoe Galyani Vadhana, Changwat Chiang Mai, BE 2552 (2009), making it the 878th and latest district of Thailand.

== History ==
The project of creating a new district in the area dates back to 1993. On 17 May 1993 the tambon council of Ban Chan Sub-district proposed the creation of the minor district out of three sub-districts of Mae Chaem district. In the following years its creation was prepared, however with the onset of the Asian financial crisis in 1997 all pending new districts were cancelled by the government in order to avoid additional costs.

Around 2005 the project was revived and proposals and studies were completed by Chiang Mai Province and the Department of Provincial Administration. On 2 December 2008 the cabinet approved in principle the creation of the new district in honor of Princess Galyani Vadhana as proposed by the Ministry of Interior.

On 7 July 2009 King Bhumibol Adulyadej officially bestowed the name Galyani Vadhana on the new district, which was previously referred to by the name Wat Chan (วัดจันทร์). In the cabinet meeting on 13 October the Ministry of Interior was authorized to set up the new district.

Due to the fact that it has a royal project in Ban Chan, the new district did not need to be a sub-district (king amphoe) at first and could be created as a full district directly. The district office is under construction in Village 2 of Chaem Luang Sub-district. Until its completion, the rooms of the sub-district council Ban Chan will be used as a temporary district office.

The Abhisit Government completed drawing up a draft Royal Decree Establishing Amphoe Galyani Vadhana on 13 October 2009 and King Bhumibol Adulyadej signed it on 18 December of the same year. The "Royal Decree Establishing Amphoe Galyani Vadhana, Changwat Chiang Mai, BE 2552 (2009)" was published in the Government Gazette volume 126/part 97 A/page 7/dated 25 December 2009 and came into force the following day.

== Geography ==
Neighboring districts are (from the east clockwise) Samoeng and Mae Chaem of Chiang Mai Province, and Mueang Mae Hong Son and Pai of Mae Hong Son province. The district is in the mountains of the Thanon Thong Chai Range, with settlements mostly in the valleys.

== Administration ==
The district is divided into three sub-districts (tambon), which are further subdivided into 22 villages (muban). Each of the sub-districts is administered by a tambon administrative organization (TAO).

No.	Name	Thai name	Villages	Population
1	Ban Chan	บ้านจันทร์	7	3,707
2	Mae Daet	แม่แดด	8	3,359
3	Chaem Luang	แจ่มหลวง	7	3,527
