= Mae Suat =

Mae Suat แม่สวด
- Subdistrict
- Interactive map of Mae Suat
- Country: Thailand
- Province: Mae Hong Son
- District: Sop Moei

Population (2005)
  - Total: 7,827
- Time zone: UTC+7 (ICT)

Mae Suat (Thai: แม่สวด) is a village and tambon (sub-district) of Sop Moei District, in Mae Hong Son Province, Thailand. In 2005 it had a population of 7,827. The tambon contains 12 villages.
