= Mae La Luang =

Coordinates: 18°32′N 97°56′E

Mae La Luang แม่ลาหลวง
- Subdistrict
- Interactive map of Mae La Luang
- Country: Thailand
- Province: Mae Hong Son
- District: Mae La Noi

Population (2005)
  - Total: 5,140
- Time zone: UTC+7 (ICT)

Mae La Luang (Thai: แม่ลาหลวง) is a village and tambon (sub-district) of Mae La Noi District, in Mae Hong Son Province, Thailand. In 2005 it had a population of 5,140. The tambon contains nine villages.
