= Mae Pao =

Mae Pao แม่เปา
- Tambon
- Country: Thailand
- Province: Chiang Rai
- District: Phaya Mengrai

Population (2005)
  - Total: 11,302
- Time zone: UTC+7 (ICT)

Mae Pao (Thai: แม่เปา) is a village and tambon (subdistrict) of Phaya Mengrai District, in Chiang Rai Province, Thailand. The tambon contains 19 villages. In 2005 it had a population of 11,302 people.
