= Si Thoi, Chiang Rai =

Coordinates: 19.6139°N 99.4783°E

Si Thoi ศรีถ้อย
- Tambon
- Interactive map of Si Thoi
- Country: Thailand
- Province: Chiang Rai
- District: Mae Suai

Population (2014)
  - Total: 6,282
- Time zone: UTC+7 (ICT)
- Postal code: 57180
- TIS 1099: 571004

Si Thoi, Chiang Rai (Thai: ศรีถ้อย) is a tambon (sub-district) of Mae Suai District, in Chiang Rai Province, Thailand. In 2014 it had a population of 6,282 people.

== Administration ==
=== Central administration ===
The tambon is divided into 12 administrative villages (mubans).

No.	Name	Thai
1.	Ban Thung Tom	บ้านทุ่งต้อม
2.	Ban Pa Wai	บ้านป่าหวาย
3.	Ban Bong Bua Suang	บ้านหนองบัวสรวย
4.	Ban Mae Yang Min	บ้านแม่ยางมิ้น
5.	Ban Huai Hia	บ้านห้วยเฮี้ย
6.	Ban Phaya Kong Di	บ้านพญากองดี
7.	Ban Thung Yao	บ้านทุ่งยาว
8.	Ban Si Thoi	บ้านศรีถ้อย
9.	Ban Ayiko	บ้านอายิโก๊ะ
10.	Ban Thong Thip	บ้านทองทิพย์
11.	Ban Mai Mae Yang Min	บ้านใหม่แม่ยางมิ้น
12.	Ban Muang Kham	บ้านม่วงคำ

=== Local administration ===
The area of the sub-district is covered by the sub-district administrative organization (SAO) Si Thoi (องค์การบริหารส่วนตำบลศรีถ้อย)
