= Mae Ukho =

Mae Ukho แม่อูคอ
- Subdistrict
- Country: Thailand
- Province: Mae Hong Son
- District: Khun Yuam

Population (2005)
  - Total: 3,283
- Time zone: UTC+7 (ICT)

Mae Ukho (Thai: แม่อูคอ) is a village and tambon (sub-district) of Khun Yuam District, in Mae Hong Son Province, Thailand. In 2005 it had a population of 3,283 people. The tambon contains six villages.
