= Mae Yuam Noi =

Mae Yuam Noi แม่ยวมน้อย
- Subdistrict
- Country: Thailand
- Province: Mae Hong Son
- District: Khun Yuam

Population (2005)
  - Total: 2,464
- Time zone: UTC+7 (ICT)

Mae Yuam Noi (Thai: แม่ยวมน้อย) is a village and tambon (sub-district) of Khun Yuam District, in Mae Hong Son Province, Thailand. In 2005, it had a population of 2,464. The tambon contains eight villages.
