= Muet Ka =

Muet Ka มืดกา
- Tambon
- Country: Thailand
- Province: Chiang Mai
- District: Doi Tao

Population (2005)
  - Total: 3,363
- Time zone: UTC+7 (ICT)

Muet Ka (Thai: มืดกา, pronounced [mɯ̂ːt kāː]) is a tambon (subdistrict) of Doi Tao District, in Chiang Mai Province, Thailand. In 2005 it had a population of 3363. The tambon contains five villages.
