= Mueang Pon =

Coordinates: 18.7461°N 97.9269°E

Mueang Pon เมืองปอน
- Subdistrict
- Interactive map of Mueang Pon
- Country: Thailand
- Province: Mae Hong Son
- District: Khun Yuam

Population (2005)
  - Total: 4,437
- Time zone: UTC+7 (ICT)

Mueang Pon (Thai: เมืองปอน) is a village and tambon (sub-district) of Khun Yuam District, in Mae Hong Son Province, Thailand. In 2005 it had a population of 4,437 people. The tambon contains ten villages.

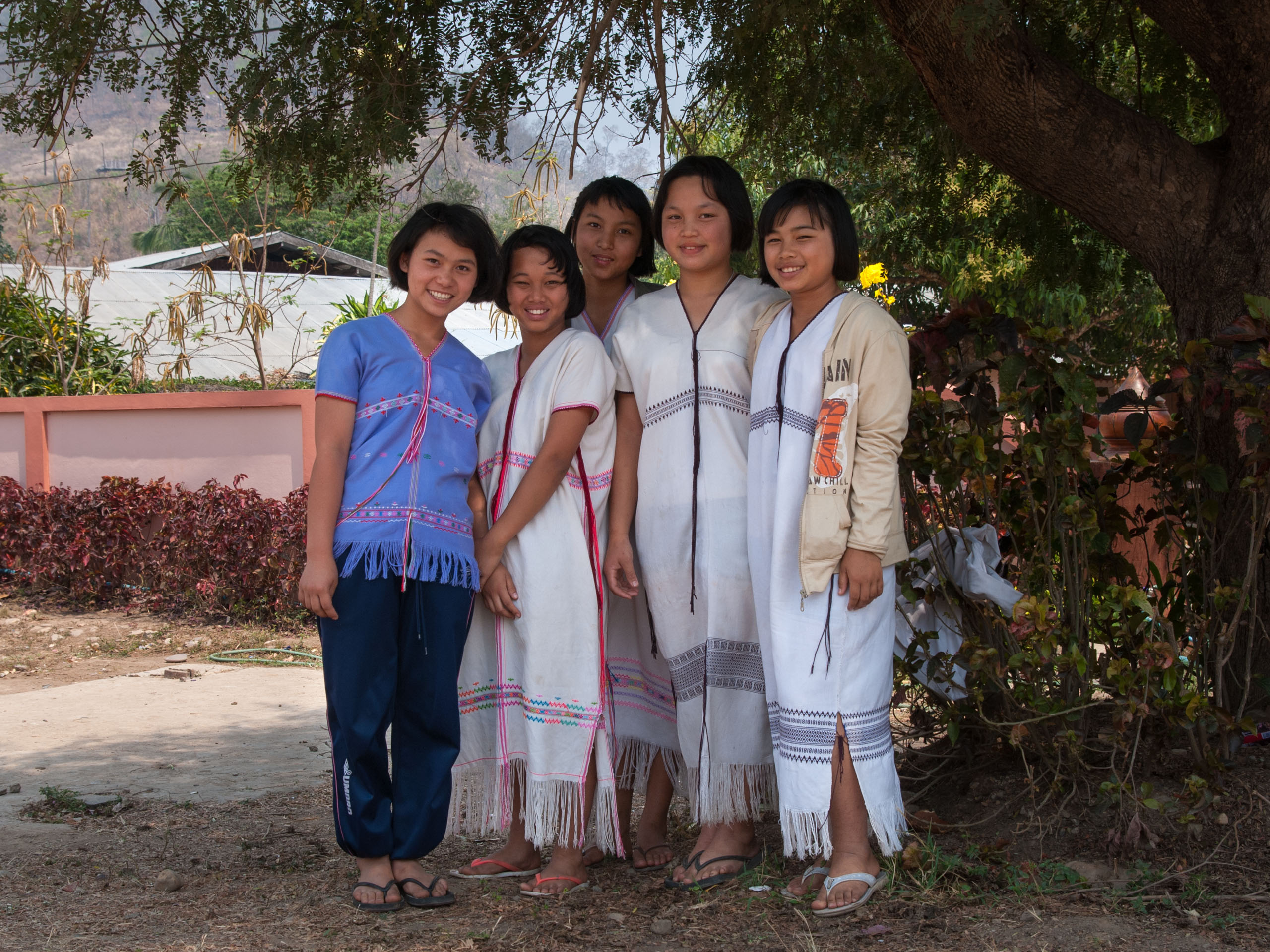
Girls of the S'gaw people, a subgroup of the Karen, standing outside their school in Nong Haeng village (March 2010)
