= Mae La Noi subdistrict =

Coordinates: 18°24′N 97°54′E

Mae La Noi แม่ลาน้อย
- Subdistrict
- Interactive map of Mae La Noi
- Country: Thailand
- Province: Mae Hong Son
- District: Mae La Noi

Population (2005)
  - Total: 8,674
- Time zone: UTC+7 (ICT)

Mae La Noi (Thai: แม่ลาน้อย) is a village and tambon (sub-district) of Mae La Noi District, in Mae Hong Son Province, Thailand. In 2005 it had a population of 8,674. The tambon contains 15 villages.
