= Sop Moei district =

Sop Moei สบเมย
- District
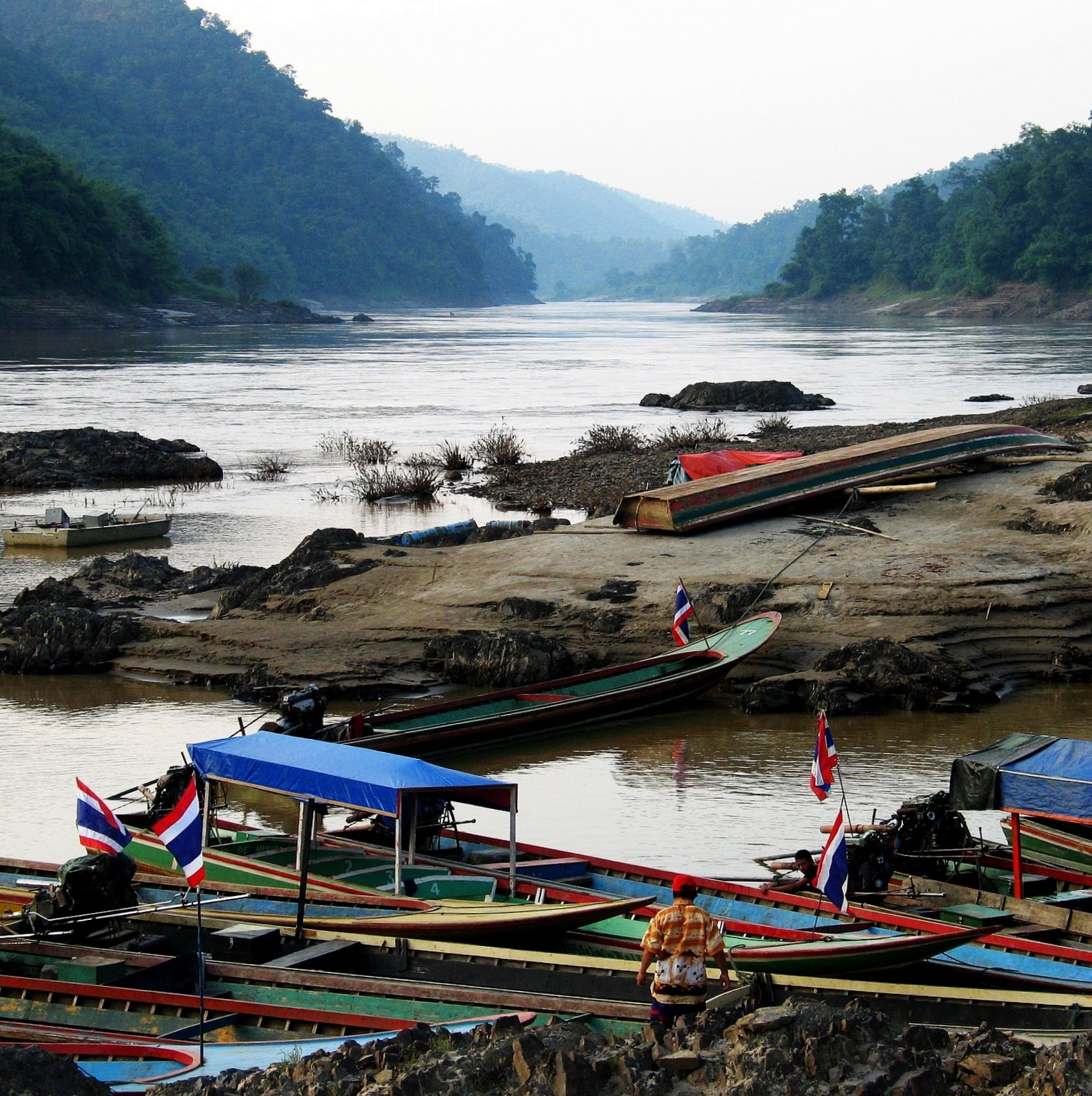
- Salawin river at the Thai border village of Mae Sam Laep

- District location in Mae Hong Son province
- Coordinates: 17°57′43″N 97°56′0″E
- Country: Thailand
- Province: Mae Hong Son
- Seat: Mae Suat

Area
  - Total: 1,412.7 km^{2} (545.4 sq mi)

Population (2005)
  - Total: 41,726
  - Density: 29.5/km^{2} (76/sq mi)
- Time zone: UTC+7 (ICT)
- Postal code: 58110
- Geocode: 5806

Sop Moei (Thai: สบเมย, pronounced [sòp mɤ̄ːj]) is the southernmost district (amphoe) of Mae Hong Son province, northern Thailand.

== History ==
Tambons Sop Moei, Mae Khatuan, and Kong Koi were separated from Mae Sariang district to create Sop Moei minor district (king amphoe) on 1 April 1984. It was upgraded to a full district on 3 November 1993.

Sop Moei means 'confluence with Moei', as this is the point where the Salween River meets the Moei Rivers.

== Geography ==
Neighbouring districts are (from south clockwise): Tha Song Yang of Tak province, Kayin State of Myanmar, Mae Sariang of Mae Hong Son Province, Hot and Omkoi of Chiang Mai province.

The important rivers of the district are the Salween, Moei, Ngao and Yuam Rivers.

Mae Ngao National Park is in the district.

== Environment ==
The Thai government, to solve persistent water shortages in the central region, have proposed a 70.7 billion baht plan to divert some 1.8 billion m^{3} of water annually from the Yuam River to the perennially underfilled Bhumibol Dam. The Sop Moei District would be one of the districts most impacted. As part of the plan, the Royal Irrigation Department (RID), would build 69 metre high dam with a storage capacity of 68.7 million m^{3} constructed on 2,075 rai of forest land, together with a pumping station on a separate 55 rai plot and a 61.5 kilometre-long tunnel passing through 14 villages. The inhabitants of the area—primarily Karen tribes people—largely oppose the project. In December 2019, the RID submitted a second environmental impact assessment (EIA) to the Office of the Natural Resources and Environmental Policy and Planning (ONEP). ONEP rejected the EIA for the second time due to concerns about forest destruction, tunnel rock waste, and compensation issues.

== Administration ==
The district is divided into six sub-districts (tambons), which are further subdivided into 58 villages (mubans). There are no municipal (thesaban) areas. There are six tambon administrative organizations (TAO).

No.	Name	Thai name	Villages	Pop.
1.	Sop Moei	สบเมย	12	7,015
2.	Mae Khatuan	แม่คะตวน	8	7,000
3.	Kong Koi	กองก๋อย	9	5,796
4.	Mae Suat	แม่สวด	12	7,827
5.	Pa Pong	ป่าโปง	7	4,286
6.	Mae Sam Laep	แม่สามแลบ	10	9,802
