= Mai Ya =

Mai Ya ไม้ยา
- Tambon
- Interactive map of Mai Ya
- Coordinates: 19°44′04″N 100°06′40″E
- Country: Thailand
- Province: Chiang Rai
- District: Phaya Mengrai

Population (2005)
  - Total: 11,069
- Time zone: UTC+7 (ICT)

Mai Ya (Thai: ไม้ยา) is a village and tambon (subdistrict) of Phaya Mengrai District, in Chiang Rai Province, Thailand. In 2005 it had a population of 11,069 people. The tambon contains 18 villages.
