= Mae Chai district =

Mae Chai แม่ใจ
- District
- District location in Phayao province
- Coordinates: 19°20′42″N 99°48′54″E
- Country: Thailand
- Province: Phayao
- Seat: Si Thoi
- Subdistricts: 6
- Mubans: 65

Area
  - Total: 300.761 km^{2} (116.124 sq mi)

Population (2005)
  - Total: 36,089
  - Density: 120/km^{2} (310/sq mi)
- Time zone: UTC+7 (ICT)
- Postal code: 56130
- Geocode: 5607

Mae Chai (Thai: แม่ใจ, pronounced [mɛ̂ː tɕāj]; Northern Thai: ᩯᨾ᩵ᩱᨩ᩠ᨿ, pronounced [mɛ̂ː tɕǎj]) is a district (amphoe) of the Phayao province in northern Thailand.

== History ==
The District Mae Chai was abolished on 23 December 1917 and was incorporated into Mueang Phan district. It was recreated as a minor district (king amphoe) on 24 January 1963. It was upgraded to a full district on 28 July 1965. In 1977 the district was reassigned from Chiang Rai Province to the newly established Phayao Province.

== Geography ==
The district is in the upper valley of the Ing River. West of the town Mae Chai is the 1,426 m high Doi Luang mountain of the Phi Pan Nam Range. It rises within a protected area in the Doi Luang National Park. To the east is the Nong Liang Sai Reservoir, and at the boundary to the Mueang District the Mae Pim Reservoir. Mae Puem National Park protects the Mae Puem National Conserved Forest and Dong Pradu Forest.

Neighboring districts are (from the north clockwise): Phan and Pa Daet of Chiang Rai province; Mueang Phayao of Phayao Province; and Wang Nuea of Lampang province.

== Administration ==
The district is divided into six sub-districts (tambons), which are further subdivided into 65 villages (mubans). The township (thesaban tambon) Mae Chai covers parts of tambons Mae Chai and Si Thoi. There are a further six tambon administrative organizations (TAO).

No.	Name	Thai name	Villages	Pop.
1.	Mae Chai	แม่ใจ	10	5,094
2.	Si Thoi	ศรีถ้อย	13	7,267
3.	Mae Suk	แม่สุก	10	5,830
4.	Pa Faek	ป่าแฝก	10	5,538
5.	Ban Lao	บ้านเหล่า	14	8,219
6.	Charoen Rat	เจริญราษฎร์	8	4,141
