= Khun Yuam subdistrict =

Khun Yuam ขุนยวม
- Subdistrict
- Location within Thailand
- Coordinates: 18°50′N 97°56′E
- Country: Thailand
- Province: Mae Hong Son
- District: Khun Yuam

Population (2005)
  - Total: 6,823
- Time zone: UTC+7 (ICT)

Khun Yuam Subdistrict (Thai: ขุนยวม) is a village and tambon (sub-district) of Khun Yuam District, in Mae Hong Son Province, Thailand. In 2005 it had a population of 6,823 people. The tambon contains six villages.
