= Yang Piang =

Coordinates: 17°46′N 98°30′E

Yang Piang ยางเปียง
- Tambon
- Interactive map of Yang Piang
- Country: Thailand
- Province: Chiang Mai
- District: Omkoi

Population (2017)
  - Total: 9,541
- Time zone: UTC+7 (ICT)
- Postal code: 50310
- TIS 1099: 501802

Yang Piang (Thai: ยางเปียง) is a tambon (subdistrict) of Omkoi District, in Chiang Mai Province, Thailand. In 2017 it had a population of 9,541 people.

== Administration ==
=== Central administration ===
The tambon is divided into 17 administrative villages (mubans).

No.	Name	Thai
1.	Ban Luang	บ้านหลวง
2.	Ban Yang Piang	บ้านยางเปียง
3.	Ban Mae Lan	บ้านแม่ลาน
4.	Ban Huai Pu	บ้านห้วยปู
5.	Ban Huai Khong	บ้านห้วยโค้ง
6.	Ban Huai Tong	บ้านห้วยตอง
7.	Ban Yang Khrok	บ้านยางครก
8.	Ban Pong	บ้านโป่ง
9.	Ban Na Khrai	บ้านนาไคร้
10.	Ban Sop Lan	บ้านสบลาน
11.	Ban Pit Khi	บ้านปิตุคี
12.	Ban Kong Sang	บ้านกองซาง
13.	Ban Doi	บ้านดอย
14.	Ban Mae Hae	บ้านแม่แฮ
15.	Ban Khun Hat	บ้านขุนหาด
16.	Ban Yang Piang Tai	บ้านยางเปียงใต้
17.	Ban Lang Pa Kha	บ้านหลังป่าข่า

=== Local administration ===
The area of the subdistrict is covered by the subdistrict administrative organization (SAO) Yang Piang (องค์การบริหารส่วนตำบลยางเปียง).
