= Khun Yuam district =

Khun Yuam ขุนยวม
- District
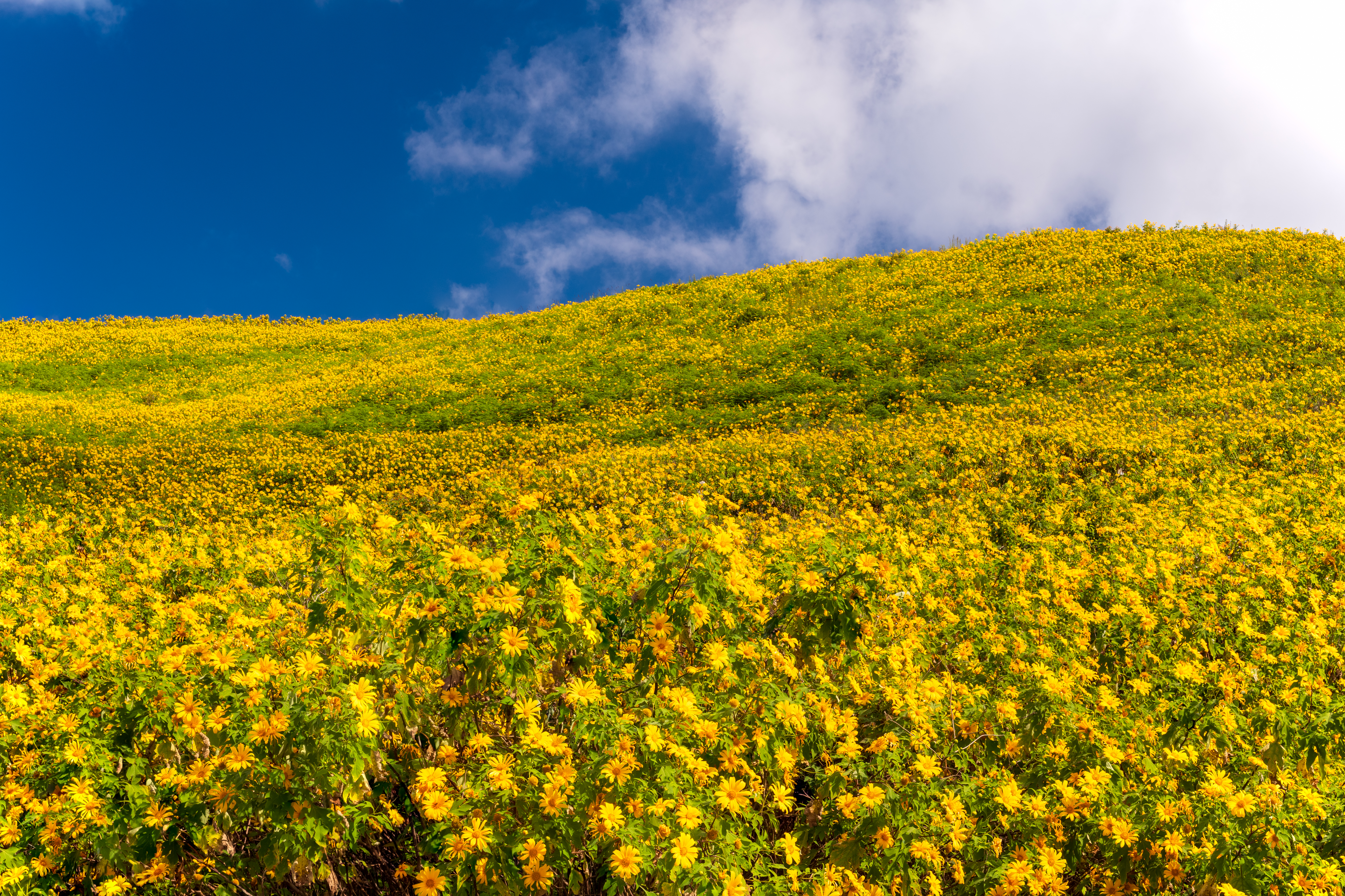
- Tree marigold fields in Doi Mae Ukho, Khun Yuam

- District location in Mae Hong Son province
- Coordinates: 18°50′22″N 97°57′5″E
- Country: Thailand
- Province: Mae Hong Son

Area
  - Total: 1,698.3 km^{2} (655.7 sq mi)

Population (2005)
  - Total: 21,479
  - Density: 12.6/km^{2} (33/sq mi)
- Time zone: UTC+7 (ICT)
- Postal code: 58140
- Geocode: 5802

Khun Yuam (Thai: ขุนยวม, pronounced [kʰǔn jūam]; Northern Thai: ᨡᩩᩁᨿ᩠ᩅᨾ, pronounced [kʰǔn ɲūam]) is a district (amphoe) of Mae Hong Son province, northern Thailand.

== History ==
Mueang Khun Yuam was made a district (amphoe) in 1910. Khun Det Pracharak (ขุนเดชประชารักษ์) was the first head of district.

== Geography ==
Neighboring districts are (from north clockwise): Mueang Mae Hong Son of Mae Hong Son Province, Mae Chaem of Chiang Mai province, Mae La Noi of Mae Hong Son Province, and Kayah State of Myanmar.

The Yuam River and the Mae Surin Waterfall in Namtok Mae Surin National Park are in the district.

== Administration ==
The district is divided into six sub-districts (tambons), which are further subdivided into 45 villages (mubans). Khun Yuam is also a township (thesaban tambon) covering parts of tambon Khun Yuan. There are a further four tambon administrative organizations (TAO) and two tambon administrations (TA).

No.	Name	Thai name	Villages	Pop.
1.	Khun Yuam	ขุนยวม	6	6,823
2.	Mae Ngao	แม่เงา	10	3,068
3.	Mueang Pon	เมืองปอน	10	4,437
4.	Mae Yuam Noi	แม่ยวมน้อย	8	2,464
5.	Mae Ki	แม่กิ๊	5	1,404
6.	Mae Ukho	แม่อูคอ	6	3,283
