= Doi Tao subdistrict =

Coordinates: 17°57′N 98°41′E

Doi Tao ดอยเต่า
- Tambon
- Interactive map of Doi Tao
- Country: Thailand
- Province: Chiang Mai
- District: Doi Tao

Population (2005)
  - Total: 6,790
- Time zone: UTC+7 (ICT)

Doi Tao (Thai: ดอยเต่า) is a tambon (subdistrict) of Doi Tao District, in Chiang Mai Province, Thailand. In 2005, it had a population of 6,790. The tambon contains 10 villages.
