= Mae Ki =

Coordinates: 18.8391°N 97.9520°E

Mae Ki แม่กิ๊
- Subdistrict
- Interactive map of Mae Ki
- Country: Thailand
- Province: Mae Hong Son
- District: Khun Yuam

Population (2005)
  - Total: 1,404
- Time zone: UTC+7 (ICT)

Mae Ki (Thai: แม่กิ๊) is a village and tambon (sub-district) of Khun Yuam District, in Mae Hong Son Province, Thailand. In 2005 it had a population of 1,404 people. The tambon contains five villages.
