= Phaya Mengrai district =

District of Thailand

Phaya Mengrai พญาเม็งราย
- District
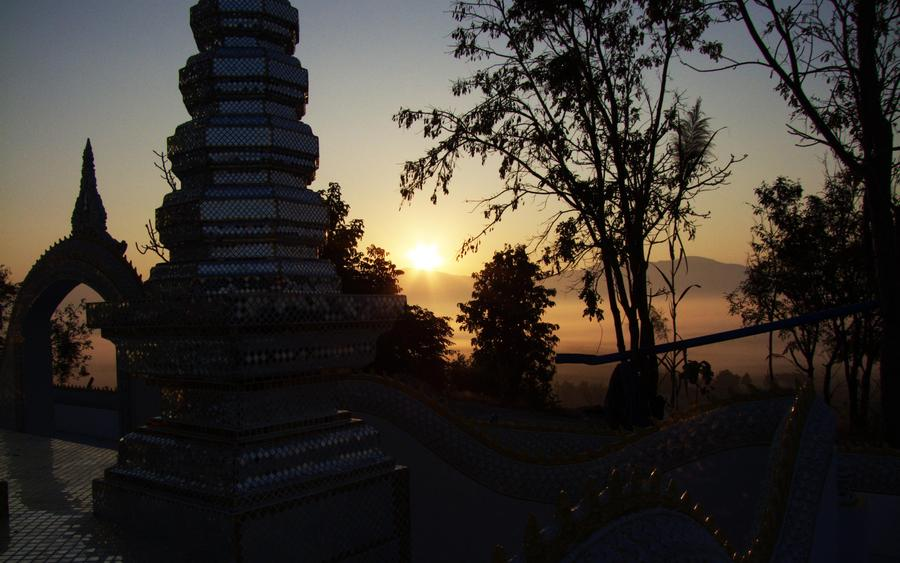
- Chedi, Phaya Mengrai

- District location in Chiang Rai province
- Coordinates: 19°50′56″N 100°9′13″E
- Country: Thailand
- Province: Chiang Rai
- Seat: Mengrai

Area
  - Total: 620.0 km^{2} (239.4 sq mi)

Population (2005)
  - Total: 41,972
  - Density: 67.7/km^{2} (175/sq mi)
- Time zone: UTC+7 (ICT)
- Postal code: 57290
- Geocode: 5712

Phaya Mengrai (Thai: พญาเม็งราย, pronounced [pʰā.jāː mēŋ.rāːj]; Northern Thai: ᨻᩕ᩠ᨿᩣᨾᩢ᩠ᨦᩁᩣ᩠ᨿ, pronounced [pʰā.ɲāː māŋ.hāːj]) is a district (amphoe) of Chiang Rai province, northern Thailand.

== Geography ==
Neighboring districts are (from the west clockwise): Wiang Chai, Wiang Chiang Rung, Chiang Khong, Khun Tan and Thoeng of Chiang Rai Province.

== History ==
The minor district (king amphoe) was created on 5 May 1981, when the three tambons Mae Pao, Mae Tam, and Mai Ya were split off from Thoeng district. It was upgraded to a full district on 12 August 1987.

== Etymology ==
The district is named after King Mengrai, the founder of the Lanna kingdom of northern Thailand.

== Economy ==
Tambon Phay Mengrai is the site of a 2,700 rai Cavindish banana plantation owned and operated by the Chinese firm, Hongta International, a major local employer. The Cavendish banana is controversial as its cultivation requires the intensive use of chemical pesticides to yield harvests for export. The Mekong-Lanna nature conservation network has accused the Chinese plantation of heavy use of pesticides and excessive water takings from Mae Ing Creek. These charges are as yet unsubstantiated (2016).

== Administration ==
The district is divided into five sub-districts (tambons), which are further subdivided into 69 villages (mubans). Phaya Mengrai is a township (thesaban tambon) which covers parts of tambons Mengrai and Mae Pao. There are a further five tambon administrative organizations (TAO).

No.	Name	Thai name	Villages	Pop.
1.	Mae Pao	แม่เปา	19	11,302
2.	Mae Tam	แม่ต๋ำ	11	5,026
3.	Mai Ya	ไม้ยา	17	11,069
4.	Mengrai	เม็งราย	14	9,899
5.	Tat Khwan	ตาดควัน	8	4,676
