= Omkoi subdistrict =

Coordinates: 17°48′N 98°22′E

Omkoi อมก๋อย
- Tambon
- Interactive map of Omkoi
- Country: Thailand
- Province: Chiang Mai
- District: Omkoi

Population (2017)
  - Total: 18,202
- Time zone: UTC+7 (ICT)
- Postal code: 50310
- TIS 1099: 501801

Omkoi subdistrict (Thai: อมก๋อย) is a tambon (subdistrict) of Omkoi District, in Chiang Mai Province, Thailand. In 2017 it had a population of 18,202 people.

== Administration ==
=== Central administration ===
The tambon is divided into 20 administrative villages (mubans).

| No. | Name | Thai |
|---|---|---|
| 1. | Ban Lim-Dong | บ้านหลิม-ดง |
| 2. | Ban Yang Pao | บ้านยางเปา |
| 3. | Ban Thung Cham Roen | บ้านทุ่งจำเริญ |
| 4. | Ban Tung Loi | บ้านตุงลอย |
| 5. | Ban Mae Tom | บ้านแม่ต๋อม |
| 6. | Ban Mae Ang Khang | บ้านแม่อ่างขาง |
| 7. | Ban Pha Pun | บ้านผาปูน |
| 8. | Ban Yong Kue | บ้านยองกือ |
| 9. | Ban Dong | บ้านดง |
| 10. | Ban Yang Kaeo | บ้านยางแก้ว |
| 11. | Ban Tung Ting | บ้านตุงติง |
| 12. | Ban Ka Bo Din | บ้านกะเบอะดิน |
| 13. | Ban Mae Tom Bon | บ้านแม่ต๋อมบน |
| 14. | Ban Yang Pao Nuea | บ้านยางเปาเหนือ |
| 15. | Ban Yong Lae | บ้านยองแหละ |
| 16. | Ban Pha Pu Dong | บ้านผาปูนดง |
| 17. | Ban Mae Ramit Luang | บ้านแม่ระมีดหลวง |
| 18. | Ban Sabom Haet | บ้านสบอมแฮด |
| 19. | Ban Ma Hin Luang | บ้านมะหินหลวง |
| 20. | Ban Khun | บ้านขุน |

=== Local administration ===
The area of the subdistrict is governed by two local governments.

- Subdistrict municipality (thesaban tambon) Omkoi (เทศบาลตำบลอมก๋อย)
- subdistrict administrative organization (SAO) Omkoi (องค์การบริหารส่วนตำบลอมก๋อย)
