= Mae Tuen, Chiang Mai =

Mae Tuen แม่ตื่น
- Tambon
- Interactive map of Mae Tuen
- Country: Thailand
- Province: Chiang Mai
- District: Omkoi

Population (2017)
  - Total: 10,521
- Time zone: UTC+7 (ICT)
- Postal code: 50310
- TIS 1099: 501803

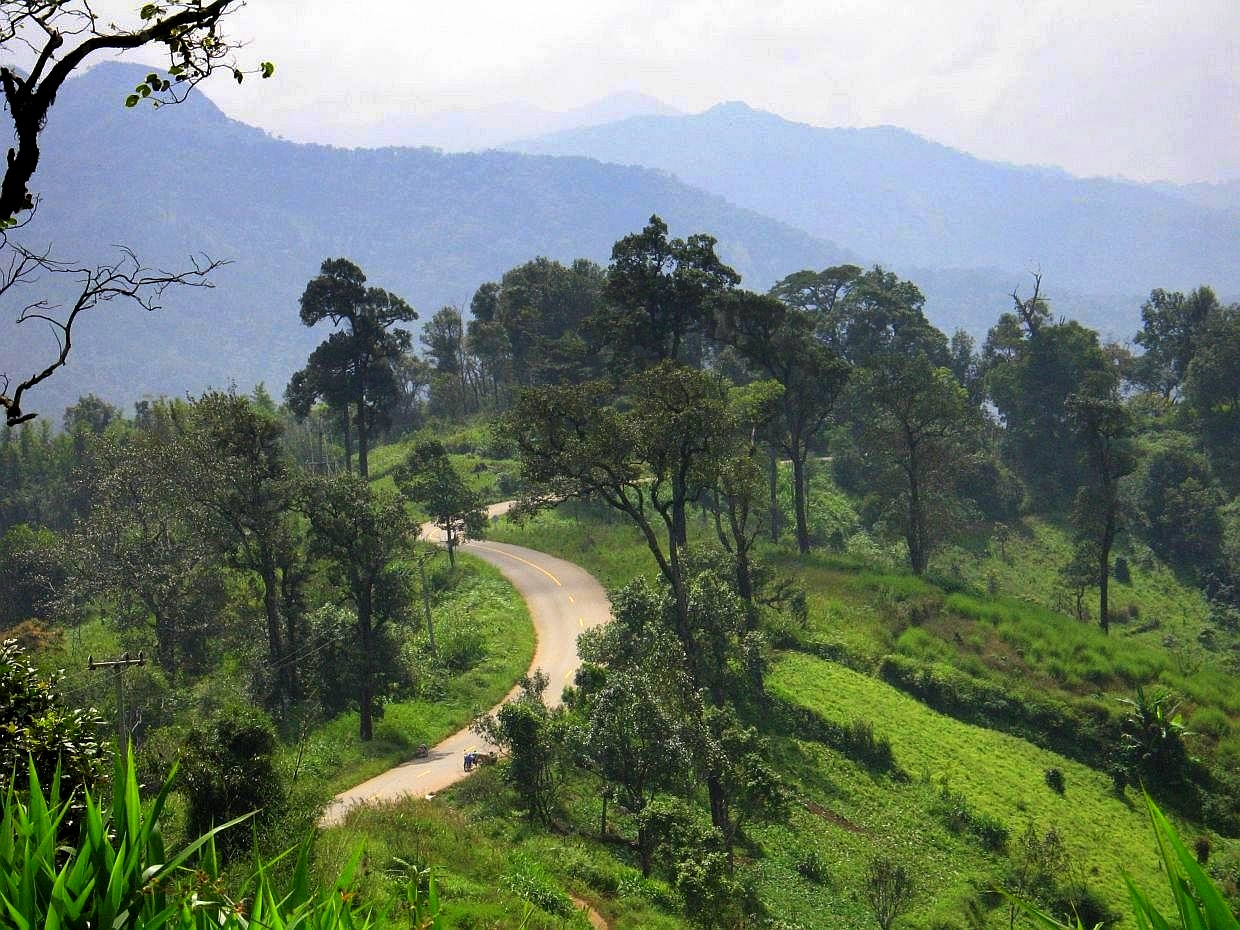

Mae Tuen (Thai: แม่ตื่น) is a tambon (subdistrict) of Omkoi District, in Chiang Mai Province, Thailand. In 2017 it had a population of 10,521 people.

== Administration ==
=== Central administration ===
The tambon is divided into 16 administrative villages (mubans).

No.	Name	Thai
1.	Ban Luang	บ้านหลวง
2.	Ban Mai	บ้านใหม่
3.	Ban Pa Kha	บ้านป่าคา
4.	Ban San Ton Pin	บ้านสันต้นปิน
5.	Ban Huai Lo Duk	บ้านห้วยหล่อดูก
6.	Ban Khun Mae Tuen Noi	บ้านขุนแม่ตื่นน้อย
7.	Ban Mae Thoei	บ้านแม่เทย
8.	Ban Huai Yap	บ้านห้วยยาบ
9.	Ban Mae Ra-a Nai	บ้านแม่ระอาใน
10.	Ban Mae Ra-a Nok	บ้านแม่ระอานอก
11.	Ban Thung Ton Ngio	บ้านทุ่งต้นงิ้ว
12.	Ban Maeo Mae Thoei	บ้านแม้วแม่เทย
13.	Ban Piyotha	บ้านปิยอทะ
14.	Ban Huai Kai Pa	บ้านห้วยไก่ป่า
15.	Ban Borako	บ้านบราโก
16.	Ban Huai Din Mo	บ้านห้วยดินหม้อ

=== Local administration ===
The area of the subdistrict is covered by the subdistrict administrative organization (SAO) Mae Tuen (องค์การบริหารส่วนตำบลแม่ตื่น).
