= Muang Kham, Chiang Rai =

Coordinates: 19.5008°N 99.7466°E

Muang Kham ม่วงคำ
- Tambon
- Interactive map of Muang Kham
- Country: Thailand
- Province: Chiang Rai
- Amphoe: Phan

Population (2005)
  - Total: 8,837
- Time zone: UTC+7 (Thailand)

Muang Kham (Thai: ม่วงคำ) is a village and tambon (subdistrict) of Phan District, in Chiang Rai Province, Thailand. In 2005 it had a total population of 8837 people. The tambon contains 17 villages.
