= Mae Suai subdistrict =

Coordinates: 19.6607°N 99.5351°E

Mae Suai
- Tambon
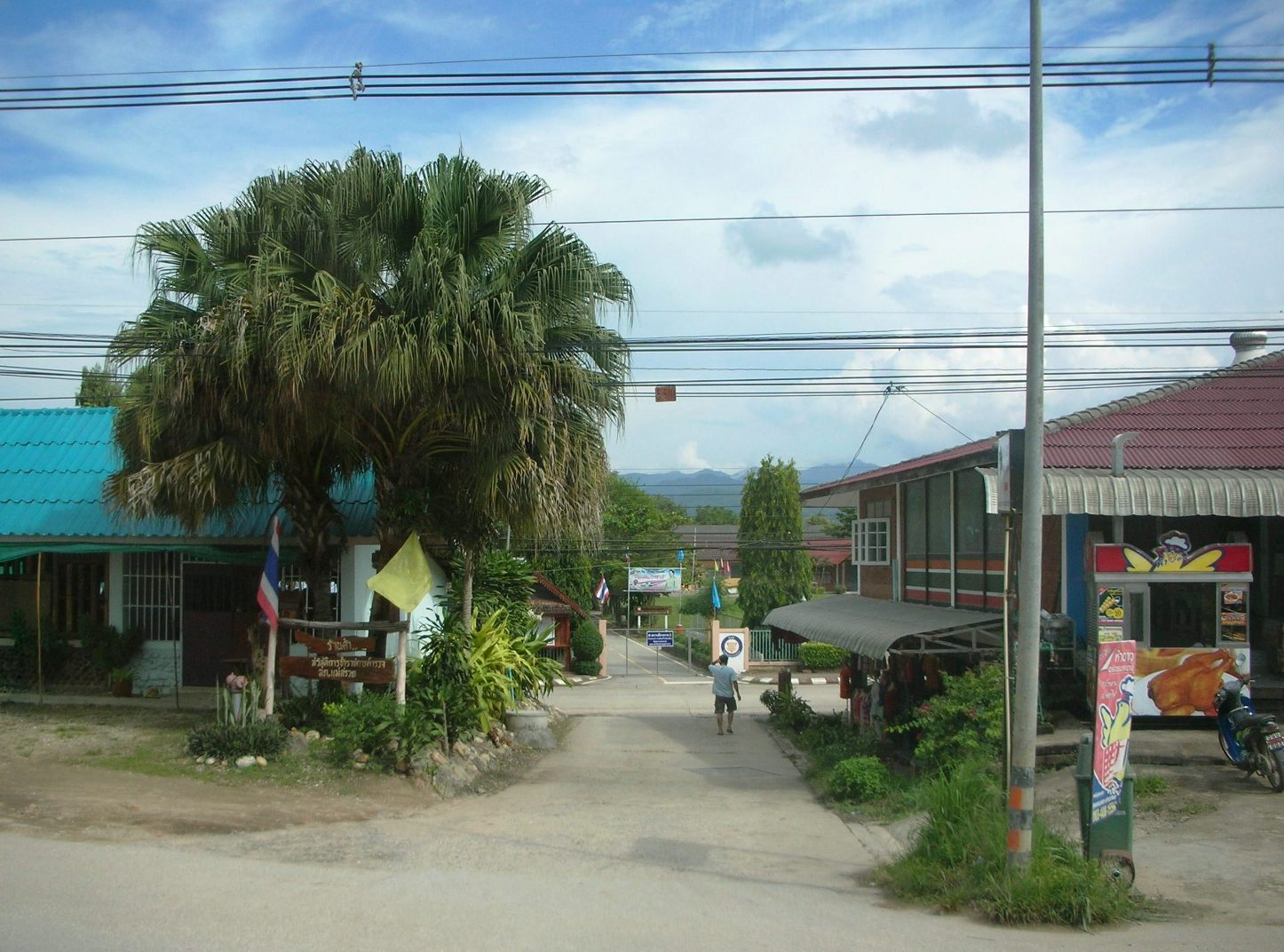
- Interactive map of Mae Suai
- Country: Thailand
- Province: Chiang Rai
- District: Mae Suai

Population (2005)
  - Total: 9,058
- Time zone: UTC+7 (ICT)

Mae Suai (Thai: แม่สรวย; Thai pronunciation: [mɛ̂ː sǔaj]) is a village and tambon (subdistrict) of Mae Suai District, in Chiang Rai Province, Thailand. In 2005 it had a population of 9,058 people. The tambon contains 17 villages.
