= Doi Tao district =

Doi Tao ดอยเต่า
- District
- District location in Chiang Mai province
- Coordinates: 17°57′13″N 98°41′6″E
- Country: Thailand
- Province: Chiang Mai
- Seat: Tha Duea

Area
  - Total: 803.9 km^{2} (310.4 sq mi)

Population (2005)
  - Total: 27,284
  - Density: 33.9/km^{2} (88/sq mi)
- Time zone: UTC+7 (ICT)
- Postal code: 50260
- Geocode: 5017

Doi Tao (Thai: ดอยเต่า, pronounced [dɔ̄ːj tàw]) is a district (amphoe) in the southern part of Chiang Mai province in northern Thailand.

== Geography ==
Neighboring districts are (from the west clockwise) Om Koi, Hot of Chiang Mai Province, Li of Lamphun province and Sam Ngao of Tak province.

The south end of the Khun Tan Range reaches the east side of this district.

== History ==
The minor district (king amphoe) was established on 16 October 1972 by splitting off the four tambons Tha Duea, Doi Tao, Muet Ka, and Ban Aen from Hot district. It was upgraded to a full district on 25 March 1979.

== Administration ==
The district is divided into six sub-districts (tambons), which are further subdivided into 42 villages (muban). Tha Duea is a township (thesaban tambon) which covers parts of tambons Tha Duea and Mueat Ka. There are a further five tambon administrative organizations (TAO).

| No. | Name | Thai name | Villages | Pop. |
|---|---|---|---|---|
| 1. | Doi Tao | ดอยเต่า | 10 | 6,790 |
| 2. | Tha Duea | ท่าเดื่อ | 6 | 3,242 |
| 3. | Muet Ka | มืดกา | 5 | 3,363 |
| 4. | Ban Aen | บ้านแอ่น | 4 | 2,804 |
| 5. | Bong Tan | บงตัน | 6 | 4,678 |
| 6. | Pong Thung | โปงทุ่ง | 11 | 6,407 |
