= Mengrai subdistrict =

Mengrai
- Tambon
- Interactive map of Mengrai
- Country: Thailand
- Province: Chiang Rai
- District: Phaya Mengrai

Population (2005)
  - Total: 9,899
- Time zone: UTC+7 (ICT)

Mengrai Subdistrict (Thai: เม็งราย) is a village and tambon (subdistrict) of Phaya Mengrai District, in Chiang Rai Province, Thailand. In 2005 it had a population of 9899 people. The tambon contains 14 villages.
