= Si Thoi, Phayao =

Coordinates: 19.3701°N 99.7936°E

Si Thoi ศรีถ้อย
- Subdistrict
- Interactive map of Si Thoi
- Country: Thailand
- Province: Phayao
- District: Mae Chai

Population (2014)
  - Total: 7,038
- Time zone: UTC+7 (ICT)
- Postal code: 56130
- TIS 1099: 560702

Si Thoi, Phayao (Thai: ศรีถ้อย, pronounced [sǐː tʰɔ̂j]) is a tambon (subdistrict) of Mae Chai District, in Phayao Province, Thailand. In 2014 it had a population of 7,038 people.

== Administration ==
=== Central administration ===
The tambon is divided into 13 administrative villages (mubans).

No.	Name	Thai
1.	Ban Ton Kae	บ้านต้นแก
2.	Ban Ton Takhian	บ้านต้นตะเคียน
3.	Ban San Khwang	บ้านสันขวาง
4.	Ban Mae Chai Hang Ban	บ้านแม่ใจหางบ้าน
5.	Ban Pa Sak	บ้านป่าสัก
6.	Ban Thung Pa Kha	บ้านทุ่งป่าข่า
7.	Ban Khua Tat	บ้านขัวตาด
8.	Ban Tha Ton Hat	บ้านท่าต้นหาด
9.	Ban Santi Suk	บ้านสันติสุข
10.	Ban Pha Daeng	บ้านผาแดง
11.	Ban Ton Phueng	บ้านต้นผึ้ง
12.	Ban Pa Sak Samakkhi	บ้านป่าสักสามัคคี
13.	Ban Pang Pu Lo	บ้านปางปูเลาะ

=== Local administration ===
The area of the subdistrict is shared by two local governments.

- the subdistrict municipality (thesaban tambon) Mae Chai (เทศบาลตำบลแม่ใจ)
- the subdistrict municipality (thesaban tambon) Si Thoi (เทศบาลตำบลศรีถ้อย)
