= Omkoi district =

Omkoi อมก๋อย
- District
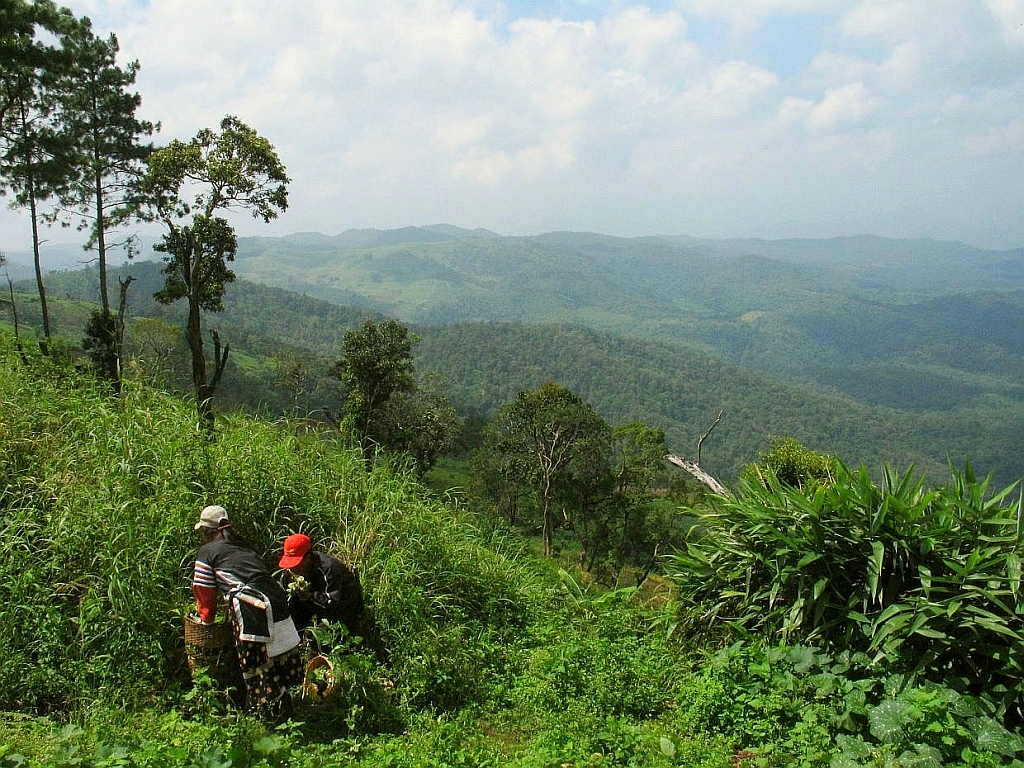
- Lahu farmers in the mountains of Omkoi

- District location in Chiang Mai province
- Coordinates: 17°48′4″N 98°21′31″E
- Country: Thailand
- Province: Chiang Mai

Area
  - Total: 2,093.8 km^{2} (808.4 sq mi)

Population (2005)
  - Total: 54,568
  - Density: 26.1/km^{2} (68/sq mi)
- Time zone: UTC+7 (ICT)
- Postal code: 50310
- Geocode: 5018

Omkoi (Thai: อมก๋อย, pronounced [ʔōm.kɔ̌j]) is the southwesternmost district (amphoe) of Chiang Mai province in northern Thailand.

== Geography ==
Neighboring districts are (from the north clockwise) Hot and Doi Tao of Chiang Mai Province, Sam Ngao, Mae Ramat, and Tha Song Yang of Tak province and Sop Moei of Mae Hong Son province. The Thanon Thongchai Range dominates the landscape.

== History ==
The minor district (king amphoe) was established on 19 April 1929 as a subordinate of Hot district, consisting of the three sub-districts Omkoi, Yang Piang, and Mae Tuen. It was upgraded to a full district on 23 July 1958.

== Administration ==
The district is divided into six sub-districts (tambon), which are further subdivided into 95 villages (muban). Omkoi is a sub-district municipality (thesaban tambon) which covers parts of the tambon Omkoi. There are further six tambon administrative organizations (TAO).

| No. | Name | Thai name | Villages | Pop. |
|---|---|---|---|---|
| 1. | Omkoi | อมก๋อย | 20 | 17,208 |
| 2. | Yang Piang | ยางเปียง | 17 | 7,990 |
| 3. | Mae Tuen | แม่ตื่น | 16 | 9,180 |
| 4. | Mon Chong | ม่อนจอง | 9 | 6,008 |
| 5. | Mae Long | แม่หลอง | 12 | 6,285 |
| 6. | Na Kian | นาเกียน | 21 | 7,897 |

== Gallery ==
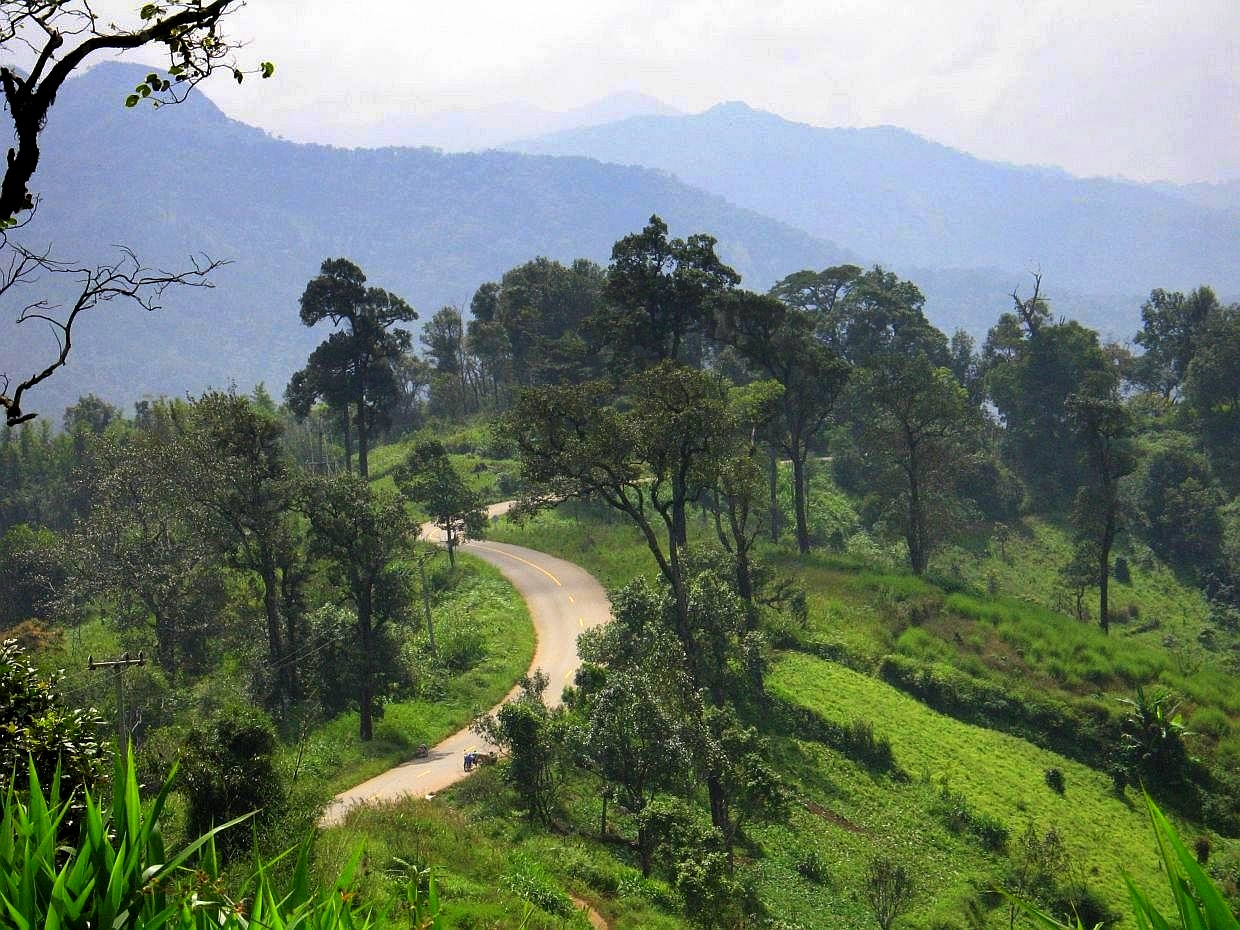
Rte 1099 ends in the jungle at Mae Thun Noi, Omkoi
