= Mae Yen =

Mae Yen แม่เย็น
- Tambon
- Interactive map of Mae Yen
- Country: Thailand
- Province: Chiang Rai
- Amphoe: Phan

Population (2016)
  - Total: 5,429
- Time zone: UTC+7 (TST)
- Postal code: 57280
- TIS 1099: 570512

Mae Yen (Thai: แม่เย็น) is a tambon (subdistrict) of Phan District, in Chiang Rai Province, Thailand. In 2016 it had a total population of 5,429 people.

== Administration ==
=== Central administration ===
The tambon is subdivided into 11 administrative villages (muban).

No.	Name	Thai
1.	Ban Pu Kaeng	บ้านปูแกง
2.	Ban San Kong	บ้านสันกอง
3.	Ban Mae Yen	บ้านแม่เย็น
4.	Ban Pa Sak Nuea	บ้านป่าสักเหนือ
5.	Ban Mae Yen Klang	บ้านแม่เย็นกลาง
6.	Ban San Mai Ham	บ้านสันไม้ฮาม
7.	Ban San Ton Nae	บ้านสันต้นแหน
8.	Ban Don Nam Lom	บ้านดงน้ำล้อม
9.	Ban Suk Santi	บ้านสุขสันติ
10.	Ban Ing Doi	บ้านอิงดอย
11.	Ban Dong Don Tao	บ้านดงดอนเต้า

=== Local administration ===
The whole area of the subdistrict is covered by the subdistrict administrative organization (SAO) Mae Yen (องค์การบริหารส่วนตำบลแม่เย็น).
