= Ban Chan, Chiang Mai =

Ban Chan บ้านจันทร์
- Tambon
- Interactive map of Ban Chan
- Coordinates: 19°4′38″N 98°18′17″E
- Country: Thailand
- Province: Chiang Mai
- District: Galyani Vadhana

Population (2012)
  - Total: 4,007
- Time zone: UTC+7 (ICT)

Ban Chan (Thai: บ้านจันทร์) is a tambon (subdistrict) of Galyani Vadhana District, in Chiang Mai Province, Thailand. In 2012, it had a population of 4,007 people.

== Administration ==
The subdistrict is divided into seven administrative villages. The Ban Chan subdistrict administrative organization is the local government responsible for the subdistrict area.

No.	Name	Thai
1.	Ban Huai Hom	บ้านห้วยฮ่อม
2.	Ban San Muang	บ้านสันม่วง
3.	Ban Wat Chan	บ้านวัดจันทร์
4.	Ban Nong Chet Nuai	บ้านหนองเจ็ดหน่วย
5.	Ban Chaem Noi	บ้านแจ่มน้อย
6.	Ban Nong Daeng	บ้านหนองแดง
7.	Ban Den	บ้านเด่น
