= List of tambon in Thailand (W) =

This is a list of tambon (sub-districts) in Thailand, beginning with the letter W. This information is liable to change due to border changes or re-allocation of Tambons. Missing Tambon numbers show where the number is either not used or the Tambon has been transferred to a different Amphoe.

Tambon	ตำบล	Amphoe	อำเภอ	Changwat (Province)	จังหวัด	Region
Wa Tabaek	วะตะแบก	Thep Sathit	เทพสถิต	Chaiyaphum	ชัยภูมิ	North-East
Wa Thong	หว้าทอง	Phu Wiang	ภูเวียง	Khon Kaen	ขอนแก่น	North-East
Wa Yai	วาใหญ่	Akat Amnuai	อากาศอำนวย	Sakon Nakhon	สกลนคร	North-East
Wachiraphayaban	วชิรพยาบาล	Khet Dusit	ดุสิต	Bangkok	กรุงเทพมหานคร	Central
Waeng	แวง	Phon Thong	โพนทอง	Roi Et	ร้อยเอ็ด	North-East
Waeng	แว้ง	Waeng	แว้ง	Narathiwat	นราธิวาส	South
Waeng	แวง	Sawang Daen Din	สว่างแดนดิน	Sakon Nakhon	สกลนคร	North-East
Waeng Dong	แวงดง	Yang Sisurat	ยางสีสุราช	Maha Sarakham	มหาสารคาม	North-East
Waeng Nang	แวงน่าง	Mueang Maha Sarakham	เมืองมหาสารคาม	Maha Sarakham	มหาสารคาม	North-East
Waeng Noi	แวงน้อย	Waeng Noi	แวงน้อย	Khon Kaen	ขอนแก่น	North-East
Waeng Yai	แวงใหญ่	Waeng Yai	แวงใหญ่	Khon Kaen	ขอนแก่น	North-East
Wai Niao	หวายเหนียว	Tha Maka	ท่ามะกา	Kanchanaburi	กาญจนบุรี	West
Wale	วาเล่ย์	Phop Phra	พบพระ	Tak	ตาก	West
Wan Dao	วันดาว	Pak Tho	ปากท่อ	Ratchaburi	ราชบุรี	West
Wan Kham	หว้านคำ	Rasi Salai	ราษีไศล	Sisaket	ศรีสะเกษ	North-East
Wan Yai	หว้านใหญ่	Wan Yai	หว้านใหญ่	Mukdahan	มุกดาหาร	North-East
Wan Yao	วันยาว	Khlung	ขลุง	Chanthaburi	จันทบุรี	East
Wang	วัง	Tha Chana	ท่าชนะ	Surat Thani	สุราษฎร์ธานี	South
Wang Ang	วังอ่าง	Cha-uat	ชะอวด	Nakhon Si Thammarat	นครศรีธรรมราช	South
Wang Ban	วังบาล	Lom Kao	หล่มเก่า	Phetchabun	เพชรบูรณ์	Central
Wang Bo	วังบ่อ	Nong Bua	หนองบัว	Nakhon Sawan	นครสวรรค์	Central
Wang Bot	วังโบสถ์	Nong Phai	หนองไผ่	Phetchabun	เพชรบูรณ์	Central
Wang Bua	วังบัว	Khlong Khlung	คลองขลุง	Kamphaeng Phet	กำแพงเพชร	Central
Wang Burapha Phirom	วังบูรพาภิรมย์	Khet Phra Nakhon	พระนคร	Bangkok	กรุงเทพมหานคร	Central
Wang Cha-on	วังชะโอน	Bueng Samakkhi	บึงสามัคคี	Kamphaeng Phet	กำแพงเพชร	Central
Wang Chai	วังชัย	Nam Phong	น้ำพอง	Khon Kaen	ขอนแก่น	North-East
Wang Chai	วังไชย	Borabue	บรบือ	Maha Sarakham	มหาสารคาม	North-East
Wang Chan	วังจั่น	Khok Samrong	โคกสำโรง	Lopburi	ลพบุรี	Central
Wang Chan	วังจันทร์	Wang Chan	วังจันทร์	Rayong	ระยอง	East
Wang Chan	วังจันทร์	Kaeng Krachan	แก่งกระจาน	Phetchaburi	เพชรบุรี	West
Wang Chan	วังจันทร์	Sam Ngao	สามเงา	Tak	ตาก	West
Wang Chaphlu	วังชะพลู	Khanu Woralaksaburi	ขาณุวรลักษบุรี	Kamphaeng Phet	กำแพงเพชร	Central
Wang Chik	วังจิก	Pho Prathap Chang	โพธิ์ประทับช้าง	Phichit	พิจิตร	Central
Wang Chin	วังชิ้น	Wang Chin	วังชิ้น	Phrae	แพร่	North
Wang Chomphu	วังชมภู	Nong Bua Daeng	หนองบัวแดง	Chaiyaphum	ชัยภูมิ	North-East
Wang Chomphu	วังชมภู	Mueang Phetchabun	เมืองเพชรบูรณ์	Phetchabun	เพชรบูรณ์	Central
Wang Chomphu	วังชมภู	Phon Charoen	พรเจริญ	Bueng Kan	บึงกาฬ	North-East
Wang Chomphu	วังชมภู	Phon Charoen	พรเจริญ	Nong Khai	หนองคาย	North-East
Wang Chula	วังจุฬา	Wang Noi	วังน้อย	Phra Nakhon Si Ayutthaya	พระนครศรีอยุธยา	Central
Wang Daeng	วังแดง	Tha Ruea	ท่าเรือ	Phra Nakhon Si Ayutthaya	พระนครศรีอยุธยา	Central
Wang Daeng	วังแดง	Tron	ตรอน	Uttaradit	อุตรดิตถ์	North
Wang Dan	วังดาล	Kabin Buri	กบินทร์บุรี	Prachin Buri	ปราจีนบุรี	East
Wang Din	วังดิน	Mueang Uttaradit	เมืองอุตรดิตถ์	Uttaradit	อุตรดิตถ์	North
Wang Dong	วังด้ง	Mueang Kanchanaburi	เมืองกาญจนบุรี	Kanchanaburi	กาญจนบุรี	West
Wang Hamhae	วังหามแห	Khanu Woralaksaburi	ขาณุวรลักษบุรี	Kamphaeng Phet	กำแพงเพชร	Central
Wang Hin	วังหิน	Nong Song Hong	หนองสองห้อง	Khon Kaen	ขอนแก่น	North-East
Wang Hin	วังหิน	Bang Khan	บางขัน	Nakhon Si Thammarat	นครศรีธรรมราช	South
Wang Hin	วังหิน	Non Daeng	โนนแดง	Nakhon Ratchasima	นครราชสีมา	North-East
Wang Hin	วังหิน	Wang Pong	วังโป่ง	Phetchabun	เพชรบูรณ์	Central
Wang Hin	วังหิน	Ban Rai	บ้านไร่	Uthai Thani	อุทัยธานี	Central
Wang Hin	วังหิน	Mueang Chan	เมืองจันทร์	Sisaket	ศรีสะเกษ	North-East
Wang Hin	วังหิน	Wang Hin	วังหิน	Sisaket	ศรีสะเกษ	North-East
Wang Hin	วังหิน	Mueang Tak	เมืองตาก	Tak	ตาก	West
Wang Hin Lat	วังหินลาด	Chum Phae	ชุมแพ	Khon Kaen	ขอนแก่น	North-East
Wang Hong	วังหงส์	Mueang Phrae	เมืองแพร่	Phrae	แพร่	North
Wang Ithok	วังอิทก	Bang Rakam	บางระกำ	Phitsanulok	พิษณุโลก	Central
Wang Kaeo	วังแก้ว	Wang Nuea	วังเหนือ	Lampang	ลำปาง	North
Wang Kai Thuean	วังไก่เถื่อน	Hankha	หันคา	Chai Nat	ชัยนาท	Central
Wang Kaphi	วังกะพี้	Mueang Uttaradit	เมืองอุตรดิตถ์	Uttaradit	อุตรดิตถ์	North
Wang Katha	วังกะทะ	Pak Chong	ปากช่อง	Nakhon Ratchasima	นครราชสีมา	North-East
Wang Khaem	วังแขม	Khlong Khlung	ขลุง คลองขลุง	Kamphaeng Phet	กำแพงเพชร	Central
Wang Khan	วังคัน	Dan Chang	ด่านช้าง	Suphan Buri	สุพรรณบุรี	Central
Wang Khanai	วังขนาย	Tha Muang	ท่าม่วง	Kanchanaburi	กาญจนบุรี	West
Wang Khiri	วังคีรี	Huai Yot	ห้วยยอด	Trang	ตรัง	South
Wang Khoi	วังข่อย	Phaisali	ไพศาลี	Nakhon Sawan	นครสวรรค์	Central
Wang Khon Khwang	วังขอนขว้าง	Khok Samrong	โคกสำโรง	Lopburi	ลพบุรี	Central
Wang Khrai	วังไคร้	Tha Yang	ท่ายาง	Phetchaburi	เพชรบุรี	West
Wang Khuang	วังควง	Phran Kratai	พรานกระต่าย	Kamphaeng Phet	กำแพงเพชร	Central
Wang Krachae	วังกระแจะ	Sai Yok	ไทรโยค	Kanchanaburi	กาญจนบุรี	West
Wang Krachae	วังกระแจะ	Mueang Trat	เมืองตราด	Trat	ตราด	East
Wang Krachom	วังกระโจม	Mueang Nakhon Nayok	เมืองนครนายก	Nakhon Nayok	นครนายก	Central
Wang Krot	วังกรด	Bang Mun Nak	บางมูลนาก	Phichit	พิจิตร	Central
Wang Kwang	วังกวาง	Nam Nao	น้ำหนาว	Phetchabun	เพชรบูรณ์	Central
Wang Luang	วังหลวง	Fao Rai	เฝ้าไร่	Nong Khai	หนองคาย	North-East
Wang Luang	วังหลวง	Nong Muang Khai	หนองม่วงไข่	Phrae	แพร่	North
Wang Luang	วังหลวง	Selaphum	เสลภูมิ	Roi Et	ร้อยเอ็ด	North-East
Wang Luek	วังลึก	Sam Chuk	สามชุก	Suphan Buri	สุพรรณบุรี	Central
Wang Luek	วังลึก	Si Samrong	ศรีสำโรง	Sukhothai	สุโขทัย	Central
Wang Luek	วังลึก	Si Samrong	ศรีสำโรง	Sukhothai	สุโขทัย	Central
Wang Luek	วังลึก	Ban Dan Lan Hoi	บ้านด่านลานหอย	Sukhothai	สุโขทัย	Central
Wang Lum	วังหลุม	Taphan Hin	ตะพานหิน	Phichit	พิจิตร	Central
Wang Ma	วังม้า	Lat Yao	ลาดยาว	Nakhon Sawan	นครสวรรค์	Central
Wang Mahakon	วังมหากร	Tha Tako	ท่าตะโก	Nakhon Sawan	นครสวรรค์	Central
Wang Mai	วังใหม่	Khet Pathum Wan	ปทุมวัน	Bangkok	กรุงเทพมหานคร	Central
Wang Mai	วังใหม่	Mueang Chumphon	เมืองชุมพร	Chumphon	ชุมพร	South
Wang Mai	วังใหม่	Borabue	บรบือ	Maha Sarakham	มหาสารคาม	North-East
Wang Mai	วังใหม่	Wang Sombun	วังสมบูรณ์	Sa Kaeo	สระแก้ว	East
Wang Mai	วังใหม่	Na Yai Am	นายายอาม	Chanthaburi	จันทบุรี	East
Wang Mai	วังใหม่	Pa Bon	ป่าบอน	Phatthalung	พัทลุง	South
Wang Mai Daeng	วังไม้แดง	Prathai	ประทาย	Nakhon Ratchasima	นครราชสีมา	North-East
Wang Mai Khon	วังไม้ขอน	Sawankhalok	สวรรคโลก	Sukhothai	สุโขทัย	Central
Wang Man	วังหมัน	Wat Sing	วัดสิงห์	Chai Nat	ชัยนาท	Central
Wang Man	วังหมัน	Sam Ngao	สามเงา	Tak	ตาก	West
Wang Manao	วังมะนาว	Pak Tho	ปากท่อ	Ratchaburi	ราชบุรี	West
Wang Maprang	วังมะปราง	Wang Wiset	เขาวิเศษ	Trang	ตรัง	South
Wang Maprang Nuea	วังมะปรางเหนือ	Wang Wiset	เขาวิเศษ	Trang	ตรัง	South
Wang Mi	วังหมี	Wang Nam Khiao	วังน้ำเขียว	Nakhon Ratchasima	นครราชสีมา	North-East
Wang Mok	วังโมกข์	Wachirabarami	วชิรบารมี	Phichit	พิจิตร	Central
Wang Muang	วังม่วง	Pueai Noi	เปือยน้อย	Khon Kaen	ขอนแก่น	North-East
Wang Muang	วังม่วง	Wang Muang	วังม่วง	Saraburi	สระบุรี	Central
Wang Mueang	วังเมือง	Lat Yao	ลาดยาว	Nakhon Sawan	นครสวรรค์	Central
Wang Nam Khao	วังน้ำขาว	Ban Dan Lan Hoi	บ้านด่านลานหอย	Sukhothai	สุโขทัย	Central
Wang Nam Khiao	วังน้ำเขียว	Wang Nam Khiao	วังน้ำเขียว	Nakhon Ratchasima	นครราชสีมา	North-East
Wang Nam Khiao	วังน้ำเขียว	Kamphaeng Saen	กำแพงแสน	Nakhon Pathom	นครปฐม	Central
Wang Nam Khu	วังน้ำคู้	Mueang Phitsanulok	เมืองพิษณุโลก	Phitsanulok	พิษณุโลก	Central
Wang Nam Lat	วังน้ำลัด	Phaisali	ไพศาลี	Nakhon Sawan	นครสวรรค์	Central
Wang Nam Sap	วังน้ำซับ	Si Prachan	ศรีประจันต์	Suphan Buri	สุพรรณบุรี	Central
Wang Nam Yen	วังน้ำเย็น	Wang Nam Yen	วังน้ำเย็น	Sa Kaeo	สระแก้ว	East
Wang Nam Yen	วังน้ำเย็น	Bang Pla Ma	บางปลาม้า	Suphan Buri	สุพรรณบุรี	Central
Wang Nam Yen	วังน้ำเย็น	Sawaeng Ha	แสวงหา	Ang Thong	อ่างทอง	Central
Wang Ngio	วังงิ้ว	Dong Charoen	ดงเจริญ	Phichit	พิจิตร	Central
Wang Ngio Tai	วังงิ้วใต้	Dong Charoen	ดงเจริญ	Phichit	พิจิตร	Central
Wang Ngoen	วังเงิน	Mae Tha	แม่ทะ	Lampang	ลำปาง	North
Wang Noi	วังน้อยวังน้อย	Wang Noi	วังน้อย	Phra Nakhon Si Ayutthaya	พระนครศรีอยุธยา	Central
Wang Nok Aen	วังนกแอ่น	Wang Thong	วังทอง	Phitsanulok	พิษณุโลก	Central
Wang Nuea	วังเหนือ	Wang Nuea	วังเหนือ	Lampang	ลำปาง	North
Wang Nuea	วังเหนือ	Ban Dan	บ้านด่าน	Buriram	บุรีรัมย์	North-East
Wang Phai	วังไผ่	Mueang Chumphon	เมืองชุมพร	Chumphon	ชุมพร	South
Wang Phai	วังไผ่	Huai Krachao	ห้วยกระเจา	Kanchanaburi	กาญจนบุรี	West
Wang Phang	วังผาง	Wiang Nong Long	เวียงหนองล่อง	Lamphun	ลำพูน	North
Wang Phatthana	วังพัฒนา	Bang Sai	บางซ้าย	Phra Nakhon Si Ayutthaya	พระนครศรีอยุธยา	Central
Wang Phaya	วังพญา	Raman (Malay: Reman)	รามัน	Yala	ยะลา	South
Wang Phikun	วังพิกุล	Bueng Sam Phan	บึงสามพัน	Phetchabun	เพชรบูรณ์	Central
Wang Phikun	วังพิกุล	Wang Thong	วังทอง	Phitsanulok	พิษณุโลก	Central
Wang Phinphat	วังพิณพาทย์	Sawankhalok	สวรรคโลก	Sukhothai	สุโขทัย	Central
Wang Phloeng	วังเพลิง	Khok Samrong	โคกสำโรง	Lopburi	ลพบุรี	Central
Wang Pho	วังโพธิ์	Ban Lueam	บ้านเหลื่อม	Nakhon Ratchasima	นครราชสีมา	North-East
Wang Phoem	วังเพิ่ม	Si Chomphu	สีชมพู	Khon Kaen	ขอนแก่น	North-East
Wang Phong	วังก์พง	Pran Buri	ปราณบุรี	Prachuap Khiri Khan	ประจวบคีรีขันธ์	West
Wang Phrao	วังพร้าว	Ko Kha	เกาะคา	Lampang	ลำปาง	North
Wang Phrong	วังโพรง	Noen Maprang	เนินมะปราง	Phitsanulok	พิษณุโลก	Central
Wang Pla Pom	วังปลาป้อม	Na Wang	นาวัง	Nong Bua Lamphu	หนองบัวลำภู	North-East
Wang Pong	วังโป่ง	Wang Pong	วังโป่ง	Phetchabun	เพชรบูรณ์	Central
Wang Prachan	วังประจัน	Khuan Don (Malay: Dusun)	ควนโดน	Satun	สตูล	South
Wang Prachop	วังประจบ	Mueang Tak	เมืองตาก	Tak	ตาก	West
Wang Rong Yai	วังโรงใหญ่	Sikhio	สีคิ้ว	Nakhon Ratchasima	นครราชสีมา	North-East
Wang Saem	วังแซ้ม	Makham	มะขาม	Chanthaburi	จันทบุรี	East
Wang Saeng	วังแสง	Kae Dam	แกดำ	Maha Sarakham	มหาสารคาม	North-East
Wang Saeng	วังแสง	Chonnabot	ชนบท	Khon Kaen	ขอนแก่น	North-East
Wang Sai	วังซ้าย	Wang Nuea	วังเหนือ	Lampang	ลำปาง	North
Wang Sai	วังไทร	Pak Chong	ปากช่อง	Nakhon Ratchasima	นครราชสีมา	North-East
Wang Sai	วังไทร	Khlong Khlung	ขลุง คลองขลุง	Kamphaeng Phet	กำแพงเพชร	Central
Wang Sai Kham	วังทรายคำ	Wang Nuea	วังเหนือ	Lampang	ลำปาง	North
Wang Sai Phun	วังทรายพูน	Wang Sai Phun	วังทรายพูน	Phichit	พิจิตร	Central
Wang Sala	วังศาลา	Tha Muang	ท่าม่วง	Kanchanaburi	กาญจนบุรี	West
Wang Sam Mo	วังสามหมอ	Wang Sam Mo	วังสามหมอ	Udon Thani	อุดรธานี	North-East
Wang Samakkhi	วังสามัคคี	Phon Thong	โพนทอง	Roi Et	ร้อยเอ็ด	North-East
Wang Samrong	วังสำโรง	Bang Mun Nak	บางมูลนาก	Phichit	พิจิตร	Central
Wang Samrong	วังสำโรง	Taphan Hin	ตะพานหิน	Phichit	พิจิตร	Central
Wang San	วังซ่าน	Mae Wong	แม่วงก์	Nakhon Sawan	นครสวรรค์	Central
Wang San	วังศาล	Wang Pong	วังโป่ง	Phetchabun	เพชรบูรณ์	Central
Wang Saphung	วังสะพุง	Wang Saphung	วังสะพุง	Loei	เลย	North-East
Wang Sappharot	วังสรรพรส	Khlung	ขลุง	Chanthaburi	จันทบุรี	East
Wang Si Rat	วังศรีราช	Doem Bang Nang Buat	เดิมบางนางบวช	Suphan Buri	สุพรรณบุรี	Central
Wang Sombun	วังสมบูรณ์	Wang Sombun	วังสมบูรณ์	Sa Kaeo	สระแก้ว	East
Wang Suap	วังสวาบ	Phu Pha Man	ภูผาม่าน	Khon Kaen	ขอนแก่น	North-East
Wang Ta Mua	วังตามัว	Mueang Nakhon Phanom	เมืองนครพนม	Nakhon Phanom	นครพนม	North-East
Wang Tabaek	วังตะแบก	Phran Kratai	พรานกระต่าย	Kamphaeng Phet	กำแพงเพชร	Central
Wang Tai	วังใต้	Wang Nuea	วังเหนือ	Lampang	ลำปาง	North
Wang Takhe	วังตะเฆ่	Nong Bua Rawe	หนองบัวระเหว	Chaiyaphum	ชัยภูมิ	North-East
Wang Takhian	วังตะเคียน	Mueang Chachoengsao	เมืองฉะเชิงเทรา	Chachoengsao	ฉะเชิงเทรา	East
Wang Takhian	วังตะเคียน	Nong Mamong	หนองมะโมง	Chai Nat	ชัยนาท	Central
Wang Takhian	วังตะเคียน	Khao Saming	เขาสมิง	Trat	ตราด	East
Wang Takhian	วังตะเคียน	Kabin Buri	กบินทร์บุรี	Prachin Buri	ปราจีนบุรี	East
Wang Takhro	วังตะคร้อ	Ban Dan Lan Hoi	บ้านด่านลานหอย	Sukhothai	สุโขทัย	Central
Wang Tako	วังตะกอ	Lang Suan	หลังสวน	Chumphon	ชุมพร	South
Wang Tako	วังตะโก	Mueang Phetchaburi	เมืองเพชรบุรี	Phetchaburi	เพชรบุรี	West
Wang Taku	วังตะกู	Mueang Nakhon Pathom	เมืองนครปฐม	Nakhon Phanom	นครพนม	North-East
Wang Taku	วังตะกู	Bang Mun Nak	บางมูลนาก	Phichit	พิจิตร	Central
Wang Tanot	วังโตนด	Na Yai Am	นายายอาม	Chanthaburi	จันทบุรี	East
Wang Tha Chang	วังท่าช้าง	Kabin Buri	กบินทร์บุรี	Prachin Buri	ปราจีนบุรี	East
Wang Tha Di	วังท่าดี	Nong Phai	หนองไผ่	Phetchabun	เพชรบูรณ์	Central
Wang Thap Sai	วังทับไทร	Sak Lek	สากเหล็ก	Phichit	พิจิตร	Central
Wang Thong	เมืองอ่างทองวังทอง	Mueang Kamphaeng Phet	เมืองกำแพงเพชร	Kamphaeng Phet	กำแพงเพชร	Central
Wang Thong	วังทอง	Wang Thong	วังทอง	Phitsanulok	พิษณุโลก	Central
Wang Thong	วังทอง	Ban Dung	บ้านดุง	Udon Thani	อุดรธานี	North-East
Wang Thong	วังทอง	Phakdi Chumphon	ภักดีชุมพล	Chaiyaphum	ชัยภูมิ	North-East
Wang Thong	วังทอง	Wang Sombun	วังสมบูรณ์	Sa Kaeo	สระแก้ว	East
Wang Thong	วังทอง	Na Wang	นาวัง	Nong Bua Lamphu	หนองบัวลำภู	North-East
Wang Thong	วังทอง	Khok Charoen	โคกเจริญ	Lopburi	ลพบุรี	Central
Wang Thong	วังทอง	Si Samrong	ศรีสำโรง	Sukhothai	สุโขทัย	Central
Wang Thong	วังทอง	Wang Nuea	วังเหนือ	Lampang	ลำปาง	North
Wang Thong	วังธง	Mueang Phrae	เมืองแพร่	Phrae	แพร่	North
Wang Thong Daeng	วังทองแดง	Mueang Sukhothai	เมืองสุโขทัย	Sukhothai	สุโขทัย	Central
Wang Thonglang	วังทองหลาง	Khet Wang Thonglang	วังทองหลาง	Bangkok	กรุงเทพมหานคร	Central
Wang Wa	วังหว้า	Taphan Hin	ตะพานหิน	Phichit	พิจิตร	Central
Wang Wa	วังหว้า	Klaeng	แกลง	Rayong	ระยอง	East
Wang Wa	วังหว้า	Si Prachan	ศรีประจันต์	Suphan Buri	สุพรรณบุรี	Central
Wang Won	วังวน	Kantang	กันตัง	Trang	ตรัง	South
Wang Won	วังวน	Phrom Phiram	พรหมพิราม	Phitsanulok	พิษณุโลก	Central
Wang Yai	วังใหญ่	Si Samrong	ศรีสำโรง	Sukhothai	สุโขทัย	Central
Wang Yai	วังใหญ่	Wichian Buri	วิเชียรบุรี	Phetchabun	เพชรบูรณ์	Central
Wang Yai	วังใหญ่	Thepha (Malay: Tiba)	เทพา	Songkhla	สงขลา	South
Wang Yai	วังใหญ่	Tha Tako	ท่าตะโก	Nakhon Sawan	นครสวรรค์	Central
Wang Yai Thong	วังยายทอง	Thepharak	เทพารักษ์	Nakhon Ratchasima	นครราชสีมา	North-East
Wang Yang	วังยาง	Si Prachan	ศรีประจันต์	Suphan Buri	สุพรรณบุรี	Central
Wang Yang	วังยาง	Wang Yang	วังยาง	Nakhon Phanom	นครพนม	North-East
Wang Yang	วังยาง	Phanna Nikhom	พรรณนานิคม	Sakon Nakhon	สกลนคร	North-East
Wang Yang	วังยาง	Khlong Khlung	ขลุง คลองขลุง	Kamphaeng Phet	กำแพงเพชร	Central
Wang Yang	วังยาง	Noen Maprang	เนินมะปราง	Phitsanulok	พิษณุโลก	Central
Wang Yao	วังยาว	Kosum Phisai	โกสุมพิสัย	Maha Sarakham	มหาสารคาม	North-East
Wang Yao	วังยาว	Dan Chang	ด่านช้าง	Suphan Buri	สุพรรณบุรี	Central
Wang Yao	วังยาว	Dan Sai	ด่านซ้าย	Loei	เลย	North-East
Wang Yen	วังเย็น	Mueang Kanchanaburi	เมืองกาญจนบุรี	Kanchanaburi	กาญจนบุรี	West
Wang Yen	วังเย็น	Mueang Nakhon Pathom	เมืองนครปฐม	Nakhon Phanom	นครพนม	North-East
Wang Yen	วังเย็น	Bang Phae	บางแพ	Ratchaburi	ราชบุรี	West
Wang Yen	วังเย็น	Plaeng Yao	แปลงยาว	Chachoengsao	ฉะเชิงเทรา	East
Wanon Niwat	วานรนิวาส	Wanon Niwat	วานรนิวาส	Sakon Nakhon	สกลนคร	North-East
Wari Sawat	วารีสวัสดิ์	Phanom Phrai	พนมไพร	Roi Et	ร้อยเอ็ด	North-East
Warin	วาริน	Si Mueang Mai	ศรีเมืองใหม่	Ubon Ratchathani	อุบลราชธานี	North-East
Warin Chamrap	วารินชำราบ	Warin Chamrap	วารินชำราบ	Ubon Ratchathani	อุบลราชธานี	North-East
Waritchaphum	วาริชภูมิ	Waritchaphum	วาริชภูมิ	Sakon Nakhon	สกลนคร	North-East
Wat	วัด	Yarang	ยะรัง	Pattani	ปัตตานี	South
Wat Arun	วัดอรุณ	Khet Bangkok Yai	บางกอกใหญ่	Bangkok	กรุงเทพมหานคร	Central
Wat Bot	วัดโบสถ์	Wat Bot	วัดโบสถ์	Phitsanulok	พิษณุโลก	Central
Wat Bot	วัดโบสถ์	Bang Pla Ma	บางปลาม้า	Suphan Buri	สุพรรณบุรี	Central
Wat Bot	วัดโบสถ์	Mueang Prachinburi	เมืองปราจีนบุรี	Prachin Buri	ปราจีนบุรี	East
Wat Bot	วัดโบสถ์	Phanat Nikhom	พนัสนิคม	Chonburi	ชลบุรี	East
Wat Chalo	วัดชลอ	Bang Kruai	บางกรวย	Nonthaburi	นนทบุรี	Central
Wat Chan	วัดจันทร์	Sathing Phra	สทิงพระ	Songkhla	สงขลา	South
Wat Chan	วัดจันทร์	Mueang Phitsanulok	เมืองพิษณุโลก	Phitsanulok	พิษณุโลก	Central
Wat Dao	วัดดาว	Bang Pla Ma	บางปลาม้า	Suphan Buri	สุพรรณบุรี	Central
Wat Kaeo	วัดแก้ว	Bang Phae	บางแพ	Ratchaburi	ราชบุรี	West
Wat Kanlaya	วัดกัลยาณ์	Khet Thon Buri	ธนบุรี	Bangkok	กรุงเทพมหานคร	Central
Wat Ket	วัดเกต	Mueang Chiang Mai	เมืองเชียงใหม่	Chiang Mai	เชียงใหม่	North
Wat Khae	วัดแค	Nakhon Chai Si	นครชัยศรี	Nakhon Pathom	นครปฐม	Central
Wat Khanun	วัดขนุน	Singhanakhon	สิงหนคร	Songkhla	สงขลา	South
Wat Khok	วัดโคก	Manorom	มโนรมย์	Chai Nat	ชัยนาท	Central
Wat Khwang	วัดขวาง	Pho Thale	โพทะเล	Phichit	พิจิตร	Central
Wat Ko	วัดเกาะ	Si Samrong	ศรีสำโรง	Sukhothai	สุโขทัย	Central
Wat Lamut	วัดละมุด	Nakhon Chai Si	นครชัยศรี	Nakhon Pathom	นครปฐม	Central
Wat Luang	วัดหลวง	Phon Phisai	โพนพิสัย	Nong Khai	หนองคาย	North-East
Wat Luang	วัดหลวง	Phanat Nikhom	พนัสนิคม	Chonburi	ชลบุรี	East
Wat Mai	วัดใหม่-	Mueang Chanthaburi	เมืองจันทบุรี	Chanthaburi	จันทบุรี	East
Wat Pa	วัดป่า	Lom Sak	หล่มสัก	Phetchabun	เพชรบูรณ์	Central
Wat Phleng	วัดเพลง	Wat Phleng	วัดเพลง	Ratchaburi	ราชบุรี	West
Wat Phraya Krai	วัดพระยาไกร	Khet Bang Kho Laem	บางคอแหลม	Bangkok	กรุงเทพมหานคร	Central
Wat Phrik	วัดพริก	Mueang Phitsanulok	เมืองพิษณุโลก	Phitsanulok	พิษณุโลก	Central
Wat Pradu	วัดประดู่	Mueang Surat Thani	เมืองสุราษฎร์ธานี	Surat Thani	สุราษฎร์ธานี	South
Wat Pradu	วัดประดู่	Amphawa	อัมพวา	Samut Songkhram	สมุทรสงคราม	Central
Wat Ratchabophit	วัดราชบพิธ	Khet Phra Nakhon	พระนคร	Bangkok	กรุงเทพมหานคร	Central
Wat Sai	วัดไทร	Mueang Nakhon Sawan	เมืองนครสวรรค์	Nakhon Sawan	นครสวรรค์	Central
Wat Sam Phraya	วัดสามพระยา	Khet Phra Nakhon	พระนคร	Bangkok	กรุงเทพมหานคร	Central
Wat Samrong	วัดสำโรง	Nakhon Chai Si	นครชัยศรี	Nakhon Pathom	นครปฐม	Central
Wat Sing	วัดสิงห์วัดสิงห์	Wat Sing	วัดสิงห์	Chai Nat	ชัยนาท	Central
Wat Sommanat	วัดโสมนัส	Khet Pom Prap Sattru Phai	ป้อมปราบศัตรูพ่าย	Bangkok	กรุงเทพมหานคร	Central
Wat Son	วัดสน	Ranot (Malay: Renut)	ระโนด	Songkhla	สงขลา	South
Wat Suwan	วัดสุวรรณ	Bo Thong	บ่อทอง	Chonburi	ชลบุรี	East
Wat Ta Yom	วัดตายม	Bang Krathum	บางกระทุ่ม	Phitsanulok	พิษณุโลก	Central
Wat Taku	วัดตะกู	Bang Ban	บางบาล	Phra Nakhon Si Ayutthaya	พระนครศรีอยุธยา	Central
Wat Tha Phra	วัดท่าพระ	Khet Bangkok Yai	บางกอกใหญ่	Bangkok	กรุงเทพมหานคร	Central
Wat That	วัดธาตุ	Mueang Nong Khai	เมืองหนองคาย	Nong Khai	หนองคาย	North-East
Wat Thepsirin	วัดเทพศิรินทร์	Khet Pom Prap Sattru Phai	ป้อมปราบศัตรูพ่าย	Bangkok	กรุงเทพมหานคร	Central
Wat Tum	วัดตูม	Phra Nakhon Si Ayutthaya	พระนครศรีอยุธยา	Phra Nakhon Si Ayutthaya	พระนครศรีอยุธยา	Central
Wat Yang Ngam	วัดยางงาม	Pak Tho	ปากท่อ	Ratchaburi	ราชบุรี	West
Wat Yom	วัดยม	Bang Pa-in	บางปะอิน	Phra Nakhon Si Ayutthaya	พระนครศรีอยุธยา	Central
Wat Yom	วัดยม	Bang Ban	บางบาล	Phra Nakhon Si Ayutthaya	พระนครศรีอยุธยา	Central
Watthana	วัฒนา	Song Dao	ส่องดาว	Sakon Nakhon	สกลนคร	North-East
Watthana Nakhon	วัฒนานคร	Watthana Nakhon	วัฒนานคร	Sa Kaeo	สระแก้ว	East
Wawi	วาวี	Mae Suai	แม่สรวย	Chiang Rai	เชียงราย	North
Wiang	เวียง	Chiang Khong	เชียงของ	Chiang Rai	เชียงราย	North
Wiang	เวียง	Mueang Phayao	เมืองพะเยา	Phayao	พะเยา	North
Wiang	เวียง	Chiang Saen	เชียงแสน	Chiang Rai	เชียงราย	North
Wiang	เวียง	Fang	ฝาง	Chiang Mai	เชียงใหม่	North
Wiang	เวียง	Thoeng	เทิง	Chiang Rai	เชียงราย	North
Wiang	เวียง	Mueang Chiang Rai	เมืองเชียงราย	Chiang Rai	เชียงราย	North
Wiang	เวียง	Phrao	พร้าว	Chiang Mai	เชียงใหม่	North
Wiang	เวียง	Wiang Pa Pao	เวียงป่าเป้า	Chiang Rai	เชียงราย	North
Wiang	เวียง	Chaiya	ไชยา	Surat Thani	สุราษฎร์ธานี	South
Wiang	เวียง	Chiang Kham	เชียงคำ	Phayao	พะเยา	North
Wiang Chai	เวียงชัย	Phayakkhaphum Phisai	พยัคฆภูมิพิสัย	Maha Sarakham	มหาสารคาม	North-East
Wiang Chai	เวียงชัย	Wiang Chai	เวียงชัย	Chiang Rai	เชียงราย	North
Wiang Hao	เวียงห้าว	Phan	พาน	Chiang Rai	เชียงราย	North
Wiang Kalong	เวียงกาหลง	Wiang Pa Pao	เวียงป่าเป้า	Chiang Rai	เชียงราย	North
Wiang Kham	เวียงคำ	Kumphawapi	กุมภวาปี	Udon Thani	อุดรธานี	North-East
Wiang Khoi	เวียงคอย	Mueang Phetchaburi	เมืองเพชรบุรี	Phetchaburi	เพชรบุรี	West
Wiang Khuk	เวียงคุก	Mueang Nong Khai	เมืองหนองคาย	Nong Khai	หนองคาย	North-East
Wiang Nuea	เวียงเหนือ	Mueang Lampang	เมืองลำปาง	Lampang	ลำปาง	North
Wiang Nuea	เวียงเหนือ	Pai	ปาย	Mae Hong Son	แม่ฮ่องสอน	North
Wiang Nuea	เวียงเหนือ	Kantharalak	กันทรลักษ์	Sisaket	ศรีสะเกษ	North-East
Wiang Nuea	เวียงเหนือ	Wiang Chai	เวียงชัย	Chiang Rai	เชียงราย	North
Wiang Phang Kham	เวียงพางคำ	Mae Sai	แม่สาย	Chiang Rai	เชียงราย	North
Wiang Sa	เวียงสระ	Wiang Sa	เวียงสระ	Surat Thani	สุราษฎร์ธานี	South
Wiang Sa-at	เวียงสะอาด	Phayakkhaphum Phisai	พยัคฆภูมิพิสัย	Maha Sarakham	มหาสารคาม	North-East
Wiang Ta	เวียงต้า	Long	ลอง	Phrae	แพร่	North
Wiang Tai	เวียงใต้	Pai	ปาย	Mae Hong Son	แม่ฮ่องสอน	North
Wiang Tan	เวียงตาล	Hang Chat	ห้างฉัตร	Lampang	ลำปาง	North
Wiang Thong	เวียงทอง	Sung Men	สูงเม่น	Phrae	แพร่	North
Wiang Yong	เวียงยอง	Mueang Lamphun	เมืองลำพูน	Lamphun	ลำพูน	North
Wichet Nakhon	วิเชตนคร	Chae Hom	แจ้ห่ม	Lampang	ลำปาง	North
Wichit	วิชิต	Mueang Phuket	เมืองภูเก็ต	Phuket	ภูเก็ต	South
Wihan Daeng	วิหารแดง	Wihan Daeng	วิหารแดง	Saraburi	สระบุรี	Central
Wihan Khao	วิหารขาว	Tha Chang	ท่าช้าง	Sing Buri	สิงห์บุรี	Central
Wisai Nuea	วิสัยเหนือ	Mueang Chumphon	เมืองชุมพร	Chumphon	ชุมพร	South
Wisai Tai	วิสัยใต้	Sawi	สวี	Chumphon	ชุมพร	South
Wisit	วิศิษฐ์	Mueang Bueng Kan	เมืองบึงกาฬ	Bueng Kan	บึงกาฬ	North-East
Wisit	วิศิษฐ์	Bueng Kan	บึงกาฬ	Nong Khai	หนองคาย	North-East
Wo Kaeo	วอแก้ว	Hang Chat	ห้างฉัตร	Lampang	ลำปาง	North
Woe	เว่อ	Yang Talat	ยางตลาด	Kalasin	กาฬสินธุ์	North-East
Woen Phra Bat	เวินพระบาท	Tha Uthen	ท่าอุเทน	Nakhon Phanom	นครพนม	North-East
Wong Khong	วงฆ้อง	Phrom Phiram	พรหมพิราม	Phitsanulok	พิษณุโลก	Central
Wong Sawang	วงศ์สว่าง	Khet Bang Sue	บางซื่อ	Bangkok	กรุงเทพมหานคร	Central
Wora Nakhon	วรนคร	Pua	ปัว	Nan	น่าน	North

== See also ==
- Organization of the government of Thailand
- List of districts of Thailand
- List of districts of Bangkok
- List of tambon in Thailand
- Provinces of Thailand
- List of municipalities in Thailand
