= Ko Kha =

Ko Kha may refer to the following places in Lampang Province, Thailand:

- Ko Kha district
- Ko Kha subdistrict, a tambon and village within Ko Kha district
