= Mae Tha district =

There are two amphoe (districts) named Mae Tha in Thailand, which, however, have two different Thai spellings

- Amphoe Mae Tha, Lampang province (แม่ทะ)
- Amphoe Mae Tha, Lamphun province (แม่ทา)
