= Makok =

Makok may refer to:

- Makok, the Thai common name for the plant species Spondias pinnata
- Makok nam, the Thai common name for the plant species Elaeocarpus hygrophilus
- Makok Subdistrict, a tambon in Lamphun Province, Thailand
