= Pa Sang district =

Pa Sang ป่าซาง
- District
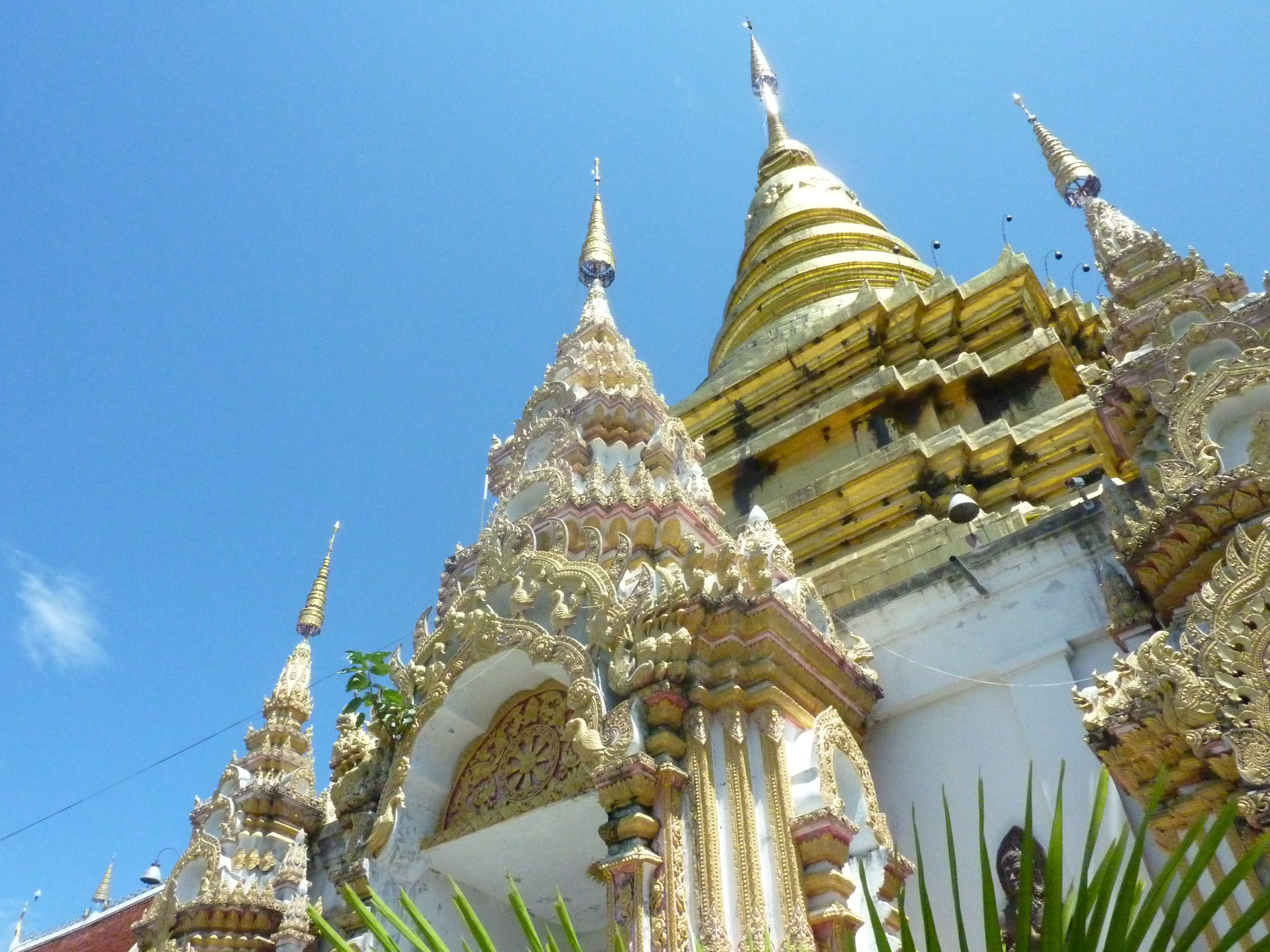
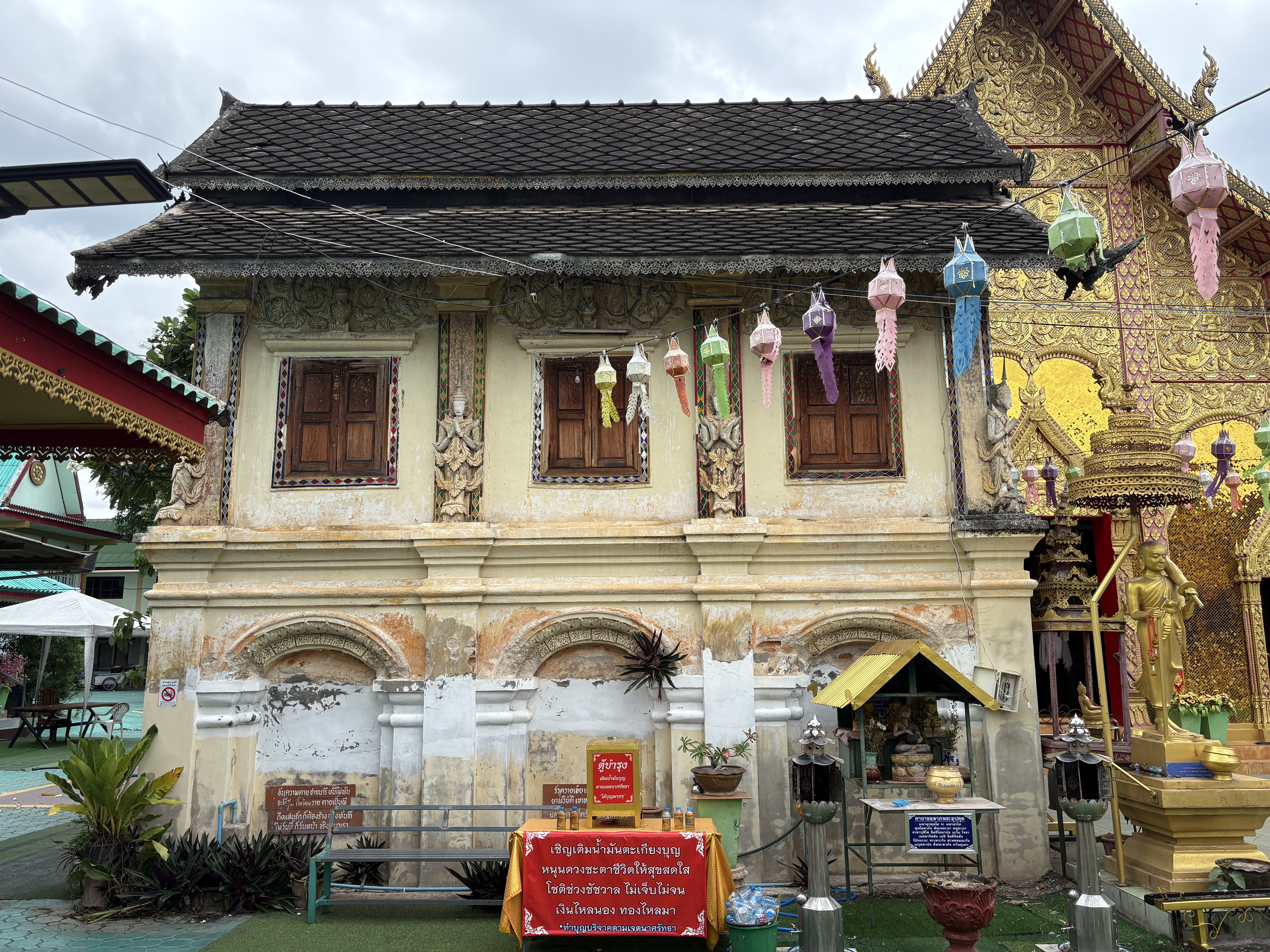
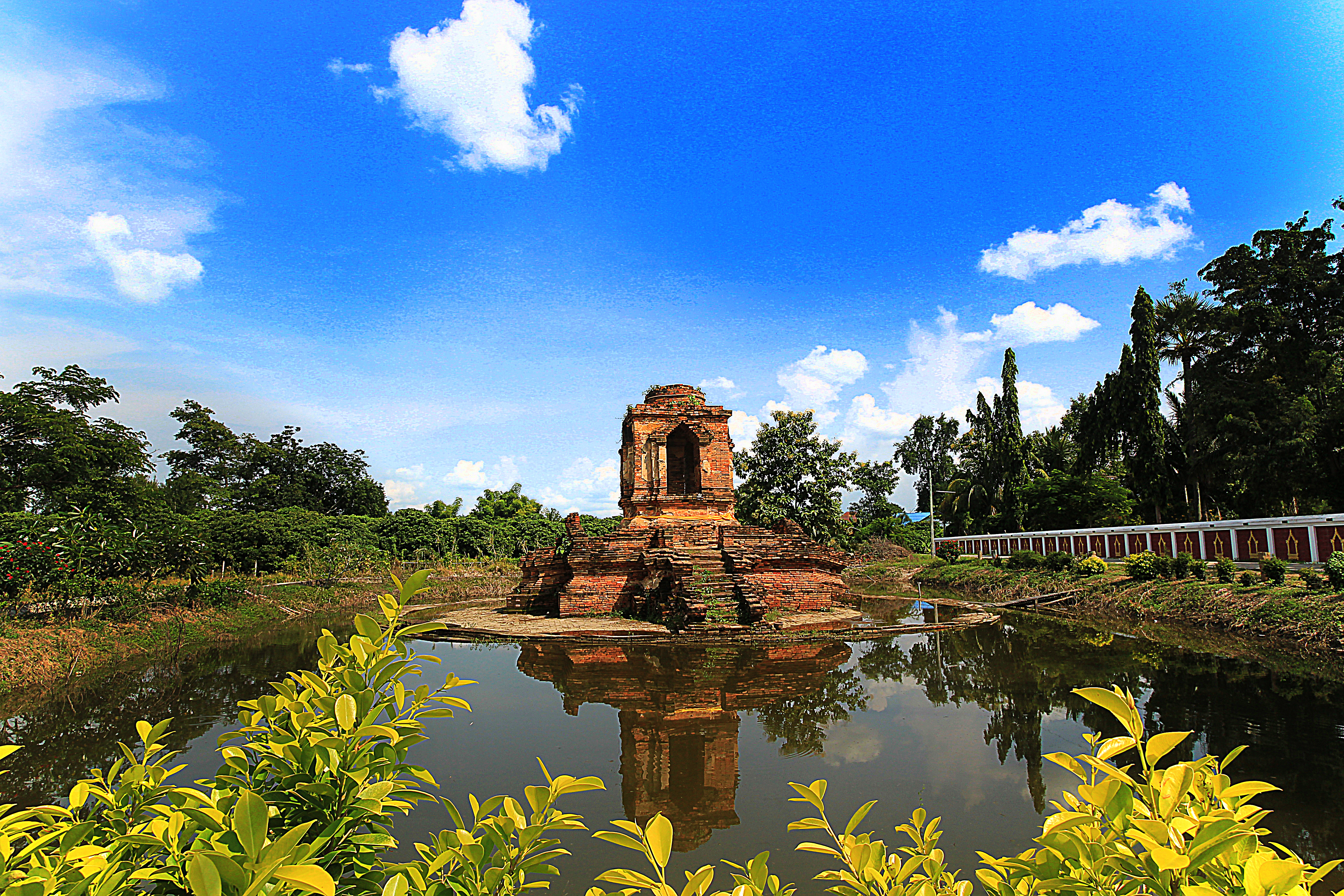
- Wat Phra Phutthabat Tak Pha Wat Pa Sang Ngam Wat Ko Klang

- District location in Lamphun province
- Coordinates: 18°31′33″N 98°56′21″E
- Country: Thailand
- Province: Lamphun
- Seat: Pa Sang

Area
  - Total: 299.9 km^{2} (115.8 sq mi)

Population (2015)
  - Total: 55,824
  - Density: 195.5/km^{2} (506/sq mi)
- Time zone: UTC+7 (ICT)
- Postal code: 51120
- Geocode: 5106

Pa Sang (Thai: ป่าซาง, pronounced [pàː sāːŋ]) is a district (amphoe) of Lamphun province, northern Thailand.

== Geography ==
Neighboring districts are (from the east clockwise) Mueang Lamphun, Mae Tha, Ban Hong and Wiang Nong Long of Lamphun Province, Doi Lo and San Pa Tong of Chiang Mai province.

== History ==
Originally named Pak Bong after its central sub-district, the district was renamed Pa Sang in 1953.

== Ethnic groups ==
The district is home to a population of Yong people. They migrated from Muang Yong of Shan State of today's Myanmar to the northern part of Thailand in 1805 or in the early-Rattanakosin period. Yong women are known as skillful cloth weavers.

== Administration ==
=== Central administration ===
Pa Sang district is divided into nine sub-districts (tambons), which are further subdivided into 90 administrative villages (mubans).

No.	Name	Thai	Villages	Pop.
1.	Pak Bong	ปากบ่อง	5	3,415
2.	Pa Sang	ป่าซาง	5	5,450
3.	Mae Raeng	แม่แรง	11	7,368
4.	Muang Noi	ม่วงน้อย	8	4,466
5.	Ban Ruean	บ้านเรือน	8	4,059
6.	Makok	มะกอก	9	5,361
7.	Tha Tum	ท่าตุ้ม	14	7,345
8.	Nam Dip	น้ำดิบ	17	9,592
11.	Nakhon Chedi	นครเจดีย์	13	8,768

Note: Missing numbers are tambons which now form Wiang Nong Long District.

=== Local administration ===
There are four sub-district municipalities (thesaban tambons) in the district:

- Pa Sang (Thai: เทศบาลตำบลป่าซาง) consisting of sub-districts Pak Bong, Pa Sang.
- Muang Noi (Thai: เทศบาลตำบลม่วงน้อย) consisting of sub-district Muang Noi.
- Mae Raeng (Thai: เทศบาลตำบลแม่แรง) consisting of sub-district Mae Raeng.
- Makok (Thai: เทศบาลตำบลมะกอก) consisting of sub-district Makok.

There are four sub-district administrative organizations (SAO) in the district:

- Ban Ruean (Thai: องค์การบริหารส่วนตำบลบ้านเรือน) consisting of sub-district Ban Ruean.
- Tha Tum (Thai: องค์การบริหารส่วนตำบลท่าตุ้ม) consisting of sub-district Tha Tum.
- Nam Dip (Thai: องค์การบริหารส่วนตำบลน้ำดิบ) consisting of sub-district Nam Dip.
- Nakhon Chedi (Thai: องค์การบริหารส่วนตำบลนครเจดีย์) consisting of sub-district Nakhon Chedi.
