= Mueang Phan =

Coordinates: 19.5497°N 99.7566°E

Mueang Phan เมืองพาน
- Tambon
- Interactive map of Mueang Phan
- Country: Thailand
- Province: Chiang Rai
- Amphoe: Phan

Population (2005)
  - Total: 19,326
- Time zone: UTC+7 (Thailand)

Mueang Phan (Thai: เมืองพาน) is a village and tambon (subdistrict) of Phan District, in Chiang Rai Province, Thailand. In 2005 it had a total population of 19,326 people. The tambon contains 25 villages.
