= Tha Pha =

Tha Pha can refer to:

- Tha Pha, a tambon of Ko Kha District, Lampang Province, Thailand
- Tha Pha, a tambon of Ban Pong District, Ratchaburi Province, Thailand
- Tha Pha, a tambon of Mae Chaem District, Chiang Mai Province, Thailand
