= Lai Hin =

Lai Hin ไหล่หิน
- Tambon
- Country: Thailand
- Province: Lampang
- Amphoe: Ko Kha District

Population (2005)
  - Total: 5,657
- Time zone: UTC+7 (Thailand)

Lai Hin (Thai: ไหล่หิน) is a village and tambon (subdistrict) of Ko Kha District, in Lampang Province, Thailand. In 2005 it had a total population of 5657 people. The tambon contains 6 villages.
