= Lampang Luang =

Lampang Luang ลำปางหลวง
- Subdistrict
- Interactive map of Lampang Luang
- Coordinates: 18°13′04″N 99°23′17″E
- Country: Thailand
- Province: Lampang
- District: Ko Kha District

Population (2005)
  - Total: 9,965
- Time zone: UTC+7 (ICT)

Lampang Luang (Thai: ลำปางหลวง) is a village and tambon (subdistrict) of Ko Kha District, in Lampang Province, Thailand. In 2005 it had a population of 9965 people. The tambon contains 12 villages.
