= Tha Tum =

Tha Tum ท่าตุ้ม
- Subdistrict
- Country: Thailand
- Province: Lamphun
- District: Pa Sang District

Population (2005)
  - Total: 7,750
- Time zone: UTC+7 (ICT)

Tha Tum (Thai: ท่าตุ้ม, pronounced [tʰâː tûm]) is a village and tambon (subdistrict) of Pa Sang District, in Lamphun Province, Thailand. In 2005 it had a population of 7750 people. The tambon contains 14 villages.

== Climate ==
Climate data for Tha Tum (1981–2010)
Month	Jan	Feb	Mar	Apr	May	Jun	Jul	Aug	Sep	Oct	Nov	Dec	Year
Record high °C (°F)	37.4 (99.3)	39.4 (102.9)	41.1 (106.0)	42.3 (108.1)	41.3 (106.3)	38.4 (101.1)	37.8 (100.0)	37.2 (99.0)	36.5 (97.7)	34.7 (94.5)	36.6 (97.9)	35.9 (96.6)	42.3 (108.1)
Mean daily maximum °C (°F)	31.1 (88.0)	33.6 (92.5)	35.6 (96.1)	36.6 (97.9)	34.9 (94.8)	33.7 (92.7)	33.0 (91.4)	32.3 (90.1)	31.8 (89.2)	31.2 (88.2)	30.7 (87.3)	29.9 (85.8)	32.9 (91.2)
Daily mean °C (°F)	24.0 (75.2)	26.2 (79.2)	28.7 (83.7)	30.4 (86.7)	29.5 (85.1)	29.1 (84.4)	28.6 (83.5)	28.2 (82.8)	27.7 (81.9)	27.0 (80.6)	25.4 (77.7)	23.7 (74.7)	27.4 (81.3)
Mean daily minimum °C (°F)	17.6 (63.7)	20.3 (68.5)	23.0 (73.4)	25.1 (77.2)	25.1 (77.2)	25.1 (77.2)	24.8 (76.6)	24.6 (76.3)	24.2 (75.6)	23.2 (73.8)	20.7 (69.3)	17.8 (64.0)	22.6 (72.7)
Record low °C (°F)	9.6 (49.3)	11.3 (52.3)	11.4 (52.5)	17.9 (64.2)	20.3 (68.5)	20.3 (68.5)	21.6 (70.9)	20.4 (68.7)	20.3 (68.5)	16.7 (62.1)	13.2 (55.8)	8.1 (46.6)	8.1 (46.6)
Average rainfall mm (inches)	5.1 (0.20)	16.1 (0.63)	44.2 (1.74)	86.7 (3.41)	172.3 (6.78)	206.1 (8.11)	218.2 (8.59)	227.9 (8.97)	263.0 (10.35)	126.3 (4.97)	21.0 (0.83)	1.0 (0.04)	1,387.9 (54.64)
Average rainy days	0.7	2.3	4.4	6.9	14.2	16.4	17.4	17.5	17.8	10.6	2.8	0.4	111.4
Average relative humidity (%)	68	65	63	66	75	77	79	81	84	80	73	70	73
Mean monthly sunshine hours	279.0	259.9	275.9	240.0	195.3	153.0	158.1	117.8	144.0	198.4	252.0	275.9	2,549.3
Mean daily sunshine hours	9.0	9.2	8.9	8.0	6.3	5.1	5.1	3.8	4.8	6.4	8.4	8.9	7.0
Source 1: Thai Meteorological Department
Source 2: Office of Water Management and Hydrology, Royal Irrigation Department (sun and humidity)
