= Mai Phatthana =

Mai Phatthana ใหม่พัฒนา
- Tambon
- Country: Thailand
- Province: Lampang
- Amphoe: Ko Kha District

Population (2005)
  - Total: 5,408
- Time zone: UTC+7 (Thailand)

Mai Phatthana (Thai: ใหม่พัฒนา) is a tambon (subdistrict) of Ko Kha District, in Lampang Province, Thailand. In 2005 it had a total population of 5408 people. The tambon contains 9 villages.
