= Pak Bong =

Coordinates: 18°42′N 98°55′E

Pak Bong ปากบ่อง
- Subdistrict
- Interactive map of Pak Bong
- Country: Thailand
- Province: Lamphun
- District: Pa Sang District

Population (2005)
  - Total: 3,777
- Time zone: UTC+7 (ICT)

Pak Bong (Thai: ปากบ่อง, pronounced [pàːk bɔ̀ŋ]) is a village and tambon (subdistrict) of Pa Sang District, in Lamphun Province, Thailand. In 2005, it had a population of 3777 people. The tambon contains five villages.
