= Nong Yuang =

Nong Yuang หนองยวง
- Subdistrict
- Country: Thailand
- Province: Lamphun
- District: Wiang Nong Long District

Population (2005)
  - Total: 4,078
- Time zone: UTC+7 (ICT)

Nong Yuang (Thai: หนองยวง, pronounced [nɔ̌ːŋ jūa̯ŋ]) is a village and tambon (subdistrict) of Wiang Nong Long District, in Lamphun Province, Thailand. In 2005 it had a population of 4078 people. The tambon contains five villages.
