= Sala, Lampang =

Village in Thailand

Sala, Lampang ศาลา
- Tambon
- Interactive map of Sala, Lampang
- Coordinates: 18.192854°N 99.400087°E
- Country: Thailand
- Province: Lampang
- Amphoe: Ko Kha District

Population (2005)
  - Total: 8,732
- Time zone: UTC+7 (Thailand)

Sala, Lampang (Thai: ศาลา) is a village and tambon (subdistrict) of Ko Kha District, in Lampang Province, Thailand. In 2005, it had a total population of 8732 people. The tambon contains 7 villages.

== Gallery ==
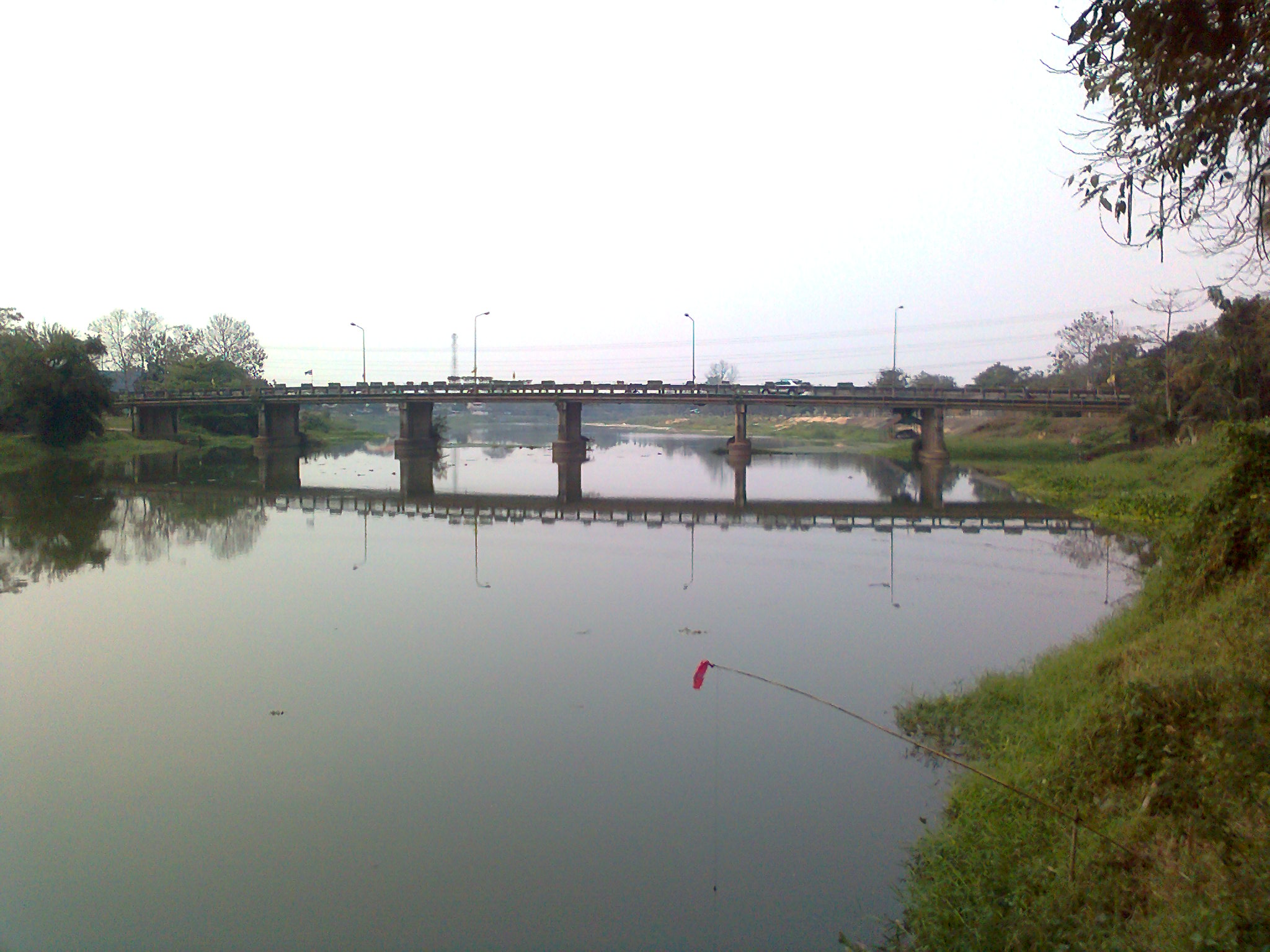
Wang River in Sala

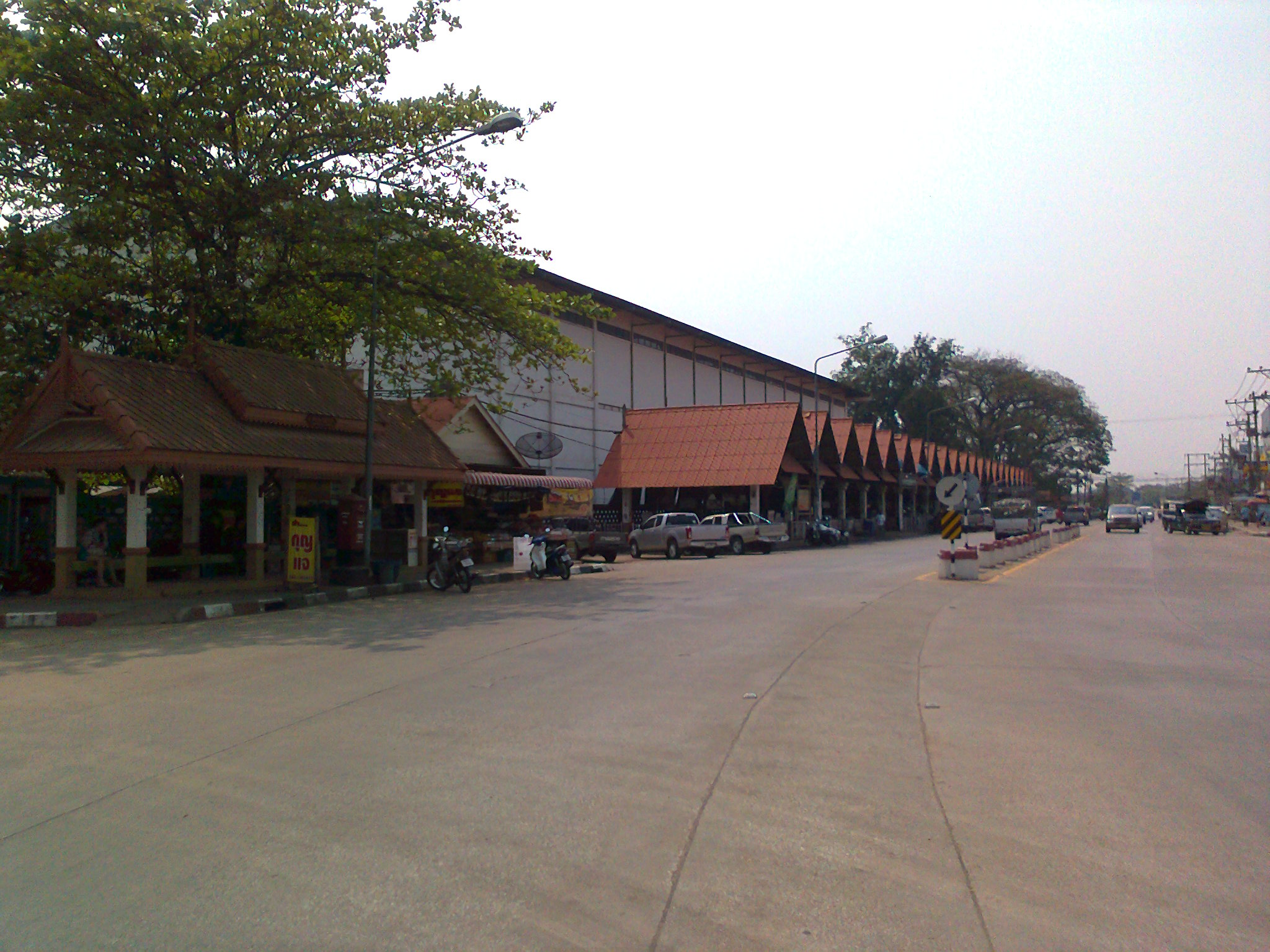

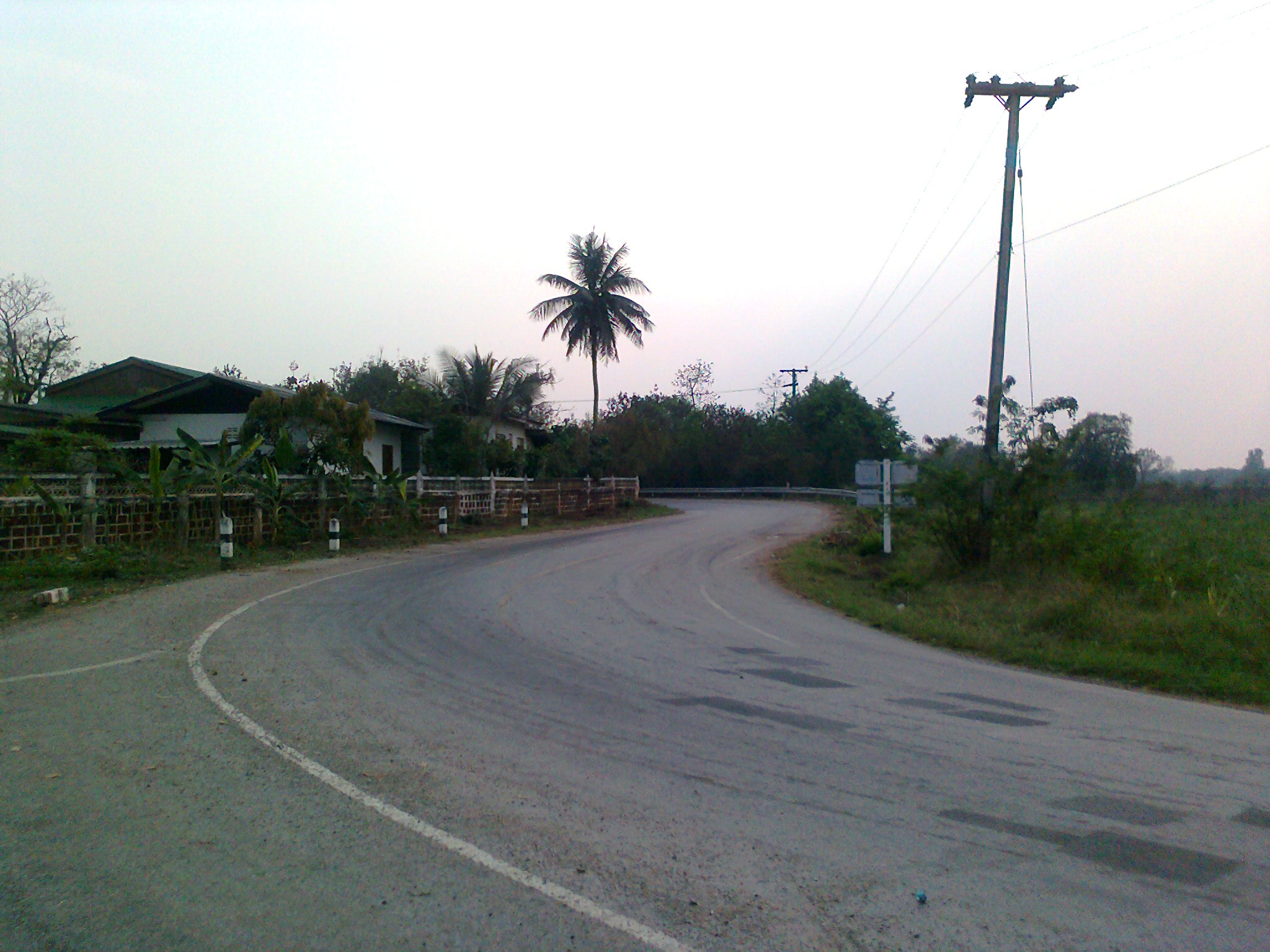

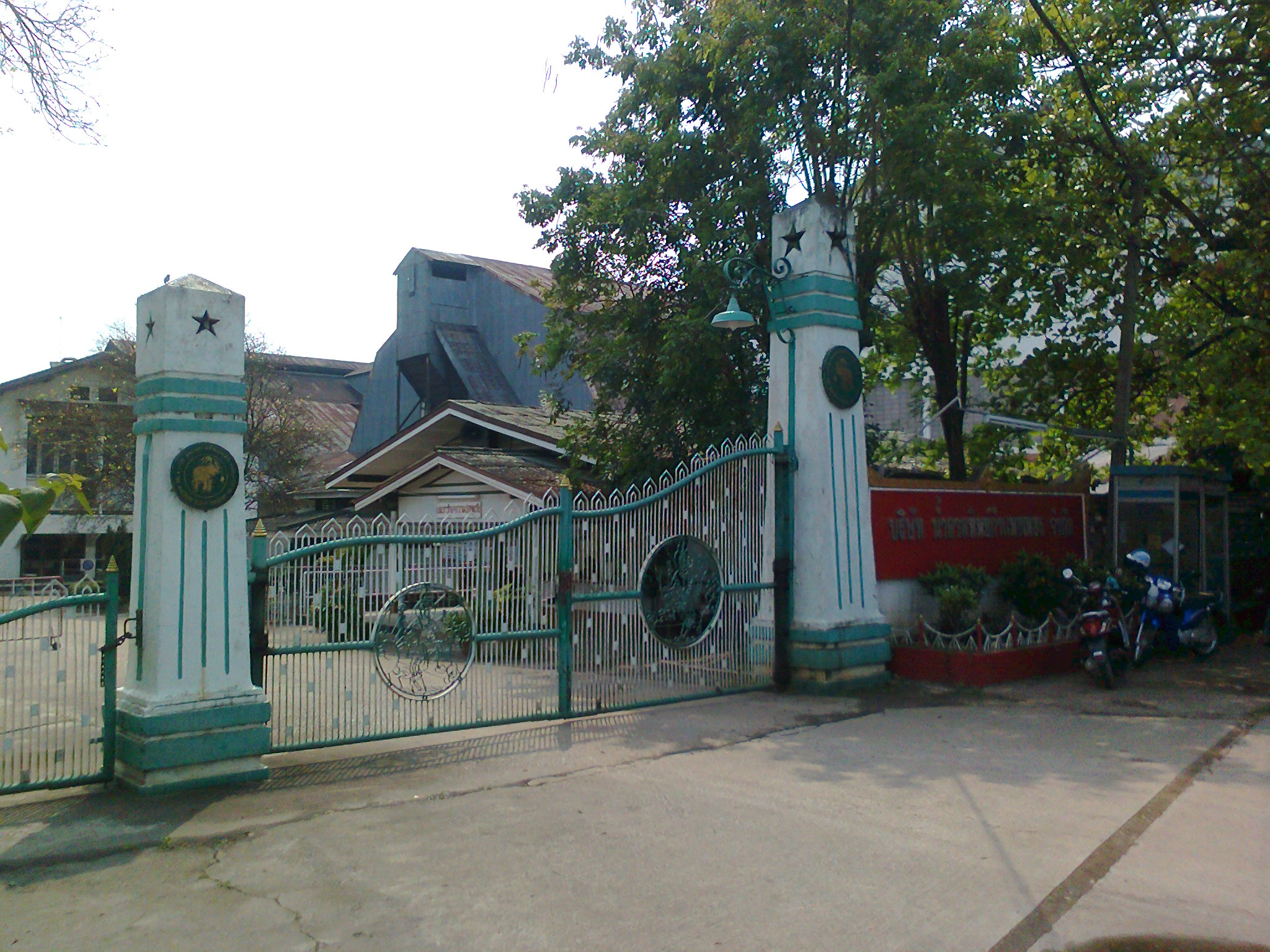

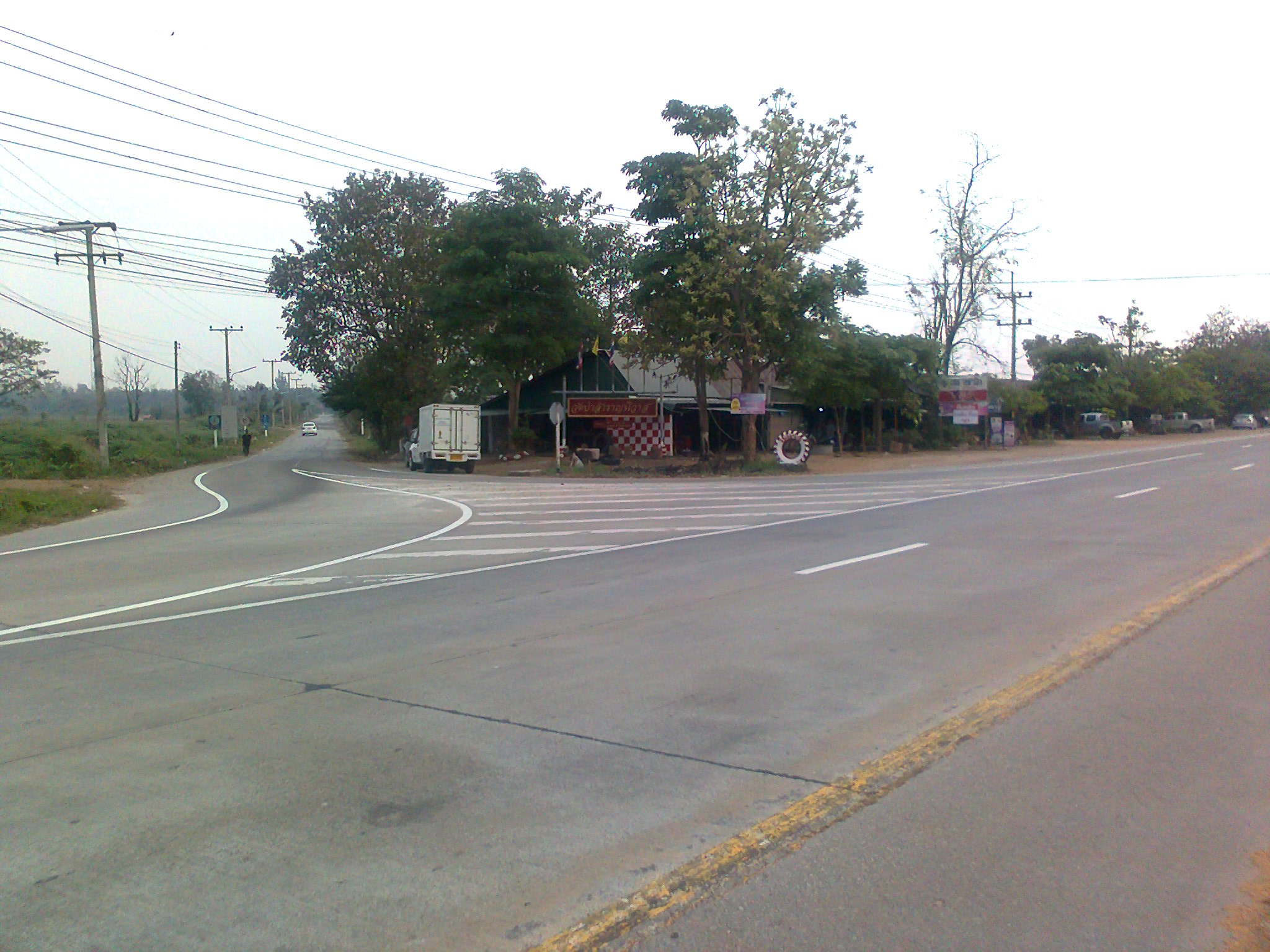
