= Muang Noi =

Muang Noi ม่วงน้อย
- Subdistrict
- Country: Thailand
- Province: Lamphun
- District: Pa Sang District

Population (2005)
  - Total: 4,649
- Time zone: UTC+7 (Thailand)

Muang Noi (Thai: ม่วงน้อย, pronounced [mûa̯ŋ nɔ́ːj]) is a village and tambon (subdistrict) of Pa Sang District, in Lamphun Province, Thailand. In 2005 it had a population of 4649 people. The tambon contains eight villages.
