= Nakhon Chedi =

Nakhon Chedi นครเจดีย์
- Subdistrict
- Country: Thailand
- Province: Lamphun
- District: Pa Sang District

Population (2005)
  - Total: 8,596
- Time zone: UTC+7 (ICT)

Nakhon Chedi (Thai: นครเจดีย์, pronounced [ná(ʔ).kʰɔ̄ːn t͡ɕēː.dīː]) is a village and tambon (subdistrict) of Pa Sang District, in Lamphun Province, Thailand. In 2005 it had a population of 8596 people. The tambon contains 12 villages.
