= Mae Raeng =

Mae Raeng แม่แรง
- Subdistrict
- Country: Thailand
- Province: Lamphun
- District: Pa Sang District

Population (2005)
  - Total: 7,627
- Time zone: UTC+7 (ICT)

Mae Raeng (Thai: แม่แรง, pronounced [mɛ̂ː rɛ̄ːŋ]) is a village and tambon (subdistrict) of Pa Sang District, in Lamphun Province, Thailand. In 2005 it had a population of 7627 people. The tambon contains 11 villages.
