= Wang Nuea subdistrict =

Coordinates: 19°09′N 99°37′E

Wang Nuea วังเหนือ
- Subdistrict
- Interactive map of Wang Nuea
- Country: Thailand
- Province: Lampang
- District: Wang Nuea

Population (2016)
  - Total: 6,963
- Time zone: UTC+7 (ICT)
- Postal code: 52140
- TIS 1099: 520702

Wang Nuea (Thai: วังเหนือ) is a tambon (subdistrict) of Wang Nuea District, in Lampang Province, Thailand. In 2016 it had a population of 6,963 people.

== Administration ==
=== Central administration ===
The tambon is subdivided into nine administrative villages (mubans).

No.	Name	Thai
1.	Ban Huai Kiang	บ้านห้วยเกี๋ยง
2.	Ban Mai Phatthana	บ้านใหม่พัฒนา
3.	Ban Huai Khoi	บ้านห้วยข่อย
4.	Ban Thung Pao	บ้านทุ่งเป้า
5.	Ban Phae Tai	บ้านแพะใต้
6.	Ban Mai	บ้านใหม่
7.	Ban Mae Hiao	บ้านแม่เฮียว
8.	Ban Pa Hiang	บ้านป่าเหียง
9.	Ban Khan Hom	บ้านขันหอม

=== Local administration ===
The area of the subdistrict is shared by three local governments.

- the subdistrict municipality (Thesaban Tambon) Ban Mai (เทศบาลตำบลบ้านใหม่)
- the subdistrict municipality (Thesaban Tambon) Wang Nuea (เทศบาลตำบลวังเหนือ)
- the subdistrict administrative organization (SAO) Wang Nuea (องค์การบริหารส่วนตำบลวังเหนือ)
