= Pa Sak, Phrae =

Pa Sak ป่าสัก
- Tambon
- Location within Thailand
- Country: Thailand
- Province: Phrae
- Amphoe: Wang Chin

Population (2019)
  - Total: 5,362
- Time zone: UTC+7 (TST)
- Postal code: 54160
- TIS 1099: 540706

Pa Sak (Thai: ป่าสัก) is a tambon (subdistrict) of Wang Chin District, in Phrae Province, Thailand. In 2019 it had a total population of 5,362 people.

== History ==
The subdistrict was created effective November 5, 1990 by splitting off 5 administrative villages from Soi.

== Administration ==
=== Central administration ===
The tambon is subdivided into 10 administrative villages (muban).

No.	Name	Thai
1.	Ban Mae Kratom	บ้านแม่กระต๋อม
2.	Ban Pang Mai	บ้านปางไม้
3.	Ban Pa Sak	บ้านป่าสัก
4.	Ban Song Khwae	บ้านสองแคว
5.	Ban Pong Tuet	บ้านโป่งตื้ด
6.	Ban Mae Kratom Lang	บ้านแม่กระต๋อมล่าง
7.	Ban Song Khwae	บ้านสองแคว
8.	Ban Pa Sak Bon	บ้านป่าสักบน
9.	Ban Pang Mai Phatthana	บ้านปางไม้พัฒนา
10.	Ban Mae Kratom Bon	บ้านแม่กระต๋อมบน

=== Local administration ===
The whole area of the subdistrict is covered by the subdistrict administrative organization (SAO) Pa Sak (องค์การบริหารส่วนตำบลป่าสัก).
