= Sai Khao =

Sai Khao ทรายขาว
- Tambon
- Country: Thailand
- Province: Chiang Rai
- Amphoe: Phan

Population (2005)
  - Total: 10,077
- Time zone: UTC+7 (Thailand)

Sai Khao (Thai: ทรายขาว) is a village and tambon (subdistrict) of Phan District, in Chiang Rai Province, Thailand. In 2005 it had a total population of 10,077 people. The tambon contains 17 villages.
