= Wiang Hao =

Wiang Hao เวียงห้าว
- Tambon
- Interactive map of Wiang Hao
- Coordinates: 19°34′41″N 99°52′59″E
- Country: Thailand
- Province: Chiang Rai
- Amphoe: Phan

Population (2005)
  - Total: 3,501
- Time zone: UTC+7 (Thailand)

Wiang Hao (Thai: เวียงห้าว) is a village and tambon (subdistrict) of Phan District, in Chiang Rai Province, Thailand. In 2005 it had a total population of 3,501 people. The tambon contains 8 villages.
