= Sop Prap district =

Sop Prap สบปราบ
- District
- District location in Lampang province
- Coordinates: 17°52′51″N 99°20′14″E
- Country: Thailand
- Province: Lampang
- Seat: Sop Prap

Area
  - Total: 502.46 km^{2} (194.00 sq mi)

Population (2005)
  - Total: 28,515
  - Density: 56.8/km^{2} (147/sq mi)
- Time zone: UTC+7 (ICT)
- Postal code: 52170
- Geocode: 5211

Sop Prap (Thai: สบปราบ, pronounced [sòp pràːp]; Northern Thai: ᨽᩫ᩠ᨷᨸᩕᩣ᩠ᨷ, pronounced [sǒp pʰàːp]) is a district (amphoe) in the southern part of Lampang province, northern Thailand.

== History ==
The district was downgraded to a minor district (king amphoe) on 28 December 1917 and made a subordinate of Ko Kha district. It then consisted of the three tambons: Sop Prap, Samai, and Mae Kua. It was upgraded to a full district on 1 January 1953. Mr. Phayon Chanthanakhom was the first head officer of the district.

== Etymology ==
The name Sop Prap comes from the Prap River, which joins the Wang River in the district. It is also a name to commemorate the courage of the people in the area, who defeated Burmese invaders.

== Geography ==
Neighboring districts are (from the south clockwise): Thoen, Soem Ngam, Ko Kha, Mae Tha of Lampang Province and Wang Chin of Phrae province.

The important water resources are the Wang and Prap Rivers.

== Administration ==
The district is divided into four subdistricts (tambons), which are further subdivided into 35 villages (mubans). Sop Prap is a township (thesaban tambon) which covers parts of tambon Sop Prap. There are a further four tambon administrative organizations (TAO).

No.	Name	Thai name	Villages	Pop.
1.	Sop Prap	สบปราบ	12	10,949
2.	Samai	สมัย	8	7,584
3.	Mae Kua	แม่กัวะ	6	5,096
4.	Na Yang	นายาง	9	4,886
