= Wat Phra Phutthabat Tak Pha =

Buddhist temple in Thailand

- วัดพระพุทธบาทตากผ้า
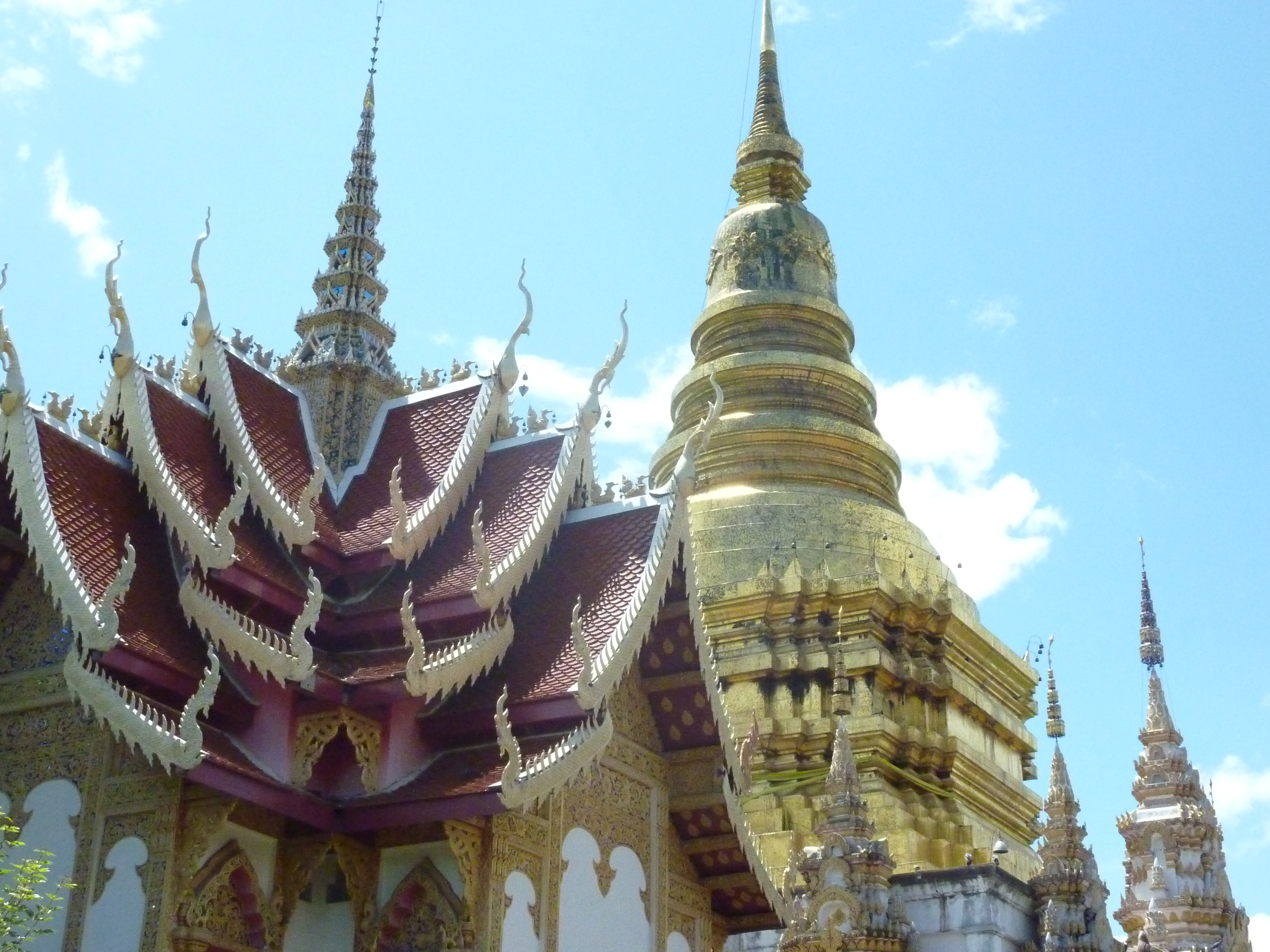

Religion
- Affiliation: Buddhist
- Sect: Theravāda
- Status: Third-class royal temple

Location
- Location: Makok, Pa Sang, Lamphun
- Country: Thailand
- Interactive map of Wat Phra Phutthabat Tak Pha
- Coordinates: 18°27′17″N 98°55′17″E

Wat Phra Phutthabat Tak Pha (Thai: วัดพระพุทธบาทตากผ้า) is a Buddhist temple in Makok in Lamphun province, Thailand. It received official recognition (Note: Thai: วิสุงคามสีมา, RTGS: wisungkhamasima; Pali: visuṃgāmasīmā.) on 25 October 1973 and became a third-class royal temple of the common type (Note: Thai: พระอารามหลวงชั้นตรี ชนิดสามัญ, RTGS: phra aram luang chan tri chanit saman.) on 31 May 1978.

The name of the temple refers to a footprint of the Buddha (Phutthabat) within the temple grounds and to the belief that the Buddha once dried his robes (tak pha) nearby.

The temple's chedi sits at the top of a steep hill. It can be reached by climbing a Nāga staircase of 469 steps or by taking the road on the other side.

Somes scenes in the 1988 film Rambo III were filmed at the temple.
