= Pa Sang subdistrict, Lamphun =

Pa Sang, Lamphun ป่าซาง
- Subdistrict
- Country: Thailand
- Province: Lamphun
- District: Pa Sang District

Population (2005)
  - Total: 6,013
- Time zone: UTC+7 (ICT)

Pa Sang (Thai: ป่าซาง, pronounced [pàː sāːŋ]) is a village and tambon (subdistrict) of Pa Sang District, in Lamphun Province, Thailand. In 2005 it had a population of 6013 people. The tambon contains five villages.
