= Ban Ruean =

Coordinates: 18°31′N 98°53′E

Ban Ruean บ้านเรือน
- Subdistrict
- Interactive map of Ban Ruean
- Country: Thailand
- Province: Lamphun
- District: Pa Sang District

Population (2005)
  - Total: 4,388
- Time zone: UTC+7 (ICT)

Ban Ruean (Thai: บ้านเรือน, pronounced [bâːn rɯ̄a̯n]) is a village and tambon (subdistrict) of Pa Sang District, in Lamphun Province, Thailand. In 2005, it had a population of 4,388 people. The tambon contains eight villages.
