= Nong Long =

Coordinates: 18.405837°N 98.725097°E

Nong Long หนองล่อง
- Subdistrict
- Interactive map of Nong Long
- Country: Thailand
- Province: Lamphun
- District: Wiang Nong Long District

Population (2005)
  - Total: 6,064
- Time zone: UTC+7 (ICT)

Nong Long (Thai: หนองล่อง, pronounced [nɔ̌ːŋ lɔ̂ŋ]) is a village and tambon (subdistrict) of Wiang Nong Long District, in Lamphun Province, Thailand. In 2005 it had a population of 6064 people. The tambon contains nine villages.
