= Nam Dip =

Coordinates: 18°27′N 98°50′E

Nam Dip น้ำดิบ
- Subdistrict
- Interactive map of Nam Dip
- Country: Thailand
- Province: Lamphun
- District: Pa Sang

Population (2015)
  - Total: 9,592
- Time zone: UTC+7 (ICT)
- Postal code: 51120
- TIS 1099: 510608

Nam Dip (Thai: น้ำดิบ, pronounced [náːm dìp]) is a tambon (subdistrict) of Pa Sang District, in Lamphun Province, Thailand. In 2015 it had a population of 9,592 people.

== Administration ==
=== Central administration ===
The tambon is subdivided into 17 administrative villages (mubans).

No.	Name	Thai
1.	Ban Lao Pa Koi	บ้านเหล่าป่าก๋อย
2.	Ban Huai O	บ้านห้วยอ้อ
3.	Ban Rai Dong	บ้านไร่ดง
4.	Ban Pak Long	บ้านปากล้อง
5.	Ban Nong Pha Khao	บ้านหนองผ้าขาว
6.	Ban Nam Dip Noi	บ้านน้ำดิบน้อย
7.	Ban Nam Dip Luang	บ้านน้ำดิบหลวง
8.	Ban Wang Ku	บ้านวังกู่
9.	Ban Pa Rok Fa	บ้านป่ารกฟ้า
10.	Ban Cham Chomphu	บ้านจำชมภู
11.	Ban San Pa Hak	บ้านสันป่าฮัก
12.	Ban Wang Suan Kluai	บ้านวังสวนกล้วย
13.	Ban Tha Mai	บ้านท่าไม้
14.	Ban San Charoen	บ้านสันเจริญ
15.	Ban Mai Pa Fang	บ้านใหม่ป่าฝาง
16.	Ban Rai Dong Nuea	บ้านไร่ดงเหนือ
17.	Ban Nam Dip Nuea	บ้านน้ำดิบเหนือ

=== Local administration ===
The whole area of the subdistrict is covered by the subdistrict administrative organization (SAO) Nam Dip (องค์การบริหารส่วนตำบลน้ำดิบ).
