= Mueang Pan district =

Mueang Pan เมืองปาน
- District
- District location in Lampang province
- Coordinates: 18°46′14″N 99°29′54″E
- Country: Thailand
- Province: Lampang
- Seat: Mueang Pan

Area
  - Total: 865.103 km^{2} (334.018 sq mi)

Population (2005)
  - Total: 34,494
  - Density: 39.9/km^{2} (103/sq mi)
- Time zone: UTC+7 (ICT)
- Postal code: 52240
- Geocode: 5213

Mueang Pan (Thai: เมืองปาน, pronounced [mɯ̄a̯ŋ pāːn]) is a district (amphoe) in the northern part of Lampang province, northern Thailand.

== Geography ==
Neighboring districts are (from the north clockwise) Wiang Pa Pao of Chiang Rai province, Wang Nuea, Chae Hom, and Mueang Lampang of Lampang Province, and Mae On and Doi Saket of Chiang Mai province.

The Phi Pan Nam Mountains dominate the landscape of the district.

== History ==
The minor district (king amphoe) Mueang Pan was established on 15 July 1981, when the four tambons Mueang Pan, Chae Son, Ban Kho, and Thung Kwao were split off from Chae Hom district. On 9 May 1992 it was upgraded to a full district.

== Administration ==
The district is divided into five subdistricts (tambons), which are further subdivided into 53 villages (mubans). There are no municipal (thesaban) areas. There are five tambon administrative organizations (TAO).

No.	Name	Thai name	Villages	Pop.
1.	Mueang Pan	เมืองปาน	8	5,646
2.	Ban Kho	บ้านขอ	13	8,160
3.	Thung Kwao	ทุ่งกว๋าว	13	9,394
4.	Chae Son	แจ้ซ้อน	12	7,201
5.	Hua Mueang	หัวเมือง	7	4,093
