= Na Saeng, Lampang =

Na Saeng
- Tambon
- Country: Thailand
- Province: Lampang
- Amphoe: Ko Kha District

Population (2005)
  - Total: 4,999
- Time zone: UTC+7 (Thailand)

Na Saeng (Thai: ?) is a village and tambon (subdistrict) of Ko Kha District, in Lampang Province, Thailand. In 2005 it had a total population of 4999 people. The tambon contains 7 villages.
