= Na Kaeo =

Na Kaeo นาแก้ว
- Tambon
- Country: Thailand
- Province: Lampang
- Amphoe: Ko Kha

Population (2010)
  - Total: 9,690
- Time zone: UTC+7 (Thailand)
- Postal code: 52130
- Geocode: 520302
- Website: http://www.nakaew.go.th/

Na Kaeo (Thai: นาแก้ว) is a tambon (subdistrict) of Ko Kha District, in Lampang Province, Thailand. As of 2010, it has a total population of 9,690 people.

== Administration ==
The tambon contains 9 administrative villages (Muban), the latest created in 2004.

No.	Name	Thai
1.	Ban Song Khwae Nuea	บ้านสองแควเหนือ
2.	Ban Song Khwae Tai	บ้านสองแควใต้
3.	Ban Sop Tam	บ้านสบต่ำ
4.	Ban Na Kaeo Tawan Tok	บ้านนาแก้วตะวันตก
5.	Ban Chom Ping	บ้านจอมปิง
6.	Ban Si Don Mun	บ้านศรีดอนมูล
7.	Ban Pa Khae	บ้านป่าแข
8.	Ban Phra That Chom Ping	บ้านพระธาตุจอมปิง
9.	Ban Song Khwae Santi Suk	บ้านสองแควสันติสุข

In 1996, the Tambon administrative organization (TAO) Na Kaeo was established as the local administration for the subdistrict. In 2008, this was upgraded to a subdistrict municipality (thesaban tambon).
