= Tha Pha, Lampang =

Tha Pha, Koh Kha, Lampang
- Tambon
- Country: Thailand
- Province: Lampang
- Amphoe: Ko Kha District

Population (2005)
  - Total: 7,423
- Time zone: UTC+7 (Thailand)

Tha Pha, Lampang (Thai: ท่าผา) is a village and tambon (subdistrict) of Ko Kha District, in Lampang Province, Thailand. In 2005 it had a total population of 7423 people. The tambon contains 9 villages.
