= Chae Hom district =

Chae Hom แจ้ห่ม
- District
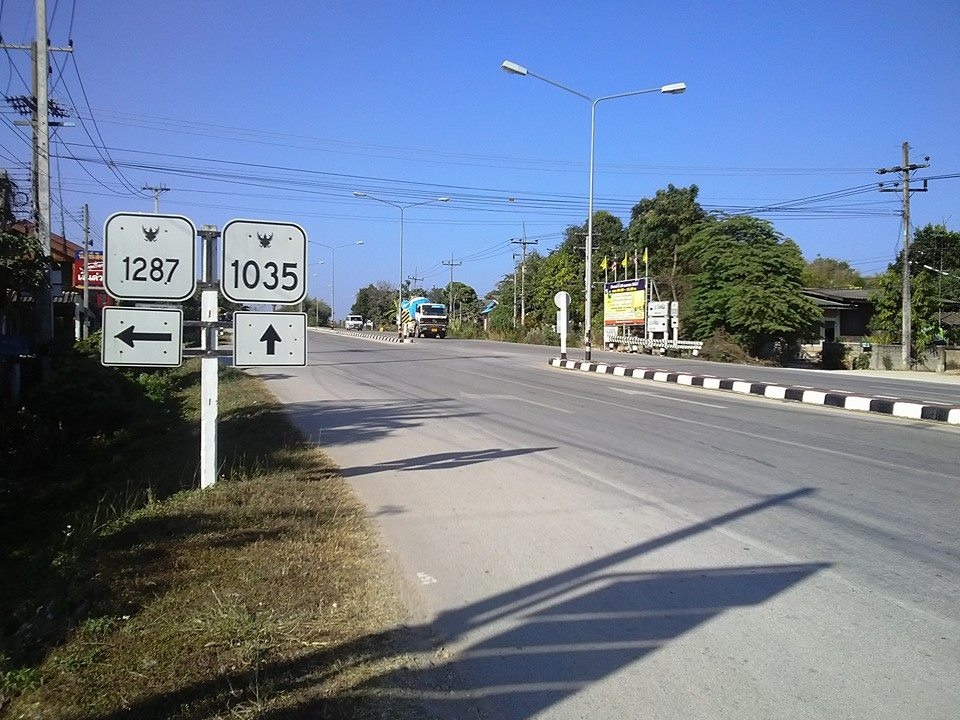
- National Highway No. 1035

- District location in Lampang province
- Coordinates: 18°42′46″N 99°33′27″E
- Country: Thailand
- Province: Lampang
- Seat: Wichet Nakhon

Area
  - Total: 1,349.121 km^{2} (520.899 sq mi)

Population (2005)
  - Total: 42,457
  - Density: 31.2/km^{2} (81/sq mi)
- Time zone: UTC+7 (ICT)
- Postal code: 52120
- Geocode: 5206

Chae Hom (Thai: แจ้ห่ม, pronounced [t͡ɕɛ̂ː hòm]) is a district (amphoe) of Lampang province, northern Thailand.

== Geography ==
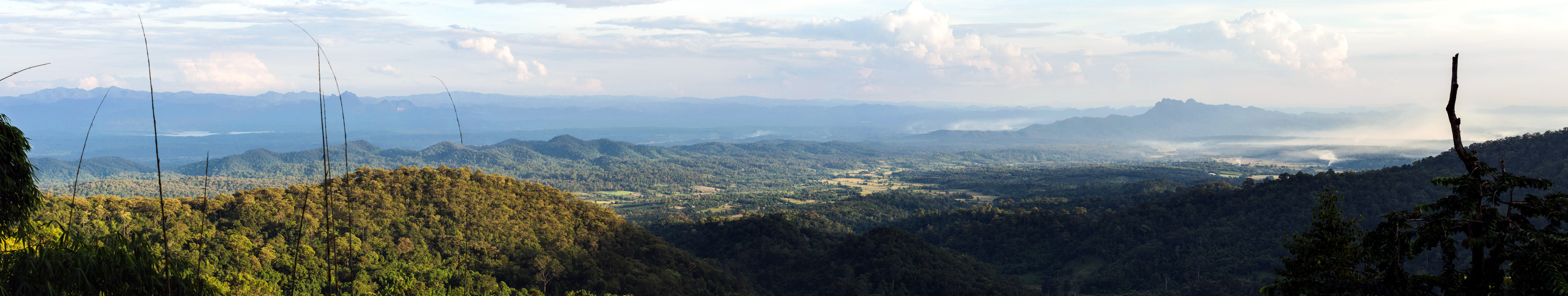
The Wang River valley, Chae Hom District, with the mountains of the Phi Pan Nam Range in the distance, as seen from Rte 1252 in the mountains of the Khun Tan Range

Neighboring districts are (from the north clockwise): Wang Nuea, Ngao, Mae Mo, Mueang Lampang and Mueang Pan of Lampang Province.

== Administration ==
The district is divided into seven subdistricts (tambons), which are further subdivided into 58 villages (mubans). Chae Hom is a township (thesaban tambon) which covers parts of tambon Chae Hom. There are a further seven tambon administrative organizations (TAO).

No.	Name	Thai name	Villages	Pop.
1.	Chae Hom	แจ้ห่ม	10	8,903
2.	Ban Sa	บ้านสา	7	5,299
3.	Pong Don	ปงดอน	8	5,188
4.	Mae Suk	แม่สุก	11	7,400
5.	Mueang Mai	เมืองมาย	5	3,332
6.	Thung Phueng	ทุ่งผึ้ง	6	4,121
7.	Wichet Nakhon	วิเชตนคร	11	8,214
