= Ko Kha subdistrict =

Coordinates: 18°12′N 99°24′E

Ko Kha เกาะคา
- Tambon
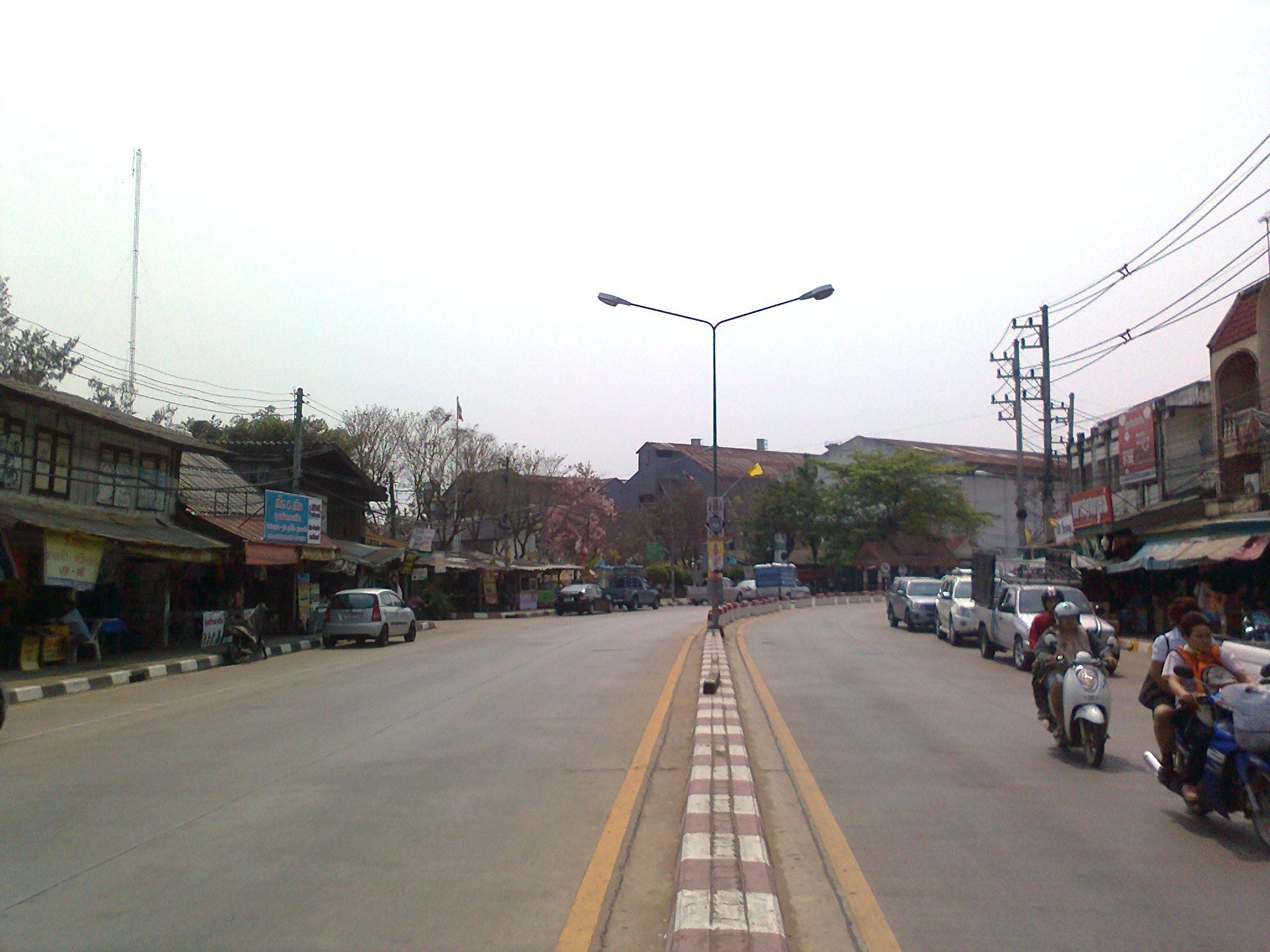
- Interactive map of Ko Kha
- Country: Thailand
- Province: Lampang
- Amphoe: Ko Kha District

Population (2005)
  - Total: 4,352
- Time zone: UTC+7 (Thailand)

Ko Kha (Thai: เกาะคา) is a village and tambon (subdistrict) of Ko Kha District, in Lampang Province, Thailand. In 2005 it had a total population of 4352 people. The tambon contains 8 villages.
