= Wang Pong district =

Wang Pong วังโป่ง
- District
- District location in Phetchabun province
- Coordinates: 16°20′28″N 100°47′36″E
- Country: Thailand
- Province: Phetchabun
- Seat: Wang Pong

Area
  - Total: 543.0 km^{2} (209.7 sq mi)

Population (2005)
  - Total: 38,473
  - Density: 70.8/km^{2} (183/sq mi)
- Time zone: UTC+7 (ICT)
- Postal code: 67240
- Geocode: 6710

Wang Pong (Thai: วังโป่ง, pronounced [wāŋ pòːŋ]) is a district (amphoe) in the western part of Phetchabun province, central Thailand.

== History ==
The three tambons Wang Pong, Thai Dong, and Sap Poep were separated from Chon Daen district and made a minor district (king amphoe) on 1 December 1983. It was upgraded to a full district on 21 May 1990.

The original name of this area was Ban Wang Din Pong.

== Geography ==
Neighboring districts are (from the north clockwise) Mueang Phetchabun and Chon Daen of Phetchabun Province, Tap Khlo of Phichit province, and Noen Maprang of Phitsanulok province.

== Administration ==
The district is divided into five sub-districts (tambons), which are further subdivided into 58 villages (mubans). There are two townships (thesaban tambons) in the district: Wang Pong and Thai Dong, each covering parts of the same-named tambons. There are a further five tambon administrative organizations (TAO).

No.	Name	Thai name	Villages	Pop.
1.	Wang Pong	วังโป่ง	11	10,189
2.	Thai Dong	ท้ายดง	13	8,066
3.	Sap Poep	ซับเปิบ	8	4,924
4.	Wang Hin	วังหิน	14	9,633
5.	Wang San	วังศาล	12	5,661
