= Wang Chin district =

Wang Chin district อำเภอวังชิ้น
- District
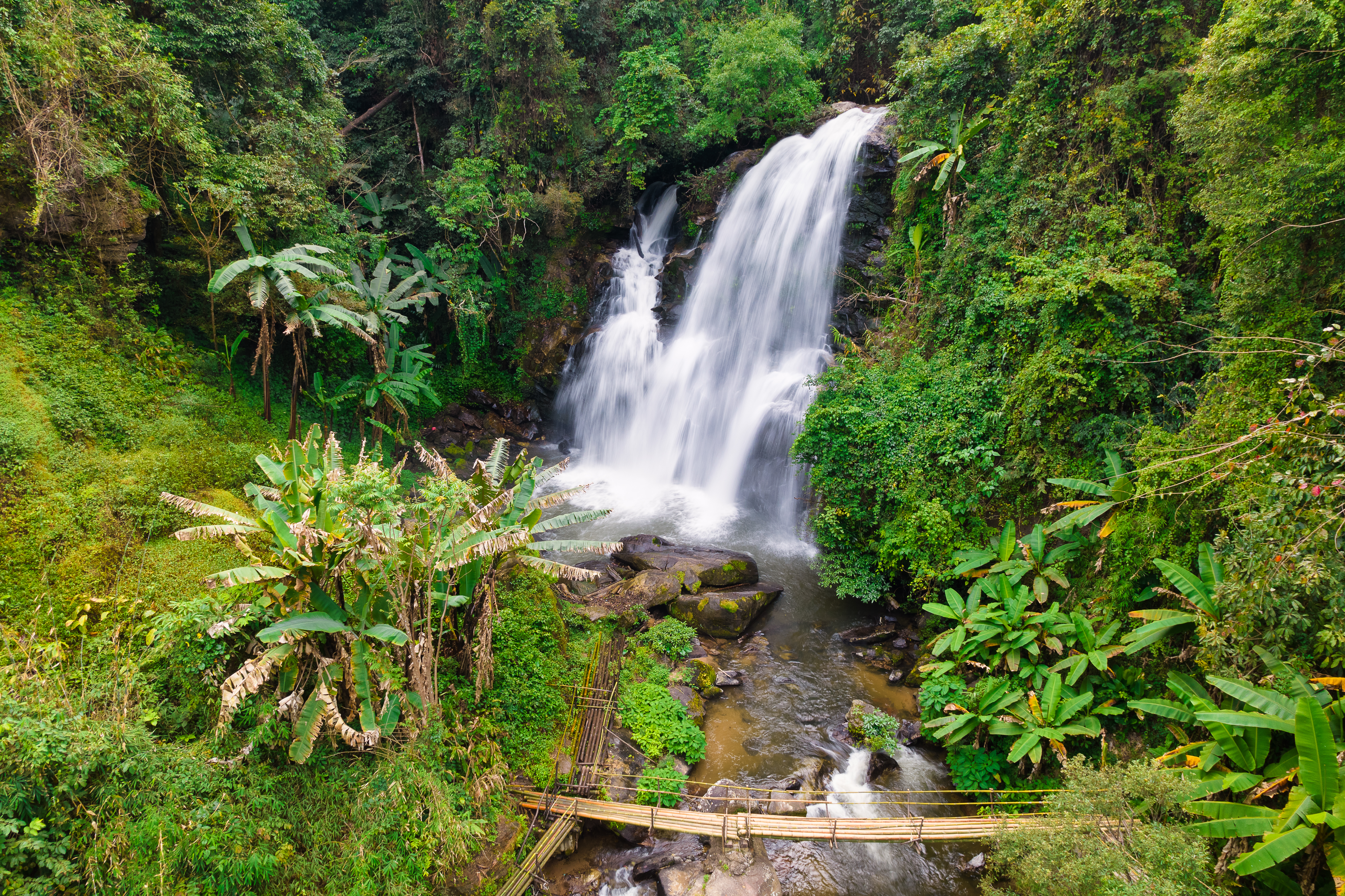
- Mae Koeng Luang Waterfall, Mae Koeng, Wiang Kosai National Park

- District location in Phrae province
- Coordinates: 17°54′0″N 99°36′12″E
- Country: Thailand
- Province: Phrae
- Seat: Wang Chin

Area
  - Total: 1,216.96 km^{2} (469.87 sq mi)

Population (2005)
  - Total: 47,720
  - Density: 39.2/km^{2} (102/sq mi)
- Time zone: UTC+7 (ICT)
- Postal code: 54160
- Geocode: 5407

Wang Chin (Thai: อำเภอวังชิ้น, pronounced [wāŋ tɕʰín]; Northern Thai: ᩅᩢ᩠ᨦᨩᩥ᩠᩶ᨶ, pronounced [wāŋ tɕín]) is a district (amphoe) in the southern part of Phrae province, northern Thailand.

== History ==
An inscribed stone found at Wat Bang Sanuk in the district in the early 1940s carries the earliest dated evidence of settlement in the area. Numbered C.107 and written in Thai after three lines of Pali, it records that a ruler titled khun had 11,108 images of the Buddha stamped in tin and clay, gave a relic, and built a laterite cetiya that took a month from the forming of the blocks to the stucco. Griswold and Prasert na Nagara dated it to 1339 when they published it in 1979; Hans Penth re-dated it in 1996 to Thursday 28 March 1219, a reading David K. Wyatt follows. The inscription's two place names, Müang Trōk Salōp and Chæ Ngun, are not identified with any modern town; Wyatt places them somewhere in the upper Yom valley between Si Satchanalai and Phrae, and reads them as a paired polity on the model of Sukhothai and Si Satchanalai rather than as an old and a new name for one place. Chusak Satienpattanodom places Müeang Trōk Salōp in the modern district, and describes it as a frontier town of Si Satchanalai that stood outside Sukhothai's control at times.

Originally the area of the district was part of Mueang Lampang district. In 1930 it was reassigned to Long district, Phrae Province. On 1 March 1939 the minor district (king amphoe) Wang Chin was established as a subordinate of Long District, which was upgraded to a full district in 1958.

== Geography ==
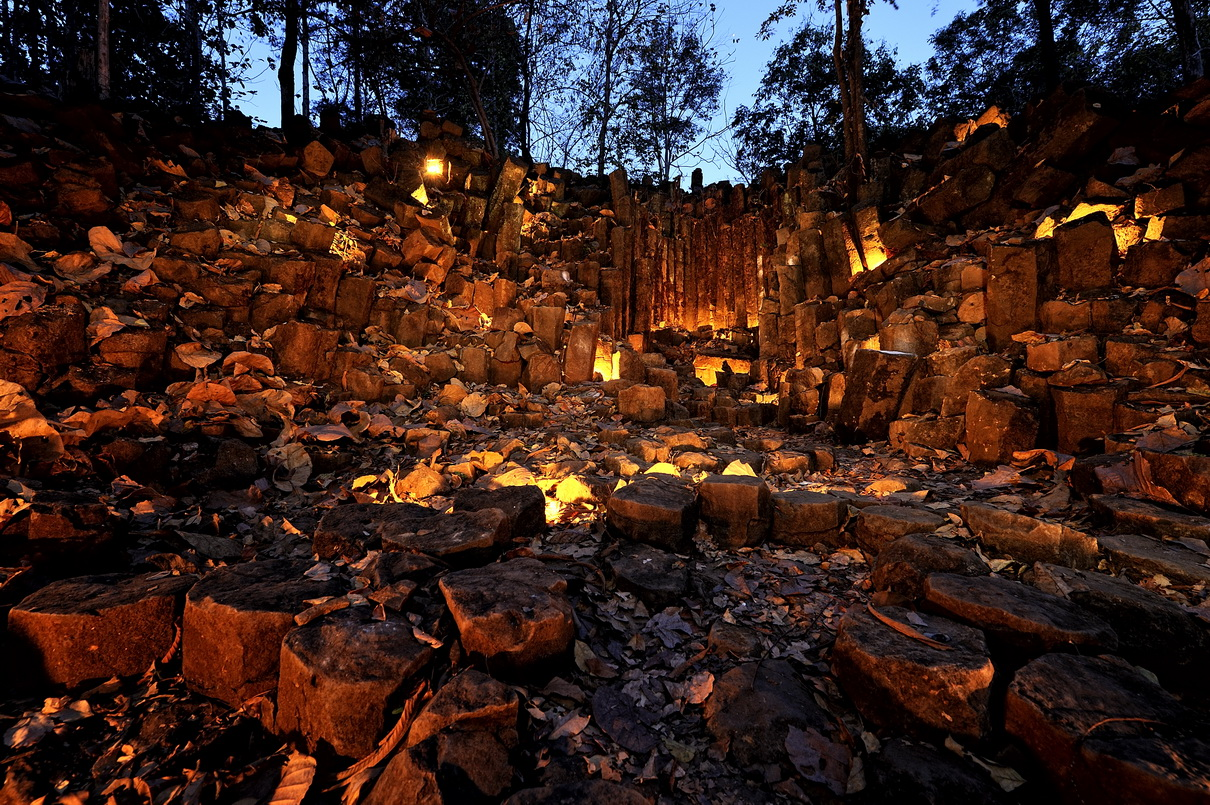
Columnar basalt formations, Wiang Kosai National Park

Neighboring districts are (from the north clockwise): Long and Den Chai of Phrae Province; Si Satchanalai of Sukhothai province; Thoen, Sop Prap, and Mae Tha of Lampang province.

The Phi Pan Nam Mountains dominate the landscape of the district. Wiang Kosai National Park is in it. There are columnar basalt formations in Mon Hin Kong (Thai: ม่อนหินกอง) in an area in the mountains near Na Phun, in this district.

== Administration ==
The district is divided into seven sub-districts (tambons), which are further subdivided into 77 villages (mubans). Wang Chin is a township (thesaban tambon) and covers parts of tambon Wang Chin. There are a further seven tambon administrative organizations (TAO).

No.	Name	Thai name	Villages	Pop.
1.	Wang Chin	วังชิ้น	11	9,166
2.	Saroi	สรอย	11	6,565
3.	Mae Pak	แม่ป้าก	10	5,318
4.	Na Phun	นาพูน	11	7,713
5.	Mae Phung	แม่พุง	16	8,625
6.	Pa Sak	ป่าสัก	10	5,654
7.	Mae Koeng	แม่เกิ๋ง	8	4,679
