= Wang Phrao =

Coordinates: 18.1478°N 99.4004°E

Wang Phrao วังพร้าว
- Tambon
- Interactive map of Wang Phrao
- Country: Thailand
- Province: Lampang
- Amphoe: Ko Kha District

Population (2005)
  - Total: 7,242
- Time zone: UTC+7 (Thailand)

Wang Phrao (Thai: วังพร้าว) is a village and tambon (subdistrict) of Ko Kha District, in Lampang Province, Thailand. In 2005 it had a total population of 7242 people. The tambon contains 7 villages.
