= Wiang Nong Long district =

Wiang Nong Long เวียงหนองล่อง
- Amphoe
- Amphoe location in Lamphun province
- Coordinates: 18°23′36″N 98°43′6″E
- Country: Thailand
- Province: Lamphun

Area
  - Total: 49.4 km^{2} (19.1 sq mi)

Population (2015)
  - Total: 17,739
  - Density: 377.8/km^{2} (978/sq mi)
- Time zone: UTC+7 (ICT)
- Postal code: 51120
- Geocode: 5108

Wiang Nong Long (Thai: เวียงหนองล่อง, pronounced [wīa̯ŋ nɔ̌ːŋ lɔ̂ŋ]) is a district (amphoe) of Lamphun province, northern Thailand.

== History ==
The minor district (king amphoe) was split off from Pa Sang district becoming effective on 1 April 1995.

On 15 May 2007, all 81 minor districts were upgraded to full districts. With publication in the Royal Gazette on 24 August, the upgrade became official.

== Geography ==
Neighboring districts are (from the east clockwise) Pa Sang and Ban Hong of Lamphun Province, Chom Thong and Doi Lo of Chiang Mai province.

== Administration ==
=== Central administration ===
The district Wiang Nong Long is divided into three sub-districts (tambon), which are further subdivided into 25 administrative villages (Muban).

No.	Name	Thai	Villages	Pop.
1.	Nong Long	หนองล่อง	9	5,887
2.	Nong Yuang	หนองยวง	5	3,801
3.	Wang Phang	วังผาง	11	8,051

=== Local administration ===
There are three sub-district municipalities (Thesaban Tambon) in the district:

- Wang Phang (Thai: เทศบาลตำบลวังผาง) consisting of sub-district Wang Phang.
- Nong Yuang (Thai: เทศบาลตำบลหนองยวง) consisting of sub-district Nong Yuang.
- Nong Long (Thai: เทศบาลตำบลหนองล่อง) consisting of sub-district Nong Long.
