= Wang Phang =

Coordinates: 18°26′N 98°46′E

Wang Phang วังผาง
- Subdistrict
- Interactive map of Wang Phang
- Country: Thailand
- Province: Lamphun
- District: Wiang Nong Long

Population (2015)
  - Total: 8,051
- Time zone: UTC+7 (ICT)
- Postal code: 51120
- TIS 1099: 510803

Wang Phang (Thai: วังผาง, pronounced [wāŋ pʰǎːŋ]) is a tambon (subdistrict) of Wiang Nong Long District, in Lamphun Province, Thailand. In 2015 it had a population of 8,051 people.

== Administration ==
=== Central administration ===
The tambon is subdivided into 11 administrative villages (mubans).

No.	Name	Thai
1.	Ban Lao Maeo	บ้านเหล่าแมว
2.	Ban Lao Pong Suea	บ้านเหล่าปงเสือ
3.	Ban Rong Than - Tha Li	บ้านร้องธาร-ท่าลี่
4.	Ban Wang Phang	บ้านวังผาง
5.	Ban Dong Luang	บ้านดงหลวง
6.	Ban Wiang Nong Long	บ้านเวียงหนองล่อง
7.	Ban Wang Mun	บ้านวังหมุ้น
8.	Ban Dong Nuea	บ้านดงเหนือ
9.	Ban Klang Thung	บ้านกลางทุ่ง
10.	Ban Dong Charoen	บ้านดงเจริญ
11.	Ban Dong Tai Phatthana	บ้านดงใต้พัฒนา

=== Local administration ===
The whole area of the subdistrict is covered by the subdistrict municipality (thesaban tambon) Wang Phang (เทศบาลตำบลวังผาง).
