= Makok subdistrict =

Makok มะกอก
- Subdistrict
- Country: Thailand
- Province: Lamphun
- District: Pa Sang

Population (2005)
  - Total: 5,705
- Time zone: UTC+7 (ICT)

Makok (Thai: มะกอก, pronounced [mā.kɔ̀ːk]) is a village and tambon (subdistrict) of Pa Sang district, in Lamphun province, Thailand. In 2005 it had a population of 5,705 people. The tambon contains nine villages.
