= Wang Nuea district =

Wang Nuea วังเหนือ
- District
- District location in Lampang province
- Coordinates: 19°8′42″N 99°37′12″E
- Country: Thailand
- Province: Lampang
- Seat: Wang Nuea
- District established: 1938

Area
  - Total: 1,034.3 km^{2} (399.3 sq mi)

Population (2016)
  - Total: 44,542
  - Density: 43.4/km^{2} (112/sq mi)
- Time zone: UTC+7 (ICT)
- Postal code: 52140
- Geocode: 5207

Wang Nuea (Thai: วังเหนือ, pronounced [wāŋ nɯ̌a̯]) is the northernmost district (amphoe) of Lampang province, northern Thailand.

== Geography ==
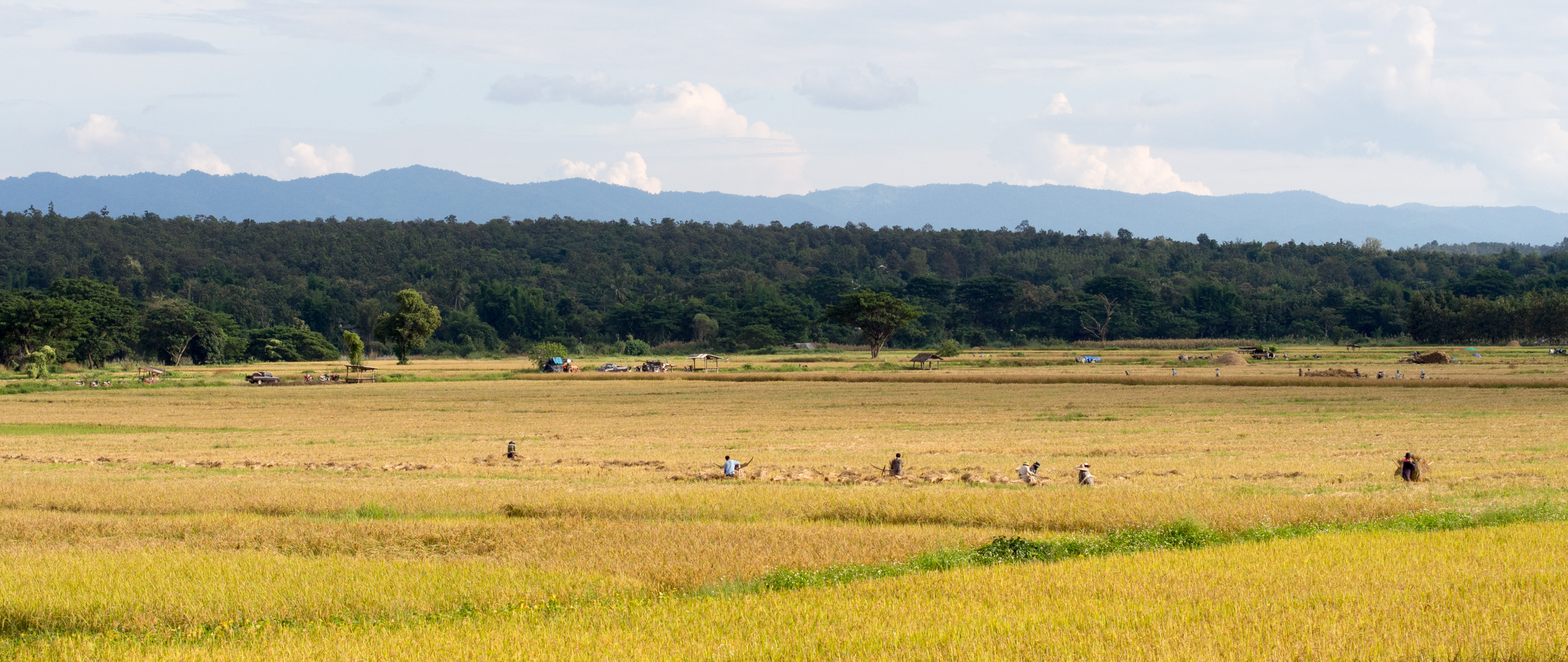
Rice harvest in Wang Nuea District with the mountains of the Phi Pan Nam Range in the distance

Neighboring districts are (from the east clockwise) Mae Chai and Mueang Phayao of Phayao province, Ngao, Chae Hom and Mueang Pan of Lampang Province, Wiang Pa Pao and Phan of Chiang Rai province.

Mountains dominate the landscape of the district, the Khun Tan Range on the western side and the Phi Pan Nam Range on the eastern.

== History ==
Till 1904 the district Chae Hom was named Wang Nuea. A new minor district (king amphoe) Wang Nuea was established on 15 May 1938 as a subordinate of Chae Hom district. It was upgraded to a full district in 1958.

== Administration ==
=== Central administration ===
Wang Nuea is subdivided into eight subdistricts (tambons), which are further subdivided into 80 administrative villages (mubans).

No.	Name	Thai	Villages	Pop.
1.	Thung Hua	ทุ่งฮั้ว	12	5,489
2.	Wang Nuea	วังเหนือ	9	6,963
3.	Wang Tai	วังใต้	7	3,320
4.	Rong Kho	ร่องเคาะ	17	10,978
5.	Wang Thong	วังทอง	9	5,198
6.	Wang Sai	วังซ้าย	10	5,039
7.	Wang Kaeo	วังแก้ว	7	3,423
8.	Wang Sai Kham	วังทรายคำ	9	4,132

=== Local administration ===
There are two subdistrict municipalities (Thesaban Tambons) in the district:

- Ban Mai (Thai: เทศบาลตำบลบ้านใหม่) consisting of parts of subdistrict Wang Nuea.
- Wang Nuea (Thai: เทศบาลตำบลวังเหนือ) consisting of parts of subdistrict Wang Nuea.

There are eight subdistrict administrative organizations (SAO) in the district:

- Thung Hua (Thai: องค์การบริหารส่วนตำบลทุ่งฮั้ว) consisting of subdistrict Thung Hua.
- Wang Nuea (Thai: องค์การบริหารส่วนตำบลวังเหนือ) consisting of parts of subdistrict Wang Nuea.
- Wang Tai (Thai: องค์การบริหารส่วนตำบลวังใต้) consisting of subdistrict Wang Tai.
- Rong Kho (Thai: องค์การบริหารส่วนตำบลร่องเคาะ) consisting of subdistrict Rong Kho.
- Wang Thong (Thai: องค์การบริหารส่วนตำบลวังทอง) consisting of subdistrict Wang Thong.
- Wang Sai (Thai: องค์การบริหารส่วนตำบลวังซ้าย) consisting of subdistrict Wang Sai.
- Wang Kaeo (Thai: องค์การบริหารส่วนตำบลวังแก้ว) consisting of subdistrict Wang Kaeo.
- Wang Sai Kham (Thai: องค์การบริหารส่วนตำบลวังทรายคำ) consisting of subdistrict Wang Sai Kham.
