= Mae Tha district, Lampang =

Mae Tha แม่ทะ
- District
- District location in Lampang province
- Coordinates: 18°8′6″N 99°30′48″E
- Country: Thailand
- Province: Lampang
- Tambon: 10
- Muban: 95

Area
  - Total: 810.543 km^{2} (312.952 sq mi)

Population (2015)
  - Total: 59,357
  - Density: 77.8/km^{2} (202/sq mi)
- Time zone: UTC+7 (ICT)
- Postal code: 52150
- Geocode: 5210

Mae Tha (Thai: แม่ทะ, pronounced [mɛ̂ː tʰáʔ]) is a district (amphoe) of Lampang province, northern Thailand.

== Geography ==
Neighboring districts are (from the south clockwise): Sop Prap, Ko Kha, Mueang Lampang, Mae Mo of Lampang Province, Long and Wang Chin of Phrae province.

The Phi Pan Nam Mountains dominate the landscape of the district.

== Administration ==
=== Central administration ===
Mae Tha is subdivided into 10 sub-districts (tambons), which are further subdivided into 95 administrative villages (mubans).

No.	Name	Thai	Villages	Pop.
1.	Mae Tha	แม่ทะ	10	6,863
2.	Na Khrua	นาครัว	12	10,099
3.	Pa Tan	ป่าตัน	9	6,171
4.	Ban Kio	บ้านกิ่ว	10	4,430
5.	Ban Bom	บ้านบอม	6	2,693
6.	Nam Cho	น้ำโจ้	10	9,967
7.	Don Fai	ดอนไฟ	8	4,284
8.	Hua Suea	หัวเสือ	12	6,442
10.	Wang Ngoen	วังเงิน	9	3,668
11.	San Don Kaeo	สันดอนแก้ว	9	4,740

The missing number 9 belongs to tambon Sop Pat, which is now part of the District Mae Mo.

=== Local administration ===
There are five sub-district municipalities (thesaban tambons) in the district:

- Pa Tan Na Khrua (Thai: เทศบาลตำบลป่าตันนาครัว) consisting of sub-district Pa Tan and parts of sub-district Na Khrua.
- Siri Rat (Thai: เทศบาลตำบลสิริราช) consisting of sub-district San Don Kaeo.
- Mae Tha (Thai: เทศบาลตำบลแม่ทะ) consisting of sub-district Mae Tha.
- Nam Cho (Thai: เทศบาลตำบลน้ำโจ้) consisting of sub-district Nam Cho.
- Na Khrua (Thai: เทศบาลตำบลนาครัว) consisting of parts of sub-district Na Khrua.

There are five sub-district administrative organizations (SAO) in the district:

- Ban Kio (Thai: องค์การบริหารส่วนตำบลบ้านกิ่ว) consisting of sub-district Ban Kio.
- Ban Bom (Thai: องค์การบริหารส่วนตำบลบ้านบอม) consisting of sub-district Ban Bom.
- Don Fai (Thai: องค์การบริหารส่วนตำบลดอนไฟ) consisting of sub-district Don Fai.
- Hua Suea (Thai: องค์การบริหารส่วนตำบลหัวเสือ) consisting of sub-district Hua Suea.
- Wang Ngoen (Thai: องค์การบริหารส่วนตำบลวังเงิน) consisting of sub-district Wang Ngoen.
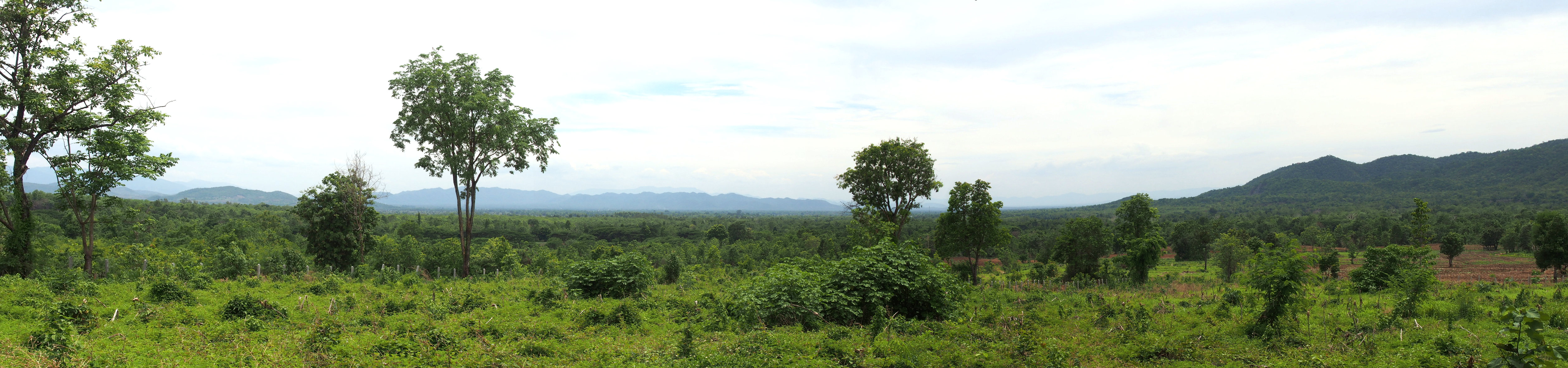
The Mae Tha valley from Hwy 11. The hills in the distance are the western fringes of the Phi Pan Nam Range
