= Ko Kha district =

Ko Kha เกาะคา
- District
- District location in Lampang province
- Coordinates: 18°11′30″N 99°23′44″E
- Country: Thailand
- Province: Lampang
- Seat: Tha Pha

Area
  - Total: 551.2 km^{2} (212.8 sq mi)

Population (2005)
  - Total: 63,870
  - Density: 115.9/km^{2} (300/sq mi)
- Time zone: UTC+7 (ICT)
- Postal code: 52130
- Geocode: 5203

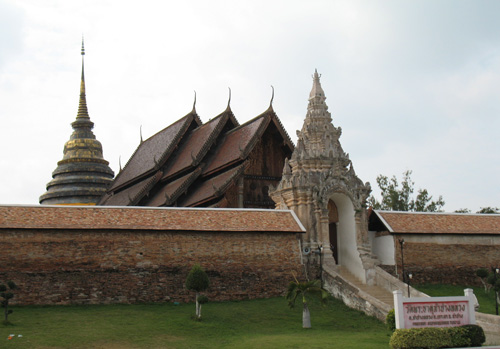
Wat Phra That Lampang Luang

Ko Kha (Thai: เกาะคา, pronounced [kɔ̀ʔ kʰāː]; Northern Thai: ᨠᩰᩬᩡᨤᩣ, pronounced [kɔ̌ʔ kʰāː]) is a district (amphoe) in the central part of Lampang province, northern Thailand.

== Geography ==
Neighboring districts are (from the south clockwise): Sop Prap, Soem Ngam, Hang Chat, Mueang Lampang, Mae Tha of Lampang Province.

The Khun Tan Range rises in the west and the Phi Pan Nam Range in the east of the district.

== History ==
In 1917, the district was renamed from Sop Yao (สบยาว) to Ko Kha.

== Administration ==
The district is divided into nine subdistricts (tambons), which are further subdivided into 73 villages (mubans). Ko Kha is a township (thesaban tambon) which covers parts of tambons Ko Kha, Sala, and Tha Pha. There are a further nine tambon administrative organizations (TAO).

No.	Name	Thai name	Villages	Pop.
1.	Lampang Luang	ลำปางหลวง	12	9,965
2.	Na Kaeo	นาแก้ว	8	10,092
3.	Lai Hin	ไหล่หิน	6	5,657
4.	Wang Phrao	วังพร้าว	7	7,242
5.	Sala	ศาลา	7	8,732
6.	Ko Kha	เกาะคา	8	4,352
7.	Na Saeng	นาแส่ง	7	4,999
8.	Tha Pha	ท่าผา	9	7,423
9.	Mai Phatthana	ใหม่พัฒนา	9	5,408
