= Phan district =

District of Thailand

Phan พาน
- District
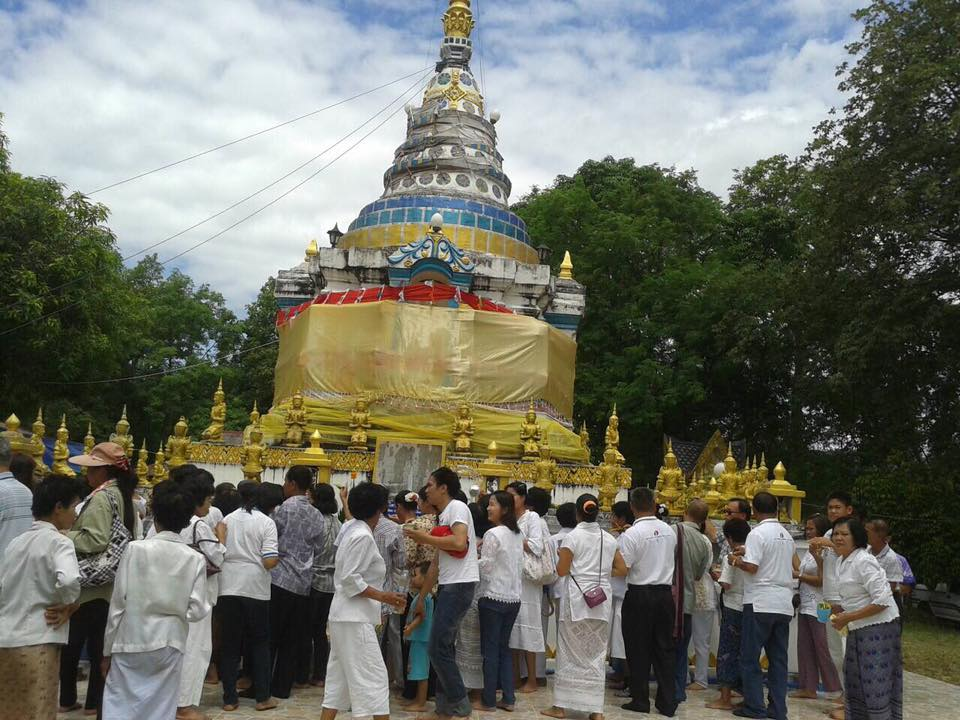
- Local people gathering at Wat Phra Thart Chom Chaeng to make merit

- District location in Chiang Rai province
- Coordinates: 19°33′14″N 99°44′26″E
- Country: Thailand
- Province: Chiang Rai
- Seat: Mueang Phan

Area
  - Total: 1,023.0 km^{2} (395.0 sq mi)

Population (2005)
  - Total: 128,143
  - Density: 125.3/km^{2} (325/sq mi)
- Time zone: UTC+7 (ICT)
- Postal code: 57120
- Geocode: 5705

Phan (Thai: พาน; pronounced [pʰāːn]; Northern Thai: ᨻᩕᩣ᩠ᨶ, pronounced [pāːn]) is a district (amphoe) in the southern part of Chiang Rai province, northern Thailand.

== Geography ==
Neighboring districts are (from the south west clockwise): Wiang Pa Pao, Mae Suai, Mae Lao, Mueang Chiang Rai, and Pa Daet of Chiang Rai Province; Mae Chai of Phayao province; and Wang Nuea of Lampang province.

The mountains of the Phi Pan Nam Range dominate the landscape of the district.

== History ==
Originally named Mueang Phan, it was renamed Phan in 1938, as the word mueang was then reserved for the capital districts of the provinces.

== Administration ==
=== Central administration ===
The district Phan is subdivided into 15 subdistricts (Tambon), which are further subdivided into 236 administrative villages (Muban).

No.	Name	Thai	Villages	Pop.
1.	San Makhet	สันมะเค็ด	21	10,206
2.	Mae O	แม่อ้อ	20	9,179
3.	Than Thong	ธารทอง	11	6,461
4.	Santi Suk	สันติสุข	9	5,184
5.	Doi Ngam	ดอยงาม	14	6,152
6.	Hua Ngom	หัวง้ม	13	6,712
7.	Charoen Mueang	เจริญเมือง	22	8,302
8.	Pa Hung	ป่าหุ่ง	18	10,480
9.	Muang Kham	ม่วงคำ	17	8,000
10.	Sai Khao	ทรายขาว	17	9,667
11.	San Klang	สันกลาง	18	8,609
12.	Mae Yen	แม่เย็น	11	5,436
13.	Mueang Phan	เมืองพาน	25	18,463
14.	Than Tawan	ทานตะวัน	12	5,887
15.	Wiang Hao	เวียงห้าว	8	3,355

=== Local administration ===
There are 2 subdistrict municipalities (Thesaban Tambon) in the district:

- Mueang Phan (Thai: เทศบาลตำบลเมืองพาน) consisting of parts of the subdistrict Mueang Phan.
- San Makhet (Thai: เทศบาลตำบลสันมะเค็ด) consisting of the complete subdistrict San Makhet.

There are 14 subdistrict administrative organizations (SAO) in the district:

- Mae O (Thai: องค์การบริหารส่วนตำบลแม่อ้อ) consisting of the complete subdistrict Mae O.
- Than Thong (Thai: องค์การบริหารส่วนตำบลธารทอง) consisting of the complete subdistrict Than Thong.
- Santi Suk (Thai: องค์การบริหารส่วนตำบลสันติสุข) consisting of the complete subdistrict Santi Suk.
- Doi Ngam (Thai: องค์การบริหารส่วนตำบลดอยงาม) consisting of the complete subdistrict Doi Ngam.
- Hua Ngom (Thai: องค์การบริหารส่วนตำบลหัวง้ม) consisting of the complete subdistrict Hua Ngom.
- Charoen Mueang (Thai: องค์การบริหารส่วนตำบลเจริญเมือง) consisting of the complete subdistrict Charoen Mueang.
- Pa Hung (Thai: องค์การบริหารส่วนตำบลป่าหุ่ง) consisting of the complete subdistrict Pa Hung.
- Muang Kham (Thai: องค์การบริหารส่วนตำบลม่วงคำ) consisting of the complete subdistrict Muang Kham.
- Sai Khao (Thai: องค์การบริหารส่วนตำบลทรายขาว) consisting of the complete subdistrict Sai Khao.
- San Klang (Thai: องค์การบริหารส่วนตำบลสันกลาง) consisting of the complete subdistrict San Klang.
- Mae Yen (Thai: องค์การบริหารส่วนตำบลแม่เย็น) consisting of the complete subdistrict Mae Yen.
- Mueang Phan (Thai: องค์การบริหารส่วนตำบลเมืองพาน) consisting of parts of the subdistrict Mueang Phan.
- Than Tawan (Thai: องค์การบริหารส่วนตำบลทานตะวัน) consisting of the complete subdistrict Than Tawan.
- Wiang Hao (Thai: องค์การบริหารส่วนตำบลเวียงห้าว) consisting of the complete subdistrict Wiang Hao.
