= Talat =

Talat or Talaat may refer to:

== Name ==
- Talat (given name), includes Tallat and Talât
- Wael Talaat (1964–2025), Egyptian snooker player

== Geographic designations ==
- Talat Sao, a morning market in Vientiane, Laos

=== Thailand ===
- Pak Khlong Talat, a market in Bangkok that sells flowers, fruits, and vegetables
- Talat Chaiya, a subdistrict municipality in Chaiya District, Surat Thani Province
- Talat Khwan, a subdistrict of Doi Saket District, in Chiang Mai Province
- Talat Yai, a subdistrict of Doi Saket District, Chiang Mai Province
- Yang Talat District, a district in Kalasin Province
- Talat, a subdistrict of Mueang Chanthaburi District, Chanthaburi
- Talat, a subdistrict of Mueang Nakhon Ratchasima District, Nakhon Ratchasima
- Talat, a subdistrict of Mueang Maha Sarakham District, Maha Sarakham
- Talat, a subdistrict of Mueang Surat Thani District, Surat Thani
- Talat, a subdistrict of Phra Pradaeng District, Samut Prakan
