= Doi Saket district =

Doi Saket ดอยสะเก็ด
- District
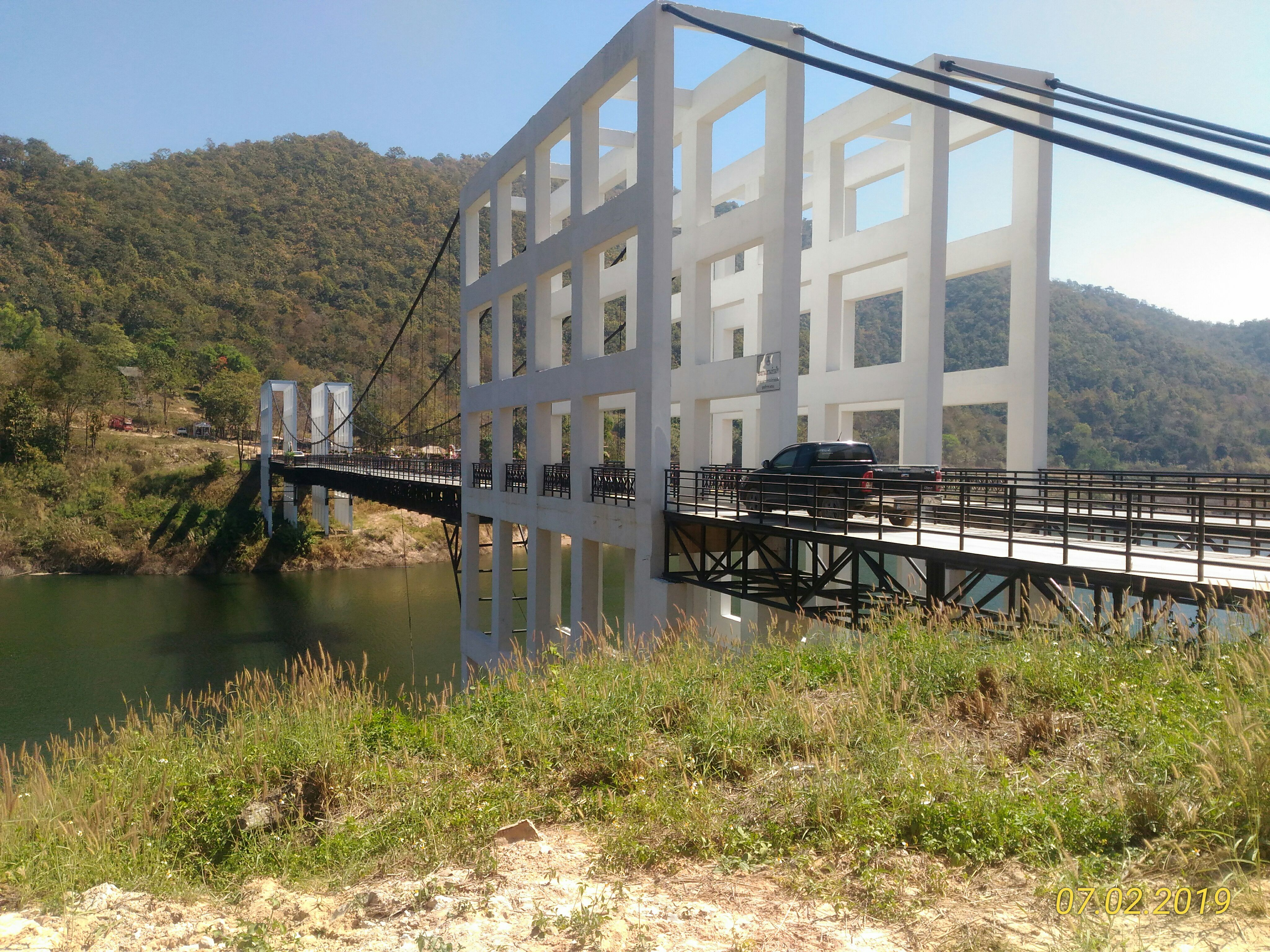
- A suspension bridge over the Mae Kuang Udom Thara Dam

- District location in Chiang Mai province
- Coordinates: 18°52′13″N 99°8′12″E
- Country: Thailand
- Province: Chiang Mai
- Seat: Doi Saket
- Tambon: 14
- Muban: 110
- District established: 1902

Area
  - Total: 671.3 km^{2} (259.2 sq mi)

Population (2005)
  - Total: 64,116
  - Density: 95.5/km^{2} (247/sq mi)
- Time zone: UTC+7 (ICT)
- Postal code: 50220
- Geocode: 5005

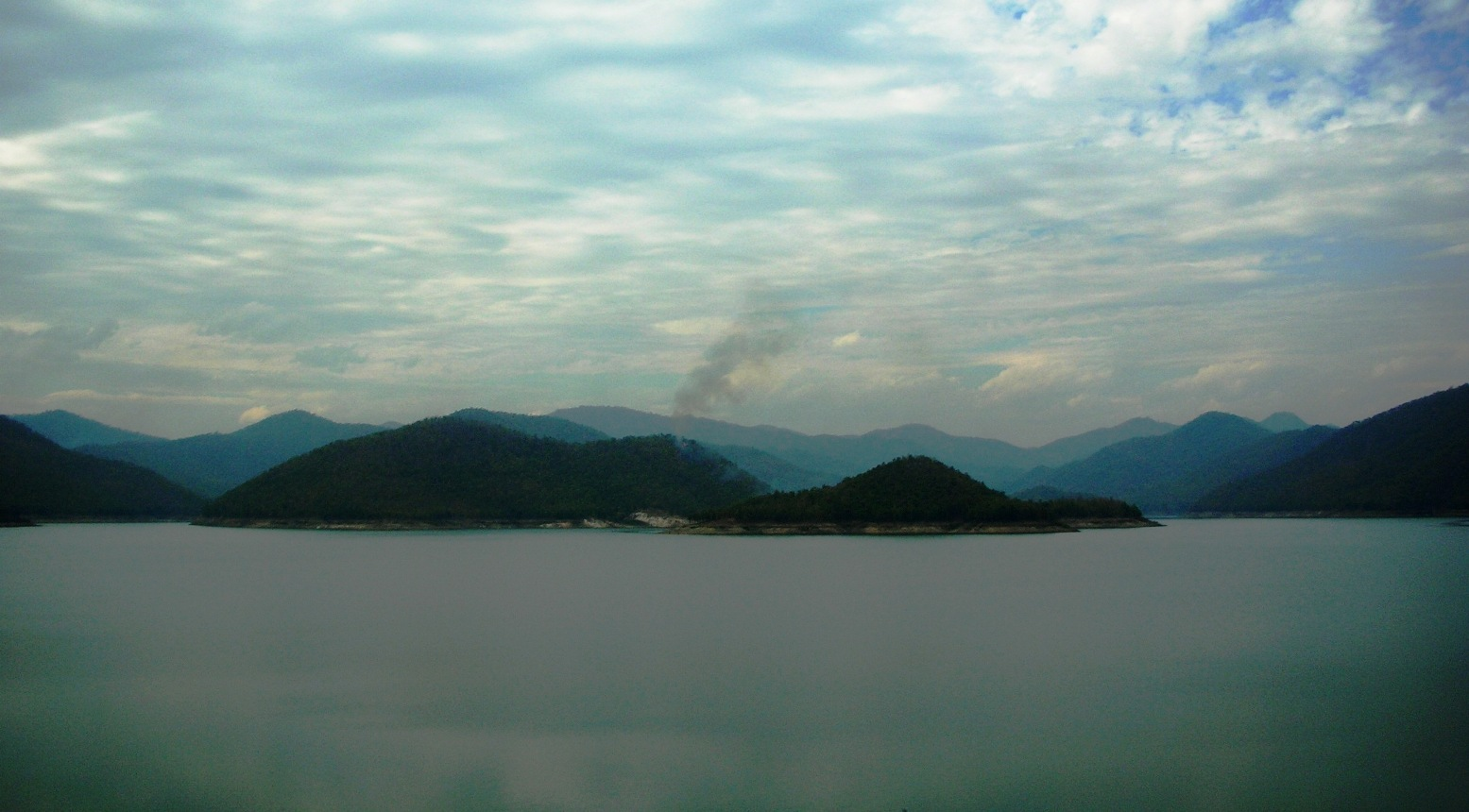
Mae Kuang Dam (เขื่อนแม่กวงอุดมธารา), Doi Saket with the Khun Tan Range in the background and a seasonal wildfire

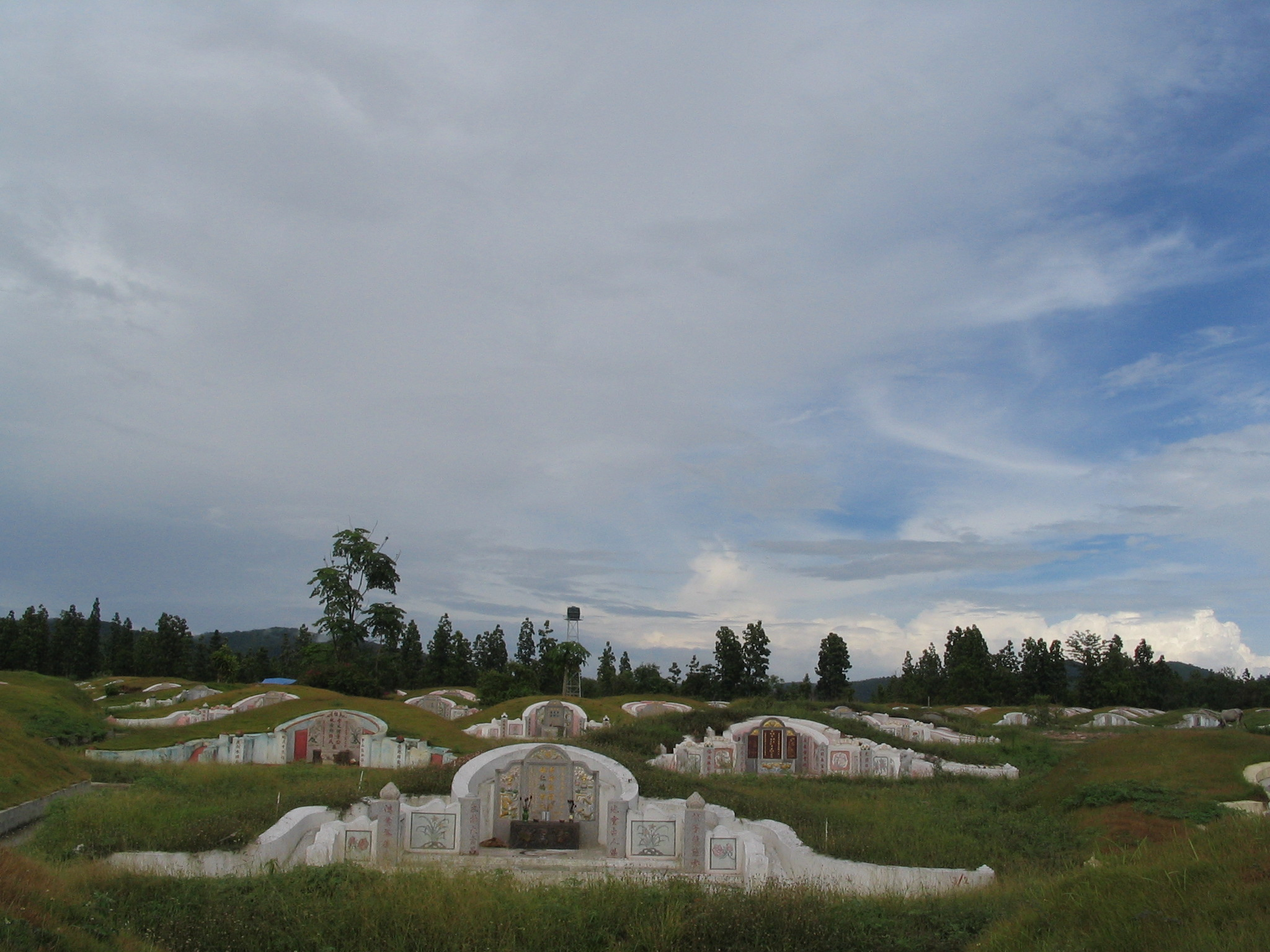
Chinese Cemetery in the Thai highlands near Doi Saket

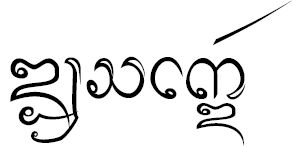
Doi Saket (Thai: ดอยสะเก็ด, pronounced [dɔ̄ːj sā.kèt]; Northern Thai: ดอยสะเก๋ด, pronounced [dɔ̄ːj sā.kět]) is a district (amphoe) in the eastern part of Chiang Mai province in northern Thailand. The district is predominantly a rural farming area, containing a mixture of rice fields on the valley floor to orchard and other farming on the hillsides. The village is known for its Wat Phra That Doi Saket that has remarkable murals inside.

== History ==
The district was established in 1902.

== Geography ==
Neighboring districts are (from the south clockwise) Mae On, San Kamphaeng, San Sai, Mae Taeng, Phrao of Chiang Mai province, Wiang Pa Pao of Chiang Rai province and Mueang Pan of Lampang province.

The district is named after 1,816 m high Doi Saket (ดอยสะเก็ด), a mountain of the Khun Tan Range on the east side of the district.

== Administration ==
The district is divided into 14 sub-districts (tambons), which are further subdivided into 110 villages (mubans). Doi Saket is a township (thesaban tambon), which covers parts of tambon Choeng Doi and Luang Nuea. There are a further 13 tambon administrative organizations (TAO).

No.	Name	Thai name	Villages	Pop.
1.	Choeng Doi	เชิงดอย	13	10,750
2.	San Pu Loei	สันปูเลย	14	9,137
3.	Luang Nuea	ลวงเหนือ	10	6,330
4.	Pa Pong	ป่าป้อง	7	3,549
5.	Sa-nga Ban	สง่าบ้าน	5	2,225
6.	Pa Lan	ป่าลาน	6	1,993
7.	Talat Khwan	ตลาดขวัญ	6	3,418
8.	Samran Rat	สำราญราษฎร์	8	3,366
9.	Mae Khue	แม่คือ	6	4,797
10.	Talat Yai	ตลาดใหญ่	5	3,760
11.	Mae Hoi Ngoen	แม่ฮ้อยเงิน	6	3,848
12.	Mae Pong	แม่โป่ง	10	5,589
13.	Pa Miang	ป่าเมี่ยง	6	3,638
14.	Thep Sadet	เทพเสด็จ	8	1,716
