= Talat Khwan =

Talat Khwan may refer to:

- Talat Khwan, a former name of the city of Nonthaburi in Thailand
  - Talat Khwan, a former name of Mueang Nonthaburi District, Nonthaburi Province
  - Talat Khwan, Nonthaburi, a subdistrict (tambon) of Mueang Nonthaburi District
- Talat Khwan, Chiang Mai, a subdistrict (tambon) of Doi Saket District, Chiang Mai Province
