= Samran Rat Subdistrict =

Samran Rat Subdistrict may refer to:

- Samran Rat, a neighbourhood and subdistrict (khwaeng) in Bangkok
- Samran Rat, Chiang Mai, a subdistrict (tambon) in Doi Saket District, Chiang Mai Province
