= Talat (given name) =

- Gender: Male
- Language: Arabic, Turkish, Persian, Urdu

Origin
- Origin: Arabic
- Meaning: Beauty
- Region of origin: Middle East

Other names
- Alternative spelling: Talaat, Tal'at, Talât

Talat (also transliterated as Talaat and Tal'at; Ottoman Turkish: طلعت; Turkish: Talât; Arabic: طلعة) is an Arabic male given name used in Turkey, Egypt, Pakistan, India, Iran and the Levant. Notable people with the name include:

== Given name ==
- Talaat Pasha (1874–1921), leader of the Ottoman Empire during the First World War, and perpetrator of the Armenian genocide
- Mehmet Ali Talat (born 1952), President of the Turkish Republic of Northern Cyprus
- Talât Aydemir (1917–1964), Turkish general
- Talaat Afifi, Egyptian academic
- Talat Ahmad (born 1955), Indian geologist
- Talat Ali (born 1950), Pakistani cricketer
- Talat Aziz (born 1956), ghazal singer from Hyderabad, India
- Talaat Harb (1867–1941), Egyptian industrialist and banker
- Talât Sait Halman (1931–2014), Turkish poet, translator and cultural historian
- Talat Hussain (disambiguation)
  - Talat Hussain (actor) (1945–2024), Pakistani actor
  - Syed Talat Hussain (born 1966), executive director of AAJ Television
- Talat Gasimov (khananda) (1933–2013), Azerbaijani khananda, People's Artiste of Azerbaijan
- Talat Mahmood (1924–1998), Indian playback singer and film actor
- Talat Masood (born 1932), general in the Pakistan Army Corps of Engineers
- Talat Othman (born 1936), Palestinian-American businessman, investor, and Republican fundraiser
- Tal'at Fu'ad Qasim (1957–1995), leader of Egypt's militant Gama'a Islamiyya organization
- Talat Tuncel (born 1964), Turkish football manager and former footballer
- Talat Tunçalp (1915–2017), Turkish Olympian road cyclist
- Telat Üzüm (born 1963), Turkish football manager
- Talat Yaqoob, Scottish activist
- Talat Xhaferi (born 1962), Macedonian politician and former Prime Minister
