= Wat Phra That Doi Saket =

Thai Buddhist temple

Coordinates: 18.872269°N 99.140049°E

- วัดพระธาตุดอยสะเก็ด
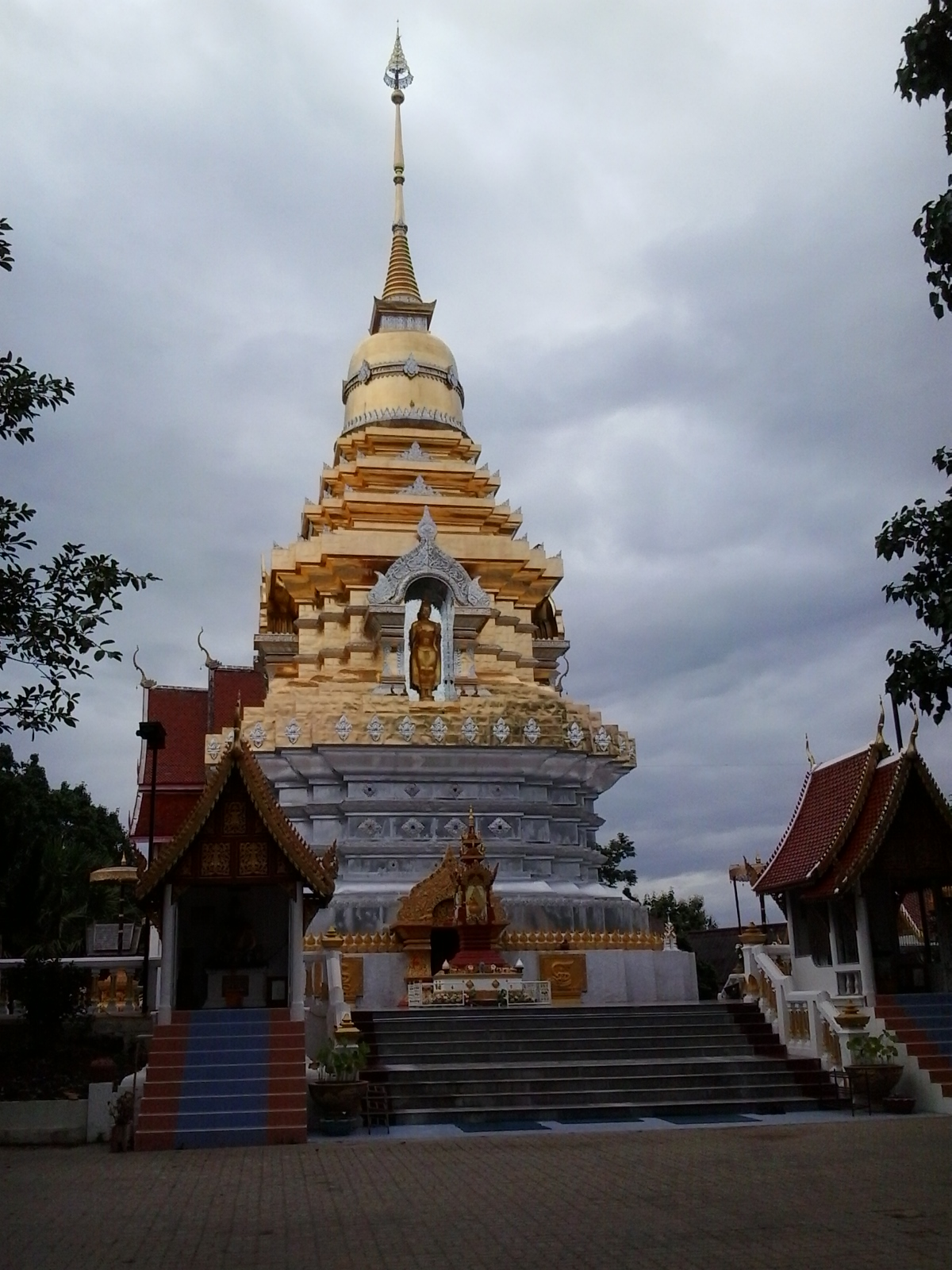

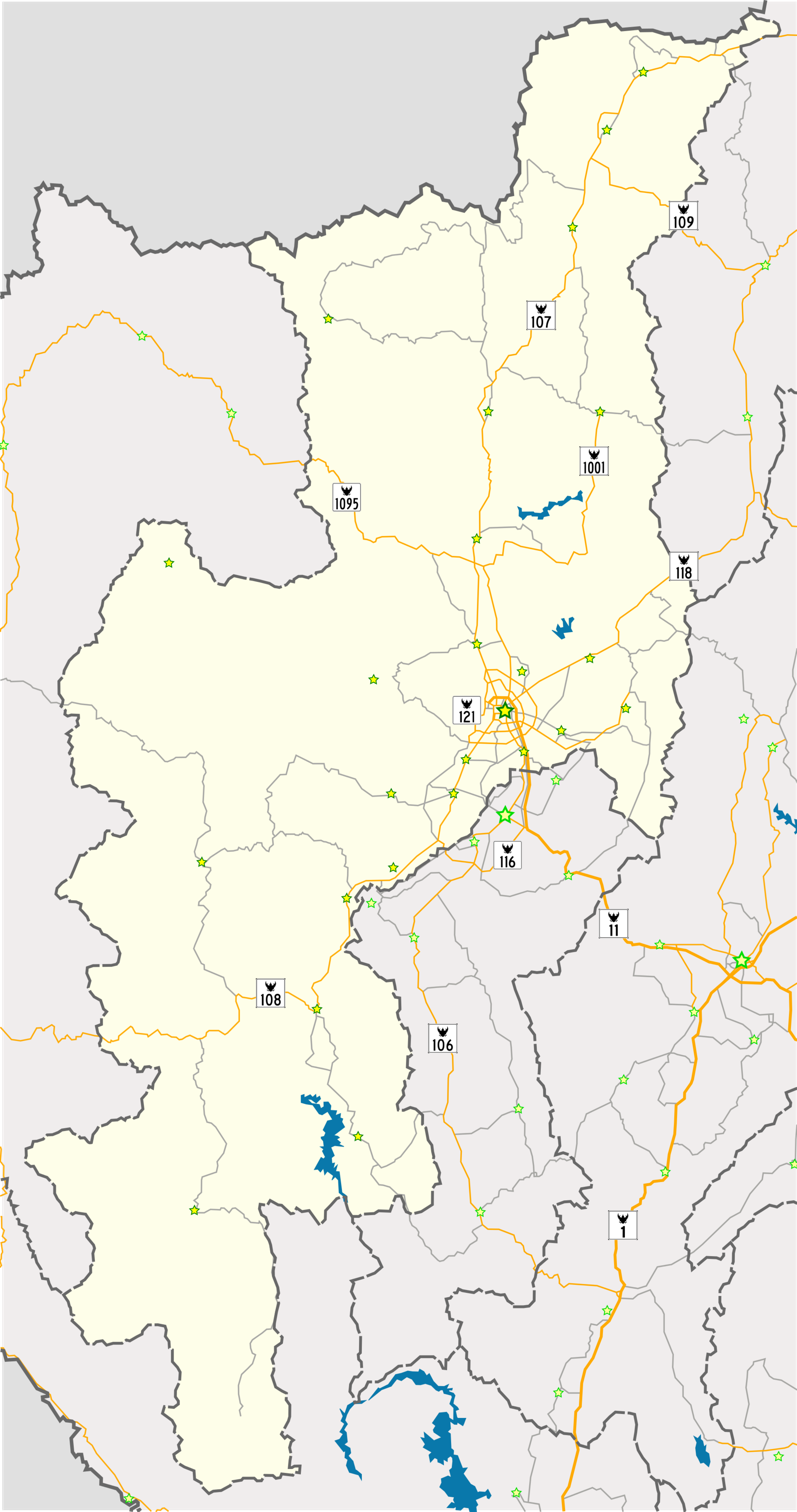
- Location within Chiang Mai Province Location within Thailand

Religion
- Affiliation: Buddhism
- District: Doi Saket district
- Province: Chiang Mai Province
- Region: Northern Thailand
- Status: Active

Location
- Municipality: Chiang Mai
- Country: Thailand
- Interactive map of Wat Phra That Doi Saket

Architecture
- Completed: 1612

Wat Phra That Doi Saket (วัดพระธาตุดอยสะเก็ด) is a Buddhist temple located on the 425-meter-high Doi Saket (ดอยสะเก็ด), a mountain in the Khun Tan Range, in Doi Saket district in the eastern part of Chiang Mai Province, Thailand. The pagoda is a 30-meter-high structure built of reinforced concrete that enshrines the sacred hair relics of the Buddha.

== History and legend ==
According to legend, the Buddha visited the mountain (later Doi Saket) and offered his hair upon a nāga. This significant event is believed to have marked the sacred site where the temple was subsequently constructed. The temple is believed to have been built in 1112. The Buddhists initially gathered to worship a stone pagoda. To improve its size and stability, a concrete stupa was later constructed.

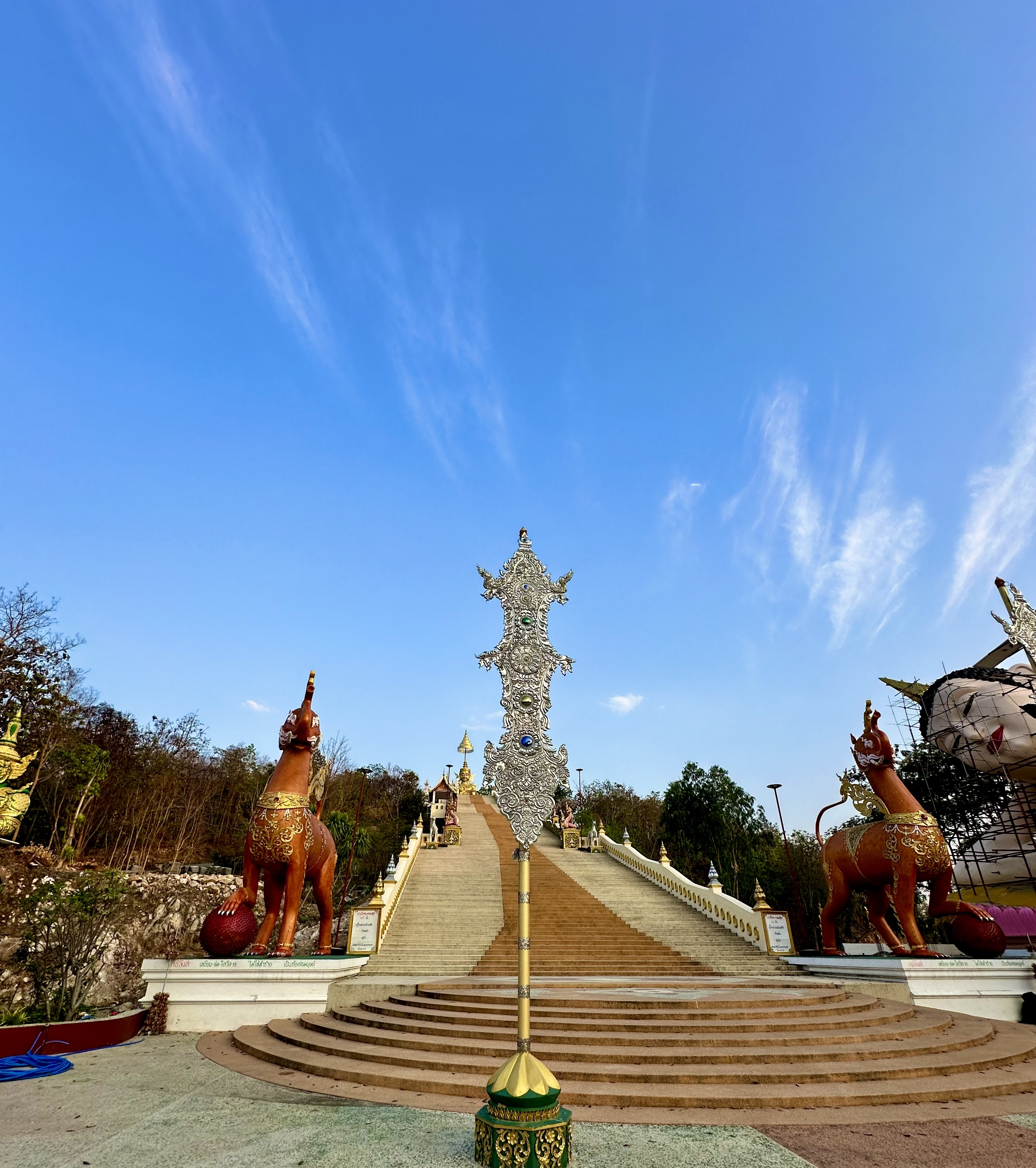
The Buddha image at Wat Phra That Doi Saket

Kruba Kae, a monk from Mueang District in Nan Province, built a vihara and renovated the pagoda, officially establishing the site as a temple named 'Wat Phra That Doi Saket' on January 6, 1612. Over time, villagers settled in the surrounding foothills and nearby areas, prompting the government to establish a district named 'Doi Saket' after the temple. The temple received royal patronage and was granted official third-class royal temple status on February 7, 1918. Every year, on the 15th day of the 6th lunar month, the sacred relics are brought down from their enshrined place for Buddhist devotees to pay their respects.

In 1835, Phor Noi Inthachak renovated the old vihara. Later in 1912, Kruba Chai from Wat Luang Nuea (now Wat Sri Mung Muang) repaired the vihara, improving it and enlarging the pagoda.

In the early 1990s, the artist Khun Chaiwat Wannanon undertook a significant artistic endeavor, painting stunning Buddhist murals on the temple walls. This project spanned over four years.

Near the main pagoda stands a four-faced vihara, constructed in 1977. Within the temple grounds, a footprint believed to be that of the Buddha was discovered in 2013. The footprint is approximately 9 inches long and 4-5 inches wide. A shrine has since been built over the footprint, allowing devotees to pay their respects.

Some of the special murals

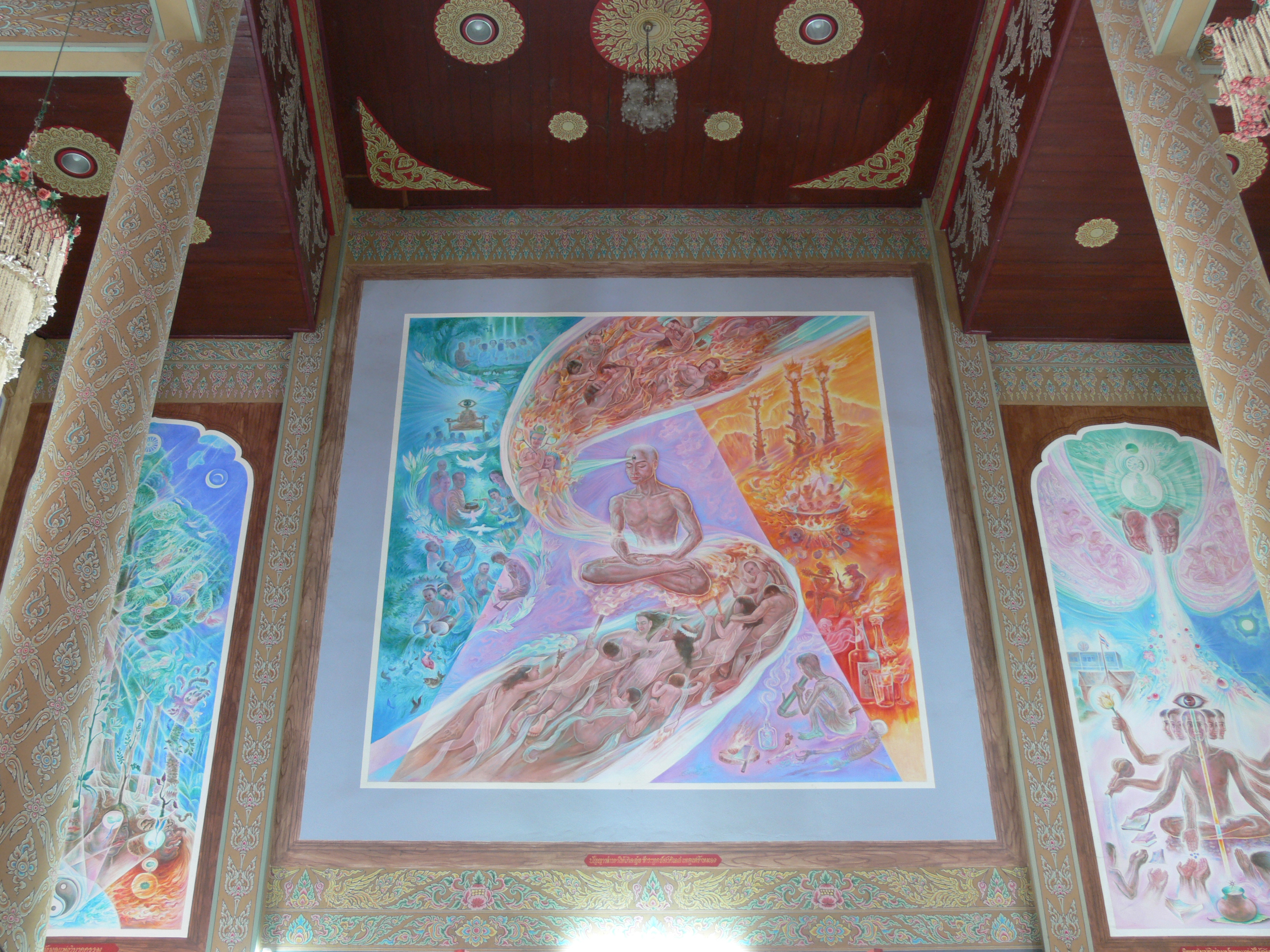

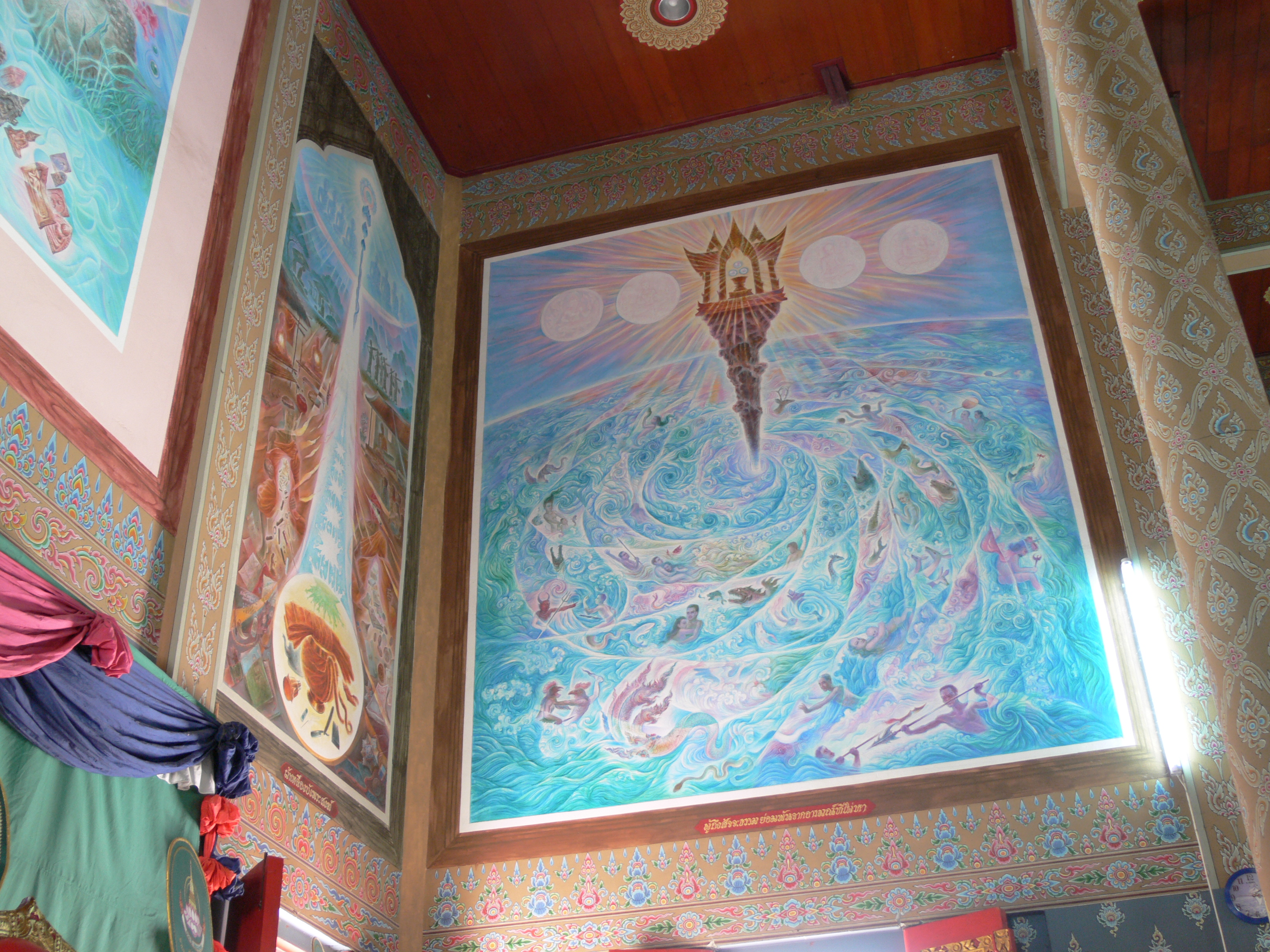

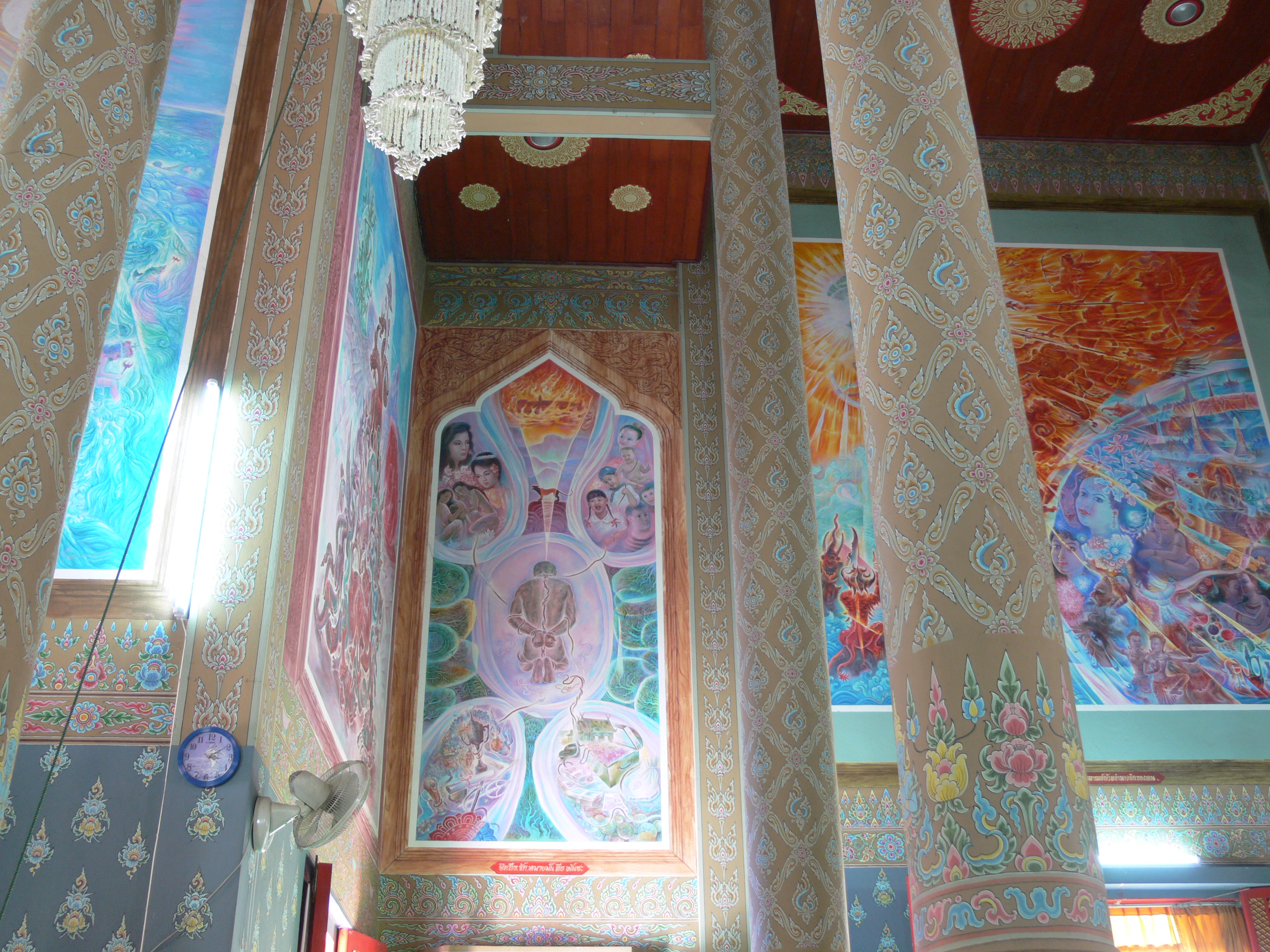

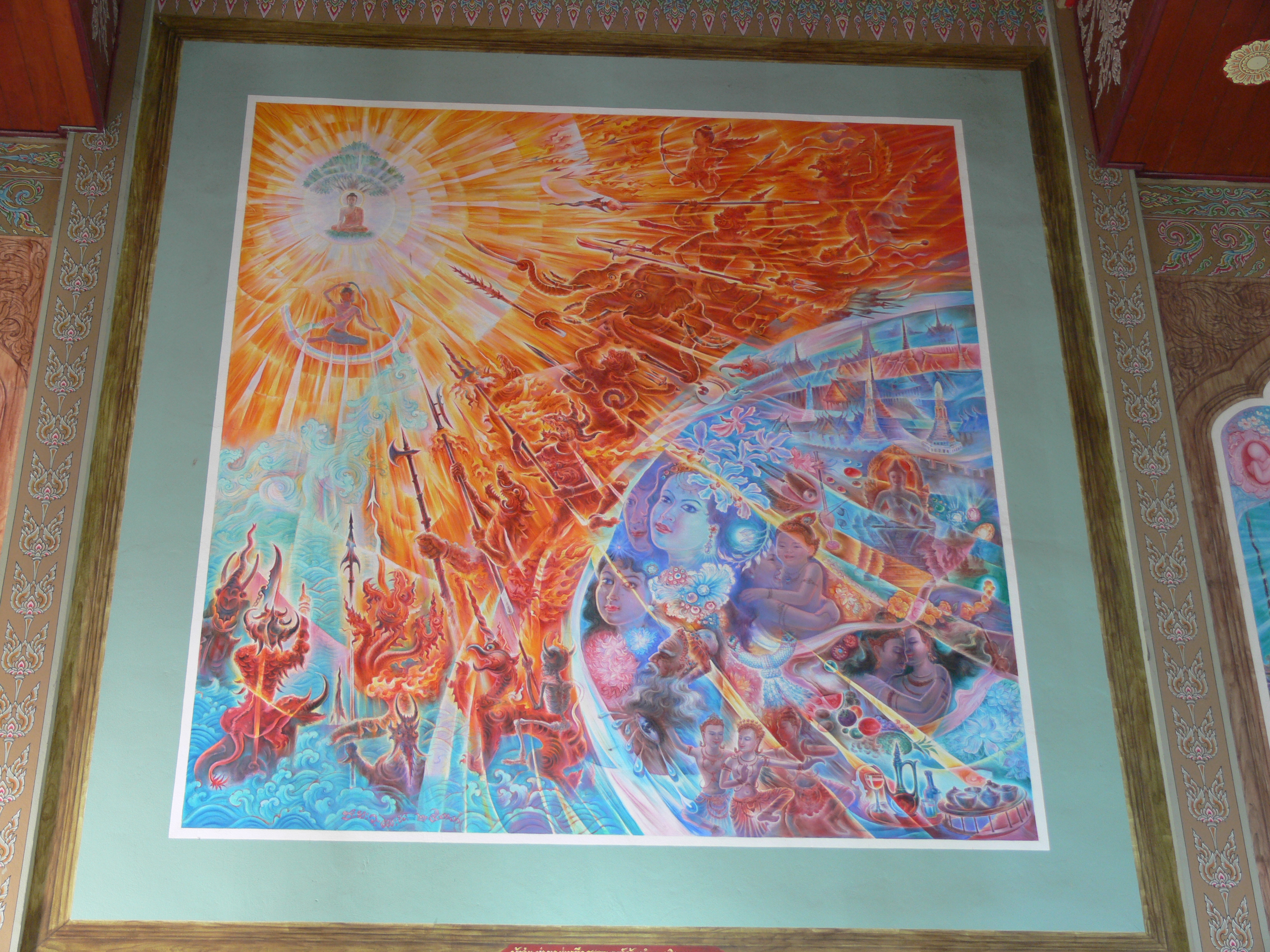

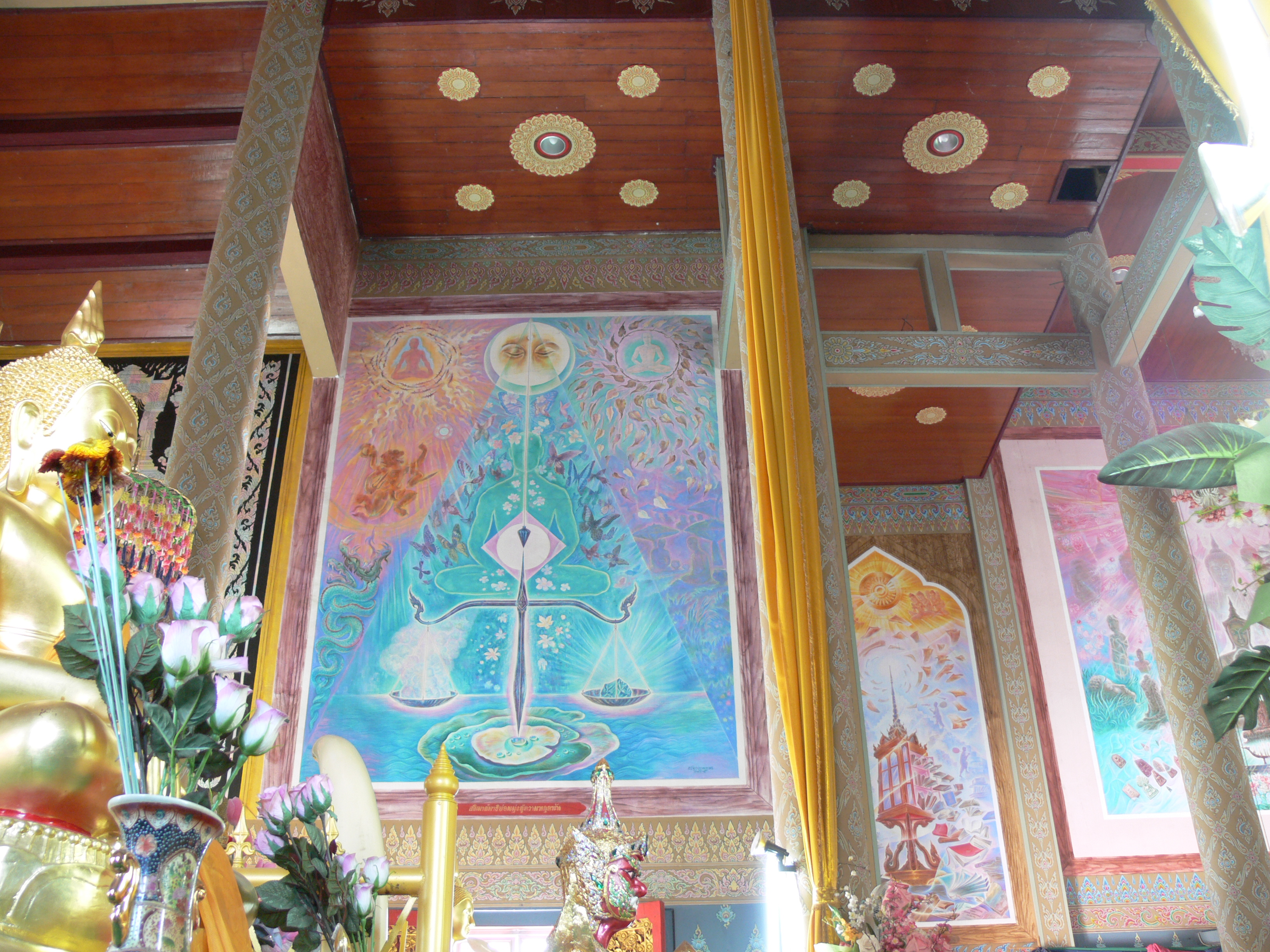

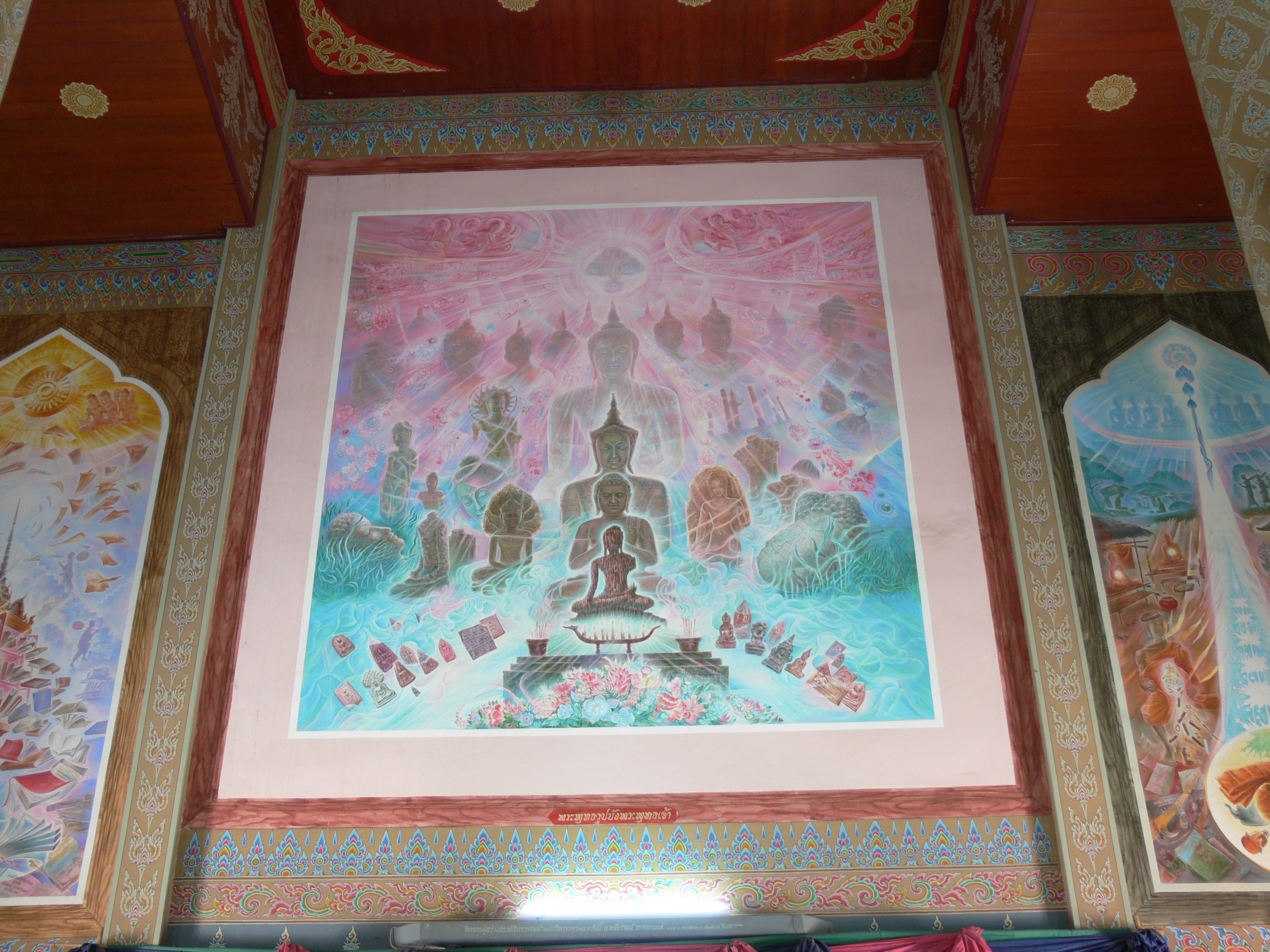
