= Mae Khue =

Mae Khue แม่คือ
- Tambon
- Country: Thailand
- Province: Chiang Mai
- District: Doi Saket

Population (2005)
  - Total: 4,797
- Time zone: UTC+7 (ICT)

Mae Khue (Thai: แม่คือ) is a tambon (subdistrict) of Doi Saket District, in Chiang Mai Province, Thailand. In 2005 it had a population of 4,797 people. The tambon contains six villages.
