= Pa Pong, Chiang Mai =

Coordinates: 18.8437°N 99.1372°E

Pa Pong ป่าป้อง
- Tambon
- Interactive map of Pa Pong
- Country: Thailand
- Province: Chiang Mai
- District: Doi Saket

Population (2005)
  - Total: 3,549
- Time zone: UTC+7 (ICT)

Pa Pong (Thai: ป่าป้อง) is a tambon (subdistrict) of Doi Saket District, in Chiang Mai Province, Thailand. In 2005 it had a population of 3,549 people. The tambon contains seven villages.
