= Luang Nuea, Chiang Mai =

Luang Nuea ลวงเหนือ
- Tambon
- Country: Thailand
- Province: Chiang Mai
- District: Doi Saket

Population (2005)
  - Total: 6,330
- Time zone: UTC+7 (ICT)

Luang Nuea (Thai: ลวงเหนือ) is a tambon (sub-district) of Doi Saket District, in Chiang Mai Province, Thailand. In 2005 it had a population of 6,330 people. The tambon contains 10 villages.
