= San Pu Loei =

San Pu Loei สันปูเลย
- Tambon
- Country: Thailand
- Province: Chiang Mai
- District: Doi Saket

Population (2005)
  - Total: 9,137
- Time zone: UTC+7 (ICT)

San Pu Loei (Thai: สันปูเลย) is a tambon (subdistrict) of Doi Saket District, in Chiang Mai Province, Thailand. In 2005 it had a population of 9,137 people. The tambon contains 14 villages.
