= Thep Sadet =

Thep Sadet เทพเสด็จ
- Tambon
- Country: Thailand
- Province: Chiang Mai
- District: Doi Saket

Population (2005)
  - Total: 1,716
- Time zone: UTC+7 (ICT)

Thep Sadet (Thai: เทพเสด็จ) is a tambon (subdistrict) of Doi Saket District, in Chiang Mai Province, Thailand. In 2005 it had a population of 1,716 people. The tambon contains eight villages.

Thep-Sadet Sub-district has been established as a community for at least 100 years. who migrated to the area to cultivate rice fields and make miang gardens Later, when the era of Miang trading flourished. More and more cattle traders came in to trade. As a result, the indigenous people living in the plains migrated to live in the area to hire more Deb Miang, plant Miang garden and trade. Subsequently there was a mix of ethnicities. In addition, the Khmu tribes have migrated to other places. Until now have become all native people.

Originally, Thep Sadet Subdistrict was in the administrative area of Tambon Pa Miang. Doi Saket District Chiang Mai Province When the area of Tambon Pa Miang has increased in population Moreover, Thep Sadet Sub-district is very far away. As a result, the supervision and administration of the administration could not be thorough. In 1985, Mr. Sawang Chantiang, who at that time held the position of the village headman of Ban Pang Hai, Village No. 12, was of the opinion that in order to ensure thorough supervision of the people therefore proceeded to inform the Doi Saket District Office to request a new administrative division There are 7 villages in the mountainous area, which are Ban Pang Bong Village No. 5, Ban Nam Khong Village Village No. 6, Ban Pan Ban Village No. 7, Ban Mae Ton Village Village No. 8, Ban Dong Village Village No. 9., Ban Pong Thong, Village No. 10 and Ban Pang Hai Village No. 12, separated into a new sub-district in 1991 under the name "Thep Sadet Subdistrict" The reason for using this name is because the entire area of Tambon Thepsadet is a high mountain. Which is in the area of the Pa Miang Royal Project, located at Ban Pang Bong, Village No. 5, where Her Royal Highness Princess Maha Chakri Sirindhorn His Highness visited the project twice through Thep Sadet Subdistrict Council. Consequently, it was decided to use the name of the sub-district "Thepsadet" with the administrative boundaries of 7 such villages. The new village administrative divisions are as follows: Village No. 1, Ban Pang Bong, Village No. 2, Ban Nam Khong, Village No. 3, Ban Pan, Village No. 4, Ban Mae Ton, Village No. 5, Ban Pong Thong, Village No. 6, Ban Dong, Village No. 7, Ban Pang HI Later in 1996, Ban Kamphaeng Hin was separated from Ban Mae Ton. It is a new village, being the 8th village of Tambon Thep Sadet onwards.

After the Sub-District Council and Sub-District Administrative Organization Act B.E. 2537 was promulgated in the Government Gazette. Therefore, Thep Sadet Subdistrict Being a legal entity Since February 23, 1997
