= Sa-nga Ban =

Sa-nga Ban สง่าบ้าน
- Subdistrict
- Country: Thailand
- Province: Chiang Mai
- District: Doi Saket

Population (2005)
  - Total: 2,225
- Time zone: UTC+7 (ICT)

Sa-nga Ban (Thai: สง่าบ้าน, pronounced [sā.ŋàː bâːn]) is a tambon (subdistrict) of Doi Saket District, in Chiang Mai Province, Thailand. In 2005 it had a population of 2,225 people. The tambon contains five villages.
