= Mae Pong =

Mae Pong แม่โป่ง
- Tambon
- Country: Thailand
- Province: Chiang Mai
- District: Doi Saket

Population (2005)
  - Total: 5,589
- Time zone: UTC+7 (ICT)

Mae Pong (Thai: แม่โป่ง) is a tambon (subdistrict) of Doi Saket District, in Chiang Mai Province, Thailand. In 2005 it had a population of 5,589 people. The tambon contains 10 villages.
