= Choeng Doi =

Coordinates: 18°52′N 99°08′E

Choeng Doi เชิงดอย
- Tambon
- Interactive map of Choeng Doi
- Country: Thailand
- Province: Chiang Mai
- District: Doi Saket

Population (2005)
  - Total: 10,750
- Time zone: UTC+7 (ICT)

Choeng Doi (Thai: เชิงดอย) is a tambon (subdistrict) of Doi Saket District, in Chiang Mai Province, Thailand. In 2005, it had a population of 10,750 people. The tambon contains 13 villages.
