= Pa Lan =

Pa Lan ป่าลาน
- Tambon
- Country: Thailand
- Province: Chiang Mai
- District: Doi Saket

Population (2005)
  - Total: 1,993
- Time zone: UTC+7 (ICT)

Pa Lan (Thai: ป่าลาน) is a tambon (subdistrict) of Doi Saket District, in Chiang Mai Province, Thailand. In 2005 it had a population of 1,993 people. The tambon contains six villages.
