= Mae Hoi Ngoen =

Mae Hoi Ngoen แม่ฮ้อยเงิน
- Tambon
- Country: Thailand
- Province: Chiang Mai
- District: Doi Saket

Population (2005)
  - Total: 3,848
- Time zone: UTC+7 (ICT)

Mae Hoi Ngoen (Thai: แม่ฮ้อยเงิน) is a tambon (subdistrict) of Doi Saket District, in Chiang Mai Province, Thailand. In 2005 it had a population of 3,848 people. The tambon contains six villages.
