= Samran Rat, Chiang Mai =

Samran Rat สำราญราษฎร์
- Tambon
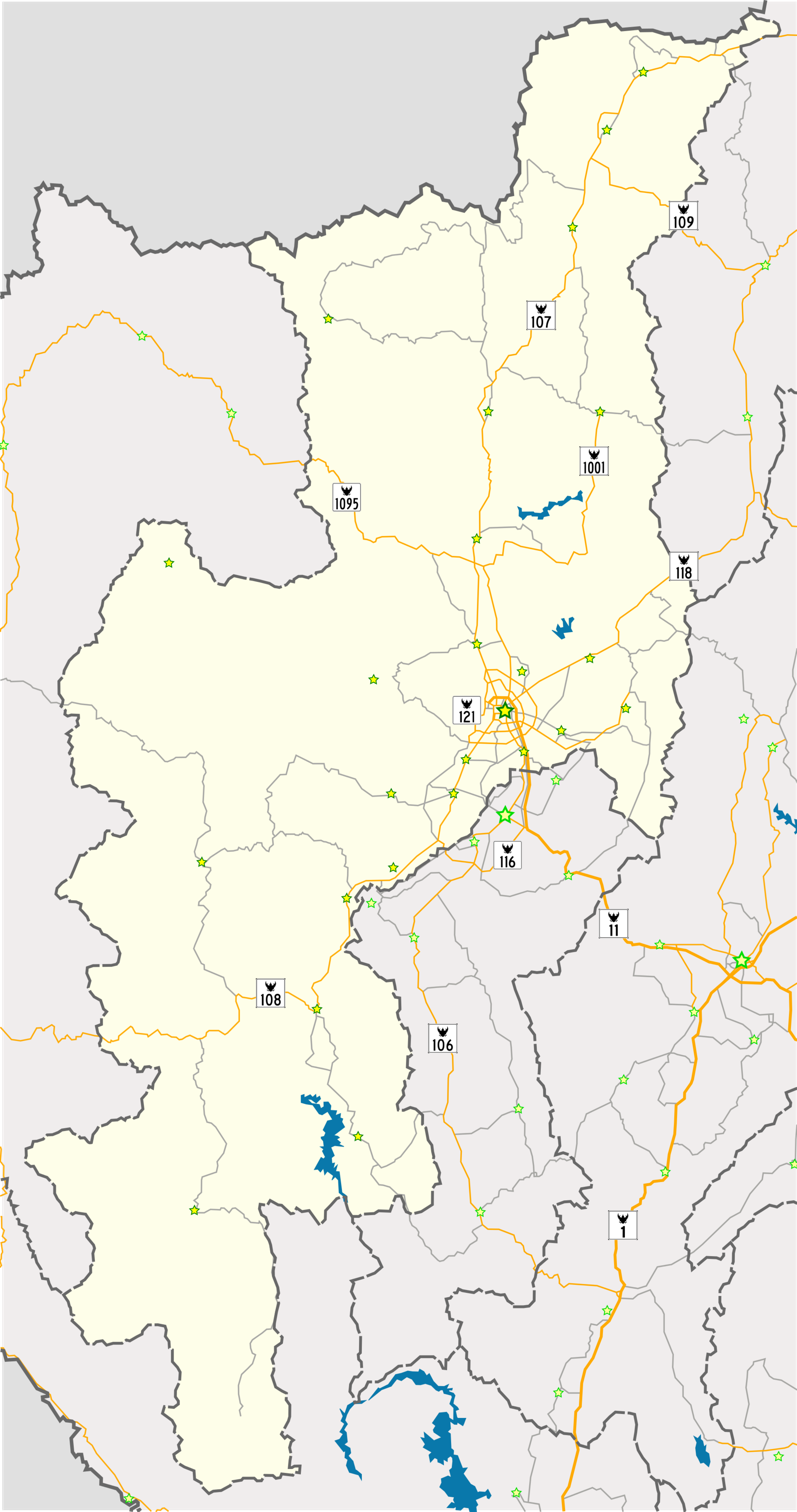
- Location within Chiang Mai Province
- Country: Thailand
- Province: Chiang Mai
- District: Doi Saket

Population (2005)
  - Total: 3,336
- Time zone: UTC+7 (ICT)

Samran Rat (Thai: สำราญราษฎร์) is a tambon (subdistrict) of Doi Saket District, in Chiang Mai Province, Thailand. In 2005 it had a population of 3,336 people. The tambon contains eight villages.
