= Pa Miang =

Pa Miang ป่าเมี่ยง
- Tambon
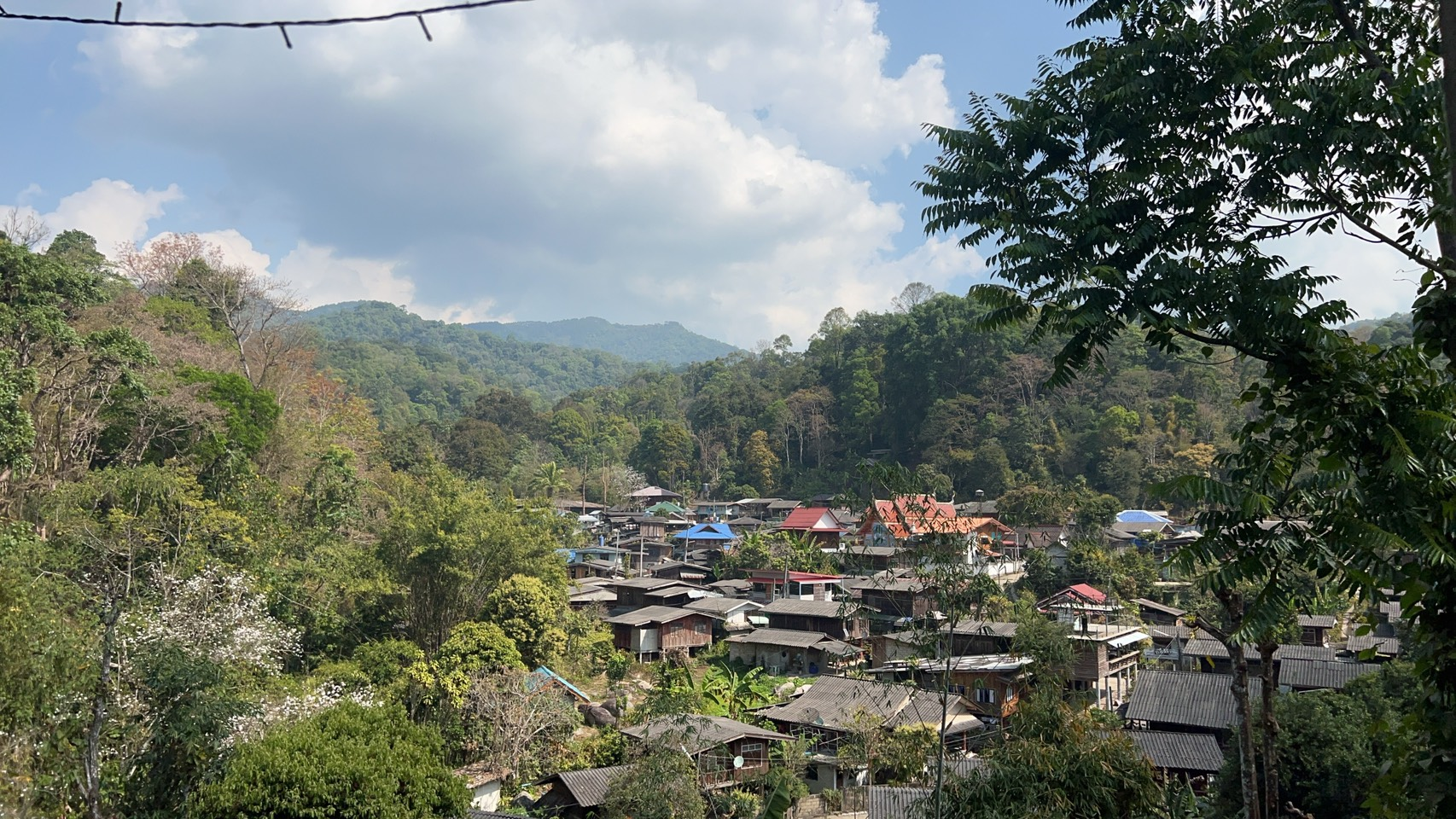

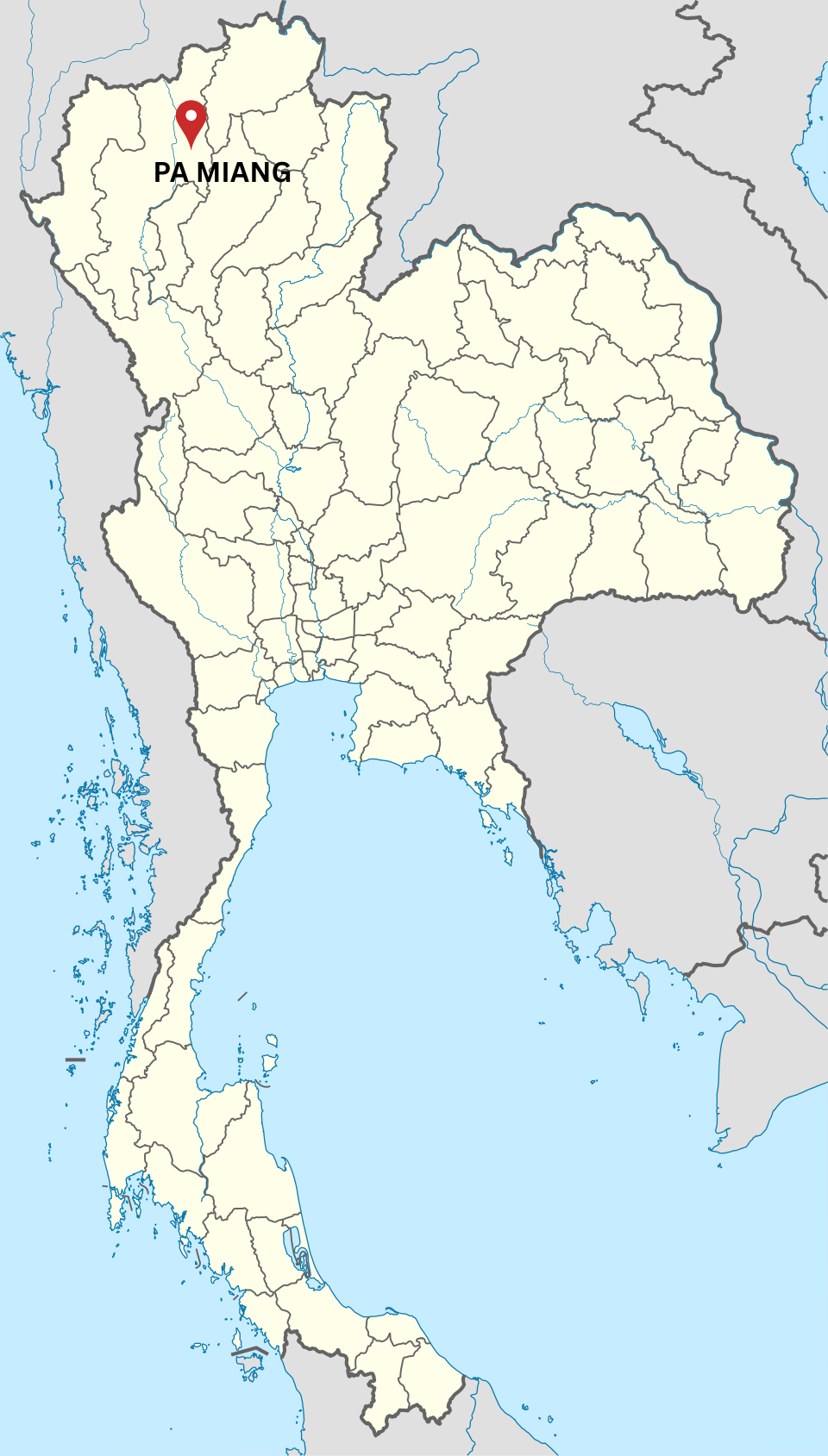
- Coordinates: 18°49′45.5″N 99°23′15.3″E
- Country: Thailand
- Province: Lampang
- District: Mueang Pan

Population (2023)
  - Total: 416
- Time zone: UTC+7 (ICT)

Pa Miang (Thai: ป่าเมี่ยง) is a rural village in Mueang Pan District, Lampang Province, in northern Thailand. It is located in a mountainous forest area east of Chiang Mai city and is known for its long tradition of cultivating and processing miang, a type of fermented tea leaf. In 2023, the village had a population of 416 residents, including 221 males and 195 females, living in 216 households. The local economy is largely based on small-scale agriculture, tea production, and community-based tourism [5]. Pa Miang is recognized for combining traditional livelihoods with forest conservation, as residents manage tea gardens within natural forest ecosystems. The village also attracts eco-tourists who come for its landscape, local culture, and tea-related activities.

== Etymology ==
The name Pa Miang comes from the Thai words pa (Thai: ป่า), meaning “forest,” and miang, which refers to fermented tea leaves. Together, the name reflects the village’s long-standing connection to forest-based tea cultivation.

== History ==
Pa Miang village, located in Chaeson Subdistrict, Mueang Pan District, Lampang Province, is believed to have been established more than 200 years ago. According to local oral history, the first settlers migrated from Nan Province, followed by groups from different ethnic and regional backgrounds, including Lanna, Khmu, and Tai Yai communities. Early migration to the area has been linked to efforts to avoid military conscription and taxation.

In its early years, the community relied mainly on upland rice farming. Over time, villagers discovered that wild tea plants grew abundantly in the surrounding forest. As a result, they gradually shifted to producing miang (fermented tea leaves), which provided a more stable source of income. This change encouraged permanent settlement and contributed to the village’s name.

During the late 20th century, several external factors shaped the village’s development. In 1977, a road was built to improve access and security, leading many residents to relocate closer to the roadside. In 1988, the area became part of Chae Son National Park. This introduced conservation regulations that limited land use and restricted traditional practices such as forest clearing and resource gathering. As a result, upland rice farming declined, and the community had to adapt its livelihood strategies. In later years, eco-tourism in the region created new opportunities. Pa Miang became part of tourism initiatives linked to the national park, with villagers offering homestays and local experiences. This development has helped establish the village as a destination for visitors interested in nature and traditional ways of life.

== Geography ==
Pa Miang is located in Village No. 7, Chaeson Subdistrict, Mueang Pan District, Lampang Province, within Chae Son National Park. The village covers approximately 1,369 rai and lies about 25 kilometers from the Chaeson Subdistrict Administrative Organization and 34 kilometers from the Mueang Pan district office. It borders Ban Mae Chaem to the north, Ban Don Chai to the south, Ban Si Don Mun to the east, and Ban Huai Kaeo in Chiang Mai Province to the west. The village is set in a mountainous landscape with complex highland terrain and evergreen forest. It lies along the watershed ridge of the Phi Pan Nam mountain range, which forms a natural boundary between Lampang and Chiang Mai provinces. The highest nearby peak, Doi Lan, reaches about 1,830 meters above sea level, while the village itself sits at an average elevation of around 1,010 meters.

The area is an important watershed, with streams flowing into the Mae Pan river system, which eventually connects to the Wang River. The climate is influenced by the village’s elevation and forest environment. There are three main seasons: the rainy season (May to October), the cool season (November to March), and a short hot season (March to April). Despite seasonal changes, temperatures remain relatively mild, averaging around 26°C.

== Ecology ==
The economy of Pa Miang centers on the cultivation and production of miang, a type of fermented tea made from Assam tea leaves. The village’s highland location within Chae Son National Park provides a cool climate suitable for tea cultivation. Miang is grown under the shade of large forest trees, as Assam tea plants require filtered sunlight, sufficient moisture, and elevations of around 1,200–1,500 meters. This method supports forest conservation because villagers maintain existing trees and preserve the natural ecosystem. Small-scale farming, community-based tourism, and miang production are the main economic activities. The production of miang has been practiced for nearly 200 years and remains the primary source of income. Tea leaves are harvested and fermented using traditional methods to create a sour-tasting product widely consumed in northern Thailand. Pa Miang is known as a major source of high-quality miang, which is sold to traders and distributed to markets in Lampang and Chiang Rai. In addition, the community produces related goods such as tea leaf pillows made from dried miang leaves. Other income sources include homestays and the sale of local food and beverages.

== Culture and lifestyle ==
Before 1988, the livelihoods of Pa Miang residents were closely tied to miang production and forest resources. Villagers spent much of the year harvesting and processing tea leaves. During the off-season, they gathered forest products, collected firewood, hunted for food, and practiced seasonal honey collection. After the area became part of Chae Son National Park in 1988, access to forest resources was restricted. Activities such as hunting and foraging were no longer allowed, leading to changes in traditional practices. As a result, villagers shifted their focus mainly to miang cultivation within managed areas, a pattern that continues today.

== Religious practice ==
Most residents of Pa Miang are Buddhist and regularly take part in religious activities at the local temple, especially on important holy days. A common belief is that miang should not be harvested on these days, as doing so may harm the tea plants or bring misfortune.

== Tourism ==
Pa Miang has become an increasingly popular eco-tourism destination due to its natural environment and traditional way of life. Key attractions include waterfalls, homestays, tea-related activities, and immersive cultural experiences.

== Festivals and traditions ==
Pa Miang follows a traditional annual calendar that combines religious observances, agricultural cycles, and community events, many of which are based on the lunar calendar and Lanna traditions.

In January, villagers hold merit-making ceremonies, celebrate the new rice harvest, and organize Children’s Day activities. In February, the Dok Siew Blooming Festival takes place, when white Bauhinia flowers cover the surrounding mountains. March includes activities such as honey collection and bamboo weaving. April marks Songkran (Thai New Year), with water-pouring rituals, temple ceremonies, and ancestral traditions. From May onward, the miang harvesting season begins and continues through the rainy and cool seasons. June includes Bun Bang Fai (rocket festival), while July marks the start of Buddhist Lent. In August, Mother’s Day is celebrated with community events. In September, the Tan Miang ceremony is held, where fermented tea is offered at the temple or sold to support religious activities. October marks the end of Buddhist Lent, followed by Yi Peng and Loy Krathong in November. In December, Father’s Day and village development activities take place.

== Environment and conservation ==
To support biodiversity and sustainable land use, the community integrates tea cultivation into natural forest systems. This approach helps preserve the ecosystem while maintaining local livelihoods.

== Access ==
Pa Miang can be reached by road from Chiang Mai city, mainly via Doi Saket District and Route 1317. Another route passes through Mae On District, Huai Kaeo Subdistrict, and Ban Mae Kampong; although shorter, this route is steeper and narrower. From Lampang, the village is about 60 kilometers away. Visitors usually travel through Chae Son National Park and continue for around 16 kilometers to reach Pa Miang. The route includes approximately 6 kilometers of asphalt road and 10 kilometers of concrete road through mountainous terrain, taking about 30 minutes.

== Gallery ==
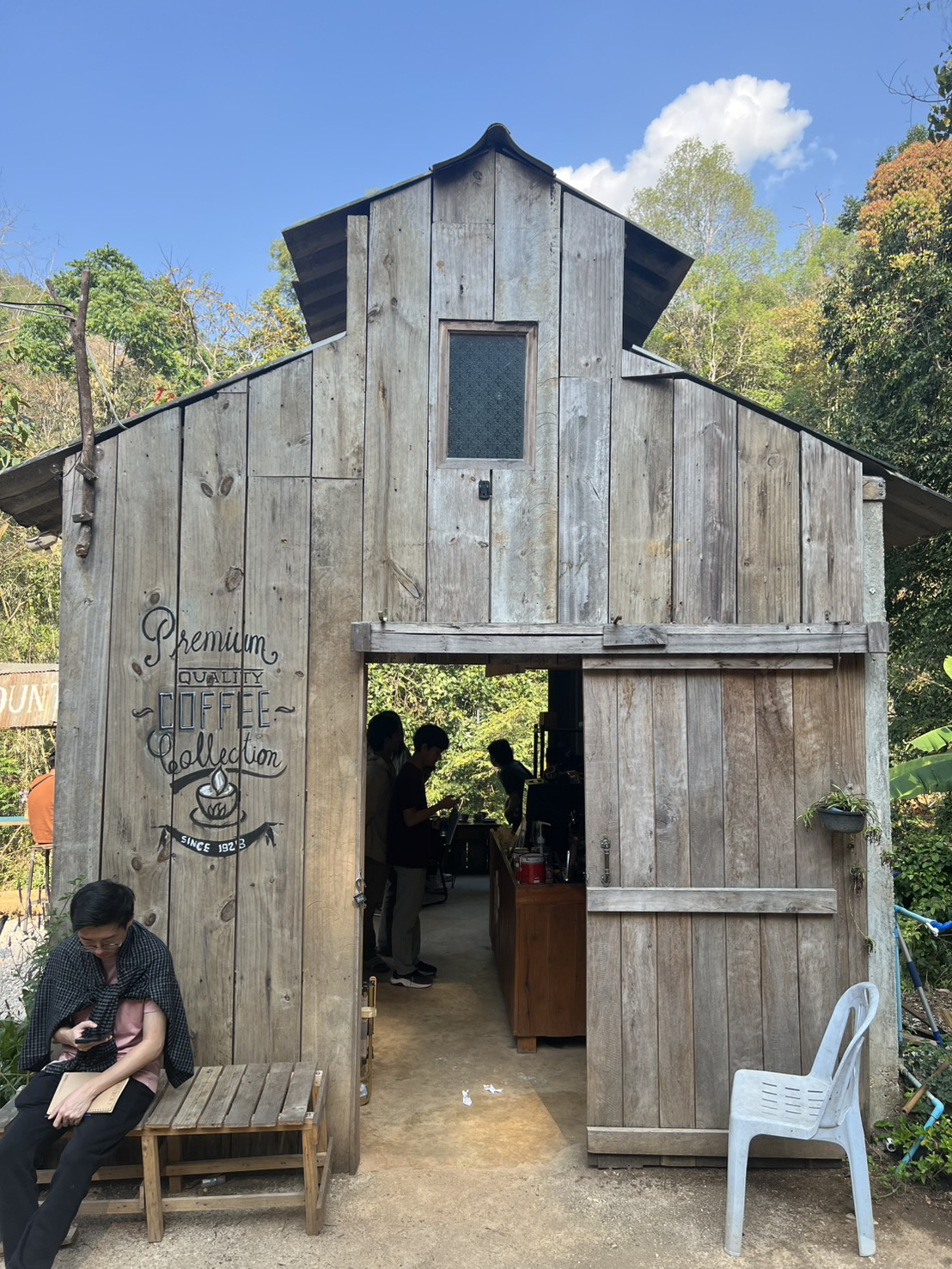
TWF Coffee Cafe

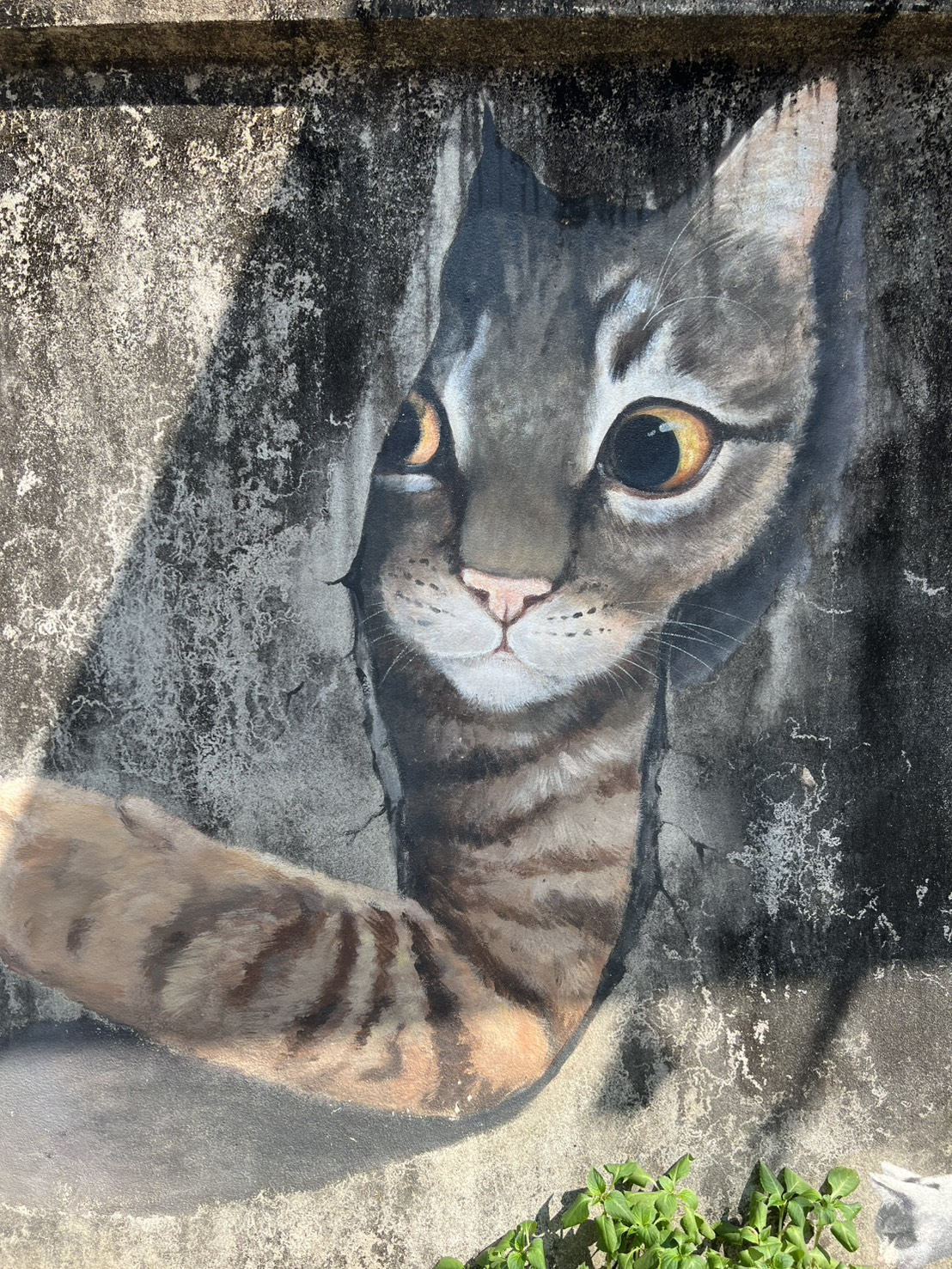
"Awakening Art Space" StreetArt

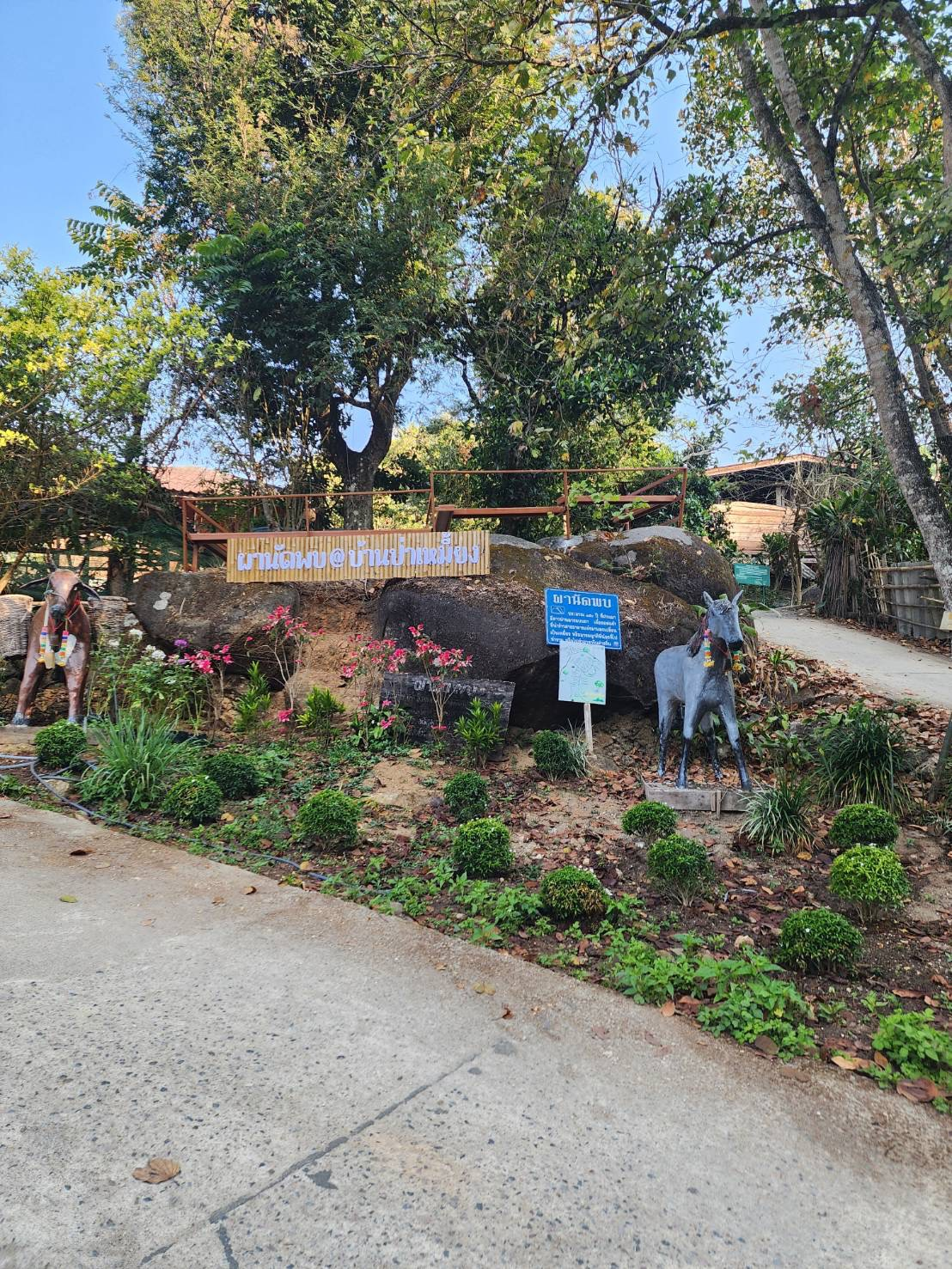
Pa Nud Pob (ผานัดพบ)

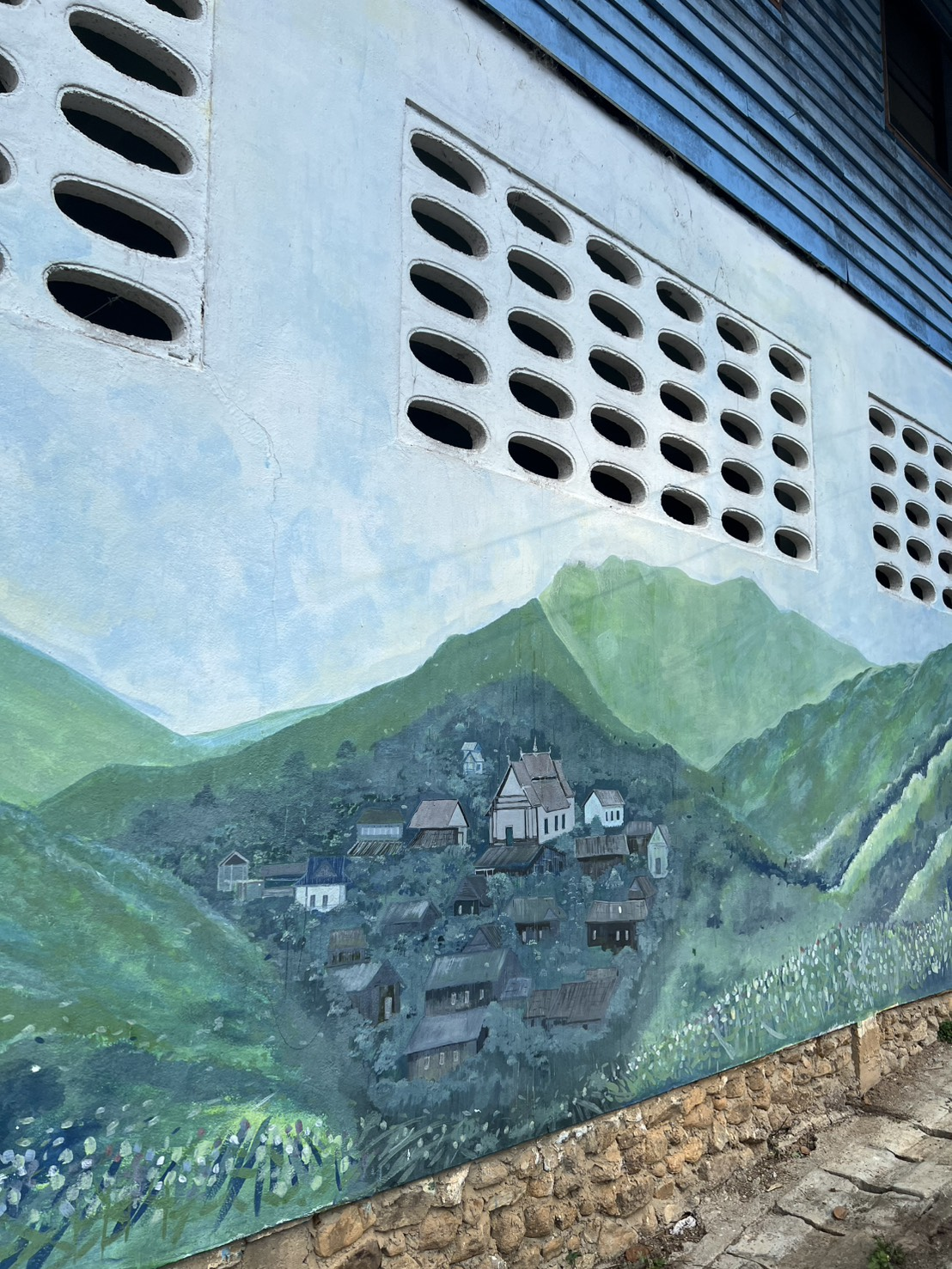
"Awakening Art Space" StreetArt
