= Talat Gasimov =

Talat Gasimov Tələt Qasımov
- Born: June 21, 1933; Baku, Azerbaijan SSR, TSFSR, USSR
- Died: July 28, 2013 (aged 80); Baku, Azerbaijan
- Genres: mugham
- Occupation: khananda
- Awards: Honored Artist of the Republic of Azerbaijan

Talat Mammadagha oghlu Gasimov (Azerbaijani: Tələt Məmmədağa oğlu Qasımov, June 21, 1933 — July 28, 2013) was an Azerbaijani khananda, People's Artiste of Azerbaijan.

== Biography ==
Talat Gasimov was born on June 21, 1933, in Baku. At first, he was very interested in religious music and started reciting elegy. Later he became a khananda. He took mugham lessons from Zulfu Adigozalov and Hajibaba Huseynov. "Rast", "Shur", "Segah-Zabul" mugam-dasgahs, "Shushtar" classification performed by him are kept in the fund of Azerbaijan State Television and Radio.

T. Gasimov was a soloist of the Azerbaijan State Philharmonic Hall. For many years he was a soloist of the "Azerconcert" Union, represented the Azerbaijani musical culture in various countries around the world — Turkey, Iran, Germany, Russia, Egypt, Algeria, Tunisia, Morocco.

Talat Gasimov died on July 28, 2013, in Baku.

== Awards ==
- People's Artiste of Azerbaijan — May 16, 2006
- Honored Artist of the Republic of Azerbaijan — May 24, 1998
