= Talat Hussain =

Talat Hussain may refer to:

- Talat Hussain (actor) (1940–2024), Pakistani actor and screenwriter
- Syed Talat Hussain (born 1966), Pakistani journalist

== See also ==
- Hussain
