= Talat Yai =

Coordinates: 8°50′N 98°22′E

Talat Yai ตลาดใหญ่
- Tambon
- Interactive map of Talat Yai
- Country: Thailand
- Province: Phang Nga
- District: Takua Pa

Population (2005)
  - Total: 3,760
- Time zone: UTC+7 (ICT)

Talat Yai (Thai: ตลาดใหญ่, pronounced [tā.làːt jàj]) is a tambon (subdistrict) of Takua Pa District, in Phang Nga Province, Thailand. In 2005 it had a population of 3,760 people. The tambon contains five villages.
