= Talat Khwan, Chiang Mai =

Coordinates: 13°52′N 100°31′E

Talat Khwan ตลาดขวัญ
- Tambon
- Interactive map of Talat Khwan
- Country: Thailand
- Province: Chiang Mai
- District: Doi Saket

Population (2005)
  - Total: 3,418
- Time zone: UTC+7 (ICT)

Talat Khwan (Thai: ตลาดขวัญ, pronounced [tā.làːt kʰwǎn]) is a tambon (subdistrict) of Doi Saket district, in Chiang Mai province, Thailand. In 2005 it had a population of 3,418 people. The tambon contains six villages.
