= Mae Ai =

Mae Ai may refer to:

- Mae Ai District
- Mae Ai Subdistrict
- Mae Ai Municipality
