= Malika, Thailand =

Malika มะลิกา
- Tambon
- Interactive map of Malika
- Coordinates: 20°02′10″N 99°18′04″E
- Country: Thailand
- Province: Chiang Mai
- Amphoe: Mae Ai

Population (2020)
  - Total: 4,364
- Time zone: UTC+7 (TST)
- Postal code: 50280
- TIS 1099: 501007

Malika (Thai: มะลิกา) is a tambon (subdistrict) of Mae Ai District, in Chiang Mai Province, Thailand. In 2020 it had a total population of 4,364 people.

== History ==
The subdistrict was created effective August 21, 1995 by splitting off 8 administrative villages from Mae Ai.

== Administration ==
=== Central administration ===
The tambon is subdivided into 10 administrative villages (muban).

No.	Name	Thai
1.	Ban Pang Ton Khong	บ้านปางต้นฆ้อง
2.	Ban Pa Bong	บ้านป่าบง
3.	Ban San Ton Muang	บ้านสันต้นม่วง
4.	Ban San Pa Hiao	บ้านสันป่าเหียว
5.	Ban San Phak La	บ้านสันผักหละ
6.	Ban San Khong	บ้านสันโค้ง
7.	Ban Chai Sathan	บ้านชัยสถาน
8.	Ban Ek	บ้านเอก
9.	Ban Pa Bong Tai	บ้านป่าบงใต้
10.	Ban Mongkhon Nimit	บ้านมงคลนิมิต

=== Local administration ===
The area of the subdistrict is shared by 2 local governments.

- the subdistrict municipality (Thesaban Tambon) Mae Ai (เทศบาลตำบลแม่อาย)
- the subdistrict administrative organization (SAO) Doi Lang (องค์การบริหารส่วนตำบลดอยลาง)
