= Ban Luang =

Ban Luang may refer to several places in Thailand:

- Ban Luang, Chom Thong
- Ban Luang, Mae Ai
- Ban Luang, Don Phut - Saraburi Province, Thailand
- Ban Luang, Don Tum - Nakhon Pathom Province, Thailand
- Ban Luang district - District of Nan Province, Thailand
