= Lao River (Thailand) =

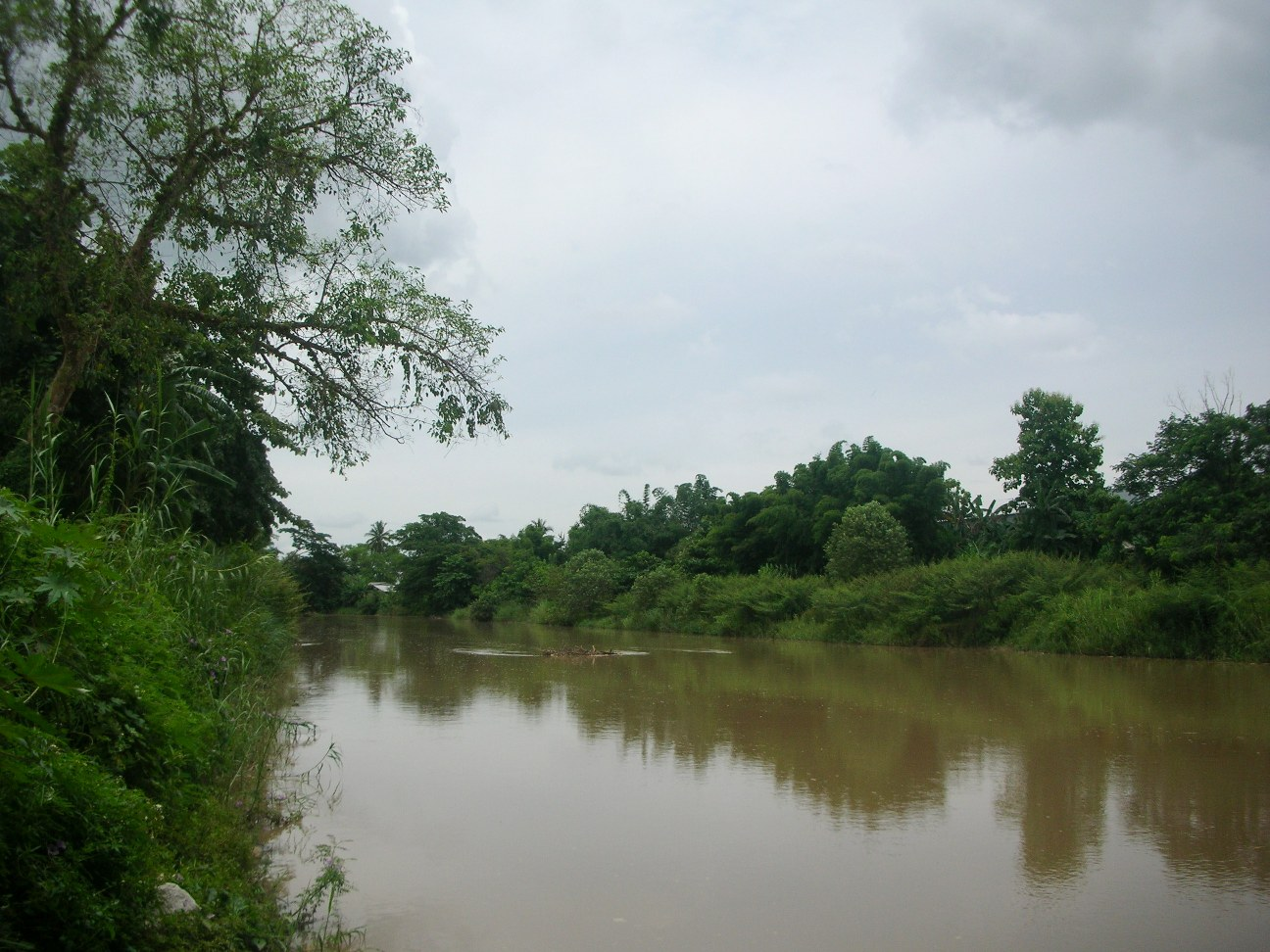
- The Lao River at Ban Tha Sai, Chiang Rai Province

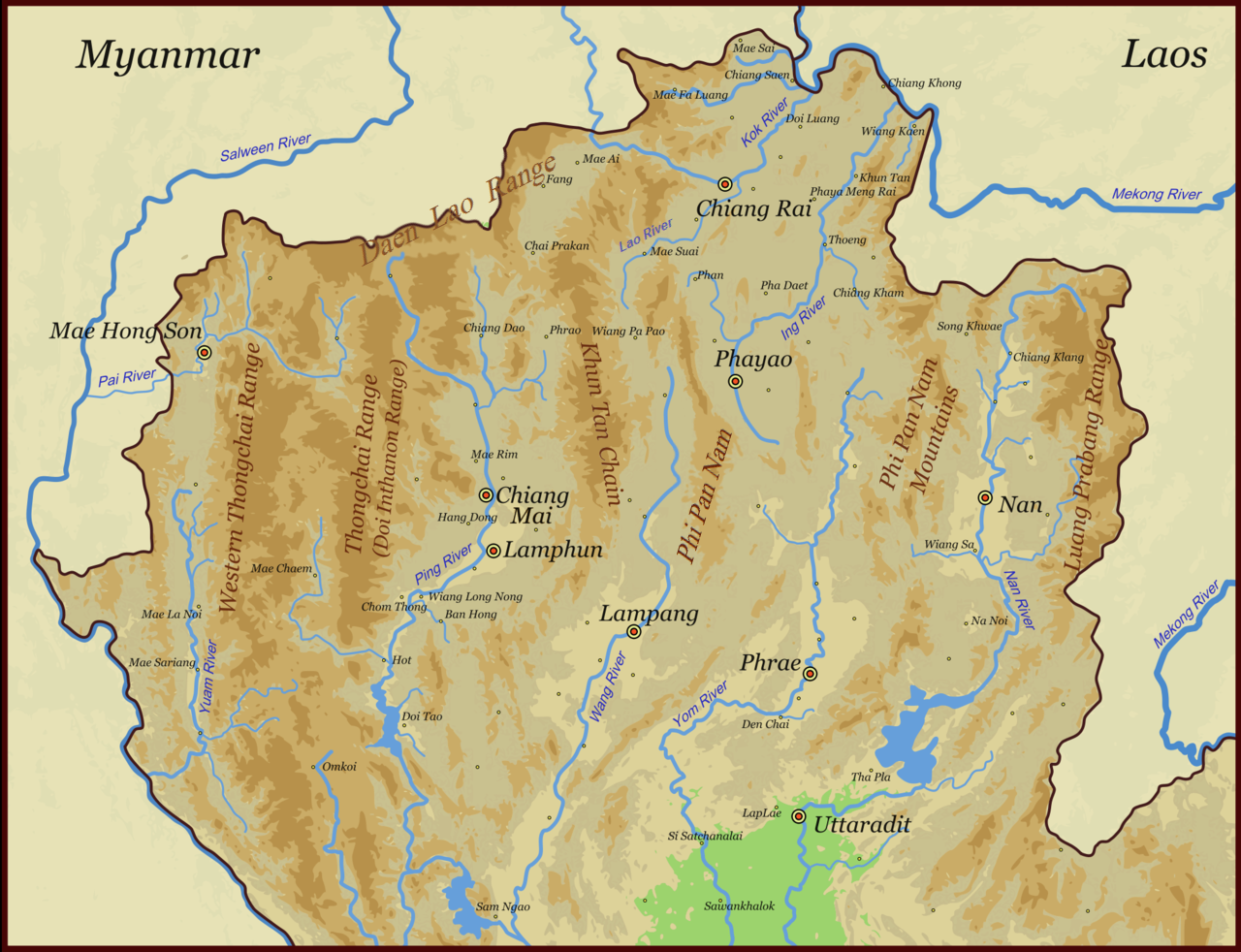
- Map of the Thai highlands
- Native name: น้ำแม่ลาว (Thai)

Location
- Country: Thailand
- State: Chiang Rai Province
- District: Wiang Pa Pao, Mae Suai, Mae Lao, Mueang Chiang Rai
- City: Chiang Rai city

Physical characteristics
- Source
  - location: Phi Pan Nam Range, Chiang Rai Province, Thailand
- Mouth: Kok River
  - location: Sum Pratu, Chiang Rai Province
  - coordinates: 19°55′35″N 99°53′57″E
  - elevation: 386 m (1,266 ft)
- Length: 206 km (128 mi)
- Basin size: 3,224 km^{2} (1,245 sq mi)
- Discharge
  - location: Mae Lao District
  - average: 28 m^{3}/s (990 cu ft/s)
  - minimum: 0.3 m^{3}/s (11 cu ft/s)
  - maximum: 451 m^{3}/s (15,900 cu ft/s)
- Discharge
  - location: Mae Suai District
  - average: 34 m^{3}/s (1,200 cu ft/s)

Basin features
- Tributaries
  - left: Suai River

The Lao River or Mae Lao River (Thai: น้ำแม่ลาว, RTGS: Nam Mae Lao, pronounced [náːm mɛ̂ː lāːw]) is a river in Chiang Rai Province, Northern Thailand. It is a tributary of the Kok River, with its mouth near Sum Pratu in Mueang Chiang Rai District. This river gives its name to the Mae Lao District.

The Lao River originates in the Phi Pan Nam Range and flows initially northwards across Wiang Pa Pao District and then northeastwards through the districts of Mae Suai, Mae Lao and Mueang Chiang Rai passing just south of Chiang Rai city.

The Suai River, which gives its name to the Mae Suai District, is one of the main tributaries of the Lao River.
