= Ban Luang, Mae Ai =

Ban Luang บ้านหลวง
- Tambon
- Ban Luang SAO Multipurpose Ground
- Country: Thailand
- Province: Chiang Mai
- Amphoe: Mae Ai

Population (2020)
  - Total: 7,680
- Time zone: UTC+7 (TST)
- Postal code: 50280
- TIS 1099: 501006

Ban Luang (Thai: บ้านหลวง) is a tambon (subdistrict) of Mae Ai District, in Chiang Mai Province, Thailand. In 2020 it had a total population of 7,680 people.

== History ==
The subdistrict was created effective July 1, 1980 by splitting off 5 administrative villages from San Ton Mue.

== Administration ==
=== Central administration ===
The tambon is subdivided into 10 administrative villages (muban).

No.	Name	Thai
1.	Ban Luang	บ้านหลวง
2.	Ban Pa Daet	บ้านป่าแดด
3.	Ban San Hang	บ้านสันห้าง
4.	Ban Pa Ko	บ้านป่าก๊อ
5.	Ban Pa Daeng	บ้านป่าแดง
6.	Ban Mai Pho Ngam	บ้านใหม่โพธิ์งาม
7.	Ban Chatsan	บ้านจัดสรร
8.	Ban Mai Sai Kham	บ้านใหม่ทรายคำ
9.	Ban Pa Daeng Phiwat	บ้านป่าแดงอภิวัฒน์
10.	Ban Pong Phatthana	บ้านโปงพัฒนา

=== Local administration ===
The whole area of the subdistrict is covered by the subdistrict administrative organization (SAO) Ban Luang (องค์การบริหารส่วนตำบลบ้านหลวง).
