= Kok River =

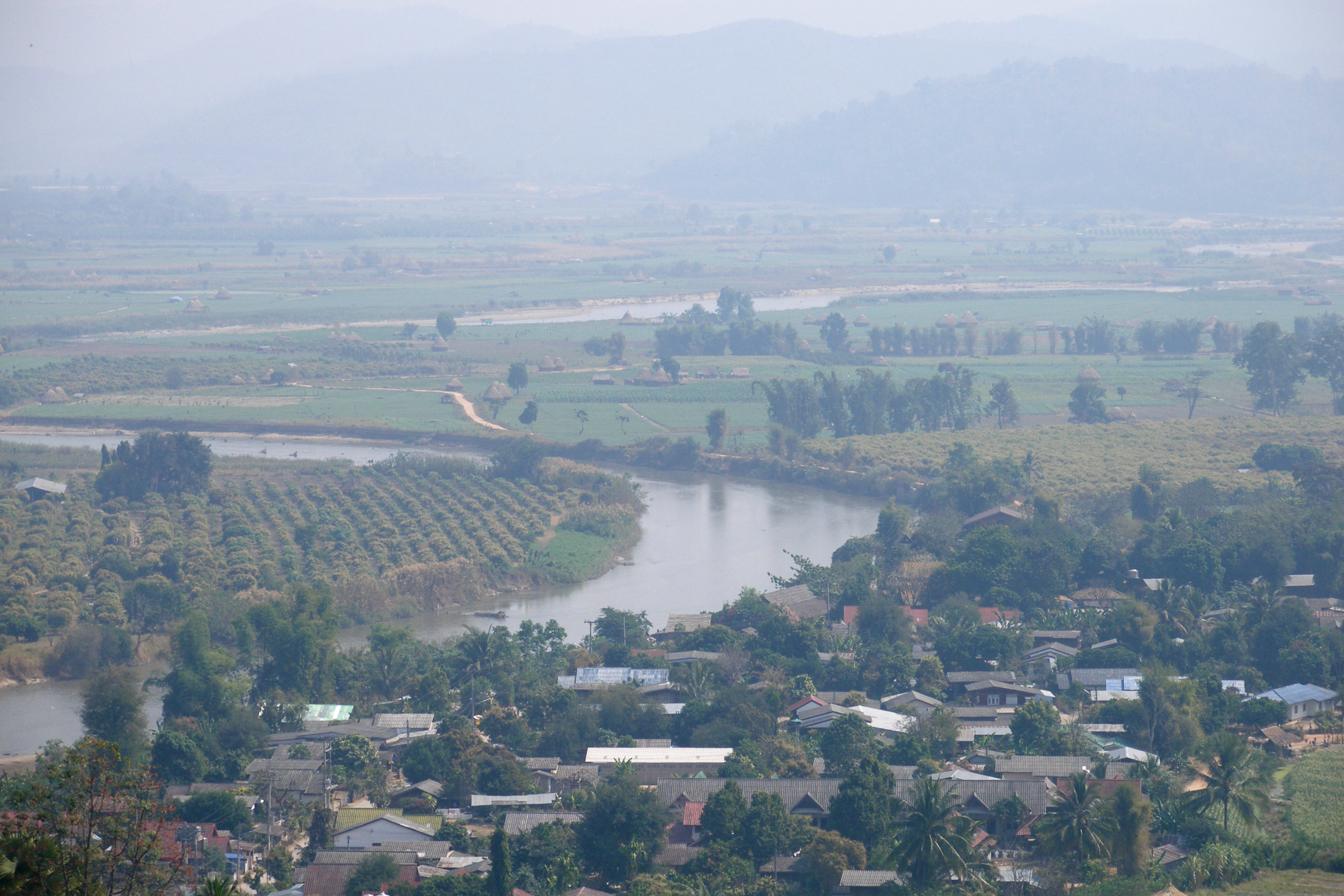
- Kok River at Tha Ton

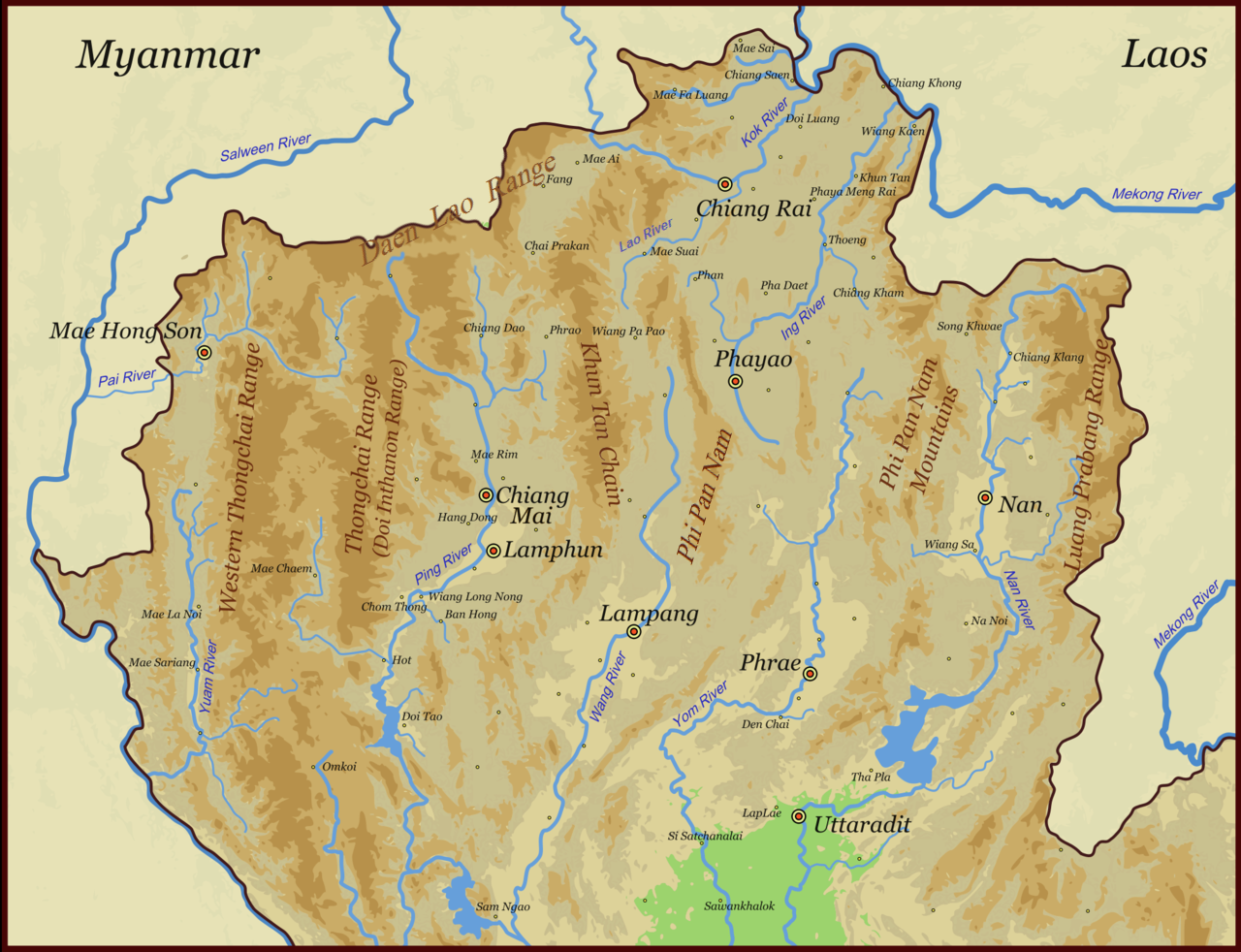
- Map of the Thai highlands
- Native name: แม่น้ำกก (Thai)

Location
- Country: Burma, Thailand
- State: Shan State, Chiang Mai Province, Chiang Rai Province
- District: Mae Ai, Mueang Chiang Rai, Mae Chan, Wiang Chai, Chiang Saen
- City: Chiang Rai city

Physical characteristics
- Source
  - location: Daen Lao Range, Shan State, Burma
- Mouth: Mekong River
  - location: Sop Kok, Wiang Chai, Chiang Rai Province
  - coordinates: 20°14′39″N 100°8′19″E
  - elevation: 358 m (1,175 ft)
- Length: 285 km (177 mi)
- Basin size: 10,875 km^{2} (4,199 sq mi)
- Discharge
  - location: Chiang Rai city
  - average: 120 m^{3}/s (4,200 cu ft/s)
  - minimum: 5 m^{3}/s (180 cu ft/s)
  - maximum: 1,599 m^{3}/s (56,500 cu ft/s)
- Discharge
  - location: Sob Kok
  - average: 170 m^{3}/s (6,000 cu ft/s)

Basin features
- Tributaries
  - right: Fang, Lao River

The Kok River (Thai: แม่น้ำกก, RTGS: Maenam Kok, pronounced [mɛ̂ː.náːm kòk]; Northern Thai: ᨶᩣᩴ᩶ᩯᨾ᩵ᨠᩫ᩠ᨠ, pronounced [náːm mɛ̂ː kǒk]) is a tributary river of the Mekong that flows through Chiang Rai and Chiang Mai provinces in northern Thailand.

== Source ==
The river originates in the Daen Lao Range, Shan State, Myanmar. The first 170 km of the Kok are in Myanmar, upstream from Tha Ton. It flows eastwards across the Myanmar–Thailand border, crossing at the Thai border town of Tha Ton (Thai: ท่าตอน, also spelled "Thaton" ). It flows to Mae Ai District, Chiang Mai Province. Most of its length in Thailand is in Chiang Rai Province where it passes Mueang Chiang Rai District after which it bends northeastwards and flows through Mae Chan, Wiang Chai and Chiang Saen districts.

It is a wide, shallow, and slow-moving river. There is about 600 metres (2,000 ft) of small-scale whitewater halfway between the towns of Tha Ton and Chiang Rai.

For several kilometres downriver from Chiang Rai, the river becomes a lake, until it reaches the irrigation dam near Wiang Chai.

The Kok River is a tributary of the Mekong River, with its mouth at Sop Kok in Chiang Saen District, opposite the Lao border.

Phahonyothin Road crosses this river near Chiang Rai city. Altogether, five bridges cross the Kok River near Chiang Rai city.

== Tributaries ==
The main tributaries of the Kok River are the Fang and the Lao River, the latter having its source in the Phi Pan Nam Range.

== Dams ==
There is a small dam with 11 gates which provides irrigation for rice fields east of Chiang Rai. The dam is 11 kilometres (7 mi) east of the Hwy 1 bridge. It turns the river into a lake, several miles long, for eight months of the year. Additionally, there is a dam planned on the Burmese side of where the river flows into Thailand, about 32 kilometres (20 mi) upstream from the border.

== Top Gear ==
In October 2013 the cast and crew of the British television show Top Gear constructed a bridge over the Kok as part of their Burma Special. The bridge was originally planned to be built over the River Kwai, but the River Fang which flows into the Kok was chosen "accidentally". The show aired in two parts on 9 March 2014 and 16 March 2014.

Following production of the episode, the bridge was taken down, despite the producers and crew wanting it to stay in use for the locals.

== Contamination since 2025 ==
In March 2025, it was reported that the section of the Kok river in Chiang Mai had turned unusually cloudy and people were developing rashes after swimming. Testing of water samples by Thai authorities found the turbidity to be ten times above standard and also detected unsafe levels of lead and arsenic. Mining for gold or rare-earth elements upstream in Myanmar has been suspected to be the cause. As of March 2026, tests continued to show contamination in some locations.
