= Tha Ton =

Sub-district in Chiang Mai Province, Thailand

Coordinates: 20°3′39″N 99°21′44″E

Tha Ton ท่าตอน
- Tambon
- Interactive map of Tha Ton
- Country: Thailand
- Province: Chiang Mai
- District: Mae Ai

Population (2014)
  - Total: 19,902
- Time zone: UTC+7 (ICT)
- Postal code: 50280
- TIS 1099: 501005

Tha Ton, also spelled Thaton (Thai: ท่าตอน), is a sub-district (tambon) of Mae Ai District in the far north of Chiang Mai Province, Thailand. In 2014 it had a population of 19,902. The sub-district is on the Kok River near the border with Myanmar, about a three hour drive north of Chiang Mai. The central village of the subdistrict is Ban Tha Ton.

== History ==
View from Wat Tha Ton over the village of Tha Ton and the Kok River

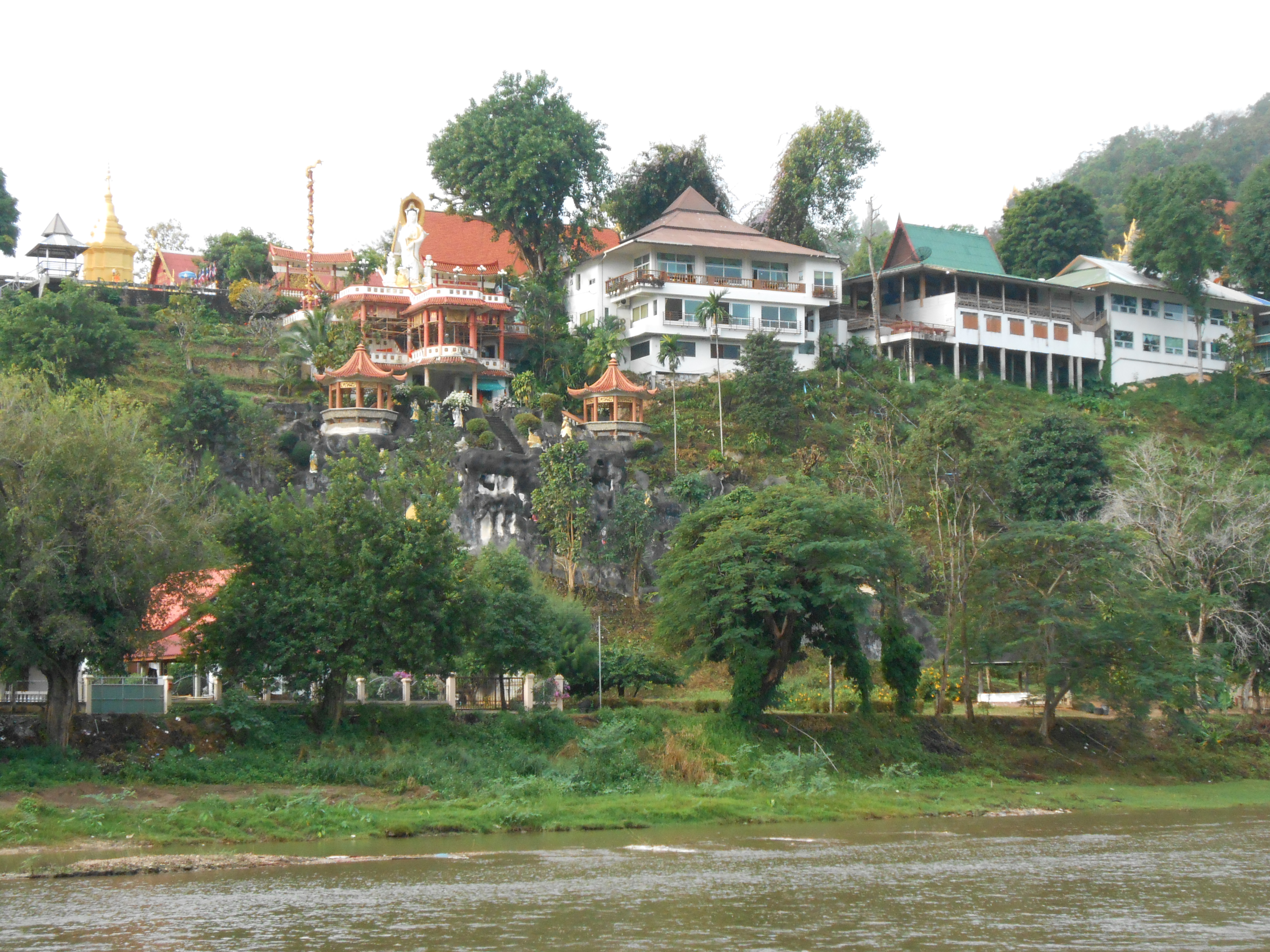
Tha Ton

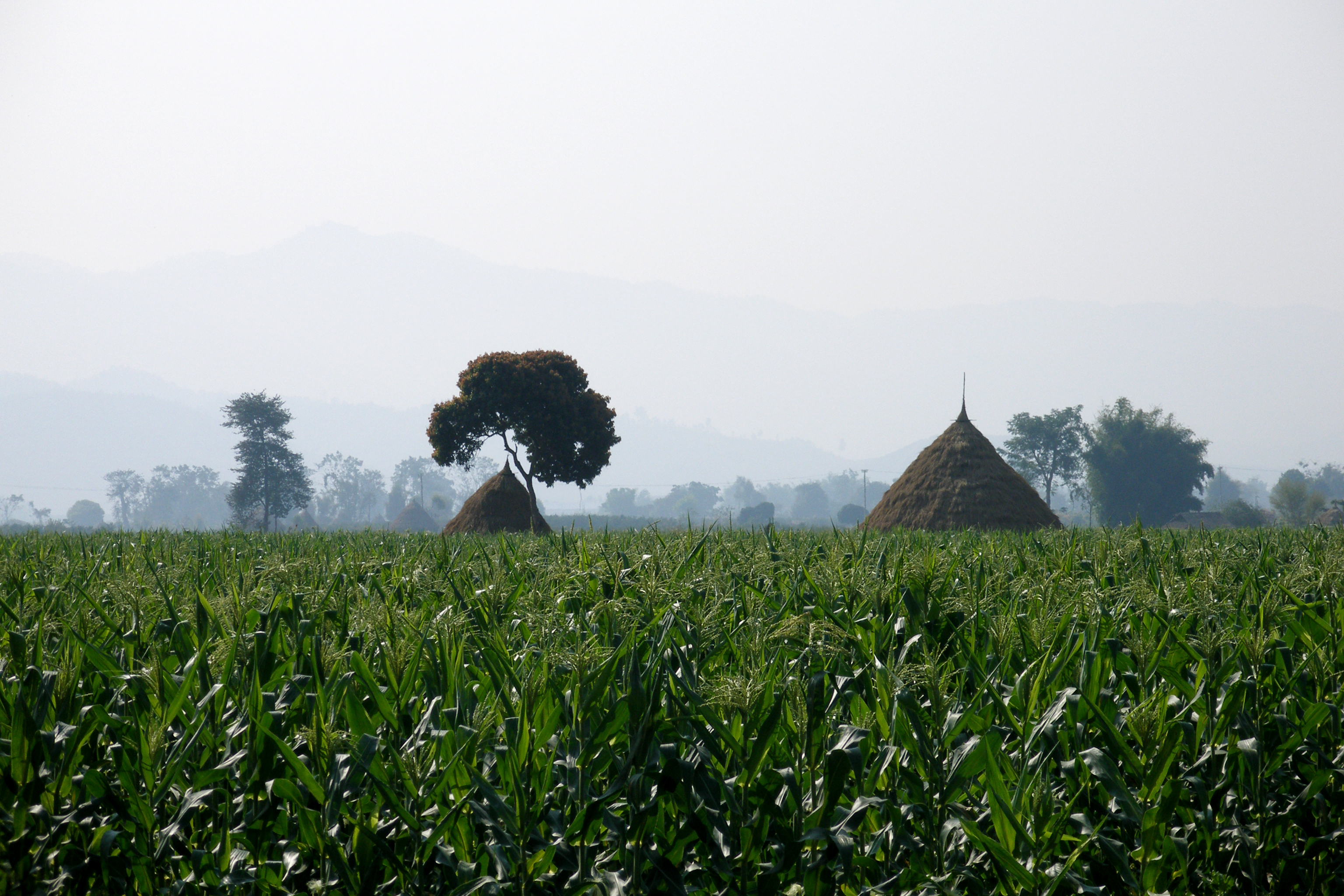
Tha Ton countryside

The river forms part of the border and consequently the village has changed hands numerous times in the turbulent history of the area with the latest change happening in the early-20th century when the border was moved 3.2 km upstream leaving the north bank, previously part of Burma (Myanmar), to Thailand. This part of Tha Ton, known in Thai as Ban Rom Thai, is inhabited by the Shan ethnic group. The area around Tha Ton is populated by various hill tribes including Yao, Lisu, Lahu, Karen, and Akha. Tha Ton is also home to Chinese nationalists forced to flee from their home-in-exile after the coup in Burma.

== Administration ==
=== Central administration ===
The tambon is divided into 15 administrative villages (mubans).

No.	Name	Thai
1.	Ban Huai Pu	บ้านห้วยปู
2.	Ban Huai Ma Fueang	บ้านห้วยมะเฟื่อง
3.	Ban Tha Ton	บ้านท่าตอน
4.	Ban Huai Nam Yen	บ้านห้วยน้ำเย็น
5.	Ban Hat Chom Phu	บ้านหาดชมภู
6.	Ban San Ton Du	บ้านสันต้นดู่
7.	Ban Tha Makaeng	บ้านท่ามะแกง
8.	Ban Mai Nong Cham	บ้านใหม่หมอกจ๋าม
9.	Ban Mueang Ngam	บ้านเมืองงาม
10.	Ban Huai San	บ้านห้วยส้าน
11.	Ban Huai Mueang Ngam	บ้านหัวเมืองงาม
12.	Ban Pha Tai	บ้านผาใต้
13.	Ban Mueang Ngam Tai	บ้านเมืองงามใต้
14.	Ban Rom Thai	บ้านร่มไทย
15.	Ban Huai Sala	บ้านห้วยศาลา

=== Local administration ===
The sub-district is governed by the sub-district administrative organization (SAO) Tha Ton (องค์การบริหารส่วนตำบลท่าตอน)

== Tourism ==
Tha Ton is on the widely travelled tourist route between Chiang Mai and Chiang Rai. Since the 1970s, riverboat trips between Chiang Rai and Tha Ton have given foreign tourists as well as native Thais the opportunity to visit jungle, observe different ethnic groups, and see the Fang Plain, bringing an influx of capital into the local economy. In the 1980s, this trend continued with the building of several small resorts to accommodate tourists.

=== Wat Tha Ton ===
The village is overlooked by a hilltop Buddhist temple known as Wat Tha Ton. The temple complex includes four huge statues of the Buddha, two in typical Thai-style and two showing Chinese influence. One of these, the standing Buddha, is over 10 m tall. Overall, there are nine stations which include statues or shrines. The eighth station houses the monastery and various shrines. The ninth station is a 2 km walk along a paved footpath with elevation gain.

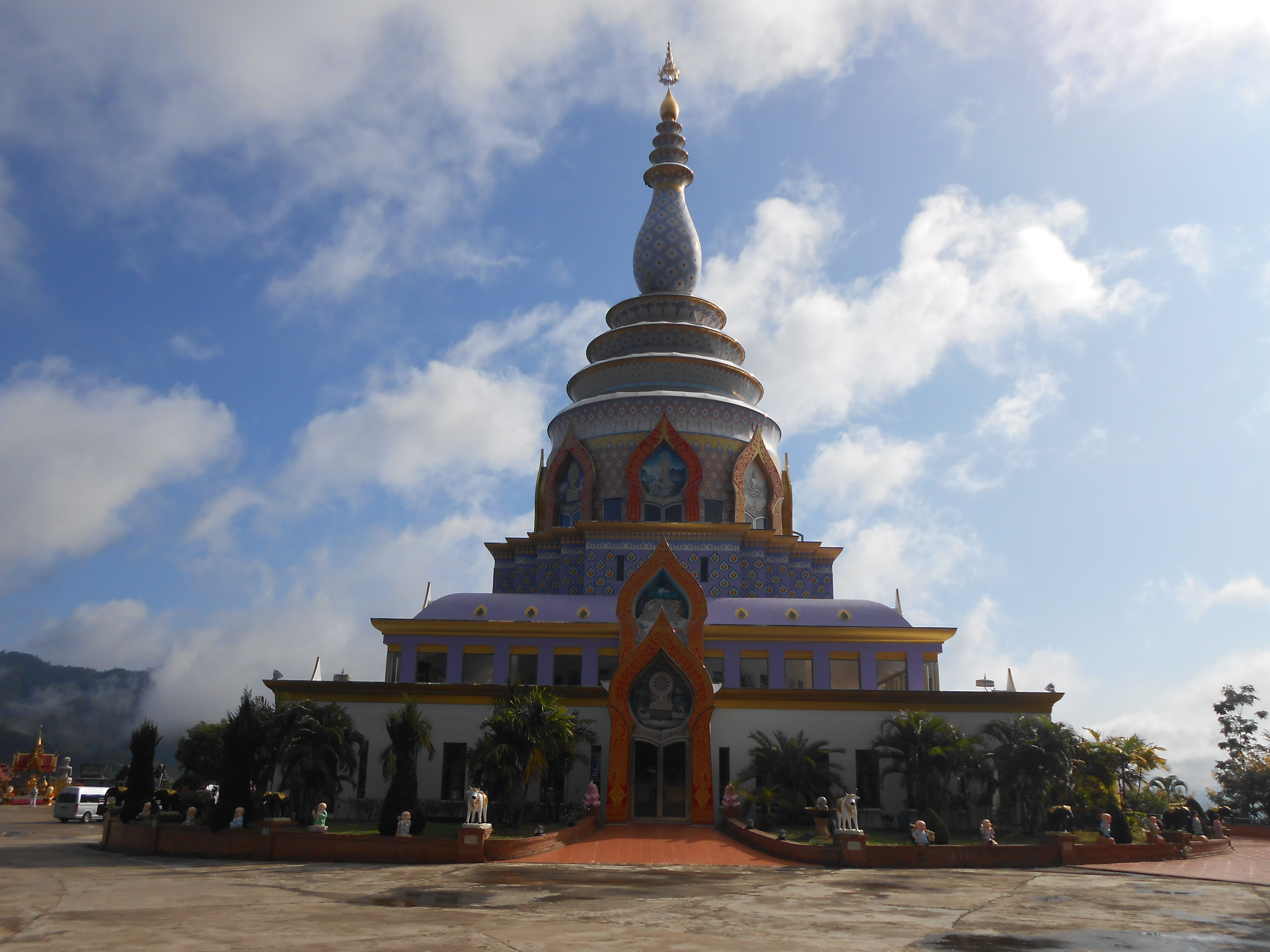

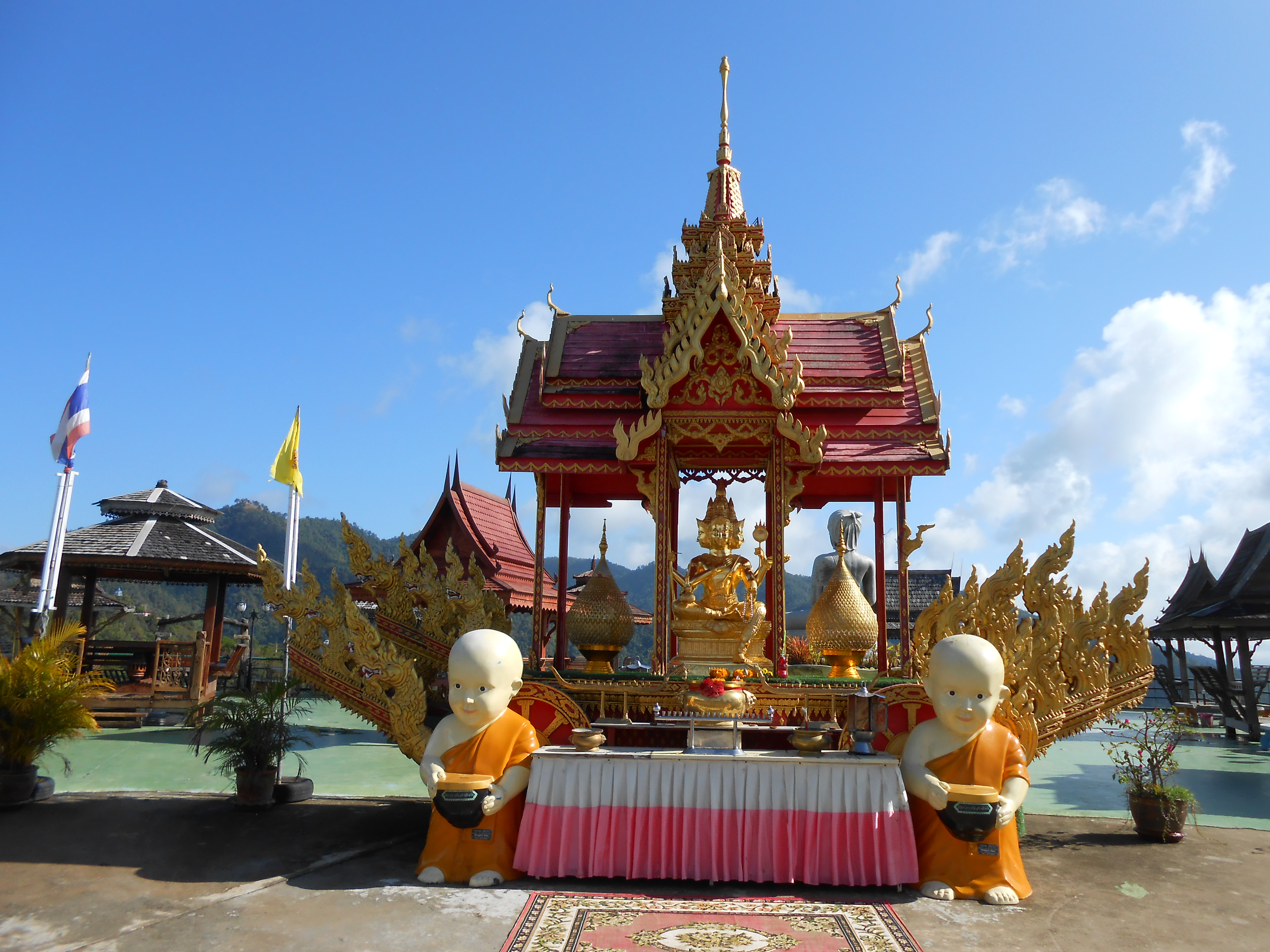

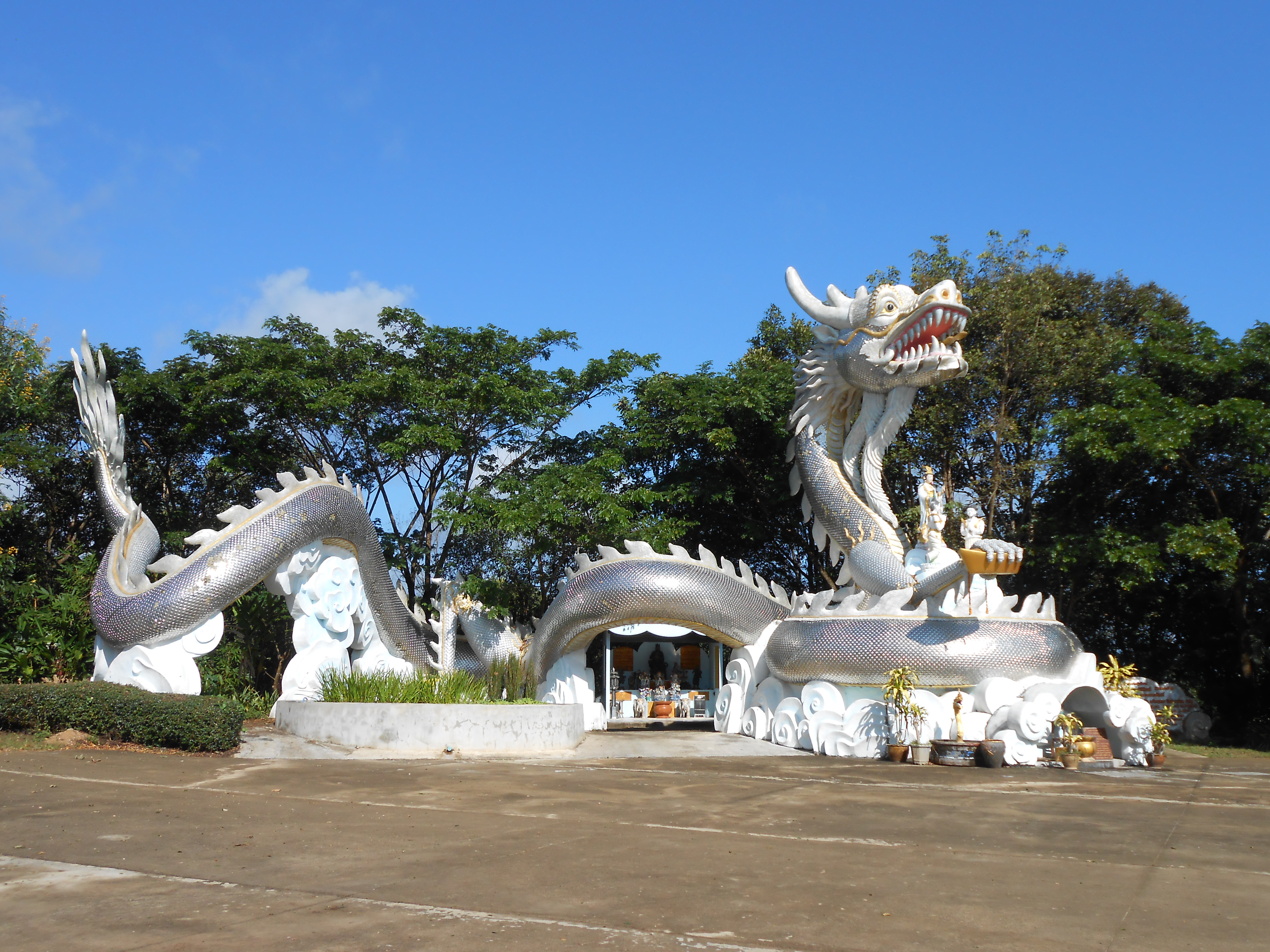

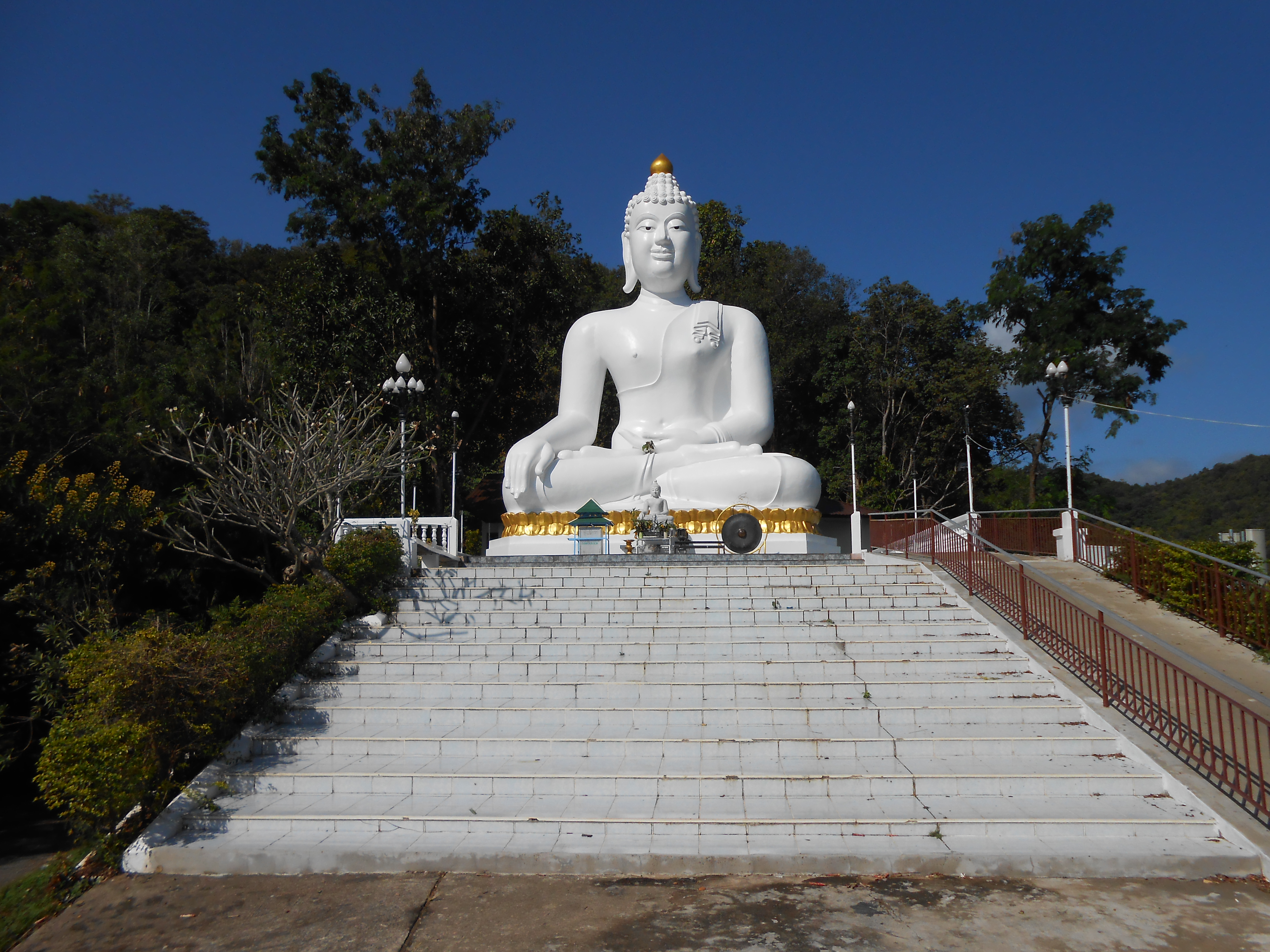

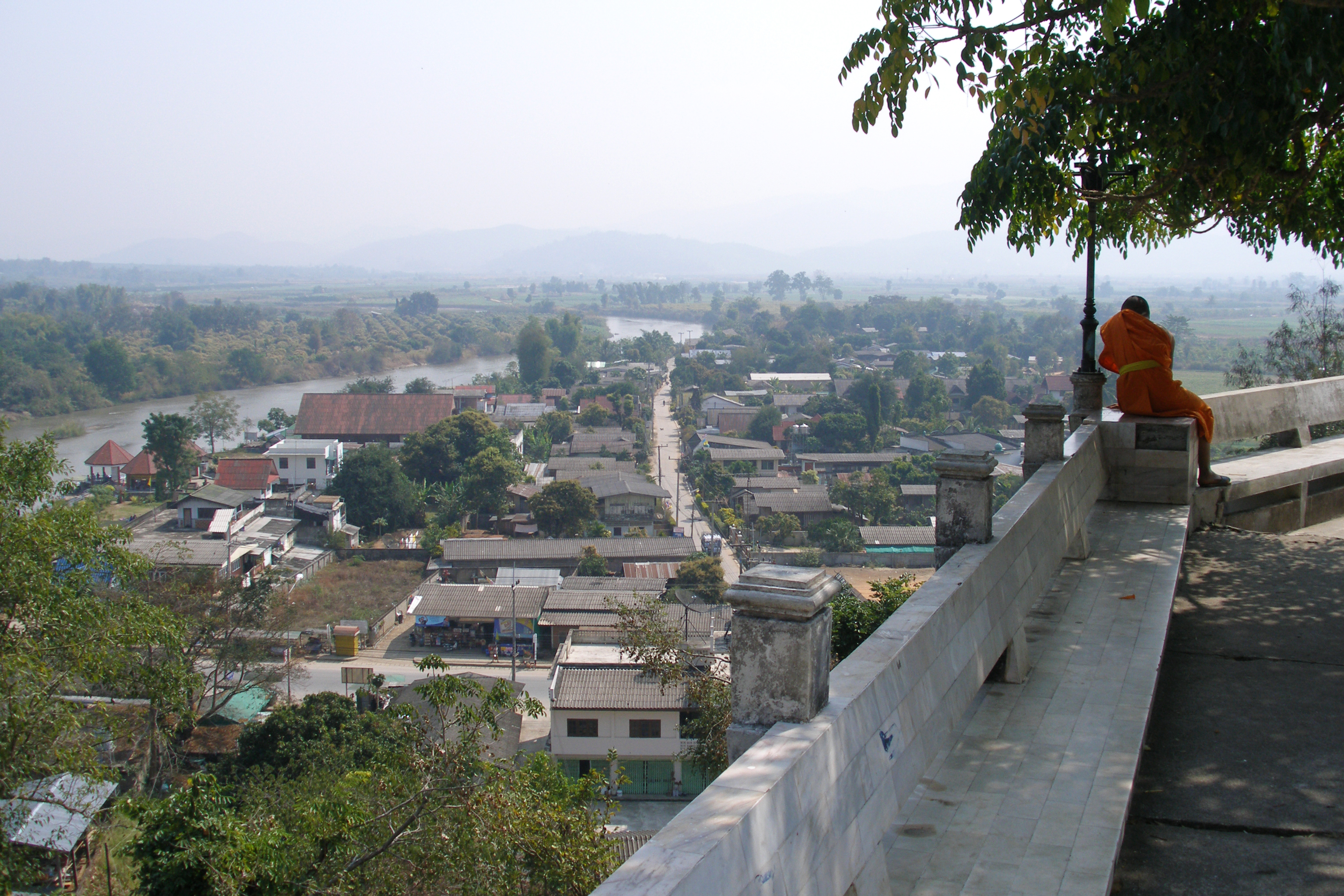

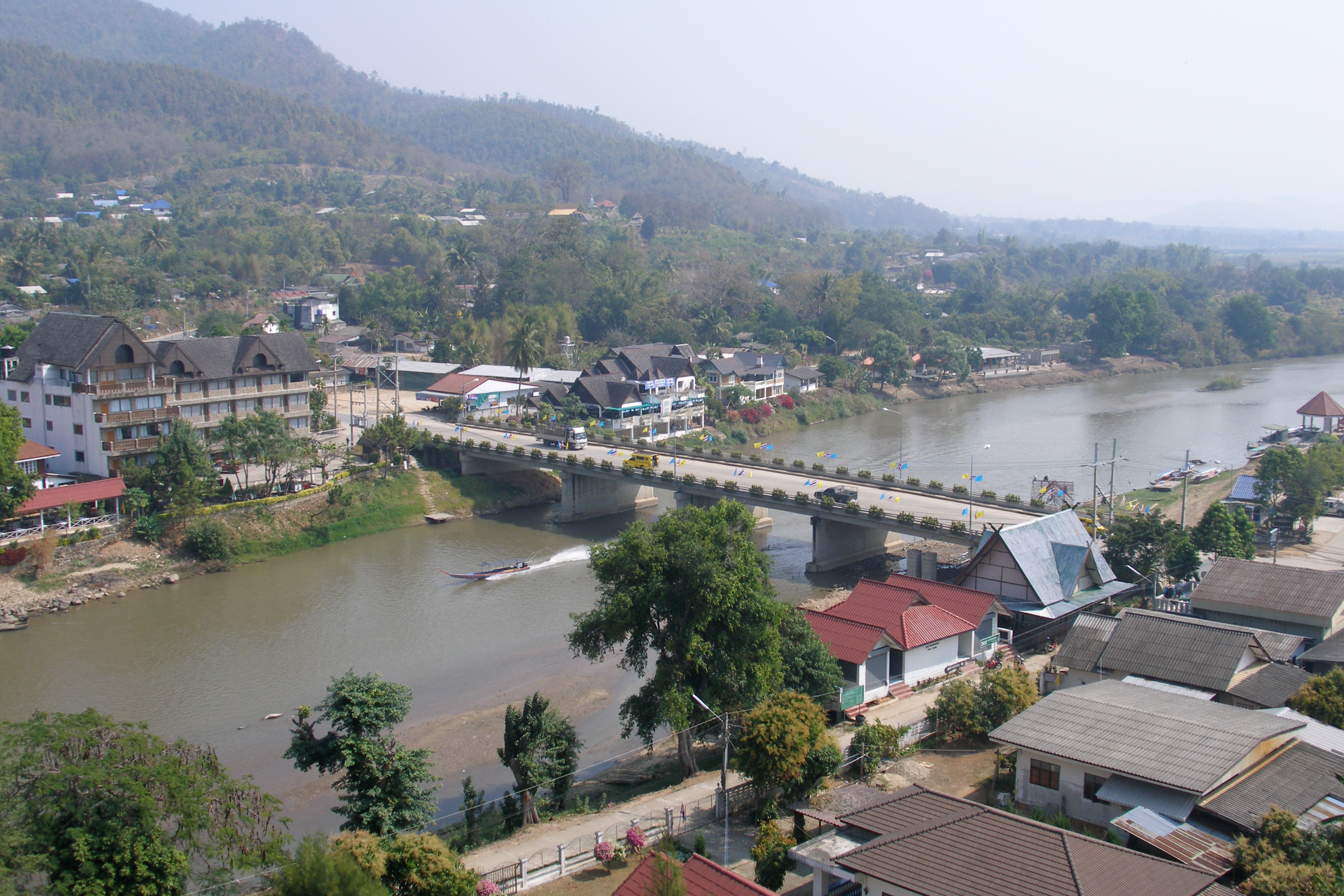

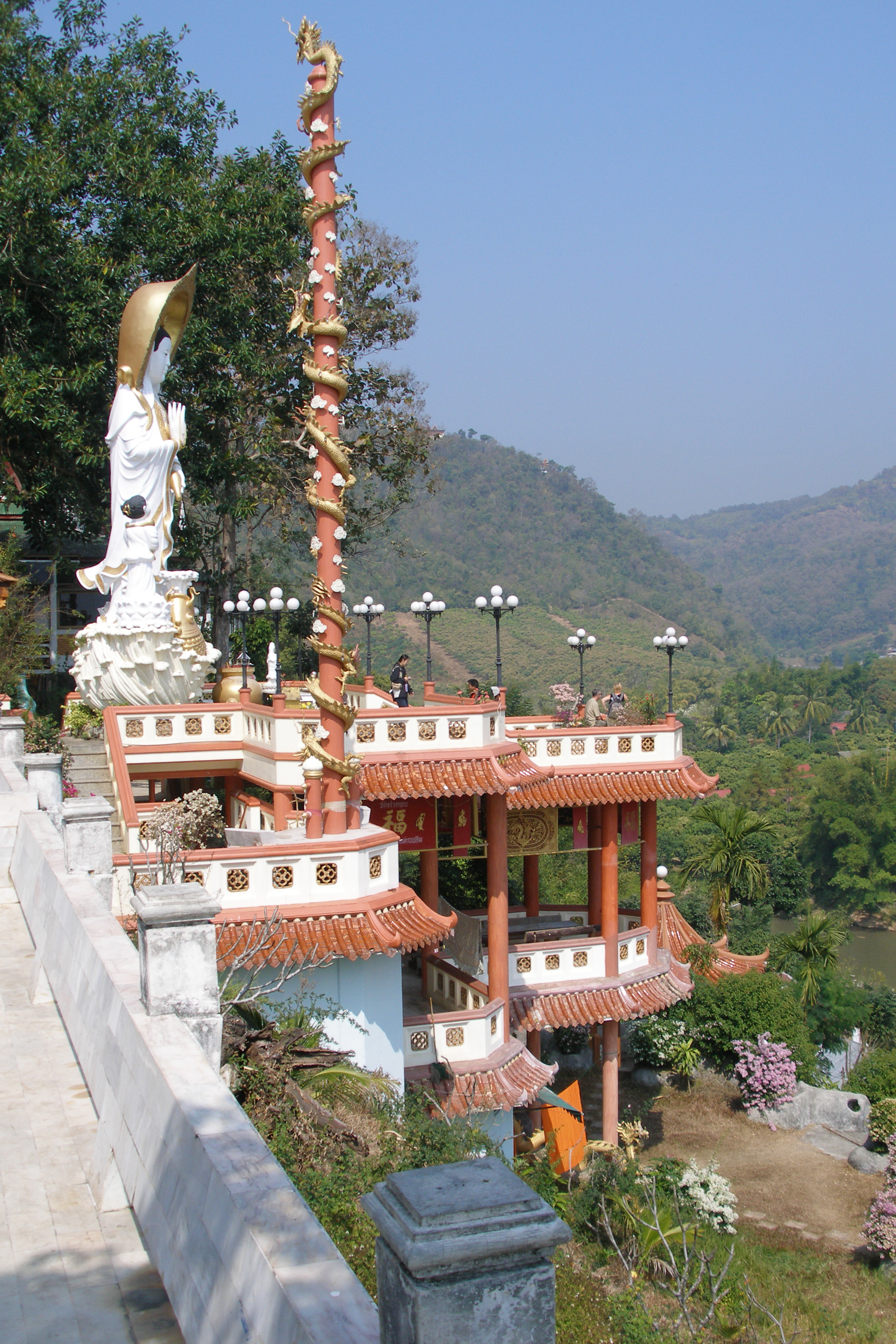

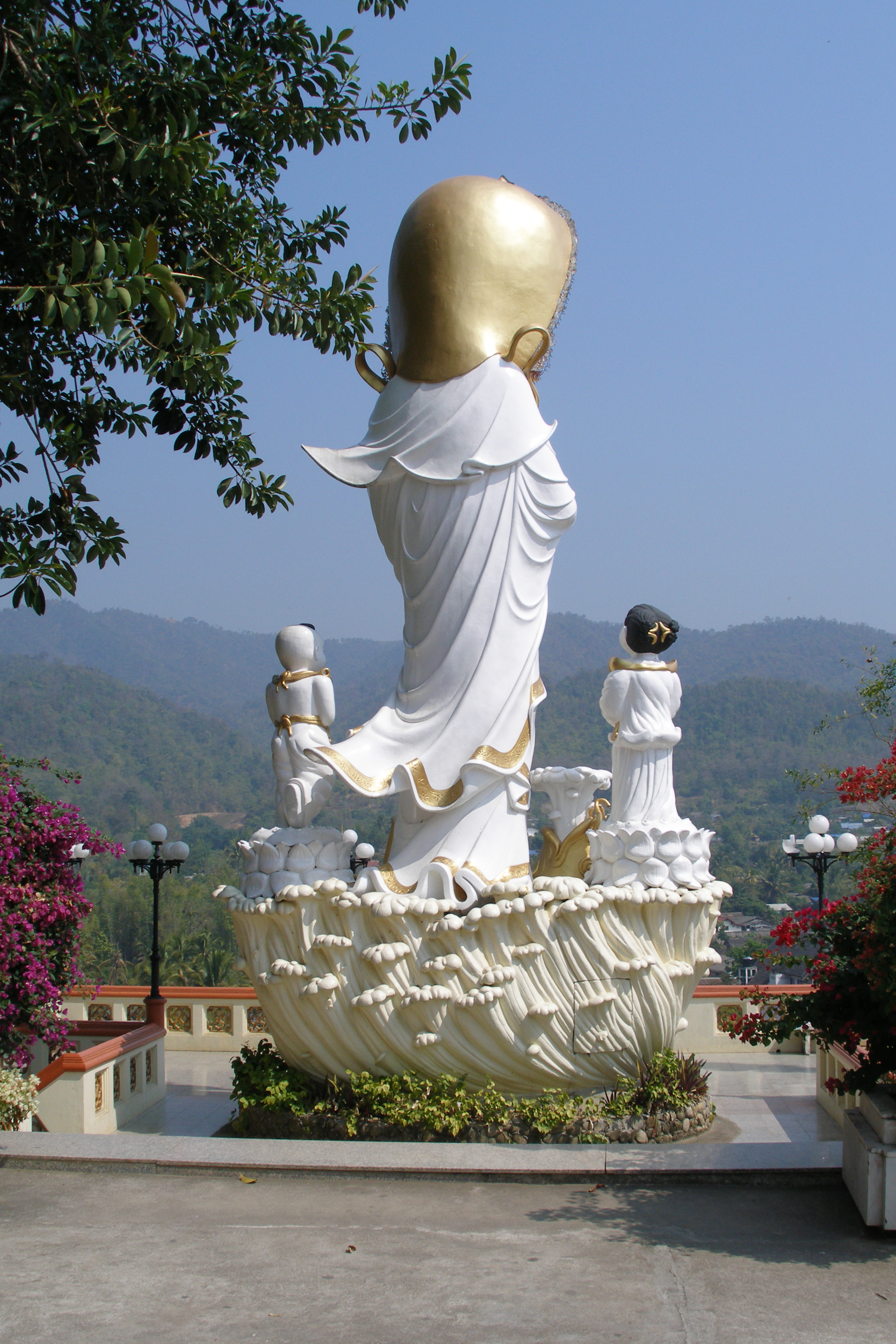

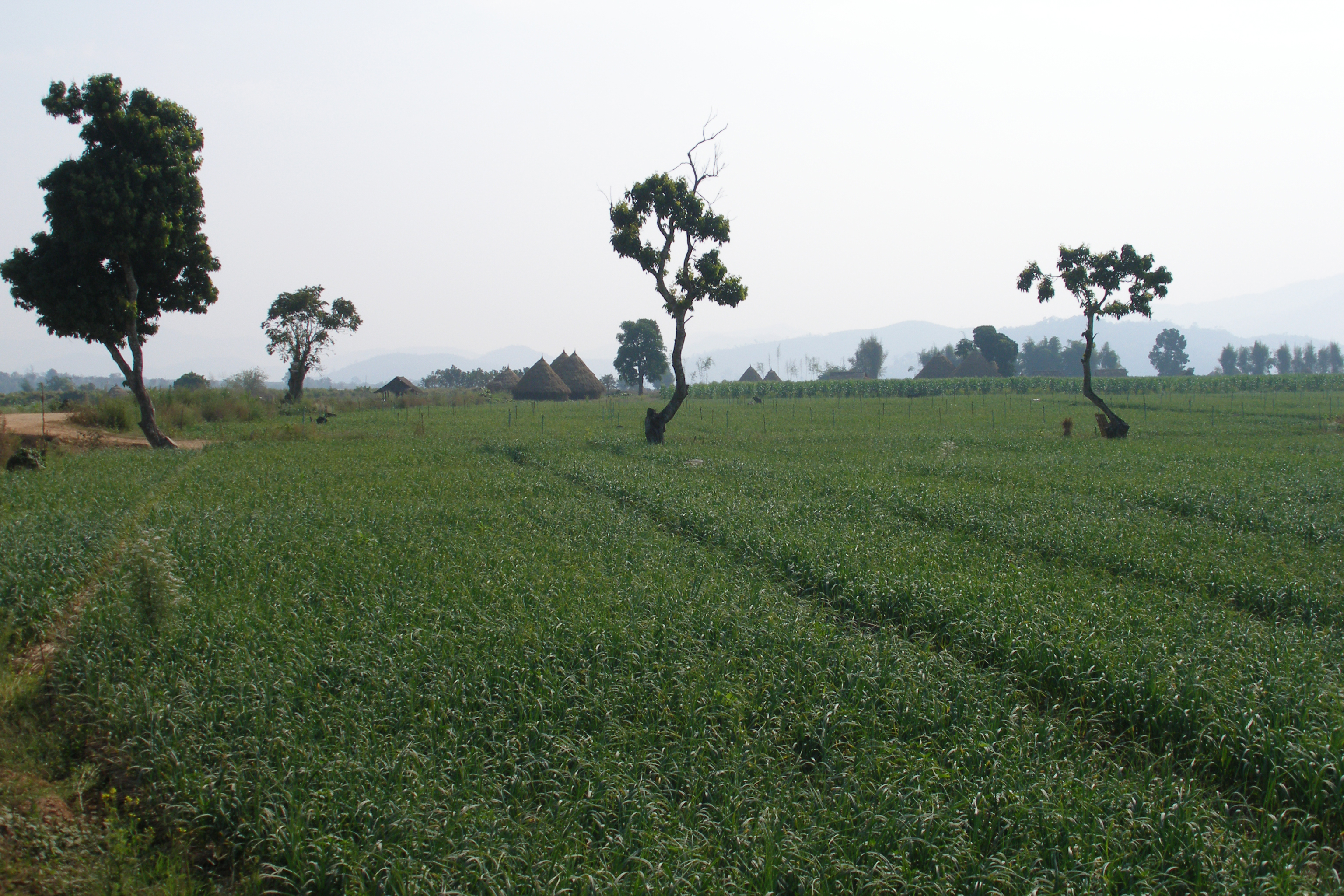

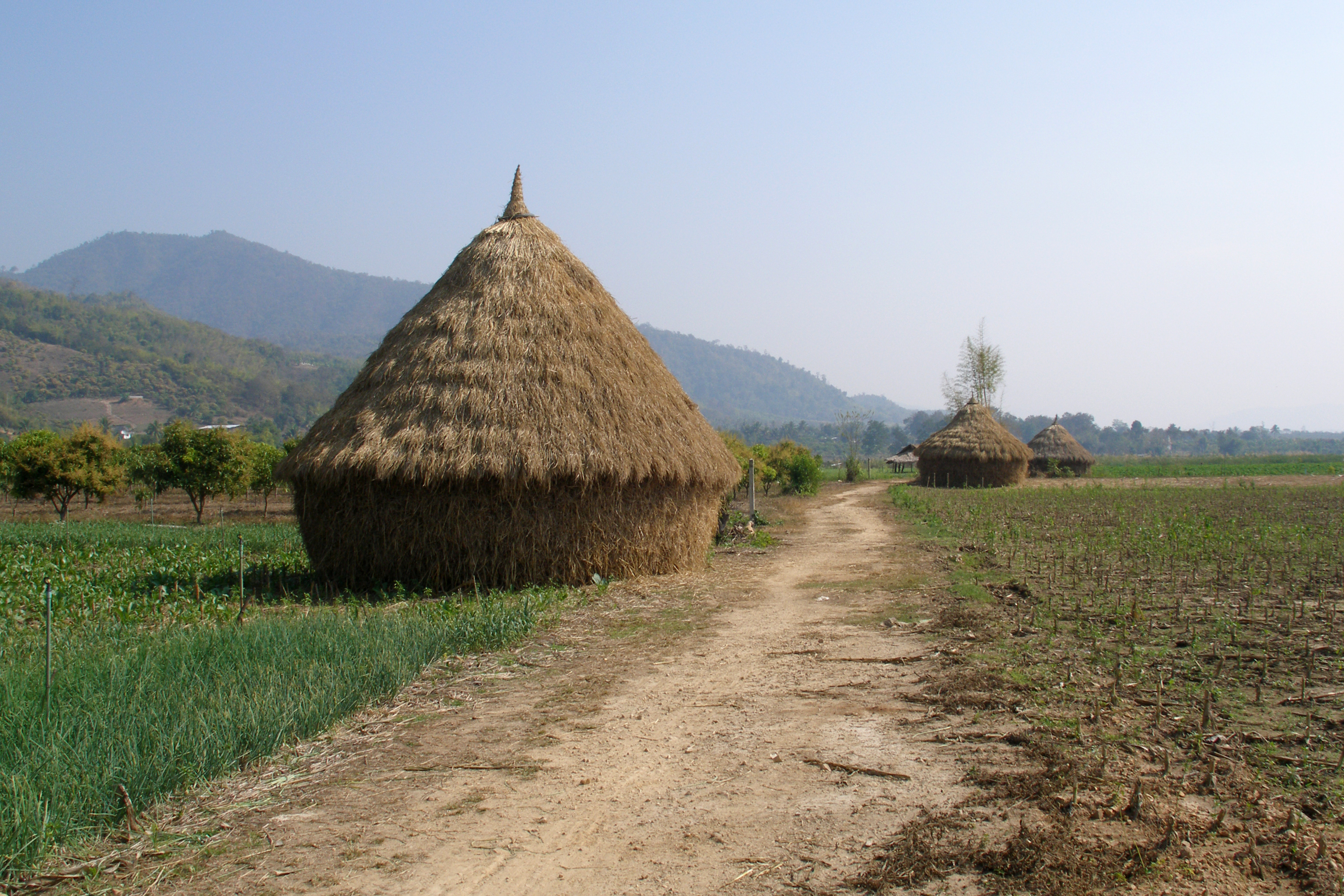
