= Mae Sao =

Mae Sao แม่สาว
- Tambon
- Country: Thailand
- Province: Chiang Mai
- Amphoe: Mae Ai

Population (2020)
  - Total: 12,546
- Time zone: UTC+7 (TST)
- Postal code: 50280
- TIS 1099: 501002

Mae Sao (Thai: แม่สาว) is a tambon (subdistrict) of Mae Ai District, in Chiang Mai Province, Thailand. In 2020 it had a total population of 12,546 people.

== Administration ==
=== Central administration ===
The tambon is subdivided into 16 administrative villages (muban).

No.	Name	Thai
1.	Ban Mae Sao	บ้านแม่สาว
2.	Ban San Manao	บ้านสันมะนาว
3.	Ban Nong Teng	บ้านหนองเต็ง
4.	Ban Huai Pa Sang	บ้านห้วยป่าซาง
5.	Ban Dong	บ้านดง
6.	Ban Mae Hang	บ้านแม่ฮ่าง
7.	Ban Kawila	บ้านกาวีละ
8.	Ban Si Don Kaeo	บ้านศรีดอนแก้ว
9.	Ban San Pa Kha	บ้านสันป่าข่า
10.	Ban Muea Nong	บ้านเมือหนอง
11.	Ban Pancha Phatthana	บ้านปัญจะพัฒนา
12.	Ban San	บ้านสัน
13.	Ban Si Bun Rueang	บ้านศรีบุญเรือง
14.	Ban Mueang Phan	บ้านเมืองพาน
15.	Ban Pong Hai	บ้านโป่งไฮ
16.	Ban Si Wiang	บ้านศรีเวียง

=== Local administration ===
The whole area of the subdistrict is covered by the subdistrict administrative organization (SAO) Mae Sao (องค์การบริหารส่วนตำบลแม่สาว).
