= San Ton Mue =

San Ton Mue สันต้นหมื้อ
- Tambon
- Country: Thailand
- Province: Chiang Mai
- Amphoe: Mae Ai

Population (2020)
  - Total: 6,287
- Time zone: UTC+7 (TST)
- Postal code: 50280
- TIS 1099: 501003

San Ton Mue (Thai: สันต้นหมื้อ) is a tambon (subdistrict) of Mae Ai District, in Chiang Mai Province, Thailand. In 2020 it had a total population of 6,287 people.

== History ==
The subdistrict was created effective September 14, 1976 by splitting off 7 administrative villages from Mae Na Wang.

== Administration ==
=== Central administration ===
The tambon is subdivided into 12 administrative villages (muban).

No.	Name	Thai
1.	Ban Lo	บ้านโล๊ะ
2.	Ban San Po Thong	บ้านสันปอธง
3.	Ban Sai Daeng	บ้านทรายแดง
4.	Ban San Ton Mue	บ้านสันต้นหมื้อ
5.	Ban Hong Ha Noi	บ้านฮ่องห้าน้อย
6.	Ban Mai Kong Sai	บ้านใหม่กองทราย
7.	Ban San Pa Hiao	บ้านสันป่าเหียว
8.	Ban San Po	บ้านสันป๋อ
9.	Ban Pa Hiak	บ้านป่าเหียก
10.	Ban San Lom Choi	บ้านสันลมจอย
11.	Ban Mai Phatthana	บ้านใหม่พัฒนา
12.	Ban Don Mai	บ้านดอนใหม่

=== Local administration ===
The whole area of the subdistrict is covered by the subdistrict administrative organization (SAO) San Ton Mue (องค์การบริหารส่วนตำบลสันต้นหมื้อ).
