= Mae Ai district =

Mae Ai แม่อาย
- District
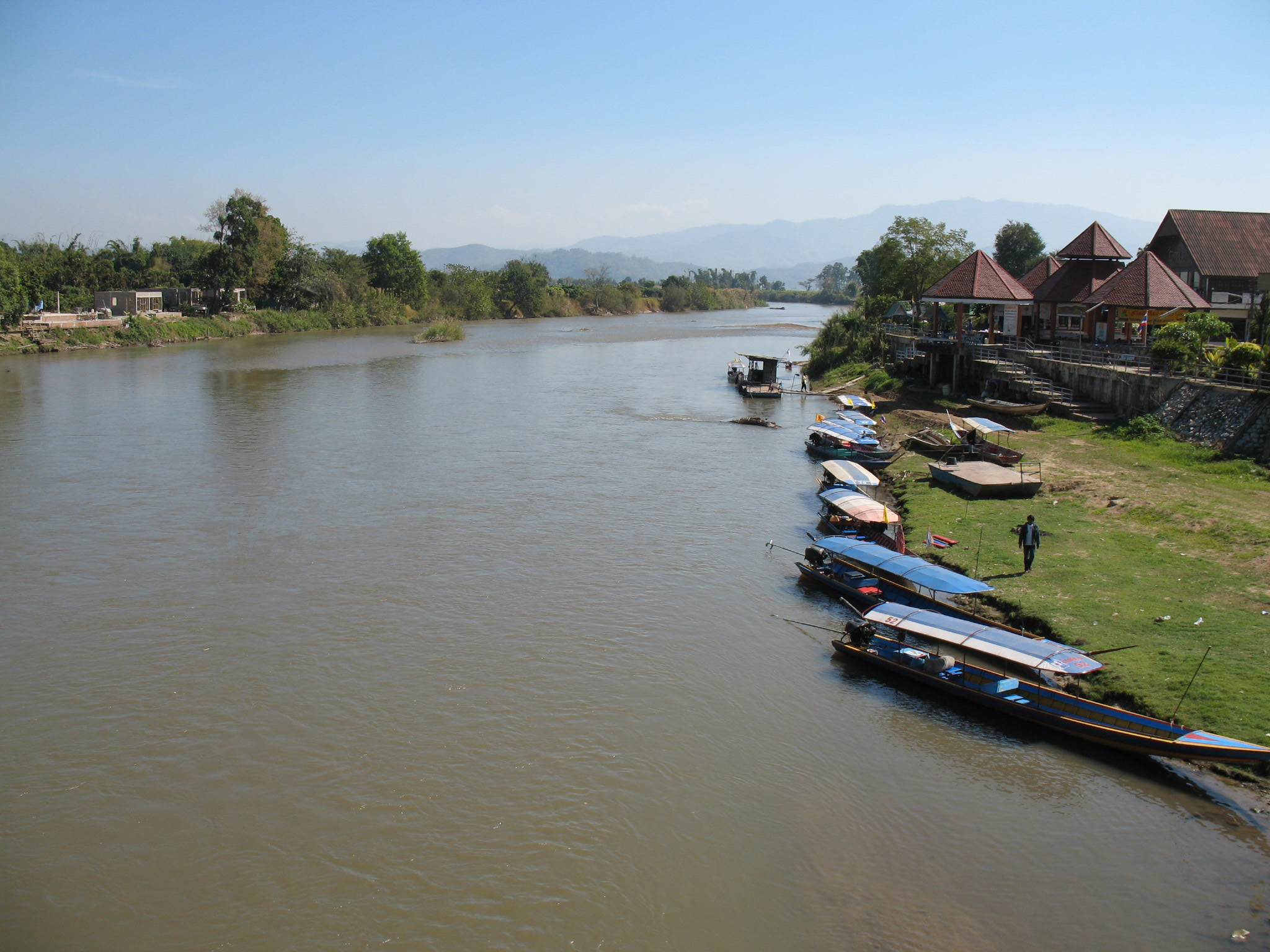
- The Kok River, Mae Ai

- District location in Chiang Mai province
- Coordinates: 20°1′53″N 99°17′13″E
- Country: Thailand
- Province: Chiang Mai
- Seat: Mae Ai
- Tambon: 7
- Muban: 99
- District established: 1967

Area
  - Total: 736.701 km^{2} (284.442 sq mi)

Population (2014)
  - Total: 73,537
  - Density: 104.9/km^{2} (272/sq mi)
- Time zone: UTC+7 (ICT)
- Postal code: 50280
- Geocode: 5010

Mae Ai (Thai: แม่อาย, pronounced [mɛ̂ː ʔāːj]) is the northernmost district (amphoe) of Chiang Mai province, northern Thailand.

== History ==
The minor district (king amphoe) Mae Ai was created on 15 August 1967, when the three tambons Mae Ai, Mae Sao, and Mae Na Wang were separated from Fang district. It was upgraded to a full district on 28 June 1973.

== Geography ==
Neighboring districts are (from the southwest clockwise) Fang of Chiang Mai Province, Shan State of Myanmar, Mae Fa Luang, Mueang Chiang Rai, and Mae Suai of Chiang Rai province.

The important rivers are the Kok and Fang Rivers.

== Administration ==
=== Central administration ===
Mae Ai is divided into seven sub-districts (tambons), which are further divided into 93 administrative villages (mubans).

No.	Name	Thai	Villages	Pop.
1.	Mae Ai	แม่อาย	13	9,699
2.	Mae Sao	แม่สาว	16	12,020
3.	San Ton Mue	สันต้นหมื้อ	12	6,348
4.	Mae Na Wang	แม่นาวาง	17	14,206
5.	Tha Ton	ท่าตอน	15	19,902
6.	Ban Luang	บ้านหลวง	10	7,215
7.	Malika	มะลิกา	10	4,285

=== Local administration ===
There is one sub-district municipality (thesaban tambon) in the district:

- Mae Ai (Thai: เทศบาลตำบลแม่อาย) consisting of parts of the sub-districts Mae Ai, Malika.

There are six sub-district administrative organizations (SAO) in the district:

- Doi Lang (Thai: องค์การบริหารส่วนตำบลดอยลาง) consisting of parts of sub-districts Mae Ai and Malika.
- Mae Sao (Thai: องค์การบริหารส่วนตำบลแม่สาว) consisting of sub-district Mae Sao.
- San Ton Mue (Thai: องค์การบริหารส่วนตำบลสันต้นหมื้อ) consisting of sub-district San Ton Mue.
- Mae Na Wang (Thai: องค์การบริหารส่วนตำบลแม่นาวาง) consisting of sub-district Mae Na Wang.
- Tha Ton (Thai: องค์การบริหารส่วนตำบลท่าตอน) consisting of sub-district Tha Ton.
- Ban Luang (Thai: องค์การบริหารส่วนตำบลบ้านหลวง) consisting of the sub-district Ban Luang.
