= Mae Suai district =

District of Thailand

Mae Suai แม่สรวย
- District
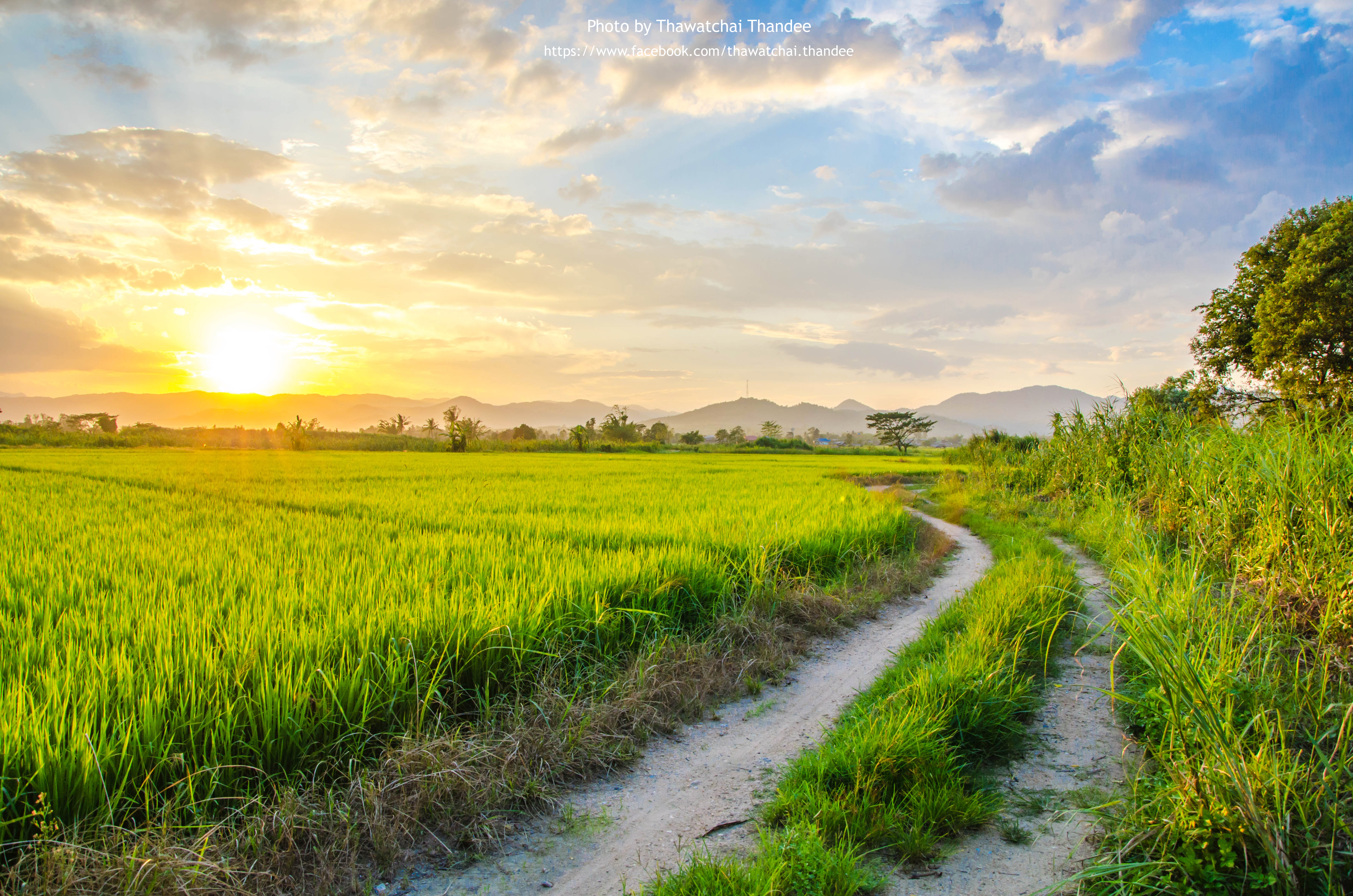
- A rice field in Mae Suai

- District location in Chiang Rai province
- Coordinates: 19°39′23″N 99°32′33″E
- Country: Thailand
- Province: Chiang Rai

Area
  - Total: 1,428.61 km^{2} (551.59 sq mi)

Population (2008)
  - Total: 82,989
  - Density: 56.3/km^{2} (146/sq mi)
- Time zone: UTC+7 (ICT)
- Postal code: 57180
- Geocode: 5710

Mae Suai (Thai: แม่สรวย; IPA: [mɛ̂ː sǔaj]; Northern Thai: ᨾᩯ᩵ᩈᩕ᩠ᩅ᩠ᨿ, IPA: [mɛ̂ː sā.rǔaj]) is a district (amphoe) in the western part of Chiang Rai province, northern Thailand.

== Geography ==
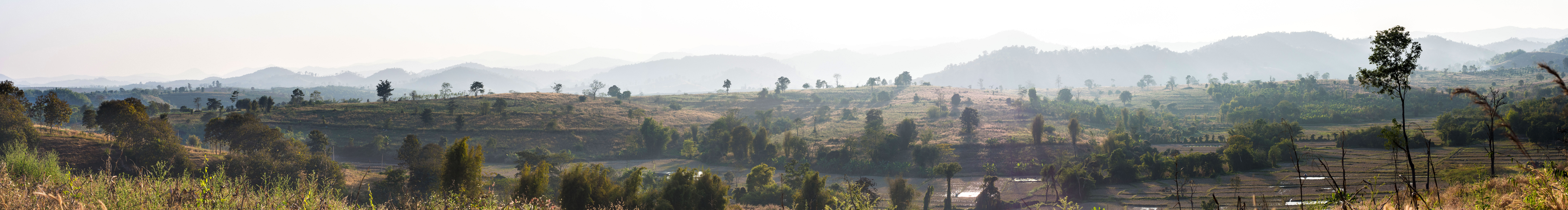
Western edge of the Khun Tan Range, Mae Suai district

Neighboring districts are (from the northeast clockwise): Mueang Chiang Rai, Mae Lao, Phan, Wiang Pa Pao, Phrao, Chai Prakan, Fang, and Mae Ai of Chiang Mai province.

The Khun Tan Range stretches from north to south along the west side of the district. The Suai River, a tributary of the Lao River, gives its name to the district.

== History ==
The district was created in 1905, when the districts Mueang Wiang Pa Pao and Mueang Phong were merged. Originally spelled แม่ซ่วย, the current spelling was adopted before 1917.

== Administration ==
=== Central administration ===
The district Mae Suai is subdivided into 7 subdistricts (Tambon), which are further subdivided into 131 administrative villages (Muban).

No.	Name	Thai	Villages	Pop.
1.	Mae Suai	แม่สรวย	17	9,432
2.	Pa Daet	ป่าแดด	22	11,966
3.	Mae Phrik	แม่พริก	13	5,650
4.	Si Thoi	ศรีถ้อย	12	6,723
5.	Tha Ko	ท่าก๊อ	28	18,468
6.	Wawi	วาวี	27	25,476
7.	Chedi Luang	เจดีย์หลวง	12	7,087

=== Local administration ===
There are 3 subdistrict municipalities (Thesaban Tambon) in the district:

- Mae Suai (Thai: เทศบาลตำบลแม่สรวย) consisting of parts of the subdistrict Mae Suai.
- Chedi Luang (Thai: เทศบาลตำบลเจดีย์หลวง) consisting of parts of the subdistrict Chedi Luang.
- Wiang Suai (Thai: เทศบาลตำบลเวียงสรวย) consisting of parts of the subdistrict Mae Suai.

There are 6 subdistrict administrative organizations (SAO) in the district:

- Pa Daet (Thai: องค์การบริหารส่วนตำบลป่าแดด) consisting of the complete subdistrict Pa Daet.
- Mae Phrik (Thai: องค์การบริหารส่วนตำบลแม่พริก) consisting of the complete subdistrict Mae Phrik.
- Si Thoi (Thai: องค์การบริหารส่วนตำบลศรีถ้อย) consisting of the complete subdistrict Si Thoi.
- Tha Ko (Thai: องค์การบริหารส่วนตำบลท่าก๊อ) consisting of the complete subdistrict Tha Ko.
- Wawi (Thai: องค์การบริหารส่วนตำบลวาวี) consisting of the complete subdistrict Wawi.
- Chedi Luang (Thai: องค์การบริหารส่วนตำบลเจดีย์หลวง) consisting of parts of the subdistrict Chedi Luang.
