= Mae Na Wang =

Mae Na Wang แม่นาวาง
- Tambon
- Interactive map of Mae Na Wang
- Coordinates: 19°59′53″N 99°20′23″E
- Country: Thailand
- Province: Chiang Mai
- Amphoe: Mae Ai

Population (2020)
  - Total: 15,118
- Time zone: UTC+7 (TST)
- Postal code: 50280
- TIS 1099: 501004

Mae Na Wang (Thai: แม่นาวาง) is a tambon (subdistrict) of Mae Ai District, in Chiang Mai Province, Thailand. In 2020 it had a total population of 15,118 people.

== Administration ==
=== Central administration ===
The tambon is subdivided into 17 administrative villages (muban).

No.	Name	Thai
1.	Ban Khai Nok	บ้านคายนอก
2.	Ban Khai Nai	บ้านคายใน
3.	Ban Nong Bua Ngam	บ้านหนองบัวงาม
4.	Ban Hang Tam	บ้านฮ่างต่ำ
5.	Ban Hong Tha Luang	บ้านฮ่องห้าหลวง
6.	Ban Mae Salak	บ้านแม่สลัก
7.	Ban Huai Khok Mu	บ้านห้วยคอกหมู
8.	Ban Huai Muang	บ้านห้วยม่วง
9.	Ban Den Chai	บ้านเด่นชัย
10.	Ban Hong Thon Phatthana	บ้านฮ่องถ่อนพัฒนา
11.	Ban Tha Pu	บ้านท่าปู
12.	Ban Thepphamongkhon	บ้านเทพมงคล
13.	Ban Huai Luang Phatthana	บ้านห้วยหลวงพัฒนา
14.	Ban Mae Mueang Noi	บ้านแม่เมืองน้อย
15.	Ban Khai Nok Phatthana	บ้านคายนอกพัฒนา
16.	Ban Cho Charoen	บ้านจอเจริญ
17.	Ban Mai Rong Khrai	บ้านใหม่ร่องไคร้

=== Local administration ===
The whole area of the subdistrict is covered by the subdistrict administrative organization (SAO) Mae Na Wang (องค์การบริหารส่วนตำบลแม่นาวาง).
