= Mae Ai subdistrict =

Coordinates: 20°01′53″N 99°17′40″E

Mae Ai แม่อาย
- Tambon
- Interactive map of Mae Ai
- Country: Thailand
- Province: Chiang Mai
- District: Mae Ai

Population (2014)
  - Total: 9,699
- Time zone: UTC+7 (ICT)
- Postal code: 50280
- TIS 1099: 501001

Mae Ai (Thai: แม่อาย) is a tambon (subdistrict) of Mae Ai District, in Chiang Mai Province, Thailand. In 2014 it had a population of 9,699.

== Administration ==
=== Central administration ===
The tambon is divided into 13 administrative villages (mubans).

| No. | Name | Thai |
|---|---|---|
| 1. | Ban Doi Kaeo | บ้านดอยแก้ว |
| 2. | Ban Don Chai Tai | บ้านดอนชัยใต้ |
| 3. | Ban Don Chai | บ้านดอนชัย |
| 4. | Ban Mai Pu Chae | บ้านใหม่ปูแช่ |
| 5. | Ban Mae Ai Luang | บ้านแม่อายหลวง |
| 6. | Ban Hong Noi | บ้านโฮ้งน้อย |
| 7. | Ban Hong Luang | บ้านโฮ้งหลวง |
| 8. | Ban Hong Nuea | บ้านโฮ้งเหนือ |
| 9. | Ban Pang Ton Duea | บ้านปางต้นเดื่อ |
| 10. | Ban Mae Laeng | บ้านแม่แหลง |
| 11. | Ban Mae Laeng Luang | บ้านแม่แหลงหลวง |
| 12. | Ban Chana | บ้านจะนะ |
| 13. | Ban Doi Laem | บ้านดอยแหลม |

=== Local administration ===
The area of the subdistrict is shared by two local governments.

- Sub-district municipality (thesaban tambon) Mae Ai (เทศบาลตำบลแม่อาย)
- sub-district administrative organization (SAO) Doi Lang (องค์การบริหารส่วนตำบลดอยลาง)
