= Mae Ai Municipality =

Mae Ai แม่อาย
- Subdistrict Municipality
- Location of the city within Thailand
- Coordinates: 20°1′53″N 99°17′3″E
- Country: Thailand
- Province: Chiang Mai Province

Government
  - Type: Subdistrict municipality

Area
  - Total: 40 km^{2} (15 sq mi)

Population (2014)
  - Total: 8,480
  - Density: 212/km^{2} (550/sq mi)
- Time zone: UTC+7 (Thailand)
- Postal code: 50280

Mae Ai is home to the district headquarters of Mae Ai District in the top of Chiang Mai province, Thailand. 174 km from the city of Chiang Mai and 107 km from City of Chiang Rai.

== History ==
Mae Ai municipality was upgraded form sanitation municipality on May 25, 1999. It governs 10 Mubans of Mae Ai Subdistrict and 7 Mubans of Malika Subdistrict.

== Agriculture ==
The agriculture in Mae Ai is highly competitive, diversified and specialised and it produced in significant amounts include rice, pepper, orange, lychee, longan etc. Agriculture is one of its main economic activities.
