= Mae Kha =

Mae Kha may refer to:

- Mae Kha Subdistrict (50091000) (แม่คะ), a subdistrict in Fang District, Chiang Mai Province, Thailand
- Mae Kha Subdistrict (50091100) (แม่ข่า), a subdistrict in Fang District, Chiang Mai Province, Thailand
- Mae Kha moat, a former stream and moat of the city of Chiang Mai, Thailand

== See also ==
- Mae Ka (disambiguation)
