= Chai Prakan =

Chai Prakan ไชยปราการ
- Subdistrict Municipality
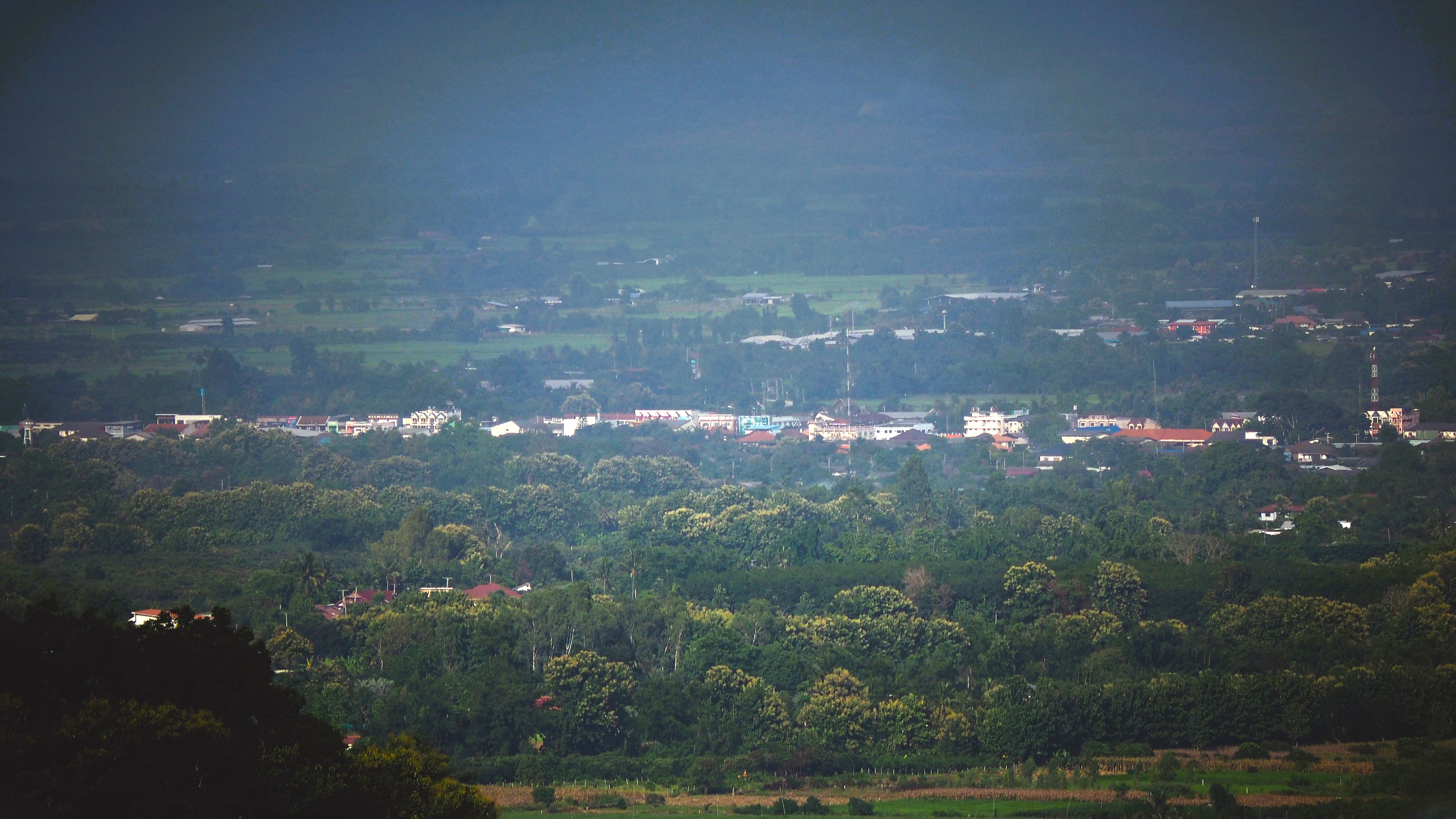
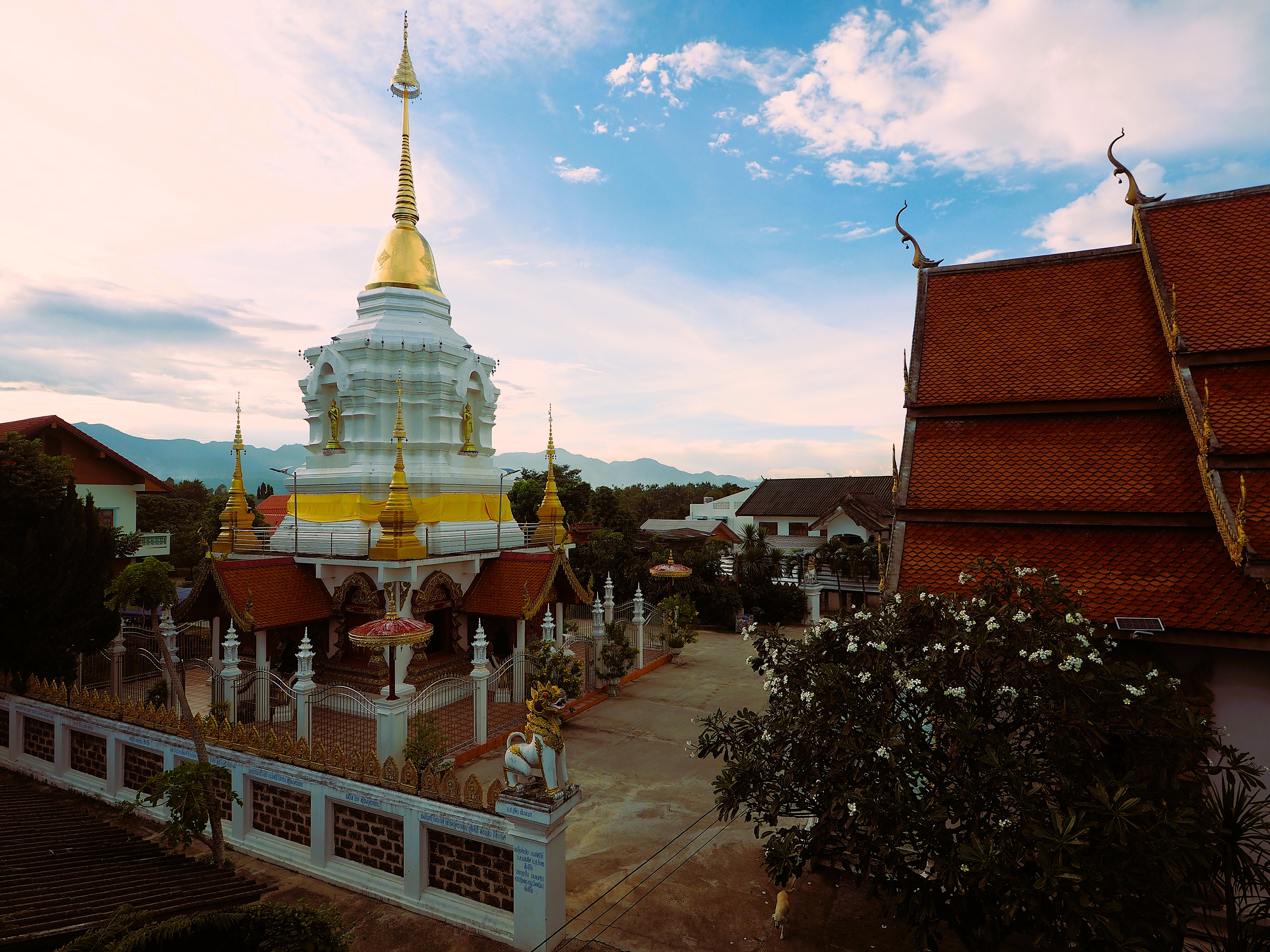
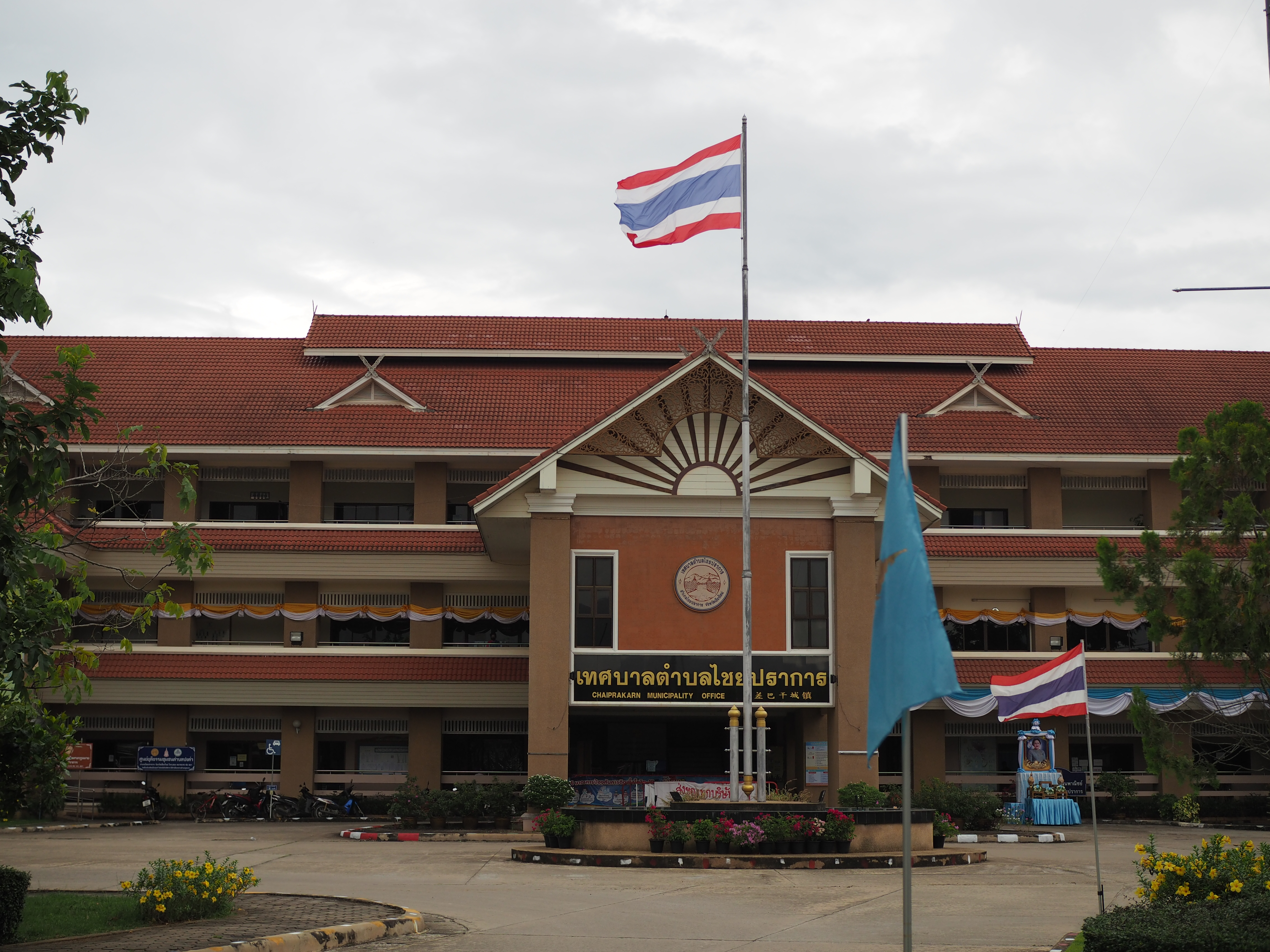
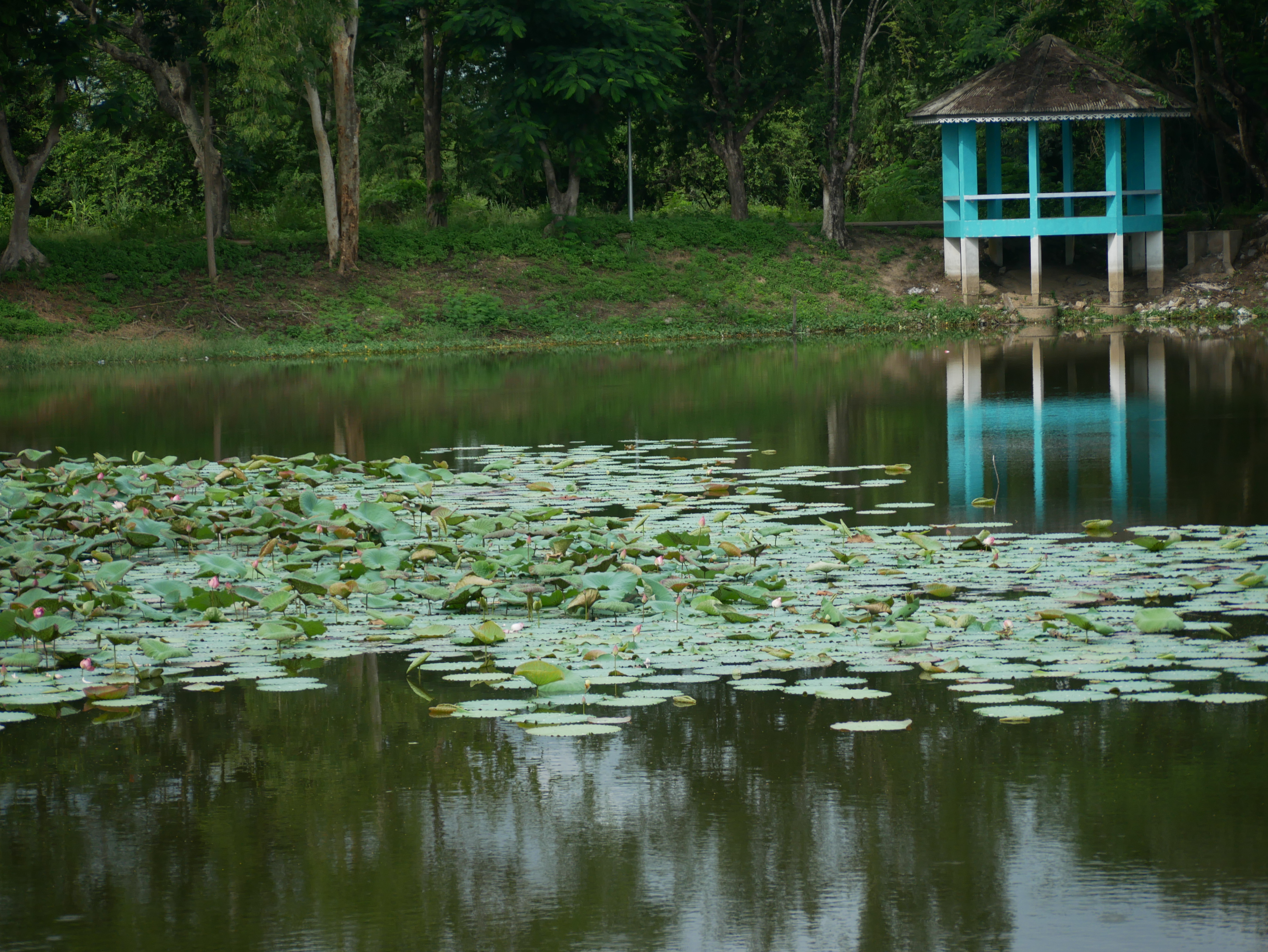
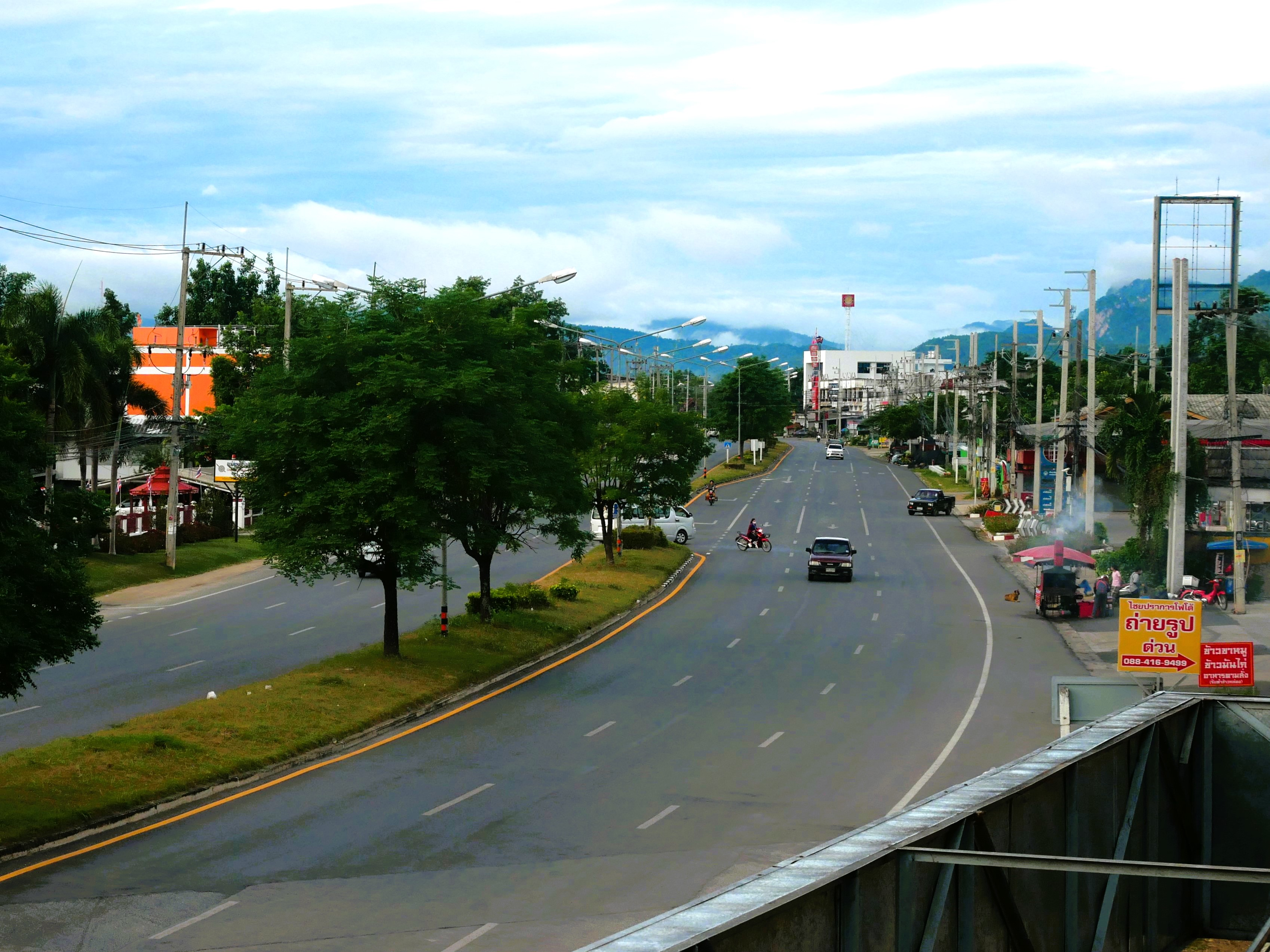
- From top, left to right: View of Chai Prakan, Wat Supattanaram, Chai Prakan Subdistrict Municipality building, Nong Bua Kham public park, the Highway No.107

- Location of Chai Prakan within Thailand
- Coordinates: 19°43′56″N 99°8′25″E
- Country: Thailand
- Province: Chiang Mai Province

Government
  - Type: Subdistrict municipality

Area
  - Total: 49.13 km^{2} (18.97 sq mi)

Population (2014)
  - Total: 16,090
  - Density: 31/km^{2} (80/sq mi)
- Time zone: UTC+7 (ICT)
- Website: www.chaiprakarn.go.th

Chai Prakan, sometimes written as Chaiprakan, Chaiprakarn or Chaiprakhan, is home to the district headquarters of Chai Prakan District in the far north of Chiang Mai Province, Thailand. It lies 145 km from the city of Chiang Mai and 850 km from Bangkok. It is a popular location for vehicles to stop on the way to Doi Ang Khang, Fang, and Tha Ton.

The municipality covers the complete subdistrict Pong Tam and parts of the subdistricts Si Dong Yen and Nong Bua, all within Chai Prakan district.

== History ==
The historical Chai Prakan was founded in 973 as part of the Sinhanavati Kingdom but the city fell in 998. The Chai Prakan archaeological site is in Fang District, 12 km from the town of Fang.

The current local government was established as a sanitary district in 1994. Like all sanitary districts, it was upgraded to a subdistrict municipality in 1999.

== Administrative Area ==
Chai Prakan Subdistrict Municipality covers a total area of 49.13 square kilometers. It includes parts of 3 subdistricts and 20 villages of Chai Prakan District, as follows:

=== Pong Tam Subdistrict ===
1. Ban Pong Tam, Village No. 1, Pong Tam Subdistrict
2. Ban Tha, Village No. 2, Pong Tam Subdistrict
3. Ban Pang Khwai, Village No. 3, Pong Tam Subdistrict
4. Ban Mit Aran, Village No. 4, Pong Tam Subdistrict
5. Ban Pa Ruak, Village No. 5, Pong Tam Subdistrict
6. Ban Huai Muang, Village No. 6, Pong Tam Subdistrict
7. Ban Huai Bong, Village No. 7, Pong Tam Subdistrict
8. Ban Thung Yao, Village No. 8, Pong Tam Subdistrict

=== Nong Bua Subdistrict ===
1. Ban Den, Village No. 1, Nong Bua Subdistrict
2. Ban Huai Phai, Village No. 2, Nong Bua Subdistrict
3. Ban Nong Bua, Village No. 3, Nong Bua Subdistrict

=== Si Dong Yen Subdistrict ===
1. Ban Mae Khi, Village No. 1, Si Dong Yen Subdistrict
2. Ban Mae Khi Lai Fang, Village No. 2, Si Dong Yen Subdistrict
3. Ban Si Dong Yen, Village No. 3, Si Dong Yen Subdistrict
4. Ban Intharam, Village No. 4, Si Dong Yen Subdistrict
5. Ban Ai, Village No. 5, Si Dong Yen Subdistrict
6. Ban Sai Khao, Village No. 7, Si Dong Yen Subdistrict
7. Ban Dong Pa Sak, Village No. 9, Si Dong Yen Subdistrict
8. Ban Chiang Man, Village No. 15, Si Dong Yen Subdistrict
9. Ban Mai Si Dong Yen, Village No. 17, Si Dong Yen Subdistrict

== Climate ==
Chai Prakan District has a tropical savanna climate (Köppen Aw), with warm to hot weather throughout the year and distinct wet and dry seasons. April is generally the hottest month, while January is the coolest. The rainy season generally begins in late April and lasts until October, with the highest rainfall occurring in August. The following climate data are based on historical weather analysis and climate models for Chai Prakan, rather than direct measurements from a long-term meteorological station.

Climate data for Chai Prakan
Month	Jan	Feb	Mar	Apr	May	Jun	Jul	Aug	Sep	Oct	Nov	Dec	Year
Mean daily maximum °C (°F)	27.2 (81.0)	30.0 (86.0)	32.8 (91.0)	33.9 (93.0)	32.2 (90.0)	30.6 (87.1)	30.0 (86.0)	29.4 (84.9)	30.0 (86.0)	29.4 (84.9)	27.8 (82.0)	26.1 (79.0)	30.0 (85.9)
Daily mean °C (°F)	19.4 (66.9)	21.7 (71.1)	24.4 (75.9)	26.7 (80.1)	26.7 (80.1)	26.7 (80.1)	26.1 (79.0)	26.1 (79.0)	25.6 (78.1)	24.4 (75.9)	22.2 (72.0)	19.4 (66.9)	24.3 (75.7)
Mean daily minimum °C (°F)	13.3 (55.9)	14.4 (57.9)	17.2 (63.0)	20.6 (69.1)	22.8 (73.0)	23.9 (75.0)	23.3 (73.9)	23.3 (73.9)	22.8 (73.0)	21.1 (70.0)	17.8 (64.0)	14.4 (57.9)	19.6 (67.2)
Average precipitation mm (inches)	7.6 (0.30)	5.1 (0.20)	17.8 (0.70)	55.9 (2.20)	139.7 (5.50)	127.0 (5.00)	172.7 (6.80)	223.5 (8.80)	195.6 (7.70)	86.4 (3.40)	38.1 (1.50)	10.2 (0.40)	1,080 (42.5)
Average precipitation days (≥ 1.0 mm)	0.7	0.7	2.3	7.8	15.4	15.2	19.1	20.9	17.4	10.1	3.9	1.1	114.6
Source: WeatherSpark

== See also ==
- Chai Prakan District
- Nong Bua
- Fang (town)
