= Pong Nam Ron =

Pong Nam Ron is the name of several places in Thailand:

- Pong Nam Ron district, Chanthaburi province
- Pong Nam Ron subdistrict, Pong Nam Ron district, Chanthaburi province
- Pong Nam Ron subdistrict municipality, Pong Nam Ron district, Chanthaburi province
- Pong Nam Ron subdistrict, Fang district, Chiang Mai province
- Pong Nam Ron subdistrict, Khlong Lan district, Kamphaeng Phet province
