= Nong Bua =

Nong Bua may refer to:

- Nong Bua district, Nakhon Sawan province, Thailand
- Nong Bua, Chiang Mai, subdistrict of Chai Prakan district, Chiang Mai province, Thailand
- Nong Bua Subdistrict Municipality, Subdistrict Municipality in Chai Prakan district, Chiang Mai province, Thailand
- List of tambon in Thailand (N–O), including several places called Nong Bua

== See also ==
- Nong Boua, Bolikhamsai, Laos
- Nong Bua Junction railway station, in Taling Chan subdistrict, Saraburi city, Saraburi province, Thailand
- Nong Bua Lamphu province, Thailand
  - Nong Bua Lamphu, a town
- Nong Bua City F.C., a football club
- Nong Bua Daeng district, Chaiyaphum province, Thailand
- Nong Bua Rawe district, Chaiyaphum province, Thailand
