= Pong Tam =

Pong Tam ปงตำ
- Subdistrict
- Catholic church located in Ban Huai Bong
- Country: Thailand
- Province: Chiang Mai
- District: Chai Prakan

Population (2016)
  - Total: 8,087
- Time zone: UTC+7 (ICT)
- Postal code: 50320
- TIS 1099: 502101

Pong Tam (Thai: ปงตำ) is a tambon (subdistrict) of Chai Prakan District, in Chiang Mai Province, Thailand. In 2016 it had a population of 8,087 people.

== History ==
Pong Tam was originally a subdistrict of Fang District. On 1 January 1988 it was one of four subdistricts split off from Fang to form Chai Prakan District.

== Administration ==
=== Central administration ===
The tambon is divided into eight administrative villages (mubans).

No.	Name	Thai
1.	Ban Pong Tam	บ้านปงตำ
2.	Ban Tha	บ้านท่า
3.	Ban Pang Khwai	บ้านปางควาย
4.	Ban Mit Aran	บ้านมิตรอรัญ
5.	Ban Pa Ruak	บ้านป่ารวก
6.	Ban Huai Muang	บ้านห้วยม่วง
7.	Ban Huai Bong	บ้านห้วยบง
8.	Ban Thung Yao	บ้านทุ่งยาว

=== Local administration ===
The subdistrict is covered by the subdistrict municipality (thesaban tambon) Chai Prakan (เทศบาลตำบลไชยปราการ).
