= Mae Ngon =

Coordinates: 19.8021°N 99.1614°E

Mae Ngon แม่งอน
- Tambon
- Interactive map of Mae Ngon
- Country: Thailand
- Province: Chiang Mai
- District: Fang

Population (2005)
  - Total: 17,715
- Time zone: UTC+7 (ICT)

Mae Ngon (Thai: แม่งอน) is a tambon (subdistrict) of Fang District, in Chiang Mai Province, Thailand. In 2005 it had a population of 17,715 people. The tambon contains 18 villages.
