= Mae Ka =

Mae Ka may refer to several places in Thailand:

- Mae Ka, Chiang Mai
- Mae Ka, Phayao

== See also ==
- Mae Kha (disambiguation)
