= Chai Prakan district =

Chai Prakan ไชยปราการ
- District
- Doi Wiang Pha

- District location in Chiang Mai province
- Coordinates: 19°43′56″N 99°8′25″E
- Country: Thailand
- Province: Chiang Mai
- Seat: Pong Tam

Area
  - Total: 510.9 km^{2} (197.3 sq mi)

Population (2014)
  - Total: 44,760
  - Density: 93.8/km^{2} (243/sq mi)
- Time zone: UTC+7 (ICT)
- Postal code: 50320
- Geocode: 5021

Chai Prakan (Thai: ไชยปราการ, pronounced [tɕʰāj prāː.kāːn]; Northern Thai: ไจยผาก๋าร, pronounced [tɕāj pʰǎː.kǎːn]) is a district (amphoe) in the northern part of Chiang Mai province in northern Thailand.

== Geography ==
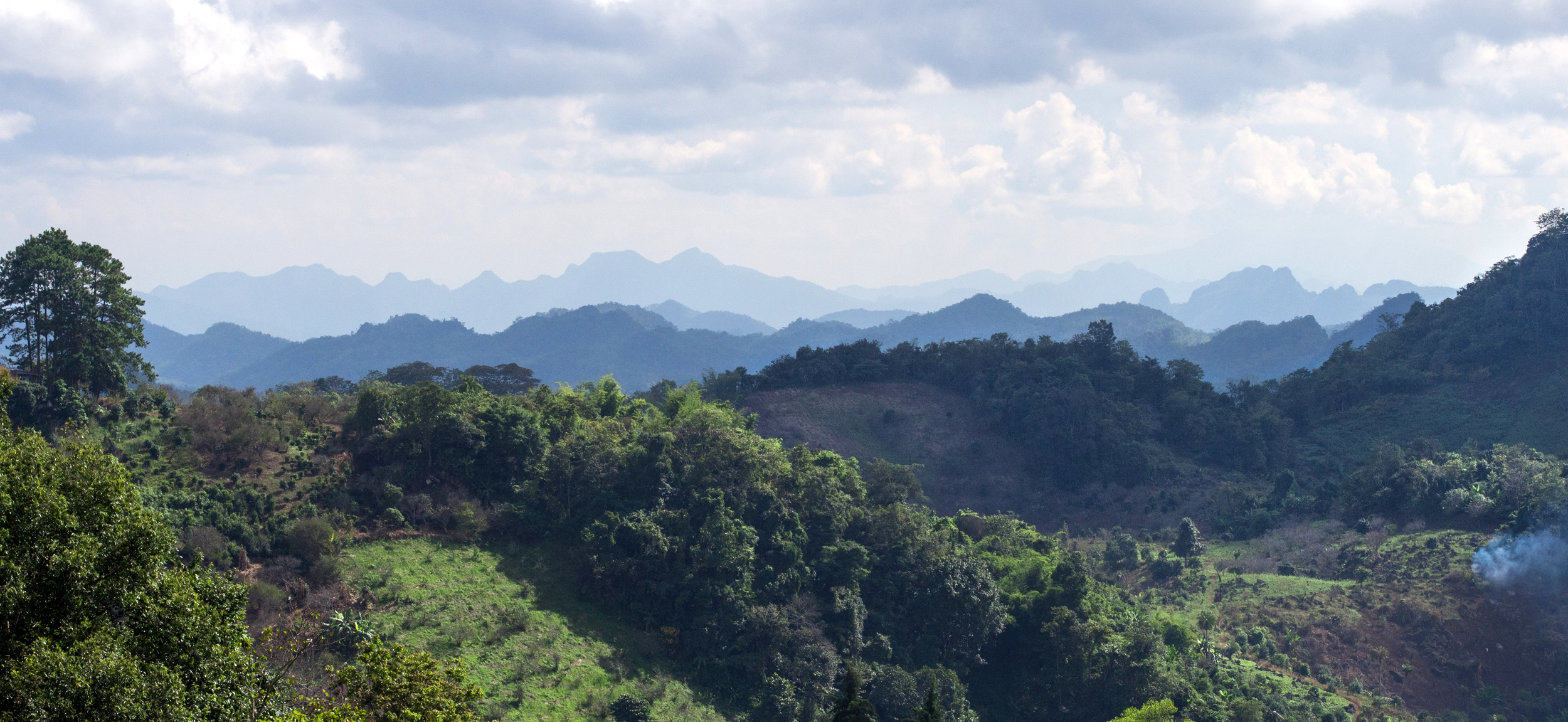
View from Rte 1340 in Chai Prakan District of the Daen Lao Range

Neighbouring districts are (from the south clockwise) Phrao, Chiang Dao, Fang of Chiang Mai Province and Mae Suai of Chiang Rai province.

The Khun Tan Range stretches from north to south along the eastern side of the district. The western tip of the district lies within the Daen Lao Range.

== History ==
The minor district (king amphoe) Chai Prakarn was created on 1 January 1988, when four tambons were split off from Fang District. It was upgraded to a full district on 4 July 1994.

== Administration ==
=== Central administration ===
Chai Prakan is divided into four sub-districts (tambons), which are further subdivided into 44 administrative villages (muban).

| No. | Name | Thai | Villages | Pop. |
|---|---|---|---|---|
| 1. | Pong Tam | ปงตำ | 8 | 8,032 |
| 2. | Si Dong Yen | ศรีดงเย็น | 18 | 15,329 |
| 3. | Mae Thalop | แม่ทะลบ | 7 | 7,314 |
| 4. | Nong Bua | หนองบัว | 11 | 14,085 |

=== Local administration ===
There are two sub-district municipalities (thesaban tambon) in the district:

- Chai Prakan (Thai: เทศบาลตำบลไชยปราการ) consisting of sub-district Pong Tam and parts of sub-districts Si Dong Yen and Nong Bua.
- Nong Bua Subdistrict Municipality (Thai: เทศบาลตำบลหนองบัว) consisting of parts of sub-district Nong Bua.

There are two sub-district administrative organizations (SAO) in the district:

- Si Dong Yen (Thai: องค์การบริหารส่วนตำบลศรีดงเย็น) consisting of parts of sub-district Si Dong Yen.
- Mae Thalop (Thai: องค์การบริหารส่วนตำบลแม่ทะลบ) consisting of sub-district Mae Thalop.
