= Fang (town) =

Fang ฝาง
- Subdistrict Municipality
- Wiang Fang
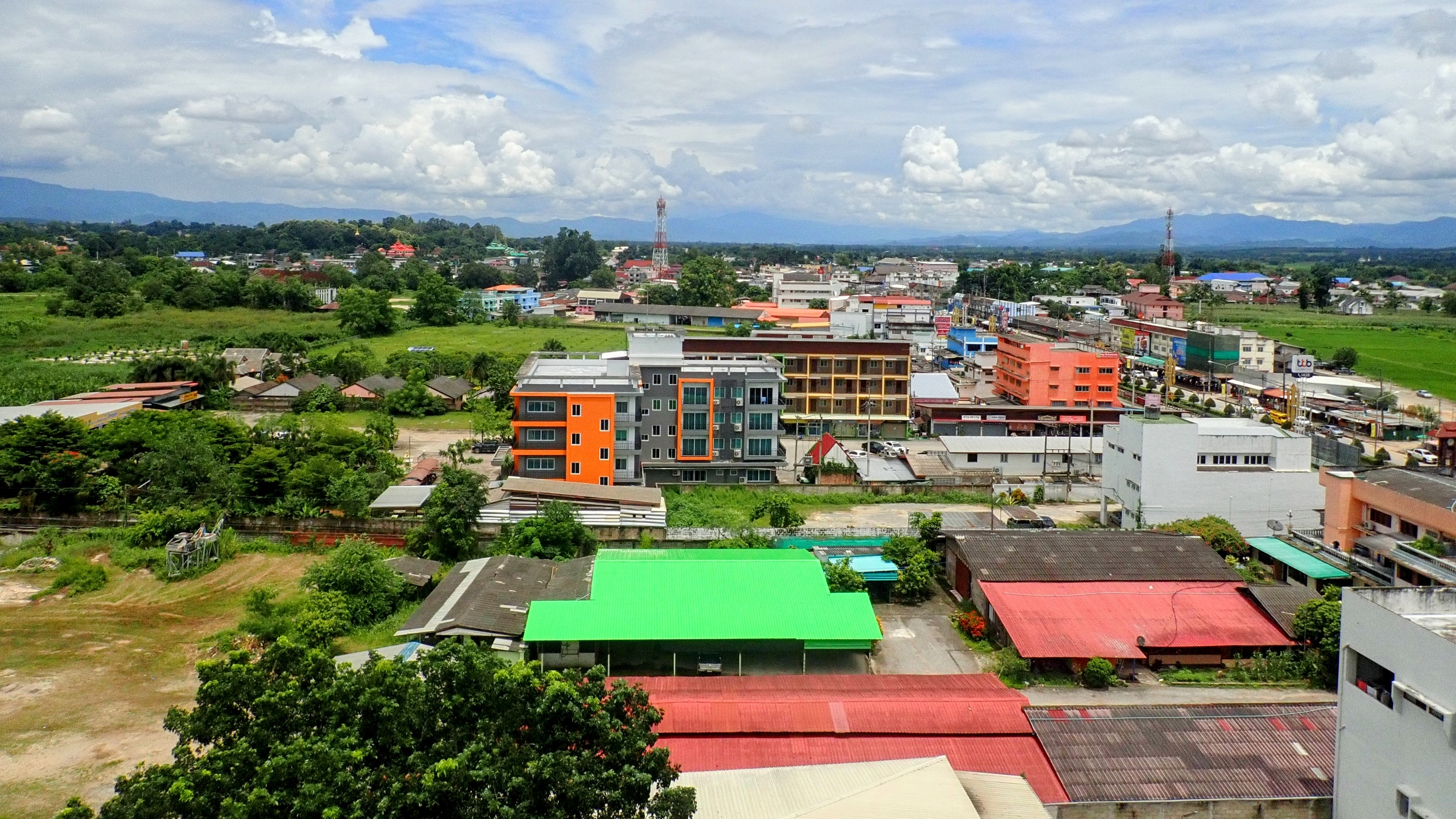
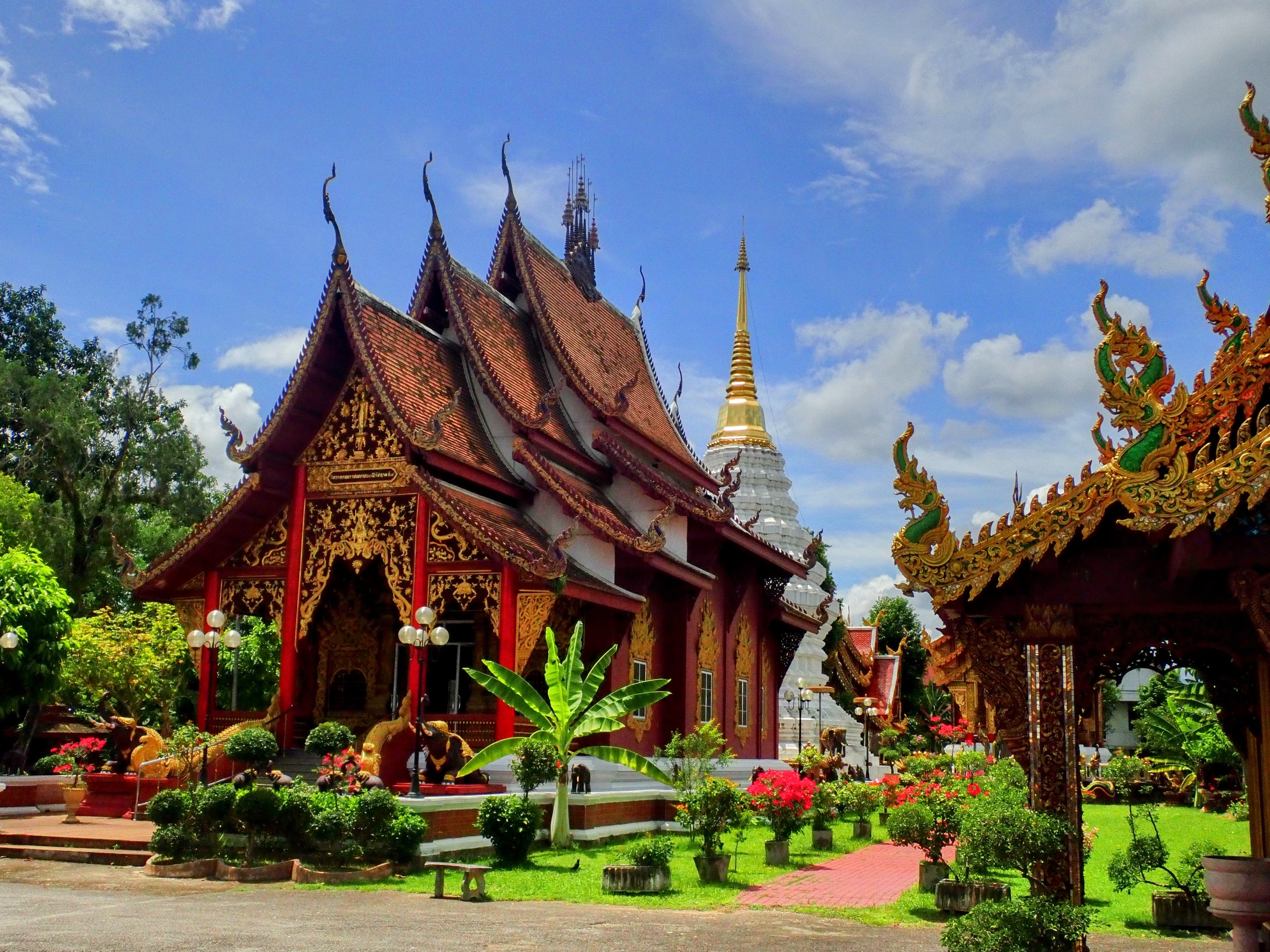
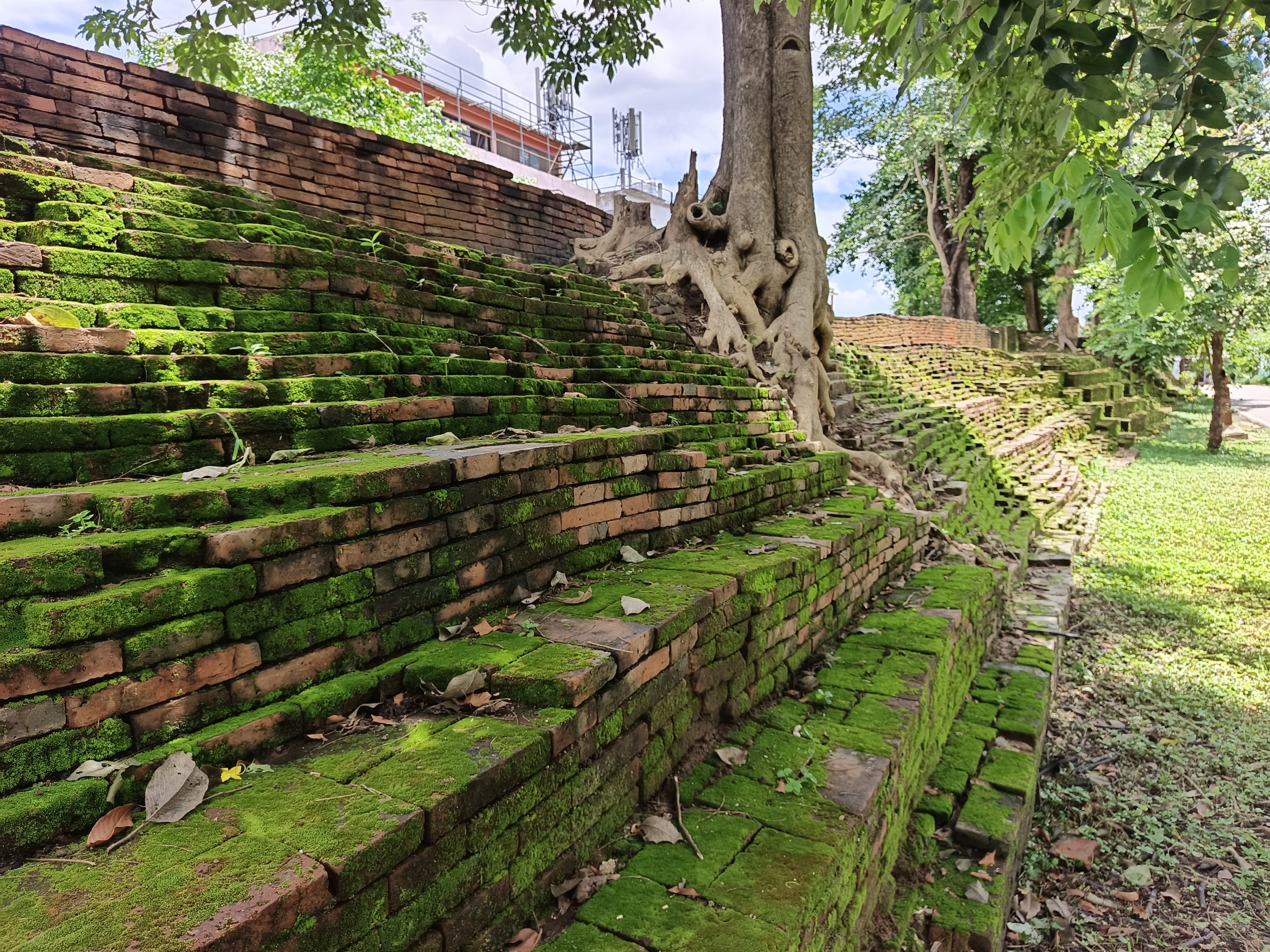
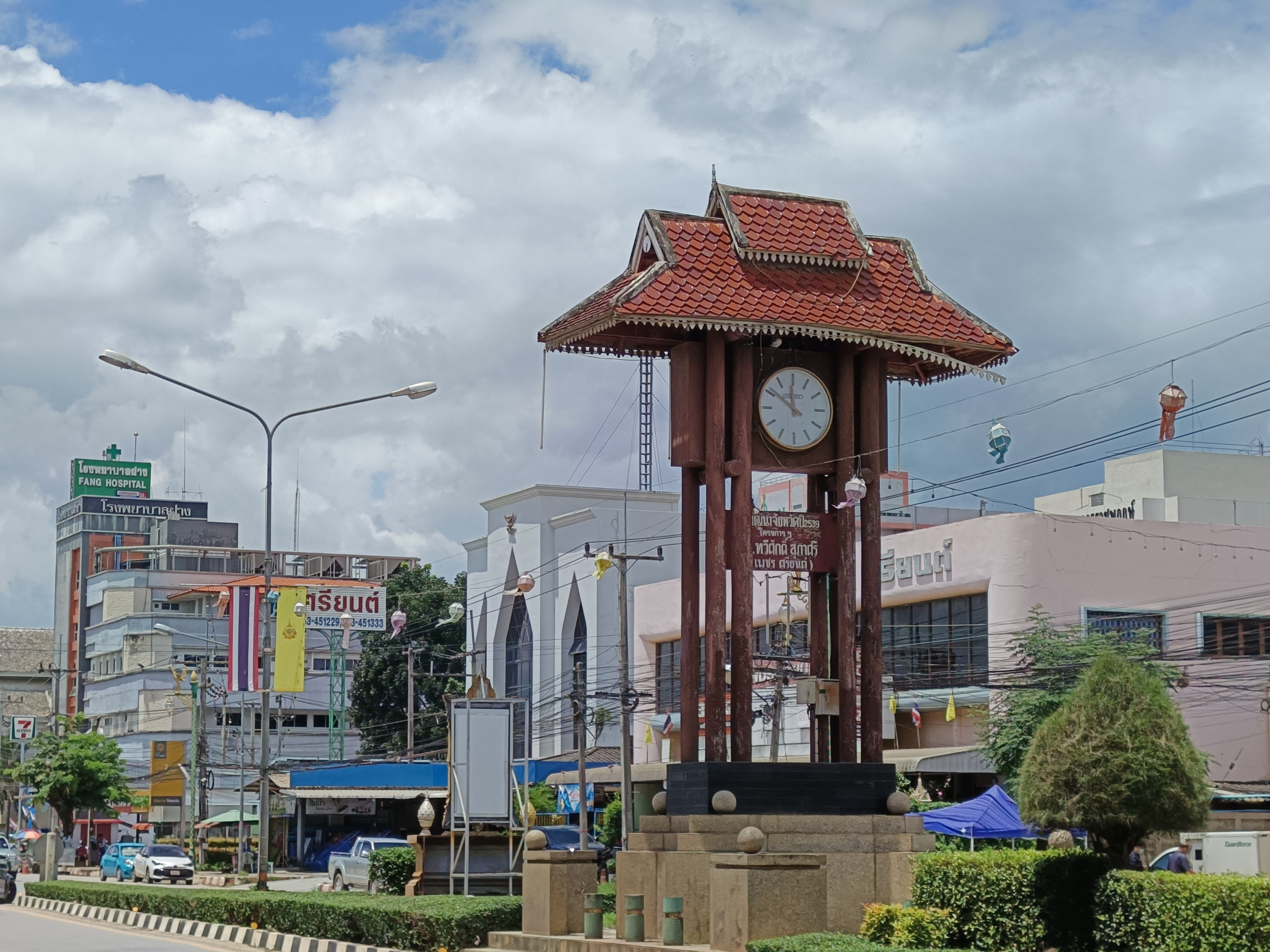
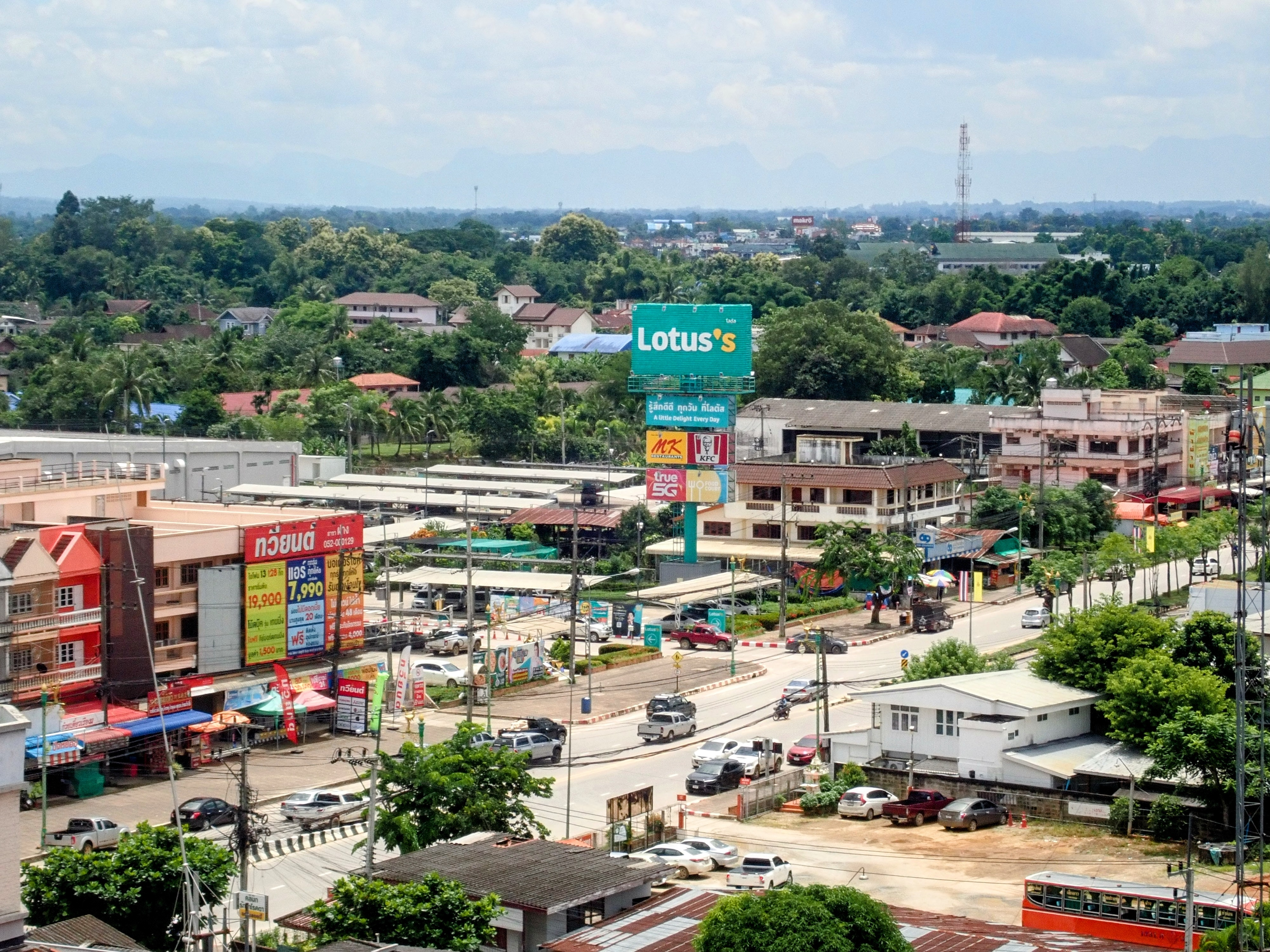
- Aerial view of Fang Wat Chedi Ngam Wall of Fang Fang clock tower Chiang Mai - Fang Rd.

- Location of the city within Thailand
- Coordinates: 19°55′8″N 99°12′49″E
- Country: Thailand
- Province: Chiang Mai Province

Government
  - Type: Subdistrict municipality

Area
  - Subdistrict Municipality: 2.714 km^{2} (1.048 sq mi)

Population (2009)
  - Subdistrict Municipality: 7,635
  - Density: 2,813/km^{2} (7,290/sq mi)
  - Metro: 24,851
  - Metro density: 89.29/km^{2} (231.3/sq mi)
- Time zone: UTC+7 (ICT)

Fang or "Wiang Fang" ("wiang" is a walled city or town) is a town in the northern Chiang Mai Province, Thailand, also known as Thesaban Wiang Fang, the capital of Fang District. It is 154 km north of Chiang Mai, among the highest mountains in the country.

== History ==
According to the Yonok chronicle, Mueang Fang was built in 641 by King Lawa Changkarat. Later King Mengrai the Great reigned in Fang before building Wiang Kum Kam and Chiang Mai of the Lanna Kingdom for one year around 1268. It seems that Mengrai used Mueang Fang for the base to invade Hariphunchai.

== Etymology ==
The landscape of Fang looked like the seed of a fang tree (Caesalpinia sappan). The town was named after the tree.

== Geography ==
Neighboring districts are (from the south clockwise) Mu 1, 10 Tambon San Sai, Mu 7 (Ban Mea Jai) Tambon Wiang, Mu 2, 4 Tambon Wiang, and Mu 2 Tambon Wiang.

== Administration ==
The town is subdivided into 12 boroughs ("chumchon"), which include five villages (muban) of the Wiang subdistrict - Mu 2, 3, 4, 5, and 9.

No.	Name	Thai name
1.	Ton Nun	ชุมชนต้นหนุน
2.	Pan Naram	ชุมชนปัณณาราม
3.	Chaeng Hua Rin	ชุมชนแจ่งหัวริน
4.	Phra Nang Sam Phio	ชุมชนพระนางสามผิว
5.	Suan Dok	ชุมชนสวนดอก
6.	Chedi Ngam	ชุมชนเจดีย์งาม
7.	Pa Bong	ชุมชนป่าบง
8.	Thep Amnuai	ชุมชนเทพอำนวย
9.	Ton Hang	ชุมชนต้นฮ่าง
10.	San Pa Nai	ชุมชนสันป่าไหน่
11.	Phai Lom	ชุมชนไผ่ล้อม
12.	Phai Tong	ชุมชนไผ่ทอง

== Education ==
The school structure is divided into four key stages: the first three years in elementary school, Prathom 1–3, are for ages 6–8; the second level, Prathom 4–6 are for children 9–11; the third level, Matthayom 1–3, is for ages 12–14. The upper secondary level of schooling consists of Matthayom 4–6 for ages 15–17 and is divided into academic and vocational streams. There are academic upper secondary schools, vocational upper secondary schools, and comprehensive schools offering academic and vocational tracks. Students who choose the academic stream usually intend to enter a university. Vocational schools offer programs that prepare students for employment.

=== Secondary school (Prathom 1 – Matthayom 3) ===
1. Ban Wiang Fang School (public)
2. Saiaksorn School (private)

=== High school (Prathom 1–Matthayom 6) ===
Rangsee Vittaya School (Christian school)

=== Technical college ===
Thana Technology International College Chiang Mai (private)

== Climate ==
Fang has a tropical wet and dry climate (Köppen climate classification Aw). Winters are fairly dry and warm. Temperatures rise until April, which is average around year at 25 °C (77 °F). The monsoon season runs from late-April through October, with heavy rain and somewhat cooler temperatures during the day, although nights remain warm.

Climate data for Fang (1991–2021; sunshine hours 1999–2019)
Month	Jan	Feb	Mar	Apr	May	Jun	Jul	Aug	Sep	Oct	Nov	Dec	Year
Mean daily maximum °C (°F)	26.1 (79.0)	30.1 (86.2)	33.1 (91.6)	34.3 (93.7)	31.1 (88.0)	29.6 (85.3)	28.5 (83.3)	28.0 (82.4)	27.9 (82.2)	27.4 (81.3)	26.5 (79.7)	25.0 (77.0)	29.0 (84.2)
Daily mean °C (°F)	20.3 (68.5)	23.2 (73.8)	26.1 (79.0)	27.8 (82.0)	26.0 (78.8)	25.2 (77.4)	24.5 (76.1)	24.2 (75.6)	24.0 (75.2)	23.3 (73.9)	21.8 (71.2)	19.7 (67.5)	23.8 (74.8)
Mean daily minimum °C (°F)	14.9 (58.8)	16.9 (62.4)	19.3 (66.7)	21.8 (71.2)	22.1 (71.8)	22.2 (72.0)	21.8 (71.2)	21.5 (70.7)	21.2 (70.2)	20.0 (68.0)	17.5 (63.5)	14.8 (58.6)	19.5 (67.1)
Average precipitation mm (inches)	18 (0.7)	7 (0.3)	18 (0.7)	44 (1.7)	140 (5.5)	148 (5.8)	254 (10.0)	269 (10.6)	217 (8.5)	107 (4.2)	38 (1.5)	19 (0.7)	1,279 (50.4)
Average precipitation days (≥ 1.0 mm)	2	2	2	6	14	16	19	20	17	14	4	2	118
Average relative humidity (%)	67	52	46	52	74	82	86	89	89	86	78	74	72.9
Mean daily sunshine hours	8.0	10.0	10.0	10.0	9.0	9.0	8.0	7.0	7.0	6.0	7.0	7.0	8.2
Source 1: Climate-Data.org (1991–2021)
Source 2: Climate-Data.org (sunshine hours, 1999–2019)

== See also ==
- Fang District
- Fangchanupathum School
- Chai Prakan
