= San Sai, Fang =

San Sai สันทราย
- Tambon
- Country: Thailand
- Province: Chiang Mai
- District: Fang

Population (2005)
  - Total: 11,583
- Time zone: UTC+7 (ICT)

San Sai (Thai: สันทราย) is a tambon (subdistrict) of Fang District, in Chiang Mai Province, Thailand. In 2005 it had a population of 11,583 people. The tambon contains 17 villages. The subdistrict is the home of Fangchanupathum School.
