= Fangchanupathum School =

Coordinates: 19.8645°N 99.1775°E

- Ban Song Kwae, San Sai, Fang District, Chiang Mai; Thailand

Information
- Type: Public
- Motto: Good Study, Good Sport, Discipline, Kindness
- Established: 1961
- Faculty: ~60
- Grades: 7–12
- Enrollment: ~1,500
- Campus size: ~30 acres
- Colors: Blue and Pink
- Website: http://www.fangchanu.ac.th/

Fangchanupathum School (Thai: โรงเรียนฝางชนูปถัมภ์) is a public school in Fang District, Chiang Mai Province, Thailand. Fangchanupathum School is a large, public secondary school located outside of Chiang Mai city center in the Fang district.

== Additional Information ==
- Fangchanupathum School is the district school for Fang and the only public school in the district offering secondary education from Mathayom 1 to Mathayom 6.

== History ==
Fangchanupathum School was approved by the Department of General Education and began secondary level teaching in 1961. The school is in Ban Song Kwae, 7 km from Fang. People from tambon San Sai and Mae Sun built a one-storey building. The first class had 34 students and three teachers. Mr. Damrong Wiwatnaphon was the first principal in 1966.

== School system ==
=== Mathayom Ton ===
At Mathayom Ton levels (grades 7–9), students follow eight core subjects each semester: Thai language, mathematics, science, social science, health and physical education, arts and music, technology, and foreign languages.

=== Mathayom Pai ===
At Mathayom Pai levels (grades 10–12), students are allowed to choose one or two elective courses. The science programme (Wit-Kanit) and the mathematics-English language programme (Sil-Kamnuan) are among the most popular. Foreign language programmes (Sil-Phasa) include (Chinese and English).

== Departments ==
1. Course Development
2. Register
3. Learning Skills
4. Library
5. Quality inspection
6. Guidance

=== Learning skills ===
1. Thai language
2. Foreign language
3. Social studies
4. Mathematics
5. Sciences
6. Health
7. Occupations and Technology
8. Arts
