= Mae Thalop =

Mae Thalop แม่ทะลบ
- Tambon
- Interactive map of Mae Thalop
- Coordinates: 19°43′N 99°11′E
- Country: Thailand
- Province: Chiang Mai
- Amphoe: Chai Prakan

Population (2020)
  - Total: 7,930
- Time zone: UTC+7 (TST)
- Postal code: 50320
- TIS 1099: 502103

Mae Thalop (Thai: แม่ทะลบ) is a tambon (subdistrict) of Chai Prakan District, in Chiang Mai Province, Thailand. In 2020 it had a total population of 7,930 people.

== History ==
The subdistrict was created effective 1 April 1982 by splitting off 4 administrative villages from Pong Tam.

== Administration ==
=== Central administration ===
The tambon is subdivided into 7 administrative villages (muban).

No.	Name	Thai
1.	Ban Mae Thalop	บ้านแม่ทะลบ
2.	Ban Pa Daeng	บ้านป่าแดง
3.	Ban Pa Ngio	บ้านป่างิ้ว
4.	Ban Doi Lo	บ้านดอยหล่อ
5.	Ban Dong	บ้านดง
6.	Ban Mai Phatthana	บ้านใหม่พัฒนา
7.	Ban Huai Ton Tong	บ้านห้วยต้นตอง

=== Local administration ===
The whole area of the subdistrict is covered by the subdistrict administrative organization (SAO) Mae Thalop (องค์การบริหารส่วนตำบลแม่ทะลบ).
