= Mae Sun =

Coordinates: 19.8305°N 99.1706°E

Mae Sun แม่สูน
- Tambon
- Interactive map of Mae Sun
- Country: Thailand
- Province: Chiang Mai
- District: Fang

Population (2005)
  - Total: 15,019
- Time zone: UTC+7 (ICT)

Mae Sun (Thai: แม่สูน) is a tambon or subdistrict of Fang District, in Chiang Mai Province, Thailand. It falls within the country’s time zone of UTC+7 (ICT). In 2005 it had a population of 15,019 people. Mae Sun is a part of the Tambon administrative division.
