= Si Dong Yen =

Si Dong Yen ศรีดงเย็น
- Tambon
- Interactive map of Si Dong Yen
- Coordinates: 19°39′05″N 99°08′46″E
- Country: Thailand
- Province: Chiang Mai
- Amphoe: Chai Prakan

Population (2020)
  - Total: 17,553
- Time zone: UTC+7 (TST)
- Postal code: 50320
- TIS 1099: 502102

Si Dong Yen (Thai: ศรีดงเย็น) is a tambon (subdistrict) of Chai Prakan District, in Chiang Mai Province, Thailand. In 2020 it had a total population of 17,553 people.

== History ==
The subdistrict was created effective 14 September 1976 by splitting off 8 administrative villages from Pong Tam.

== Administration ==
=== Central administration ===
The tambon is subdivided into 18 administrative villages (muban).

No.	Name	Thai
1.	Ban Mae Khi	บ้านแม่ขิ
2.	Ban Mae Khi Lai Fang	บ้านแม่ขิหล่ายฝาง
3.	Ban Si Dong Yen	บ้านศรีดงเย็น
4.	Ban Intharam	บ้านอินทราราม
5.	Ban Ai	บ้านอ่าย
6.	Ban Rong Than	บ้านร้องธาร
7.	Ban Sai Khao	บ้านทรายขาว
8.	Ban Nong Pa Sang	บ้านหนองป่าซาง
9.	Ban Dong Pa Sak	บ้านดงป่าสัก
10.	Ban Hua Fai	บ้านหัวฝาย
11.	Ban Kio Champi	บ้านกิ่วจำปี
12.	Ban San Sai	บ้านสันทราย
13.	Ban Tham Nong Bia	บ้านถ้ำหนองเบี้ย
14.	Ban Pang Makham Pom	บ้านปางมะขามป้อม
15.	Ban Chiang Man	บ้านเชียงหมั้น
16.	Ban Phae	บ้านแพะ
17.	Ban Dong	บ้านด้ง
18.	Ban Wiang Pha Phatthana	บ้านเวียงผาพัฒนา

=== Local administration ===
The area of the subdistrict is shared by 2 local governments.

- the subdistrict municipality (Thesaban Tambon) Chai Prakan (เทศบาลตำบลไชยปราการ)
- the subdistrict administrative organization (SAO) Si Dong Yen (องค์การบริหารส่วนตำบลศรีดงเย็น)
