= Mon Pin =

Coordinates: 19.9168°N 99.1583°E

Mon Pin ม่อนปิ่น
- Tambon
- Interactive map of Mon Pin
- Country: Thailand
- Province: Chiang Mai
- District: Fang

Population (2005)
  - Total: 19,123
- Time zone: UTC+7 (ICT)

Mon Pin (Thai: ม่อนปิ่น) is a tambon (subdistrict) of Fang District, in Chiang Mai Province, Thailand. In 2005 it had a population of 19,123 people. The tambon contains 22 villages.
