= Pong Nam Ron, Chiang Mai =

Pong Nam Ron โป่งน้ำร้อน
- Tambon
- Country: Thailand
- Province: Chiang Mai
- District: Fang

Area
  - Total: 110.50 km^{2} (42.66 sq mi)

Population (2009)
  - Total: 5,687
- Time zone: UTC+7 (ICT)
- Postal code: 50110
- Geocode: 500912
- Website: www.pongnamron.org

Pong Nam Ron (Thai: โป่งน้ำร้อน) is a tambon (subdistrict) of Fang District, in Chiang Mai Province, Thailand. In 2009 it had a population of 5687 people. The tambon contains seven villages.
