= Mae Kha Subdistrict (50091000) =

Coordinates: 19.8361°N 99.2168°E

Mae Kha แม่คะ
- Tambon
- Interactive map of Mae Kha
- Country: Thailand
- Province: Chiang Mai
- District: Fang

Population (2005)
  - Total: 14,542
- Time zone: UTC+7 (ICT)

Mae Kha (Thai: แม่คะ) is a tambon (subdistrict) of Fang District, in Chiang Mai Province, Thailand. In 2005, it had a population of 14,542 people. The tambon contains 15 villages.
