= Nong Bua, Chiang Mai =

Nong Bua หนองบัว
- Tambon
- Interactive map of Nong Bua
- Coordinates: 19°44′N 99°04′E
- Country: Thailand
- Province: Chiang Mai
- Amphoe: Chai Prakan

Population (2020)
  - Total: 16,861
- Time zone: UTC+7 (TST)
- Postal code: 50320
- TIS 1099: 502104

Nong Bua (Thai: หนองบัว) is a tambon (subdistrict) of Chai Prakan District, in Chiang Mai Province, Thailand. In 2020 it had a total population of 16,861 people.

== History ==
The subdistrict was created effective September 1, 1985 by splitting off 8 administrative villages from Pong Tam.

== Administration ==
=== Central administration ===
The tambon is subdivided into 11 administrative villages (muban).

No.	Name	Thai
1.	Ban Den	บ้านเด่น
2.	Ban Huai Phai	บ้านห้วยไผ่
3.	Ban Nong Bua	บ้านหนองบัว
4.	Ban Tha	บ้านทา
5.	Ban Ton Chok	บ้านต้นโชค
6.	Ban Tham Ngop	บ้านถ้ำง๊อบ
7.	Ban Pong	บ้านปง
8.	Ban Pang	บ้านปาง
9.	Ban Pa Mai Daeng	บ้านป่าไม้แดง
10.	Ban Mai Nong Bua	บ้านใหม่หนองบัว
11.	Ban Tham Pha Phueng	บ้านถ้ำผาผึ้ง

== Local government ==
The area of the subdistrict is shared by 2 local governments:

- the subdistrict municipality (Thesaban Tambon) Chai Prakan (เทศบาลตำบลไชยปราการ)
- the subdistrict municipality (Thesaban Tambon) Nong Bua Subdistrict Municipality (เทศบาลตำบลหนองบัว)

Nong Bua Subdistrict Municipality is a local government municipality in Chai Prakan district, Chiang Mai province, Thailand. The municipality is responsible for local administration and public services within its jurisdiction.

=== History ===
Nong Bua Subdistrict Municipality was originally administered as a Subdistrict Council. It was upgraded to Nong Bua Subdistrict Administrative Organization on 16 December 1996, and subsequently elevated to subdistrict municipality status on 27 October 2009.

=== Administration ===
Nong Bua Subdistrict Municipality is governed by a municipal council and a mayor, in accordance with Thailand's local government system.

The municipality covers an area of approximately 83.33 square kilometres (32.17 sq mi), or 52,081 rai. Its jurisdiction includes eight villages in their entirety:

- Moo 4 Ban Tha
- Moo 5 Ban Ton Chok
- Moo 6 Ban Tham Ngop
- Moo 7 Ban Pong
- Moo 8 Ban Pang
- Moo 9 Ban Pa Mai Daeng
- Moo 10 Ban Mai Nong Bua
- Moo 11 Ban Tham Pha Phueng

Parts of Moo 1 Ban Den and Moo 3 Ban Nong Bua are also within the municipality's jurisdiction.

== See also ==
- Chai Prakan District
- Chai Prakan
