= Fang district =

Fang ฝาง
- District
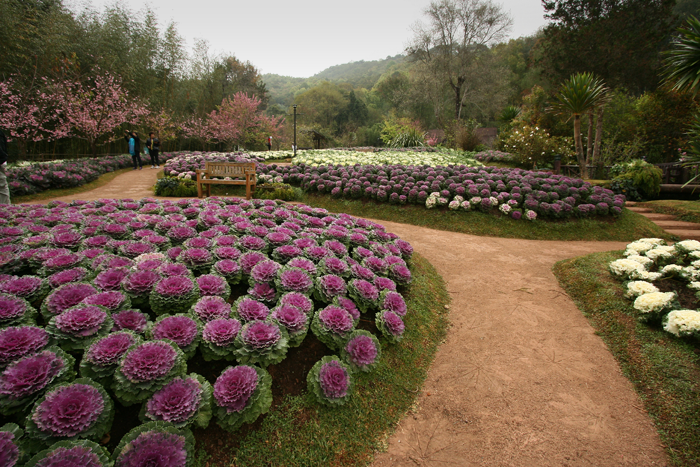
- Royal Agricultural Station at Doi Ang Khang

- District location in Chiang Mai province
- Coordinates: 19°55′8″N 99°12′49″E
- Country: Thailand
- Province: Chiang Mai
- Seat: Fang (town)

Area
  - Total: 888.164 km^{2} (342.922 sq mi)

Population (2005)
  - Total: 231,544
  - Density: 931.6/km^{2} (2,413/sq mi)
- Time zone: UTC+7 (ICT)
- Postal code: 50110
- Geocode: 5009

Fang (Thai: ฝาง, pronounced [fǎːŋ]) is a district (amphoe) in the northern part of Chiang Mai province, northern Thailand.

== History ==
According to the Yonok chronicle, Mueang Fang was built in 641 by King Lawa Changkarat. Later, King Mengrai the Great ruled over Fang before building Wiang Kumkam and Chiang Mai as successive capitals of the Lanna Kingdom, beginning in 1294. Prior to the new capitals, Mengrai had used Mueang Fang as a base to invade Hariphunchai.

In 1910, Mueang Fang was made part of Chiang Rai province, and named Mueang Fang District. In 1925, it was reassigned to Chiang Mai Province. In 1938, the word mueang was dropped from Fang's name, which was then reserved for capital districts of provinces.

== Etymology ==
The landscape of Mueang Fang looked like the seed of a fang tree (Caesalpinia sappan). The town was named after this tree.

== Geography ==
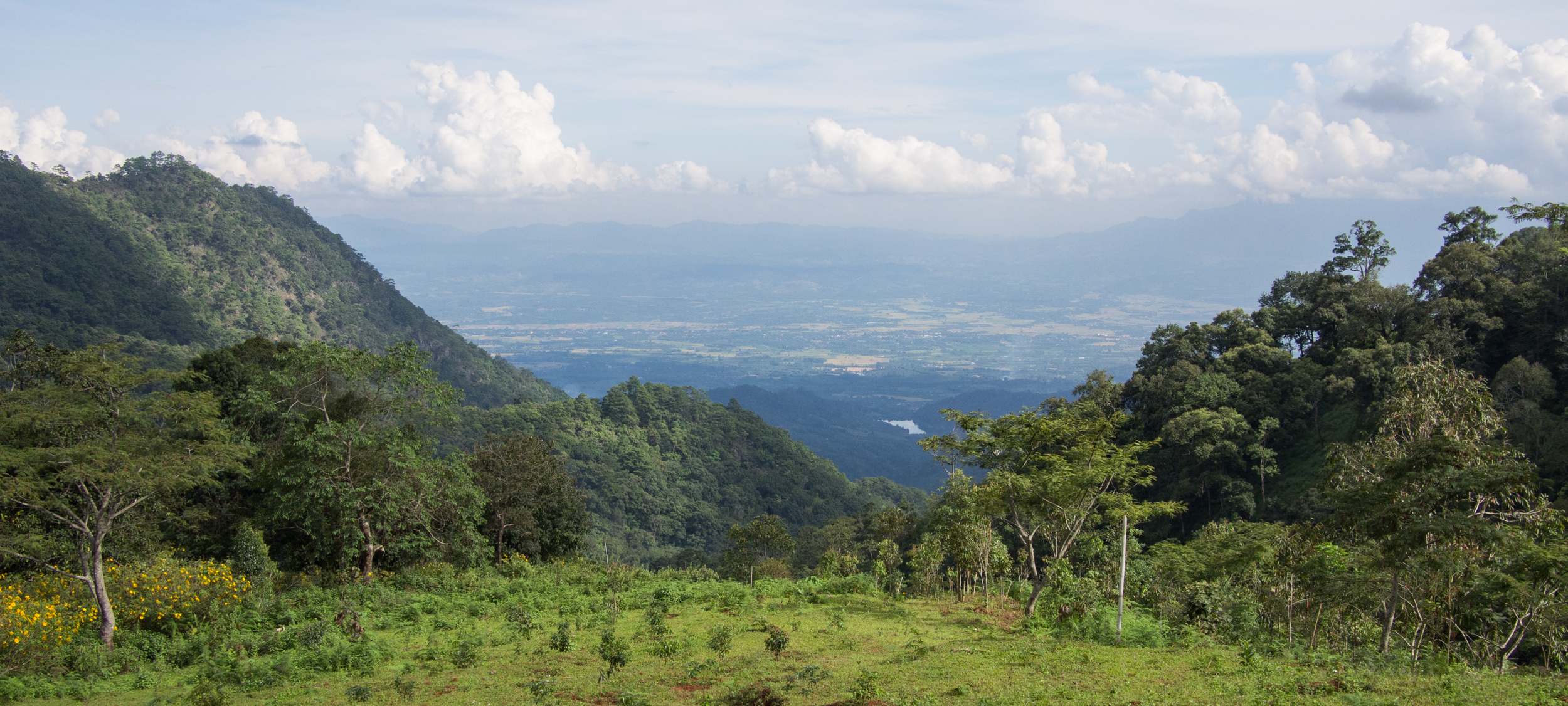
View from Rte 1340, Daen Lao Range, Fang Valley

Neighboring districts are (from the northeast, clockwise) Mae Ai of Chiang Mai Province, Mae Suai of Chiang Rai province, Chai Prakan of Chiang Mai Province, and Shan State of Myanmar. The Fang River, a tributary of the Kok River, gives its name to the district.

Doi Pha Hom Pok National Park is in Fang District. The Daen Lao Range runs through the district's north and west, and the Khun Tan Range begins in the south of the district.

== Administration ==
The district is divided into eight subdistricts (tambons), which are further subdivided into 128 villages (mubans). There are two townships (thesaban tambons): Wiang Fang covers parts of tambon Wiang, and Ban Mae Kha parts of tambon Mae Kha. There are a further eight tambon administrative organizations (TAO).

No.	Name	Thai name	Villages	Pop.
1.	Wiang	เวียง	19	26,810
3.	Mon Pin	ม่อนปิ่น	22	19,123
4.	Mae Ngon	แม่งอน	18	17,715
5.	Mae Sun	แม่สูน	17	15,019
6.	San Sai	สันทราย	17	11,583
10.	Mae Kha	แม่คะ	15	14,542
11.	Mae Kha	แม่ข่า	13	9,873
12.	Pong Nam Ron	โป่งน้ำร้อน	7	6,368

Missing numbers are tambons which now form Chai Prakan district.

== See also ==
- Fangchanupathum School
- Fang (town)
