= List of tambon in Thailand (S) =

This is a list of tambon (sub-districts) in Thailand, beginning with the letter S. This information is liable to change due to border changes or re-allocation of tambons. Missing Tambon numbers show where the number is either not used or the tambon has been transferred to a different district (amphoe).

Tambon (sub-district)	ตำบล	Amphoe (district)	อำเภอ	Changwat (province)	จังหวัด	Region
Sa	สระ	Chiang Muan	เชียงม่วน	Phayao	พะเยา	North
Sa Bot	สระโบสถ์	Sa Bot	สระโบสถ์	Lopburi	ลพบุรี	Central
Sa Bua	สระบัว	Khaen Dong	แคนดง	Buriram	บุรีรัมย์	North-East
Sa Bua	สระบัว	Pathum Rat	ปทุมรัตต์	Roi Et	ร้อยเอ็ด	North-East
Sa Chaeng	สระแจง	Bang Rachan	บางระจัน	Sing Buri	สิงห์บุรี	Central
Sa Chorakhe	สระจรเข้	Dan Khun Thot	ด่านขุนทด	Nakhon Ratchasima	นครราชสีมา	North-East
Sa Kaeo	สระแก้ว	Nong Hong	หนองหงส์	Buriram	บุรีรัมย์	North-East
Sa Kaeo	สระแก้ว	Mueang Sa Kaeo	เมืองสระแก้ว	Sa Kaeo	สระแก้ว	East
Sa Kaeo	สระแก้ว	Mueang Suphanburi	เมืองสุพรรณบุรี	Suphan Buri	สุพรรณบุรี	Central
Sa Kaeo	สระแก้ว	Phanom Phrai	พนมไพร	Roi Et	ร้อยเอ็ด	North-East
Sa Kaeo	สระแก้ว	Lat Yao	ลาดยาว	Nakhon Sawan	นครสวรรค์	Central
Sa Kaeo	สระแก้ว	Mueang Kamphaeng Phet	เมืองกำแพงเพชร	Kamphaeng Phet	กำแพงเพชร	Central
Sa Kaeo	สระแก้ว	Pueai Noi	เปือยน้อย	Khon Kaen	ขอนแก่น	North-East
Sa Kaeo	สระแก้ว	Tha Sala	ท่าศาลา	Nakhon Si Thammarat	นครศรีธรรมราช	South
Sa Kaeo	สระแก้ว	Bueng Sam Phan	บึงสามพัน	Phetchabun	เพชรบูรณ์	Central
Sa Kamphaeng Yai	สระกำแพงใหญ่	Uthumphon Phisai	อุทุมพรพิสัย	Sisaket	ศรีสะเกษ	North-East
Sa Kathiam	สระกะเทียม	Mueang Nakhon Pathom	เมืองนครปฐม	Nakhon Phanom	นครพนม	North-East
Sa Khu	สระคู	Suwannaphum	สุวรรณภูมิ	Roi Et	ร้อยเอ็ด	North-East
Sa Khut	สระขุด	Chumphon Buri	ชุมพลบุรี	Surin	สุรินทร์	North-East
Sa Khwan	สระขวัญ	Mueang Sa Kaeo	เมืองสระแก้ว	Sa Kaeo	สระแก้ว	East
Sako	สากอ	Su-ngai Padi (Malay: Sungai Padi)	สุไหงปาดี	Narathiwat	นราธิวาส	South
Sa Krachom	สระกระโจม	Don Chedi	ดอนเจดีย์	Suphan Buri	สุพรรณบุรี	Central
Sa Kruat	สระกรวด	Si Thep	ศรีเทพ	Phetchabun	เพชรบูรณ์	Central
Sa Long Ruea	สระลงเรือ	Huai Krachao	ห้วยกระเจา	Kanchanaburi	กาญจนบุรี	West
Sa Nok Kaeo	สระนกแก้ว	Phon Thong	โพนทอง	Roi Et	ร้อยเอ็ด	North-East
Sa Phang	สระพัง	Khao Yoi	เขาย้อย	Phetchaburi	เพชรบุรี	West
Sa Phang	สระพัง	Ban Thaen	บ้านแท่น	Chaiyaphum	ชัยภูมิ	North-East
Sa Phang Lan	สระพังลาน	U Thong	อู่ทอง	Suphan Buri	สุพรรณบุรี	Central
Sa Phatthana	สระพัฒนา	Kamphaeng Saen	กำแพงแสน	Nakhon Pathom	นครปฐม	Central
Sa Phon Thong	สระโพนทอง	Kaset Sombun	เกษตรสมบูรณ์	Chaiyaphum	ชัยภูมิ	North-East
Sa Phra	สระพระ	Phra Thong Kham	พระทองคำ	Nakhon Ratchasima	นครราชสีมา	North-East
Sa Pradu	สระประดู่	Wichian Buri	วิเชียรบุรี	Phetchabun	เพชรบูรณ์	Central
Sa Saming	สระสมิง	Warin Chamrap	วารินชำราบ	Ubon Ratchathani	อุบลราชธานี	North-East
Sa Si Liam	สระสี่เหลี่ยม	Phanat Nikhom	พนัสนิคม	Chonburi	ชลบุรี	East
Sa Si Mum	สระสี่มุม	Kamphaeng Saen	กำแพงแสน	Nakhon Pathom	นครปฐม	Central
Sa Takhian	สระตะเคียน	Soeng Sang	เสิงสาง	Nakhon Ratchasima	นครราชสีมา	North-East
Sa Thale	สระทะเล	Phayuha Khiri	พยุหะคีรี	Nakhon Sawan	นครสวรรค์	Central
Sa Thong	สระทอง	Nong Hong	หนองหงส์	Buriram	บุรีรัมย์	North-East
Sa Wan Phraya	สระว่านพระยา	Khon Buri	ครบุรี	Nakhon Ratchasima	นครราชสีมา	North-East
Sa Yai Som	สระยายโสม	U Thong	อู่ทอง	Suphan Buri	สุพรรณบุรี	Central
Sa Yao	สระเยาว์	Si Rattana	ศรีรัตนะ	Sisaket	ศรีสะเกษ	North-East
Sa-e	สะเอะ	Krong Pinang (Malay: Kampung Pinang)	กรงปินัง	Yala	ยะลา	South
Sa-at Chai Si	สะอาดไชยศรี	Don Chan	ดอนจาน	Kalasin	กาฬสินธุ์	North-East
Sa-at Sombun	สะอาดสมบูรณ์	Mueang Roi Et	เมืองร้อยเอ็ด	Roi Et	ร้อยเอ็ด	North-East
Sa-at	สะอาด	Pho Chai	โพธิ์ชัย	Roi Et	ร้อยเอ็ด	North-East
Sa-at	สะอาด	Nam Phong	น้ำพอง	Khon Kaen	ขอนแก่น	North-East
Sa-iap	สะเอียบ	Song	สอง	Phrae	แพร่	North
Sa-nga Ban	สง่าบ้าน	Doi Saket	ดอยสะเก็ด	Chiang Mai	เชียงใหม่	North
Sap Champha	ซับจำปา	Tha Luang	ท่าหลวง	Lopburi	ลพบุรี	Central
Sap Sombun	ซับสมบูรณ์	Lam Sonthi	ลำสนธิ	Lopburi	ลพบุรี	Central
Saba Yoi	สะบ้าย้อย	Saba Yoi (Malay: Sebayu)	สะบ้าย้อย	Songkhla	สงขลา	South
Sabaeng	สะแบง	Nong Han	หนองหาน	Udon Thani	อุดรธานี	North-East
Saban	สาบัน	Yaring (Malay: Jamu)	ยะหริ่ง	Pattani	ปัตตานี	South
Sabarang	สะบารัง	Mueang Pattani (Malay: Patani)	เมืองปัตตานี	Pattani	ปัตตานี	South
Sadao	สะเดา	Sadao (Malay: Sendawa)	สะเดา	Songkhla	สงขลา	South
Sadao	สะเดา	Buachet	บัวเชด	Surin	สุรินทร์	North-East
Sadao	สะเดา	Nang Rong	นางรอง	Buriram	บุรีรัมย์	North-East
Sadao	สะเดา	Phlapphla Chai	พลับพลาชัย	Buriram	บุรีรัมย์	North-East
Sadao Yai	สะเดาใหญ่	Khukhan	ขุขันธ์	Sisaket	ศรีสะเกษ	North-East
Sadawa	สะดาวา	Yarang	ยะรัง	Pattani	ปัตตานี	South
Sadiang	สะเดียง	Mueang Phetchabun	เมืองเพชรบูรณ์	Phetchabun	เพชรบูรณ์	Central
Sado Phong	สะเดาะพง	Khao Kho	เขาค้อ	Phetchabun	เพชรบูรณ์	Central
Sae-o	แซร์ออ	Watthana Nakhon	วัฒนานคร	Sa Kaeo	สระแก้ว	East
Saen Chat	แสนชาติ	Changhan	จังหาร	Roi Et	ร้อยเอ็ด	North-East
Saen Hai	แสนไห	Wiang Haeng	เวียงแหง	Chiang Mai	เชียงใหม่	North
Saen Phan	แสนพัน	That Phanom	ธาตุพนม	Nakhon Phanom	นครพนม	North-East
Saen Phu Dat	แสนภูดาษ	Ban Pho	บ้านโพธิ์	Chachoengsao	ฉะเชิงเทรา	East
Saen Saep	แสนแสบ	Khet Min Buri	มีนบุรี	Bangkok	กรุงเทพมหานคร	Central
Saen Suk	แสนสุข	Warin Chamrap	วารินชำราบ	Ubon Ratchathani	อุบลราชธานี	North-East
Saen Suk	แสนสุข	Phanom Phrai	พนมไพร	Roi Et	ร้อยเอ็ด	North-East
Saen Suk	แสนสุข	Mueang Chonburi	เมืองชลบุรี	Chonburi	ชลบุรี	East
Saen Thong	แสนทอง	Tha Wang Pha	ท่าวังผา	Nan	น่าน	North
Saen To	แสนตอ	Nam Pat	น้ำปาด	Uttaradit	อุตรดิตถ์	North
Saen To	แสนตอ	Tha Maka	ท่ามะกา	Kanchanaburi	กาญจนบุรี	West
Saen To	แสนตอ	Mueang Uttaradit	เมืองอุตรดิตถ์	Uttaradit	อุตรดิตถ์	North
Saen To	แสนตอ	Khanu Woralaksaburi	ขาณุวรลักษบุรี	Kamphaeng Phet	กำแพงเพชร	Central
Saen Tung	แสนตุ้ง	Khao Saming	เขาสมิง	Trat	ตราด	East
Saeng Arun	แสงอรุณ	Thap Sakae	ทับสะแก	Prachuap Khiri Khan	ประจวบคีรีขันธ์	West
Saeng Badan	แซงบาดาล	Somdet	สมเด็จ	Kalasin	กาฬสินธุ์	North-East
Saeng Pha	แสงภา	Na Haeo	นาแห้ว	Loei	เลย	North-East
Saeng Sawang	แสงสว่าง	Nong Saeng	หนองแสง	Udon Thani	อุดรธานี	North-East
Sahakon Nikhom	สหกรณ์นิคม	Thong Pha Phum	ทองผาภูมิ	Kanchanaburi	กาญจนบุรี	West
Sahathat	สหธาตุ	Khueang Nai	เขื่องใน	Ubon Ratchathani	อุบลราชธานี	North-East
Sahatsakhan	สหัสขันธ์	Sahatsakhan	สหัสขันธ์	Kalasin	กาฬสินธุ์	North-East
Sai Daeng	ทรายแดง	Mueang Ranong	เมืองระนอง	Ranong	ระนอง	South
Sai Diao	ไทรเดี่ยว	Khlong Hat	คลองหาด	Sa Kaeo	สระแก้ว	East
Sai Huai Kaeo	สายห้วยแก้ว	Ban Mi	บ้านหมี่	Lopburi	ลพบุรี	Central
Sai Kham Ho	สายคำโห้	Mueang Phichit	เมืองพิจิตร	Phichit	พิจิตร	Central
Sai Khao	ทรายขาว	Phan	พาน	Chiang Rai	เชียงราย	North
Sai Khao	ทรายขาว	Wang Saphung	วังสะพุง	Loei	เลย	North-East
Sai Khao	ทรายขาว	Hua Sai	หัวไทร	Nakhon Si Thammarat	นครศรีธรรมราช	South
Sai Khao	ทรายขาว	Soi Dao	สอยดาว	Chanthaburi	จันทบุรี	East
Sai Khao	ทรายขาว	Khlong Thom	คลองท่อม	Krabi	กระบี่	South
Sai Khao	ทรายขาว	Khok Pho	โคกโพธิ์	Pattani	ปัตตานี	South
Sai Khueng	ไทรขึง	Phrasaeng	พระแสง	Surat Thani	สุราษฎร์ธานี	South
Sai Kong Din	ทรายกองดิน	Khet Khlong Sam Wa	คลองสามวา	Bangkok	กรุงเทพมหานคร	Central
Sai Kong Din Tai	ทรายกองดินใต้	Khet Khlong Sam Wa	คลองสามวา	Bangkok	กรุงเทพมหานคร	Central
Sai Ma	ไทรม้า	Mueang Nonthaburi	เมืองนนทบุรี	Nonthaburi	นนทบุรี	Central
Sai Mai	สายไหม	Khet Sai Mai	สายไหม	Bangkok	กรุงเทพมหานคร	Central
Sai Mak	ไสหมาก	Chian Yai	เชียรใหญ่	Nakhon Si Thammarat	นครศรีธรรมราช	South
Sai Mun	ทรายมูล	San Kamphaeng	สันกำแพง	Chiang Mai	เชียงใหม่	North
Sai Mun	ทรายมูล	Sawang Daen Din	สว่างแดนดิน	Sakon Nakhon	สกลนคร	North-East
Sai Mun	ทรายมูล	Phibun Mangsahan	พิบูลมังสาหาร	Ubon Ratchathani	อุบลราชธานี	North-East
Sai Mun	ทรายมูล	Ongkharak	องครักษ์	Nakhon Nayok	นครนายก	Central
Sai Mun	ทรายมูล	Nam Phong	น้ำพอง	Khon Kaen	ขอนแก่น	North-East
Sai Na Wang	สายนาวัง	Na Khu	นาคู	Kalasin	กาฬสินธุ์	North-East
Sai Ngam	ไทรงาม	Sai Ngam	ไทรงาม	Kamphaeng Phet	กำแพงเพชร	Central
Sai Ngam	ไทรงาม	Bang Len	บางเลน	Nakhon Pathom	นครปฐม	Central
Sai Noi	ไทรน้อย	Sai Noi	ไทรน้อย	Nonthaburi	นนทบุรี	Central
Sai Noi	ไทรน้อย	Bang Ban	บางบาล	Phra Nakhon Si Ayutthaya	พระนครศรีอยุธยา	Central
Sai O	สายออ	Non Thai	โนนไทย	Nakhon Ratchasima	นครราชสีมา	North-East
Sai Rong Khon	ไทรโรงโขน	Taphan Hin	ตะพานหิน	Phichit	พิจิตร	Central
Sai Sopha	ไทรโสภา	Phrasaeng	พระแสง	Surat Thani	สุราษฎร์ธานี	South
Sai Taku	สายตะกู	Ban Kruat	บ้านกรวด	Buriram	บุรีรัมย์	North-East
Sai Thai	ไสไทย	Mueang Krabi	เมืองกระบี่	Krabi	กระบี่	South
Sai Thong	ทรายทอง	Si Bun Rueang	ศรีบุญเรือง	Nong Bua Lamphu	หนองบัวลำภู	North-East
Sai Thong	ทรายทอง	Bang Saphan Noi	บางสะพานน้อย	Prachuap Khiri Khan	ประจวบคีรีขันธ์	West
Sai Thong	ทรายทอง	Huai Mek	ห้วยเม็ก	Kalasin	กาฬสินธุ์	North-East
Sai Thong	ไทรทอง	Mai Kaen	ไม้แก่น	Pattani	ปัตตานี	South
Sai Thong	ไทรทอง	Chai Buri	ชัยบุรี	Surat Thani	สุราษฎร์ธานี	South
Sai Thong	ไทรทอง	Khlong Hat	คลองหาด	Sa Kaeo	สระแก้ว	East
Sai Thong	สายทอง	Pa Mok	ป่าโมก	Ang Thong	อ่างทอง	Central
Sai Yai	ไทรใหญ่	Sai Noi	ไทรน้อย	Nonthaburi	นนทบุรี	Central
Sai Yoi	ไทรย้อย	Den Chai	เด่นชัย	Phrae	แพร่	North
Sai Yoi	ไทรย้อย	Noen Maprang	เนินมะปราง	Phitsanulok	พิษณุโลก	Central
Sai Yok	ไทรโยค	Sai Yok	ไทรโยค	Kanchanaburi	กาญจนบุรี	West
Saira	ไสหร้า	Chawang	ฉวาง	Nakhon Si Thammarat	นครศรีธรรมราช	South
Sak Lek	สากเหล็ก	Sak Lek	สากเหล็ก	Phichit	พิจิตร	Central
Sak Long	สักหลง	Lom Sak	หล่มสัก	Phetchabun	เพชรบูรณ์	Central
Sak Ngam	สักงาม	Khlong Lan	คลองลาน	Kamphaeng Phet	กำแพงเพชร	Central
Sakae	สะแก	Satuek	สตึก	Buriram	บุรีรัมย์	North-East
Sakae Krang	สะแกกรัง	Mueang Uthai Thani	เมืองอุทัยธานี	Uthai Thani	อุทัยธานี	Central
Sakae Phrong	สะแกโพรง	Mueang Buriram	เมืองบุรีรัมย์	Buriram	บุรีรัมย์	North-East
Sakae Rap	สะแกราบ	Khok Samrong	โคกสำโรง	Lopburi	ลพบุรี	Central
Sakae Rat	สะแกราช	Pak Thong Chai	ปักธงชัย	Nakhon Ratchasima	นครราชสีมา	North-East
Sakae Sam	สะแกซำ	Mueang Buriram	เมืองบุรีรัมย์	Buriram	บุรีรัมย์	North-East
Sakam	สะกำ	Mayo	มายอ	Pattani	ปัตตานี	South
Sakat	สกาด	Pua	ปัว	Nan	น่าน	North
Sakat	สะกาด	Sangkha	สังขะ	Surin	สุรินทร์	North-East
Sakho Bon	สาคอบน	Mayo	มายอ	Pattani	ปัตตานี	South
Sakho Tai	สาคอใต้	Mayo	มายอ	Pattani	ปัตตานี	South
Sakhon	สาคร	Tha Phae	ท่าแพ	Satun	สตูล	South
Sakhrai	สระใคร	Sakhrai	สระใคร	Nong Khai	หนองคาย	North-East
Sakhu	สาคู	Thalang	ถลาง	Phuket	ภูเก็ต	South
Sakhu	สาคู	Phrasaeng	พระแสง	Surat Thani	สุราษฎร์ธานี	South
Sako	ซากอ	Si Sakhon	ศรีสาคร	Narathiwat	นราธิวาส	South
Sakom	สะกอม	Chana (Malay: Chenok)	จะนะ	Songkhla	สงขลา	South
Sakom	สะกอม	Thepha (Malay: Tiba)	เทพา	Songkhla	สงขลา	South
Sala	ศาลา	Ko Kha	เกาะคา	Lampang	ลำปาง	North
Sala Daeng	ศาลาแดง	Mueang Ang Thong	เมืองอ่างทอง	Ang Thong	อ่างทอง	Central
Sala Daeng	ศาลาแดง	Krok Phra	โกรกพระ	Nakhon Sawan	นครสวรรค์	Central
Sala Daeng	ศาลาแดง	Bang Nam Priao	บางน้ำเปรี้ยว	Chachoengsao	ฉะเชิงเทรา	East
Sala Dan	ศาลาด่าน	Ko Lanta	เกาะลันตา	Krabi	กระบี่	South
Sala Khao	ศาลาขาว	Mueang Suphanburi	เมืองสุพรรณบุรี	Suphan Buri	สุพรรณบุรี	Central
Sala Khru	ศาลาครุ	Nong Suea	หนองเสือ	Pathum Thani	ปทุมธานี	Central
Sala Klang	ศาลากลาง	Bang Kruai	บางกรวย	Nonthaburi	นนทบุรี	Central
Sala Lai	ศาลาลาย	Chon Daen	ชนแดน	Phetchabun	เพชรบูรณ์	Central
Sala Lamduan	ศาลาลำดวน	Mueang Sa Kaeo	เมืองสระแก้ว	Sa Kaeo	สระแก้ว	East
Sala Loi	ศาลาลอย	Tha Ruea	ท่าเรือ	Phra Nakhon Si Ayutthaya	พระนครศรีอยุธยา	Central
Sala Mai	ศาลาใหม่	Tak Bai (Malay: Tabal)	ตากใบ	Narathiwat	นราธิวาส	South
Sala Ri Thai	ศาลารีไทย	Sao Hai	เสาไห้	Saraburi	สระบุรี	Central
Sala Thammasop	ศาลาธรรมสพน์	Khet Thawi Watthana	ทวีวัฒนา	Bangkok	กรุงเทพมหานคร	Central
Salaeng	แสลง	Mueang Chanthaburi	เมืองจันทบุรี	Chanthaburi	จันทบุรี	East
Salaeng Phan	แสลงพัน	Wang Muang	วังม่วง	Saraburi	สระบุรี	Central
Salaeng Phan	แสลงพัน	Lam Plai Mat	ลำปลายมาศ	Buriram	บุรีรัมย์	North-East
Salaeng Phan	แสลงพันธ์	Mueang Surin	เมืองสุรินทร์	Surin	สุรินทร์	North-East
Salaeng Thon	แสลงโทน	Prakhon Chai	ประโคนชัย	Buriram	บุรีรัมย์	North-East
Salakdai	สลักได	Mueang Surin	เมืองสุรินทร์	Surin	สุรินทร์	North-East
Salalai	ศาลาลัย	Sam Roi Yot	สามร้อยยอด	Prachuap Khiri Khan	ประจวบคีรีขันธ์	West
Salaya	ศาลายา	Phutthamonthon	พุทธมณฑล	Nakhon Pathom	นครปฐม	Central
Sali	สาลี	Bang Pla Ma	บางปลาม้า	Suphan Buri	สุพรรณบุรี	Central
Salokbat	สลกบาตร	Khanu Woralaksaburi	ขาณุวรลักษบุรี	Kamphaeng Phet	กำแพงเพชร	Central
Saluang	สะลวง	Mae Rim	แม่ริม	Chiang Mai	เชียงใหม่	North
Salui	สลุย	Tha Sae	ท่าแซะ	Chumphon	ชุมพร	South
Sam	ซำ	Mueang Sisaket	เมืองศรีสะเกษ	Sisaket	ศรีสะเกษ	North-East
Sam Bandit	สามบัณฑิต	Uthai	อุทัย	Phra Nakhon Si Ayutthaya	พระนครศรีอยุธยา	Central
Sam Chuk	สามชุก	Sam Chuk	สามชุก	Suphan Buri	สุพรรณบุรี	Central
Sam Kha	สามขา	Kuchinarai	กุฉินารายณ์	Kalasin	กาฬสินธุ์	North-East
Sam Khok	สามโคก	Sam Khok	สามโคก	Pathum Thani	ปทุมธานี	Central
Sam Khwai Phueak	สามควายเผือก	Mueang Nakhon Pathom	เมืองนครปฐม	Nakhon Phanom	นครพนม	North-East
Sam Ko	สามกอ	Sena	เสนา	Phra Nakhon Si Ayutthaya	พระนครศรีอยุธยา	Central
Sam Krathai	สามกระทาย	Kui Buri	กุยบุรี	Prachuap Khiri Khan	ประจวบคีรีขันธ์	West
Sam Marong	สำมะโรง	Mueang Phetchaburi	เมืองเพชรบุรี	Phetchaburi	เพชรบุรี	West
Sam Mueang	สามเมือง	Lat Bua Luang	ลาดบัวหลวง	Phra Nakhon Si Ayutthaya	พระนครศรีอยุธยา	Central
Sam Mueang	สามเมือง	Sida	สีดา	Nakhon Ratchasima	นครราชสีมา	North-East
Sam Muen	สามหมื่น	Mae Ramat	แม่ระมาด	Tak	ตาก	West
Sam Ngam	สามง่าม	Don Tum	ดอนตูม	Nakhon Pathom	นครปฐม	Central
Sam Ngam	สามง่าม	Sam Ngam	สามง่าม	Phichit	พิจิตร	Central
Sam Ngam	สามง่าม	Pho Thong	โพธิ์ทอง	Ang Thong	อ่างทอง	Central
Sam Ngam Tha Bot	สามง่ามท่าโบสถ์	Hankha	หันคา	Chai Nat	ชัยนาท	Central
Sam Ngao	สามเงา	Sam Ngao	สามเงา	Tak	ตาก	West
Sam Phaniang	สำพะเนียง	Non Daeng	โนนแดง	Nakhon Ratchasima	นครราชสีมา	North-East
Sam Phaniang	สำพะเนียง	Ban Phraek	บ้านแพรก	Phra Nakhon Si Ayutthaya	พระนครศรีอยุธยา	Central
Sam Phi Nong	สามพี่น้อง	Kaeng Hang Maeo	แก่งหางแมว	Chanthaburi	จันทบุรี	East
Sam Phong	สามผง	Si Songkhram	ศรีสงคราม	Nakhon Phanom	นครพนม	North-East
Sam Phran	สามพราน	Sam Phran	สามพราน	Nakhon Pathom	นครปฐม	Central
Sam Phrao	สามพร้าว	Mueang Udon Thani	เมืองอุดรธานี	Udon Thani	อุดรธานี	North-East
Sam Phraya	สามพระยา	Cha-am	ชะอำ	Phetchaburi	เพชรบุรี	West
Sam Phuang	สามพวง	Khiri Mat	คีรีมาศ	Sukhothai	สุโขทัย	Central
Sam Pot Won	สัมปทวน	Nakhon Chai Si	นครชัยศรี	Nakhon Pathom	นครปฐม	Central
Sam Roi Yot	สามร้อยยอด	Sam Roi Yot	สามร้อยยอด	Prachuap Khiri Khan	ประจวบคีรีขันธ์	West
Sam Ruean	สามเรือน	Mueang Ratchaburi	เมืองราชบุรี	Ratchaburi	ราชบุรี	West
Sam Ruean	สามเรือน	Bang Pa-in	บางปะอิน	Phra Nakhon Si Ayutthaya	พระนครศรีอยุธยา	Central
Sam Ruean	สามเรือน	Si Samrong	ศรีสำโรง	Sukhothai	สุโขทัย	Central
Sam Sen Nai	สามเสนใน	Khet Phaya Thai	พญาไท	Bangkok	กรุงเทพมหานคร	Central
Sam Sen Nok	สามเสนนอก	Khet Huai Khwang	ห้วยขวาง	Bangkok	กรุงเทพมหานคร	Central
Sam Suan	สามสวน	Ban Thaen	บ้านแท่น	Chaiyaphum	ชัยภูมิ	North-East
Sam Tambon	สามตำบล	Chulabhorn	จุฬาภรณ์	Nakhon Si Thammarat	นครศรีธรรมราช	South
Sam Thai	สามไถ	Nakhon Luang	นครหลวง	Phra Nakhon Si Ayutthaya	พระนครศรีอยุธยา	Central
Sam Wa Tawan Ok	สามวาตะวันออก	Khet Khlong Sam Wa	คลองสามวา	Bangkok	กรุงเทพมหานคร	Central
Sam Wa Tawan Tok	สามวาตะวันตก	Khet Khlong Sam Wa	คลองสามวา	Bangkok	กรุงเทพมหานคร	Central
Sam Waeng	สามแวง	Huai Rat	ห้วยราช	Buriram	บุรีรัมย์	North-East
Sam Yaek	สามแยก	Wichian Buri	วิเชียรบุรี	Phetchabun	เพชรบูรณ์	Central
Sam Yang	ซำยาง	Si Chomphu	สีชมพู	Khon Kaen	ขอนแก่น	North-East
Samae Dam	แสมดำ	Khet Bang Khun Thian	บางขุนเทียน	Bangkok	กรุงเทพมหานคร	Central
Samaesan	แสมสาร	Sattahip	สัตหีบ	Chonburi	ชลบุรี	East
Samai	สมัย	Sop Prap	สบปราบ	Lampang	ลำปาง	North
Samakkhi	สามัคคี	Nam Som	น้ำโสม	Udon Thani	อุดรธานี	North-East
Samakkhi	สามัคคี	Rong Kham	ร่องคำ	Kalasin	กาฬสินธุ์	North-East
Samakkhi	สามัคคี	Rueso (Malay: Rusa)	รือเสาะ	Narathiwat	นราธิวาส	South
Samakkhi Phatthana	สามัคคีพัฒนา	Akat Amnuai	อากาศอำนวย	Sakon Nakhon	สกลนคร	North-East
Samet	เสม็จ	Samrong Thap	สำโรงทาบ	Surin	สุรินทร์	North-East
Samet	เสม็ด	Mueang Chonburi	เมืองชลบุรี	Chonburi	ชลบุรี	East
Samet	เสม็ด	Mueang Buriram	เมืองบุรีรัมย์	Buriram	บุรีรัมย์	North-East
Samet Nuea	เสม็ดเหนือ	Bang Khla	บางคล้า	Chachoengsao	ฉะเชิงเทรา	East
Samet Tai	เสม็ดใต้	Bang Khla	บางคล้า	Chachoengsao	ฉะเชิงเทรา	East
Samkha	สามขา	Phon Sai	โพนทราย	Roi Et	ร้อยเอ็ด	North-East
Samko	สามโก้	Samko	สามโก้	Ang Thong	อ่างทอง	Central
Samnak Bok	สำนักบก	Mueang Chonburi	เมืองชลบุรี	Chonburi	ชลบุรี	East
Samnak Kham	สำนักขาม	Sadao (Malay: Sendawa)	สะเดา	Songkhla	สงขลา	South
Samnak Khun Nen	สำนักขุนเณร	Dong Charoen	ดงเจริญ	Phichit	พิจิตร	Central
Samnak Taeo	สำนักแต้ว	Sadao (Malay: Sendawa)	สะเดา	Songkhla	สงขลา	South
Samnak Takhro	สำนักตะคร้อ	Thepharak	เทพารักษ์	Nakhon Ratchasima	นครราชสีมา	North-East
Samnak Thon	สำนักท้อน	Ban Chang	บ้านฉาง	Rayong	ระยอง	East
Samnak Thong	สำนักทอง	Mueang Rayong	เมืองระยอง	Rayong	ระยอง	East
Samo	สมอ	Prang Ku	ปรางค์กู่	Sisaket	ศรีสะเกษ	North-East
Samo Khae	สมอแข	Mueang Phitsanulok	เมืองพิษณุโลก	Phitsanulok	พิษณุโลก	Central
Samo Khon	สมอโคน	Ban Tak	บ้านตาก	Tak	ตาก	West
Samo Phlue	สมอพลือ	Ban Lat	บ้านลาด	Phetchaburi	เพชรบุรี	West
Samo Thong	สมอทอง	Tha Chana	ท่าชนะ	Surat Thani	สุราษฎร์ธานี	South
Samoeng Nuea	สะเมิงเหนือ	Samoeng	สะเมิง	Chiang Mai	เชียงใหม่	North
Samoeng Tai	สะเมิงใต้	Samoeng	สะเมิง	Chiang Mai	เชียงใหม่	North
Samphan	สัมพันธ์	Si Maha Phot	ศรีมหาโพธิ	Prachin Buri	ปราจีนบุรี	East
Samphan Ta	สำพันตา	Na Di	นาดี	Prachin Buri	ปราจีนบุรี	East
Samphanthawong	สัมพันธวงศ์	Khet Samphanthawong	สัมพันธวงศ์	Bangkok	กรุงเทพมหานคร	Central
Samphao Lom	สำเภาล่ม	Phra Nakhon Si Ayutthaya	พระนครศรีอยุธยา	Phra Nakhon Si Ayutthaya	พระนครศรีอยุธยา	Central
Samphao Lun	สำเภาลูน	Buachet	บัวเชด	Surin	สุรินทร์	North-East
Samran	สำราญ	Sam Chai	สามชัย	Kalasin	กาฬสินธุ์	North-East
Samran	สำราญ	Mueang Khon Kaen	เมืองขอนแก่น	Khon Kaen	ขอนแก่น	North-East
Samran Rat	สำราญราษฎร์	Khet Phra Nakhon	พระนคร	Bangkok	กรุงเทพมหานคร	Central
Samran Rat	สำราญราษฎร์	Doi Saket	ดอยสะเก็ด	Chiang Mai	เชียงใหม่	North
Samran Tai	สำราญใต้	Sam Chai	สามชัย	Kalasin	กาฬสินธุ์	North-East
Samre	สำเหร่	Khet Thon Buri	ธนบุรี	Bangkok	กรุงเทพมหานคร	Central
Samrit	สัมฤทธิ์	Phimai	พิมาย	Nakhon Ratchasima	นครราชสีมา	North-East
Samrong	สำโรง	Samrong	สำโรง	Ubon Ratchathani	อุบลราชธานี	North-East
Samrong	สำโรง	Phra Pradaeng	พระประแดง	Samut Prakan	สมุทรปราการ	Central
Samrong	สำโรง	Na Chueak	นาเชือก	Maha Sarakham	มหาสารคาม	North-East
Samrong	สำโรง	Tan Sum	ตาลสุม	Ubon Ratchathani	อุบลราชธานี	North-East
Samrong	สำโรง	Pho Sai	โพธิ์ไทร	Ubon Ratchathani	อุบลราชธานี	North-East
Samrong	สำโรง	Pak Thong Chai	ปักธงชัย	Nakhon Ratchasima	นครราชสีมา	North-East
Samrong	สำโรง	Non Thai	โนนไทย	Nakhon Ratchasima	นครราชสีมา	North-East
Samrong	สำโรง	Phlapphla Chai	พลับพลาชัย	Buriram	บุรีรัมย์	North-East
Samrong	สำโรง	Uthumphon Phisai	อุทุมพรพิสัย	Sisaket	ศรีสะเกษ	North-East
Samrong	สำโรง	Nong Song Hong	หนองสองห้อง	Khon Kaen	ขอนแก่น	North-East
Samrong	สำโรง	Mueang Surin	เมืองสุรินทร์	Surin	สุรินทร์	North-East
Samrong Chai	สำโรงชัย	Phaisali	ไพศาลี	Nakhon Sawan	นครสวรรค์	Central
Samrong Klang	สำโรงกลาง	Phra Pradaeng	พระประแดง	Samut Prakan	สมุทรปราการ	Central
Samrong Mai	สำโรงใหม่	Lahan Sai	ละหานทราย	Buriram	บุรีรัมย์	North-East
Samrong Nuea	สำโรงเหนือ	Mueang Samut Prakan	เมืองสมุทรปราการ	Samut Prakan	สมุทรปราการ	Central
Samrong Phlan	สำโรงพลัน	Phrai Bueng	ไพรบึง	Sisaket	ศรีสะเกษ	North-East
Samrong Prasat	สำโรงปราสาท	Prang Ku	ปรางค์กู่	Sisaket	ศรีสะเกษ	North-East
Samrong Ta Chen	สำโรงตาเจ็น	Khukhan	ขุขันธ์	Sisaket	ศรีสะเกษ	North-East
Samrong Tai	สำโรงใต้	Phra Pradaeng	พระประแดง	Samut Prakan	สมุทรปราการ	Central
Samrong Thap	สำโรงทาบ	Samrong Thap	สำโรงทาบ	Surin	สุรินทร์	North-East
Samut	สมุด	Prasat	ปราสาท	Surin	สุรินทร์	North-East
San	ส้าน	Wiang Sa	เวียงสา	Nan	น่าน	North
San Chao Rong Thong	ศาลเจ้าโรงทอง	Wiset Chai Chan	วิเศษชัยชาญ	Ang Thong	อ่างทอง	Central
San Chaopho Suea	ศาลเจ้าพ่อเสือ	Khet Phra Nakhon	พระนคร	Bangkok	กรุงเทพมหานคร	Central
San Chit	สารจิตร	Si Satchanalai	ศรีสัชนาลัย	Sukhothai	สุโขทัย	Central
San Don Kaeo	สันดอนแก้ว	Mae Tha	แม่ทะ	Lampang	ลำปาง	North
San Kamphaeng	สันกำแพง	San Kamphaeng	สันกำแพง	Chiang Mai	เชียงใหม่	North
San Khong	สันโค้ง	Dok Khamtai	ดอกคำใต้	Phayao	พะเยา	North
San Klang	สันกลาง	San Kamphaeng	สันกำแพง	Chiang Mai	เชียงใหม่	North
San Klang	สันกลาง	San Pa Tong	สันป่าตอง	Chiang Mai	เชียงใหม่	North
San Klang	สันกลาง	Phan	พาน	Chiang Rai	เชียงราย	North
San Maha Phon	สันมหาพน	Mae Taeng	แม่แตง	Chiang Mai	เชียงใหม่	North
San Makha	สันมะค่า	Pa Daet	ป่าแดด	Chiang Rai	เชียงราย	North
San Makhet	สันมะเค็ด	Phan	พาน	Chiang Rai	เชียงราย	North
San Na Meng	สันนาเม็ง	San Sai	สันทราย	Chiang Mai	เชียงใหม่	North
San Na Nong Mai	ส้านนาหนองใหม่	Wiang Sa	เวียงสา	Nan	น่าน	North
San Pa Muang	สันป่าม่วง	Mueang Phayao	เมืองพะเยา	Phayao	พะเยา	North
San Pa Pao	สันป่าเปา	San Sai	สันทราย	Chiang Mai	เชียงใหม่	North
San Pa Tong	สันป่าตอง	Na Chueak	นาเชือก	Maha Sarakham	มหาสารคาม	North-East
San Pa Yang	สันป่ายาง	Mae Taeng	แม่แตง	Chiang Mai	เชียงใหม่	North
San Phak Wan	สันผักหวาน	Hang Dong	หางดง	Chiang Mai	เชียงใหม่	North
San Phi Suea	สันผีเสื้อ	Mueang Chiang Mai	เมืองเชียงใหม่	Chiang Mai	เชียงใหม่	North
San Phranet	สันพระเนตร	San Sai	สันทราย	Chiang Mai	เชียงใหม่	North
San Pong	สันโป่ง	Mae Rim	แม่ริม	Chiang Mai	เชียงใหม่	North
San Pu Loei	สันปูเลย	Doi Saket	ดอยสะเก็ด	Chiang Mai	เชียงใหม่	North
San Sai	สันทราย	Saraphi	สารภี	Chiang Mai	เชียงใหม่	North
San Sai	สันทราย	Phrao	พร้าว	Chiang Mai	เชียงใหม่	North
San Sai	สันทราย	Mae Chan	แม่จัน	Chiang Rai	เชียงราย	North
San Sai	สันทราย	Fang	ฝาง	Chiang Mai	เชียงใหม่	North
San Sai	สันทราย	Mueang Chiang Rai	เมืองเชียงราย	Chiang Rai	เชียงราย	North
San Sai Luang	สันทรายหลวง	San Sai	สันทราย	Chiang Mai	เชียงใหม่	North
San Sai Ngam	สันทรายงาม	Thoeng	เทิง	Chiang Rai	เชียงราย	North
San Sai Noi	สันทรายน้อย	San Sai	สันทราย	Chiang Mai	เชียงใหม่	North
San Sali	สันสลี	Wiang Pa Pao	เวียงป่าเป้า	Chiang Rai	เชียงราย	North
San Tom	สานตม	Phu Ruea	ภูเรือ	Loei	เลย	North-East
San Ton Mue	สันต้นหมื้อ	Mae Ai	แม่อาย	Chiang Mai	เชียงใหม่	North
Sanam Bin	สนามบิน	Khet Don Mueang	ดอนเมือง	Bangkok	กรุงเทพมหานคร	Central
Sanam Chaeng	สนามแจง	Ban Mi	บ้านหมี่	Lopburi	ลพบุรี	Central
Sanam Chai	สนามชัย	Satuek	สตึก	Buriram	บุรีรัมย์	North-East
Sanam Chai	สนามชัย	Mueang Suphanburi	เมืองสุพรรณบุรี	Suphan Buri	สุพรรณบุรี	Central
Sanam Chai	สนามชัย	Bang Sai	บางไทร	Phra Nakhon Si Ayutthaya	พระนครศรีอยุธยา	Central
Sanam Chai	สนามชัย	Sathing Phra	สทิงพระ	Songkhla	สงขลา	South
Sanam Chai	สนามไชย	Na Yai Am	นายายอาม	Chanthaburi	จันทบุรี	East
Sanam Chan	สนามจันทร์	Ban Pho	บ้านโพธิ์	Chachoengsao	ฉะเชิงเทรา	East
Sanam Chan	สนามจันทร์	Mueang Nakhon Pathom	เมืองนครปฐม	Nakhon Phanom	นครพนม	North-East
Sanam Khli	สนามคลี	Mueang Suphanburi	เมืองสุพรรณบุรี	Suphan Buri	สุพรรณบุรี	Central
Sanam Khli	สนามคลี	Bang Krathum	บางกระทุ่ม	Phitsanulok	พิษณุโลก	Central
Sanam Yae	สนามแย้	Tha Maka	ท่ามะกา	Kanchanaburi	กาญจนบุรี	West
Sanap Thuep	สนับทึบ	Wang Noi	วังน้อย	Phra Nakhon Si Ayutthaya	พระนครศรีอยุธยา	Central
Sanchao Kai To	ศาลเจ้าไก่ต่อ	Lat Yao	ลาดยาว	Nakhon Sawan	นครสวรรค์	Central
Sang Kho	สร้างค้อ	Phu Phan	ภูพาน	Sakon Nakhon	สกลนคร	North-East
Sang Khom	สร้างคอม	Sang Khom	สร้างคอม	Udon Thani	อุดรธานี	North-East
Sang Ko	สร้างก่อ	Kut Chap	กุดจับ	Udon Thani	อุดรธานี	North-East
Sang Mek	สังเม็ก	Kantharalak	กันทรลักษ์	Sisaket	ศรีสะเกษ	North-East
Sang Nang Khao	สร้างนางขาว	Phon Phisai	โพนพิสัย	Nong Khai	หนองคาย	North-East
Sang Nok Tha	สร้างนกทา	Mueang Amnat Charoen	เมืองอำนาจเจริญ	Amnat Charoen	อำนาจเจริญ	North-East
Sang Paen	สร้างแป้น	Phen	เพ็ญ	Udon Thani	อุดรธานี	North-East
Sang Pi	สร้างปี่	Rasi Salai	ราษีไศล	Sisaket	ศรีสะเกษ	North-East
Sang Sok	สร่างโศก	Ban Mo	บ้านหมอ	Saraburi	สระบุรี	Central
Sang Tho	สร้างถ่อ	Khueang Nai	เขื่องใน	Ubon Ratchathani	อุบลราชธานี	North-East
Sang Tho Noi	สร้างถ่อน้อย	Hua Taphan	หัวตะพาน	Amnat Charoen	อำนาจเจริญ	North-East
Sang	ซาง	Seka	เซกา	Bueng Kan	บึงกาฬ	North-East
Sangkha	สังขะ	Sangkha	สังขะ	Surin	สุรินทร์	North-East
Sangkhom	สังคม	Sangkhom	สังคม	Nong Khai	หนองคาย	North-East
Sano Loi	โสนลอย	Bang Bua Thong	บางบัวทอง	Nonthaburi	นนทบุรี	Central
Sano	สะโน	Samrong Thap	สำโรงทาบ	Surin	สุรินทร์	North-East
Sano	สะนอ	Yarang	ยะรัง	Pattani	ปัตตานี	South
Sano	โสน	Khukhan	ขุขันธ์	Sisaket	ศรีสะเกษ	North-East
Sanom	สนม	Sanom	สนม	Surin	สุรินทร์	North-East
Santi Khiri	สันติคีรี	Mae La Noi	แม่ลาน้อย	Mae Hong Son	แม่ฮ่องสอน	North
Santi Suk	สันติสุข	Doi Lo	ดอยหล่อ	Chiang Mai	เชียงใหม่	North
Santi Suk	สันติสุข	Phan	พาน	Chiang Rai	เชียงราย	North
Sanuan	สนวน	Huai Rat	ห้วยราช	Buriram	บุรีรัมย์	North-East
Sao Cha-ngok	สาวชะโงก	Bang Khla	บางคล้า	Chachoengsao	ฉะเชิงเทรา	East
Sao Chingcha	เสาชิงช้า	Khet Phra Nakhon	พระนคร	Bangkok	กรุงเทพมหานคร	Central
Sao Diao	เสาเดียว	Nong Hong	หนองหงส์	Buriram	บุรีรัมย์	North-East
Sao Hae	สาวแห	Nong Hi	หนองฮี	Roi Et	ร้อยเอ็ด	North-East
Sao Hai	เสาไห้	Sao Hai	เสาไห้	Saraburi	สระบุรี	Central
Sao Hin	เสาหิน	Mae Sariang	แม่สะเรียง	Mae Hong Son	แม่ฮ่องสอน	North
Sao Lao	เสาเล้า	Nong Kung Si	หนองกุงศรี	Kalasin	กาฬสินธุ์	North-East
Sao Phao	เสาเภา	Sichon	สิชล	Nakhon Si Thammarat	นครศรีธรรมราช	South
Sao Rong Hai	สาวร้องไห้	Wiset Chai Chan	วิเศษชัยชาญ	Ang Thong	อ่างทอง	Central
Sao Thong	เสาธง	Ron Phibun	ร่อนพิบูลย์	Nakhon Si Thammarat	นครศรีธรรมราช	South
Sao Thong Chai	เสาธงชัย	Kantharalak	กันทรลักษ์	Sisaket	ศรีสะเกษ	North-East
Sao Thong Hin	เสาธงหิน	Bang Yai	บางใหญ่	Nonthaburi	นนทบุรี	Central
Sap Anan	ทรัพย์อนันต์	Tha Sae	ท่าแซะ	Chumphon	ชุมพร	South
Sap Mai Daeng	ซับไม้แดง	Bueng Sam Phan	บึงสามพัน	Phetchabun	เพชรบูรณ์	Central
Sap Makrut	ซับมะกรูด	Khlong Hat	คลองหาด	Sa Kaeo	สระแก้ว	East
Sap Noi	ซับน้อย	Wichian Buri	วิเชียรบุรี	Phetchabun	เพชรบูรณ์	Central
Sap Phaiwan	ทรัพย์ไพวัลย์	Erawan	เอราวัณ	Loei	เลย	North-East
Sap Phraya	ทรัพย์พระยา	Nang Rong	นางรอง	Buriram	บุรีรัมย์	North-East
Sap Phutsa	ซับพุทรา	Chon Daen	ชนแดน	Phetchabun	เพชรบูรณ์	Central
Sap Poep	ซับเปิบ	Wang Pong	วังโป่ง	Phetchabun	เพชรบูรณ์	Central
Sap Samo Thot	ซับสมอทอด	Bueng Sam Phan	บึงสามพัน	Phetchabun	เพชรบูรณ์	Central
Sap Sanun	ซับสนุ่น	Muak Lek	มวกเหล็ก	Saraburi	สระบุรี	Central
Sap Si Thong	ซับสีทอง	Mueang Chaiyaphum	เมืองชัยภูมิ	Chaiyaphum	ชัยภูมิ	North-East
Sap Sombun	ซับสมบูรณ์	Wichian Buri	วิเชียรบุรี	Phetchabun	เพชรบูรณ์	Central
Sap Sombun	ซับสมบูรณ์	Khok Pho Chai	โคกโพธิ์ไชย	Khon Kaen	ขอนแก่น	North-East
Sap Takhian	ซับตะเคียน	Chai Badan	ชัยบาดาล	Lopburi	ลพบุรี	Central
Sap Thawi	ทรัพย์ทวี	Ban Na Doem	บ้านนาเดิม	Surat Thani	สุราษฎร์ธานี	South
Sap Yai	ซับใหญ่	Sap Yai	ซับใหญ่	Chaiyaphum	ชัยภูมิ	North-East
Saphan Hin	สะพานหิน	Na Di	นาดี	Prachin Buri	ปราจีนบุรี	East
Saphan Hin	สะพานหิน	Nong Mamong	หนองมะโมง	Chai Nat	ชัยนาท	Central
Saphan Krai	สะพานไกร	Ban Lat	บ้านลาด	Phetchaburi	เพชรบุรี	West
Saphan Mai Kaen	สะพานไม้แก่น	Chana (Malay: Chenok)	จะนะ	Songkhla	สงขลา	South
Saphan Song	สะพานสอง	Khet Wang Thonglang	วังทองหลาง	Bangkok	กรุงเทพมหานคร	Central
Saphan Sung	สะพานสูง	Khet Saphan Sung	สะพานสูง	Bangkok	กรุงเทพมหานคร	Central
Saphan Thai	สะพานไทย	Bang Ban	บางบาล	Phra Nakhon Si Ayutthaya	พระนครศรีอยุธยา	Central
Saphang Thong	สระพังทอง	Khao Wong	เขาวง	Kalasin	กาฬสินธุ์	North-East
Saphli	สะพลี	Phato	พะโต๊ะ	Chumphon	ชุมพร	South
Saphue	สะพือ	Trakan Phuet Phon	ตระการพืชผล	Ubon Ratchathani	อุบลราชธานี	North-East
Saphung	สะพุง	Si Rattana	ศรีรัตนะ	Sisaket	ศรีสะเกษ	North-East
Sapphaya	สรรพยา	Sapphaya	สรรพยา	Chai Nat	ชัยนาท	Central
Sarai	สาหร่าย	Chum Phuang	ชุมพวง	Nakhon Ratchasima	นครราชสีมา	North-East
Saraphi	สารภี	Nong Bun Mak	หนองบุญมาก	Nakhon Ratchasima	นครราชสีมา	North-East
Saraphi	สารภี	Pho Sai	โพธิ์ไทร	Ubon Ratchathani	อุบลราชธานี	North-East
Saraphi	สารภี	Saraphi	สารภี	Chiang Mai	เชียงใหม่	North
Sarika	สาริกา	Mueang Nakhon Nayok	เมืองนครนายก	Nakhon Nayok	นครนายก	Central
Sateng	สะเตง	Mueang Yala	เมืองยะลา	Yala	ยะลา	South
Sateng Nok	สะเตงนอก	Mueang Yala	เมืองยะลา	Yala	ยะลา	South
Sathan	สถาน	Chiang Khong	เชียงของ	Chiang Rai	เชียงราย	North
Sathan	สถาน	Pua	ปัว	Nan	น่าน	North
Sathing Mo	สทิงหม้อ	Singhanakhon	สิงหนคร	Songkhla	สงขลา	South
Sathon	สะท้อน	Na Thawi (Malay: Nawi)	นาทวี	Songkhla	สงขลา	South
Sato	สะตอ	Khao Saming	เขาสมิง	Trat	ตราด	East
Saton	สะตอน	Soi Dao	สอยดาว	Chanthaburi	จันทบุรี	East
Sattahip	สัตหีบ	Sattahip	สัตหีบ	Chonburi	ชลบุรี	East
Satuek	สตึก	Satuek	สตึก	Buriram	บุรีรัมย์	North-East
Sawaeng Ha	แสวงหา	Sawaeng Ha	แสวงหา	Ang Thong	อ่างทอง	Central
Sawai	สวาย	Mueang Surin	เมืองสุรินทร์	Surin	สุรินทร์	North-East
Sawai	สวาย	Prang Ku	ปรางค์กู่	Sisaket	ศรีสะเกษ	North-East
Sawai Chik	สวายจีก	Mueang Buriram	เมืองบุรีรัมย์	Buriram	บุรีรัมย์	North-East
Sawang	สว่าง	Sawang Wirawong	สว่างวีรวงศ์	Ubon Ratchathani	อุบลราชธานี	North-East
Sawang	สว่าง	Phon Thong	โพนทอง	Roi Et	ร้อยเอ็ด	North-East
Sawang	สว่าง	Phanna Nikhom	พรรณนานิคม	Sakon Nakhon	สกลนคร	North-East
Sawang Arom	สว่างอารมณ์	Sawang Arom	สว่างอารมณ์	Uthai Thani	อุทัยธานี	Central
Sawang Arom	สว่างอารมณ์	Dok Khamtai	ดอกคำใต้	Phayao	พะเยา	North
Sawang Daen Din	สว่างแดนดิน	Sawang Daen Din	สว่างแดนดิน	Sakon Nakhon	สกลนคร	North-East
Sawathi	สาวะถี	Mueang Khon Kaen	เมืองขอนแก่น	Khon Kaen	ขอนแก่น	North-East
Sawi	สวี	Sawi	สวี	Chumphon	ชุมพร	South
Sawiat	เสวียด	Tha Chang	ท่าฉาง	Surat Thani	สุราษฎร์ธานี	South
Sawo	สาวอ	Rueso (Malay: Rusa)	รือเสาะ	Narathiwat	นราธิวาส	South
Se Pet	เซเป็ด	Trakan Phuet Phon	ตระการพืชผล	Ubon Ratchathani	อุบลราชธานี	North-East
Seka	เซกา	Seka	เซกา	Bueng Kan	บึงกาฬ	North-East
Sema Yai	เสมาใหญ่	Bua Yai	บัวใหญ่	Nakhon Ratchasima	นครราชสีมา	North-East
Sema	เสมา	Sung Noen	สูงเนิน	Nakhon Ratchasima	นครราชสีมา	North-East
Sena	เสนา	Uthai	อุทัย	Phra Nakhon Si Ayutthaya	พระนครศรีอยุธยา	Central
Sena	เสนา	Sena	เสนา	Phra Nakhon Si Ayutthaya	พระนครศรีอยุธยา	Central
Sena Nikhom	เสนานิคม	Khet Chatuchak	จตุจักร	Bangkok	กรุงเทพมหานคร	Central
Senangkhanikhom	เสนางคนิคม	Senangkhanikhom	เสนางคนิคม	Amnat Charoen	อำนาจเจริญ	North-East
Si	สิ	Khun Han	ขุนหาญ	Sisaket	ศรีสะเกษ	North-East
Si Banphot	ศรีบรรพต	Si Sakhon	ศรีสาคร	Narathiwat	นราธิวาส	South
Si Bua Ban	ศรีบัวบาน	Mueang Lamphun	เมืองลำพูน	Lamphun	ลำพูน	North
Si Bua Thong	สีบัวทอง	Sawaeng Ha	แสวงหา	Ang Thong	อ่างทอง	Central
Si Bun Rueang	ศรีบุญเรือง	Mueang Mukdahan	เมืองมุกดาหาร	Mukdahan	มุกดาหาร	North-East
Si Bun Rueang	ศรีบุญเรือง	Si Bun Rueang	ศรีบุญเรือง	Nong Bua Lamphu	หนองบัวลำภู	North-East
Si Bun Rueang	ศรีบุญเรือง	Chonnabot	ชนบท	Khon Kaen	ขอนแก่น	North-East
Si Chomphu	ศรีชมภู	Phon Charoen	พรเจริญ	Bueng Kan	บึงกาฬ	North-East
Si Chomphu	สีชมพู	Na Kae	นาแก	Nakhon Phanom	นครพนม	North-East
Si Chomphu	สีชมพู	Si Chomphu	สีชมพู	Khon Kaen	ขอนแก่น	North-East
Si Chula	ศรีจุฬา	Mueang Nakhon Nayok	เมืองนครนายก	Nakhon Nayok	นครนายก	Central
Si Don Chai	ศรีดอนชัย	Chiang Khong	เชียงของ	Chiang Rai	เชียงราย	North
Si Don Chai	ศรีดอนไชย	Thoeng	เทิง	Chiang Rai	เชียงราย	North
Si Don Mun	ศรีดอนมูล	Chiang Saen	เชียงแสน	Chiang Rai	เชียงราย	North
Si Dong Yen	ศรีดงเย็น	Chai Prakan	ปราการ	Chiang Mai	เชียงใหม่	North
Si Ka-ang	ศรีกะอาง	Ban Na	บ้านนา	Nakhon Nayok	นครนายก	Central
Si Kaeo	ศรีแก้ว	Si Rattana	ศรีรัตนะ	Sisaket	ศรีสะเกษ	North-East
Si Kaeo	สีแก้ว	Mueang Roi Et	เมืองร้อยเอ็ด	Roi Et	ร้อยเอ็ด	North-East
Si Kai	สีกาย	Mueang Nong Khai	เมืองหนองคาย	Nong Khai	หนองคาย	North-East
Si Kan	สีกัน	Khet Don Mueang	ดอนเมือง	Bangkok	กรุงเทพมหานคร	Central
Si Kham	ศรีค้ำ	Mae Chan	แม่จัน	Chiang Rai	เชียงราย	North
Si Khiri Mat	ศรีคีรีมาศ	Khiri Mat	คีรีมาศ	Sukhothai	สุโขทัย	Central
Si Khit	สี่ขีด	Sichon	สิชล	Nakhon Si Thammarat	นครศรีธรรมราช	South
Si Khlong	สี่คลอง	Mueang Lopburi	เมืองลพบุรี	Lopburi	ลพบุรี	Central
Si Khot	ศรีโคตร	Chaturaphak Phiman	จตุรพักตรพิมาน	Roi Et	ร้อยเอ็ด	North-East
Si Lako	ศรีละกอ	Chakkarat	จักราช	Nakhon Ratchasima	นครราชสีมา	North-East
Si Liam	สี่เหลี่ยม	Prakhon Chai	ประโคนชัย	Buriram	บุรีรัมย์	North-East
Si Lom	สีลม	Khet Bang Rak	บางรัก	Bangkok	กรุงเทพมหานคร	Central
Si Maha Pho	ศรีมหาโพธิ์	Nakhon Chai Si	นครชัยศรี	Nakhon Pathom	นครปฐม	Central
Si Maha Phot	ศรีมหาโพธิ	Si Maha Phot	ศรีมหาโพธิ	Prachin Buri	ปราจีนบุรี	East
Si Mongkhon	ศรีมงคล	Sai Yok	ไทรโยค	Kanchanaburi	กาญจนบุรี	West
Si Mongkhon	ศรีมงคล	Bueng Sam Phan	บึงสามพัน	Phetchabun	เพชรบูรณ์	Central
Si Mueang Chum	ศรีเมืองชุม	Mae Sai	แม่สาย	Chiang Rai	เชียงราย	North
Si Muen	สี่หมื่น	Damnoen Saduak	ดำเนินสะดวก	Ratchaburi	ราชบุรี	West
Si Mum	สีมุม	Mueang Nakhon Ratchasima	เมืองนครราชสีมา	Nakhon Ratchasima	นครราชสีมา	North-East
Si Nakhon	ศรีนคร	Si Nakhon	ศรีนคร	Sukhothai	สุโขทัย	Central
Si Narong	ศรีณรงค์	Chumphon Buri	ชุมพลบุรี	Surin	สุรินทร์	North-East
Si Nawa	ศรีนาวา	Mueang Nakhon Nayok	เมืองนครนายก	Nakhon Nayok	นครนายก	Central
Si Non Ngam	ศรีโนนงาม	Si Rattana	ศรีรัตนะ	Sisaket	ศรีสะเกษ	North-East
Si O	สีออ	Kumphawapi	กุมภวาปี	Udon Thani	อุดรธานี	North-East
Si Phanom Mat	ศรีพนมมาศ	Laplae	ลับแล	Uttaradit	อุตรดิตถ์	North
Si Phraya	สีพยา	Tha Mai	ท่าใหม่	Chanthaburi	จันทบุรี	East
Si Pho Ngoen	ศรีโพธิ์เงิน	Pa Daet	ป่าแดด	Chiang Rai	เชียงราย	North
Si Phran	ศรีพราน	Sawaeng Ha	แสวงหา	Ang Thong	อ่างทอง	Central
Si Phum	ศรีภูมิ	Mueang Chiang Mai	เมืองเชียงใหม่	Chiang Mai	เชียงใหม่	North
Si Phum	ศรีภูมิ	Krasang	กระสัง	Buriram	บุรีรัมย์	North-East
Si Phum	ศรีภูมิ	Tha Wang Pha	ท่าวังผา	Nan	น่าน	North
Si Prachan	ศรีประจันต์	Si Prachan	ศรีประจันต์	Suphan Buri	สุพรรณบุรี	Central
Si Racha	ศรีราชา	Si Racha	ศรีราชา	Chonburi	ชลบุรี	East
Si Roi	สี่ร้อย	Wiset Chai Chan	วิเศษชัยชาญ	Ang Thong	อ่างทอง	Central
Si Sa-at	ศรีสะอาด	Khukhan	ขุขันธ์	Sisaket	ศรีสะเกษ	North-East
Si Sakhon	ศรีสาคร	Si Sakhon	ศรีสาคร	Narathiwat	นราธิวาส	South
Si Samran	ศรีสำราญ	Nam Som	น้ำโสม	Udon Thani	อุดรธานี	North-East
Si Samran	ศรีสำราญ	Song Phi Nong	สองพี่น้อง	Suphan Buri	สุพรรณบุรี	Central
Si Samran	ศรีสำราญ	Mueang Chan	เมืองจันทร์	Sisaket	ศรีสะเกษ	North-East
Si Samran	ศรีสำราญ	Wang Hin	วังหิน	Sisaket	ศรีสะเกษ	North-East
Si Samran	ศรีสำราญ	Phon Charoen	พรเจริญ	Bueng Kan	บึงกาฬ	North-East
Si Samran	ศรีสำราญ	Khon Sawan	คอนสวรรค์	Chaiyaphum	ชัยภูมิ	North-East
Si Satchanalai	ศรีสัชนาลัย	Si Satchanalai	ศรีสัชนาลัย	Sukhothai	สุโขทัย	Central
Si Sawang	ศรีสว่าง	Phon Sai	โพนทราย	Roi Et	ร้อยเอ็ด	North-East
Si Sawang	ศรีสว่าง	Na Pho	นาโพธิ์	Buriram	บุรีรัมย์	North-East
Si Somdet	ศรีสมเด็จ	Si Somdet	ศรีสมเด็จ	Roi Et	ร้อยเอ็ด	North-East
Si Somdet	ศรีสมเด็จ	Somdet	สมเด็จ	Kalasin	กาฬสินธุ์	North-East
Si Song Rak	ศรีสองรัก	Mueang Loei	เมืองเลย	Loei	เลย	North-East
Si Songkhram	ศรีสงคราม	Si Songkhram	ศรีสงคราม	Nakhon Phanom	นครพนม	North-East
Si Songkhram	ศรีสงคราม	Wang Saphung	วังสะพุง	Loei	เลย	North-East
Si Suk	ศรีสุข	Khueang Nai	เขื่องใน	Ubon Ratchathani	อุบลราชธานี	North-East
Si Suk	ศรีสุข	Si Chomphu	สีชมพู	Khon Kaen	ขอนแก่น	North-East
Si Suk	ศรีสุข	Si Narong	ศรีณรงค์	Surin	สุรินทร์	North-East
Si Suk	ศรีสุข	Samrong Thap	สำโรงทาบ	Surin	สุรินทร์	North-East
Si Suk	ศรีสุข	Kantharawichai	กันทรวิชัย	Maha Sarakham	มหาสารคาม	North-East
Si Suk	สีสุก	Chakkarat	จักราช	Nakhon Ratchasima	นครราชสีมา	North-East
Si Suk	สีสุก	Kaeng Sanam Nang	แก้งสนามนาง	Nakhon Ratchasima	นครราชสีมา	North-East
Si Suk Samran	ศรีสุขสำราญ	Ubolratana	อุบลรัตน์	Khon Kaen	ขอนแก่น	North-East
Si Sunthon	ศรีสุนทร	Thalang	ถลาง	Phuket	ภูเก็ต	South
Si Surat	ศรีสุราษฎร์	Damnoen Saduak	ดำเนินสะดวก	Ratchaburi	ราชบุรี	West
Si Suttho	ศรีสุทโธ	Ban Dung	บ้านดุง	Udon Thani	อุดรธานี	North-East
Si Than	ศรีฐาน	Phu Kradueng	ภูกระดึง	Loei	เลย	North-East
Si That	ศรีธาตุ	Si That	ศรีธาตุ	Udon Thani	อุดรธานี	North-East
Si Thep	ศรีเทพ	Si Thep	ศรีเทพ	Phetchabun	เพชรบูรณ์	Central
Si Thoi	ศรีถ้อย	Mae Chai	แม่ใจ	Phayao	พะเยา	North
Si Thoi	ศรีถ้อย	Mae Suai	แม่สรวย	Chiang Rai	เชียงราย	North
Si Tia	ศรีเตี้ย	Ban Hong	บ้านโฮ่ง	Lamphun	ลำพูน	North
Si Trakun	ศรีตระกูล	Khukhan	ขุขันธ์	Sisaket	ศรีสะเกษ	North-East
Si Wichai	ศรีวิชัย	Phunphin	พุนพิน	Surat Thani	สุราษฎร์ธานี	South
Si Wichai	ศรีวิชัย	Wanon Niwat	วานรนิวาส	Sakon Nakhon	สกลนคร	North-East
Si Wichai	ศรีวิชัย	Li	ลี้	Lamphun	ลำพูน	North
Si Wichian	สีวิเชียร	Nam Yuen	น้ำยืน	Ubon Ratchathani	อุบลราชธานี	North-East
Si Wilai	ศรีวิลัย	Selaphum	เสลภูมิ	Roi Et	ร้อยเอ็ด	North-East
Si Wilai	ศรีวิไล	Si Wilai	ศรีวิไล	Bueng Kan	บึงกาฬ	North-East
Si Yaek Maha Nak	สี่แยกมหานาค	Khet Dusit	ดุสิต	Bangkok	กรุงเทพมหานคร	Central
Siao	เสียว	Pho Si Suwan	โพธิ์ศรีสุวรรณ	Sisaket	ศรีสะเกษ	North-East
Siao	เสี้ยว	Mueang Loei	เมืองเลย	Loei	เลย	North-East
Sichon	สิชล	Sichon	สิชล	Nakhon Si Thammarat	นครศรีธรรมราช	South
Sida	สีดา	Sida	สีดา	Nakhon Ratchasima	นครราชสีมา	North-East
Sikhio	สีคิ้ว	Sikhio	สีคิ้ว	Nakhon Ratchasima	นครราชสีมา	North-East
Sila	ศิลา	Mueang Khon Kaen	เมืองขอนแก่น	Khon Kaen	ขอนแก่น	North-East
Sila	ศิลา	Lom Kao	หล่มเก่า	Phetchabun	เพชรบูรณ์	Central
Sila Dan	ศิลาดาน	Manorom	มโนรมย์	Chai Nat	ชัยนาท	Central
Sila Laeng	ศิลาแลง	Pua	ปัว	Nan	น่าน	North
Sila Loi	ศิลาลอย	Sam Roi Yot	สามร้อยยอด	Prachuap Khiri Khan	ประจวบคีรีขันธ์	West
Sila Phet	ศิลาเพชร	Pua	ปัว	Nan	น่าน	North
Sila Thip	ศิลาทิพย์	Chai Badan	ชัยบาดาล	Lopburi	ลพบุรี	Central
Sin Charoen	สินเจริญ	Phrasaeng	พระแสง	Surat Thani	สุราษฎร์ธานี	South
Sin Pun	สินปุน	Phrasaeng	พระแสง	Surat Thani	สุราษฎร์ธานี	South
Sin Pun	สินปุน	Khao Phanom	เขาพนม	Krabi	กระบี่	South
Sing	สิงห์	Sai Yok	ไทรโยค	Kanchanaburi	กาญจนบุรี	West
Sing	สิงห์	Bang Rachan	บางระจัน	Sing Buri	สิงห์บุรี	Central
Sing Khok	สิงห์โคก	Kaset Wisai	เกษตรวิสัย	Roi Et	ร้อยเอ็ด	North-East
Singhanat	สิงหนาท	Lat Bua Luang	ลาดบัวหลวง	Phra Nakhon Si Ayutthaya	พระนครศรีอยุธยา	Central
Singto Thong	สิงโตทอง	Bang Nam Priao	บางน้ำเปรี้ยว	Chachoengsao	ฉะเชิงเทรา	East
Sip Et Sok	สิบเอ็ดศอก	Ban Pho	บ้านโพธิ์	Chachoengsao	ฉะเชิงเทรา	East
Siri Rat	ศิริราช	Khet Bangkok Noi	บางกอกน้อย	Bangkok	กรุงเทพมหานคร	Central
Sisa Chorakhe Noi	ศีรษะจรเข้น้อย	Bang Sao Thong	บางเสาธง	Samut Prakan	สมุทรปราการ	Central
Sisa Chorakhe Yai	ศีรษะจรเข้ใหญ่	Bang Sao Thong	บางเสาธง	Samut Prakan	สมุทรปราการ	Central
Sisa Krabue	ศีรษะกระบือ	Ongkharak	องครักษ์	Nakhon Nayok	นครนายก	Central
Sisa Thong	ศรีษะทอง	Nakhon Chai Si	นครชัยศรี	Nakhon Pathom	นครปฐม	Central
So	โซ่	So Phisai	โซ่พิสัย	Bueng Kan	บึงกาฬ	North-East
Soem	เซิม	Phon Phisai	โพนพิสัย	Nong Khai	หนองคาย	North-East
Soem Khwa	เสริมขวา	Soem Ngam	เสริมงาม	Lampang	ลำปาง	North
Soem Klang	เสริมกลาง	Soem Ngam	เสริมงาม	Lampang	ลำปาง	North
Soem Sai	เสริมซ้าย	Soem Ngam	เสริมงาม	Lampang	ลำปาง	North
Soeng Sang	เสิงสาง	Soeng Sang	เสิงสาง	Nakhon Ratchasima	นครราชสีมา	North-East
Soephloe	เสอเพลอ	Kumphawapi	กุมภวาปี	Udon Thani	อุดรธานี	North-East
Soi	สรอย	Wang Chin	วังชิ้น	Phrae	แพร่	North
Soi Fa	สร้อยฟ้า	Photharam	โพธาราม	Ratchaburi	ราชบุรี	West
Soi Lakhon	สร้อยละคร	Lat Yao	ลาดยาว	Nakhon Sawan	นครสวรรค์	Central
Soi Phrao	สร้อยพร้าว	Nong Han	หนองหาน	Udon Thani	อุดรธานี	North-East
Soi Thong	สร้อยทอง	Takhli	ตาคลี	Nakhon Sawan	นครสวรรค์	Central
Sok Kam	โสกก่าม	Seka	เซกา	Bueng Kan	บึงกาฬ	North-East
Sok Nok Ten	โสกนกเต็น	Phon	พล	Khon Kaen	ขอนแก่น	North-East
Sok Pla Duk	โสกปลาดุก	Nong Bua Rawe	หนองบัวระเหว	Chaiyaphum	ชัยภูมิ	North-East
Sok Saeng	โสกแสง	Na Chaluai	นาจะหลวย	Ubon Ratchathani	อุบลราชธานี	North-East
Som Poi	ส้มป่อย	Rasi Salai	ราษีไศล	Sisaket	ศรีสะเกษ	North-East
Som Poi	ส้มป่อย	Non Din Daeng	โนนดินแดง	Buriram	บุรีรัมย์	North-East
Som Sa-at	สมสะอาด	Kuchinarai	กุฉินารายณ์	Kalasin	กาฬสินธุ์	North-East
Som Sa-at	สมสะอาด	Det Udom	เดชอุดม	Ubon Ratchathani	อุบลราชธานี	North-East
Som Sanuk	สมสนุก	Pak Khat	ปากคาด	Bueng Kan	บึงกาฬ	North-East
Som Wang	สมหวัง	Kong Ra	กงหรา	Phatthalung	พัทลุง	South
Som Yiam	โสมเยี่ยม	Nam Som	น้ำโสม	Udon Thani	อุดรธานี	North-East
Somdet	สมเด็จ	Somdet	สมเด็จ	Kalasin	กาฬสินธุ์	North-East
Somdet Chao Phraya	สมเด็จเจ้าพระยา	Khet Khlong San	คลองสาน	Bangkok	กรุงเทพมหานคร	Central
Somdet Charoen	สมเด็จเจริญ	Nong Prue	หนองปรือ	Kanchanaburi	กาญจนบุรี	West
Sompoi	ส้มป่อย	Chatturat	จัตุรัส	Chaiyaphum	ชัยภูมิ	North-East
Song	โซง	Nam Yuen	น้ำยืน	Ubon Ratchathani	อุบลราชธานี	North-East
Song Chan	สองชั้น	Krasang	กระสัง	Buriram	บุรีรัมย์	North-East
Song Dao	ส่องดาว	Song Dao	ส่องดาว	Sakon Nakhon	สกลนคร	North-East
Song Hong	สองห้อง	Mueang Buriram	เมืองบุรีรัมย์	Buriram	บุรีรัมย์	North-East
Song Hong	สองห้อง	Fak Tha	ฟากท่า	Uttaradit	อุตรดิตถ์	North
Song Hong	สองห้อง	Ban Phraek	บ้านแพรก	Phra Nakhon Si Ayutthaya	พระนครศรีอยุธยา	Central
Song Khanong	ทรงคนอง	Phra Pradaeng	พระประแดง	Samut Prakan	สมุทรปราการ	Central
Song Khanong	ทรงคนอง	Sam Phran	สามพราน	Nakhon Pathom	นครปฐม	Central
Song Khon	สองคอน	Kaeng Khoi	แก่งคอย	Saraburi	สระบุรี	Central
Song Khon	สองคอน	Fak Tha	ฟากท่า	Uttaradit	อุตรดิตถ์	North
Song Khon	สองคอน	Pho Sai	โพธิ์ไทร	Ubon Ratchathani	อุบลราชธานี	North-East
Song Khwae	สองแคว	Doi Lo	ดอยหล่อ	Chiang Mai	เชียงใหม่	North
Song Phi Nong	สองพี่น้อง	Song Phi Nong	สองพี่น้อง	Suphan Buri	สุพรรณบุรี	Central
Song Phi Nong	สองพี่น้อง	Tha Sae	ท่าแซะ	Chumphon	ชุมพร	South
Song Phi Nong	สองพี่น้อง	Kaeng Krachan	แก่งกระจาน	Phetchaburi	เพชรบุรี	West
Song Phi Nong	สองพี่น้อง	Tha Mai	ท่าใหม่	Chanthaburi	จันทบุรี	East
Song Phraek	สองแพรก	Chai Buri	ชัยบุรี	Surat Thani	สุราษฎร์ธานี	South
Song Phraek	สองแพรก	Mueang Phang Nga	เมืองพังงา	Phang Nga	พังงา	South
Song Plueai	สงเปลือย	Khao Wong	เขาวง	Kalasin	กาฬสินธุ์	North-East
Song Plueai	สงเปลือย	Na Mon	นามน	Kalasin	กาฬสินธุ์	North-East
Song Pueai	สงเปือย	Phu Wiang	ภูเวียง	Khon Kaen	ขอนแก่น	North-East
Song Salueng	สองสลึง	Klaeng	แกลง	Rayong	ระยอง	East
Song Tham	ทรงธรรม	Mueang Kamphaeng Phet	เมืองกำแพงเพชร	Kamphaeng Phet	กำแพงเพชร	Central
Song Yang	สงยาง	Si Mueang Mai	ศรีเมืองใหม่	Ubon Ratchathani	อุบลราชธานี	North-East
Sop Bong	สบบง	Phu Sang	ภูซาง	Phayao	พะเยา	North
Sop Khong	สบโขง	Omkoi	อมก๋อย	Chiang Mai	เชียงใหม่	North
Sop Mae Kha	สบแม่ข่า	Hang Dong	หางดง	Chiang Mai	เชียงใหม่	North
Sop Moei	สบเมย	Sop Moei	สบเมย	Mae Hong Son	แม่ฮ่องสอน	North
Sop Pat	สบป้าด	Mae Mo	แม่เมาะ	Lampang	ลำปาง	North
Sop Poeng	สบเปิง	Mae Taeng	แม่แตง	Chiang Mai	เชียงใหม่	North
Sop Prap	สบปราบ	Sop Prap	สบปราบ	Lampang	ลำปาง	North
Sop Sai	สบสาย	Sung Men	สูงเม่น	Phrae	แพร่	North
Sop Tia	สบเตี๊ยะ	Chom Thong	จอมทอง	Chiang Mai	เชียงใหม่	North
Sop Tui	สบตุ๋ย	Mueang Lampang	เมืองลำปาง	Lampang	ลำปาง	North
Soppong	สบป่อง	Pang Mapha	ปางมะผ้า	Mae Hong Son	แม่ฮ่องสอน	North
Sothon	โสธร	Mueang Chachoengsao	เมืองฉะเชิงเทรา	Chachoengsao	ฉะเชิงเทรา	East
Sri Phirom	ศรีภิรมย์	Phrom Phiram	พรหมพิราม	Phitsanulok	พิษณุโลก	Central
Su-ngai Kolok	สุไหงโก-ลก	Su-ngai Kolok (Malay: Sungai Golok)	สุไหงโก-ลก	Narathiwat	นราธิวาส	South
Su-ngai Padi	สุไหงปาดี	Su-ngai Padi (Malay: Sungai Padi)	สุไหงปาดี	Narathiwat	นราธิวาส	South
Suan Chik	สวนจิก	Si Somdet	ศรีสมเด็จ	Roi Et	ร้อยเอ็ด	North-East
Suan Chitlada	สวนจิตรลดา	Khet Dusit	ดุสิต	Bangkok	กรุงเทพมหานคร	Central
Suan Dok	สวนดอก	Mueang Lampang	เมืองลำปาง	Lampang	ลำปาง	North
Suan Dok Mai	สวนดอกไม้	Sao Hai	เสาไห้	Saraburi	สระบุรี	Central
Suan Khan	สวนขัน	Chang Klang	ช้างกลาง	Nakhon Si Thammarat	นครศรีธรรมราช	South
Suan Khuean	สวนเขื่อน	Mueang Phrae	เมืองแพร่	Phrae	แพร่	North
Suan Kluai	สวนกล้วย	Kantharalak	กันทรลักษ์	Sisaket	ศรีสะเกษ	North-East
Suan Kluai	สวนกล้วย	Ban Pong	บ้านโป่ง	Ratchaburi	ราชบุรี	West
Suan Luang	สวนหลวง	Khet Suan Luang	สวนหลวง	Bangkok	กรุงเทพมหานคร	Central
Suan Luang	สวนหลวง	Amphawa	อัมพวา	Samut Songkhram	สมุทรสงคราม	Central
Suan Luang	สวนหลวง	Chaloem Phra Kiat	เฉลิมพระเกียรติ	Nakhon Si Thammarat	นครศรีธรรมราช	South
Suan Luang	สวนหลวง	Krathum Baen	กระทุ่มแบน	Samut Sakhon	สมุทรสาคร	Central
Suan Miang	สวนเมี่ยง	Chat Trakan	ชาติตระการ	Phitsanulok	พิษณุโลก	Central
Suan Mon	สวนหม่อน	Mancha Khiri	มัญจาคีรี	Khon Kaen	ขอนแก่น	North-East
Suan Pan	สวนป่าน	Mueang Nakhon Pathom	เมืองนครปฐม	Nakhon Phanom	นครพนม	North-East
Suan Phrik	สวนพริก	Phra Nakhon Si Ayutthaya	พระนครศรีอยุธยา	Phra Nakhon Si Ayutthaya	พระนครศรีอยุธยา	Central
Suan Phrik Thai	สวนพริกไทย	Mueang Pathum Thani	เมืองปทุมธา	Pathum Thani	ปทุมธานี	Central
Suan Phueng	สวนผึ้ง	Suan Phueng	สวนผึ้ง	Ratchaburi	ราชบุรี	West
Suan Som	สวนส้ม	Ban Phaeo	บ้านแพ้ว	Samut Sakhon	สมุทรสาคร	Central
Suan Taeng	สวนแตง	Mueang Suphanburi	เมืองสุพรรณบุรี	Suphan Buri	สุพรรณบุรี	Central
Suan Taeng	สวนแตง	Lamae	ละแม	Chumphon	ชุมพร	South
Suan Yai	สวนใหญ่	Mueang Nonthaburi	เมืองนนทบุรี	Nonthaburi	นนทบุรี	Central
Suea Hok	เสือโฮก	Mueang Chai Nat	เมืองชัยนาท	Chai Nat	ชัยนาท	Central
Suea Hueng	เสือหึง	Chian Yai	เชียรใหญ่	Nakhon Si Thammarat	นครศรีธรรมราช	South
Suea Kok	เสือโก้ก	Wapi Pathum	วาปีปทุม	Maha Sarakham	มหาสารคาม	North-East
Suea Thao	เสือเฒ่า	Chiang Yuen	เชียงยืน	Maha Sarakham	มหาสารคาม	North-East
Sueang Khao	เสื่องข้าว	Si Rattana	ศรีรัตนะ	Sisaket	ศรีสะเกษ	North-East
Sueng	ซึ้ง	Khlung	ขลุง	Chanthaburi	จันทบุรี	East
Suk Duean Ha	สุขเดือนห้า	Noen Kham	เนินขาม	Chai Nat	ชัยนาท	Central
Suk Kasem	สุขเกษม	Pak Thong Chai	ปักธงชัย	Nakhon Ratchasima	นครราชสีมา	North-East
Suk Phaibun	สุขไพบูลย์	Soeng Sang	เสิงสาง	Nakhon Ratchasima	นครราชสีมา	North-East
Suk Ruethai	สุขฤทัย	Huai Khot	ห้วยคด	Uthai Thani	อุทัยธานี	Central
Suk Samran	สุขสำราญ	Tak Fa	ตากฟ้า	Nakhon Sawan	นครสวรรค์	Central
Suk Sawat	สุขสวัสดิ์	Phrai Bueng	ไพรบึง	Sisaket	ศรีสะเกษ	North-East
Sukhirin	สุคิริน	Sukhirin	สุคิริน	Narathiwat	นราธิวาส	South
Sum Sao	สุมเส้า	Phen	เพ็ญ	Udon Thani	อุดรธานี	North-East
Sung Men	สูงเม่น	Sung Men	สูงเม่น	Phrae	แพร่	North
Sung Noen	สูงเนิน	Sung Noen	สูงเนิน	Nakhon Ratchasima	นครราชสีมา	North-East
Sung Noen	สูงเนิน	Krasang	กระสัง	Buriram	บุรีรัมย์	North-East
Suranari	สุรนารี	Mueang Nakhon Ratchasima	เมืองนครราชสีมา	Nakhon Ratchasima	นครราชสีมา	North-East
Surasak	สุรศักดิ์	Si Racha	ศรีราชา	Chonburi	ชลบุรี	East
Suriyawong	สุริยวงศ์	Khet Bang Rak	บางรัก	Bangkok	กรุงเทพมหานคร	Central
Suso	สุโสะ	Palian	ปะเหลียน	Trang	ตรัง	South
Suthep	สุเทพ	Mueang Chiang Mai	เมืองเชียงใหม่	Chiang Mai	เชียงใหม่	North
Suwannakham	สุวรรณคาม	Nikhom Nam Un	นิคมน้ำอูน	Sakon Nakhon	สกลนคร	North-East
Suwannakhuha	สุวรรณคูหา	Suwannakhuha	สุวรรณคูหา	Nong Bua Lamphu	หนองบัวลำภู	North-East
Suwari	สุวารี	Rueso (Malay: Rusa)	รือเสาะ	Narathiwat	นราธิวาส	South

== See also ==
- Organization of the government of Thailand
- List of districts of Thailand
- List of districts of Bangkok
- List of tambon in Thailand
- Provinces of Thailand
- List of municipalities in Thailand
