= San Klang =

San Klang may refer to several places in Thailand:

- San Klang, Phan
- San Klang, San Kamphaeng
- San Klang, San Pa Tong
