= Song Khwae =

Song Khwae may refer to:

- Song Khwae, Doi Lo is a subdistrict (tambon) of Doi Lo District, in Chiang Mai Province, Thailand.
- Song Khwae District is a district (Amphoe) in the northwestern part of Nan Province, northern Thailand.
