= Santi Suk =

Santi Suk may refer to:

- Santi Suk, Chiang Mai
- Santi Suk, Chiang Rai
