= Doi Lo =

Coordinates: 18°28′N 98°47′E

Doi Lo ดอยหล่อ
- Tambon
- Interactive map of Doi Lo
- Country: Thailand
- Province: Chiang Mai
- District: Doi Lo

Population (2015)
  - Total: 12,261
- Time zone: UTC+7 (ICT)
- Postal code: 50160
- TIS 1099: 502401

Doi Lo (Thai: ดอยหล่อ) is a tambon (subdistrict) of Doi Lo District, in Chiang Mai Province, Thailand. In 2015, it had a population of 12,261 people.

== History ==
The subdistrict was created 1 August 1979 by splitting off eight administrative villages from Song Khwae.

== Administration ==
=== Central administration ===
The tambon is divided into 26 administrative villages (mubans).

No.	Name	Thai
1.	Ban San Hin	บ้านสันหิน
2.	Ban Lao Puai	บ้านเหล่าป๋วย
3.	Ban Lao Pao	บ้านเหล่าเป้า
4.	Ban Pak Thang Charoen	บ้านปากทางเจริญ
5.	Ban Huai Cho	บ้านห้วยโจ้
6.	Ban Doi Lo	บ้านดอยหล่อ
7.	Ban Wang Kham Pom	บ้านวังขามป้อม
8.	Ban Dong Pa Wai	บ้านดงป่าหวาย
9.	Ban Pak Thang Samakkhi	บ้านปากทางสามัคคี
10.	Ban Tha Chok	บ้านท่าโชค
11.	Ban Doi Noi	บ้านดอยน้อย
12.	Ban Huai Thang	บ้านห้วยทัง
13.	Ban Sirimang Khla Chan	บ้านสิริมังคลาจารย์
14.	Ban Lang Mon	บ้านหลังม่อน
15.	Ban Huai Pao Yong	บ้านห้วยเปายง
16.	Ban Rai Sawang Arom	บ้านไร่สว่างอารมณ์
17.	Ban Mai Phatthana	บ้านใหม่พัฒนา
18.	Ban Thok Suea	บ้านโทกเสือ
19.	Ban Tha Lo	บ้านท่าล้อ
20.	Ban Huai Sai	บ้านห้วยทราย
21.	Ban Rai Phatthana	บ้านไร่พัฒนา
22.	Ban Wang Than Thong	บ้านวังธารทอง
23.	Ban Rai Bon	บ้านไร่บน
24.	Ban Don Chuen	บ้านดอนชื่น
25.	Ban Wiang Thong	บ้านเวียงทอง
26.	Ban Rai Buak Bong	บ้านไร่บวกบง

=== Local administration ===
The subdistrict is covered by the subdistrict administrative organization (SAO) Doi Lo (องค์การบริหารส่วนตำบลดอยหล่อ).
