= Lamduan district =

Lamduan ลำดวน
- District
- District location in Surin province
- Coordinates: 14°43′38″N 103°40′33″E
- Country: Thailand
- Province: Surin
- Seat: Lamduan

Area
  - Total: 301.0 km^{2} (116.2 sq mi)

Population (2005)
  - Total: 30,059
  - Density: 99.9/km^{2} (259/sq mi)
- Time zone: UTC+7 (ICT)
- Postal code: 32220
- Geocode: 3211

Lamduan (Thai: ลำดวน, pronounced [lām.dūa̯n]) is a district (amphoe) in the central part of Surin province, northeastern Thailand.

== History ==
The district dates back to the Mueang Suraphinthanikhom (สุรพินทนิคม), which was established in 1871. In 1896 it was converted into the district Lamduan, which was later dissolved.

On 3 January 1977 it was reestablished as a minor district (king amphoe) by splitting off the two tambons, Lamduan and Chok Nuea, from Sangkha district. It was upgraded to a full district on 19 July 1991.

== Geography ==
Neighboring districts are (from the north clockwise): Sikhoraphum, Si Narong, Sangkha, Prasat and Mueang Surin.

== Administration ==
The district is divided into five sub-districts (tambons), which are further subdivided into 51 villages (mubans). Lamduan Sunphin is a township (thesaban tambon) which covers parts of tambon Lamduan. There are a further five tambon administrative organizations (TAO).

No.	Name	Thai name	Villages	Pop.
1.	Lamduan	ลำดวน	11	7,791
2.	Chok Nuea	โชคเหนือ	9	4,665
3.	U Lok	อู่โลก	11	5,386
4.	Tram Dom	ตรำดม	10	5,719
5.	Tapiang Tia	ตระเปียงเตีย	10	6,498
