= A Phon =

Subdistrict in Surin Province

A Phon อาโพน
- Subdistrict
- A Phon (Thailand)
- Interactive map of A Phon
- Country: Thailand
- Province: Surin
- District: Buachet

Population (2005)
  - Total: 6,365
- Time zone: UTC+7 (ICT)

A Phon (Thai: อาโพน), is a tambon (subdistrict) of Buachet District, Surin Province, Thailand. In 2005, it had a population of 7,100 people.

== Administration ==
The tambon is divided into eleven administrative villages (mubans).

No.	Name	Thai	Population
1.	A Phon	อาโพน	423
2.	Pramae	ประเม	479
3.	Cham Pa To	ชำปะโต	641
4.	Nong Luang	หนองหลวง	360
5.	Jarn	จารย์	500
6.	Sa Rae	สะแร	320
7.	Ruun	รุน	366
8.	Khok Sa-at	โคกสะอาด	214
9.	Kraisorn Pattana	ไกรสรพัฒนา	338
10.	Phak Mai	ผักไหม	354
11.	Pho Yai	โพธิ์ใหญ่	460
