= Si subdistrict =

Tambon in Si Sa Ket Province, Thailand

Si สิ
- Tambon
- Interactive map of Si
- Coordinates: 14°37′8.4″N 104°26′5.6″E
- Country: Thailand
- Province: Si Sa Ket
- Amphoe: Khun Han

Population (2017)
  - Total: 11,476
- Time zone: UTC+7 (ICT)
- Postal code: 33150
- TIS 1099: 330801

Si (Thai: สิ, pronounced [sìʔ]) is a tambon (subdistrict) of Khun Han District, in Si Sa Ket Province, Thailand. In 2017 it had a total population of 11,476 people.

== Administration ==
=== Central administration ===
The tambon is subdivided into 14 administrative villages (muban).

| No. | Name | Thai |
|---|---|---|
| 1. | Ban Si | บ้านสิ |
| 2. | Ban Krathing | บ้านกระทิง |
| 3. | Ban Nong Khaen | บ้านหนองแคน |
| 4. | Ban Non Sawang | บ้านโนนสว่าง |
| 5. | Ban Siwalai | บ้านศิวาลัย |
| 6. | Ban Si Khun Han | บ้านศรีขุนหาญ |
| 7. | Ban Huai | บ้านห้วย |
| 8. | Ban Nong Laeng | บ้านหนองแล้ง |
| 9. | Ban Non | บ้านโนน |
| 10. | Ban Mai Phatthana | บ้านใหม่พัฒนา |
| 11. | Ban Non Si Thong | บ้านโนนศรีทอง |
| 12. | Ban Siri Khun Han | บ้านสิริขุนหาญ |
| 13. | Ban Siwarak | บ้านศิวารักษ์ |
| 14. | Ban Sala | บ้านศาลา |

=== Local administration ===
The area of the subdistrict is shared by 2 local governments.

- the subdistrict municipality (Thesaban Tambon) Khun Han (เทศบาลตำบลขุนหาญ)
- the subdistrict municipality (Thesaban Tambon) Si (เทศบาลตำบลสิ)

== See also ==
- List of short place names
