= Phayu district =

Phayu พยุห์
- District
- District location in Sisaket province
- Coordinates: 14°54′12″N 104°23′30″E
- Country: Thailand
- Province: Sisaket
- Seat: Phayu

Area
  - Total: 225.485 km^{2} (87.060 sq mi)

Population (2005)
  - Total: 36,325
  - Density: 161.1/km^{2} (417/sq mi)
- Time zone: ICT
- Postal code: 33230
- Geocode: 3320

Phayu (Thai: พยุห์, pronounced [pʰā.júʔ]) is a district (amphoe) in the central part of Sisaket province, northeastern Thailand.

== History ==
The minor district (king amphoe) was created on 30 April 1994, when five tambons were split off from Mueang Sisaket district. On 11 October 1997 it was upgraded to a full district.

== Geography ==
Neighboring districts are (from the north clockwise): Mueang Sisaket, Nam Kliang, Si Rattana, Phrai Bueng, and Wang Hin.

== Administration ==
The district is divided into five sub-districts (tambons), which are further subdivided into 65 villages (mubans). Phayu is a township (thesaban tambon) which covers parts of tambon Phayu. There are a further five tambon administrative organizations (TAO).

No.	Name	Thai name	Villages	Pop.
1.	Phayu	พยุห์	12	9,002
2.	Phrom Sawat	พรหมสวัสดิ์	20	9,457
3.	Tamyae	ตำแย	15	7,718
4.	Non Phek	โนนเพ็ก	11	6,109
5.	Nong Kha	หนองค้า	7	4,039
