= Phu Sing district =

Phu Sing ภูสิงห์
- District
- Amphoe location in Sisaket province
- Coordinates: 14°32′48″N 104°7′54″E
- Country: Thailand
- Province: Sisaket
- Seat: Huai Tuekchu

Area
  - Total: 940.1 km^{2} (363.0 sq mi)

Population (2005)
  - Total: 50,585
  - Density: 53.8/km^{2} (139/sq mi)
- Time zone: UTC+7 (ICT)
- Postal code: 33140
- Geocode: 3317

Phu Sing (Thai: ภูสิงห์, pronounced [pʰūː sǐŋ]) is a district (amphoe) in the southwestern part of Sisaket province, northeastern Thailand.

== History ==
The minor district (king amphoe) was created on 1 April 1991, when the six tambons Khok Tan, Huai Ta Mon, Huai Tuekchu, Lalom, Takhian Ram, and Dong Rak were split off from Khunkhan district. It was upgraded to a full district on 8 September 1995.

== Geography ==
The district is bounded in the south by the Dangrek Range. Neighboring districts are (from the west clockwise): Buachet of Surin province, Khukhan, and Khun Han of Sisaket Province, and Oddar Meancheay of Cambodia.

== Administration ==
The district is divided into seven sub-districts (tambons), which are further subdivided into 85 villages (mubans). There are no municipal (thesaban) areas, and seven tambon administrative organizations (TAO).

No.	Name	Thai name	Villages	Pop.
1.	Khok Tan	โคกตาล	13	7,324
2.	Huai Ta Mon	ห้วยตามอญ	10	6,212
3.	Huai Tuekchu	ห้วยตึ๊กชู	18	11,313
4.	Lalom	ละลม	13	7,554
5.	Takhian Ram	ตะเคียนราม	14	5,928
6.	Dong Rak	ดงรัก	8	5,770
7.	Phrai Phatthana	ไพรพัฒนา	9	6,484
