= Benchalak district =

Benchalak เบญจลักษ์
- District
- District location in Sisaket province
- Coordinates: 14°47′42″N 104°40′12″E
- Country: Thailand
- Province: Sisaket
- Seat: Siao

Area
  - Total: 331.3 km^{2} (127.9 sq mi)

Population (2005)
  - Total: 35,807
  - Density: 108.1/km^{2} (280/sq mi)
- Time zone: UTC+7 (ICT)
- Postal code: 33110
- Geocode: 3319

Benchalak (Thai: เบญจลักษ์, pronounced [bēn.t͡ɕā.lák]) is a district (amphoe) of Sisaket province, northeastern Thailand.

== History ==
The minor district (king amphoe) was created on 31 May 1993, when five tambons were split off from Kantharalak district. It was upgraded to a full district on 5 December 1996.

== Geography ==
Neighboring districts are (from the south clockwise): Kantharalak, Si Rattana, Nam Kliang, and Non Khun of Sisaket Province; Det Udom and Thung Si Udom of Ubon Ratchathani province.

== Administration ==
The district is divided into five sub-districts (tambons), which are further subdivided into 64 villages (mubans). There are no municipal (thesaban) areas. There are five tambon administrative organizations (TAO).

No.	Name	Thai name	Villages	Pop.
1.	Siao	เสียว	14	7,469
2.	Nong Wa	หนองหว้า	15	7,395
3.	Nong Ngu Lueam	หนองงูเหลือม	12	7,059
4.	Nong Hang	หนองฮาง	12	6,739
5.	Tha Khlo	ท่าคล้อ	11	7,145
