= Prue Yai =

Prue Yai is a sub-district of Khukhan District, Sisaket Province. Its name means "Great Forest" because in the past, this area was the great forest before.

== History ==
- 1907 Prue Yai was a sub-district of Huai Nuea District (Khukhan District), Khukhan Provine (Sisaket Province)
- 1986 Na Lawia Village and Sawai Pheng Village were divided from Prue Yai in order to establish Nikhom Phatthana Sub-district and Khok Tan Sub-district was divided from Prue Yai.
- 1988 Takhian Ram Sub-district was divided from Prue Yai
- 1990 Dong Rak Sub-district was divided from Khok Tan

== Administration ==
The sub-district is divided into 20 villages (Muban), arranging by village number (Mu) as follows:

- Mu 1 Prue Yai
- Mu 2 Lak
- Mu 3 Ta Bo
- Mu 4 Makham
- Mu 5 Prue Khan Tawan-ok
- Mu 6 Non Sombun
- Mu 7 Prue Khan Tawantok
- Mu 8 Pho Sawang
- Mu 9 Khlong Lamchiak
- Mu 10 Ket Na Kho
- Mu 11 Noen Saeng
- Mu 12 Saen Suk
- Mu 13 Na Charia
- Mu 14 Prue Khan Tai
- Mu 15 Bang Krawan
- Mu 16 Nong Asen
- Mu 17 Thung Chai
- Mu 18 Noen Seri
- Mu 19 Nong Sim
- Mu 20 Na Kho

== Public health ==
- Prue Yai Health Promoting Hospital
- Prue Khan Health Promoting Hospital
- Tabtim Siam 06 Health Promoting Hospital

== Education ==
- Primary
  - Prue Khan School
  - Makham School
  - Lak School
  - Non Sombun School
  - Tabtim Siam 06 School
- Primary and middle
  - Prue Yai School
- Middle and High
  - Prue Yai Witthayabanlang School

== Religion ==
People are mostly Theravada Buddhists, there are seven temples in the sub-district

- Maha Nikaya
  - Prue Khan Temple (The temple of Khukhan district monk dean)
  - Prue Yai Temple (The temple of Phu Sing district monk dean)
  - Ta Bo Ket Mongkhon Temple
  - Pho Sawang Temple
  - Non Sombun Temple
- Dhammayuttika Nikaya
  - Sa Phong Cave Temple
  - Pa Mamuang Temple without royal bound Buddhist stone (leave)

== Tourist attractions ==
- Tabtim Siam 06 Royal Project
- Chulabhorn Wildlife Breeding Center
- Sa Phong Cave Temple
- Morakot Cliff
