= Huai Nuea =

Sub-district in Sisaket Province, Thailand

Huai Nuea is a sub-district of Khukhan District, Sisaket Province in Thailand. This sub-district is the administrative, economic, educational and religious center of Khukhan district.

== History ==
- 1907 Huai Nuea was a sub-district of Huai Nuea District (Khukhan District currently), Khukhan Province (Sisaket Province currently)
- 1972 Huai Tai Sub-district was divided from Huai Nuea
- 1986 Nikhom Soi 2 Village was divided from Huai Nuea in order to establish Nikhom Phatthana Sub-district
- 1989 Huai Samran Sub-district was divided from Huai Nuea

== Administration ==
The sub-district is divided into 11 villages (Muban), arranging by village number (Mu) as follows:

Mu	Name	Thai name	Meaning
2	Ban Sanuan	บ้านสนวน	-
3	Ban Hat-Trae	บ้านหาด-แตระ	-
4	Ban Phran	บ้านพราน	Hunter Village
5	Ban Riam	บ้านเรียม	-
7	Ban Chek	บ้านเจ๊ก	Chinese Village
8	Ban Tabek	บ้านตะแบก	-
9	Ban Chamrae Tawan Tok	บ้านชำแระตะวันตก	West Chamrae Village
10	Ban Chamrae Klang	บ้านชำแระกลาง	Central Chamrae Village
11	Ban Chamrae Nuea	บ้านชำแระเหนือ	North Chamrae Village
12	Ban Sa-ang	บ้านสะอาง	-
13	Ban Bok	บ้านบก	-

== Public health ==
- Huai Nuea Township Health Promoting Center

== Education ==
- Government School
  - Primary
    - Wat Khian School
    - Riam School
    - Sa-ang (Pracha Samakkhi) School
    - Anuban Si Prachanukun School
  - Primary and Middle
    - Chamrae Klang School
    - Khukhan Witthaya School
  - Middle and High
    - Khukhan School
- Private School
  - Primary, Middle and High
    - Khukhan Rad Bumrung School
  - Vocational
    - Rak Thai Khukhan Technology and Business College

== Religion ==
- Klang Khukhan Temple (Temple of Phra Rat Pariyatyathon, the adviser of Sisaket provincial monk dean)
- Khian Burapharam Temple
- Chek Phophruek Temple
- Thai Thepnimit Temple
- Bok Chan Nakhon Temple
- Sa-ang Phothi-yan Temple
- Chamrae Si Sudaram Temple
