= Santi Suk, Chiang Mai =

Coordinates: 18.5290°N 98.8206°E

Santi Suk สันติสุข
- Tambon
- Interactive map of Santi Suk
- Country: Thailand
- Province: Chiang Mai
- District: Doi Lo

Population (2015)
  - Total: 3,852
- Time zone: UTC+7 (ICT)
- Postal code: 50160
- TIS 1099: 502404

Santi Suk (Thai: สันติสุข) is a tambon (subdistrict) of Doi Lo District, in Chiang Mai Province, Thailand. In 2015 it had a population of 3,852 people.

== History ==
The subdistrict was created effective 1 May 1991 by splitting off eight administrative villages from Yang Khram.

== Administration ==
=== Central administration ===
The tambon is divided into nine administrative villages (mubans).

No.	Name	Thai
1.	Ban San Makha	บ้านสันมะค่า
2.	Ban Nong Hiang	บ้านหนองเหียง
3.	Ban Thung Pui	บ้านทุ่งปุย
4.	Ban Sop Ao	บ้านสบอาว
5.	Ban San Nok Kaeo	บ้านสันนกแก้ว
6.	Ban Mai Nong Hoi	บ้านใหม่หนองหอย
7.	Ban Nong Hoi	บ้านหนองหอย
8.	Ban Mae Taeng	บ้านแม่แตง
9.	Ban Santi Suk	บ้านสันติสุข

=== Local administration ===
The subdistrict is covered by the subdistrict municipality (thesaban tambon) Santi Suk (เทศบาลตำบลสันติสุข).
