= Thung Ngam =

Coordinates: 18.4281°N 99.0383°E

Thung Ngam ทุ่งงาม
- Tambon
- Interactive map of Thung Ngam
- Country: Thailand
- Province: Lampang
- Amphoe: Soem Ngam District

Population (2005)
  - Total: 8,191
- Time zone: UTC+7 (Thailand)

Thung Ngam (Thai: ทุ่งงาม) is a village and tambon (subdistrict) of Soem Ngam District, in Lampang Province, Thailand. In 2005 it had a total population of 8191 people. The tambon contains 11 villages.
