= Wang Hin district =

Wang Hin วังหิน
- District
- District location in Sisaket province
- Coordinates: 14°56′54″N 104°13′48″E
- Country: Thailand
- Province: Sisaket
- Seat: Bu Sung

Area
  - Total: 237.619 km^{2} (91.745 sq mi)

Population (2005)
  - Total: 46,888
  - Density: 197.3/km^{2} (511/sq mi)
- Time zone: UTC+7 (ICT)
- Postal code: 33270
- Geocode: 3316

Wang Hin (Thai: วังหิน, pronounced [wāŋ hǐn]) is a district (amphoe) in the central part of Sisaket province, northeastern Thailand.

== Geography ==
Neighboring districts are (from the north clockwise): Mueang Sisaket, Phayu, Phrai Bueng, Khukhan, Prang Ku, and Uthumphon Phisai.

== History ==
The minor district (king amphoe) was created on 9 March 1987, when the five tambons, Bu Sung, That, Duan Yai, Bo Kaeo, and Si Samran were split off from Mueang Sisaket district. It was upgraded to a full district on 20 October 1993.

== Administration ==
The district is divided into eight sub-districts (tambons), which are further subdivided into 126 villages (mubans). Bu Sung is a sub-district municipality (thesaban tambon) which covers the same-named sub-district and seven tambon administrative organizations (TAO).

No.	Name	Thai name	Villages	Pop.
1.	Bu Sung	บุสูง	22	9,676
2.	That	ธาตุ	16	6,614
3.	Duan Yai	ดวนใหญ่	18	7,139
4.	Bo Kaeo	บ่อแก้ว	19	5,388
5.	Si Samran	ศรีสำราญ	13	4,088
6.	Thung Sawang	ทุ่งสว่าง	15	4,440
7.	Wang Hin	วังหิน	11	4,399
8.	Phon Yang	โพนยาง	12	5,144
