= Buachet district =

Buachet บัวเชด
- District
- District location in Surin province
- Coordinates: 14°31′36″N 103°56′42″E
- Country: Thailand
- Province: Surin
- Seat: Buachet

Area
  - Total: 479.0 km^{2} (184.9 sq mi)

Population (2005)
  - Total: 37,877
  - Density: 79.1/km^{2} (205/sq mi)
- Time zone: UTC+7 (ICT)
- Postal code: 32230
- Geocode: 3213

Buachet (Thai: บัวเชด, pronounced [būa̯.t͡ɕʰêːt]) is a district (amphoe) in the southeastern part of Surin province, northeastern Thailand.

== History ==
The minor district (king amphoe) Buachet was created on 21 August 1978 when the three tambons, Buachet, Sadao, and Charat, were split off from Sangkha district. At first a temporary district office was established at the base of the Patrol Police group of the area. It became a full district on 27 July 1984.

== Geography ==
The southern part of this district is in the Dângrêk Mountains.

Neighboring districts are (from the west clockwise) Sangkha of Surin Province, Khukhan, Phu Sing of Sisaket province, and Oddar Meancheay of Cambodia.

== Administration ==
The district is divided into six sub-districts (tambons), which are further subdivided into 67 villages (mubans). Buachet itself has township (thesaban tambon) status and covers parts of the tambon Buachet. There are in addition six tambon administrative organizations (TAO).

No.	Name	Thai name	Villages	Pop.
1.	Buachet	บัวเชด	130	8,972
2.	Sadao	สะเดา	120	5,780
3.	Charat	จรัส	140	6,300
4.	Ta Wang	ตาวัง	150	5,878
5.	A Phon	อาโพน	160	6,365
6.	Samphao Lun	สำเภาลูน	170	4,582
