= Soem Sai =

Soem Sai เสริมซ้าย
- Tambon
- Country: Thailand
- Province: Lampang
- Amphoe: Soem Ngam District

Population (2005)
  - Total: 8,492
- Time zone: UTC+7 (Thailand)

Soem Sai (Thai: เสริมซ้าย) is a village and tambon (subdistrict) of Soem Ngam District, in Lampang Province, Thailand. In 2005 it had a total population of 8492 people. The tambon contains 10 villages.
