= Soem Ngam district =

Soem Ngam เสริมงาม
- District
- District location in Lampang province
- Coordinates: 18°3′55″N 99°14′50″E
- Country: Thailand
- Province: Lampang
- Seat: Thung Ngam

Area
  - Total: 631.727 km^{2} (243.911 sq mi)

Population (2005)
  - Total: 32,714
  - Density: 51.8/km^{2} (134/sq mi)
- Time zone: UTC+7 (ICT)
- Postal code: 52130
- Geocode: 5204

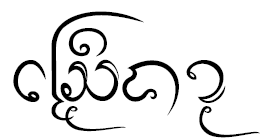
Soem Ngam (Thai: เสริมงาม, pronounced [sɤ̌ːm ŋāːm]; Northern Thai: ) is a district (amphoe) in the western part of Lampang province, northern Thailand.

== Geography ==
Neighboring districts are (from the northeast clockwise): Hang Chat, Ko Kha, Sop Prap, Thoen of Lampang Province, Thung Hua Chang and Mae Tha of Lamphun province.

The Khun Tan Range stretches from north to south along the district.

== History ==
Soem Ngam was established as a minor district (king amphoe) on 16 August 1971 by splitting off tambons Thung Ngam, Soem Khwa, and Soem Sai from Ko Ka District. The minor district was upgraded to a full district on 21 August 1975.

== Administration ==
The district is divided into four subdistricts (tambons), which are further subdivided into 42 villages (mubans). Soem Ngam is a subdistrict municipality (thesaban tambon) which covers parts of tambons Thung Ngam, Soem Sai, and Soem Klang. There are a further four tambon administrative organizations (TAO).

No.	Name	Thai	Villages	Pop.
1.	Thung Ngam	ทุ่งงาม	11	8,211
2.	Soem Khwa	เสริมขวา	12	7,344
3.	Soem Sai	เสริมซ้าย	10	8,347
4.	Soem Klang	เสริมกลาง	9	8,366
