= Mueang Sisaket district =

Mueang Sisaket เมืองศรีสะเกษ
- District
- District location in Sisaket province
- Coordinates: 15°7′14″N 104°19′20″E
- Country: Thailand
- Province: Sisaket
- Seat: Mueang Nuea

Area
  - Total: 576.366 km^{2} (222.536 sq mi)

Population (2009)
  - Total: 135,512
  - Density: 233.9/km^{2} (606/sq mi)
- Time zone: UTC+7 (ICT)
- Postal code: 33000
- Geocode: 3301

Mueang Sisaket (Thai: เมืองศรีสะเกษ, RTGS: Mueang Si Sa Ket, pronounced [mɯ̄a̯ŋ sǐː sàʔ kèːt]) is the capital district (amphoe mueang) of Sisaket Province, northeastern Thailand.

== History ==
The district was renamed from Klang Si Sa Ket (กลางศีร์ษะเกษ) to Mueang Sisaket in 1913. In 1917 mueang was removed from the name, which was added again in 1938.

== Geography ==
Neighboring districts are (from the north clockwise) Yang Chum Noi, Kanthararom, Nam Kliang, Phayu, Wang Hin, Uthumphon Phisai and Rasi Salai.

== Administration ==
The district is divided into 18 sub-districts (tambons), which are further subdivided into 166 villages (mubans). The town (thesaban mueang) Sisaket covers tambons Mueang Nuea and Mueang Tai and parts of tambon Nong Khrok, Phon Kha, Ya Plong, and Pho. Nam Kham is a subdistrict municipality (thesaban tambon) which covers the whole same-named subdistrict. There are a further 15 tambon administrative organizations (TAO).

| No. | Name | Thai | Villages | Pop. |
|---|---|---|---|---|
| 1. | Mueang Nuea | เมืองเหนือ | - | 8,631 |
| 2. | Mueang Tai | เมืองใต้ | - | 10,346 |
| 3. | Khu Sot | คูซอด | 10 | 4,889 |
| 4. | Sam | ซำ | 14 | 6,810 |
| 5. | Chan | จาน | 12 | 6,857 |
| 6. | Tadop | ตะดอบ | 8 | 6,495 |
| 7. | Nong Khrok | หนองครก | 9 | 15,015 |
| 11. | Phon Kha | โพนข่า | 10 | 6,729 |
| 12. | Phon Kho | โพนค้อ | 6 | 2,899 |
| 15. | Phon Khwao | โพนเขวา | 11 | 7,648 |
| 16. | Ya Plong | หญ้าปล้อง | 8 | 7,733 |
| 18. | Thum | ทุ่ม | 13 | 6,928 |
| 19. | Nong Hai | หนองไฮ | 7 | 3,778 |
| 21. | Nong Kaeo | หนองแก้ว | 12 | 6,439 |
| 22. | Nam Kham | น้ำคำ | 15 | 10,136 |
| 23. | Pho | โพธิ์ | 10 | 13,526 |
| 24. | Mak Khiap | หมากเขียบ | 11 | 4,871 |
| 27. | Nong Phai | หนองไผ่ | 10 | 5,782 |

Missing numbers are tambons which now form the districts Wang Hin and Phayu.
