= Khukhan district =

Khukhan ขุขันธ์
- Amphoe
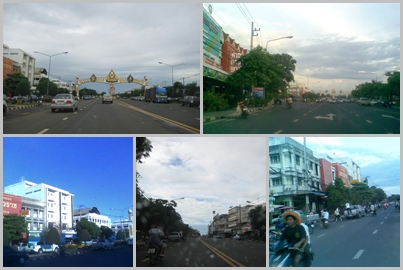
- Khukhan

- Amphoe location in Sisaket province
- Coordinates: 14°42′48″N 104°11′54″E
- Country: Thailand
- Province: Sisaket

Area
  - Total: 914.309 km^{2} (353.017 sq mi)

Population (2010)
  - Total: 148,066
  - Density: 161.943/km^{2} (419.43/sq mi)
- Time zone: UTC+7 (ICT)
- Postal code: 33140
- Geocode: 3305

Khukhan (Thai: ขุขันธ์, pronounced [kʰùʔ.kʰǎn]) is a district (Amphoe) of Sisaket province, northeastern Thailand.

== Geography ==
Neighboring districts are (clockwise, from the north) Prang Ku, Wang Hin, Phrai Bueng, Khun Han, and Phu Sing of Sisaket Province, and Buachet, Sangkha, and Si Narong of Surin Province.

Prior to the re-organization of Thailand for administrative and logistical reasons circa 1945, Khukhan was the provincial capital and is still recognized as the historical center of Sisaket. The reorganization may have been justified in order to connect all the provincial capitals of the lower northeast by the rail line that runs east-west between Korat and Ubon. Khukhan is 48 kilometres south of that line.)

== History ==
Today, Khukhan is the second most populous district in the province and has numerous roads connecting it to all parts of the province dating back to its earlier importance as the provincial capital. Several temples (wat, วัด) date to the earliest introduction of Buddhism in the area. According to local legend, a battle was fought north of the city c. 1400 which prompted the founding of Khukhan by royal decree.

== Administration ==
The district is divided into 22 sub-districts (tambon), further subdivided into 279 villages (muban). Mueang Khukhan is a sub-district municipality (thesaban tambon) which covers parts of the sub-district Huai Nuea. There are 22 Tambon administrative organizations (TAO).

No.	Name	Thai name	Villages	Pop.
1.	Kanthararom	กันทรารมย์	14	6,842
2.	Chakong	จะกง	13	6,209
3.	Chai Di	ใจดี	11	6,363
4.	Dong Kam Met	ดองกำเม็ด	11	7,179
5.	Sano	โสน	22	14,562
6.	Prue Yai	ปรือใหญ่	20	11,506
7.	Sadao Yai	สะเดาใหญ่	17	6,742
8.	Ta Ut	ตาอุด	9	5,142
9.	Huai Nuea	ห้วยเหนือ	14	12,151
10.	Huai Tai	ห้วยใต้	13	6,689
11.	Hua Suea	หัวเสือ	14	6,695
13.	Takhian	ตะเคียน	12	5,843
15.	Nikhom Phatthana	นิคมพัฒนา	11	4,272
17.	Khok Phet	โคกเพชร	11	5,532
18.	Prasat	ปราสาท	9	5,956
21.	Samrong Ta Chen	สำโรงตาเจ็น	17	6,122
22.	Huai Samran	ห้วยสำราญ	11	5,388
24.	Kritsana	กฤษณา	13	5,946
25.	Lom Sak	ลมศักดิ์	11	5,683
26.	Nong Chalong	หนองฉลอง	10	4,017
27.	Si Trakun	ศรีตระกูล	7	3,374
28.	Si Sa-at	ศรีสะอาด	9	4,193

Missing numbers are tambon which now form Phu Sing district.
