= Soem Khwa =

Soem Khwa เสริมขวา
- Tambon
- Country: Thailand
- Province: Lampang
- Amphoe: Soem Ngam District

Population (2005)
  - Total: 7,661
- Time zone: UTC+7 (Thailand)

Soem Khwa (Thai: เสริมขวา) is a village and tambon (subdistrict) of Soem Ngam District, in Lampang Province, Thailand. In 2005 it had a total population of 7661 people. The tambon contains 12 villages.
