= San Makhet =

San Makhet สันมะเค็ด
- Tambon
- Interactive map of San Makhet
- Coordinates: 19°36′37″N 99°50′42″E
- Country: Thailand
- Province: Chiang Rai
- Amphoe: Phan

Population (2018)
  - Total: 10,206
- Time zone: UTC+7 (TST)
- Postal code: 57120
- TIS 1099: 570501

San Makhet (Thai: สันมะเค็ด, pronounced [sǎn mā.kʰét]) is a tambon (subdistrict) of Phan District, in Chiang Rai Province, Thailand. In 2018 it had a total population of 10,206 people.

== History ==
The subdistrict was created effective August 1, 1970 by splitting off 10 administrative villages from Mae O.

== Administration ==
=== Central administration ===
The tambon is subdivided into 21 administrative villages (muban).

No.	Name	Thai
1.	Ban San Makhet	บ้านสันมะเค็ด
2.	Ban Kwao Thong	บ้านกว๋าวโท้ง
3.	Ban San Nakhon	บ้านสันนคร
4.	Ban San Ton Du	บ้านสันต้นดู่
5.	Ban Kluai	บ้านกล้วย
6.	Ban Huai Khruea Ba	บ้านห้วยเครือบ้า
7.	Ban Mai Tha Ruea	บ้านใหม่ท่าเรือ
8.	Ban Pa Daeng Ngam	บ้านป่าแดงงาม
9.	Ban Mai Nai	บ้านใหม่ใน
10.	Ban Pa Tueng Than Chai	บ้านป่าตึงทันใจ
11.	Ban Pha Lat Huai Luek	บ้านผาลาดห้วยลึก
12.	Ban Kluai Sai Ngam	บ้านกล้วยทรายงาม
13.	Ban Nong Pet	บ้านหนองเป็ด
14.	Ban Kluai Mai	บ้านกล้วยใหม่
15.	Ban San Takhian	บ้านสันตะเคียน
16.	Ban Kluai Mai Sai Thong	บ้านกล้วยใหม่ทรายทอง
17.	Ban Thung Thongkwao	บ้านทุ่งทองกวาว
18.	Ban San Pa Sak	บ้านสันป่าสัก
19.	Ban San Pa Sak Thong	บ้านสันป่าสักทอง
20.	Ban Si Nakhon	บ้านศรีนคร
21.	Ban Kluai Sai Ngoen	บ้านกล้วยทรายเงิน

=== Local administration ===
The whole area of the subdistrict is covered by the subdistrict municipality (Thesaban Tambon) San Makhet (เทศบาลตำบลสันมะเค็ด).
