= Kantharalak district =

Kantharalak กันทรลักษ์
- District
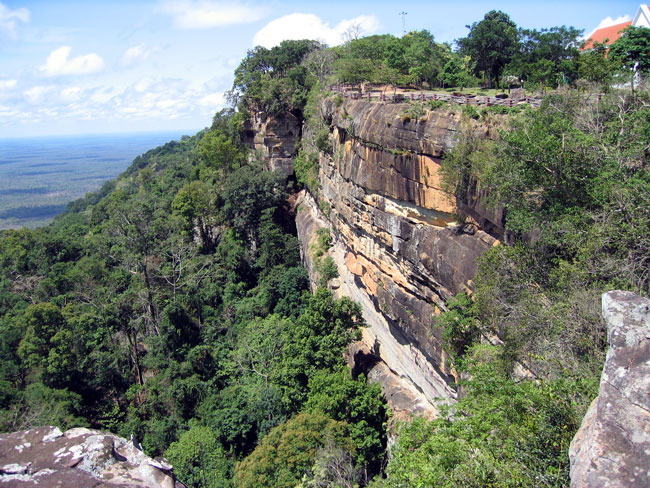
- Khao Phra Wihan National Park

- District location in Sisaket province
- Coordinates: 14°38′24″N 104°39′0″E
- Country: Thailand
- Province: Sisaket
- Seat: Nam Om

Area
  - Total: 1,236.6 km^{2} (477.5 sq mi)

Population (2014)
  - Total: 200,608
  - Density: 160.5/km^{2} (416/sq mi)
- Time zone: UTC+7 (ICT)
- Postal code: 33110
- Geocode: 3304

Kantharalak (Thai: กันทรลักษ์, pronounced [kān.tʰā.rā.lák]) is a district (amphoe) in the southeastern part of Sisaket province, northeastern Thailand.

== History ==
The old name of Kantharalak was Mueang Uthumphon Phisai, controlled by Mueang Khukhan. The central office was in Ban Kan Tuat, Tambon Uthumphon Phisai (not to be confused with latter-day Uthumphon Phisai district.) The present district office is in Tambon Nam Om.

In 1939 the district name was changed from Nam Om to Kantharalak.

== Etymology ==
The name Kantharalak means 'countless ravines', from Pali kandara ('ravine') and the Sanskrit lakṣa (लक्ष), 'a hundred thousand'.

== Geography ==
The district is defined in the south by the Dangrek Range. Neighboring districts are (from the west clockwise): Khun Han, Si Rattana, and Benchalak of Sisaket Province; Thung Si Udom and Nam Khun of Ubon Ratchathani province; Preah Vihear and Oddar Meancheay of Cambodia.

The Khao Phra Wihan National Park office is in the district, while the main attraction of the park, the Khmer temple of Preah Vihear, is across the border in Cambodia.

== Administration ==
=== Central administration ===
The district is divided into 20 subdistricts (tambons), which are further subdivided into 279 administrative villages (mubans).

| No. | Name | Thai | Villages | Pop. |
|---|---|---|---|---|
| 1. | Bueng Malu | บึงมะลู | 20 | 14,564 |
| 2. | Kut Salao | กุดเสลา | 16 | 9,588 |
| 3. | Mueang | เมือง | 10 | 6,676 |
| 5. | Sang Mek | สังเม็ก | 20 | 13,281 |
| 6. | Nam Om | น้ำอ้อม | 16 | 17,250 |
| 7. | Lalai | ละลาย | 12 | 7,586 |
| 8. | Rung | รุง | 10 | 7,781 |
| 9. | Trakat | ตระกาจ | 12 | 7,780 |
| 11. | Chan Yai | จานใหญ่ | 16 | 10,100 |
| 12. | Phu Ngoen | ภูเงิน | 19 | 12,125 |
| 13. | Cham | ชำ | 8 | 5,371 |
| 14. | Krachaeng | กระแชง | 20 | 16,873 |
| 15. | Non Samran | โนนสำราญ | 11 | 6,395 |
| 16. | Nong Ya Lat | หนองหญ้าลาด | 17 | 15,748 |
| 19. | Sao Thong Chai | เสาธงชัย | 13 | 9,907 |
| 20. | Khanun | ขนุน | 15 | 9,955 |
| 21. | Suan Kluai | สวนกล้วย | 12 | 7,328 |
| 23. | Wiang Nuea | เวียงเหนือ | 9 | 5,758 |
| 24. | Thung Yai | ทุ่งใหญ่ | 17 | 11,819 |
| 25. | Phu Pha Mok | ภูผาหมอก | 6 | 4,723 |

Missing numbers belong to tambon which now form Benchalak district.

=== Local administration ===
There is one town (thesaban mueang) in the district:

- Kantharalak (Thai: เทศบาลเมืองกันทรลักษ์) consisting of parts of sub-districts Nam Om and Nong Ya Lat.

There are two sub-district municipalities (thesaban tambon) in the district:

- Nong Ya Lat (Thai: เทศบาลตำบลหนองหญ้าลาด) consisting of parts of sub-district Nong Ya Lat.
- Suan Kluai (Thai: เทศบาลตำบลสวนกล้วย) consisting of sub-district Suan Kluai.

There are 18 subdistrict administrative organizations (SAO) in the district:

- Bueng Malu (Thai: องค์การบริหารส่วนตำบลบึงมะลู) consisting of sub-district Bueng Malu.
- Kut Salao (Thai: องค์การบริหารส่วนตำบลกุดเสลา) consisting of sub-district Kut Salao.
- Mueang (Thai: องค์การบริหารส่วนตำบลเมือง) consisting of sub-district Mueang.
- Sang Mek (Thai: องค์การบริหารส่วนตำบลสังเม็ก) consisting of sub-district Sang Mek.
- Nam Om (Thai: องค์การบริหารส่วนตำบลน้ำอ้อม) consisting of parts of sub-district Nam Om.
- Lalai (Thai: องค์การบริหารส่วนตำบลละลาย) consisting of sub-district Lalai.
- Rung (Thai: องค์การบริหารส่วนตำบลรุง) consisting of sub-district Rung.
- Trakat (Thai: องค์การบริหารส่วนตำบลตระกาจ) consisting of sub-district Trakat.
- Chan Yai (Thai: องค์การบริหารส่วนตำบลจานใหญ่) consisting of sub-district Chan Yai.
- Phu Ngoen (Thai: องค์การบริหารส่วนตำบลภูเงิน) consisting of sub-district Phu Ngoen.
- Cham (Thai: องค์การบริหารส่วนตำบลชำ) consisting of sub-district Cham.
- Krachaeng (Thai: องค์การบริหารส่วนตำบลกระแชง) consisting of sub-district Krachaeng.
- Non Samran (Thai: องค์การบริหารส่วนตำบลโนนสำราญ) consisting of sub-district Non Samran.
- Sao Thong Chai (Thai: องค์การบริหารส่วนตำบลเสาธงชัย) consisting of sub-district Sao Thong Chai.
- Khanun (Thai: องค์การบริหารส่วนตำบลขนุน) consisting of sub-district Khanun.
- Wiang Nuea (Thai: องค์การบริหารส่วนตำบลเวียงเหนือ) consisting of sub-district Wiang Nuea.
- Thung Yai (Thai: องค์การบริหารส่วนตำบลทุ่งใหญ่) consisting of sub-district Thung Yai.
- Phu Pha Mok (Thai: องค์การบริหารส่วนตำบลภูผาหมอก) consisting of sub-district Phu Pha Mok.
