= Si Narong district =

Si Narong ศรีณรงค์
- District
- District location in Surin province
- Coordinates: 14°46′1″N 103°52′29″E
- Country: Thailand
- Province: Surin
- Seat: Narong

Area
  - Total: 410.0 km^{2} (158.3 sq mi)

Population (2005)
  - Total: 46,029
  - Density: 112.3/km^{2} (291/sq mi)
- Time zone: UTC+7 (ICT)
- Postal code: 32150
- Geocode: 3215

Si Narong (Thai: ศรีณรงค์, pronounced [sǐː nā.rōŋ]) is a district (amphoe) of Surin province, northeastern Thailand.

== History ==
The minor district (king amphoe) was established on 1 April 1995 with five tambons split from Sangkha district.

On 15 May 2007, all 81 minor districts were upgraded to full districts. On 24 August the upgrade became official.

== Geography ==
Neighboring districts are (from the south clockwise): Sangkha, Lamduan and Sikhoraphum of Surin Province, Prang Ku and Khukhan of Sisaket province.

== Administration ==
The district is divided into five sub-districts (tambons), which are further subdivided into 62 villages (mubans). There are no municipal (thesaban) areas. There are five tambon administrative organizations (TAO).

No.	Name	Thai name	Villages	Pop.
1.	Narong	ณรงค์	13	9,523
2.	Chaenwaen	แจนแวน	11	8,952
3.	Truat	ตรวจ	15	12,457
4.	Nong Waeng	หนองแวง	11	5,795
5.	Si Suk	ศรีสุข	12	9,302
