= Sangkha district =

Sangkha สังขะ
- District
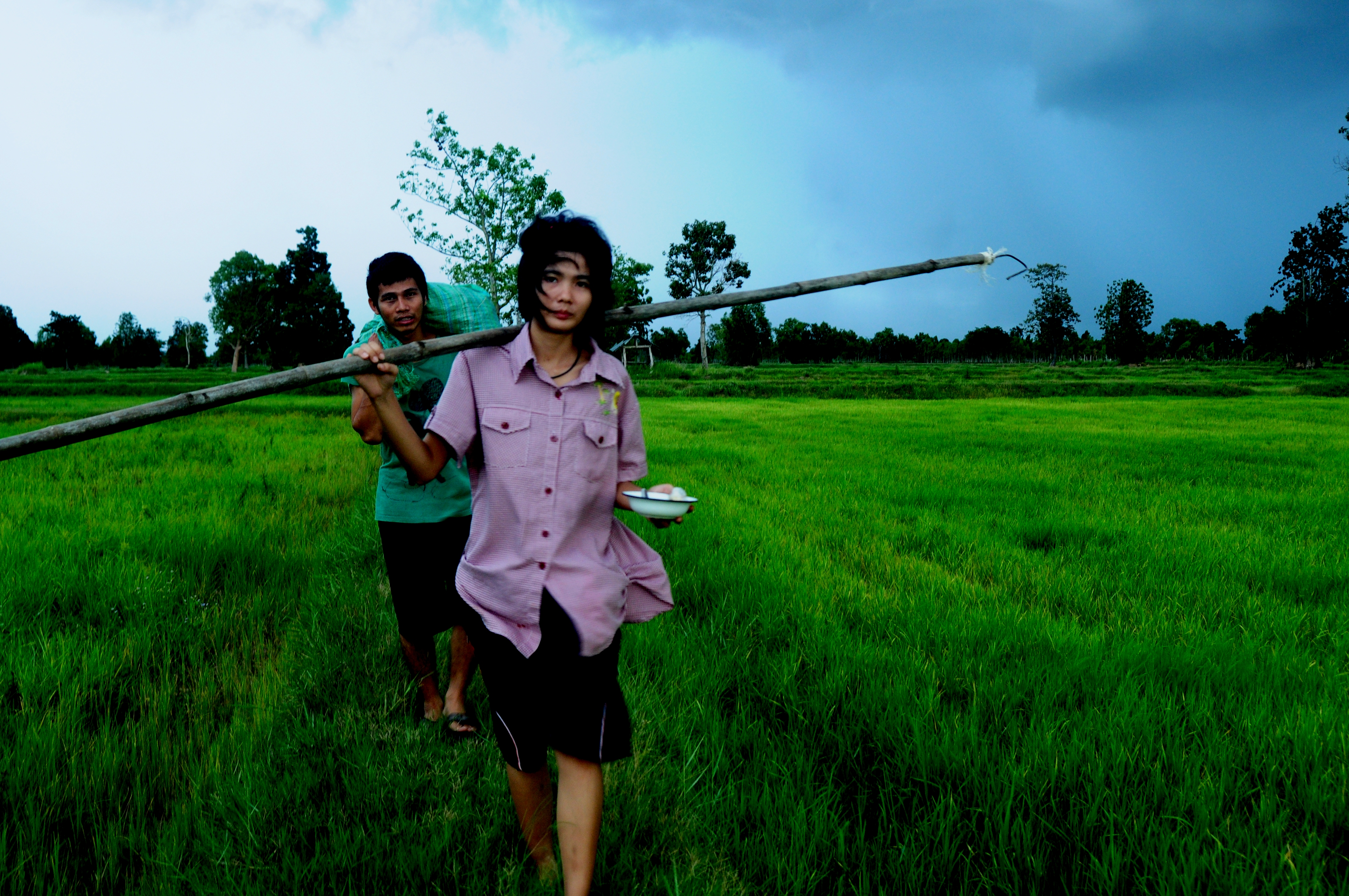
- Ban Non Sabai, tambon Krathiam

- District location in Surin province
- Coordinates: 14°38′10″N 103°51′10″E
- Country: Thailand
- Province: Surin
- Seat: Sangkha

Area
  - Total: 1,009.0 km^{2} (389.6 sq mi)

Population (2014)
  - Total: 129,993
  - Density: 124.4/km^{2} (322/sq mi)
- Time zone: UTC+7 (ICT)
- Postal code: 32150
- Geocode: 3210

Sangkha (Thai: สังขะ, pronounced [sǎŋ.kʰàʔ]) is a district (amphoe) in the southern part of Surin province, northeastern Thailand.

== History ==
In 1759 the White Elephant of King Ekkathat escaped from Ayutthaya to the forest in Khwaeng Mueang Phimai area. Chiang Kha (เชียงฆะ), leader of Ban Khok Atcha and his groups volunteered to catch the elephant and succeeded. King Ekkathat promoted him to be Phra Sangkhaburi Si Nakhon Atcha (พระสังฆะบุรีศรีนครอัจจะ) and upgraded Ban Khok Atcha to be Mueang Sangkha in 1763.

In 1778, King Taksin the Great led his troops to Vientiane and Champasak. Mueang Sangkha was a part of the king troops. When King Taksin won, he promoted the governor of Sangkha to the rank of a Phraya.

In 1806 the status of Mueang Sangkha was upgraded to be a direct subordinate of the capital Bangkok.

In 1828 Phraya Sankhaburi (Thong Duang) was endorsed to become Mueang Khukhan governor to replace the previous governor.

In 1907 Monthon Isan was divided into four sections (boriwen). Mueang Sangkha was under the Surin Section, together with Mueang Surin. Mueang Sangkha at that time was subdivided into three districts: Sangkha, Si Khonphum, and Changkan.

In 1912 Monthon Isan was split into Monthon Roi Et and Monthon Ubon Ratchathani. Mueang Surin was included in Monthon Ubon Ratchathani. Mueang Sankha continued to be under Mueang Surin.

== Geography ==
Neighboring districts are (from the west clockwise): Kap Choeng, Prasat, Lamduan, Si Narong of Surin Province; Khukhan of Sisaket province; Buachet of Surin Province; and Oddar Meancheay of Cambodia. The southern part of this district is in the Dângrêk Mountains.

== Administration ==
The district is divided into 12 sub-districts (tambons), which are further subdivided into 187 villages (mubans). Sangkha itself is a sub-district municipality (thesaban tambon) and covers parts of tambons Sangkha and Ban Chop. There are a further 12 tambon administrative organizations (TAO).

No.	Name	Thai	Villages	Pop.
1.	Sangkha	สังขะ	17	13,699
2.	Khon Taek	ขอนแตก	17	9,597
6.	Dom	ดม	16	7,873
7.	Phra Kaeo	พระแก้ว	17	12,661
8.	Ban Chan	บ้านจารย์	13	8,121
9.	Krathiam	กระเทียม	21	13,094
10.	Sakat	สะกาด	15	9,772
11.	Ta Tum	ตาตุม	17	13,509
12.	Thap Than	ทับทัน	16	11,571
13.	Ta Khong	ตาคง	14	8,676
15.	Ban Chop	บ้านชบ	11	9,663
17.	Thep Raksa	เทพรักษา	13	8,636

Missing numbers now form Si Narong District.
