= Phrai Bueng district =

Phrai Bueng ไพรบึง
- District
- District location in Sisaket province
- Coordinates: 14°44′54″N 104°21′42″E
- Country: Thailand
- Province: Sisaket
- Seat: Phrai Bueng

Area
  - Total: 248.8 km^{2} (96.1 sq mi)

Population (2009)
  - Total: 47,725
  - Density: 191.82/km^{2} (496.8/sq mi)
- Time zone: UTC+7 (ICT)
- Postal code: 33180
- Geocode: 3306

Phrai Bueng (Thai: ไพรบึง, pronounced [pʰrāj bɯ̄ŋ]) is a district (amphoe) in the central part of Sisaket province, northeastern Thailand.

== Geography ==
Neighbouring districts are (from the north clockwise): Phayu, Si Rattana, Khun Han, Khukhan, and Wang Hin.

== History ==
The area of the district was originally part of Khukhan district. On 1 October 1969 tambons Phrai Bueng, Samrong Phlan, Din Daeng, and Prasat Yoe were split off and formed the new minor district (king amphoe) Phrai Bueng. On 22 August 1975 it was upgraded to a full district.

== Administration ==
The district is divided into six sub-districts (tambons), which are further subdivided into 81 villages (mubans). Phrai Bueng is a township (thesaban tambon) which covers parts of tambons Phrai Bueng and Samrong Phlan. There are a further six tambon administrative organizations (TAO).

No.	Name	Thai name	Villages	Pop.
1.	Phrai Bueng	ไพรบึง	21	16,121
2.	Din Daeng	ดินแดง	9	5,108
3.	Prasat Yoe	ปราสาทเยอ	11	4,872
4.	Samrong Phlan	สำโรงพลัน	17	11,448
5.	Suk Sawat	สุขสวัสดิ์	12	5,634
6.	Non Pun	โนนปูน	11	4,393
