= Prang Ku district =

Prang Ku ปรางค์กู่
- District
- District location in Sisaket province
- Coordinates: 14°51′24″N 104°2′24″E
- Country: Thailand
- Province: Sisaket

Area
  - Total: 285.475 km^{2} (110.223 sq mi)

Population (2005)
  - Total: 68,208
  - Density: 238.9/km^{2} (619/sq mi)
- Time zone: UTC+7 (ICT)
- Postal code: 33170
- Geocode: 3307

Prang Ku (Thai: ปรางค์กู่, pronounced [prāːŋ kùː]) is a district (amphoe) in the western part of Sisaket province, northeastern Thailand.

== Geography ==
Neighboring districts are (from the north clockwise): Huai Thap Than, Uthumphon Phisai, Wang Hin, and Khukhan of Sisaket Province; Si Narong, Sikhoraphum, and Samrong Thap of Surin province.

== History ==
The minor district (king amphoe) Prang Ku was established on 1 January 1961, when it was split off from Khukhan district. The district is named after Prang Samong in Ban Ku. On 17 July 1963 it was upgraded to a full district.

== Administration ==
The district is divided into 10 sub-districts (tambons), which are further subdivided into 141 villages (mubans). Prang Ku is a township (thesaban tambon) which covers parts of tambon Phimai and Phimai Nuea. There are a further 10 tambon administrative organizations (TAO).

No.	Name	Thai name	Villages	Pop.
1.	Phimai	พิมาย	13	7,306
2.	Ku	กู่	17	12,182
3.	Nong Chiang Thun	หนองเชียงทูน	19	9,439
4.	Tum	ตูม	11	6,193
5.	Samo	สมอ	17	7,522
6.	Pho Si	โพธิ์ศรี	14	5,519
7.	Samrong Prasat	สำโรงปราสาท	17	6,893
8.	Du	ดู่	13	4,794
9.	Sawai	สวาย	10	4,082
10.	Phimai Nuea	พิมายเหนือ	10	4,278
