= Bueng Sam Phan district =

Bueng Sam Phan บึงสามพัน
- District
- District location in Phetchabun province
- Coordinates: 15°47′48″N 101°0′30″E
- Country: Thailand
- Province: Phetchabun
- Seat: Bueng Sam Phan

Area
  - Total: 489.8 km^{2} (189.1 sq mi)

Population (2000)
  - Total: 66,613
  - Density: 136/km^{2} (350/sq mi)
- Time zone: UTC+7 (ICT)
- Postal code: 67160
- Geocode: 6708

Bueng Sam Phan (Thai: บึงสามพัน, pronounced [bɯ̄ŋ sǎːm pʰān]) is a district (amphoe) in the southern part of Phetchabun province, northern Thailand.

== History ==
Tambon Sap Samo Thot was created by separating it from Tambon Ban Phot, Nong Phai district in 1966. On 15 May 1975 tambon Sap Samo Thot together with tambons Sap Mai Daeng, Nong Chaeng, and Kan Chu were split from Nong Phai District to create the minor district (king amphoe) Bueng Sam Phan. It was named Bueng Sam Phan ('Sam Phan pond') after the most important water resource of the district.

The minor district was upgraded to a full district on 25 March 1979.

== Geography ==
Neighbouring districts are (from the north clockwise) Chon Daen and Nong Phai of Phetchabun Province, Phakdi Chumphon of Chaiyaphum province, Wichian Buri of Phetchabun, and Phaisali and Nong Bua of Nakhon Sawan province.

== Administration ==
The district is divided into nine sub-districts (tambons), which are further subdivided into 117 villages (mubans). Sap Samo Thot is a township (thesaban tambon) and covers parts of tambons Sap Samo Thot and Bueng Sam Phan. There are nine tambon administrative organizations (TAO).

| 1. | Sap Samo Thot | ซับสมอทอด |
| 2. | Sap Mai Daeng | ซับไม้แดง |
| 3. | Nong Chaeng | หนองแจง |
| 4. | Kan Chu | กันจุ |
| 5. | Wang Phikun | วังพิกุล |
| 6. | Phaya Wang | พญาวัง |
| 7. | Si Mongkhon | ศรีมงคล |
| 8. | Sa Kaeo | สระแก้ว |
| 9. | Bueng Sam Phan | บึงสามพัน |
