= Soem Klang =

Soem Klang เสริมกลาง
- Tambon
- Country: Thailand
- Province: Lampang
- Amphoe: Soem Ngam District

Population (2005)
  - Total: 8,400
- Time zone: UTC+7 (Thailand)

Soem Klang (Thai: เสริมกลาง) is a village and tambon (subdistrict) of Soem Ngam District, in Lampang Province, Thailand. In 2005 it had a total population of 8400 people. The tambon contains 9 villages.
