= Si Rattana district =

Si Rattana ศรีรัตนะ
- District
- District location in Sisaket province
- Coordinates: 14°47′36″N 104°28′11″E
- Country: Thailand
- Province: Sisaket
- Seat: Si Kaeo

Area
  - Total: 236.684 km^{2} (91.384 sq mi)

Population (2008)
  - Total: 51,933
  - Density: 219.4/km^{2} (568/sq mi)
- Time zone: UTC+7 (ICT)
- Postal code: 33240
- Geocode: 3314

Si Rattana (Thai: ศรีรัตนะ, pronounced [sǐ rát.tā.náʔ]) is a district (amphoe) in the central part of Sisaket province, northeastern Thailand.

== Geography ==
Neighboring districts are (from the north clockwise): Phayu, Nam Kliang, Benchalak, Kantharalak, Khun Han and Phrai Bueng.

== History ==
The minor district (king amphoe) was created on 5 March 1981, when the four tambons, Si Kaeo, Phing Phuai, Sa Yao, and Tum, were split off from Kantharalak district. It was upgraded to a full district on 26 May 1989.

== Administration ==
The district is divided into seven sub-districts (tambons), which are further subdivided into 90 villages (mubans). Si Rattana is a sub-district municipality (thesaban tambon), which covers parts of tambons Si Kaeo and Saphung. There are a further seven tambon administrative organizations (TAO).

No.	Name	Thai	Villages	Pop.
1.	Si Kaeo	ศรีแก้ว	15	9,352
2.	Phing Phuai	พิงพวย	14	8,934
3.	Sa Yao	สระเยาว์	14	7,325
4.	Tum	ตูม	12	8,769
5.	Sueang Khao	เสื่องข้าว	11	6,274
6.	Si Non Ngam	ศรีโนนงาม	10	4,598
7.	Saphung	สะพุง	14	6,681
