= Yang Khram =

Coordinates: 18.5577°N 98.8307°E

Yang Khram ยางคราม
- Tambon
- Interactive map of Yang Khram
- Country: Thailand
- Province: Chiang Mai
- District: Doi Lo

Population (2015)
  - Total: 4,974
- Time zone: UTC+7 (ICT)
- Postal code: 50160
- TIS 1099: 502403

Yang Khram (Thai: ยางคราม) is a tambon (subdistrict) of Doi Lo District, in Chiang Mai Province, Thailand. In 2015 it had a population of 4,974 people.

== Administration ==
=== Central administration ===
The tambon is divided into 11 administrative villages (mubans).

No.	Name	Thai
1.	Ban Huai Nam Khao	บ้านห้วยน้ำขาว
2.	Ban Mai Phatthana	บ้านใหม่พัฒนา
3.	Ban Yang Khram	บ้านยางคราม
4.	Ban Huai Rak Mai	บ้านห้วยรากไม้
5.	Ban Don Chai	บ้านดอนชัย
6.	Ban Si Daen Mueang	บ้านศรีแดนเมือง
7.	Ban Mae Ao	บ้านแม่อาว
8.	Ban Mai Don Chai	บ้านใหม่ดอนชัย
9.	Ban Huai Rak Mai Bon	บ้านห้วยรากไม้บน
10.	Ban Phanang	บ้านผนัง
11.	Ban Nong Muang	บ้านหนองม่วง

=== Local administration ===
The subdistrict is covered by the subdistrict municipality (thesaban tambon) Yang Khram (เทศบาลตำบลยางคราม).
