= Sam Chuk subdistrict =

Subdistrict in Sam Chuk district, Suphanburi province, Thailand

Sam Chuk (Thai: สามชุก, pronounced [sǎːm t͡ɕʰúk]) is a sub-district (tambon) of Sam Chuk District in the northern part of Suphanburi Province, central Thailand.
