= San Klang, Chiang Rai =

San Klang สันกลาง
- Tambon
- Country: Thailand
- Province: Chiang Rai
- Amphoe: Phan

Population (2005)
  - Total: 8,611
- Time zone: UTC+7 (Thailand)

San Klang (Thai: สันกลาง) is a village and tambon (subdistrict) of Phan District in Chiang Rai Province, Thailand. In 2005 it had a total population of 8,611 people. The tambon contains 17 villages.
