= San Klang, San Kamphaeng =

Coordinates: 18.7708°N 99.0537°E

San Klang สันกลาง
- Tambon
- Interactive map of San Klang
- Country: Thailand
- Province: Chiang Mai
- District: San Kamphaeng

Population (2005)
  - Total: 6,088
- Time zone: UTC+7 (ICT)

San Klang (Thai: สันกลาง) is a tambon (subdistrict) of San Kamphaeng District, in Chiang Mai Province, Thailand. In 2005 it had a population of 6,088 people. The tambon contains eight villages.
