= Santi Suk, Chiang Rai =

Santi Suk สันติสุข
- Tambon
- Country: Thailand
- Province: Chiang Rai
- District: Phan

Population (2005)
  - Total: 5,614
- Time zone: UTC+7 (ICT)

Santi Suk (Thai: สันติสุข) is a village and tambon (subdistrict) of Phan District, in Chiang Rai Province, Thailand. In 2005 it had a population of 5,614 people. The tambon contains nine villages.
