= Doi Lo district =

Doi Lo ดอยหล่อ
- District
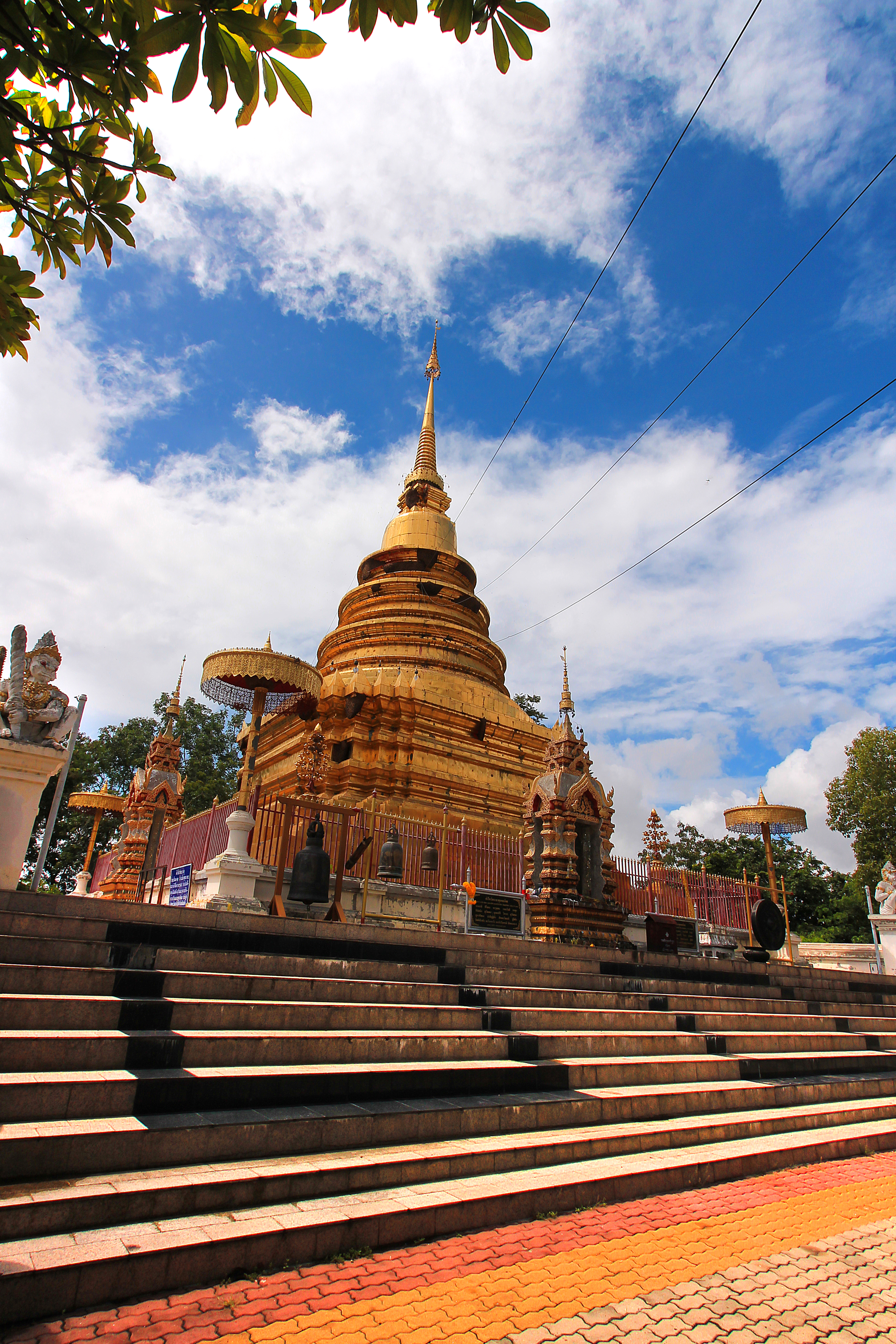
- Wat Phra That Doi Noi

- District location in Chiang Mai province
- Coordinates: 18°28′28″N 98°47′1″E
- Country: Thailand
- Province: Chiang Mai
- Seat: Doi Lo

Area
  - Total: 260.1 km^{2} (100.4 sq mi)

Population (2005)
  - Total: 27,623
  - Density: 106.2/km^{2} (275/sq mi)
- Time zone: UTC+7 (ICT)
- Postal code: 50160
- Geocode: 5024

Doi Lo (Thai: ดอยหล่อ, pronounced [dɔ̄ːj lɔ̀ː]; Northern Thai:) is a district (amphoe) of Chiang Mai province in northern Thailand.

== Geography ==
Neighboring districts are (from the southwest clockwise) Chom Thong, Mae Wang, San Pa Tong of Chiang Mai Province, Pa Sang and Wiang Nong Long of Lamphun province.

== History ==
The minor district (king amphoe) was established on 1 April 1995, when four tambons were split off from Chom Thong.

On 15 May 2007, all 81 minor districts were upgraded to full districts. On 24 August the upgrade became official.

== Administration ==
The district is divided into four sub-districts (tambon), which are further subdivided into 54 villages (muban). There are no municipal (thesaban) areas, and four tambon administrative organizations (TAO).

No.	Name	Thai name	Villages	Pop.
1.	Doi Lo	ดอยหล่อ	26	12,809
2.	Song Khwae	สองแคว	8	5,560
3.	Yang Khram	ยางคราม	11	5,182
4.	Santi Suk	สันติสุข	9	4,072
