= Khun Han district =

Khun Han ขุนหาญ
- District
- District location in Sisaket province
- Coordinates: 14°37′2″N 104°25′28″E
- Country: Thailand
- Province: Sisaket

Area
  - Total: 723.1 km^{2} (279.2 sq mi)

Population (2008)
  - Total: 104,015
  - Density: 143.8/km^{2} (372/sq mi)
- Time zone: UTC+7 (ICT)
- Postal code: 33150
- Geocode: 3308

Khun Han (Thai: ขุนหาญ, pronounced [kʰǔn hǎːn]) is a district (amphoe) in the southern part of Sisaket province, northeastern Thailand.

== History ==
In 1958 the minor district Khun Han (then still spelled ขุนหาร) was upgraded to a full district.

== Geography ==
The district is bounded in the south by the Dangrek Range. Neighboring districts are (from the west clockwise): Phu Sing, Khukhan, Phrai Bueng, Si Rattana, and Kantharalak of Sisaket Province, and Oddar Meancheay of Cambodia.

== Administration ==
The district is divided into 12 sub-districts (tambons), which are further subdivided into 145 villages (mubans). Khun Han itself is a sub-district municipality (thesaban tambon) and covers parts of tambons Si and Non Sung. Other sub-district municipalities are Si, Krawan, Non Sung, Kanthrom, and Pho Krasang, each covering the same-named sub-district except those areas belonging to Khun Han municipality. The remaining seven sub-districts each have a tambon administrative organization (TAO).

No.	Name	Thai	Villages	Pop.
1.	Si	สิ	14	11,461
2.	Bak Dong	บักดอง	22	14,666
3.	Phran	พราน	20	15,716
4.	Pho Wong	โพธิ์วงศ์	8	6,192
5.	Phrai	ไพร	11	6,406
6.	Krawan	กระหวัน	12	8,701
7.	Khun Han	ขุนหาญ	9	5,813
8.	Non Sung	โนนสูง	9	7,791
9.	Kanthrom	กันทรอม	13	8,471
10.	Phu Fai	ภูฝ้าย	8	5,009
11.	Pho Krasang	โพธิ์กระสังข์	14	8,990
12.	Huai Chan	ห้วยจันทร์	5	4,799
