= San Klang, San Pa Tong =

San Klang สันกลาง
- Tambon
- Country: Thailand
- Province: Chiang Mai
- District: San Pa Tong

Population (2005)
  - Total: 4,478
- Time zone: UTC+7 (ICT)

San Klang (Thai: สันกลาง) is a tambon (subdistrict) of San Pa Tong District, in Chiang Mai Province, Thailand. In 2005 it had a population of 4,478 people. The tambon contains nine villages.
