= Song Khwae, Chiang Mai =

Song Khwae สองแคว
- Tambon
- Country: Thailand
- Province: Chiang Mai
- District: Doi Lo

Population (2005)
  - Total: 5,560
- Time zone: UTC+7 (ICT)

Song Khwae (Thai: สองแคว) is a tambon (subdistrict) of Doi Lo District, in Chiang Mai Province, Thailand. In 2005 it had a population of 5,560 people. The tambon contains eight villages.
