= List of tambon in Thailand (C) =

This is a list of tambon (sub-districts) in Thailand, beginning with the letter C. This information is liable to change due to border changes or re-allocation of Tambons.

Tambon (subdistrict)	ตำบล	Amphoe (district)	อำเภอ	Changwat (province)	จังหวัด	Region
Cha-am	ชะอำ	Cha-am	ชะอำ	Phetchaburi	เพชรบุรี	West
Cha-kwa	จะกว๊ะ	Raman (Malay: Reman)	รามัน	Yala	ยะลา	South
Cha-om	ชะอม	Kaeng Khoi	แก่งคอย	Saraburi	สระบุรี	Central
Cha-uat	ชะอวด	Cha-uat	ชะอวด	Nakhon Si Thammarat	นครศรีธรรมราช	South
Chabang Tiko	จะบังติกอ	Mueang Pattani (Malay: Patani)	เมืองปัตตานี	Pattani	ปัตตานี	South
Chae	แชะ	Khon Buri	ครบุรี	Nakhon Ratchasima	นครราชสีมา	North-East
Chae Chang	แช่ช้าง	San Kamphaeng	สันกำแพง	Chiang Mai	เชียงใหม่	North
Chae Hom	แจ้ห่ม	Chae Hom	แจ้ห่ม	Lampang	ลำปาง	North
Chae Son	แจ้ซ้อน	Mueang Pan	เมืองปาน	Lampang	ลำปาง	North
Chaelae	แชแล	Kumphawapi	กุมภวาปี	Udon Thani	อุดรธานี	North-East
Chaem Luang	แจ่มหลวง	Galyani Vadhana	กัลยาณิวัฒนา	Chiang Mai	เชียงใหม่	North
Chaen Laen	แจนแลน	Kuchinarai	กุฉินารายณ์	Kalasin	กาฬสินธุ์	North-East
Chaeng Ngam	แจงงาม	Nong Ya Sai	หนองหญ้าไซ	Suphan Buri	สุพรรณบุรี	Central
Chaenwaen	แจนแวน	Si Narong	ศรีณรงค์	Surin	สุรินทร์	North-East
Chaeramae	แจระแม	Mueang Ubon Ratchathani	เมืองอุบลราชธานี	Ubon Ratchathani	อุบลราชธานี	North-East
Chai Badan	ชัยบาดาล	Chai Badan	ชัยบาดาล	Lopburi	ลพบุรี	Central
Chai Buri	ชัยบุรี	Mueang Phatthalung	เมืองพัทลุง	Phatthalung	พัทลุง	South
Chai Buri	ชัยบุรี	Chai Buri	ชัยบุรี	Surat Thani	สุราษฎร์ธานี	South
Chai Chumphon	ชัยจุมพล	Laplae	ลับแล	Uttaradit	อุตรดิตถ์	North
Chai Di	ใจดี	Khukhan	ขุขันธ์	Sisaket	ศรีสะเกษ	North-East
Chai Kasem	ชัยเกษม	Bang Saphan	บางสะพาน	Prachuap Khiri Khan	ประจวบคีรีขันธ์	West
Chai Mongkhon	ชัยมงคล	Mueang Nakhon Ratchasima	เมืองนครราชสีมา	Nakhon Ratchasima	นครราชสีมา	North-East
Chai Mongkhon	ชัยมงคล	Mueang Samut Sakhon	เมืองสมุทรสาคร	Samut Sakhon	สมุทรสาคร	Central
Chai Narai	ชัยนารายณ์	Chai Badan	ชัยบาดาล	Lopburi	ลพบุรี	Central
Chai Nat	ชัยนาท	Mueang Chai Nat	เมืองชัยนาท	Chai Nat	ชัยนาท	Central
Chai Sathan	ไชยสถาน	Saraphi	สารภี	Chiang Mai	เชียงใหม่	North
Chai So	ไชยสอ	Chum Phae	ชุมแพ	Khon Kaen	ขอนแก่น	North-East
Chai Wan	ไชยวาน	Chai Wan	ไชยวาน	Udon Thani	อุดรธานี	North-East
Chai Watthana	ไชยวัฒนา	Pua	ปัว	Nan	น่าน	North
Chaiburi	ไชยบุรี	Tha Uthen	ท่าอุเทน	Nakhon Phanom	นครพนม	North-East
Chaiyakhram	ไชยคราม	Don Sak	ดอนสัก	Surat Thani	สุราษฎร์ธานี	South
Chaiyamontri	ไชยมนตรี	Mueang Nakhon Si Thammarat	นครศรีธรรมราช	Nakhon Si Thammarat	นครศรีธรรมราช	South
Chaiyanam	ชัยนาม	Wang Thong	วังทอง	Phitsanulok	พิษณุโลก	Central
Chaiyaphon	ชัยพร	Mueang Bueng Kan	เมืองบึงกาฬ	Bueng Kan	บึงกาฬ	North-East
Chaiyaphruek	ชัยพฤกษ์	Mueang Loei	เมืองเลย	Loei	เลย	North-East
Chaiyaphum	ไชยภูมิ	Chaiyo	ไชโย	Ang Thong	อ่างทอง	Central
Chaiyarit	ไชยราช	Bang Saphan Noi	บางสะพานน้อย	Prachuap Khiri Khan	ประจวบคีรีขันธ์	West
Chaiyarit	ชัยฤทธิ์	Chaiyo	ไชโย	Ang Thong	อ่างทอง	Central
Chaiyo	ไชโย	Chaiyo	ไชโย	Ang Thong	อ่างทอง	Central
Chak Bok	ชากบก	Ban Khai	บ้านค่าย	Rayong	ระยอง	East
Chak Don	ชากโดน	Klaeng	แกลง	Rayong	ระยอง	East
Chak Phong	ชากพง	Klaeng	แกลง	Rayong	ระยอง	East
Chak Thai	ชากไทย	Khao Khitchakut	เขาคิชฌกูฏ	Chanthaburi	จันทบุรี	East
Chakkarat	จักราช	Chakkarat	จักราช	Nakhon Ratchasima	นครราชสีมา	North-East
Chakkarat	จักราช	Phak Hai	ผักไห่	Phra Nakhon Si Ayutthaya	พระนครศรีอยุธยา	Central
Chakkrawat	จักรวรรดิ	Khet Samphanthawong	สัมพันธวงศ์	Bangkok	กรุงเทพมหานคร	Central
Chakong	จะกง	Khukhan	ขุขันธ์	Sisaket	ศรีสะเกษ	North-East
Chaksi	จักรสีห์	Mueang Sing Buri	เมืองสิงห์บุรี	Sing Buri	สิงห์บุรี	Central
Chalae	ชะแล	Thong Pha Phum	ทองผาภูมิ	Kanchanaburi	กาญจนบุรี	West
Chalae	ชะแล้	Singhanakhon	สิงหนคร	Songkhla	สงขลา	South
Chaliang	เฉลียง	Khon Buri	ครบุรี	Nakhon Ratchasima	นครราชสีมา	North-East
Chaloem	เฉลิม	Ra-ngae	ระแงะ	Narathiwat	นราธิวาส	South
Chalong	ฉลอง	Sichon	สิชล	Nakhon Si Thammarat	นครศรีธรรมราช	South
Chalong	ฉลอง	Mueang Phuket	เมืองภูเก็ต	Phuket	ภูเก็ต	South
Chalung	ฉลุง	Mueang Satun (Malay: Mambang)	เมืองสตูล	Satun	สตูล	South
Chalung	ฉลุง	Hat Yai	หาดใหญ่	Songkhla	สงขลา	South
Cham	ชำ	Kantharalak	กันทรลักษ์	Sisaket	ศรีสะเกษ	North-East
Cham Kho	ชำฆ้อ	Khao Chamao	เขาชะเมา	Rayong	ระยอง	East
Cham Pa Wai	จำป่าหวาย	Mueang Phayao	เมืองพะเยา	Phayao	พะเยา	North
Cham Phak Phaeo	ชำผักแพว	Kaeng Khoi	แก่งคอย	Saraburi	สระบุรี	Central
Chamaep	ชะแมบ	Wang Noi	วังน้อย	Phra Nakhon Si Ayutthaya	พระนครศรีอยุธยา	Central
Chamai	ชะมาย	Thung Song	ทุ่งสง	Nakhon Si Thammarat	นครศรีธรรมราช	South
Chaman	ฉมัน	Makham	มะขาม	Chanthaburi	จันทบุรี	East
Chamao	ชะเมา	Pak Phanang	ปากพนัง	Nakhon Si Thammarat	นครศรีธรรมราช	South
Chamlong	จำลอง	Sawaeng Ha	แสวงหา	Ang Thong	อ่างทอง	Central
Chamni	ชำนิ	Chamni	ชำนิ	Buriram	บุรีรัมย์	North-East
Champa	จำปา	Tha Ruea	ท่าเรือ	Phra Nakhon Si Ayutthaya	พระนครศรีอยุธยา	Central
Champa Khan	จำปาขัน	Suwannaphum	สุวรรณภูมิ	Roi Et	ร้อยเอ็ด	North-East
Champa Lo	จำปาหล่อ	Mueang Ang Thong	เมืองอ่างทอง	Ang Thong	อ่างทอง	Central
Champa Mong	จำปาโมง	Ban Phue	บ้านผือ	Udon Thani	อุดรธานี	North-East
Champi	จำปี	Si That	ศรีธาตุ	Udon Thani	อุดรธานี	North-East
Chamrae	ชำแระ	Photharam	โพธาราม	Ratchaburi	ราชบุรี	West
Chamrak	ชำราก	Mueang Trat	เมืองตราด	Trat	ตราด	East
Chamuang	ชะมวง	Khuan Khanun	ควนขนุน	Phatthalung	พัทลุง	South
Chan	จาน	Kanthararom	กันทรารมย์	Sisaket	ศรีสะเกษ	North-East
Chan	จาน	Mueang Sisaket	เมืองศรีสะเกษ	Sisaket	ศรีสะเกษ	North-East
Chan Chwa Tai	จันจว้าใต้	Mae Chan	แม่จัน	Chiang Rai	เชียงราย	North
Chan Chwa	จันจว้า	Mae Chan	แม่จัน	Chiang Rai	เชียงราย	North
Chan Di	จันดี	Chawang	ฉวาง	Nakhon Si Thammarat	นครศรีธรรมราช	South
Chan Dum	จันดุม	Phlapphla Chai	พลับพลาชัย	Buriram	บุรีรัมย์	North-East
Chan Kasem	จันทรเกษม	Khet Chatuchak	จตุจักร	Bangkok	กรุงเทพมหานคร	Central
Chan Lan	จานลาน	Phana	พนา	Amnat Charoen	อำนาจเจริญ	North-East
Chan Phen	จันทร์เพ็ญ	Tao Ngoi	เต่างอย	Sakon Nakhon	สกลนคร	North-East
Chan Saen Chai	จานแสนไชย	Huai Thap Than	ห้วยทับทัน	Sisaket	ศรีสะเกษ	North-East
Chan Sen	จันเสน	Takhli	ตาคลี	Nakhon Sawan	นครสวรรค์	Central
Chan Yai	จานใหญ่	Kantharalak	กันทรลักษ์	Sisaket	ศรีสะเกษ	North-East
Chan-at	จันอัด	Non Sung	โนนสูง	Nakhon Ratchasima	นครราชสีมา	North-East
Chana Songkhram	ชนะสงคราม	Khet Phra Nakhon	พระนคร	Bangkok	กรุงเทพมหานคร	Central
Chanae	จะแนะ	Chanae	จะแนะ	Narathiwat	นราธิวาส	South
Chanae	จะแหน	Saba Yoi (Malay: Sebayu)	สะบ้าย้อย	Songkhla	สงขลา	South
Chang	ฉาง	Na Thawi (Malay: Nawi)	นาทวี	Songkhla	สงขลา	South
Chang Hai Tok	ช้างให้ตก	Khok Pho	โคกโพธิ์	Pattani	ปัตตานี	South
Chang Kham	ช้างข้าม	Na Yai Am	นายายอาม	Chanthaburi	จันทบุรี	East
Chang Khlan	ช้างคลาน	Mueang Chiang Mai	เมืองเชียงใหม่	Chiang Mai	เชียงใหม่	North
Chang Khoeng	ช่างเคิ่ง	Mae Chaem	แม่แจ่ม	Chiang Mai	เชียงใหม่	North
Chang Khwa	ช้างขวา	Kanchanadit	กาญจนดิษฐ์	Surat Thani	สุราษฎร์ธานี	South
Chang Klang	ช้างกลาง	Chang Klang	ช้างกลาง	Nakhon Si Thammarat	นครศรีธรรมราช	South
Chang Lek	ช่างเหล็ก	Bang Sai	บางไทร	Phra Nakhon Si Ayutthaya	พระนครศรีอยุธยา	Central
Chang Ming	ช้างมิ่ง	Phanna Nikhom	พรรณนานิคม	Sakon Nakhon	สกลนคร	North-East
Chang Moi	ช้างม่อย	Mueang Chiang Mai	เมืองเชียงใหม่	Chiang Mai	เชียงใหม่	North
Chang Noi	ช้างน้อย	Bang Sai	บางไทร	Phra Nakhon Si Ayutthaya	พระนครศรีอยุธยา	Central
Chang Nuea	จางเหนือ	Mae Mo	แม่เมาะ	Lampang	ลำปาง	North
Chang Phueak	ช้างเผือก	Suwannaphum	สุวรรณภูมิ	Roi Et	ร้อยเอ็ด	North-East
Chang Phueak	ช้างเผือก	Chanae	จะแนะ	Narathiwat	นราธิวาส	South
Chang Phueak	ช้างเผือก	Mueang Chiang Mai	เมืองเชียงใหม่	Chiang Mai	เชียงใหม่	North
Chang Pi	ช่างปี่	Sikhoraphum	ศีขรภูมิ	Surin	สุรินทร์	North-East
Chang Raek	ช้างแรก	Bang Saphan Noi	บางสะพานน้อย	Prachuap Khiri Khan	ประจวบคีรีขันธ์	West
Chang Sai	ช้างซ้าย	Phra Phrom	พระพรหม	Nakhon Si Thammarat	นครศรีธรรมราช	South
Chang Sai	ช้างซ้าย	Kanchanadit	กาญจนดิษฐ์	Surat Thani	สุราษฎร์ธานี	South
Chang Talut	ช้างตะลูด	Lom Sak	หล่มสัก	Phetchabun	เพชรบูรณ์	Central
Chang Thong	ช้างทอง	Chaloem Phra Kiat	เฉลิมพระเกียรติ	Nakhon Ratchasima	นครราชสีมา	North-East
Chang Thun	ช้างทูน	Bo Rai	บ่อไร่	Trat	ตราด	East
Chang Yai	ช้างใหญ่	Bang Sai	บางไทร	Phra Nakhon Si Ayutthaya	พระนครศรีอยุธยา	Central
Changhan	จังหาร	Changhan	จังหาร	Roi Et	ร้อยเอ็ด	North-East
Chaniang	เฉนียง	Mueang Surin	เมืองสุรินทร์	Surin	สุรินทร์	North-East
Chanong	จะโหนง	Chana (Malay: Chenok)	จะนะ	Songkhla	สงขลา	South
Chanot	ชะโนด	Wan Yai	หว้านใหญ่	Mukdahan	มุกดาหาร	North-East
Chanot Noi	ชะโนดน้อย	Dong Luang	ดงหลวง	Mukdahan	มุกดาหาร	North-East
Chanthakhlem	จันทเขลม	Khao Khitchakut	เขาคิชฌกูฏ	Chanthaburi	จันทบุรี	East
Chanthanimit	จันทนิมิต	Mueang Chanthaburi	เมืองจันทบุรี	Chanthaburi	จันทบุรี	East
Chanthima	จันทิมา	Lan Krabue	ลานกระบือ	Kamphaeng Phet	กำแพงเพชร	Central
Chanthop Phet	จันทบเพชร	Ban Kruat	บ้านกรวด	Buriram	บุรีรัมย์	North-East
Chanthuek	จันทึก	Pak Chong	ปากช่อง	Nakhon Ratchasima	นครราชสีมา	North-East
Chanuman	ชานุมาน	Chanuman	ชานุมาน	Amnat Charoen	อำนาจเจริญ	North-East
Chanuwan	ชานุวรรณ	Phanom Phrai	พนมไพร	Roi Et	ร้อยเอ็ด	North-East
Chao Chet	เจ้าเจ็ด	Sena	เสนา	Phra Nakhon Si Ayutthaya	พระนครศรีอยุธยา	Central
Chao Tha	เจ้าท่า	Kamalasai	กมลาไสย	Kalasin	กาฬสินธุ์	North-East
Chao Thong	เจาทอง	Phakdi Chumphon	ภักดีชุมพล	Chaiyaphum	ชัยภูมิ	North-East
Chao Wat	เจ้าวัด	Ban Rai	บ้านไร่	Uthai Thani	อุทัยธานี	Central
Chao Pluk	เจ้าปลุก	Maha Rat	มหาราช	Phra Nakhon Si Ayutthaya	พระนครศรีอยุธยา	Central
Charang	จะรัง	Yaring (Malay: Jamu)	ยะหริ่ง	Pattani	ปัตตานี	South
Charaphat	จารพัต	Sikhoraphum	ศีขรภูมิ	Surin	สุรินทร์	North-East
Charat	จรัส	Buachet	บัวเชด	Surin	สุรินทร์	North-East
Charat	ชะรัด	Kong Ra	กงหรา	Phatthalung	พัทลุง	South
Charim	จริม	Tha Pla	ท่าปลา	Uttaradit	อุตรดิตถ์	North
Charoen Mueang	เจริญเมือง	Phan	พาน	Chiang Rai	เชียงราย	North
Charoen Phon	เจริญผล	Banphot Phisai	บรรพตพิสัย	Nakhon Sawan	นครสวรรค์	Central
Charoen Rat	เจริญราษฎร์	Mae Chai	แม่ใจ	Phayao	พะเยา	North
Charoen Sin	เจริญศิลป์	Charoen Sin	เจริญศิลป์	Sakon Nakhon	สกลนคร	North-East
Charoen Sin	เจริญศิลป์	Phon Na Kaeo	โพนนาแก้ว	Sakon Nakhon	สกลนคร	North-East
Charoen Suk	เจริญสุข	Chaloem Phra Kiat	เฉลิมพระเกียรติ	Buriram	บุรีรัมย์	North-East
Charoen Tham	เจริญธรรม	Wihan Daeng	วิหารแดง	Saraburi	สระบุรี	Central
Chat Trakan	ชาติตระการ	Chat Trakan	ชาติตระการ	Phitsanulok	พิษณุโลก	Central
Chathing Phra	จะทิ้งพระ	Sathing Phra	สทิงพระ	Songkhla	สงขลา	South
Chatuchak	จตุจักร	Khet Chatuchak	จตุจักร	Bangkok	กรุงเทพมหานคร	Central
Chawai	ชะไว	Chaiyo	ไชโย	Ang Thong	อ่างทอง	Central
Chawang, Chawang	ฉวาง	Chawang	ฉวาง	Nakhon Si Thammarat	นครศรีธรรมราช	South
Che Bilang	เจ๊ะบิลัง	Mueang Satun (Malay: Mambang)	เมืองสตูล	Satun	สตูล	South
Chedi	เจดีย์	U Thong	อู่ทอง	Suphan Buri	สุพรรณบุรี	Central
Chedi Chai	เจดีย์ชัย	Pua	ปัว	Nan	น่าน	North
Chedi Hak	เจดีย์หัก	Mueang Ratchaburi	เมืองราชบุรี	Ratchaburi	ราชบุรี	West
Chedi Kham	เจดีย์คำ	Chiang Kham	เชียงคำ	Phayao	พะเยา	North
Chedi Luang	เจดีย์หลวง	Mae Suai	แม่สรวย	Chiang Rai	เชียงราย	North
Chehe	เจ๊ะเห	Tak Bai (Malay: Tabal)	ตากใบ	Narathiwat	นราธิวาส	South
Chet Rio	เจ็ดริ้ว	Ban Phaeo	บ้านแพ้ว	Samut Sakhon	สมุทรสาคร	Central
Chet Samian	เจ็ดเสมียน	Photharam	โพธาราม	Ratchaburi	ราชบุรี	West
Chi Bon	ชีบน	Ban Khwao	บ้านเขว้า	Chaiyaphum	ชัยภูมิ	North-East
Chi Long	ชีลอง	Mueang Chaiyaphum	เมืองชัยภูมิ	Chaiyaphum	ชัยภูมิ	North-East
Chi Nam Rai	ชีน้ำร้าย	In Buri	อินทร์บุรี	Sing Buri	สิงห์บุรี	Central
Chi Thuan	ชีทวน	Khueang Nai	เขื่องใน	Ubon Ratchathani	อุบลราชธานี	North-East
Chian Khao	เชียรเขา	Chaloem Phra Kiat	เฉลิมพระเกียรติ	Nakhon Si Thammarat	นครศรีธรรมราช	South
Chian Yai	เชียรใหญ่	Chian Yai	เชียรใหญ่	Nakhon Si Thammarat	นครศรีธรรมราช	South
Chiang Ban	เชียงบาน	Chiang Kham	เชียงคำ	Phayao	พะเยา	North
Chiang Da	เชียงดา	Sang Khom	สร้างคอม	Udon Thani	อุดรธานี	North-East
Chiang Dao	เชียงดาว	Chiang Dao	เชียงดาว	Chiang Mai	เชียงใหม่	North
Chiang Khan	เชียงคาน	Chiang Khan	เชียงคาน	Loei	เลย	North-East
Chiang Khian	เชียงเคี่ยน	Thoeng	เทิง	Chiang Rai	เชียงราย	North
Chiang Khruea	เชียงเครือ	Mueang Sakon Nakhon	เมืองสกลนคร	Sakon Nakhon	สกลนคร	North-East
Chiang Khruea	เชียงเครือ	Mueang Kalasin	เมืองกาฬสินธุ์	Kalasin	กาฬสินธุ์	North-East
Chiang Khwan	เชียงขวัญ	Chiang Khwan	เชียงขวัญ	Roi Et	ร้อยเอ็ด	North-East
Chiang Klom	เชียงกลม	Pak Chom	ปากชม	Loei	เลย	North-East
Chiang Mai	เชียงใหม่	Pho Chai	โพธิ์ชัย	Roi Et	ร้อยเอ็ด	North-East
Chiang Muan	เชียงม่วน	Chiang Muan	เชียงม่วน	Phayao	พะเยา	North
Chiang Nga	เชียงงา	Ban Mi	บ้านหมี่	Lopburi	ลพบุรี	Central
Chiang Ngoen	เชียงเงิน	Mueang Tak	เมืองตาก	Tak	ตาก	West
Chiang Pheng	เชียงเพ็ง	Kut Chap	กุดจับ	Udon Thani	อุดรธานี	North-East
Chiang Phin	เชียงพิณ	Mueang Udon Thani	เมืองอุดรธานี	Udon Thani	อุดรธานี	North-East
Chiang Raeng	เชียงแรง	Phu Sang	ภูซาง	Phayao	พะเยา	North
Chiang Rak Noi	เชียงรากน้อย	Bang Pa-in	บางปะอิน	Phra Nakhon Si Ayutthaya	พระนครศรีอยุธยา	Central
Chiang Rak Noi	เชียงรากน้อย	Bang Sai	บางไทร	Phra Nakhon Si Ayutthaya	พระนครศรีอยุธยา	Central
Chiang Rak Noi	เชียงรากน้อย	Sam Khok	สามโคก	Pathum Thani	ปทุมธานี	Central
Chiang Rak Yai	เชียงรากใหญ่	Sam Khok	สามโคก	Pathum Thani	ปทุมธานี	Central
Chiang Thong	เชียงทอง	Wang Chao	วังเจ้า	Tak	ตาก	West
Chiang Wae	เชียงแหว	Kumphawapi	กุมภวาปี	Udon Thani	อุดรธานี	North-East
Chiang Wang	เชียงหวาง	Phen	เพ็ญ	Udon Thani	อุดรธานี	North-East
Chiang Yuen	เชียงยืน	Chiang Yuen	เชียงยืน	Maha Sarakham	มหาสารคาม	North-East
Chiang Yuen	เชียงยืน	Mueang Udon Thani	เมืองอุดรธานี	Udon Thani	อุดรธานี	North-East
Chiao Liang	เชี่ยวเหลียง	Kapoe	กะเปอร์	Ranong	ระนอง	South
Chiat	เจียด	Khemarat	เขมราฐ	Ubon Ratchathani	อุบลราชธานี	North-East
Chik Daek	จีกแดก	Phanom Dong Rak	พนมดงรัก	Surin	สุรินทร์	North-East
Chik Du	จิกดู่	Hua Taphan	หัวตะพาน	Amnat Charoen	อำนาจเจริญ	North-East
Chik Sang Thong	จิกสังข์ทอง	Rasi Salai	ราษีไศล	Sisaket	ศรีสะเกษ	North-East
Chik Thoeng	จิกเทิง	Tan Sum	ตาลสุม	Ubon Ratchathani	อุบลราชธานี	North-East
Chim Phli	ฉิมพลี	Khet Taling Chan	ตลิ่งชัน	Bangkok	กรุงเทพมหานคร	Central
Ching Kho	ชิงโค	Singhanakhon	สิงหนคร	Songkhla	สงขลา	South
Chiwan	ชีวาน	Phimai	พิมาย	Nakhon Ratchasima	นครราชสีมา	North-East
Chiwuek	ชีวึก	Kham Sakaesaeng	ขามสะแกแสง	Nakhon Ratchasima	นครราชสีมา	North-East
Chobo	จอเบาะ	Yi-ngo (Malay: Jeringo)	ยี่งอ	Narathiwat	นราธิวาส	South
Cho Hae	ช่อแฮ	Mueang Phrae	เมืองแพร่	Phrae	แพร่	North
Cho Ho	จอหอ	Mueang Nakhon Ratchasima	เมืองนครราชสีมา	Nakhon Ratchasima	นครราชสีมา	North-East
Cho Lae	ช่อแล	Mae Taeng	แม่แตง	Chiang Mai	เชียงใหม่	North
Cho Phaka	ช่อผกา	Chamni	ชำนิ	Buriram	บุรีรัมย์	North-East
Cho Raka	ช่อระกา	Ban Lueam	บ้านเหลื่อม	Nakhon Ratchasima	นครราชสีมา	North-East
Choeng Chum	เชิงชุม	Phanna Nikhom	พรรณนานิคม	Sakon Nakhon	สกลนคร	North-East
Choeng Doi	เชิงดอย	Doi Saket	ดอยสะเก็ด	Chiang Mai	เชียงใหม่	North
Choeng Khiri	เชิงคีรี	Si Sakhon	ศรีสาคร	Narathiwat	นราธิวาส	South
Choeng Klat	เชิงกลัด	Bang Rachan	บางระจัน	Sing Buri	สิงห์บุรี	Central
Choeng Noen	เชิงเนิน	Mueang Rayong	เมืองระยอง	Rayong	ระยอง	East
Choeng Sae	เชิงแส	Krasae Sin	กระแสสินธุ์	Songkhla	สงขลา	South
Choeng Thale	เชิงทะเล	Thalang	ถลาง	Phuket	ภูเก็ต	South
Chok Chai	โชคชัย	Doi Luang	ดอยหลวง	Chiang Rai	เชียงราย	North
Chok Chai	โชคชัย	Nikhom Kham Soi	นิคมคำสร้อย	Mukdahan	มุกดาหาร	North-East
Chok Chai	โชคชัย	Chok Chai	โชคชัย	Nakhon Ratchasima	นครราชสีมา	North-East
Chok Na Sam	โชคนาสาม	Prasat	ปราสาท	Surin	สุรินทร์	North-East
Chok Nuea	โชคเหนือ	Lamduan	ลำดวน	Surin	สุรินทร์	North-East
Chom Bueng	จอมบึง	Chom Bueng	จอมบึง	Ratchaburi	ราชบุรี	West
Chom Chan	จอมจันทร์	Wiang Sa	เวียงสา	Nan	น่าน	North
Chom Charoen	ชมเจริญ	Pak Chom	ปากชม	Loei	เลย	North-East
Chom Mok Kaeo	จอมหมอกแก้ว	Mae Lao	แม่ลาว	Chiang Rai	เชียงราย	North
Chom Phon	จอมพล	Khet Chatuchak	จตุจักร	Bangkok	กรุงเทพมหานคร	Central
Chom Phra	จอมพระ	Chom Phra	จอมพระ	Surin	สุรินทร์	North-East
Chom Phra	จอมพระ	Tha Wang Pha	ท่าวังผา	Nan	น่าน	North
Chom Phu	ชมภู	Saraphi	สารภี	Chiang Mai	เชียงใหม่	North
Chom Prathat	จอมประทัด	Wat Phleng	วัดเพลง	Ratchaburi	ราชบุรี	West
Chom Sa-at	ชมสะอาด	Moei Wadi	เมยวดี	Roi Et	ร้อยเอ็ด	North-East
Chom Sawan	จอมสวรรค์	Mae Chan	แม่จัน	Chiang Rai	เชียงราย	North
Chom Si	จอมศรี	Chiang Khan	เชียงคาน	Loei	เลย	North-East
Chom Si	จอมศรี	Phen	เพ็ญ	Udon Thani	อุดรธานี	North-East
Chom Thong	จอมทอง	Khet Chom Thong	จอมทอง	Bangkok	กรุงเทพมหานคร	Central
Chom Thong	จอมทอง	Mueang Phitsanulok	เมืองพิษณุโลก	Phitsanulok	พิษณุโลก	Central
Chomphu	ชมพู	Noen Maprang	เนินมะปราง	Phitsanulok	พิษณุโลก	Central
Chomphu	ชมพู	Mueang Lampang	เมืองลำปาง	Lampang	ลำปาง	North
Chon Daen	ชนแดน	Chon Daen	ชนแดน	Phetchabun	เพชรบูรณ์	Central
Chon Daen	ชนแดน	Song Khwae	สองแคว	Nan	น่าน	North
Chon Muang	ชอนม่วง	Ban Mi	บ้านหมี่	Lopburi	ลพบุรี	Central
Chon Noi	ชอนน้อย	Phatthana Nikhom	พัฒนานิคม	Lopburi	ลพบุรี	Central
Chon Phrai	ชอนไพร	Mueang Phetchabun	เมืองเพชรบูรณ์	Phetchabun	เพชรบูรณ์	Central
Chon Saradet	ชอนสารเดช	Nong Muang	หนองม่วง	Lopburi	ลพบุรี	Central
Chon Sombun	ชอนสมบูรณ์	Nong Muang	หนองม่วง	Lopburi	ลพบุรี	Central
Chong	ช่อง	Na Yong	นาโยง	Trang	ตรัง	South
Chong Dan	ช่องด่าน	Bo Phloi	บ่อพลอย	Kanchanaburi	กาญจนบุรี	West
Chong Khae	ช่องแค	Takhli	ตาคลี	Nakhon Sawan	นครสวรรค์	Central
Chong Khaep	ช่องแคบ	Phop Phra	พบพระ	Tak	ตาก	West
Chong Kham	จองคำ	Mueang Mae Hong Son	เมืองแม่ฮ่องสอน	Mae Hong Son	แม่ฮ่องสอน	North
Chong Kum	ช่องกุ่ม	Watthana Nakhon	วัฒนานคร	Sa Kaeo	สระแก้ว	East
Chong Lom	ช่องลม	Lan Krabue	ลานกระบือ	Kamphaeng Phet	กำแพงเพชร	Central
Chong Maeo	ช่องแมว	Lam Thamenchai	ลำทะเมนชัย	Nakhon Ratchasima	นครราชสีมา	North-East
Chong Mai Kaeo	ช่องไม้แก้ว	Thung Tako	ทุ่งตะโก	Chumphon	ชุมพร	South
Chong Mek	ช่องเม็ก	Sirindhorn	สิรินธร	Ubon Ratchathani	อุบลราชธานี	North-East
Chong Nonsi	ช่องนนทรี	Khet Yan Nawa	ยานนาวา	Bangkok	กรุงเทพมหานคร	Central
Chong Sadao	ช่องสะเดา	Mueang Kanchanaburi	เมืองกาญจนบุรี	Kanchanaburi	กาญจนบุรี	West
Chong Sakae	ช่องสะแก	Mueang Phetchaburi	เมืองเพชรบุรี	Phetchaburi	เพชรบุรี	West
Chong Sam Mo	ช่องสามหมอ	Kaeng Khro	แก้งคร้อ	Chaiyaphum	ชัยภูมิ	North-East
Chong Sam Mo	ช่องสามหมอ	Khon Sawan	คอนสวรรค์	Chaiyaphum	ชัยภูมิ	North-East
Chong Sarika	ช่องสาริกา	Phatthana Nikhom	พัฒนานิคม	Lopburi	ลพบุรี	Central
Chong Thanon	จองถนน	Khao Chaison	เขาชัยสน	Phatthalung	พัทลุง	South
Chonlakhram	ชลคราม	Don Sak	ดอนสัก	Surat Thani	สุราษฎร์ธานี	South
Chonnabot	ชนบท	Chonnabot	ชนบท	Khon Kaen	ขอนแก่น	North-East
Choporo	จ.ป.ร.	Kra Buri	กระบุรี	Ranong	ระนอง	South
Chorakhe	จระเข้	Nong Ruea	หนองเรือ	Khon Kaen	ขอนแก่น	North-East
Chorakhe Bua	จรเข้บัว	Khet Lat Phrao	ลาดพร้าว	Bangkok	กรุงเทพมหานคร	Central
Chorakhe Hin	จระเข้หิน	Khon Buri	ครบุรี	Nakhon Ratchasima	นครราชสีมา	North-East
Chorakhe Mak	จรเข้มาก	Prakhon Chai	ประโคนชัย	Buriram	บุรีรัมย์	North-East
Chorakhe Phueak	จรเข้เผือก	Dan Makham Tia	ด่านมะขามเตี้ย	Kanchanaburi	กาญจนบุรี	West
Chorakhe Rong	จรเข้ร้อง	Chaiyo	ไชโย	Ang Thong	อ่างทอง	Central
Chorakhe Sam Phan	จรเข้สามพัน	U Thong	อู่ทอง	Suphan Buri	สุพรรณบุรี	Central
Chorakhe Yai	จรเข้ใหญ่	Bang Pla Ma	บางปลาม้า	Suphan Buri	สุพรรณบุรี	Central
Chot Muang	โจดม่วง	Sila Lat	ศิลาลาด	Sisaket	ศรีสะเกษ	North-East
Chot Nong Kae	โจดหนองแก	Phon	พล	Khon Kaen	ขอนแก่น	North-East
Chuap	จวบ	Cho-airong	เจาะไอร้อง	Narathiwat	นราธิวาส	South
Chuea Phloeng	เชื้อเพลิง	Prasat	ปราสาท	Surin	สุรินทร์	North-East
Chuen Chom	ชื่นชม	Chuen Chom	ชื่นชม	Maha Sarakham	มหาสารคาม	North-East
Chum Chang	จุมจัง	Kuchinarai	กุฉินารายณ์	Kalasin	กาฬสินธุ์	North-East
Chum Chang	ชุมช้าง	Phon Phisai	โพนพิสัย	Nong Khai	หนองคาย	North-East
Chum Het	ชุมเห็ด	Mueang Buriram	เมืองบุรีรัมย์	Buriram	บุรีรัมย์	North-East
Chum Kho	ชุมโค	Phato	พะโต๊ะ	Chumphon	ชุมพร	South
Chum Phae	ชุมแพ	Chum Phae	ชุมแพ	Khon Kaen	ขอนแก่น	North-East
Chum Phuang	ชุมพวง	Chum Phuang	ชุมพวง	Nakhon Ratchasima	นครราชสีมา	North-East
Chum Saeng	ชุมแสง	Chum Saeng	ชุมแสง	Nakhon Sawan	นครสวรรค์	Central
Chum Saeng	ชุมแสง	Satuek	สตึก	Buriram	บุรีรัมย์	North-East
Chum Saeng	ชุมแสง	Wang Chan	วังจันทร์	Rayong	ระยอง	East
Chum Saeng	ชุมแสง	Nang Rong	นางรอง	Buriram	บุรีรัมย์	North-East
Chum Saeng	ชุมแสง	Krasang	กระสัง	Buriram	บุรีรัมย์	North-East
Chum Saeng	ชุมแสง	Chom Phra	จอมพระ	Surin	สุรินทร์	North-East
Chum Saeng Songkhram	ชุมแสงสงคราม	Bang Rakam	บางระกำ	Phitsanulok	พิษณุโลก	Central
Chum Ta Bong	ชุมตาบง	Chum Ta Bong	ชุมตาบง	Nakhon Sawan	นครสวรรค์	Central
Chumphon Buri	ชุมพลบุรี	Chumphon Buri	ชุมพลบุรี	Surin	สุรินทร์	North-East
Chumphon	ชุมพล	Sathing Phra	สทิงพระ	Songkhla	สงขลา	South
Chumphon	ชุมพล	Srinagarindra	ศรีนครินทร์	Phatthalung	พัทลุง	South
Chumphon	จุมพล	Phon Phisai	โพนพิสัย	Nong Khai	หนองคาย	North-East
Chumphon	ชุมพร	Moei Wadi	เมยวดี	Roi Et	ร้อยเอ็ด	North-East
Chumphon	ชุมพล	Ongkharak	องครักษ์	Nakhon Nayok	นครนายก	Central
Chumphu Phon	ชุมภูพร	Si Wilai	ศรีวิไล	Bueng Kan	บึงกาฬ	North-East
Chun	จุน	Chun	จุน	Phayao	พะเยา	North

== See also ==
- Administrative divisions of Thailand
- List of districts of Thailand
- List of districts of Bangkok
- List of tambon in Thailand
- Provinces of Thailand
- List of municipalities in Thailand
