= Mae Chan =

Mae Chan in Thailand may refer to:

- Mae Chan District
  - Mae Chan Subdistrict
  - Mae Chan Municipality
- Mae Chan, Umphang, subdistrict in Umphang District, Tak
- Mae Chan Fault, east–west strike fault in Northern Thailand
