= Mae Mo =

Mae Mo may refer to the following places in Thailand:

- Mae Mo District
- Mae Mo, Mae Mo, the seat of the district
