= Saraphi =

Saraphi may refer to:

- Saraphi District
- Saraphi Subdistrict
- Saraphi Municipality
