= Don Kaeo =

Don Kaeo may refer to:

- Don Kaeo, Mae Rim, a tambon (subdistrict) of Mae Rim District, in Chiang Mai Province, Thailand
- Don Kaeo, Saraphi, a tambon (subdistrict) of Saraphi District, in Chiang Mai Province, Thailand
