= Mung =

Mung may refer to:

- Mung (computer term), the act of making several incremental changes to an item that combine to destroy it
- Mung bean, a bean native to Bangladesh, India, and Pakistan
- Mung, common name of the brown algae Pylaiella
- Mung, a dialect or related language of the Phunoi language of Laos
- Mung, malevolent spirits in Mun (religion) of the Lepcha people of Sikkim
- MUNG, ICAO code for Rafael Cabrera Mustelier Airport in Cuba
- MUNG, acronym of Military University Nueva Granada

== People ==
- Mung Chiang (born 1977), Chinese-American electrical engineer and academic administrator
- Lau Mung King, Hong Kong footballer
- Leo II Mung, Archbishop of Ohrid during the 12th century
- Yoyo Mung (born 1975), Hong Kong actress

=== Fictional characters ===
- Mung, Lord of all Deaths, a god in Lord Dunsany's short story collection The Gods of Pegāna
- Mung Daal, a character in the cartoon series Chowder
- Mung the Inconceivable, a member of the Warbound, appearing in Hulk comics
- Mung, Lord Dregg's second-in-command in the cartoon series Teenage Mutant Ninja Turtles

== Places ==
- Ban Mung, a subdistrict in the Noen Maprang District of Phitsanulok Province, Thailand
- Khua Mung, a subdistrict of Saraphi District, in Chiang Mai Province, Thailand
- Le Mung, a commune in southwestern France

== See also ==
- Mungmung, transliteration of the Korean word 멍멍, an onomatopoeia for bark (dog)
- Hmong people
