= Ku Daeng =

Ku Daeng กู่แดง
- Village
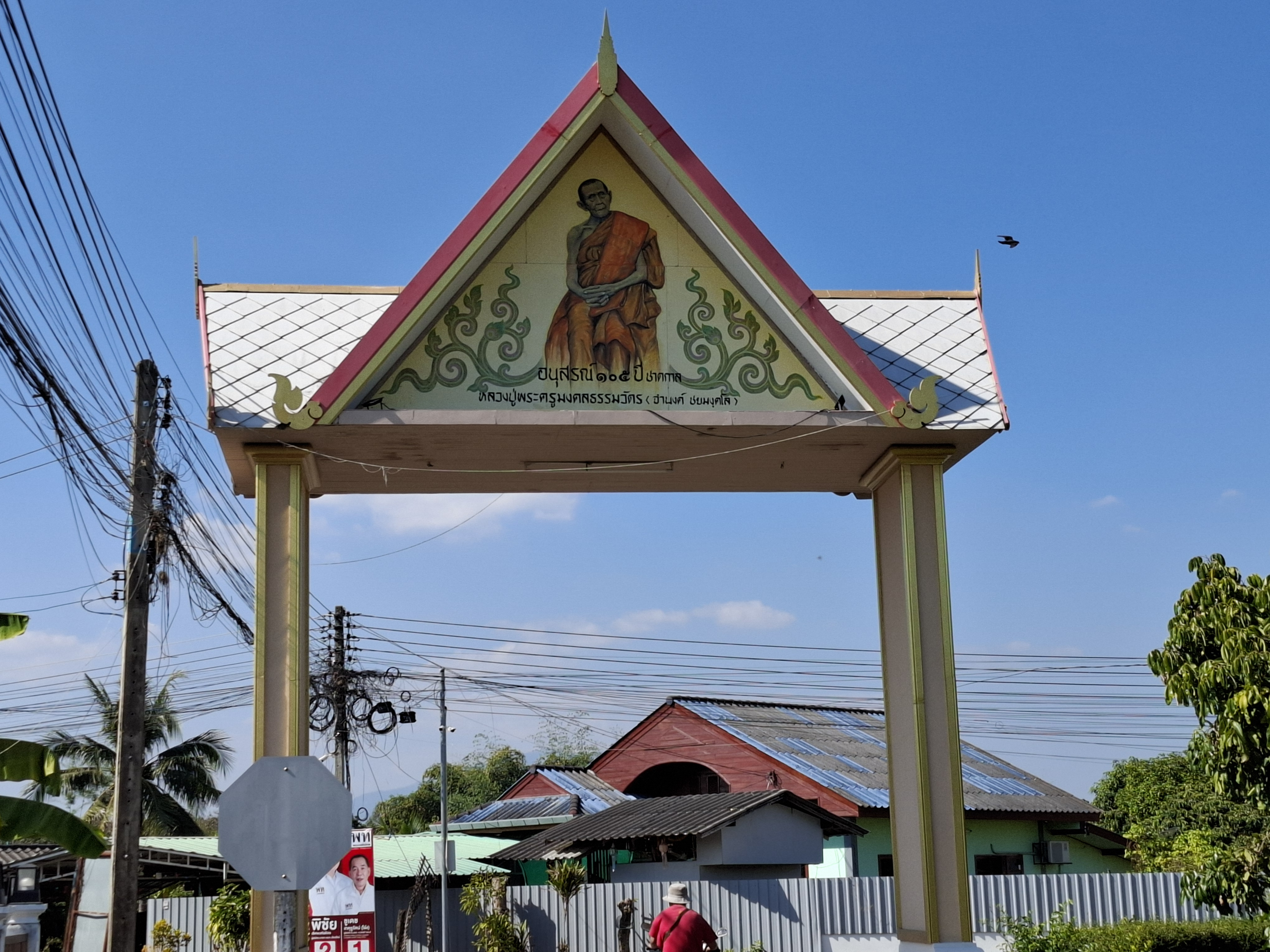
- Interactive map of Ku Daeng
- Coordinates: 18°41′13″N 99°0′40″E
- Country: Thailand
- Province: Chiang Mai
- Amphoe: Saraphi
- Tambon: Nong Faek
- Time zone: UTC+7 (TST)
- Postal code: 50140

Ku Daeng (Thai: กู่แดง), or Ban Ku Daeng (Thai: บ้านกู่แดง), is a village in Nong Faek Subdistrict, Saraphi District, in Chiang Mai Province, Thailand.

== Studies ==
Ku Daeng has been extensively documented in various ethnographic studies conducted by American and Thai anthropologists during the mid and late 20th century.

Ku Daeng village is known for being the subject of Konrad Kingshill's classic 1960 ethnography book Ku Daeng: The Red Tomb, based on his fieldwork in the village in 1953 and 1954. A revised third edition, published in 1976, synthesizes the 1953–1954 study with later studies done in 1964 and 1974. In 1991, Kingshill published a follow-up monograph, Ku Daeng: Thirty Years Later.

From October 1971 to November 1972, Jack M. Potter and Sulamith Heins Potter conducted anthropological fieldwork in Ku Daeng village. Jack M. Potter published Thai Peasant Social Structure in 1976. In 1977, Sulamith Heins Potter published a study of family life in Ku Daeng, Family Life in a Northern Thai Village. Potter (1977) refers to Ku Daeng as "Chiangmai Village" rather than by its original name.

In 1985, two works containing sociological research results from Ku Daeng were published by Thai researchers Werasit Sittitrai and Malee Viriya.

== Administration ==
Administratively, Ku Daeng consists of 2 administrative villages (muban), namely village numbers 6 and 7.

No.	Name	Thai
6.	Ban Ku Daeng	บ้านกู่แดง
7.	Ban Ku Daeng	บ้านกู่แดง

The village is governed by the subdistrict municipality (thesaban tambon) Nong Faek (เทศบาลตำบลหนองแฝก).
