= Si Kham =

Coordinates: 20°12′43″N 99°51′2″E

Si Kham ศรีค้ำ
- Tambon
- Interactive map of Si Kham
- Country: Thailand
- Province: Chiang Rai
- District: Mae Chan

Population (2015)
  - Total: 6,118
- Time zone: UTC+7 (ICT)
- Postal code: 57110
- TIS 1099: 570711

Si Kham (Thai: ศรีค้ำ) is a tambon (subdistrict) of Mae Chan District, in Chiang Rai Province, Thailand. In 2015, it had a population of 6,118 people.

== History ==
The subdistrict was created on 1 August 1984, when ten administrative villages were split off from Pa Sang Subdistrict. One village was split off when the subdistrict Mae Salong Nai was created in 1991.

== Administration ==
=== Central administration ===
The tambon is divided into 11 administrative villages (mubans).

| No. | Name | Thai |
|---|---|---|
| 1. | Ban Mueang Klang | บ้านเหมืองกลาง |
| 2. | Ban Pa Yang | บ้านป่ายาง |
| 3. | Ban Mae Kham Lak Chet | บ้านแม่คำหลักเจ็ด |
| 4. | Ban San Sali Luang | บ้านสันสลีหลวง |
| 5. | Ban Kluai | บ้านกล้วย |
| 6. | Ban San Na Yao | บ้านสันนายาว |
| 7. | Ban Wiang Sa | บ้านเวียงสา |
| 8. | Ban Mae Salong Nok | บ้านแม่สลองนอก |
| 9. | Ban Saen Suk | บ้านแสนสุข |
| 10. | Ban Si Kham | บ้านศรีค้ำ |
| 11. | Ban Rung Charoen | บ้านรุ่งเจริญ |

=== Local administration ===
The area of the subdistrict is covered by the subdistrict administrative organization (SAO) Si Kham (องค์การบริหารส่วนตำบลศรีค้ำ).
