= List of villages of Buriram =

This is a list of villages of the town of Buriram with each village's details.

== Chum Het Village ==
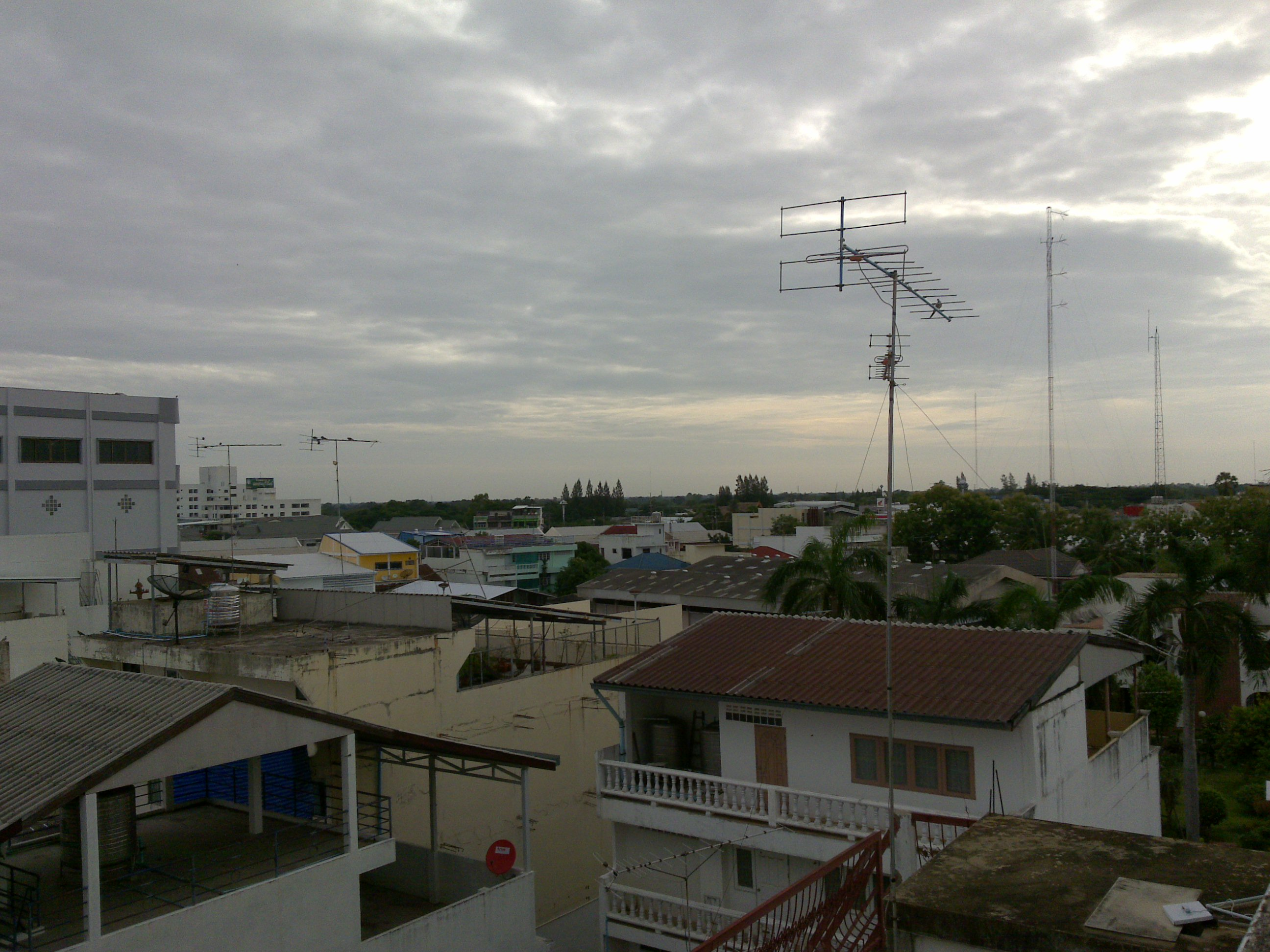
View of Chum Het

Chum Het Village, or Chumchon Chum Het is one of the 19 villages that constitute Buriram, Thailand. It is located in the north of the Town of Buriram, near Chum Het Town. The village is on the Highway no.2074 from Buriram to Phutthaisong.

== Lang Sathanee Rotfai Buriram Village ==
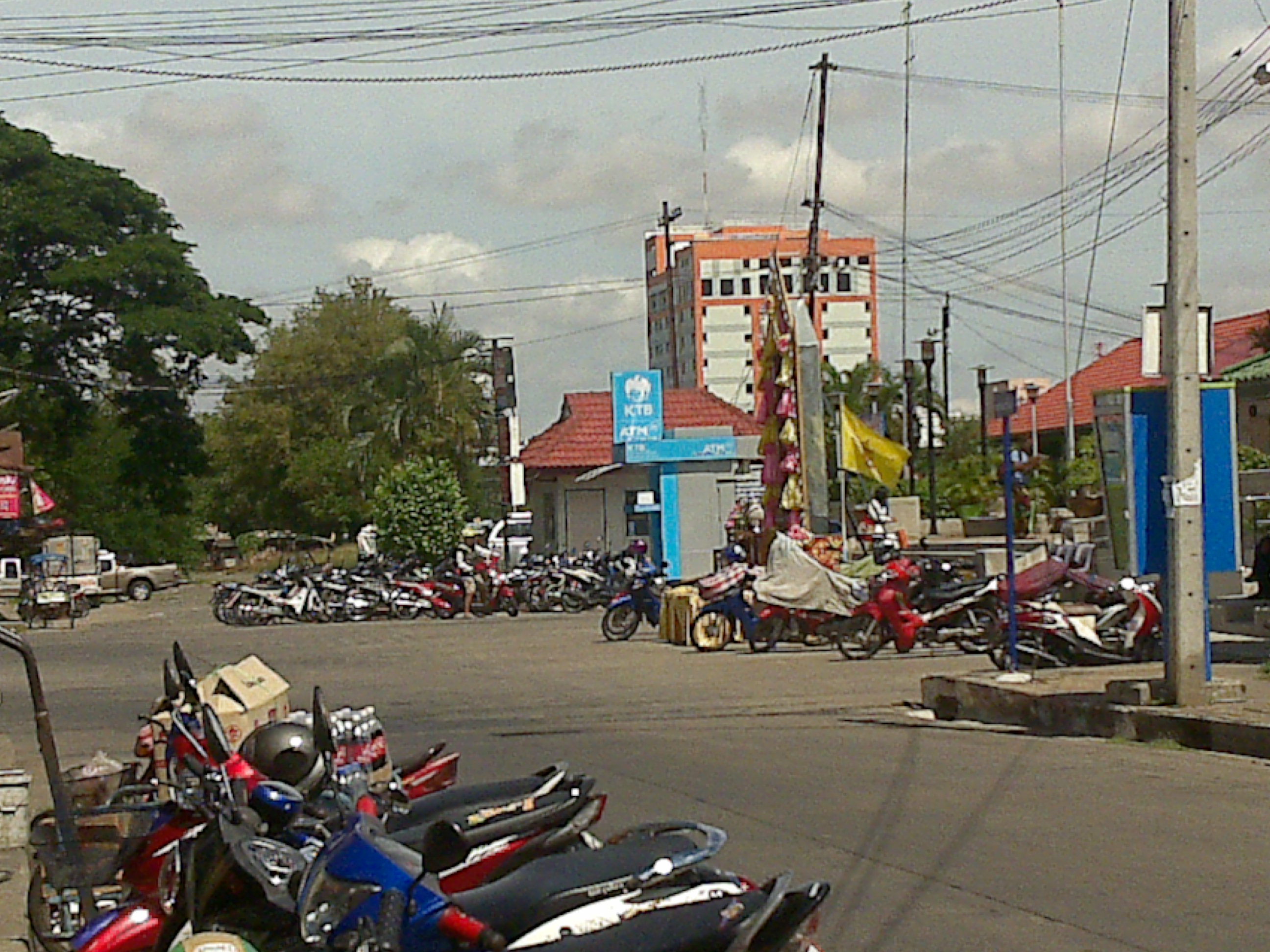
Lang Sathanee Rotfai Buriram Village

Lang Sathanee Rotfai Buriram Village, or Chumchon Lang Sathanee is one of the 19 villages that constitute Buriram, Thailand. It is located in the north of the Town of Buriram. Buriram Railway Station is located in the village.

The village is on northeastern railway line. Main station is Buriram Railway Station.

== Nah Sathanee Rotfai Buriram Village ==
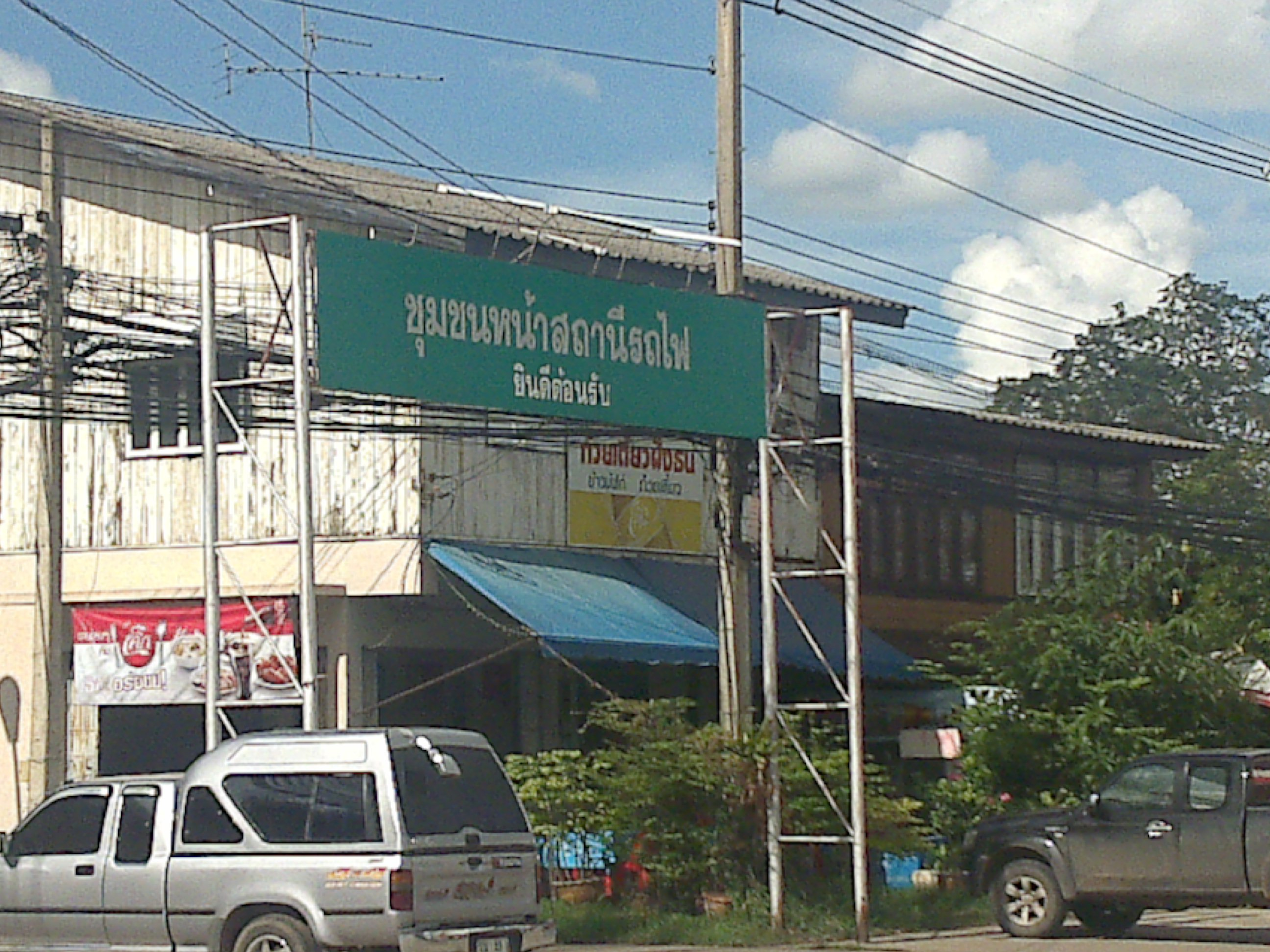
Nah Sathanee Rotfai Buriram Village

Nah Sathanee Rotfai Buriram Village, or Chumchon Nah Sathanee is one of the 19 villages that constitute Buriram, Thailand. It is located in the north of the Town of Buriram. Buriram Railway Station is located in the village.

The village is on northeastern railway line. Main station is Buriram Railway Station.

== Prapa Kao Village ==
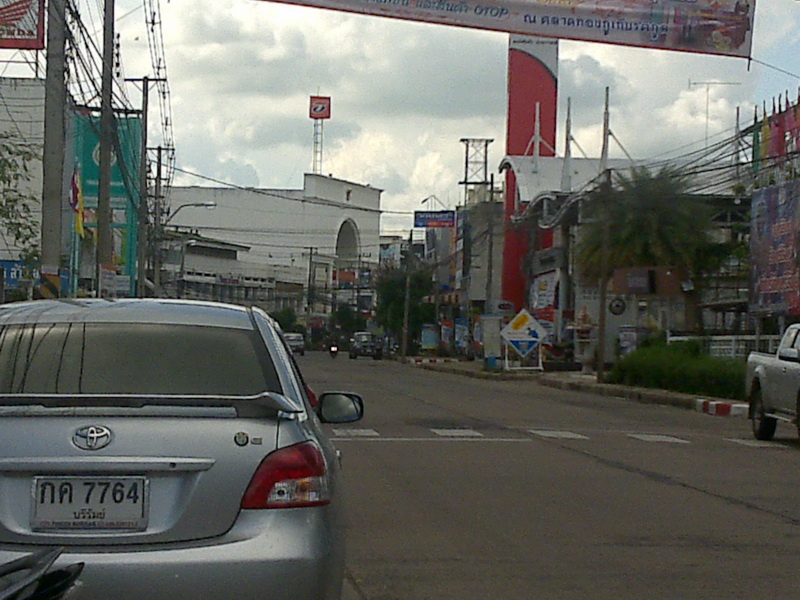
Prapa Kao Village

Prapa Kao Village, or Chumchon Prapa Kao is one of the 19 villages that constitute Buriram, Thailand. It is located in the center of the Town of Buriram. Many banks is located in thai village

The village is on Palad Mueang and Tha Nee Street.

== North Bu Lam Duan Village ==
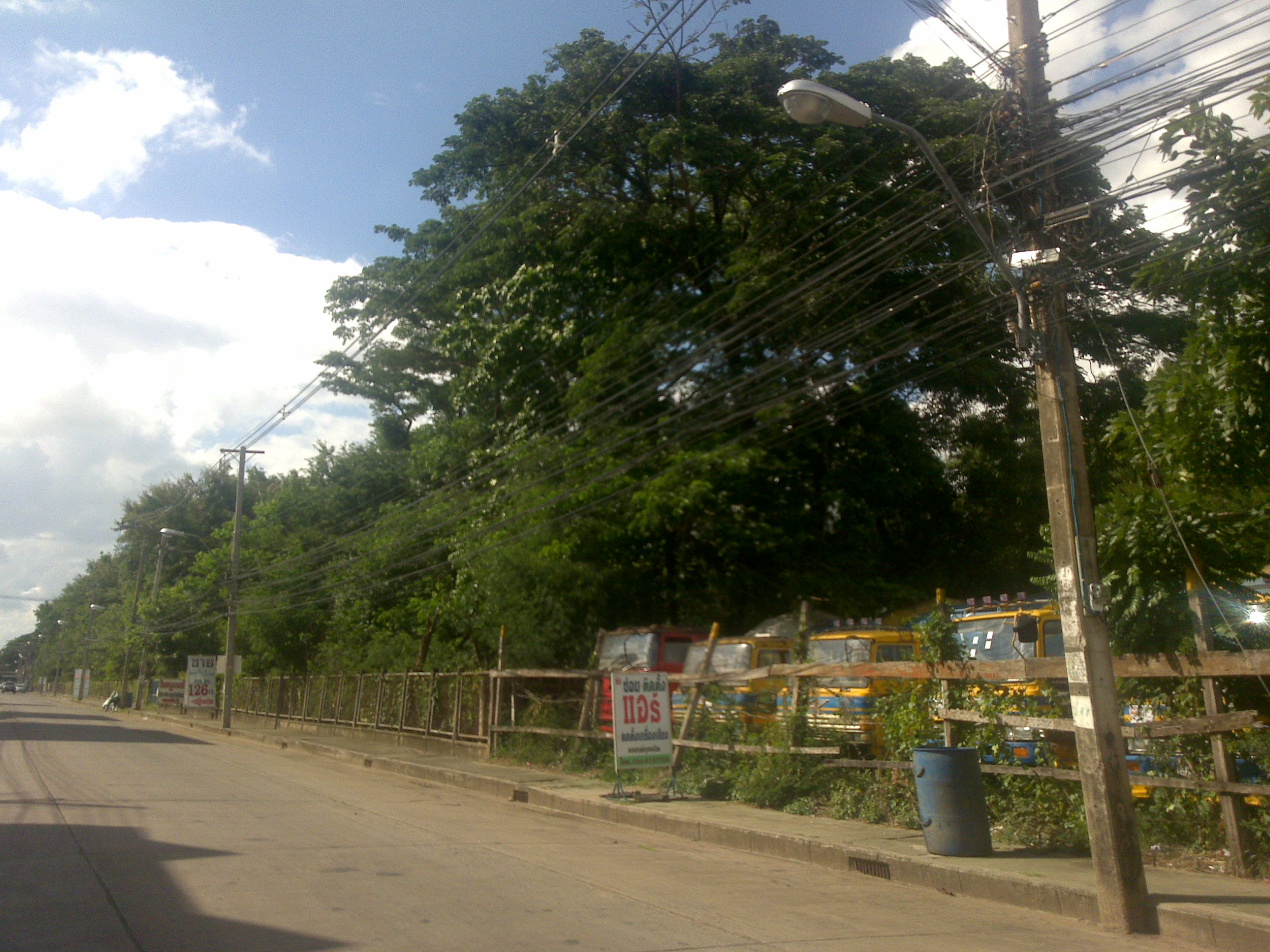
Forest in North Bu Lam Duan Village

North Bu Lam Duan Village, or Chumchon Bu Lam Duan Nuea is one of the 19 villages that constitute Buriram, Thailand. It is located in the west of the Town of Buriram. There are little forest in this village.

The village is on Bu Lam Duan Street.

== South Bu Lam Duan Village ==
South Bu Lam Duan บุลำดวนใต้
- Village
- Country: Thailand
- Province: Buriram Province
- City: Buriram

South Bu Lam Duan Village is one of the 19 villages that constitute Buriram, Thailand. It is located in the southwest of the town, near North Bu Lam Duan Village. The streets passed such as Bu Lam Duan, Saen Suk and Chira. Buriram Bus Station is located near here.

== Lang Buriram Rajabhat University Village ==
Lang Buriram Rajabhat University Village หลังราชภัฏ
- Village
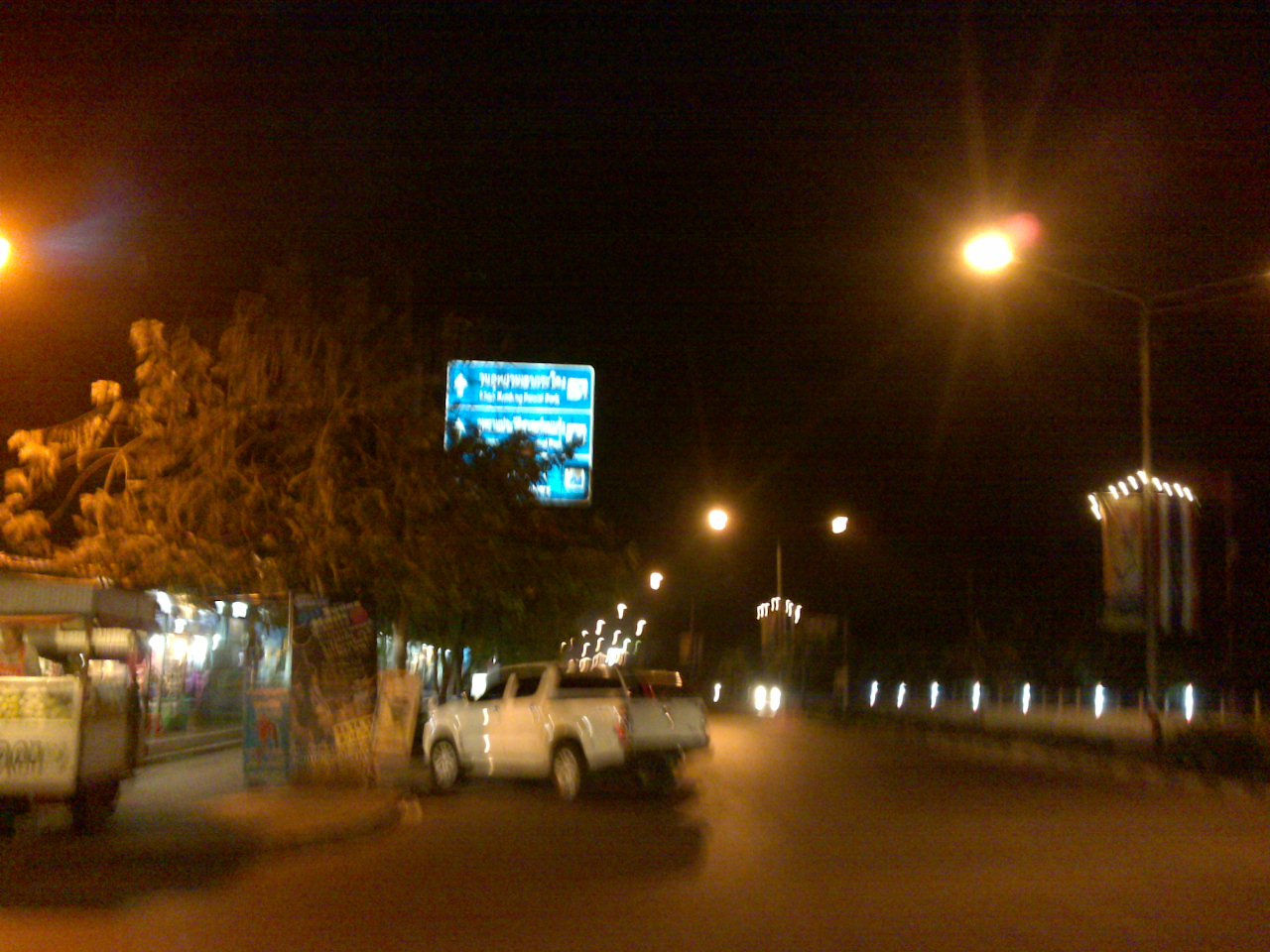
- Country: Thailand
- Province: Buriram Province
- City: Buriram

Lang Buriram Rajabhat University Village is one of the 19 villages that constitute Buriram, Thailand. It is located in the south of the town, near Buriram Rajabhat University. The streets passed such as Sadet Niwat and Chira. Many education academies are located here.

== Ton Sak Village ==
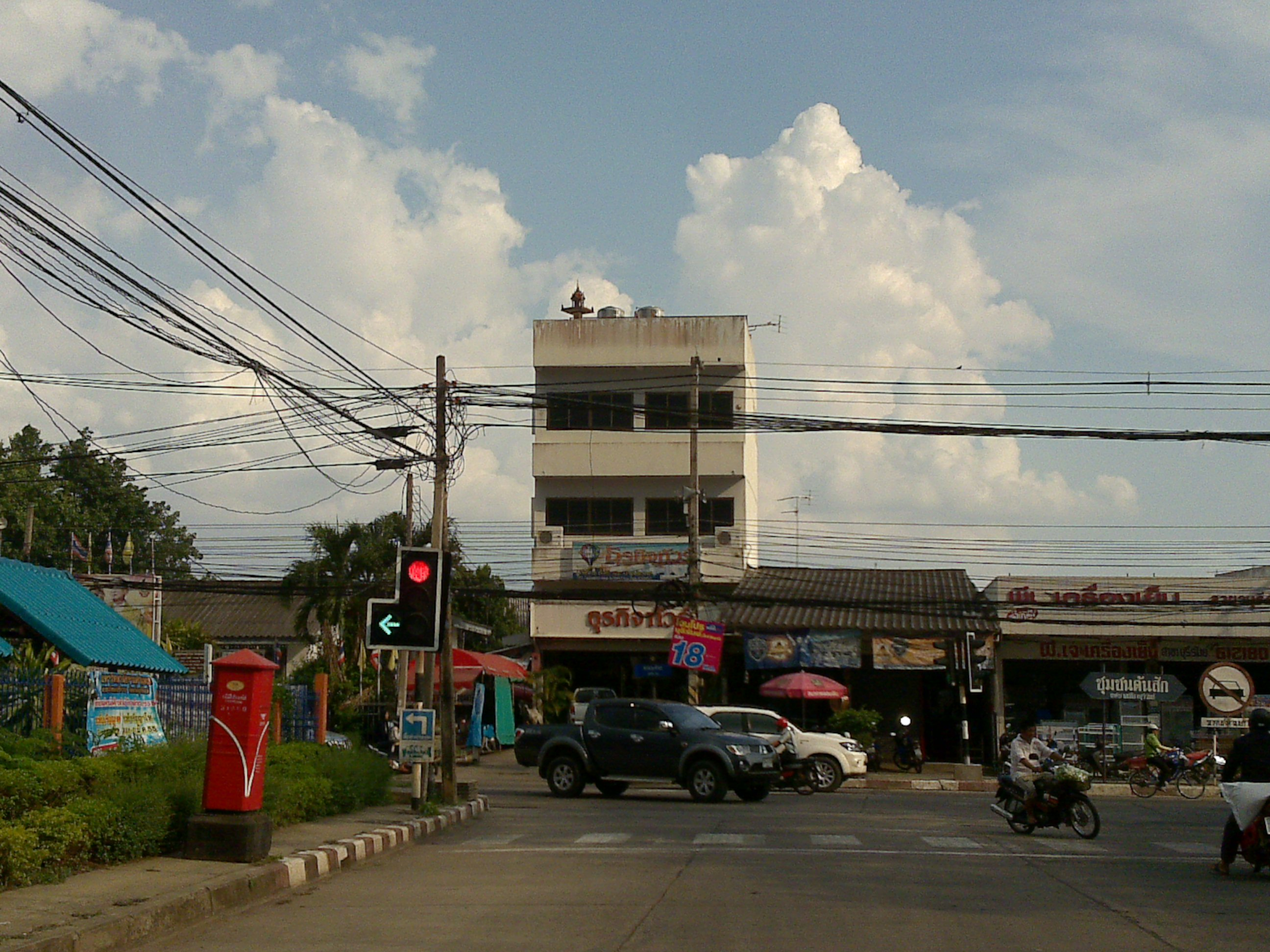
Ton Sak

Ton Sak Village, or Chumchon Ton Sak is one of the 19 villages that constitute Buriram, Thailand. It is located in the south of the Town of Buriram. It is on Palad Mueang and Jira Street. Night Bazaar Market is located in this village.

== Lak Mueang Village ==
Lak Mueang หลักเมือง
- Village
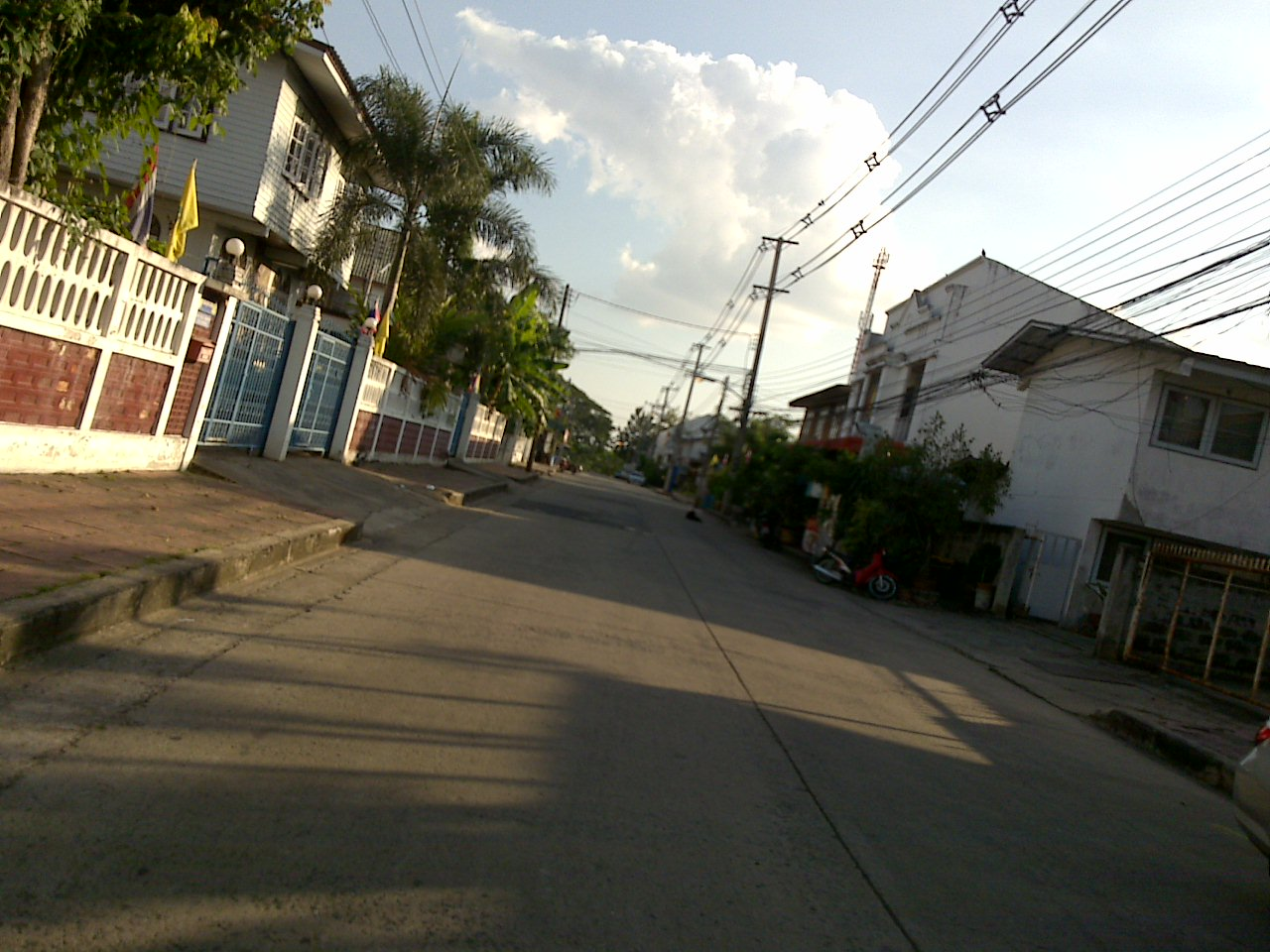
- Country: Thailand
- Province: Buriram Province
- City: Buriram

Lak Mueang Village is one of the 19 villages that constitute Buriram, Thailand. It is located in the southeast of the town, near Buriram City Pillar. The streets passed such as Chira and Lak Mueang. Many temples such as Wat Klang is located here.

== Sa Phan Yaw ==
Sa Phan Yaw สะพานยาว
- Village
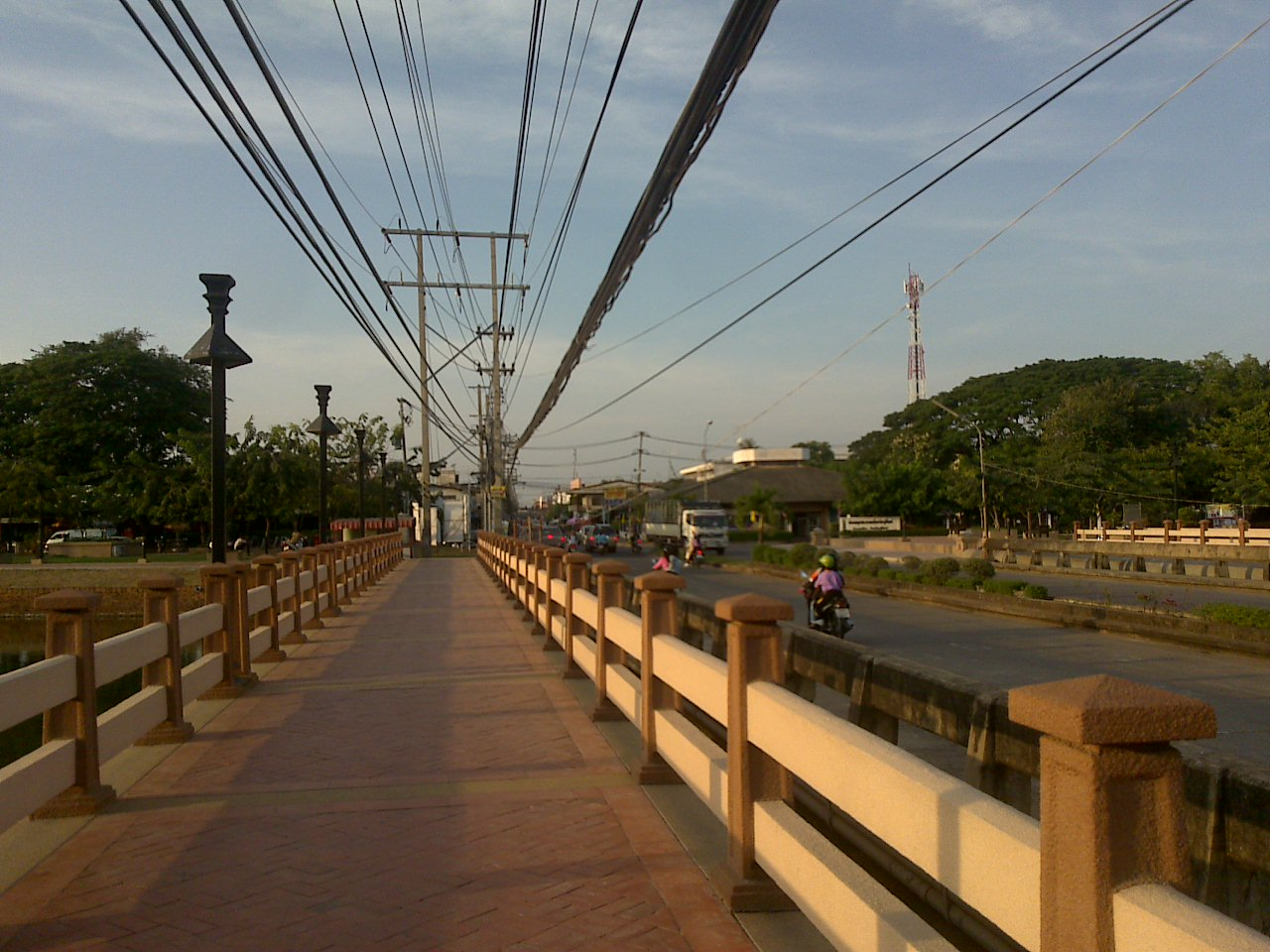
- Country: Thailand
- Province: Buriram Province
- City: Buriram

Sa Phan Yaw is one of the 19 villages that constitute Buriram, Thailand. It is located in the south of the town, near Khlong La Lom. The streets passed such as Anu Wat and Sunthornthep.
