= Ban Dong =

Ban Dong may refer to:

- Ban Dong, Chat Trakan
- Ban Dong, Lampang
