= Mae Salong Nai =

Mae Salong Nai แม่สลองใน
- Tambon
- Location within Thailand
- Coordinates: 20°13′44″N 99°40′12″E
- Country: Thailand
- Province: Chiang Rai
- District: Mae Fa Luang

Population (2015)
  - Total: 25,539
- Time zone: UTC+7 (ICT)
- Postal code: 57110
- TIS 1099: 571502

Mae Salong Nai (Thai: แม่สลองใน) is a tambon (subdistrict) of Mae Fa Luang District, in Chiang Rai Province, Thailand. In 2015 it had a population of 25,539 people.

== History ==
The subdistrict was created effective 29 May 1991 by splitting off seven administrative villages from Pa Sang and Si Kham.

== Administration ==
=== Central administration ===
The tambon is divided into 27 administrative villages (mubans).

No.	Name	Thai
1.	Ban Hin Taek	บ้านหินแตก
2.	Ban Huai Phueng	บ้านห้วยผึ้ง
3.	Ban A Haem	บ้านอาแหม
4.	Ban Hua Mae Kham	บ้านหัวแม่คำ
5.	Ban Huai Mu	บ้านห้วยมุ
6.	Ban Pha Duea	บ้านผาเดื่อ
7.	Ban Saen Chai	บ้านแสนใจ
8.	Ban Huai San	บ้านห้วยส้าน
9.	Ban Huai Yuak Pa So	บ้านห้วยหยวกป่าโซ
10.	Ban Huai Hok	บ้านห้วยหก
11.	Ban Ma Hin Kong	บ้านมะหินกอง
12.	Ban Pha Noi	บ้านพะน้อย
13.	Ban Ton Muang	บ้านต้นม่วง
14.	Ban Lao Lio	บ้านเล่าลิ่ว
15.	Ban A Lae	บ้านอาแหละ
16.	Ban Cha Kham Noi	บ้านจะคำน้อย
17.	Ban Huai Yo	บ้านห้วยโย
18.	Ban Huai Mak	บ้านห้วยหมาก
19.	Ban Saen Laep	บ้านแม่สะแลป
20.	Ban Na To	บ้านนาโต่
21.	Ban Pong Hai	บ้านโป่งไฮ
22.	Ban Saen Chai Phatthana	บ้านแสนใจพัฒนา
23.	Ban San Makhet	บ้านสันมะเค็ด
24.	Ban Sam Yaek Iko	บ้านสามแยกอีก้อ
25.	Ban Molong	บ้านมอล่อง
26.	Ban Huai Kra	บ้านห้วยกระ
27.	Ban Hin Dam	บ้านหินคำ

=== Local administration ===
The area of the subdistrict is covered by the subdistrict administrative organization (SAO) Mae Salong Nai (องค์การบริหารส่วนตำบลแม่สลองใน).
