= Chai Sathan =

Chai Sathan may refer to:

- Chai Sathan, Mueang Nan, Nan Province
- Chai Sathan, Saraphi, Chiang Mai Province
