= Pa Bong =

Pa Bong ป่าบง
- Tambon
- Country: Thailand
- Province: Chiang Mai
- District: Saraphi

Population (2005)
  - Total: 3,506
- Time zone: UTC+7 (ICT)

Pa Bong (Thai: ป่าบง) is a tambon (subdistrict) of Saraphi district, in Chiang Mai province, Thailand. In 2005 it had a population of 3,506 people. The tambon contains six villages.
