= Pa Tueng =

Coordinates: 20°08′02″N 99°49′57″E

Pa Tueng ป่าตึง
- Tambon
- Interactive map of Pa Tueng
- Country: Thailand
- Province: Chiang Rai
- District: Mae Chan

Population (2005)
  - Total: 22,139
- Time zone: UTC+7 (ICT)

Pa Tueng (Thai: ป่าตึง) is a village and tambon (subdistrict) of Mae Chan District, in Chiang Rai Province, Thailand. In 2005 it had a total population of 22,139 people. The tambon contains 22 villages.
