= Nong Phueng =

Nong Phueng หนองผึ้ง
- Tambon
- Interactive map of Nong Phueng
- Coordinates: 18°44′37″N 99°00′48″E
- Country: Thailand
- Province: Chiang Mai
- Amphoe: Saraphi

Population (2020)
  - Total: 15,778
- Time zone: UTC+7 (TST)
- Postal code: 50140
- TIS 1099: 501907

Nong Phueng (Thai: หนองผึ้ง) is a tambon (subdistrict) of Saraphi District, in Chiang Mai Province, Thailand. In 2020 it had a total population of 15,778 people.

== Administration ==
=== Central administration ===
The tambon is subdivided into 8 administrative villages (muban).

No.	Name	Thai
1.	Ban Nong Phueng	บ้านหนองผึ้ง
2.	Ban Chiang Saen	บ้านเชียงแสน
3.	Ban Don Chin	บ้านดอนจืน
4.	Ban Nong Phueng Tai	บ้านหนองผึ้งใต้
5.	Ban Pa Khae Yong	บ้านป่าแคโยง
6.	Ban Kong Sai	บ้านกองทราย
7.	Ban Pa Ket	บ้านป่าเก็ดถี่
8.	Ban San Khue	บ้านสันคือ

=== Local administration ===
The area of the subdistrict is shared by 2 local governments.

- the subdistrict municipality (Thesaban Tambon) Yang Noeng (เทศบาลตำบลยางเนิ้ง)
- the subdistrict municipality (Thesaban Tambon) Nong Phueng (เทศบาลตำบลหนองผึ้ง)
