= Tha Khao Plueak =

Coordinates: 20°09′57″N 99°59′39″E

Tha Khao Plueak ท่าข้าวเปลือก
- Tambon
- Interactive map of Tha Khao Plueak
- Country: Thailand
- Province: Chiang Rai
- District: Mae Chan

Population (2005)
  - Total: 7,510
- Time zone: UTC+7 (ICT)

Tha Khao Plueak (Thai: ท่าข้าวเปลือก) is a village and tambon (subdistrict) of Mae Chan District, in Chiang Rai Province, Thailand. In 2005 it had a population of 7,510 people. The tambon contains 14 villages.
