= Nong Faek =

Nong Faek หนองแฝก
- Tambon
- Interactive map of Nong Faek
- Coordinates: 18°42′N 99°00′E
- Country: Thailand
- Province: Chiang Mai
- Amphoe: Saraphi

Population (2020)
  - Total: 5,957
- Time zone: UTC+7 (TST)
- Postal code: 50140
- TIS 1099: 501906

Nong Faek (Thai: หนองแฝก) is a tambon (subdistrict) of Saraphi District, in Chiang Mai Province, Thailand. In 2020 it had a total population of 5,957 people.

== Administration ==
=== Central administration ===
The tambon is subdivided into 9 administrative villages (muban).

No.	Name	Thai
1.	Ban Nong Si Chaeng	บ้านหนองสี่แจ่ง
2.	Ban San Pa Sak	บ้านสันป่าสัก
3.	Ban Nong Faek	บ้านหนองแฝก
4.	Ban Nong Faek	บ้านหนองแฝก
5.	Ban Nong Faek	บ้านหนองแฝก
6.	Ban Ku Daeng	บ้านกู่แดง
7.	Ban Ku Daeng	บ้านกู่แดง
8.	Ban San Pa Duea	บ้านสันป่าเดื่อ
9.	Ban San Pa Sak Nuea	บ้านสันป่าสักเหนือ

=== Local administration ===
The whole area of the subdistrict is covered by the subdistrict municipality (Thesaban Tambon) Nong Faek (เทศบาลตำบลหนองแฝก).
