= Mae Rai =

Coordinates: 20°15′12″N 99°51′20″E

Mae Rai แม่ไร่
- Tambon
- Interactive map of Mae Rai
- Country: Thailand
- Province: Chiang Rai
- District: Mae Chan

Population (2005)
  - Total: 8,072
- Time zone: UTC+7 (ICT)

Mae Rai (Thai: แม่ไร่) is a village and tambon (subdistrict) of Mae Chan District, in Chiang Rai Province, Thailand. In 2005 it had a population of 8,072 people. The tambon contains eight villages.
