= Sop Pat =

Coordinates: 18°15′N 99°46′E

Sop Pat สบป้าด
- Subdistrict
- Interactive map of Sop Pat
- Country: Thailand
- Province: Lampang
- District: Mae Mo District

Population (2005)
  - Total: 5,905
- Time zone: UTC+7 (ICT)

Sop Pat (Thai: สบป้าด) is a village and tambon (sub-district) of Mae Mo District, in Lampang Province, Thailand. In 2005 it had a population of 5,905. The tambon contains seven villages.
