= San Sai, Mae Chan =

Coordinates: 20°10′21″N 99°52′23″E

San Sai สันทราย
- Tambon
- Interactive map of San Sai
- Country: Thailand
- Province: Chiang Rai
- District: Mae Chan

Population (2005)
  - Total: 2,419
- Time zone: UTC+7 (ICT)

San Sai, Mae Chan (Thai: สันทราย) is a village and tambon (subdistrict) of Mae Chan District, in Chiang Rai Province, Thailand. In 2005 it had a population of 2,419 people. The tambon contains nine villages.
