= Mae Chan Fault =

Strike-slip fault in Thailand and Laos

Mae Chan Fault is an active 118 km long west-southwest–east-northeast trending left lateral strike-slip fault in Northern Thailand that extends into western Laos. It was responsible for a 6.3 magnitude quake in Laos on May 16, 2007, that caused property damage as far as Chiang Rai in Thailand. A part of it stretches from Mae Chan to Mae Ai for 40 km along the highway, then goes through Fang, Chiang Dao, Mae Rim and San Kamphaeng districts of Chiang Mai, to Mae Tha district of Lamphun.

== Tectonic setting ==
It lies within the complex zone of collision between the Indian plate and the Eurasian plate. The orientation of this plate boundary is highly oblique to the direction of movement of the two plates. This has resulted in an area of dominantly strike-slip tectonics with the north–south trending right lateral Sagaing Fault and the northwest–southeast trending right lateral Red River Fault being the largest structures. The block between these two major fault zones is characterised by west–east extension combined with a set of sub-parallel west-southwest–east-northeast trending left lateral strike-slip faults, giving an overall transtensional setting. This set includes the Jinghong Fault stretching from Kengtung, Myanmar to Xishuangbanna, Yunnan, the Nan Ma Fault, Muang Houn Fault, and Dien Bien Phu Fault.

== Seismic hazard ==
It has become "more active" since the 2004 Indian Ocean earthquake. The 2011 Tarlay earthquake originated 20–30 kilometres (12–19 mi) north of this fault, most likely on the roughly parallel Nam Ma Fault, killing over 100 people.

A Japanese study found that it is capable of producing a 7.0 magnitude quake, and is considered as one of two of the most "worrying" faults in Thailand.
