= Mae Kham =

Coordinates: 20°13′21″N 99°51′22″E

Mae Kham แม่คำ
- Tambon
- Interactive map of Mae Kham
- Country: Thailand
- Province: Chiang Rai
- District: Mae Chan

Population (2005)
  - Total: 11,569
- Time zone: UTC+7 (ICT)

Mae Kham (Thai: แม่คำ) is a village and tambon (subdistrict) of Mae Chan District, in Chiang Rai Province, Thailand. In 2005 it had a population of 11,569 people. The tambon contains 13 villages.
