= Na Sak =

Na Sak นาสัก
- Subdistrict
- Interactive map of Na Sak
- Country: Thailand
- Province: Lampang
- District: Mae Mo District

Population (2005)
  - Total: 6,261
- Time zone: UTC+7 (ICT)

Na Sak (Thai: นาสัก) is a village and tambon (sub-district) of Mae Mo District, in Lampang Province, Thailand. In 2005 it had a population of 6,261. The tambon contains eight villages.
