= Tha Kwang =

Tha Kwang ท่ากว้าง
- Tambon
- Interactive map of Tha Kwang
- Country: Thailand
- Province: Chiang Mai
- District: Saraphi

Population (2005)
  - Total: 2,856
- Time zone: UTC+7 (ICT)

Tha Kwang (Thai: ท่ากว้าง) is a tambon (subdistrict) of Saraphi District, in Chiang Mai Province, Thailand. In 2005 it had a population of 2,856 people. The tambon contains seven villages.
