= San Sai, Saraphi =

San Sai สันทราย
- Tambon
- Country: Thailand
- Province: Chiang Mai
- District: Saraphi

Population (2005)
  - Total: 5,635
- Time zone: UTC+7 (ICT)

San Sai (Thai: สันทราย) is a tambon (subdistrict) of Saraphi District, in Chiang Mai Province, Thailand. In 2005 it had a population of 5,635 people. The tambon contains 12 villages.
