= Tha Wang Tan =

Tha Wang Tan ท่าวังตาล
- Tambon
- Interactive map of Tha Wang Tan
- Coordinates: 18°44′42″N 98°59′39″E
- Country: Thailand
- Province: Chiang Mai
- Amphoe: Saraphi

Population (2020)
  - Total: 11,039
- Time zone: UTC+7 (TST)
- Postal code: 50140
- TIS 1099: 501910

Tha Wang Tan (Thai: ท่าวังตาล) is a tambon (subdistrict) of Saraphi District, in Chiang Mai Province, Thailand. In 2020 it had a total population of 11,039 people.

== Administration ==
=== Central administration ===
The tambon is subdivided into 13 administrative villages (muban).

No.	Name	Thai
1.	Ban Chedi Liam	บ้านเจดีย์เหลี่ยม
2.	Ban Pa Po	บ้านป่าเปอะ
3.	Ban Klang	บ้านกลาง
4.	Ban Pong	บ้านโป่ง
5.	Ban Pa Ngio	บ้านป่างิ้ว
6.	Ban Pa Sao	บ้านป่าเส้า
7.	Ban Buak Hua Chang	บ้านบวกหัวช้าง
8.	Ban Buak Khrok Nuea	บ้านบวกครกเหนือ
9.	Ban Buak Khrok Tai	บ้านบวกครกใต้
10.	Ban San Pak Wao	บ้านสันป่ากว๋าว
11.	Ban Chang Kham	บ้านช้างค้ำ
12.	Ban Hang Khwae	บ้านหางแคว
13.	Ban Pa Kluai	บ้านป่ากล้วย

=== Local administration ===
The whole area of the subdistrict is covered by the subdistrict municipality (Thesaban Tambon) Tha Wang Tan (เทศบาลตำบลท่าวังตาล).
