= Yang Noeng =

Yang Noeng ยางเนิ้ง
- Tambon
- Country: Thailand
- Province: Chiang Mai
- District: Saraphi

Population (2005)
  - Total: 8,964
- Time zone: UTC+7 (ICT)

Yang Noeng (Thai: ยางเนิ้ง) is a tambon (subdistrict) of Saraphi District, in Chiang Mai Province, Thailand. In 2005 it had a population of 8,964 people. The tambon contains seven villages.
