= 2011 Shan earthquake =

Earthquake affecting Myanmar and Thailand

- Location within Myanmar
- UTC time: 2011-03-24 13:55:13
- ISC event: 16357310
- USGS-ANSS: ComCat
- Local date: 24 March 2011
- Local time: 20:25:13 (UTC+06:30)
- Magnitude: 6.8 M_{w}
- Depth: 10 km (6.21 mi)
- Epicenter: 20.665°N 99.885°E
- Areas affected: Myanmar, Thailand, Laos, China
- Total damage: $475 million (2011 USD)
- Max. intensity: MMI X (Extreme)
- Casualties: 75–151 killed, 212 injured

The 2011 Shan earthquake occurred on 24 March in Shan State, Myanmar. The earthquake measured M_{w} 6.8 and had an epicenter northwest of the border between Myanmar, Thailand and Laos. It occurred in a region accommodating tectonic deformation brought by the collision between the Indo-Australian and Eurasian plates. Strike-slip faulting along the Nan Ma Fault was identified as the cause. There were between 75 and 151 fatalities; including one death in Thailand. An additional 212 people were injured. Hundreds of buildings and some transport infrastructure were damaged in Myanmar and Thailand. In the aftermath of the disaster, the Burmese government provided aid and relief supplies to the affected region. Neighbouring countries China, India and Thailand provided monetary assistance. Several international humanitarian organizations also supported in the relief and recovery.

== Tectonic setting ==
Myanmar lies at the junction of the Alpine–Himalayan Orogenic Belt and Indonesian Island Arc System. In northern Myanmar, continental collision is ongoing between the northward moving Indian plate and the Eurasian plate. Collision also occurs along the Indo-Burman Ranges (Patkai, Naga and Chin Hills) and Arakan Mountains of western Myanmar. In this zone of highly oblique collision, most of the motion is accommodated by the north–south trending Sagaing Fault, a major right-lateral strike-slip fault that runs through the western and central part of Myanmar. Additional deformation is distributed and accommodated within eastern Myanmar and Thailand extending into Laos. Deformation within the Shan Plateau is partly accommodated by a set of southwest–northeast trending left-lateral strike-slip faults. Major faults in the Shan Plateau include the Mae Chan, Nam Ma, Menxing, Menglian, Nantinghe, Wanding, and Longling faults. The faults closest to the epicenter are the Mae Chan and Nam Ma faults, about 400 km (250 mi) east of the Sagaing Fault.

== Earthquake ==
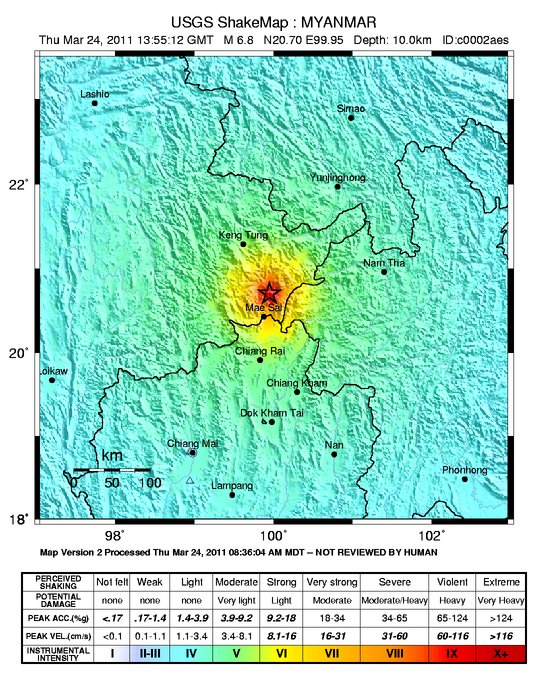
Strong ground motion map

The M_{w} 6.8 earthquake occurred with a focal depth of 10 km (6.2 mi) and epicenter north-northwest of Tachilek, Shan State; north of the Golden Triangle region. It was one of the largest earthquake recorded in the area. A focal mechanism solution obtained for the earthquake indicated left-lateral slip along a vertical fault plane. Large earthquakes also struck the area in 1988 (M_{w} 7.0) and 1995 (M_{w} 6.8).

=== Geology ===
The northeast–southwest trending Nan Ma Fault runs through Myanmar, northern Laos and China for a length of 215 km (134 mi). Geomorphic studies along the central section of the fault where the Mekong River crosses it suggest it was previously a right-lateral fault. It produced up to 30 km (19 mi) of right-lateral displacement between 5 and 20 million years ago. The fault reactivated as a left-lateral fault and its average slip rate is estimated at 0.6–2.4 mm (0.024–0.094 in) per year. The fault branches from a single structure into multiple subparallel splay segments at its westernmost end. The earthquake ruptured one of these segments at the westernmost Nan Ma Fault.

=== Surface rupture ===
The mainshock produced a 30 km (19 mi) long surface rupture along the westernmost segment of the Nam Ma Fault. The surface offset peaked at almost 2 m (6 ft 7 in). Based on inferring InSAR data, the coseismic slip along the fault rupture was concentrated within the shallow 10 km (6.2 mi) of the crust. The maximum slip was estimated at 4 m (13 ft) at depths of 3–5 km (1.9–3.1 mi). Clear surface faulting was observed on farmland; at the paddy fields 16 km (9.9 mi) southeast of the epicenter, 2 km (1.2 mi) of surface rupture was mapped. The measured offset ranged between 0.12 m (4.7 in) and 1.25 m (4 ft 1 in) with an average of 0.81 m (2 ft 8 in). In Tarlay, offsets were in the order of several tens of centimetres.

=== Ground motion ===
The earthquake was associated with 24 seconds of significant ground motion. Resonance may have occurred in the frequency range of 1.82–2.1, affecting many low to medium-rise buildings. The horizontal ground motion was the primary cause of building destruction during the earthquake. The highest peak ground acceleration, 0.20 g, was instrumentally measured 28 km (17 mi) south of the epicenter in Mae Sai, Thailand. This measurement was the highest ever recorded in Thailand from an earthquake. Damage in Tarlay corresponded to a Modified Mercalli intensity (MMI) of VIII (Severe), while damage to a road about 30 km (19 mi) from the epicenter was given MMI X (Extreme).

== Impact ==
The death toll in Myanmar stood at 74 to 150; 212 people were injured; 3,152 made homeless; and 18,000 were affected. Total damage of the earthquake was estimated at 3 billion kyat (US$475 million). At least 413 buildings were damaged and one bridge collapsed in Shan State. Around 90 villages were moderately or heavily damaged; in 50 of those villages, more than half the building stock were damaged or destroyed. In 40 other villages, damage was more than 30 percent of all buildings. At least 40 people died and 50 others were injured in Tarlay; one hospital collapsed in the town. Ground subsidence of 1.5 m (4 ft 11 in) was observed at a bridge between Kengtung and Tachileik. In Tachileik, two people died and six were injured. Twenty-five people died and 57 were injured when a Baptist church collapsed during a service in Kyakuni village. In Monglin, at least 128 homes were razed. Fourteen Buddhist monasteries and nine government infrastructure were damaged.

In Mae Sai, Thailand, one person died when a wall collapsed. Sixteen people, including seven Burmese and five Chinese nationals were also injured. Buildings in the district cracked and the spire of an 11th-century stupa toppled. No structural collapses occurred but ground effects such as liquefaction and lateral spreading were observed. The MMI in Mae Sai corresponded to VI (Strong). Shaking also caused panic in Chiang Rai and Bangkok. In Hanoi, Vietnam, windows shattered and some people evacuated from their homes. Strong shaking was felt in the provinces of Luang Namtha and Bokeo in Laos without casualties or damage. In Xishuangbanna Prefecture, Yunnan, some homes and schools cracked. Tall buildings were temporarily evacuated in Chiang Rai, Menghai County, Nanning and Hanoi.

On 28 March, The Irrawaddy reported many injured survivors at the Tachilek Hospital had "disappeared". The hospital was overwhelmed by an estimated 700 patients a day before the alleged disappearances. Remaining patients and hospital workers said the survivors were "sent away" by local authorities after journalists reported and distributed media on damage and casualties. Locals also reported up to 200 may have died in Shan State.

== Aftermath ==
Most residents in Tachileik spent the night outdoors after being advised by government officials about aftershocks through loudspeakers. Many people in the town did not return to their homes and businesses were closed. Authorities were hampered by road closures in their effort to locate some injured people in the affected areas. The United Nations Office for the Coordination of Humanitarian Affairs received reports of intermittent disruption of services including power, water and telecommunications. A damaged bridge at Tarlay made access to the town challenging for aid and rescue.

More than US$3 million had been donated by various countries and organizations for the relief effort. The government of Myanmar provided Ks 1,162 million worth of supplies to the area. On 25 March, the Ministry of Social Welfare, Relief and Resettlement supplied relief tents, tarpaulins, blankets, clothing and food items via a military plane. Two days later, government officials visited Tachilek and Tarlay, meeting affected residents. Affected families were also handled cash assistance, clothing and food. Patients at the Tachilek Station Hospital were also given cash. Government officials also surveyed repair works at the Kengtung–Tachilek Union Highway, Tachilek–Tahlay Road and Tahlay Bridge. By the afternoon of 27 March, buses and small vehicles could drive along the roads and bridge.

The Chinese government provided US$500 thousand in disaster relief and reconstruction of damaged infrastructure. On 26 March, the Thai government donated ฿3 million to the Burmese government and announced further assistance would be provided. India's prime minister Manmohan Singh said his government would provide US$1 million for "relief and rehabilitation" in the affected area. Korea also donated US$200 thousand to the Myanmar Red Cross Society. Malteser International provided €10 thousand in emergency relief; at its Yangon warehouse, shelters and non-food items were prepared for 300 families. World Vision distributed water and food to over 1,300 residents.

== See also ==
- List of earthquakes in 2011
- List of earthquakes in Myanmar
- List of earthquakes in Thailand
- 1912 Maymyo earthquake
