= Ban Dong, Lampang =

Ban Huai Luang Ban Huai Luang
- Subdistrict
- Interactive map of Ban Huai Luang
- Coordinates: 18.418978°N 99.727320°E
- Country: Thailand
- Province: Lampang
- District: Mae Mo District

Population (2005)
  - Total: 4,677
- Time zone: UTC+7 (ICT)

Ban Dong, Lampang (Thai: บ้านดง) is a village and tambon (sub-district) of Mae Mo District, in Lampang Province, Thailand. In 2005 it had a population of 4,677 people. The tambon contains eight villages.
