= Mae Mo subdistrict =

Mae Mo แม่เมาะ
- Subdistrict
- Country: Thailand
- Province: Lampang
- District: Mae Mo District

Population (2005)
  - Total: 16,589
- Time zone: UTC+7 (ICT)

Mae Mo (Thai: แม่เมาะ) is a village and tambon (subdistrict) of Mae Mo District, in Lampang Province, Thailand. In 2005, it had a population of 16,589 people. The tambon contains eight villages.
