= Saraphi subdistrict =

Saraphi สารภีสารภี
- Tambon
- Country: Thailand
- Province: Chiang Mai
- District: Saraphi

Population (2005)
  - Total: 6,959
- Time zone: UTC+7 (ICT)

Saraphi (Thai: สารภีสารภี) is a tambon (subdistrict) of Saraphi District, in Chiang Mai Province, Thailand. In 2005 it had a population of 6,959 people. The tambon contains nine villages.

== Etymology ==
Saraphi is the Thai name for a tree, Mammea siamensis.
