= Chang Nuea =

Chang Nuea จางเหนือ
- Subdistrict
- Country: Thailand
- Province: Lampang
- District: Mae Mo District

Population (2005)
  - Total: 5,336
- Time zone: UTC+7 (ICT)

Chang Nuea (Thai: จางเหนือ) is a village and tambon (sub-district) in Mae Mo District, in Lampang Province, Thailand. In 2005, it had a population of 5,336. The tambon contains six villages.
