= Chom Sawan =

Coordinates: 20°11′50″N 99°54′34″E

Chom Sawan จอมสวรรค์
- Tambon
- Interactive map of Chom Sawan
- Country: Thailand
- Province: Chiang Rai
- District: Mae Chan

Population (2005)
  - Total: 4,285
- Time zone: UTC+7 (ICT)

Chom Sawan (Thai: จอมสวรรค์) is a village and tambon (subdistrict) of Mae Chan District, in Chiang Rai Province, Thailand. In 2005, it had a population of 4,285 people. The tambon contains 10 villages.
