= Khua Mung =

Khua Mung ขัวมุง
- Tambon
- Country: Thailand
- Province: Chiang Mai
- District: Saraphi

Population (2005)
  - Total: 5,510
- Time zone: UTC+7 (ICT)

Khua Mung (Thai: ขัวมุง) is a tambon (subdistrict) of Saraphi District, in Chiang Mai Province, Thailand. In 2005 it had a population of 5,510 people. The tambon contains 10 villages.
