= Chedi Luang =

Chedi Luang เจดีย์หลวง
- Tambon
- Country: Thailand
- Province: Chiang Rai
- District: Mae Suai

Population (2005)
  - Total: 7,314
- Time zone: UTC+7 (ICT)

Chedi Luang (Thai: เจดีย์หลวง) is a village and tambon (sub-district) of Mae Suai District, in Chiang Rai Province, Thailand. In 2005, it had a population of 7,314 people. The tambon contains 12 villages.
