= Chan Chwa Tai =

Coordinates: 20°13′22″N 99°56′48″E

Chan Chwa Tai จันจว้าใต้
- Tambon
- Interactive map of Chan Chwa Tai
- Country: Thailand
- Province: Chiang Rai
- District: Mae Chan

Population (2005)
  - Total: 8,700
- Time zone: UTC+7 (ICT)

Chan Chwa Tai (Thai: จันจว้าใต้, pronounced [t͡ɕān t͡ɕwâː tâːj]) is a village and tambon (subdistrict) of Mae Chan District, in Chiang Rai Province, Thailand. In 2005, it had a population of 8,700 people. The tambon contains 12 villages.
