= Charoen Mueang =

Coordinates: 19.6075°N 99.7547°E

Charoen Mueang เจริญเมือง
- Tambon
- Interactive map of Charoen Mueang
- Country: Thailand
- Province: Chiang Rai
- District: Phan

Population (2005)
  - Total: 8,534
- Time zone: UTC+7 (ICT)

Charoen Mueang (Thai: เจริญเมือง) is a village and tambon (subdistrict) of Phan District, in Chiang Rai Province, Thailand. In 2005, it had a population of 8,534 people. The tambon contains 21 villages.
