= Don Kaeo, Saraphi =

Coordinates: 18.6905°N 98.9935°E

Don Kaeo ดอนแก้ว
- Tambon
- Interactive map of Don Kaeo
- Country: Thailand
- Province: Chiang Mai
- District: Saraphi

Population (2005)
  - Total: 3,913
- Time zone: UTC+7 (ICT)

Don Kaeo (Thai: ดอนแก้ว) is a tambon (subdistrict) of Saraphi District, in Chiang Mai Province, Thailand. In 2005, it had a population of 3,913 people. The tambon contains seven villages.
