= Chan Chwa =

Coordinates: 20°15′00″N 99°58′42″E

Chan Chwa จันจว้า
- Tambon
- Interactive map of Chan Chwa
- Country: Thailand
- Province: Chiang Rai
- District: Mae Chan

Population (2016)
  - Total: 7,104
- Time zone: UTC+7 (ICT)
- Postal code: 57270
- TIS 1099: 570702

Chan Chwa (Thai: จันจว้า, pronounced [t͡ɕān t͡ɕwâː]) is a tambon (subdistrict) of Mae Chan District, in Chiang Rai Province, Thailand. In 2016, it had a population of 7,104 people.

== Administration ==
=== Central administration ===
The tambon is divided into 11 administrative villages (mubans).

No.	Name	Thai
1.	Ban Mai	บ้านใหม่
2.	Ban Sai Mun	บ้านทรายมูล
3.	Ban Mae Kham Nam Lat	บ้านแม่คำน้ำลัด
4.	Ban Huai Nam Rak	บ้านห้วยน้ำราก
5.	Ban Huai Nam Rak	บ้านห้วยน้ำราก
6.	Ban Dong	บ้านดง
7.	Ban Ton Yang	บ้านต้นยาง
8.	Ban Nong Rong	บ้านหนองร่อง
9.	Ban Huai Nam Rak	บ้านห้วยน้ำราก
10.	Ban San Na	บ้านสันนา
11.	Ban Nong Bua Hua Fai	บ้านหนองบัวหัวฝาย

=== Local administration ===
The area of the subdistrict is covered by the subdistrict municipality (thesaban tambon) Chan Chwa (เทศบาลตำบลจันจว้า).
