= Mae Chan subdistrict =

Coordinates: 20°09′N 99°51′E

Mae Chan แม่จัน
- Tambon
- Interactive map of Mae Chan
- Country: Thailand
- Province: Chiang Rai
- District: Mae Chan

Population (2013)
  - Total: 10,835
- Time zone: UTC+7 (ICT)
- Postal code: 57110
- TIS 1099: 570701

Mae Chan Subdistrict (Thai: แม่จัน) is a tambon (sub-district) of Mae Chan District, in Chiang Rai Province, Thailand. In 2013 it had a population of 10,835.

== Administration ==
The sub-district is divided into 14 administrative villages (mubans).

| No. | Name | Thai |
|---|---|---|
| 1. | Ban Rong Phak Nam | บ้านร้องผักหนาม |
| 2. | Ban Mae Chan | บ้านแม่จัน |
| 3. | Ban Mae Chan Talat | บ้านแม่จันตลาด |
| 4. | Ban Den Pa Sak | บ้านเด่นป่าสัก |
| 5. | Ban Pong Tong | บ้านปงตอง |
| 6. | Ban Huai Wiang Wai | บ้านห้วยเวียงหวาย |
| 7. | Ban Mueang Ho | บ้านเหมืองฮ่อ |
| 8. | Ban Sala | บ้านศาลา |
| 9. | Ban Nong Waen | บ้านหนองแว่น |
| 10. | Ban Huai Cho - Cho Pa Kha | บ้านห้วยโจ้-จอป่าคา |
| 11. | Ban Pong O | บ้านปงอ้อ |
| 12. | Ban San Mongkhon | บ้านสันมงคล |
| 13. | Ban Tham Charik | บ้านธรรมจาริก |
| 14. | Ban Cho Pa Kha | บ้านจอป่าคา |

As the local government, the sub-district municipality Mae Chan Municipality covers about 2 km^{2} of the most urban parts of the sub-district along Phahonyothin Road, whereas the sub-district administrative organization (TAO) Mae Chan Sub-district Administrative Organization covers the remaining area of the sub-district.
