= Chai Sathan, Saraphi =

Chai Sathan ไชยสถาน
- Tambon
- Country: Thailand
- Province: Chiang Mai
- District: Saraphi

Population (2005)
  - Total: 4,567
- Time zone: UTC+7 (ICT)

Chai Sathan (Thai: ไชยสถาน) is a tambon (subdistrict) of Saraphi District, in Chiang Mai Province, Thailand. In 2005, it had a population of 4,567 people. The tambon contains eight villages.
