= Mae Chan district =

District of Thailand

Mae Chan แม่จัน
- District
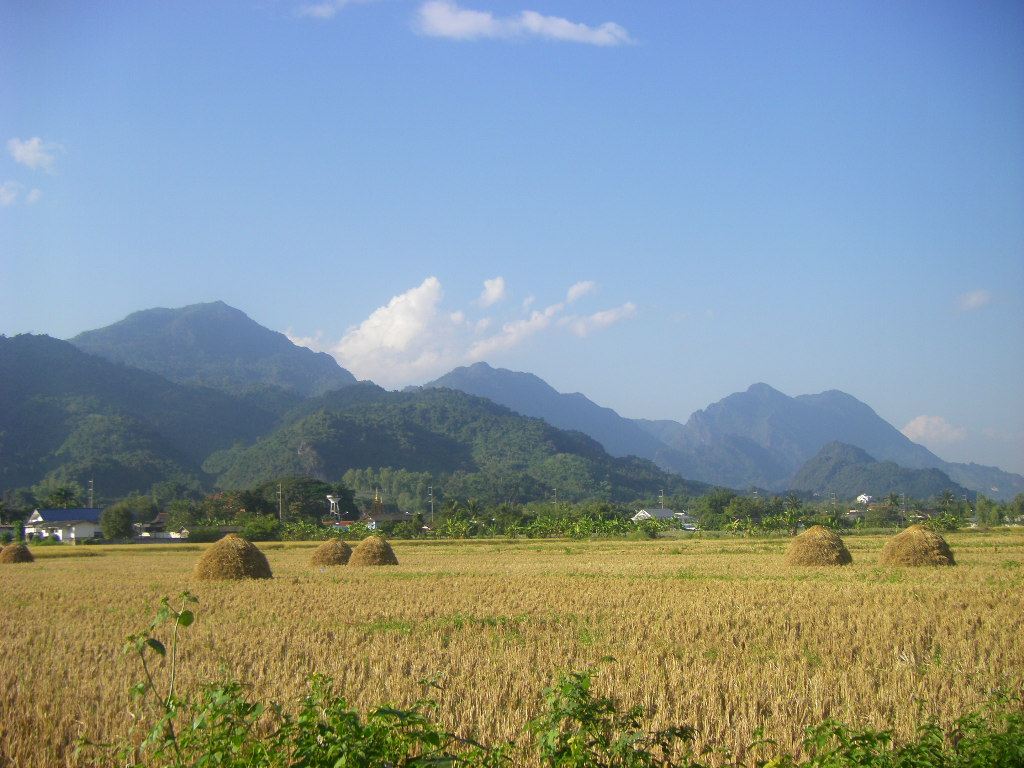
- Doi Nang Non, 'mountain of the sleeping lady'

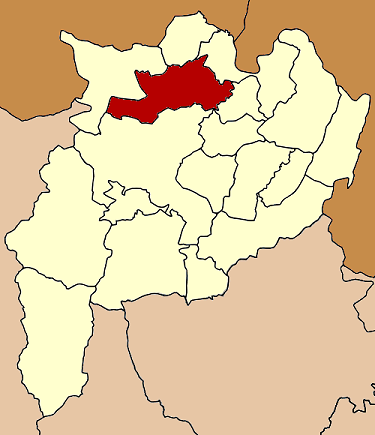
- District location in Chiang Rai province
- Coordinates: 20°8′48″N 99°51′12″E
- Country: Thailand
- Province: Chiang Rai
- Seat: Mae Chan
- Subdistricts: 8
- Muban: 139

Area
  - Total: 791.0 km^{2} (305.4 sq mi)

Population (2015)
  - Total: 108,182
  - Density: 129.7/km^{2} (336/sq mi)
- Time zone: UTC+7 (ICT)
- Postal code: 57110
- Geocode: 5707

Mae Chan (Thai: แม่จัน, pronounced [mɛ̂ː tɕān]; Northern Thai: ᩯᨾ᩵ᨩᩢ᩠ᨶ, pronounced [mɛ̂ː tɕǎn]) is a district (amphoe) in the northern part of Chiang Rai province, northern Thailand.

== Geography ==
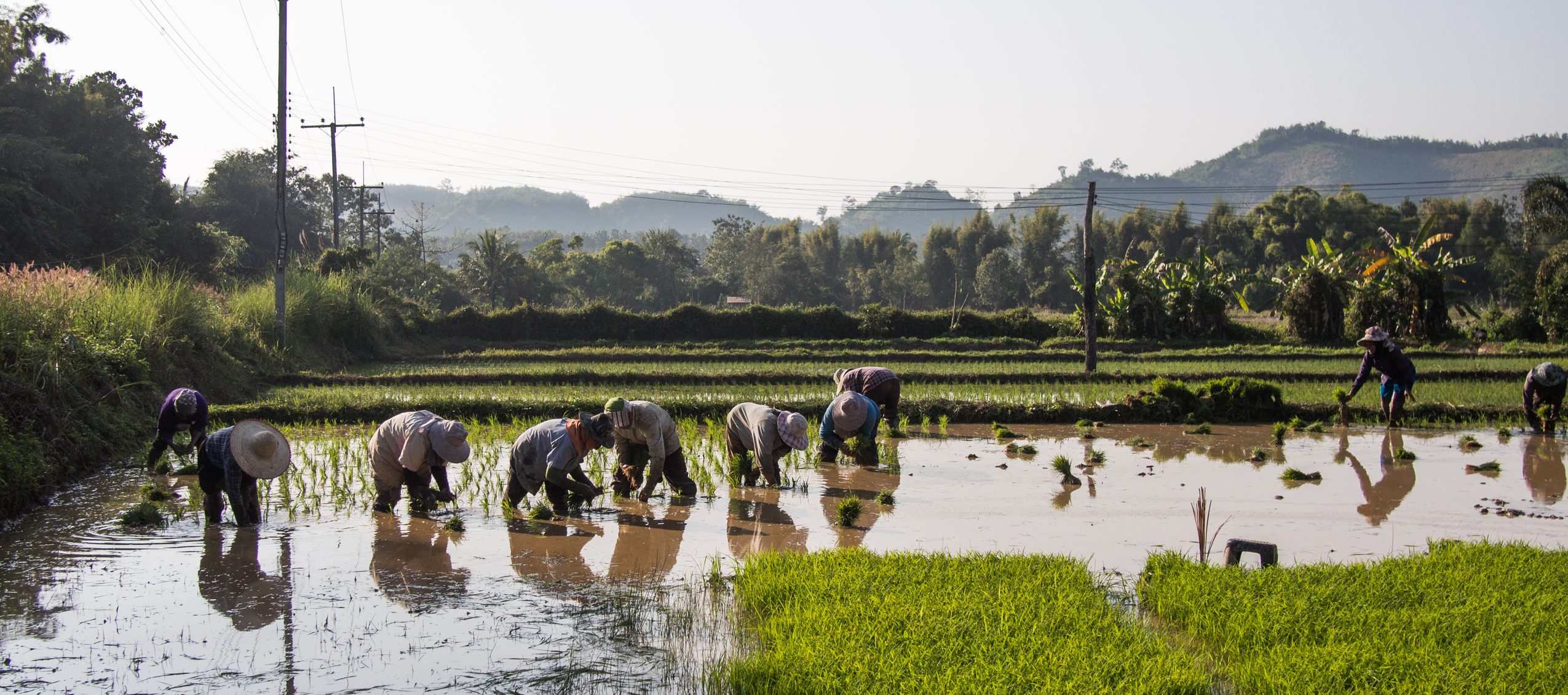
Rice planting, Mae Chan district

Neighboring districts are (from the north clockwise): Mae Sai, Chiang Saen, Doi Luang, Mueang Chiang Rai and Mae Fa Luang of Chiang Rai Province.

Doi Nang Non, the 'mountain of the sleeping lady', is part of the Daen Lao Range and is one of the main geographic features of Mae Chan District.

== History ==
The district was created as the successor of Mueang Chiang Saen. The original center of the mueang later became part of the minor district Chiang Saen Luang, so in 1939 this minor district was renamed to Chiang Saen, while the district Chiang Saen itself was renamed Mae Chan.

== Administration ==
=== Central administration ===
Mae Chan is divided into 11 subdistricts (tambons), which are further subdivided into 139 administrative villages (mubans).

No.	Name	Thai	Villages	Pop.
1.	Mae Chan	แม่จัน	14	11,084
2.	Chan Chwa	จันจว้า	11	7,151
3.	Mae Kham	แม่คำ	14	10,544
4.	Pa Sang	ป่าซาง	15	11,763
5.	San Sai	สันทราย	9	4,974
6.	Tha Khao Plueak	ท่าข้าวเปลือก	14	8,196
8.	Pa Tueng	ป่าตึง	20	26,197
10.	Mae Rai	แม่ไร่	9	10,213
11.	Si Kham	ศรีค้ำ	11	6,118
12.	Chan Chwa Tai	จันจว้าใต้	12	8,013
13.	Chom Sawan	จอมสวรรค์	10	3,930

Missing numbers are tambon which now form Doi Luang District.

=== Local administration ===
There are eight sub-district municipalities (thesaban tambons) in the district:

- Chan Chwa (Thai: เทศบาลตำบลจันจว้า) consisting of sub-districts Chan Chwa and Chan Chwa Tai.
- Mae Kham (Thai: เทศบาลตำบลแม่คำ) consisting of parts of sub-district Mae Kham.
- Mae Chan (Thai: เทศบาลตำบลแม่จัน) consisting of parts of sub-district Mae Chan.
- San Sai (Thai: เทศบาลตำบลสันทราย) consisting of parts of sub-district San Sai.
- Pa Sang (Thai: เทศบาลตำบลป่าซาง) consisting of sub-district Pa Sang.
- Sai Nam Kham (Thai: เทศบาลตำบลสายน้ำคำ) consisting of parts of sub-district Mae Kham.
- Tha Khao Plueak (Thai: เทศบาลตำบลท่าข้าวเปลือก) consisting of sub-district Tha Khao Plueak.
- Mae Rai (Thai: เทศบาลตำบลแม่ไร่) consisting of sub-district Mae Rai.

There are five sub-district administrative organizations (SAO) in the district:

- Mae Chan (Thai: องค์การบริหารส่วนตำบลแม่จัน) consisting of parts of sub-district Mae Chan.
- San Sai (Thai: องค์การบริหารส่วนตำบลสันทราย) consisting of parts of sub-district San Sai.
- Pa Tueng (Thai: องค์การบริหารส่วนตำบลป่าตึง) consisting of sub-district Pa Tueng.
- Si Kham (Thai: องค์การบริหารส่วนตำบลศรีค้ำ) consisting of sub-district Si Kham.
- Chom Sawan (Thai: องค์การบริหารส่วนตำบลจอมสวรรค์) consisting of sub-district Chom Sawan.
