= Chum Het =

Chum Het ชุมเห็ด
- Town
- Chum Het town เทศบาลเมืองชุมเห็ด
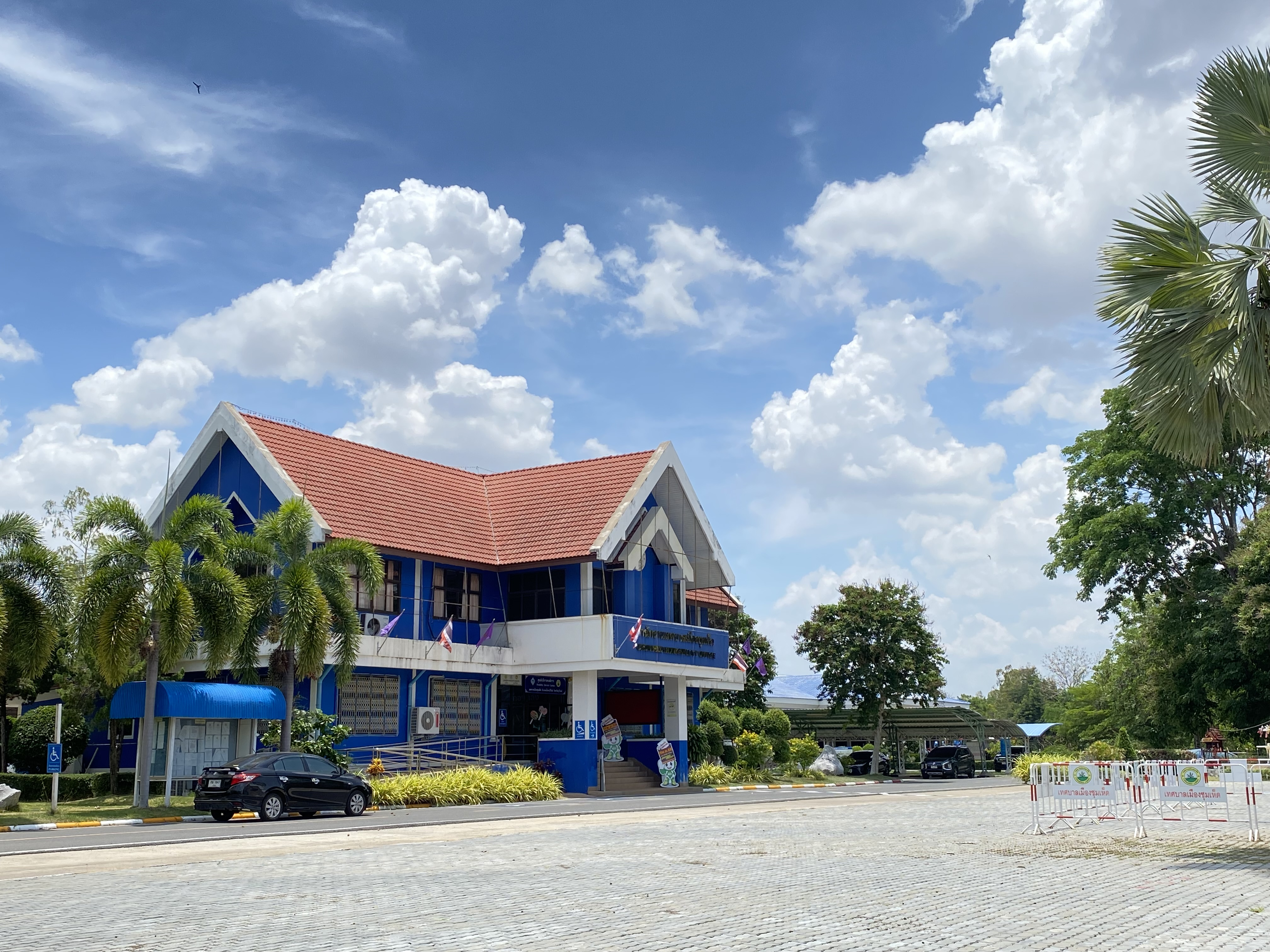
- Municipality office

- Location in Thailand
- Coordinates: 14°59′39″N 103°06′08″E
- Country: Thailand
- Province: Buriram
- District: Mueang Buriram
- Tambon: Tambon Chum Het
- Founded: ?
- Town municipality status: 2012

Government
  - Type: Local government
  - Mayor: Somsak Manthaisong

Area
  - Total: 18 sq mi (46 km^{2})
- Elevation: 535 ft (163 m)

Population (2012)
  - Total: 20,418
  - Metro density: 1,149.6/sq mi (443.86/km^{2})
- Time zone: UTC+7 (Thailand Standard Time)
- Postal code: 31000
- Area code: 044
- Website: http://chumhed.go.th/

Chum Het (Thai: ชุมเห็ด) is a town (thesaban mueang) in Thailand, about 413 km north-east of Bangkok. The town covers the whole tambon Chum Het of Mueang Buriram district. As of 2012, it has a population of 20,418.

== See also ==
- Buriram
- Buriram Province
- Amphoe Mueang Buriram
