= Mae Mo district =

Mae Mo แม่เมาะ
- District
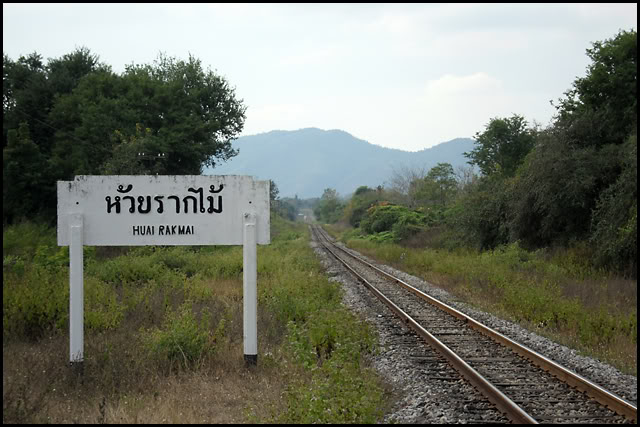
- Huai Rak Mai, a railway halt on Northern Railway Line, Mae Mo, Mae Mo District

- District location in Lampang province
- Coordinates: 18°16′30″N 99°39′0″E
- Country: Thailand
- Province: Lampang
- Seat: Mae Mo

Area
  - Total: 959.2 km^{2} (370.3 sq mi)

Population (2005)
  - Total: 38,768
  - Density: 40.4/km^{2} (105/sq mi)
- Time zone: UTC+7 (ICT)
- Postal code: 52220
- Geocode: 5202

Mae Mo (Thai: แม่เมาะ, pronounced [mɛ̂ː mɔ́ʔ]) or Mae Moh is a district (amphoe) in the eastern part of Lampang province, northern Thailand.

== Geography ==
Neighboring districts are (from the south clockwise): Mae Tha, Mueang Lampang, Chae Hom and Ngao of Lampang Province, Song and Long of Phrae province.

The Phi Pan Nam Mountains dominate the landscape of the district. Mae Mo is about 20 km (12 mi) from Mueang Lampang District.

== History ==
The minor district (king amphoe) was created on 15 April 1976, when three tambons, Ban Dong, Chang Nuea, and Na Sak, were split off from Mueang Lampang district. It was upgraded to a full district on 16 July 1984.

== Administration ==
The district is divided into five sub-districts (tambons), which are further subdivided into 37 villages (mubans). There are no municipal (thesabans). There are five tambon administrative organizations (TAO).

No.	Name	Thai name	Villages	Pop.
1.	Ban Dong	บ้านดง	8	4,677
2.	Na Sak	นาสัก	8	6,261
3.	Chang Nuea	จางเหนือ	6	5,336
4.	Mae Mo	แม่เมาะ	8	16,589
5.	Sop Pat	สบป้าด	7	5,905

== Economy ==
Mae Mo is the site of a 2,400 MW lignite-fueled power plant run by the Electricity Generating Authority of Thailand (EGAT), and the lignite mine that powers it. The plant has been the target of a series of lawsuits brought by locals who claim that the lignite mining operation and the burning of lignite fuel by EGAT has negatively impacted the environment and the health of those living in the vicinity. A 12-year fight by villagers for compensation for damages ended in victory for the plaintiffs in February 2015. The Supreme Administrative Court in Chiang Mai Province upheld a ruling by the Chiang Mai Administrative Court in 2005. The court handed down a verdict ordering EGAT to pay compensation to 131 plaintiffs, some of them deceased. Plant victims were awarded between 20,000 and 240,000 baht each, commensurate with their suffering. The total amounts to 25 million baht plus 7.5 percent interest.

Several days earlier, the court had ordered EGAT to return its Mae Mo golf course, adjacent to the open pit lignite mine, to woodland in order to help clean up the air pollution caused by EGAT's Mae Mo operations.

Coal-fired power plants such as Mae Mo can release up to 150 million tonnes of CO_{2} over their design life of 20–25 years, according to Greenpeace-Thailand.

Excavations at the open-pit lignite mine revealed what is thought to be the world's largest freshwater snail terrace. The terrace, 12 metres deep and covering 43 rai (6.9 ha; 17 acres), is up to 13 million years old. Attempts by organizations to preserve the site were dashed in September 2018 when the Supreme Administrative Court overturned a lower court ruling protecting the site. EGAT claimed that the cost of preservation would amount to 132.5 billion baht in lost revenue.

EGAT began the decommissioning of the Mae Moh lignite mine, the largest coal mine in Thailand, in 2019.
