= Pa Sang, Mae Chan =

Pa Sang ป่าซาง
- Tambon
- Interactive map of Pa Sang
- Coordinates: 20°10′57″N 99°49′56″E
- Country: Thailand
- Province: Chiang Rai
- Amphoe: Mae Chan

Population (2020)
  - Total: 11,601
- Time zone: UTC+7 (TST)
- Postal code: 57110
- TIS 1099: 570704

Pa Sang (Thai: ป่าซาง) is a tambon (subdistrict) of Mae Chan District, in Chiang Rai Province, Thailand. In 2020 it had a total population of 11,601 people.

== Administration ==
=== Central administration ===
The tambon is subdivided into 15 administrative villages (muban).

No.	Name	Thai
1.	Ban Rong Di	บ้านร่องดี
2.	Ban Pa Sang	บ้านป่าซาง
3.	Ban Pa Sang	บ้านป่าซาง
4.	Ban Mae Salong Nai	บ้านแม่สลองใน
5.	Ban Pang Pu Loei	บ้านปางปูเลย
6.	Ban Pa Ha	บ้านป่าห้า
7.	Ban Mae Khi	บ้านแม่คี
8.	Ban Si Yang Mun	บ้านศรียางมูล
9.	Ban Mae Khi	บ้านแม่คี
10.	Ban Mai Phatthana	บ้านใหม่พัฒนา
11.	Ban Nong O	บ้านหนองอ้อ
12.	Ban San Khue	บ้านสันคือ
13.	Ban Pa Khu	บ้านป่าคู
14.	Ban Mae Salong	บ้านแม่สลอง
15.	Ban Pa Miang	บ้านป่าเมี้ยง

=== Local administration ===
The whole area of the subdistrict is covered by the subdistrict municipality (Thesaban Tambon) Pa Sang (เทศบาลตำบลป่าซาง).
