= Saraphi district =

Saraphi สารภี
- District
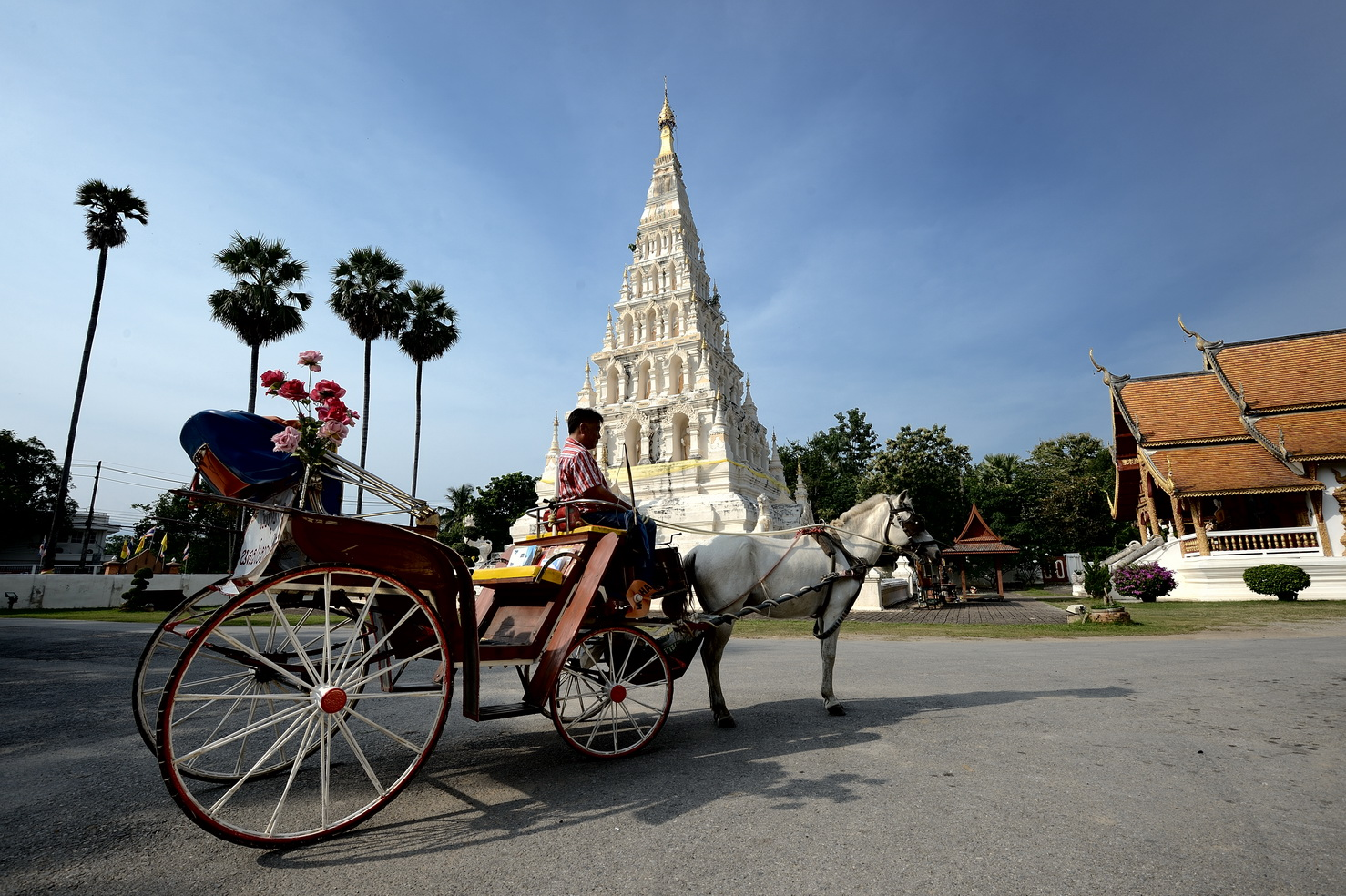
- Wat Chedi Liam, a part of greater Wiang Kum Kam archaeology site

- District location in Chiang Mai province
- Coordinates: 18°42′48″N 99°2′11″E
- Country: Thailand
- Province: Chiang Mai

Area
  - Total: 97.45 km^{2} (37.63 sq mi)

Population (2005)
  - Total: 74,782
  - Density: 767.4/km^{2} (1,988/sq mi)
- Time zone: UTC+7 (ICT)
- Postal code: 50140
- Geocode: 5019

Saraphi (Thai: สารภี) is a district (amphoe) of Chiang Mai province, northern Thailand.

== Etymology ==
Saraphi is the Thai name for a tree, Mammea siamensis.

== Geography ==
Saraphi borders the districts (from west clockwise) Hang Dong, Mueang Chiang Mai, San Kamphaeng of Chiang Mai Province, Mueang Lamphun of Lamphun province.

== History ==
The district was established in 1891, then named Yang Noeng (ยางเนิ้ง). In 1927 it was renamed Saraphi.

== Tourism ==
Wiang Kum Kam is at the site of an old city in the Tha Wang Tan sub-district. King Mangrai lived there for ten years before the founding of Chiang Mai. The site includes many ruined temples which are often visited by visitors of Chiang Mai.

== Administration ==
The district is divided into 12 sub-districts (tambons), which are further subdivided into 105 villages (mubans). Yang Noeng is a township (thesaban tambon) which covers parts of tambons Yang Noeng, Saraphi, and Nong Phueng. The township Saraphi covers parts of tambon Saraphi. There are a further 10 tambon administrative organizations (TAO).

No.	Name	Thai name	Villages	Pop.
1.	Yang Noeng	ยางเนิ้ง	7	8,964
2.	Saraphi	สารภี	9	6,959
3.	Chom Phu	ชมภู	9	6,873
4.	Chai Sathan	ไชยสถาน	8	4,567
5.	Khua Mung	ขัวมุง	10	5,510
6.	Nong Faek	หนองแฝก	9	5,271
7.	Nong Phueng	หนองผึ้ง	8	11,429
8.	Tha Kwang	ท่ากว้าง	7	2,856
9.	Don Kaeo	ดอนแก้ว	7	3,913
10.	Tha Wang Tan	ท่าวังตาล	13	9,299
11.	San Sai	สันทราย	12	5,635
12.	Pa Bong	ป่าบง	6	3,506

== See also ==
- Chiang Mai Metropolitan Area
