= List of tambon in Thailand (A) =

This is a list of tambon (sub-districts) in Thailand, beginning with the letter A. This information is liable to change due to border changes or re-allocation of tambons.

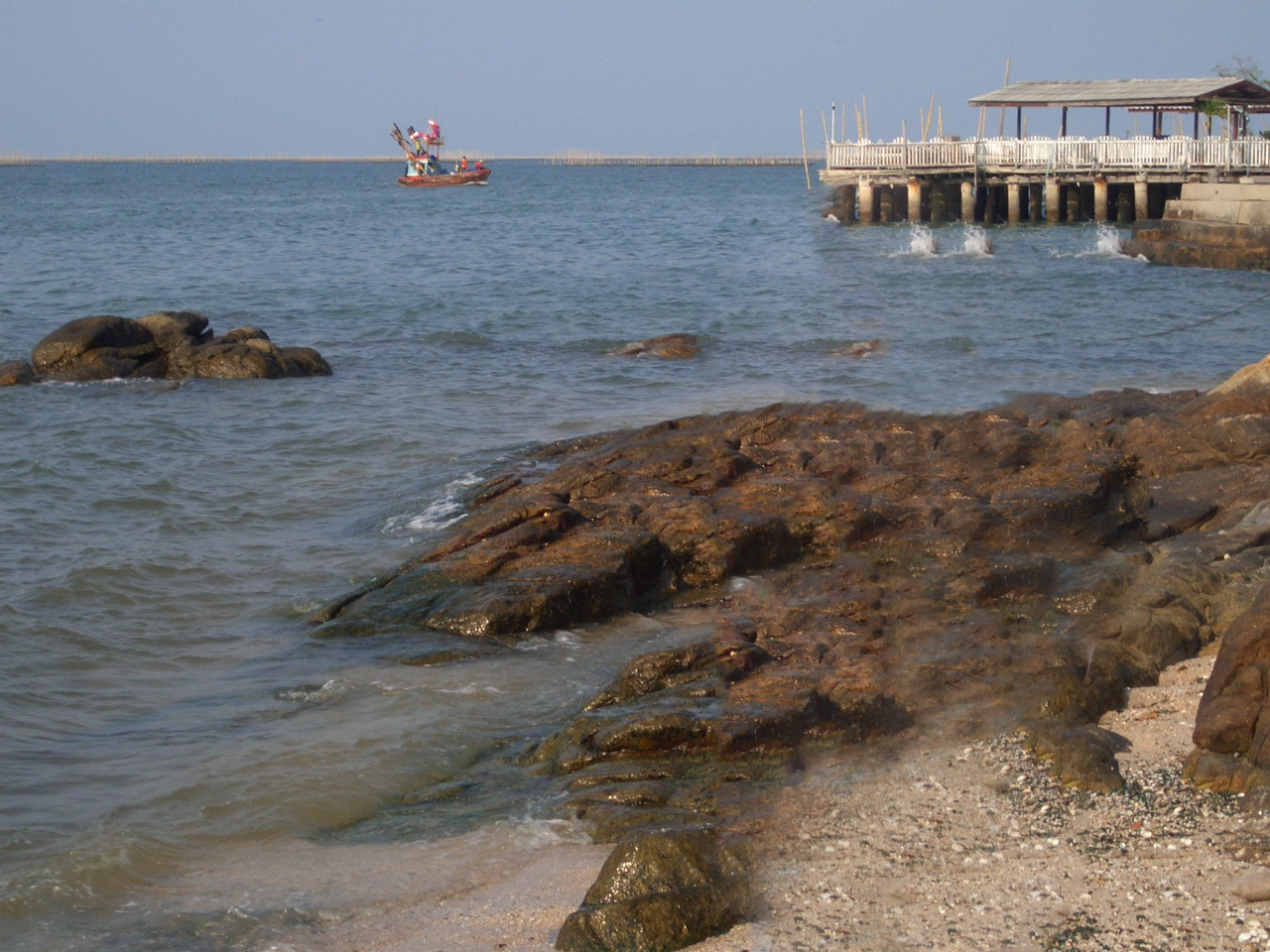
Ang Sila, Mueang Chonburi District Chonburi Province

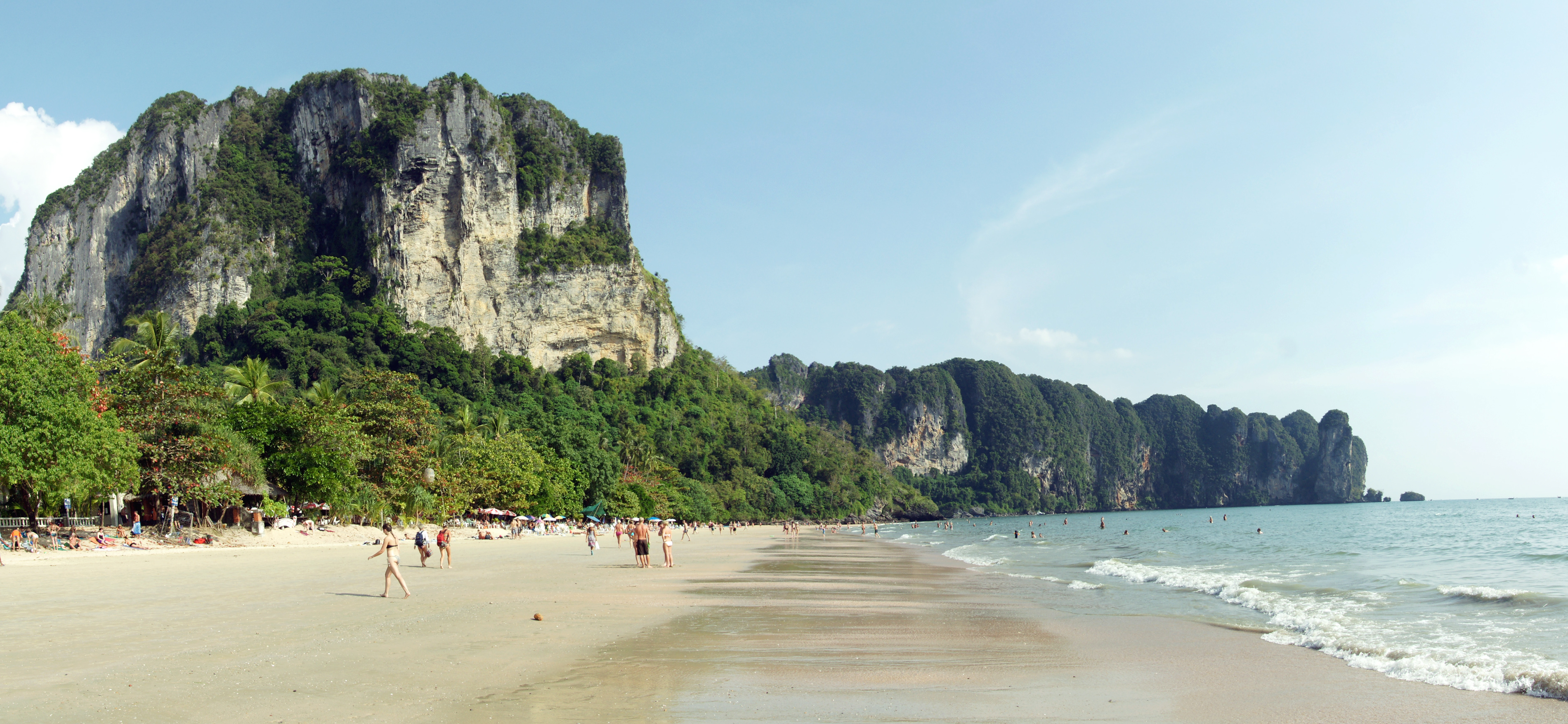
Ao Nang, Mueang Krabi District, Krabi Province

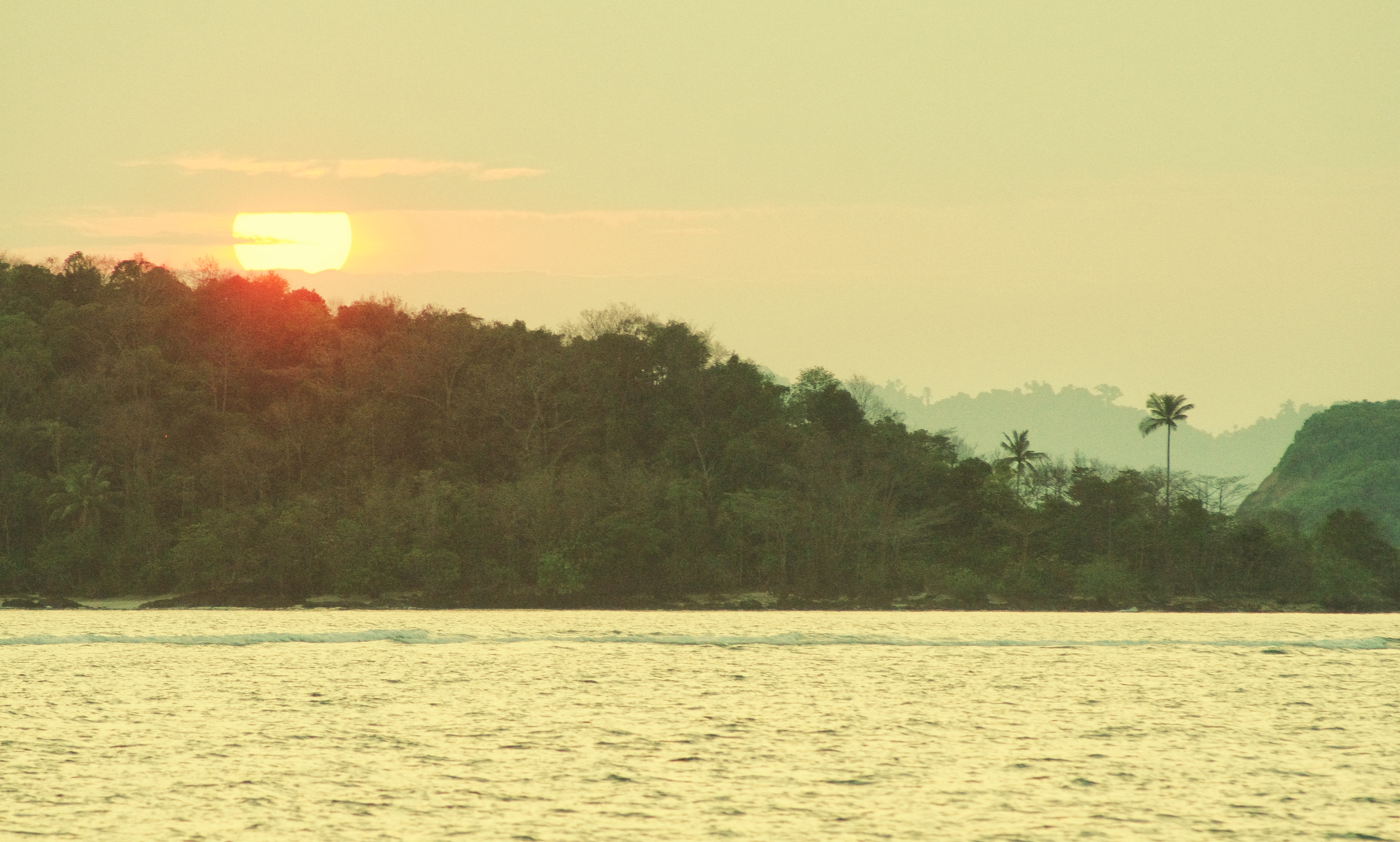
Ao Yai, Mueang Trat District, Trat Province

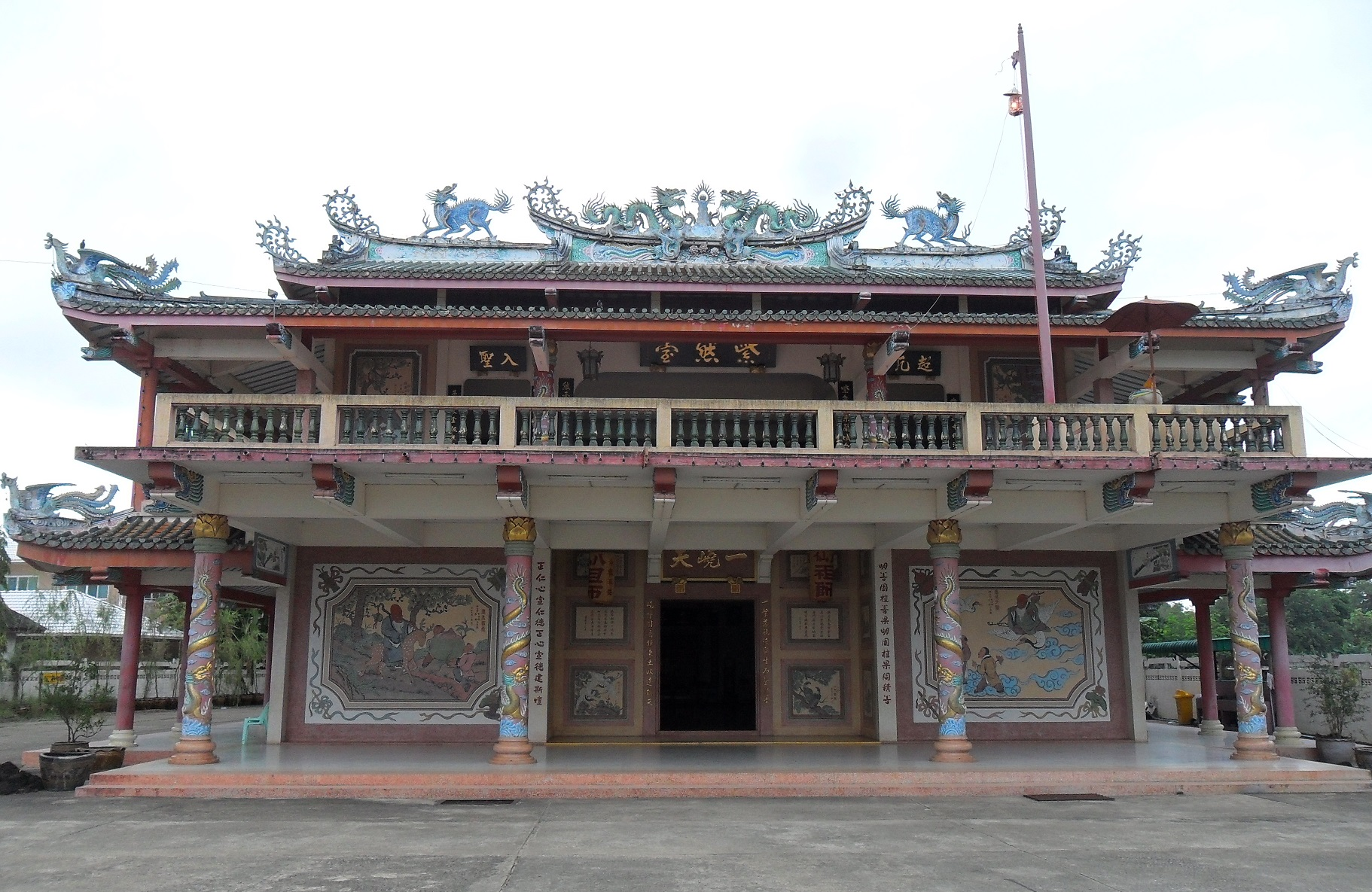
Aranyaprathet, Aranyaprathet District Sa Kaeo Province

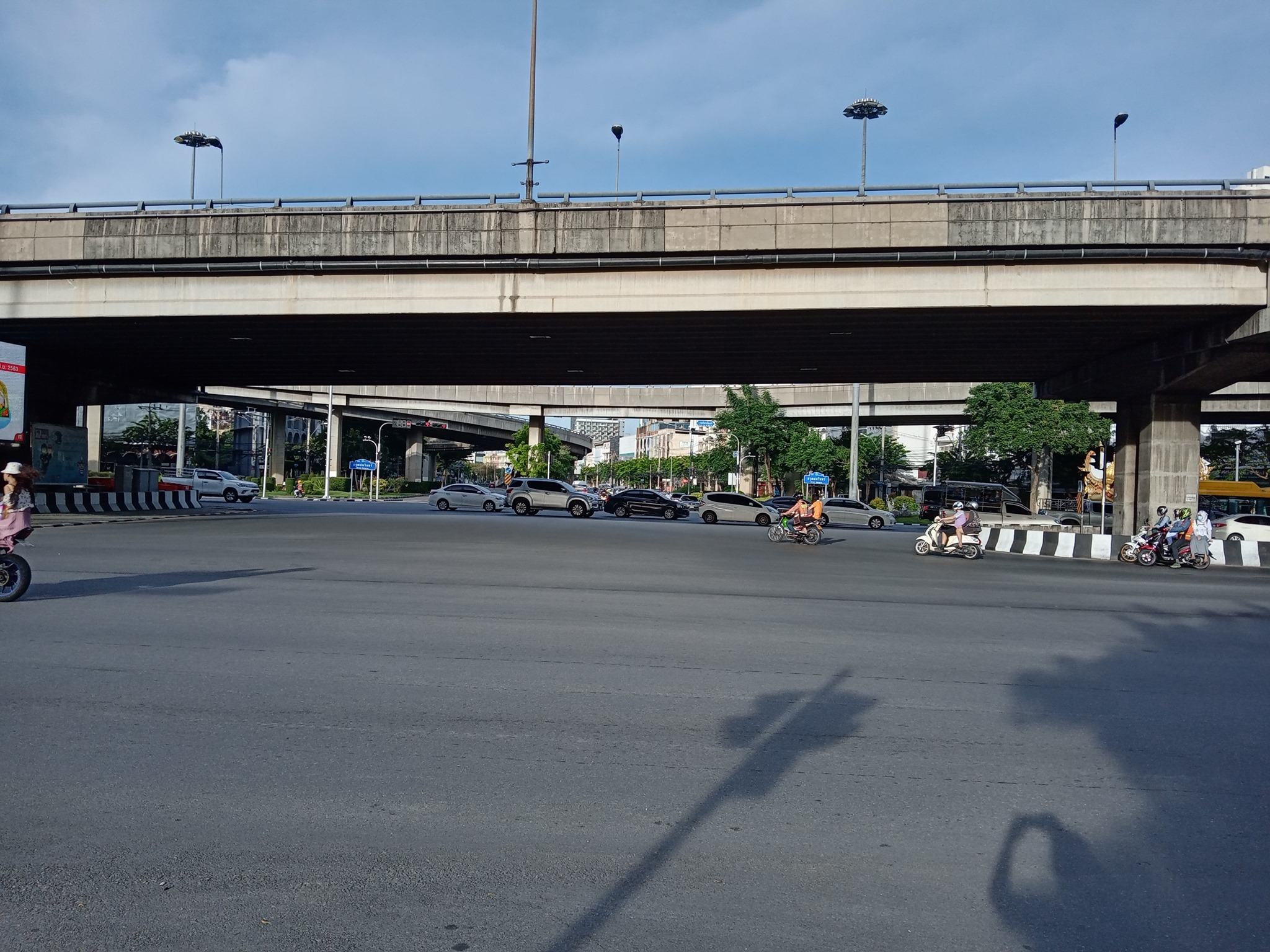
Arun Ammarin, Bangkok Noi, Bangkok

Tambon	ตำบล	Amphoe (District)	อำเภอ	Changwat (Province)	จังหวัด	Region
A Hi	อาฮี	Tha Li District	ท่าลี่	Loei	เลย	Northeast
A Phon	อาโพน	Buachet District	บัวเชด	Surin	สุรินทร์	Northeast
Asong Subdistrict	อาซ่อง	Raman District (Malay: Reman)	รามัน	Yala	ยะลา	South
Ai Na Lai	อ่ายนาไลย	Wiang Sa	เวียงสา	Nan	น่าน	North
Aiyoe Weng	อัยเยอร์เวง	Betong District (Malay: Betung)	เบตง	Yala	ยะลา	South
Akat	อากาศ	Akat Amnuai District	อากาศอำนวย	Sakon Nakhon	สกลนคร	Northeast
Akkha Kham	อัคคะคำ	Pho Chai District	โพธิ์ชัย	Roi Et	ร้อยเอ็ด	Northeast
Ammarit	อมฤต	Phak Hai District	ผักไห่	Phra Nakhon Si Ayutthaya	พระนครศรีอยุธยา	Central
Amnat	อำนาจ	Lue Amnat District	ลืออำนาจ	Amnat Charoen	อำนาจเจริญ	Northeast
Amphaeng	อำแพง	Ban Phaeo District	บ้านแพ้ว	Samut Sakhon	สมุทรสาคร	Central
Amphawa	อัมพวา	Amphawa District	อัมพวา	Samut Songkhram	สมุทรสงคราม	Central
Ang Hin	อ่างหิน	Pak Tho District	ปากท่อ	Ratchaburi	ราชบุรี	West
Ang Kaeo	อ่างแก้ว	Pho Thong District	โพธิ์ทอง	Ang Thong	อ่างทอง	Central
Ang Khiri	อ่างคีรี	Makham District	มะขาม	Chanthaburi	จันทบุรี	East
Ang Sila	อ่างศิลา	Phibun Mangsahan District	พิบูลมังสาหาร	Ubon Ratchathani	อุบลราชธานี	Northeast
Ang Sila	อ่างศิลา	Mueang Chonburi District	เมืองชลบุรี	Chonburi	ชลบุรี	East
Ang Thong	อ่างทอง	Srinagarindra District	ศรีนครินทร์	Phatthalung	พัทลุง	South
Ang Thong	อ่างทอง	Ko Samui District	เกาะสมุย	Surat Thani	สุราษฎร์ธานี	South
Ang Thong	อ่างทอง	Mueang Kamphaeng Phet District	เมืองกำแพงเพชร	Kamphaeng Phet	กำแพงเพชร	Central
Ang Thong	อ่างทอง	Chiang Kham District	เชียงคำ	Phayao	พะเยา	North
Ang Thong	อ่างทอง	Thap Sakae District	ทับสะแก	Prachuap Khiri Khan	ประจวบคีรีขันธ์	West
Ang Thong	อ่างทอง	Banphot Phisai District	บรรพตพิสัย	Nakhon Sawan	นครสวรรค์	Central
Ang Thong	อ่างทอง	Mueang Ratchaburi District	เมืองราชบุรี	Ratchaburi	ราชบุรี	West
Anoru	อาเนาะรู	Mueang Pattani District (Malay: Patani)	เมืองปัตตานี	Pattani	ปัตตานี	South
Anusawari	อนุสาวรีย์	Khet Bang Khen	บางเขน	Bangkok	กรุงเทพมหานคร	Central
Ao Luek Noi	อ่าวลึกน้อย	Ao Luek District	อ่าวลึก	Krabi	กระบี่	South
Ao Luek Nuea	อ่าวลึกเหนือ	Ao Luek District	อ่าวลึก	Krabi	กระบี่	South
Ao Luek Tai	อ่าวลึกใต้	Ao Luek District	อ่าวลึก	Krabi	กระบี่	South
Ao Nang	อ่าวนาง	Mueang Krabi District	เมืองกระบี่	Krabi	กระบี่	South
Ao Noi	อ่าวน้อย	Mueang Prachuap Khiri Khan District	เมืองประจวบคีรีขันธ์	Prachuap Khiri Khan	ประจวบคีรีขันธ์	West
Ao Tong	อ่าวตง	Wang Wiset District	วังวิเศษ	Trang	ตรัง	South
Ao Yai	อ่าวใหญ่	Mueang Trat District	เมืองตราด	Trat	ตราด	East
Aranyakham Wari	อรัญคามวารี	Khian Sa District	เคียนซา	Surat Thani	สุราษฎร์ธานี	South
Aranyaprathet	อรัญประเทศ	Aranyaprathet District	อรัญประเทศ	Sa Kaeo	สระแก้ว	East
Aranyik	อรัญญิก	Mueang Phitsanulok District	เมืองพิษณุโลก	Phitsanulok	พิษณุโลก	Central
Arun Ammarin	อรุณอมรินทร์	Khet Bangkok Noi	บางกอกน้อย	Bangkok	กรุงเทพมหานคร	Central
Asa	อาษา	Ban Na District	บ้านนา	Nakhon Nayok	นครนายก	Central
At Samat	อาจสามารถ	At Samat District	อาจสามารถ	Roi Et	ร้อยเอ็ด	Northeast
At Samat	อาจสามารถ	Mueang Nakhon Phanom District	เมืองนครพนม	Nakhon Phanom	นครพนม	Northeast

== See also ==
- Organization of the government of Thailand
- List of districts of Thailand
- List of districts of Bangkok
- List of tambon in Thailand
- Provinces of Thailand
- List of municipalities in Thailand
