= List of tambon in Thailand (Y) =

This is a list of tambon (sub-districts) in Thailand, beginning with the letter Y. This information is liable to change due to border changes or re-allocation of Tambons.

| Tambon | ตำบล | Amphoe | อำเภอ | Changwat (Province) | จังหวัด | Region |
|---|---|---|---|---|---|---|
| Ya Plong | หญ้าปล้อง | Mueang Sisaket | เมืองศรีสะเกษ | Sisaket | ศรีสะเกษ | North-East |
| Yabi | ยาบี | Nong Chik | หนองจิก | Pattani | ปัตตานี | South |
| Yaha | ยะหา | Yaha | ยะหา | Yala | ยะลา | South |
| Yai Cha | ยายชา | Sam Phran | สามพราน | Nakhon Pathom | นครปฐม | Central |
| Yai Phaeng | ยายแพง | Bang Khonthi | บางคนที | Samut Songkhram | สมุทรสงคราม | Central |
| Yai Ra | ยายร้า | Tha Mai | ท่าใหม่ | Chanthaburi | จันทบุรี | East |
| Yai Yaem Watthana | ยายแย้มวัฒนา | Chaloem Phra Kiat | เฉลิมพระเกียรติ | Buriram | บุรีรัมย์ | North-East |
| Yala | ยะลา | Mueang Yala | เมืองยะลา | Yala | ยะลา | South |
| Yamu | ยามู | Yaring (Malay: Jamu) | ยะหริ่ง | Pattani | ปัตตานี | South |
| Yan Matsi | ย่านมัทรี | Phayuha Khiri | พยุหะคีรี | Nakhon Sawan | นครสวรรค์ | Central |
| Yan Nawa | ยานนาวา | Khet Sathon | สาทร | Bangkok | กรุงเทพมหานคร | Central |
| Yan Ri | ย่านรี | Sam Ngao | สามเงา | Tak | ตาก | West |
| Yan Ri | ย่านรี | Kabin Buri | กบินทร์บุรี | Prachin Buri | ปราจีนบุรี | East |
| Yan Sue | ย่านซื่อ | Mueang Ang Thong | เมืองอ่างทอง | Ang Thong | อ่างทอง | Central |
| Yan Sue | ย่านซื่อ | Khuan Don (Malay: Dusun) | ควนโดน | Satun | สตูล | South |
| Yan Sue | ย่านซื่อ | Kantang | กันตัง | Trang | ตรัง | South |
| Yan Ta Khao | ย่านตาขาว | Yan Ta Khao | ย่านตาขาว | Trang | ตรัง | South |
| Yan Yao | ย่านยาว | Sam Chuk | สามชุก | Suphan Buri | สุพรรณบุรี | Central |
| Yan Yao | ย่านยาว | Mueang Phichit | เมืองพิจิตร | Phichit | พิจิตร | Central |
| Yan Yao | ย่านยาว | Sawankhalok | สวรรคโลก | Sukhothai | สุโขทัย | Central |
| Yan Yao | ย่านยาว | Khiri Rat Nikhom | คีรีรัฐนิคม | Surat Thani | สุราษฎร์ธานี | South |
| Yang | ยาง | Sikhoraphum | ศีขรภูมิ | Surin | สุรินทร์ | North-East |
| Yang | ยาง | Borabue | บรบือ | Maha Sarakham | มหาสารคาม | North-East |
| Yang | ยาง | Nam Yuen | น้ำยืน | Ubon Ratchathani | อุบลราชธานี | North-East |
| Yang | ยาง | Kanthararom | กันทรารมย์ | Sisaket | ศรีสะเกษ | North-East |
| Yang Chai | ยางช้าย | Pho Thong | โพธิ์ทอง | Ang Thong | อ่างทอง | Central |
| Yang Chum Noi | ยางชุมน้อย | Yang Chum Noi | ยางชุมน้อย | Sisaket | ศรีสะเกษ | North-East |
| Yang Chum Yai | ยางชุมใหญ่ | Yang Chum Noi | ยางชุมน้อย | Sisaket | ศรีสะเกษ | North-East |
| Yang Hak | ยางหัก | Pak Tho | ปากท่อ | Ratchaburi | ราชบุรี | West |
| Yang Hom | ยางฮอม | Khun Tan | ขุนตาล | Chiang Rai | เชียงราย | North |
| Yang Kham | ยางคำ | Phon Sai | โพนทราย | Roi Et | ร้อยเอ็ด | North-East |
| Yang Kham | ยางคำ | Nong Ruea | หนองเรือ | Khon Kaen | ขอนแก่น | North-East |
| Yang Khao | ยางขาว | Phayuha Khiri | พยุหะคีรี | Nakhon Sawan | นครสวรรค์ | Central |
| Yang Khi Nok | ยางขี้นก | Khueang Nai | เขื่องใน | Ubon Ratchathani | อุบลราชธานี | North-East |
| Yang Khom | ยางค้อม | Phipun | พิปูน | Nakhon Si Thammarat | นครศรีธรรมราช | South |
| Yang Khram | ยางคราม | Doi Lo | ดอยหล่อ | Chiang Mai | เชียงใหม่ | North |
| Yang Klon | ยางโกลน | Nakhon Thai | นครไทย | Phitsanulok | พิษณุโลก | Central |
| Yang Lo | ยางหล่อ | Si Bun Rueang | ศรีบุญเรือง | Nong Bua Lamphu | หนองบัวลำภู | North-East |
| Yang Moen | ยั้งเมิน | Samoeng | สะเมิง | Chiang Mai | เชียงใหม่ | North |
| Yang Muang | ยางม่วง | Tha Maka | ท่ามะกา | Kanchanaburi | กาญจนบุรี | West |
| Yang Nam Klat Nuea | ยางน้ำกลัดเหนือ | Nong Ya Plong | หนองหญ้าปล้อง | Phetchaburi | เพชรบุรี | West |
| Yang Nam Klat Tai | ยางน้ำกลัดใต้ | Nong Ya Plong | หนองหญ้าปล้อง | Phetchaburi | เพชรบุรี | West |
| Yang Ngam | ยางงาม | Nong Phai | หนองไผ่ | Phetchabun | เพชรบูรณ์ | Central |
| Yang Noeng | ยางเนิ้ง | Saraphi | สารภี | Chiang Mai | เชียงใหม่ | North |
| Yang Noi | ยางน้อย | Kosum Phisai | โกสุมพิสัย | Maha Sarakham | มหาสารคาม | North-East |
| Yang Non | ยางนอน | Doem Bang Nang Buat | เดิมบางนางบวช | Suphan Buri | สุพรรณบุรี | Central |
| Yang Piang | ยางเปียง | Omkoi | อมก๋อย | Chiang Mai | เชียงใหม่ | North |
| Yang Rak | ยางราก | Khok Charoen | โคกเจริญ | Lopburi | ลพบุรี | Central |
| Yang Sai | ยางซ้าย | Mueang Sukhothai | เมืองสุโขทัย | Sukhothai | สุโขทัย | Central |
| Yang Sao | ยางสาว | Wichian Buri | วิเชียรบุรี | Phetchabun | เพชรบูรณ์ | Central |
| Yang Sawang | ยางสว่าง | Rattanaburi | รัตนบุรี | Surin | สุรินทร์ | North-East |
| Yang Sisurat | ยางสีสุราช | Yang Sisurat | ยางสีสุราช | Maha Sarakham | มหาสารคาม | North-East |
| Yang Sung | ยางสูง | Khanu Woralaksaburi | ขาณุวรลักษบุรี | Kamphaeng Phet | กำแพงเพชร | Central |
| Yang Talat | ยางตลาด | Yang Talat | ยางตลาด | Kalasin | กาฬสินธุ์ | North-East |
| Yang Tan | ยางตาล | Krok Phra | โกรกพระ | Nakhon Sawan | นครสวรรค์ | Central |
| Yang Tha Chaeng | ยางท่าแจ้ง | Kosum Phisai | โกสุมพิสัย | Maha Sarakham | มหาสารคาม | North-East |
| Yang Thon | ยางโทน | Nong Muang | หนองม่วง | Lopburi | ลพบุรี | Central |
| Yang Um | ยางอู้ม | Tha Khantho | ท่าคันโท | Kalasin | กาฬสินธุ์ | North-East |
| Yang Wai | ยางหวาย | Khon Sawan | คอนสวรรค์ | Chaiyaphum | ชัยภูมิ | North-East |
| Yang Yai | ยางใหญ่ | Changhan | จังหาร | Roi Et | ร้อยเอ็ด | North-East |
| Yang Yai | ยางใหญ่ | Nam Yuen | น้ำยืน | Ubon Ratchathani | อุบลราชธานี | North-East |
| Yang Yo Phap | ยางโยภาพ | Muang Sam Sip | ม่วงสามสิบ | Ubon Ratchathani | อุบลราชธานี | North-East |
| Yang Yong | ยางหย่อง | Tha Yang | ท่ายาง | Phetchaburi | เพชรบุรี | West |
| Yap Hua Na | ยาบหัวนา | Wiang Sa | เวียงสา | Nan | น่าน | North |
| Yarang | ยะรัง | Yarang | ยะรัง | Pattani | ปัตตานี | South |
| Yarom | ยะรม | Betong (Malay: Betung) | เบตง | Yala | ยะลา | South |
| Yata | ยะต๊ะ | Raman (Malay: Reman) | รามัน | Yala | ยะลา | South |
| Yawuek | ยะวึก | Chumphon Buri | ชุมพลบุรี | Surin | สุรินทร์ | North-East |
| Yi Lon | ยี่ล้น | Wiset Chai Chan | วิเศษชัยชาญ | Ang Thong | อ่างทอง | Central |
| Yi-ngo | ยี่งอ | Yi-ngo (Malay: Jeringo) | ยี่งอ | Narathiwat | นราธิวาส | South |
| Yisan | ยี่สาร | Amphawa | อัมพวา | Samut Songkhram | สมุทรสงคราม | Central |
| Yoei Prasat | เย้ยปราสาท | Nong Ki | หนองกี่ | Buriram | บุรีรัมย์ | North-East |
| Yokkrabat | ยกกระบัตร | Ban Phaeo | บ้านแพ้ว | Samut Sakhon | สมุทรสาคร | Central |
| Yokkrabat | ยกกระบัตร | Sam Ngao | สามเงา | Tak | ตาก | West |
| Yom | ยม | Tha Wang Pha | ท่าวังผา | Nan | น่าน | North |
| Yonok | โยนก | Chiang Saen | เชียงแสน | Chiang Rai | เชียงราย | North |
| Yot | ยอด | Song Khwae | สองแคว | Nan | น่าน | North |
| Yot Chat | ยอดชาด | Wang Yang | วังยาง | Nakhon Phanom | นครพนม | North-East |
| Yot Kaeng | ยอดแกง | Na Mon | นามน | Kalasin | กาฬสินธุ์ | North-East |
| Yothaka | โยธะกา | Bang Nam Priao | บางน้ำเปรี้ยว | Chachoengsao | ฉะเชิงเทรา | East |
| Yu Wa | ยุหว่า | San Pa Tong | สันป่าตอง | Chiang Mai | เชียงใหม่ | North |
| Yuan | หย่วน | Chiang Kham | เชียงคำ | Phayao | พะเยา | North |
| Yung Thalai | ยุ้งทะลาย | U Thong | อู่ทอง | Suphan Buri | สุพรรณบุรี | Central |
| Yupo | ยุโป | Mueang Yala | เมืองยะลา | Yala | ยะลา | South |

== See also ==
- Organization of the government of Thailand
- List of districts of Thailand
- List of districts of Bangkok
- List of tambon in Thailand
- Provinces of Thailand
- List of municipalities in Thailand
