= Ang Thong (disambiguation) =

Ang Thong (Thai: อ่างทอง, lit. 'Bowl of Gold') may refer to:

== Places ==
- Ang Thong Province
- Mueang Ang Thong District
- Ang Thong town
- Mu Ko Ang Thong National Park, a group of islands and national park in Surat Thani Province
- Ang Thong Subdistrict, Prachuap Khiri Khan province
- Ang Thong Subdistrict, Phayao province
- Ang Thong Subdistrict, Nakhon Sawan province
- Ang Thong Subdistrict, Kamphaeng Phet province
- Ang Thong subdistrict, Ratchaburi province
- Ang Thong subdistrict, Surat Thani province
- Ang Thong subdistrict, Phatthalung province

== Ships ==
- HTMS Angthong (I), the former Royal Yacht Maha Chakri (II), a support ship of the royal Thai Navy in service from 1935 to 1945
- HTMS Angthong (711), an LST-542-class tank landing ship of the Royal Thai Navy, in service from 1947 to 2006
- HTMS Angthong (791), an Endurance-class landing platform dock ship of the Royal Thai Navy, commissioned in 2012

== Others ==
- Angthong F.C., a football club based in Ang Thong
