= List of tambon in Thailand (U–V) =

This is a list of tambon (sub-districts) in Thailand, beginning with the letters U and V. This information is liable to change due to border changes or re-allocation of Tambons.

Tambon	ตำบล	Amphoe	อำเภอ	Changwat (Province)	จังหวัด	Region
U Lok	อู่โลก	Lamduan	ลำดวน	Surin	สุรินทร์	North-East
U Taphao	อู่ตะเภา	Manorom	มโนรมย์	Chai Nat	ชัยนาท	Central
U Thong	อู่ทอง	U Thong	อู่ทอง	Suphan Buri	สุพรรณบุรี	Central
Uan	อวน	Pua	ปัว	Nan	น่าน	North
Udai Charoen	อุใดเจริญ	Khuan Kalong	ควนกาหลง	Satun	สตูล	South
Udom Phon	อุดมพร	Fao Rai	เฝ้าไร่	Nong Khai	หนองคาย	North-East
Udom Sap	อุดมทรัพย์	Wang Nam Khiao	วังน้ำเขียว	Nakhon Ratchasima	นครราชสีมา	North-East
Udom Thanya	อุดมธัญญา	Tak Fa	ตากฟ้า	Nakhon Sawan	นครสวรรค์	Central
Ueat Yai	เอือดใหญ่	Si Mueang Mai	ศรีเมืองใหม่	Ubon Ratchathani	อุบลราชธานี	North-East
Ulok Si Muen	อุโลกสี่หมื่น	Tha Maka	ท่ามะกา	Kanchanaburi	กาญจนบุรี	West
Um Chan	อุ่มจาน	Prachaksinlapakhom	ประจักษ์ศิลปาคม	Udon Thani	อุดรธานี	North-East
Um Chan	อุ่มจาน	Kusuman	กุสุมาลย์	Sakon Nakhon	สกลนคร	North-East
Um Mao	อุ่มเม่า	Yang Talat	ยางตลาด	Kalasin	กาฬสินธุ์	North-East
Um Mao	อุ่มเม้า	Thawat Buri	ธวัชบุรี	Roi Et	ร้อยเอ็ด	North-East
Um Mao	อุ่มเม่า	Phon Thong	โพนทอง	Roi Et	ร้อยเอ็ด	North-East
Um Mao	อุ่มเหม้า	That Phanom	ธาตุพนม	Nakhon Phanom	นครพนม	North-East
Umong	อุโมงค์	Mueang Lamphun	เมืองลำพูน	Lamphun	ลำพูน	North
Umphang	อุ้มผาง	Umphang	อุ้มผาง	Tak	ตาก	West
Up Mung	อูบมุง	Nong Wua So	หนองวัวซอ	Udon Thani	อุดรธานี	North-East
Uthai	อุทัย	Uthai	อุทัย	Phra Nakhon Si Ayutthaya	พระนครศรีอยุธยา	Central
Uthai Kao	อุทัยเก่า	Nong Chang	หนองฉาง	Uthai Thani	อุทัยธานี	Central
Uthai Mai	อุทัยใหม่	Mueang Uthai Thani	เมืองอุทัยธานี	Uthai Thani	อุทัยธานี	Central
Uthai Sawan	อุทัยสวรรค์	Na Klang	นากลาง	Nong Bua Lamphu	หนองบัวลำภู	North-East
Viang Mok	เวียงมอก	Thoen	เถิน	Lampang	ลำปาง	North

== See also ==
- Organization of the government of Thailand
- List of districts of Thailand
- List of districts of Bangkok
- List of tambon in Thailand
- Provinces of Thailand
- List of municipalities in Thailand
