= Bo Kaeo =

Bo Kaeo may refer to:

- Bo Kaeo Subdistrict in Na Khu District, Kalasin, Thailand
- Bo Kaeo, Chiang Mai, a subdistrict in Samoeng District, Chiang Mai
- Bo Kaeo Subdistrict in Na Muen District, Nan, Thailand
- Bo Kaeo Subdistrict in Wang Hin District, Sisaket, Thailand
- Bo Kaeo Subdistrict in Ban Muang District, Sakon Nakhon, Thailand

== See also ==
- Bokeo Province in Laos
