= Ai Na Lai Subdistrict =

Subdistrict in Nan Province

Ai Na Lai อ่ายนาไลย
- Subdistrict
- Interactive map of Ai Na Lai
- Country: Thailand
- Province: Nan
- District: Wiang Sa

Population (2010)
  - Total: 6,704
- Time zone: UTC+7 (ICT)

Ai Na Lai Subdistrict (Thailand)

Ai Na Lai (Thai: อ่ายนาไลย), is a tambon (subdistrict) of Wiang Sa District, Nan Province, Thailand. In 2010, it had a population of 6,704 people.

== Administration ==
The tambon is divided into eleven administrative villages (mubans).

No.	Name	Thai	Population
1.	Na Pa	นาผา	398
2.	Na Lai	นาไลย	361
3.	Phayao	พะเยา	337
4.	Yai Charoen-Rat	ใหญ่เจริญราษฎร์	551
5.	Ai	อ่าย	281
6.	Fung Min	ฝั่งหมิ่น	398
7.	Pang Mon	ปางมอญ	267
8.	Chompoo	ชมพู	450
9.	Muang Neng	ม่วงเนิ้ง	388
10.	South Na Lai	นาไลยใต้	354
11.	Huai Nam-Oon	ห้วยน้ำอุ่น	433
