= Mae Sap =

Mae Sap แม่สาบ
- Tambon
- Country: Thailand
- Province: Chiang Mai
- Amphoe: Samoeng

Population (2005)
  - Total: 3,464
- Time zone: UTC+7 (ICT)

Mae Sap (Thai: แม่สาบ) is a tambon (sub-district) of Samoeng District, in Chiang Mai Province, Thailand. In 2005 it had a population of 3,464 people. The tambon contains 10 villages.
