= Ta subdistrict =

Coordinates: 19°49′N 100°14′E

Ta ต้า
- Subdistrict
- Interactive map of Ta
- Country: Thailand
- Province: Chiang Rai
- District: Khun Tan

Population (2005)
  - Total: 13,091
- Time zone: UTC+7 (ICT)

Ta (Thai: ต้า) is a village and tambon (subdistrict) of Khun Tan District, in Chiang Rai Province, Thailand. In 2005 it had a population of 13,091 people. The tambon contains 20 villages.
