= Samoeng Tai =

Coordinates: 18°51′N 98°44′E

Samoeng Tai สะเมิงใต้
- Tambon
- Interactive map of Samoeng Tai
- Country: Thailand
- Province: Chiang Mai
- Amphoe: Samoeng

Population (2005)
  - Total: 5,366
- Time zone: UTC+7 (ICT)

Samoeng Tai (Thai: สะเมิงใต้) is a tambon (sub-district) of Samoeng District, in Chiang Mai Province, Thailand. In 2005 it had a population of 5,366 people over 11 villages.
