= Ao Luek Nuea =

Subdistrict in Krabi Province

Coordinates: 8.4089°N 98.7823°E

Ao Luek Nuea ตำบลอ่าวลึกเหนือ
- Subdistrict
- Interactive map of Ao Luek Nuea
- Country: Thailand
- Province: Krabi
- District: Ao Luek

Population (2025)
  - Total: 4,837
- Time zone: UTC+7 (ICT)

Ao Luek Nuea (Thai: ตำบลอ่าวลึกเหนือ, pronounced [ʔàːw lɯ́k nɯ̌a]) is a tambon (subdistrict) of Ao Luek District, in Krabi province, Thailand. In 2025, it had a population of 4,837 people.

== History ==
Ao Luek Nuea is located north of Ao Luek Noi Subdistrict. It was considered as a tambon in Ao Luek during the 20th century.

== Administration ==
=== Central administration ===
The tambon is divided into six administrative villages (mubans).

No.	Name	Thai	Population
1.	Naiyuan Kaek	ในยวนแขก	964
2.	Ao Luek Nuea	อ่าวลึกเหนือ	1,264
3.	Namjan	น้ำจาน	774
4.	Nong Kok	หนองกก	667
5.	Nong Waiphon	หนองหวายพน	302
6.	Tamphet	ถ้ำเพชร	886
