= Pa Tan, Chiang Rai =

Coordinates: 19°51′N 100°16′E

Pa Tan ป่าตาล
- Subdistrict
- Interactive map of Pa Tan
- Country: Thailand
- Province: Chiang Rai
- District: Khun Tan

Population (2005)
  - Total: 8,119
- Time zone: UTC+7 (ICT)

Pa Tan (Thai: ?) is a village and tambon (subdistrict) of Khun Tan District, in Chiang Rai Province, Thailand. In 2005 it had a population of 8119 people. The tambon contains 14 villages.
