= Samoeng Nuea =

Coordinates: 18.9720°N 98.7264°E

Samoeng Nuea สะเมิงเหนือ
- Tambon
- Interactive map of Samoeng Nuea
- Country: Thailand
- Province: Chiang Mai
- Amphoe: Samoeng

Population (2005)
  - Total: 3,426
- Time zone: UTC+7 (ICT)

Samoeng Nuea (Thai: สะเมิงเหนือ) is a tambon (sub-district) of Samoeng District, in Chiang Mai Province, Thailand. In 2005 it had a population of 3,426 people. The tambon contains six villages. It lies 73 km northwest of Chiang Mai.
