= Ang Thong, Ko Samui =

Subdistrict in Surat Thani Province

Coordinates: 9.5365°N 99.93632°E

Ang Thong ตำบลอ่างทอง
- Subdistrict
- Interactive map of Ang Thong
- Country: Thailand
- Province: Surat Thani
- District: Ko Samui

Population (2025)
  - Total: 4,733
- Time zone: UTC+7 (ICT)

Ang Thong (Thai: ตำบลอ่างทอง, pronounced [ʔàːŋ.tʰɔ̄ːŋ]) is a tambon (subdistrict) of Ko Samui District, in Surat Thani province, Thailand. In 2025, it had a population of 3,066 people.

== History ==
Ang Thong located in the northwestern part of Ko Samui. It later became the administrative center of Ko Samui and was organized as a tambon under Ko Samui District during administrative reforms during the 20th century.

== Administration ==
=== Central administration ===
The tambon is divided into six administrative villages (mubans).

No.	Name	Thai	Population
1.	Laem Din	แหลมดิน	1,099
2.	Hinlad	หินลาด	435
3.	Nathorn	หน้าทอน	1,422
4.	Lakhien	ตะเกียน	648
5.	Bang Makham	บางมะขาม	955
6.	Koh Plueay	เกาะพลวย	174
