= Yai Ra =

Coordinates: 12°36′29″N 102°01′18″E

Yai Ra ยายร้า
- Tambon
- Interactive map of Yai Ra
- Country: Thailand
- Province: Chanthaburi
- District: Tha Mai

Population (2017)
  - Total: 2,020
- Time zone: UTC+7 (TST)
- Postal code: 22120
- TIS 1099: 220302

Yai Ra (Thai: ยายร้า, pronounced [jāːj ráː]) is a tambon (subdistrict) of Tha Mai District, in Chanthaburi Province, Thailand. In 2017 it had a total population of 2,020 people.

== Administration ==
=== Central administration ===
The tambon has no administrative villages (muban).

=== Local administration ===
The whole area of the subdistrict is covered by the town (Thesaban Mueang) Tha Mai (เทศบาลเมืองท่าใหม่).
