= Ammarit Subdistrict =

Subdistrict in Ayutthaya Province

Coordinates: 14°28′20″N 100°21′30″E

Ammarit ตำบลอมฤต
- Subdistrict
- Interactive map of Ammarit
- Country: Thailand
- Province: Ayutthaya
- District: Phak Hai

Population (2025)
  - Total: 1,010
- Time zone: UTC+7 (ICT)

Ammarit (Thai: ตำบลอมฤต, pronounced [ʔam.pʰrɯ́t]) is a tambon (subdistrict) of Phak Hai District, in Ayutthaya province, Thailand. In 2025, it had a population of 1,010 people.

== History ==
Ammarit was a rural settlement in the central plain of Thailand. The area is located near waterways connected to the Chao Phraya River. The population consisted mainly of Thai people from nearby areas who established villages along canals and low-lying farmland. The subdistrict was later organized as a tambon under Phak Hai District during administrative reforms during the 20th century.

== Administration ==
=== Central administration ===
The tambon is divided into eleven administrative villages (mubans).

No.	Name	Thai	Population
1.	Jek	เจ็ก	82
2.	Khiao	เขียว	82
3.	Tuuk	ตึก	106
4.	Khlong Bang Khi	คลองบางคี่	67
5.	Huai Laen	ห้วยเลน	33
6.	Or	อ้อ	30
7.	Or	อ้อ	57
8.	Or	อ้อ	99
9.	Or	อ้อ	90
10.	Or	อ้อ	64
11.	Phak Khlong	ปากคลอง	300
