= Yang Moen =

Coordinates: 18°59′N 98°34′E

Yang Moen ยั้งเมิน
- Subdistrict
- Interactive map of Yang Moen
- Country: Thailand
- Province: Chiang Mai
- District: Samoeng

Population (2005)
  - Total: 3,845
- Time zone: UTC+7 (ICT)

Yang Moen (Thai: ยั้งเมิน) is a tambon (sub-district) of Samoeng District, in Chiang Mai Province, Thailand. In 2005 it had a population of 3,845 people. The tambon contains eight villages.
