= Amphaeng Subdistrict =

Subdistrict in Samut Sakhon Province

Coordinates: 13.6014°N 100.204°E

Amphaeng ตำบลอำแพง
- Subdistrict
- Interactive map of Amphaeng
- Country: Thailand
- Province: Samut Sakhon
- District: Ban Phaeo

Population (2025)
  - Total: 4,374
- Time zone: UTC+7 (ICT)

Amphaeng (Thai: ตำบลอำเเพง, pronounced [ʔam.pʰɛ̌ːŋ]) is a tambon (subdistrict) of Ban Phaeo District, in Samut Sakhon province, Thailand. In 2025, it had a population of 4,374 people.

== Administration ==
=== Central administration ===
The tambon is divided into seven administrative villages (mubans).

No.	Name	Thai	Population
1.	Chong San	ช่องสาร	180
2.	Tai Ban Pak Khlong	ท้ายบ้านปากคลอง	852
3.	Nai Ta Nuea	ในท่าเนื้อ	534
4.	Tai Nuea	ท่าเนื้อ	368
5.	Khlong Luang	คลองหลวง	1,168
6.	Charoen Suk	เจริญสุข	547
7.	Khlong Ta Cham	คลองตาชำ	703
