= U Lok =

Subdistrict in Surin Province

U Lok ตำบลอู่โลก
- Subdistrict
- Motto: ต้นแบบเศรษฐกิจพอเพียง อยู่เคียงวัฒนธรรม แกนนำพลังงาน มารฐานผ้าไหมใส่ใจสิ่งแวดล้อม พร้อมสู่อาเซียน
- Country: Thailand
- Province: Surin
- District: Lamduan

Government
  - Type: Subdistrict Administrative Organization (SAO)
  - Head of SAO: Under election

Population (2026)
  - Total: 3,793
- Time zone: UTC+7 (ICT)

U Lok (Thai: ตำบลอู่โลก, pronounced [jˈuː lˈə͡ʊk]) is a tambon (subdistrict) of Lamduan District, in Surin province, Thailand. In 2026, it had a population of 3,793 people.

== History ==
U Lok's old locals were from Sangkha district, who speak Khmer as their native language. It became a tambon in 1994. The first kamnan was Mr.Subin Phra-ngam.

== Administration ==
=== Central administration ===
The tambon is divided into eleven administrative villages (mubans).

No.	Name	Thai	Population	Phu Yai Ban
1.	Takhian	ตะเคียน	307	Prasit Temsuk
2.	Khok Koh	โคกเกาะ	588	Somphong Bunlert
3.	Nong Kan Jarn	หนองกันจารย์	200	Suwan Samnuek
4.	Chok Tai	โชกใต้	458	Suthit Suphisak
5.	Malu Jrung	มะลูจรุง	473	Chatri Phanpong
6.	U Lok	อู่โลก	495	Chamnean Bunlusuk
7.	Phet Jangwa	เพชรจังวา	313	Prasit Sawaengsit
8.	Nong Pring	หนองปรีง	282	Pongsap Sapmak
9.	Non Klang	โนนกลาง	232	Jumroen Jarat
10.	Mueang Thong	เมืองทอง	211	Jira Sanglai
11.	Buonrat	บวรรัตน์	234	Prida Umhaporn
