= Aranyakham Wari =

Subdistrict in Surat Thani Province

Aranyakham Wari ตำบลอรัญคามวารี
- Subdistrict
- Interactive map of Aranyakham Wari
- Country: Thailand
- Province: Surat Thani
- District: Khian Sa

Government
  - Type: Subdistrict Administrative Organization (SAO)
  - Head of SAO: Under election

Population (2026)
  - Total: 3,658
- Time zone: UTC+7 (ICT)

Aranyakham Wari (Thai: ตำบลอรัญคามวารี, pronounced [ʔā.rá.ná.kʰāːm.wāː.rīː]) is a tambon (subdistrict) of Khian Sa District, in Surat Thani province, Thailand. In 2026, it had a population of 3,658 people.

== History ==
Aranyakham Wari used to be ruled under Phuang Phromkhon Subdistrict, before it was separated by the locals which moved to the area.

== Administration ==
=== Central administration ===
The tambon is divided into five administrative villages (mubans).

| No. | Name | Thai | Population |
|---|---|---|---|
| 1. | Huai Mut | ห้วยมุด | 988 |
| 2. | Bang Yai | บางใหญ่ | 535 |
| 3. | Kra Sum | กระซุม | 728 |
| 4. | Mitr Pracharhat | มิตรประชาราษฎร์ | 357 |
| 5. | Harn Dam | หารดำ | 1,054 |
