= Bo Kaeo, Chiang Mai =

Bo Kaeo บ่อแก้ว
- Tambon
- Interactive map of Bo Kaeo
- Coordinates: 18.845213°N 98.570595°E
- Country: Thailand
- Province: Chiang Mai
- Amphoe: Samoeng

Population (2005)
  - Total: 7,135
- Time zone: UTC+7 (ICT)

Bo Kaeo (Thai: บ่อแก้ว) is a tambon (sub-district) of Samoeng District, in Chiang Mai Province, Thailand. In 2005, it had a population of 7,135 people. The tambon contains 10 villages.
