= Thai addressing system =

Location identification system

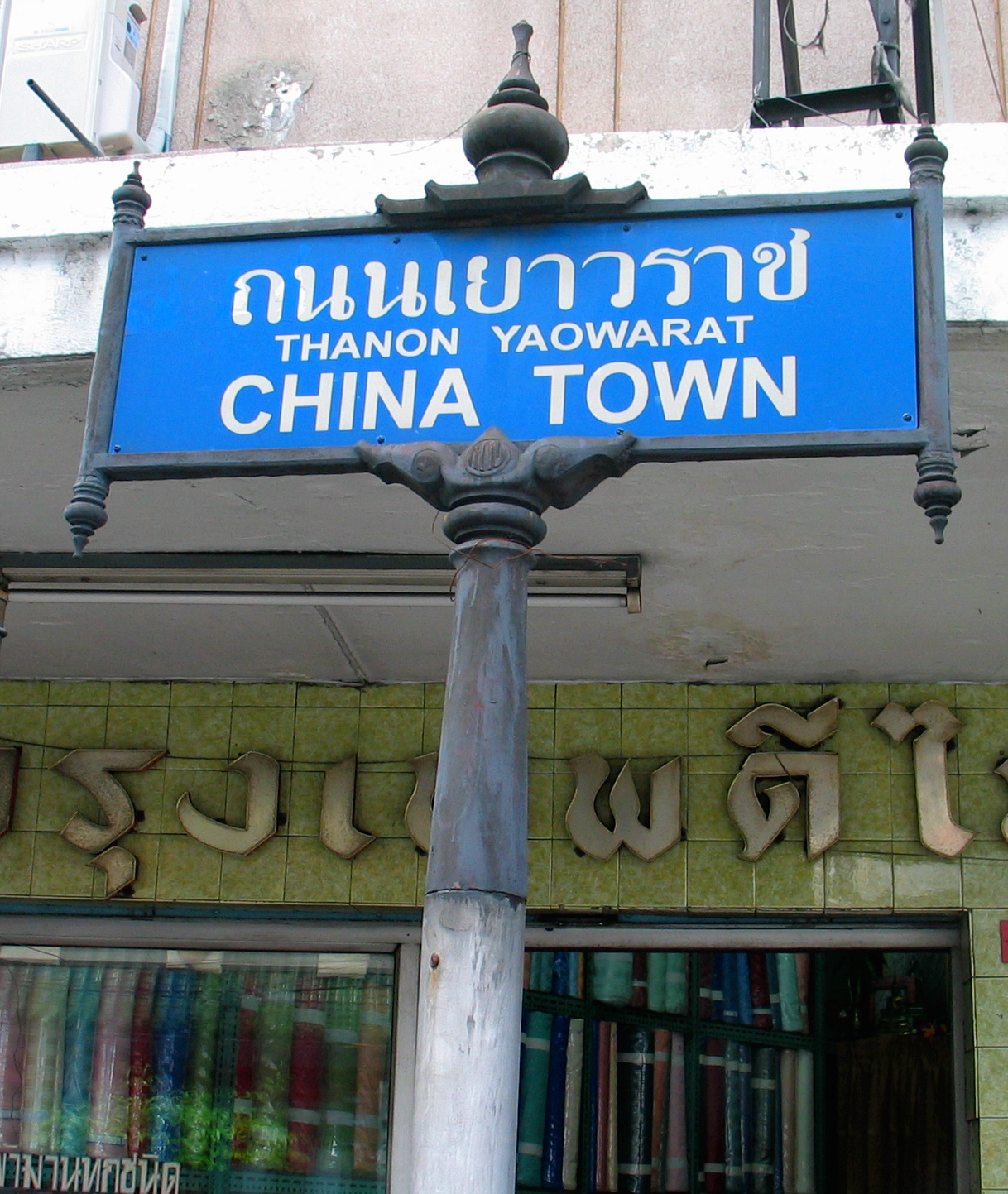
A sign for Yaowarat Road in Bangkok, Thailand

The Thai addressing system is used to identify a specific location in Thailand. It generally corresponds closely with the administrative divisions of Thailand.

== Address parts ==
With the exception of the initial plot and house number, Thai addresses are mostly in the Western order, starting from the smallest unit and progressing to the largest. The general format, as codified by the Universal Postal Union, is:

Plot/House number, Village
Road
Subdistrict, District
Province Postal Code
THAILAND

=== Plot, house and village ===
Thai muban (หมู่บ้าน) correspond only loosely to actual settlements, which may well have separate names, but these are not used for addresses. They are divided into groups mu (หมู่), often transliterated moo or abbreviated "M", which are divided into numbered plots (บ้านเลขที่ ban lek ti), which may (or may not) contain multiple houses. All numbers are assigned in the order they were originally registered, and generally do not follow any geographical or logical sequence.

In cities, a large named building often plays the role of "village", which is then followed by the apartment number.

=== Road ===
Roads do not correspond with administrative divisions, and they are consequently the most complicated and non-standardized part of a Thai address.

Main thoroughfares are thanon (ถนน), often abbreviated "Th", glossed as "road" or "Rd" in English, or omitted entirely. Smaller streets are soi (ซอย), which are numbered in increasing order, although odd and even sois are on different sides of the street. New sois added between old ones may receive annexes: for example, soi 7/1 would be located between soi 7 and soi 9. Small alleys may be called trok (ตรอก) instead of soi.

Large sois usually have names and are then also referred to as thanon, e.g. Thanon Ekkamai for Sukhumvit Soi 63, and these can have their own numbered sub-sois. Consequently Soi 4 off Soi 63 off Sukhumvit Rd can be referred to as any of Thanon Ekkamai Soi 4, Ekkamai Soi 4 or even Soi Ekkamai 4. For redundancy, both the name and the number of the large soi are sometimes added, as in Soi Ekkamai 4, Sukhumvit 63 Rd, where both Ekkamai and Sukhumvit 63 refer to the large soi.

=== District ===
Districts are called amphoe (อำเภอ), divided into subdistricts, tambon (ตำบล).

In Bangkok only, amphoe and tambon are replaced with khet (เขต) and khwaeng (แขวง) respectively.

=== Postal code ===
The postal code follows the province changwat (จังหวัด), or the special administrative region of Bangkok. Thai postal codes consist of five digits, where the first two digits identify the province, the third digit the district, and the remaining two the subdistrict. There are however several cases where more than one district shares the same third digit, or some muban have the postcode of a neighboring subdistrict. Nine-digit codes in the format NNNNN-NNNN are possible, but rarely used.

== Examples ==
- In practice, addresses in urban areas typically omit the village number, while rural addresses often have only the village number without a road. Often only one of town and district is used, since one or the other is usually sufficiently specific. For example, the address of the headquarters of Thailand Post is:

Thailand Post Co., Ltd.
111 Chaengwatthana Road
Laksi
Bangkok 10210-0299
Thailand

This corresponds to house number 111, Chaengwatthana Road, Thung Song Hong subdistrict (omitted), Laksi District, Bangkok Province.

- A coworking space in a small street in central Bangkok has the following address:

19 Soi Ekkamai 4
Sukhumvit 63 Rd.
Phra Khanong Nuea
Watthana
Bangkok 10110

This corresponds to house number 19 in the fourth soi off Sukhumvit Soi 63 (Ekkamai), Phra Khanong Nuea subdistrict, Watthana district, Bangkok Province.

- A typical address in Phuket might be:

7/22 M.5, Soi Ta-iat, Chaofa West Rd., T. Chalong
A. Phuket 83130 Thailand

This corresponds to house 22 on plot 7, Mu 5, Ta-iat lane, Chaofa West Road, Chalong Sub-district, Mueang Phuket District.

- The address of a guesthouse in rural Thailand is:

144/4 M.5
Ban Tham
Chiang Dao
Chiang Mai 50170
Thailand

This corresponds to house 4 on plot 144, Mu 5, Muban Ban Tham, Chiang Dao District, Chiang Mai Province.

== See also ==
- Address (geography)
- House numbering
