= At Samat, Mueang Nakhon Phanom =

Subdistrict in Nakhon Phanom

At Samat ตำบลอาจสามารถ
- Subdistrict
- Country: Thailand
- Province: Nakhon Phanom
- District: Nakhon Phanom

Government
  - Type: Subdistrict Administrative Organization (SAO)
  - Head of SAO: Under election

Population (2026)
  - Total: 4,982
- Time zone: UTC+7 (ICT)

At Samat (Thai: ตำบลอาจสามารถ, pronounced [ʔàːt sà.mâːt]) is a tambon (subdistrict) of Mueang Nakhon Phanom District, in Nakhon Phanom province, Thailand. In 2026, it had a population of 4,982 people.

== History ==
The old locals who lived in the subdistrict were a Thai Saek people who evacuated from Xishuangbanna to Vinh and then changed to the place near the Mekong River. The tribes divided into two groups, one of which went to Laos and the other, to Baan Khok Yao which later changed its name to Phai Lorm.

== Administration ==
=== Central administration ===
The tambon is divided into eleven administrative villages (mubans).

No.	Name	Thai	Population
1.	Hom	ห้อม	444
2.	Samran Nuea	สำราญเหนือ	517
3.	Samran Tai	สำราญใต้	379
4.	Phai Lorm	ไผ่ล้อม	392
5.	At Samat	อาจสามารถ	354
6.	At Samat	อาจสามารถ	394
7.	Na Huabor	นาหัวบ่อ	606
8.	Khamkerm	คำเกิ้ม	449
9.	Nasomdee	นาสมดี	493
10.	Phai Lorm Nuea	ไผ่ล้อมเหนือ	343
11.	Hom	ห้อม	600
