= Khun Tan district =

Khun Tan ขุนตาล
- District
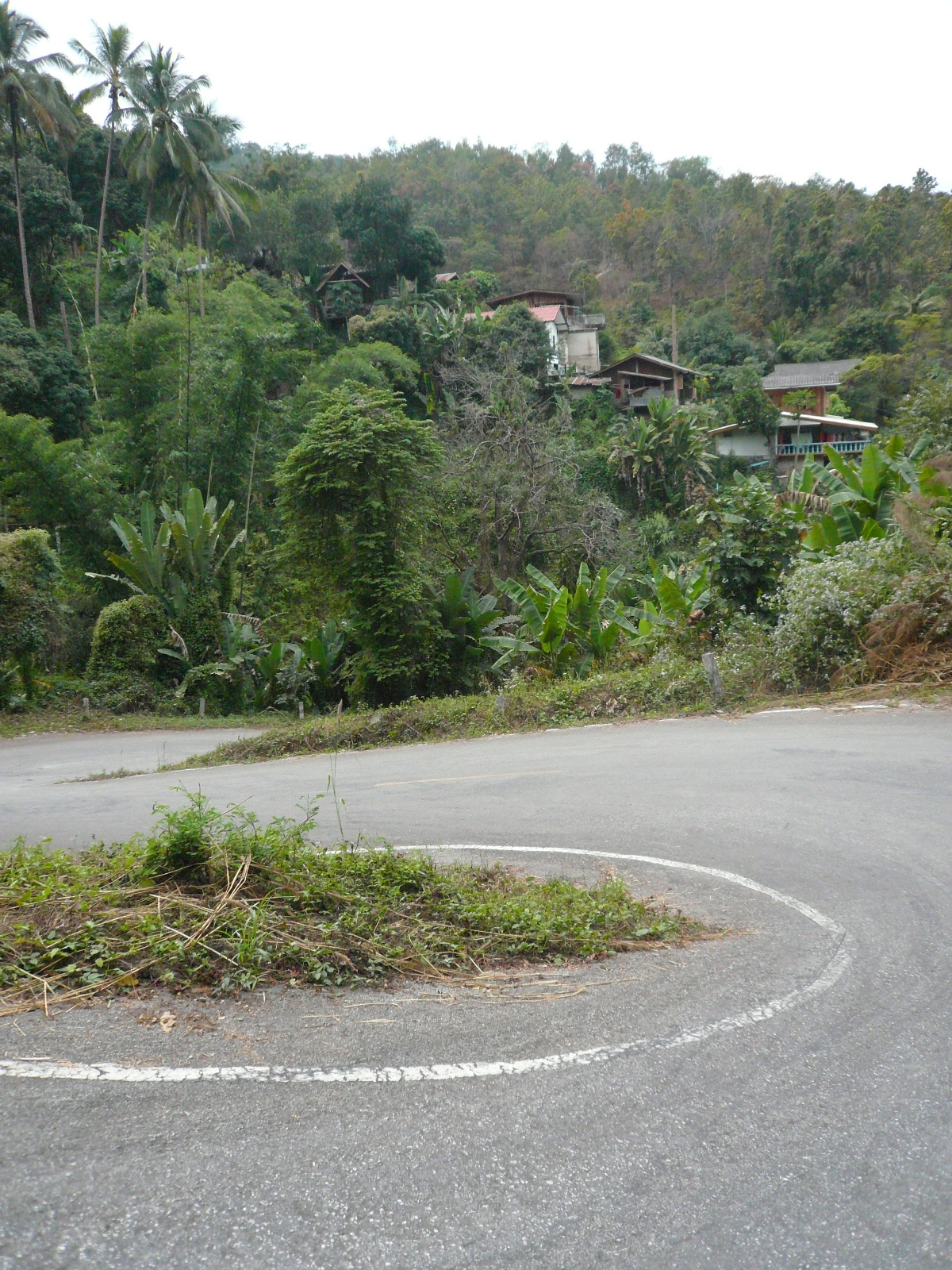
- Doi Khun Tan

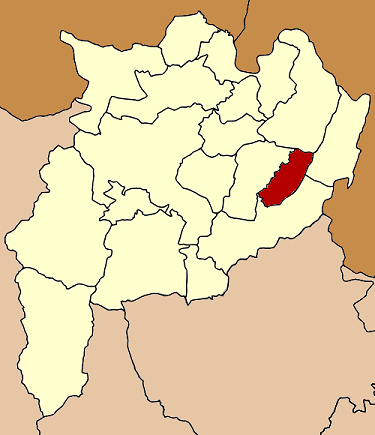
- District location in Chiang Rai province
- Coordinates: 19°50′0″N 100°15′30″E
- Country: Thailand
- Province: Chiang Rai
- Seat: Pa Tan

Area
  - Total: 234.0 km^{2} (90.3 sq mi)

Population (2005)
  - Total: 33,494
  - Density: 143.1/km^{2} (371/sq mi)
- Time zone: UTC+7 (ICT)
- Postal code: 57340
- Geocode: 5714

Khun Tan (Thai: ขุนตาล; IPA: [kʰǔn tāːn]; Northern Thai: ᨡᩩᩁᨲᩣ᩠ᩃ, IPA: [kʰǔn tǎːn]) is a district (amphoe) of Chiang Rai province, northern Thailand.

== History ==
The government separated three tambons of Thoeng district to create the minor district (king amphoe) Khun Ta on 1 April 1992. It was upgraded to a full district on 5 December 1996.

== Etymology ==
The name Khun Tan comes from Khun Tan River, which forms the backbone of Tambon Pa Tan. It is also the name of That Pa Tan, an important temple in the district.

Roughly translated, Khun Tan means 'mountain of palm trees', khun (ขุน) referring to a mountain range, and tan (ตาล) referring to Borassus flabellifer, a kind of palm tree. Similarly, the sub-district (tambon) Pa Tan translates to 'palm tree forest'.

== Geography ==
Neighboring districts are (from the northwest clockwise): Phaya Mengrai, Chiang Khong, Wiang Kaen, and Thoeng of Chiang Rai Province.

== Administration ==
The district is divided into three sub-districts (tambons), which are further subdivided into 55 villages (mubans). Ban Ta is a township (thesaban tambon) which covers parts of tambon Ta. There are a further three tambon administrative organizations (TAO).

| No. | Name | Thai name | Villages | Pop. |
|---|---|---|---|---|
| 1. | Ta | ต้า | 20 | 13,091 |
| 2. | Pa Tan | ป่าตาล | 14 | 8,119 |
| 3. | Yang Hom | ยางฮอม | 21 | 12,284 |
