= Ao Yai =

Subdistrict in Trat Province

Ao Yai ตำบลอ่าวใหญ่
- Subdistrict
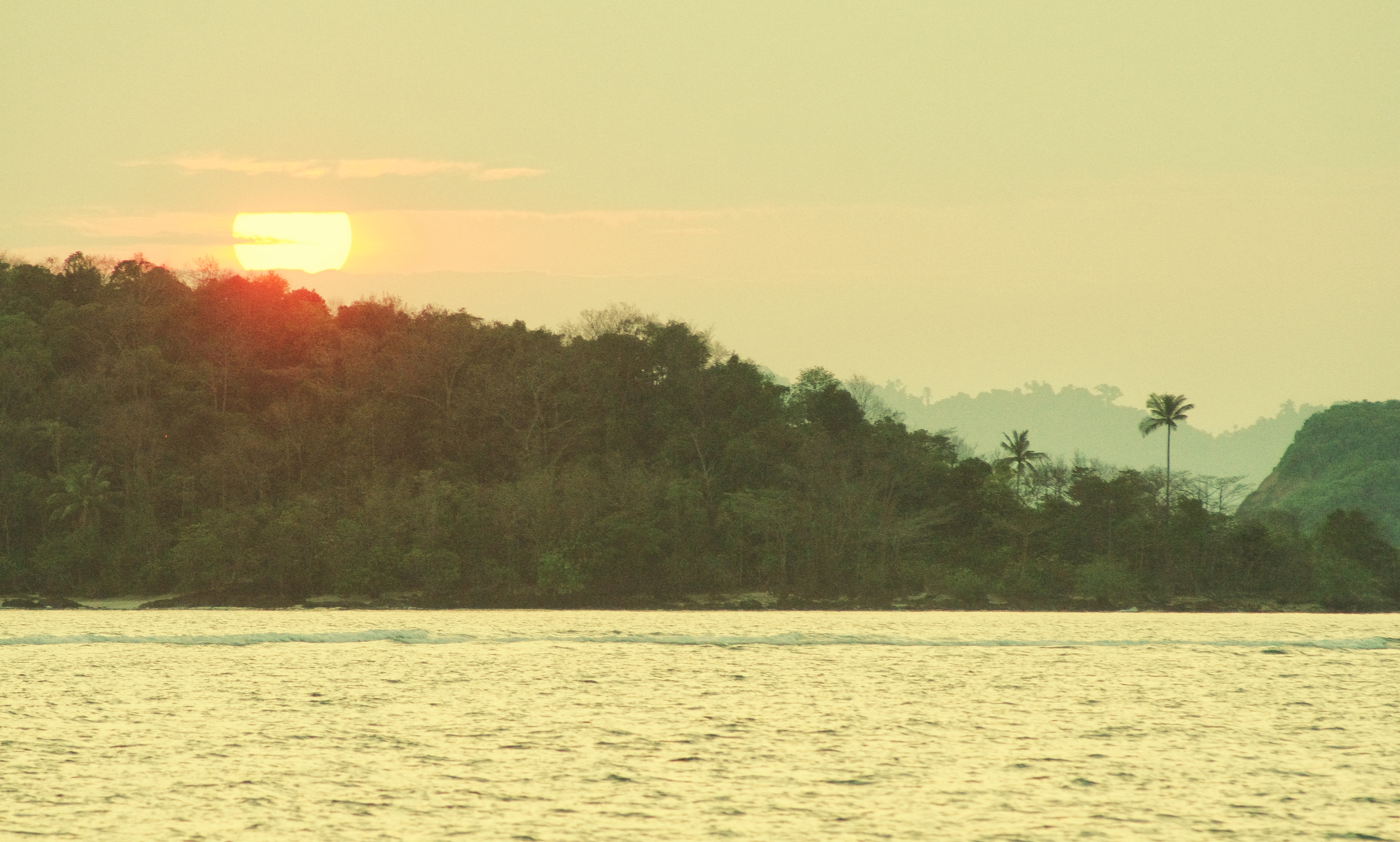
- Interactive map of Ao Yai
- Country: Thailand
- Province: Trat
- District: Mueang Trat

Government
  - Type: Subdistrict Administrative Organization (SAO)
  - Head of SAO: Under election

Population (2026)
  - Total: 3,578
- Time zone: UTC+7 (ICT)

Ao Yai (Thai: ตำบลอ่าวทอง, pronounced [ʔàːw jàj]) is a tambon (subdistrict) of Wang Wiset District, in Trang province, Thailand. In 2026, it had a population of 3,578 people.

== History ==
Before the tambon was called Ao Yai, it was called Ao Yuan, but later changed because the name is not suitable for the locals in nearby areas. The name Ao Yai is from the shore that became a bay by the waves.

== Administration ==
=== Central administration ===
The tambon is divided into six administrative villages (mubans).

No.	Name	Thai	Population	Phu Yai Ban
1.	Ao Yai	อ่าวใหญ่	988	Lave Rattanawan
2.	Ao Chor	อ่าวช่อ	853	Sathit Huangnam
3.	Laem Ya	แหลมหญ้า	371	Chuchart Haokamnert
4.	Laem Phrao	แหลมพร้าว	439	Wichit Kamhan
5.	Ao Kham	อ่าวขาม	530	Manit Chaichili
6.	Laem Sok	แหลมศอก	397	Tavi Rongsirikhun
