= Amnat Subdistrict =

Subdistrict in Amnat Charoen Province

Amnat ตำบลอำนาจ
- Subdistrict
- Interactive map of Amnat
- Country: Thailand
- Province: Amnat Charoen
- District: Lue Amnat

Population (2025)
  - Total: 3,609
- Time zone: UTC+7 (ICT)

Amnat (Thai: ตำบลอำนาจ, pronounced [ʔam.nát]) is a tambon (subdistrict) of Lue Amnat District, in Amnat Charoen province, Thailand. In 2025, it had a population of 3,609 people.

== Administration ==
=== Central administration ===
The tambon is divided into eleven administrative villages (mubans).

No.	Name	Thai	Population
1.	Amnat	อำนาจ	309
2.	Amnat	อำนาจ	403
3.	Yang Cha	ยางช้า	445
4.	Amnat	อำนาจ	191
5.	Amnat	อำนาจ	136
6.	Amnat	อำนาจ	547
7.	Yang Cha	ยางช้า	515
8.	Nong Phai	หนองไผ่	258
9.	Nong Hing	หนองหิ้ง	383
10.	Khok Charoen	โคกเจริญ	197
11.	Nong Phai	หนองไผ่	225
