= Ang Sila =

Town in Chonburi

Ang Sila อ่างศิลา
- Town Municipality
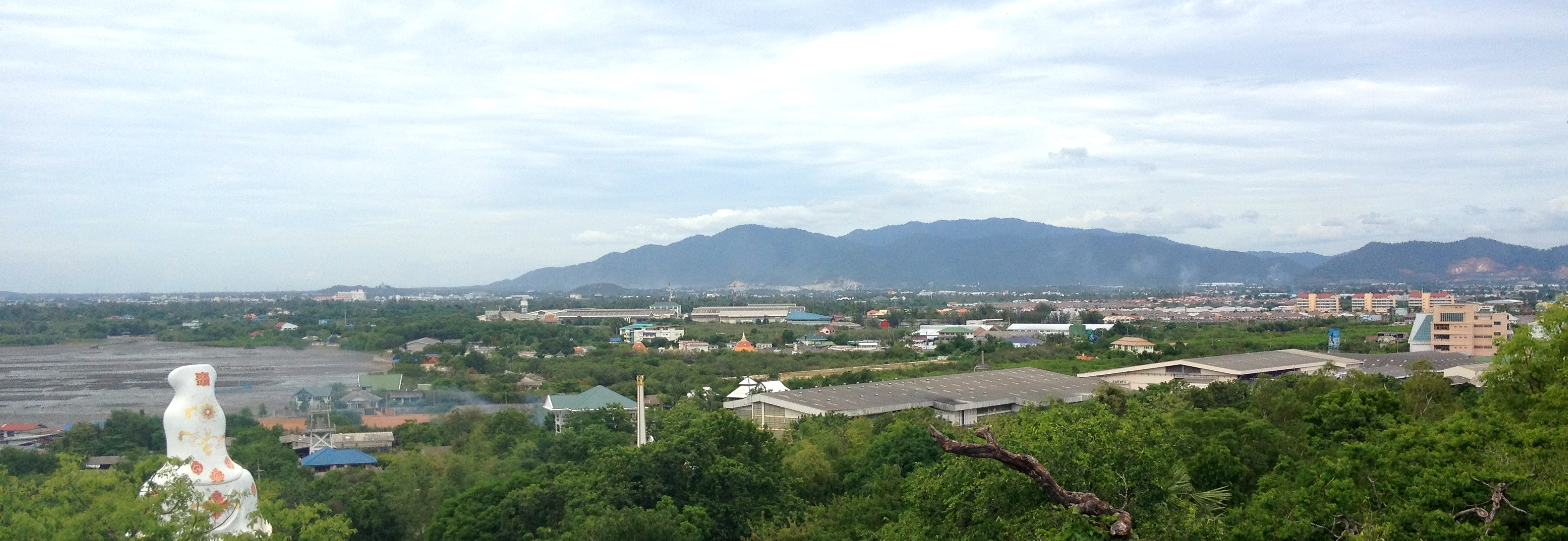
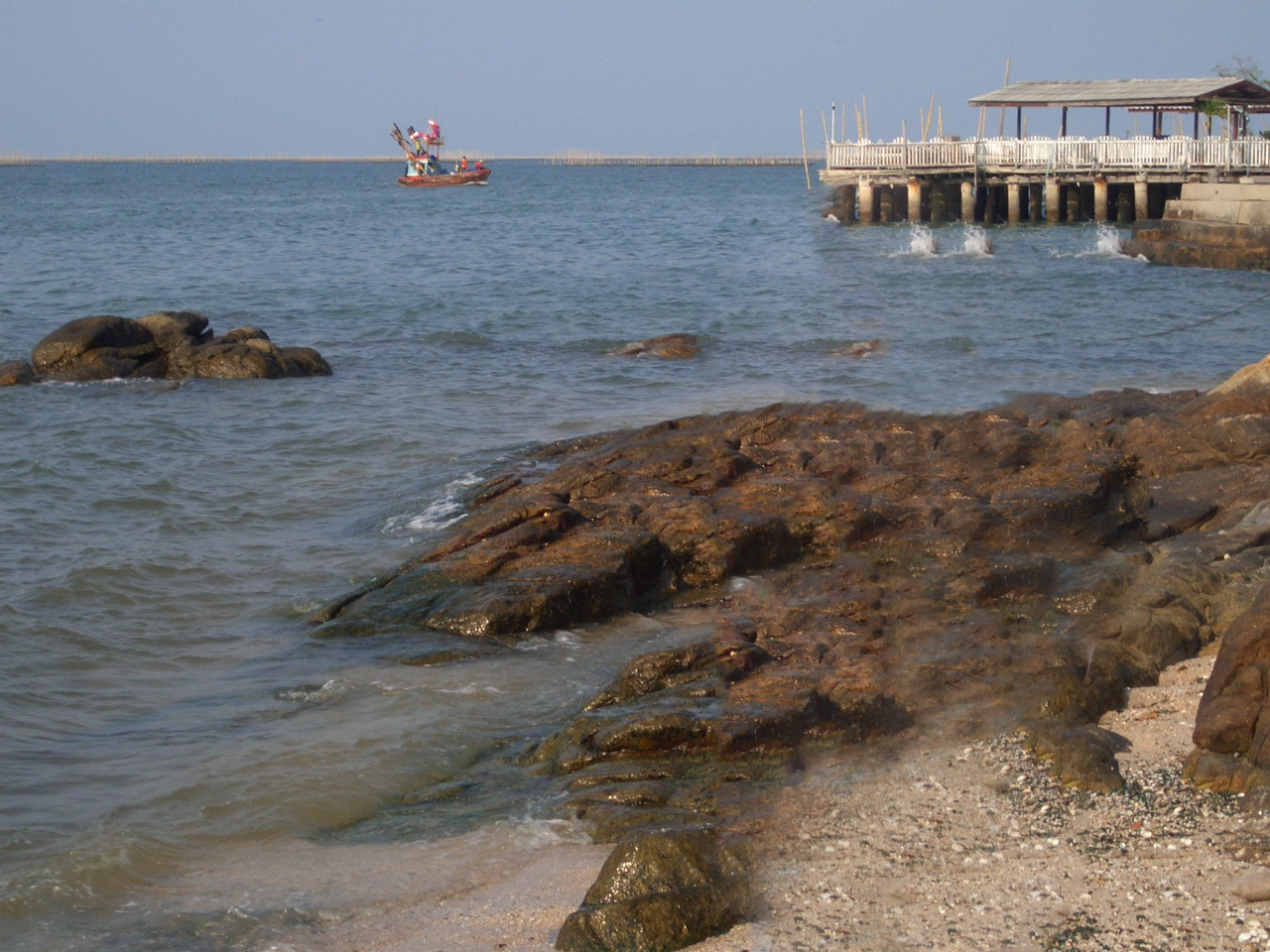
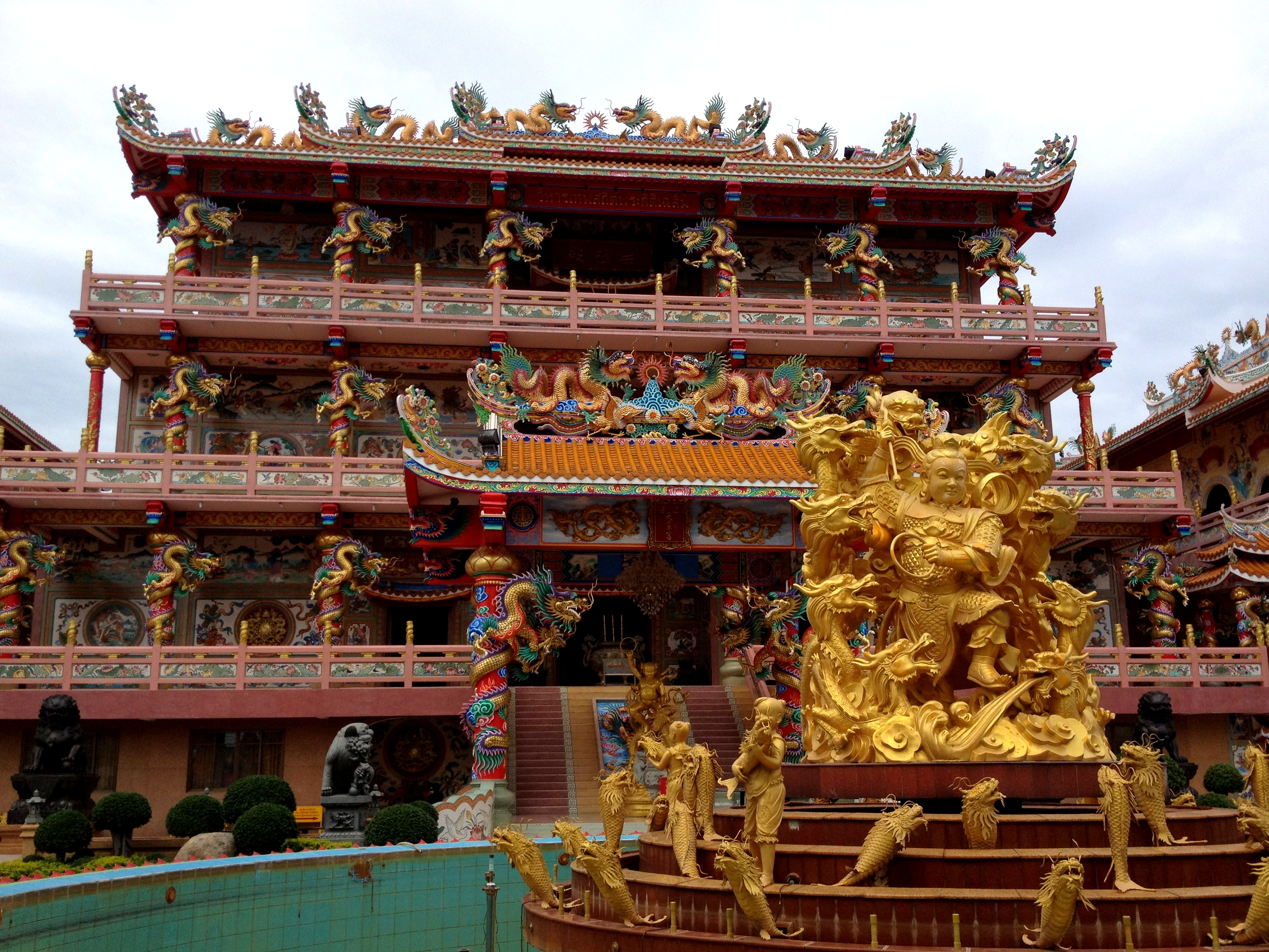
- Clockwise from top: view of Ang Sila from Khao Sam Muk; Na Jasa Tai Chue Shrine; and the seaside coast of the town

- Location on the Bay of Bangkok Location in Thailand
- Coordinates: 13°20′11″N 100°55′40″E
- Country: Thailand
- Province: Chonburi
- District: Mueang Chonburi

Government
  - Mayor: Mr. Winai

Population (2012)
  - Total: 30,981
- Time zone: UTC+7 (ICT)
- Area code: (+66) 38
- Website: angsilacity.go.th

Ang Sila (Thai: อ่างศิลา, pronounced [ʔàːŋ sìʔ.lāː]) is a town (Thesaban Mueang) in the Mueang Chonburi District (amphoe) of Chonburi Province in the eastern region of Central Thailand. Ang Sila is a fishing town and is 60 km from Bangkok.

== Toponym ==
Ang Sila was previously known as Ang Hin from the place's large granite and sandstone basins. The name Ang Sila means "Stone Basin". The stone is used to carve culinary mortars and pestles, rice grinders, and statuary.

== History ==
Following the end of World War II, Ang Sila witnessed an influx of Teochew Chinese migrants. They then began turning the area's stone into several products which became popular in Thailand.

== Culture ==
=== Cuisine ===
As a fishing town, a majority of the town's seafood is sourced directly from the Bay of Bangkok. Seafood is then sold at the Old Market fresh, which includes crabs, shrimps and fish. Established in 1876, the market was visited once by King Chulalongkorn.
