= Ang Hin Subdistrict =

Subdistrict in Ratchaburi Province

Coordinates: 13.462769°N 99.683303°E

Ang Hin ตำบลอ่างหิน
- Subdistrict
- Interactive map of Ang Hin
- Country: Thailand
- Province: Ratchaburi
- District: Pak Tho

Population (2025)
  - Total: 3,183
- Time zone: UTC+7 (ICT)

Ang Hin (Thai: ตำบลอ่างหิน, pronounced [ʔâːŋ hǐn]) is a tambon (subdistrict) of Pak Tho District, in Ratchaburi province, Thailand. In 2025, it had a population of 3,183 people.

== Administration ==
=== Central administration ===
The tambon is divided into six administrative villages (mubans).

No.	Name	Thai	Population
1.	Huai Noi	ห้วยน้อย	414
2.	Nong Kho	หนองโก	491
3.	Pong	โป่ง	406
4.	Nakok	นาโคก	517
5.	Ang Hin	อ่างหิน	579
6.	Nong Pak Thang	หนองปากทาง	346
7.	Nong Khaeng	หนองแก้ง	430
