= At Samat, At Samat =

Subdistrict in Roi Et

Coordinates: 15.8342°N 103.897°E

At Samat ตำบลอาจสามารถ
- Subdistrict
- Interactive map of At Samat
- Country: Thailand
- Province: Roi Et
- District: At Samat

Government
  - Type: Subdistrict Administrative Organization (SAO)
  - Head of SAO: Nuanrat Pantakhot

Population (2026)
  - Total: 7,538
- Time zone: UTC+7 (ICT)

At Samat (Thai: ตำบลอาจสามารถ, pronounced [ʔàːt sà.mâːt]) is a tambon (subdistrict) of At Samat District, in Roi Et province, Thailand. In 2026, it had a population of 7,538 people.

== History ==
The tambon used to be a sanitary subdistrict until later changed to a tambon in 1999.

== Administration ==
=== Central administration ===
The tambon is divided into seventeen administrative villages (mubans).

| No. | Name | Thai | Population |
|---|---|---|---|
| 1. | San | สั้น | 723 |
| 2. | Nong Khilek | หนองขี้เหล็ก | 370 |
| 3. | Bung Bao | บุ่งเบา | 526 |
| 4. | Samran | สำราญ | 555 |
| 5. | Rongkham | ร่องคำ | 473 |
| 6. | Hong Thong | หงส์ทอง | 564 |
| 7. | Chuchart | ชูชาติ | 383 |
| 8. | Anamai | อนามัย | 231 |
| 9. | Song | ส่อง | 223 |
| 10. | Sala | ศาลา | 423 |
| 11. | Yang-ngo | ยางโง๊ะ | 259 |
| 12. | Non Sa-at | โนนสะอาด | 505 |
| 13. | At Samat | อาจสามารถ | 855 |
| 14. | Mai Pattana | ใหม่พัฒนา | 302 |
| 15. | Chuchart | ชูชาติ | 606 |
| 16. | Dong Klang | ดอนกลาง | 197 |
| 17. | Song Mai | ส่องใหม่ | 343 |
