= Amphawa Subdistrict =

Subdistrict in Samut Songkhram Province

Coordinates: 13.424806°N 99.955889°E

Amphawa ตำบลอัมพวา
- Subdistrict
- Interactive map of Amphawa
- Country: Thailand
- Province: Samut Songkhram
- District: Amphawa

Population (2025)
  - Total: 3,836
- Time zone: UTC+7 (ICT)

Amphawa (Thai: ตำบลอัมพวา, pronounced [ʔām.pʰā.wāʔ]) is a tambon (subdistrict) of Amphawa District, in Samut Songkhram province, Thailand. In 2025, it had a population of 3,836 people.

== Administration ==
=== Central administration ===
The tambon is divided into seven administrative villages (mubans).

| No. | Name | Thai | Population |
|---|---|---|---|
| 1. | Community One | ชุมชนที่ 1 | 433 |
| 2. | Community Two | ชุมชนที่ 2 | 245 |
| 3. | Community Three | ชุมชนที่ 3 | 361 |
| 4. | Community Four | ชุมชนที่ 4 | 177 |
| 5. | Community Five | ชุมชนที่ 5 | 304 |
| 6. | Community Six | ชุมชนที่ 6 | 493 |
| 7. | Community Seven | ชุมชนที่ 7 | 572 |
| 8. | Community Eight | ชุมชนที่ 8 | 348 |
| 9. | Community Nine | ชุมชนที่ 9 | 363 |
| 10. | Community Ten | ชุมชนที่ 10 | 540 |
