= Ang Thong, Mueang Ratchaburi =

Subdistrict in Ratchaburi Province

Ang Thong ตำบลอ่างทอง
- Subdistrict
- Country: Thailand
- Province: Ratchaburi
- District: Ratchaburi

Population (2025)
  - Total: 8,265
- Time zone: UTC+7 (ICT)

Ang Thong (Thai: ตำบลอ่างทอง, pronounced [ʔàːŋ.tʰɔ̄ːŋ]) is a tambon (subdistrict) of Mueang Ratchaburi District, in Ratchaburi province, Thailand. In 2025, it had a population of 8,265 people.

== History ==
Ang Thong was considered as a tambon during the 20th century. It is located in the south of Mueang Ratchaburi District.

== Administration ==
=== Central administration ===
The tambon is divided into eleven administrative villages (mubans).

No.	Name	Thai	Population
1.	Yai	ใหญ่	660
2.	Don Ngiu	ดอนงิ้ว	251
3.	Tha Mafuang	ท่ามะเฟือง	536
4.	U-Mong	อุโมงค์	982
5.	Ang Thong	อ่างทอง	712
6.	Rongheep	โรงหีบ	1,522
7.	Huai	ห้วย	1,795
8.	Nong Sua	หนองเสือ	732
9.	Phot Dok	โพธิ์ดก	523
10.	Rai Mai	ไร้ใหม่	548
11.	Nong Kunak	หนองกุนาก	366
