= Ao Tong =

Coordinates: 7.855954°N 99.384402°E

Ao Tong ตำบลอ่าวตง
- Subdistrict
- Interactive map of Ao Tong
- Country: Thailand
- Province: Trang
- District: Wang Wiset

Government
  - Type: Subdistrict Administrative Organization (SAO)

Population (2025)
  - Total: 9,206
- Time zone: UTC+7 (ICT)

Ao Tong (Thai: ตำบลอ่าวตง, pronounced [ʔàːw tɔ̄ŋ]) is a tambon (subdistrict) of Wang Wiset District, in Trang province, Thailand. In 2025, it had a population of 9,206 people.

== History ==
The name Ao Tong is from the villagers that formed in the area near a bay and a land that is full of Rough Giant Bamboo. It was considered as a tambon for Wang Wiset District during the 20th century.

== Administration ==
=== Central administration ===
The tambon is divided into fifteen administrative villages (mubans).

No.	Name	Thai	Population	Phu Yai Ban
1.	Nong Chum Saeng	หนองชุมแสง	459	Apivit Chuchana
2.	Chai Pakdee	ไชยภักดี	747	Sampan Inrit
3.	Nai Pong	ในปง	830	Somkid Chuaithong
4.	Bang Khram	บางคราม	842	Jamroon Taemsang
5.	Kao Kanun	เก่าขนุน	664	Phuwanai Churit
6.	Phlu Yai	พรุใหญ่	678	Vichai Bunchuai
7.	Sai Yai	ไสใหญ่	617	Akhom Khonchatree
8.	Ton Saikhao	โตนทรายขาว	590	Jetjada Asachamnan
9.	Tonchee	โตนชี	697	Sornchai Thangkham
10.	Vang Hin	วังหิน	318	Vachanapak Thongdeeying
11.	Roichan Panwan	ร้อยชั้นพันวัง	548	Watchai Khupkunkan
12.	Huaichan	ห้วยชั้น	534	Thammarat Bunchuai
13.	Praek Do	แพรกโด	604	Sakda Bansan
14.	San Daeng	ส้านแดง	501	Kansita Chusaeng
15.	Yung-ngam	ยูงงาม	577	Somkiat Somsee
