= Wiang Sa =

There are two amphoe named Wiang Sa in Thailand, which, however, have two different Thai spellings. It could refer to:

- Amphoe Wiang Sa, Nan Province (เวียงสา)
- Amphoe Wiang Sa, Surat Thani Province (เวียงสระ)
