= Yang Hom =

Yang Hom ยางฮอม
- Subdistrict
- Interactive map of Yang Hom
- Coordinates: 19°55′20″N 100°18′20″E
- Country: Thailand
- Province: Chiang Rai
- District: Khun Tan

Population (2014)
  - Total: 11,316
- Time zone: UTC+7 (ICT)
- Postal code: 57340
- TIS 1099: 571403

Yang Hom (Thai: ยางฮอม) is a tambon (subdistrict) of Khun Tan District, in Chiang Rai Province, Thailand. In 2014 it had a population of 11,316 people.

== Administration ==
=== Central administration ===
The tambon is divided into 21 administrative villages (mubans).

No.	Name	Thai
1.	Ban Pa Bong Nam Lom	บ้านป่าบงน้ำล้อม
2.	Ban Pa Daeng	บ้านป่าแดง
3.	Ban Thung Si Koet	บ้านทุ่งศรีเกิด
4.	Ban Nam Phrae	บ้านน้ำแพร่
5.	Ban Huai Luang	บ้านห้วยหลวง
6.	Ban Huai Luang Tai	บ้านห้วยหลวงใต้
7.	Ban Chom Phu	บ้านชมภู
8.	Ban Yang Hom	บ้านยางฮอม
9.	Ban Huai Sak	บ้านห้วยสัก
10.	Ban Mai Phatthana	บ้านใหม่พัฒนา
11.	Ban Ngam Mueang	บ้านงามเมือง
12.	Ban Yang Hom	บ้านยางฮอม
13.	Ban Phaya Phiphak	บ้านพญาพิภักดิ์
14.	Ban Nam Phrae Nuea	บ้านน้ำแพร่เหนือ
15.	Ban Huai Sak	บ้านห้วยสัก
16.	Ban Dong Charoen	บ้านดงเจริญ
17.	Ban Yang Hom	บ้านยางฮอม
18.	Ban Chom Phu Tai	บ้านชมภูใต้
19.	Ban Nam Phrae Tai	บ้านน้ำแพร่ใต้
20.	Ban Huai Luang Nuea	บ้านห้วยหลวงเหนือ
21.	Ban Pa Daeng Mai	บ้านป่าแดงใหม่

=== Local administration ===
The subdistrict is covered by the subdistrict municipality (thesaban tambon) Yang Hom (เทศบาลตำบลยางฮอม)
