= Ao Luek Tai =

Subdistrict in Krabi Province

Ao Luek Tai ตำบลอ่าวลึกใต้
- Subdistrict
- Interactive map of Ao Luek Tai
- Country: Thailand
- Province: Krabi
- District: Ao Luek

Government
  - Type: Subdistrict Administrative Organization (SAO)
  - Head of SAO: Manot Jiempongpaisan

Population (2025)
  - Total: 7,338
- Time zone: UTC+7 (ICT)

Ao Luek Tai (Thai: ตำบลอ่าวลึกใต้, pronounced [ʔàːw lɯ́k tâj]) is a tambon (subdistrict) of Ao Luek District, in Krabi province, Thailand. In 2025, it had a population of 7,338 people.

== History ==
Ao Luek Tai is considered as a tambon on February 24, 1999.

== Administration ==
=== Central administration ===
The tambon is divided into seven administrative villages (mubans).

No.	Name	Thai	Population
1.	Huai Pritsana	ห้วยปริศนา	622
2.	Ao Luek Tai	อ่าวลึกใต้	2,126
3.	Khuan Pakmeang	ควนผักเหมียง	540
4.	Kao Phra	เขาพระ	1,126
5.	Thamsua	ถ้ำเสือ	431
6.	Khlong Suk	คลองสุข	850
7.	Khao Lak	เขาหลัก	1,643
