= Ang Thong, Srinagarindra =

Subdistrict in Phatthalung Province

Ang Thong ตำบลอ่างทอง
- Subdistrict
- Country: Thailand
- Province: Phatthalung
- District: Srinagarindra

Population (2025)
  - Total: 3,066
- Time zone: UTC+7 (ICT)

Ang Thong (Thai: ตำบลอ่างทอง, pronounced [ʔàːŋ.tʰɔ̄ːŋ]) is a tambon (subdistrict) of Srinagarindra District, in Phatthalung province, Thailand. In 2025, it had a population of 3,066 people.

== History ==
Ang Thong originated as a rural settlement in the lowland areas of the Phatthalung region. The population consisted mainly of local Muslim-Thais who established farming communities.

== Administration ==
=== Central administration ===
The tambon is divided into eight administrative villages (mubans).

| No. | Name | Thai | Population |
|---|---|---|---|
| 1. | Pra Du | ประดู่ | 506 |
| 2. | Suan Luang | สวนหลวง | 449 |
| 3. | Ang Thong | อ่างทอง | 446 |
| 4. | Loknun | โหล๊ะหนุน | 603 |
| 5. | Pak Praek | ปากแพรก | 306 |
| 6. | Koh Reang | เกาะเหรียง | 230 |
| 7. | Tontor | ต้นตอ | 269 |
| 8. | Koh Kuni | เกาะขัน | 257 |
