= Organization of the government of Thailand =

Thailand is a unitary state in Southeast Asia. The administrative services of the executive branch of the government are regulated by the National Government Organisation Act, BE 2534 (1991) (พระราชบัญญัติระเบียบบริหารราชการแผ่นดิน พ.ศ. 2534). Under this Act, the services are divided into three levels: central, provincial, and local.

== Central government ==
The central government (ราชการส่วนกลาง) consists of ministries, bureaus, and departments (กระทรวงทบวงกรม krasuang tha-buang krom).

Each of the ministries (กระทรวง krasuang) and bureaus (ทบวง tha-buang) is led by a minister (รัฐมนตรี ratthamontri) who is a member of the Council of Ministers (คณะรัฐมนตรี Khana Ratthamontri). A bureau may be an independent agency with the same status as a ministry or may be subject to a ministry. Currently, there are no bureaus.

The ministries and bureaus are divided into departments (กรม krom), inter alia. Each department is led by a director general (Thai: อธิบดี; RTGS: athipbodi).

There is a central government agency called Office of the Prime Minister (Thai: สำนักนายกรัฐมนตรี; RTGS: samnak nayok rattha montri). It is led by the prime minister (Thai: นายกรัฐมนตรี; RTGS: nayok rattha montri) and bears ministerial status.

There are also independent central government agencies. These agencies are not under any ministry, bureau, or department, but are directly subject to the prime minister. They are:

- Bureau of the Royal Household (Thai: สำนักพระราชวัง; RTGS: samnak phra ratcha wang) (BRH)
- Office of the Royal Development Projects Boards (สำนักงานคณะกรรมการพิเศษเพื่อประสานงานโครงการอันเนื่องมาจากพระราชดำริ) (RDPB)
- Royal Thai Police headquarters (Thai: สำนักงานตำรวจแห่งชาติ; RTGS: samnak ngan tamruat haeng chat) (RTP HQ)
- Office of National Buddhism (Thai: สำนักงานพระพุทธศาสนาแห่งชาติ; RTGS: samnak ngan phra phuttha satsana haeng chat) (ONaB)
- Royal Institute of Thailand (Thai: ราชบัณฑิตยสถาน; RTGS: ratcha bandittaya sathan) (RIT)
- Southern Border Provinces Administration Centre (Thai: ศูนย์อำนวยการบริหารจังหวัดชายแดนภาคใต้; RTGS: sun am nuai kan borihan changwat chai daen phak tai ) (SBPAC)

== Provincial government ==
The provincial government (ราชการส่วนภูมิภาค) consists of provinces (จังหวัด changwat). As of 31 December 2018 there were 76 provinces.

Each province is led by a Governor (ผู้ว่าราชการจังหวัด phu wa ratchakan changwat) and is divided into districts (อำเภอ amphoe). As of 2010, there were 878 districts throughout the country. In each province, there is one capital district (อำเภอเมือง amphoe mueang). For example, the capital district of Chiang Mai Province is Mueang Chiang Mai District (อำเภอเมืองเชียงใหม่ Amphoe Mueang Chiang Mai). The exception is Phra Nakhon Si Ayutthaya Province, where both the province and the capital district share the same name.

Each district is administered by a Chief District Officer (นายอำเภอ nai amphoe).

Until 2007, some provinces might include minor districts (กิ่งอำเภอ king amphoe). A minor district was established in large areas where the small number of residents did not warrant the formation of a district. Each minor district was administered by an Assistant Chief District Officer (ปลัดอำเภอ palat amphoe).

Governors, district chiefs, and assistant chief district officers are appointed by the central government.

== Local government ==
Local government (ราชการส่วนท้องถิ่น) consists of two types: ordinary and special.

=== Ordinary local government ===
Ordinary local government (ราชการส่วนท้องถิ่นรูปแบบทั่วไป) is of two forms.

1. Old form (แบบเก่า) under the Local Government Act, Buddhist Era 2457 (1914) (พระราชบัญญัติลักษณะปกครองท้องที่พุทธศักราช 2457) – Under this form, the subdistricts (ตำบล tambon) are established in the districts and minor districts. Each subdistrict is led by a subdistrict chief (กำนัน kamnan) and is divided into villages (หมู่บ้าน mu ban). Each village is led by a village chief (ผู้ใหญ่บ้าน phu yai ban; literally "village elder").
2. New form (แบบใหม่) under the Municipalities Act, BE 2496 (1953) (พระราชบัญญัติเทศบาล พ.ศ. 2496), the Subdistrict Councils and Subdistrict Administrative Organisations Act, BE 2537 (1995) (พระราชบัญญัติสภาตำบลและองค์การบริหารส่วนตำบล พ.ศ. 2537), and the Provincial Administrative Organisations Act, BE 2540 (1997) (พระราชบัญญัติองค์การบริหารส่วนจังหวัด พ.ศ. 2540) – The local government under this form is adopted in every province and consists of:
  1. 2,442 municipalities (เทศบาล thetsaban) which are divided into 30 city municipalities (เทศบาลนคร thetsaban nakhon), 179 town municipalities (เทศบาลเมือง thetsaban mueang) and 2,233 subdistrict municipalities (เทศบาลตำบล thetsaban tambon);
  2. administrative organisations (องค์การบริหาร ong kan borihan) which are divided into 76 provincial administrative organisations - PAO (องค์การบริหารส่วนจังหวัด ong kan borihan suan changwat) and 5,332 subdistrict administrative organisations - SAO (องค์การบริหารส่วนตำบล ong kan borihan suan tambon), these are for the local communities, which are not connected to a thetsaban.

Village chiefs are elected by local citizens. The chiefs of the villages in a subdistrict elect one of their number to also serve as the chief of the subdistrict. According to the Municipalities Act, BE 2496 (1953), when the new form of local government is adopted in any locality, the Minister of Interior may revoke the old form for that locality.

A city municipality is established in an area where there are at least 50,000 citizens, a town municipality, in an area where there are at least 10,000 citizens, and a subdistrict municipality, in any other area. The government of each municipality is divided into two branches: the executive branch led by a mayor (นายกเทศมนตรี nayok thetsamontri) and the legislative branch led by a municipal council (สภาเทศบาล sapha thetsaban). The mayors and the municipal councillors are directly elected by the local citizens.

As for an administrative organisation, the government is also divided into two branches: the executive branch led by an administrative organisation chief (นายกองค์การบริหาร nayok ong kan borihan) and the legislative branch led by an administrative organisation council (สภาองค์การบริหาร sapha ong kan borihan). The administrative organisation chiefs and councillors are directly elected by the local citizens.

=== Special local government ===
Special local government (ราชการส่วนท้องถิ่นรูปแบบพิเศษ) is established in some significant localities. Currently, this type of local government is found in:

1. Bangkok, called Bangkok Metropolitan Administration - BMA (กรุงเทพมหานคร Krung Thep Maha Nakhon) according to the Bangkok Metropolis Administrative Organisation Act, BE 2528 (1985) (พระราชบัญญัติระเบียบบริหารราชการกรุงเทพมหานคร พ.ศ. 2528), and
2. Pattaya, called Pattaya City (เมืองพัทยา Mueang Phatthaya; literally "Pattaya Town") pursuant to the Pattaya City Administrative Organisation Act, BE 2542 (1999) (พระราชบัญญัติระเบียบบริหารราชการเมืองพัทยา พ.ศ. 2542).

The governments of Bangkok and Pattaya are divided into two branches: executive and legislative.

Bangkok: The executive branch is led by the Governor of Bangkok (ผู้ว่าราชการกรุงเทพมหานคร Phu Wa Ratchakan Krung Thep Maha Nakhon) and the legislative branch is led by the Council of Bangkok (สภากรุงเทพมหานคร Sapha Krung Thep Maha Nakhon). The territory of Bangkok is divided into districts (เขต khet). There are now 50 districts. The government of each district is also divided into two branches: the executive branch led by a district director (ผู้อำนวยการเขต phu amnuai kan khet) and the legislative branch led by a district council (สภาเขต sapha khet). Each district is then divided into subdistricts (แขวง khwaeng). There are now 180 subdistricts. Each subdistrict is led by a subdistrict head (หัวหน้าแขวง hua na khwaeng).

The Governor of Bangkok and the Councillors of Bangkok are directly elected by the citizens of Bangkok. The district directors and the subdistrict heads are appointed by the Governor of Bangkok from amongst the Bangkok metropolitan officers (ข้าราชการกรุงเทพมหานคร), whilst the district councillors are directly elected by the local citizens.

Pattaya: The executive branch is led by the Mayor of Pattaya (นายกเมืองพัทยา Nayok Mueang Phatthaya) and the legislative branch is led by the Council of Pattaya (สภาเมืองพัทยา Sapha Mueang Phatthaya). The Mayor of Pattaya and the Councillors of Pattaya are directly elected by the citizens of Pattaya.

There is a plan to adopt the special local government in Chiang Mai, which would turn Chiang Mai Province into Chiang Mai Metropolis (เชียงใหม่มหานคร Chiang Mai Maha Nakhon). The plan was proposed to the National Assembly by the citizens of Chiang Mai in October 2013. However, it is regarded by the conservatives as separatism.

There is also a plan to establish Mae Sot City (นครแม่สอด Nakhon Mae Sot) in Tak Province. The city would cover the current areas of Mae Sot City Municipality (เทศบาลนครแม่สอด) and Tha Sai Luat Subdistrict Municipality (เทศบาลตำบลท่าสายลวด). The plan would also result in the dissolution of both municipalities.

== Historical subdivisions ==
Monthon in 1900

From the beginning of the 20th century until 1932 there was an additional subdivision called monthon (มณฑล, circle), with some of the larger monthons subdivided into boriwen (บริเวณ, area). The first provinces were named mueang (เมือง, township) as those developed from the historical city-states. There were both mueang directly dependent from Bangkok (thus similar to the modern province), as well as mueang under the supervision of a more powerful neighbouring mueang, or part of the semi-independent tributary states. In 1906 the transition to the term changwat started, which was finalised in 1916.

After the abolition of the monthon, a new subdivision named "region" (ภาค, Phak) was established. At first there were four regions with changing outlines. These were changed into nine regions in 1951. In 1956 these regions were abolished as well.

A former municipal level were the sukhaphiban (sanitation districts, สุขาภิบาล), which were mostly responsible for sanitary tasks like waste management. The administrative level was created in 1908, in May 1999 all were converted into subdistrict municipalities.

Until 2007 minor districts (king amphoe) were a special kind of districts, still partially a subordinate of another district. Usually newly created districts at first became minor districts and were upgraded to full districts after a few years. On 24 August 2007 all 81 minor districts were upgraded to full districts, despite many still not meeting the prerequisites for becoming a full district.

1368 (Uthong)

1390 (Ramesuan)

1432 (Borommarachathirat II)

1468 (Borommatrailokkanat)

1545 (Chairachathirat)

1603 (Sanphet II)

1680 (Ramathibodi III)

1686 (Ramathibodi III)

1727 (Sanphet IX)

1767 (Borommaracha III)

1780 (Borommaracha IV)

1800 (Rama I)

1805 (Rama I)

1824 (Rama II)

1837 (Rama III)

1850 (Rama III)

1862 (Rama IV)

1882 (Rama V)

1890 (Rama V)

1893 (Rama V)

1900 (Rama V)

1906 (Rama V)

1908 (Rama V)

1916 (Rama VI)

1932 (Rama VII)

1941 (Rama VIII)

1945 (Rama VIII)

1946 (Rama VIII)

1950 (Rama IX)

1973 (Rama IX)

2023 (Rama X)

== Informal subdivisions ==
Bangkok and its vicinity (ปริมณฑล, pari monthon), including five adjacent provinces are referred to as Bangkok Metropolitan Region (Thai: กรุงเทพมหานครและปริมณฑล).

There are several definitions of regions in Thailand. The one used by the National Statistical Office defines four regions - north, northeast, south and central.

== See also ==
- List of districts of Thailand
- List of districts of Bangkok
- List of tambon in Thailand
- Provinces of Thailand
- List of cities in Thailand
- Thai addressing system
- Decentralisation in Thailand
- Administrative divisions of Thailand
