= Akkha Kham Subdistrict =

Subdistrict in Roi Et Province

Akkha Kham อัคคะคำ
- Subdistrict
- Country: Thailand
- Province: Roi Et
- District: Pho Chai

Population (2017)
  - Total: 8,240
- Time zone: UTC+7 (ICT)

Akkha Kham (Thai: อัคคะคำ, pronounced [ʔàk-khá kham]) is a tambon (subdistrict) of Pho Chai District, in Roi Et Province, Thailand. In 2017, it had a population of 8,240 people.

== Administration ==
=== Central administration ===
The tambon is divided into fourteen administrative villages (mubans).

| No. | Name | Thai | Population |
|---|---|---|---|
| 1. | Akkha | อัคคะ | 573 |
| 2. | Na Lao | นาเลา | 888 |
| 3. | Phon Tao | โพนเฒ่า | 741 |
| 4. | Akkha | อัคคะ | 823 |
| 5. | Akkha | อัคคะ | 404 |
| 6. | Nam Klieang | น้ำเกลี้ยง | 651 |
| 7. | Thep Prasit | เทพประสิทธิ์ | 574 |
| 8. | Non Sa-at | โนนสะอาด | 858 |
| 9. | Phibun Chai | พิบูลย์ไชย | 430 |
| 10. | Uai-Sri | อวยศรี | 490 |
| 11. | Sri Somdet | ศรีสมเด็จ | 537 |
| 12. | Phon Tao | โพนเฒ่า | 388 |
| 13. | Akkha | อัคคะ | 418 |
| 14. | Phibun Chai | พิบูลย์ไชย | 465 |
