= USS LST-924 =

US Tank Landing Ship

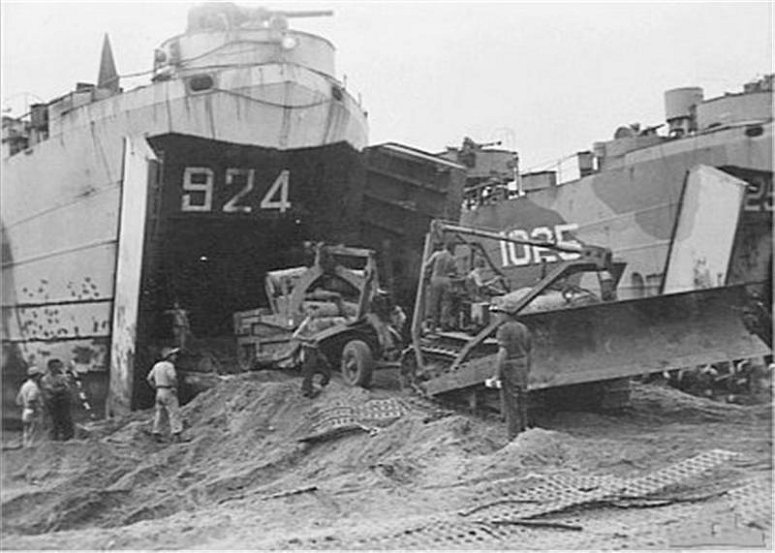
- USS LST-924 and LST-1025 beached at Tarakan Island, Borneo, 1 May 1945, while the heavy equipment of No. 61 Airfield Construction Wing RAAF is being unloaded.

History

United States
- Name: LST-924
- Builder: Bethlehem-Hingham Shipyard, Hingham, Massachusetts
- Yard number: 3394
- Laid down: 8 May 1944
- Launched: 17 June 1944
- Commissioned: 10 July 1944
- Decommissioned: 13 June 1946
- Stricken: 3 July 1946
- Identification: Hull symbol: LST-924; Code letters: NVOU
- Honors and awards: 4 × battle star
- Fate: Sold to the Royal Thai Navy, 5 May 1947

Thailand
- Name: Angthong
- Namesake: Ang Thong Islands
- Acquired: 5 May 1947
- Decommissioned: 2006
- Identification: Hull symbol: LST-1 (1947–1998); LST-711 (1998–)
- Notes: She was discarded in 1978, but restored to service c. 1994–1995.

General characteristics
- Class & type: LST-542-class tank landing ship
- Displacement: 1,625 long tons (1,651 t) (light); 4,080 long tons (4,145 t) (full (seagoing draft with 1,675 short tons (1,520 t) load); 2,366 long tons (2,404 t) (beaching)
- Length: 328 ft (100 m) oa
- Beam: 50 ft (15 m)
- Draft: Unloaded: 2 ft 4 in (0.71 m) forward; 7 ft 6 in (2.29 m) aft; Full load: 8 ft 3 in (2.51 m) forward; 14 ft 1 in (4.29 m) aft; Landing with 500 short tons (450 t) load: 3 ft 11 in (1.19 m) forward; 9 ft 10 in (3.00 m) aft; Limiting 11 ft 2 in (3.40 m); Maximum navigation 14 ft 1 in (4.29 m)
- Installed power: 2 × 900 hp (670 kW) Electro-Motive Diesel 12-567A diesel engines; 1,800 shp (1,300 kW)
- Propulsion: 1 × Falk main reduction gears; 2 × Propellers
- Speed: 11.6 kn (21.5 km/h; 13.3 mph)
- Range: 24,000 nmi (44,000 km; 28,000 mi) at 9 kn (17 km/h; 10 mph) while displacing 3,960 long tons (4,024 t)
- Boats & landing craft carried: 2 x LCVPs
- Capacity: 1,600–1,900 short tons (3,200,000–3,800,000 lb; 1,500,000–1,700,000 kg) cargo depending on mission
- Troops: 16 officers, 147 enlisted men
- Complement: 13 officers, 104 enlisted men
- Armament: Varied, ultimate armament; 2 × twin 40 mm (1.57 in) Bofors guns; 4 × single 40 mm Bofors guns; 12 × 20 mm (0.79 in) Oerlikon cannons

Service record
- Operations: Leyte landings (5–18 November 1944); Lingayen Gulf landings (4–18 January 1945); Visayan Island landings (18 March, 29 March–1 April 1945); Tarakan Island operation (27 April–5 May 1945)
- Awards: China Service Medal; American Campaign Medal; Asiatic–Pacific Campaign Medal; World War II Victory Medal; Navy Occupation Service Medal w/Asia Clasp; Philippine Republic Presidential Unit Citation; Philippine Liberation Medal

USS LST-924 was an LST-542-class tank landing ship in the United States Navy. Like many of her class, she was not named and is properly referred to by her hull designation.

== Construction ==
LST-924 was laid down on 8 May 1944, at Hingham, Massachusetts, by the Bethlehem-Hingham Shipyard; launched on 17 June 1944; and commissioned on 10 July 1944.

== Service history ==
During World War II, LST-924 was assigned to the Asiatic-Pacific theater. She took part in the Leyte landings in November 1944, the Lingayen Gulf landings in January 1945, the Visayan Island landings in March and April 1945, and the Tarakan Island operation in April and May 1945.

Following the war, LST-924 performed occupation duty in the Far East and saw service in China until mid-May 1946. She was decommissioned on 13 June 1946, and struck from the Navy list on 3 July, that same year. On 5 May 1947, the ship was sold to the Royal Thai Navy (RTN) where it operated as HTMS Angthong (LST-1).

== Thai Service ==
HTMS Angthong (Thai: เรือหลวงอ่างทอง) had been discarded by the Royal Thai Navy by 1978, but was later restored to service circa 1994–1995. In 1998, she was renumbered LST-711. She was decommissioned in 2006. The name was later given to a new ship, an Endurance-class landing platform dock ordered from Singapore and delivered on 19 April 2012, commissioned as HTMS Angthong (791).

== Awards ==
LST-924 earned four battle star for World War II service.

== Bibliography ==
Online resources

- "LST-924". Dictionary of American Naval Fighting Ships. Naval History and Heritage Command. This article incorporates text from this source, which is in the public domain.
- "Bethlehem-Hingham, Hingham MA". www.ShipbuildingHistory.com. 11 August 2011.
- "USS LST-924". NavSource. 26 September 2015.
- "Navy officially welcomes HTMS Ang Thong to fleet". Bangkok Post. 20 April 2012.
- Rumakom, Kittipong; Ngernbamrung, Apirom (2013). "เรือหลวงอ่างทอง เรือยกพลขึ้นบกลำใหม่ล่าสุดของกองทัพเรือ" (PDF). Royal Thai Naval Dockyard Journal: 32–41. ISSN 0857-4766. Archived from the original (PDF) on 9 July 2021.
