= Samoeng district =

Samoeng สะเมิง
- District
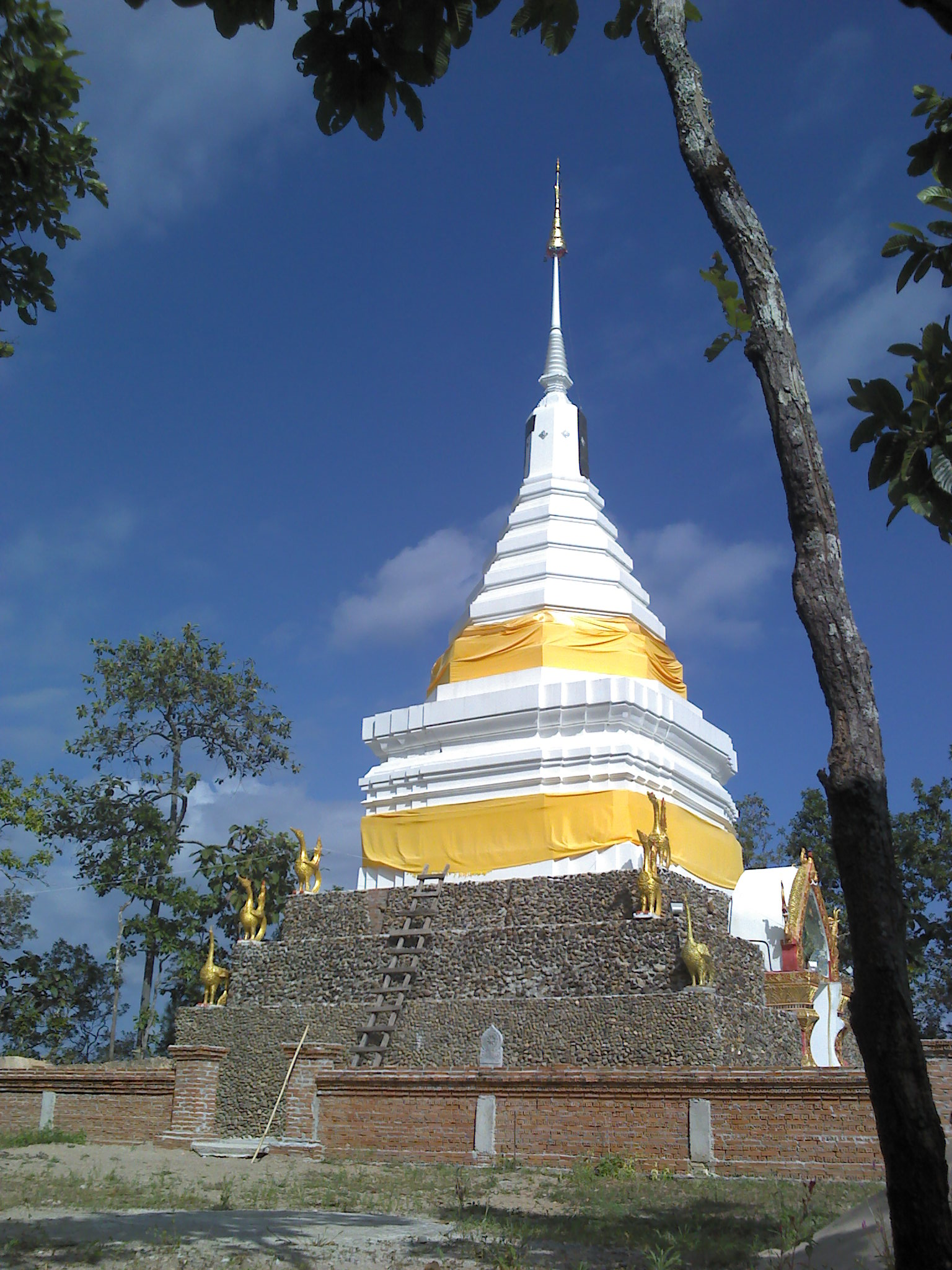
- Phra That Doi Nok

- District location in Chiang Mai province
- Coordinates: 18°50′53″N 98°43′57″E
- Country: Thailand
- Province: Chiang Mai
- Seat: Samoeng

Area
  - Total: 898.0 km^{2} (346.7 sq mi)

Population (2005)
  - Total: 23,236
  - Density: 25.9/km^{2} (67/sq mi)
- Time zone: UTC+7 (ICT)
- Postal code: 50250
- Geocode: 5008

Samoeng (Thai: สะเมิง) is a district (amphoe) of Chiang Mai province in northern Thailand.

== Geography ==
Neighbouring districts are (from the north clockwise) Mae Taeng, Mae Rim, Hang Dong, Mae Wang, Mae Chaem, and Galyani Vadhana of Chiang Mai Province and Pai of Mae Hong Son province.

== Environment ==
Most years, air quality in Samoeng declines in March–April due to field burning and forest fires. In April 2019, Samoeng's air quality declined to levels heretofore unseen. To blame were forest fires in the hills surrounding the valley. Readings by the Chiang Mai Air Quality Health Index (CMAQHI) showed air quality index (AQI) scores in Samoeng's tambon Yang Moen had exceeded 500, the highest level the AQI can record. The AQI measures a spectrum of air pollutants including PM2.5, PM10, and carbon dioxide. PM2.5 is particulate matter (PM) with a diameter of less than 2.5 micrometres, or about 3% the diameter of a human hair. It can lodge in the lungs and enter blood vessels, leading to respiratory and cardiovascular disease.

== History ==
The district was originally created in 1902 as a minor district (king amphoe). It was upgraded to a full district in 1908, downgraded to a minor district in 1938, and returned to its current designation as a full district in 1958.

== Administration ==
The district is divided into five sub-districts (tambon), which are further subdivided into 45 villages (muban). Samoeng Tai is a sub-district municipality (thesaban tambon), which covers parts of tambon Samoeng Tai. There are a further four tambon administrative organizations (TAO).

No.	Name	Thai name	Villages	Pop.
1.	Samoeng Tai	สะเมิงใต้	11	5,366
2.	Samoeng Nuea	สะเมิงเหนือ	6	3,426
3.	Mae Sap	แม่สาบ	10	3,464
4.	Bo Kaeo	บ่อแก้ว	10	7,135
5.	Yang Moen	ยั้งเมิน	8	3,845

== Economy ==
The Royal Project Agricultural Station Pang Da near Samoeng Tai conducts plant research, primarily on tropical fruit trees, temperate fruit trees such as the fig, flowers, beans, vetiver, rapid-growth trees, and medical cannabis.
