= Ang Kaeo Subdistrict =

Subdistrict in Ang Thong Province

Coordinates: 14.654825°N 100.392876°E

Ang Kaeo ตำบลอ่างแก้ว
- Subdistrict
- Interactive map of Ang Kaeo
- Country: Thailand
- Province: Ang Thong
- District: Pho Thong

Population (2025)
  - Total: 2,568
- Time zone: UTC+7 (ICT)

Ang Keao (Thai: ตำบลอ่างแก้ว, pronounced [ʔàːŋ kʰɛ̌ːw]) is a tambon (subdistrict) of Pho Thong District, in Ang Thong province, Thailand. In 2025, it had a population of 2,568 people.

== Administration ==
=== Central administration ===
The tambon is divided into seven administrative villages (mubans).

No.	Name	Thai	Population
1.	Khlong Katum	คลองกระทุ่ม	173
2.	Khlong Makham	คลองมะขาม	282
3.	Khlong Makham	คลองมะขาม	170
4.	Khlong Sarai	คลองสาหร่าย	586
5.	Huai Ling Tok	ห้วยลิงตก	406
6.	Huai Ling Tok	ห้วยลิงตก	526
7.	Huai Ling Tok	ห้วยลิงตก	424
