= Ang Khiri Subdistrict =

Subdistrict in Chanthaburi Province

Ang Khiri ตำบลอ่างคีรี
- Subdistrict
- Country: Thailand
- Province: Chanthaburi
- District: Makham

Population (2025)
  - Total: 4,279
- Time zone: UTC+7 (ICT)

Ang Khiri (Thai: ตำบลอ่างคีรี, pronounced [ʔàːŋ kʰīːrīː]) is a tambon (subdistrict) of Makham District, in Chanthaburi province, Thailand. In 2025, it had a population of 4,279 people.

== Administration ==
=== Central administration ===
The tambon is divided into eight administrative villages (mubans).

No.	Name	Thai	Population
1.	Ang	อ่าง	594
2.	Suan Saeng Thong	สางแสงทอง	712
3.	Ang Klang	อ่างกลาง	619
4.	Wangthap	วังตาบ	371
5.	Ang Lang	อ่างล่าง	284
6.	Oknak	อกหนัก	856
7.	Nong Naroung	หนองนาโรง	352
8.	Khlong Mali	คลองมาลิ	491
