= List of tambon in Thailand =

As of 5 December 1996 there were 7,255 subdistricts (tambon) in Thailand. An alphabetical list of them follows:

- List of tambon in Thailand (A)
- List of tambon in Thailand (B)
- List of tambon in Thailand (C)
- List of tambon in Thailand (D)
- List of tambon in Thailand (E–F)
- List of tambon in Thailand (H–I)
- List of tambon in Thailand (K)
- List of tambon in Thailand (L)
- List of tambon in Thailand (M)
- List of tambon in Thailand (N–O)
- List of tambon in Thailand (P)
- List of tambon in Thailand (R)
- List of tambon in Thailand (S)
- List of tambon in Thailand (T)
- List of tambon in Thailand (U–V)
- List of tambon in Thailand (W)
- List of tambon in Thailand (Y)
