= Ao Luek Noi =

Subdistrict in Krabi Province

Coordinates: 8.29604°N 98.75559°E

Ao Luek Noi ตำบลอ่าวลึกน้อย
- Subdistrict
- Motto: เศรษฐกิจดี ท้องถิ่นก้าวหน้า พัฒนาแหล่งเรียนรู้ เปิดประตูการท้องเที่ยว
- Interactive map of Ao Luek Noi
- Country: Thailand
- Province: Krabi
- District: Ao Luek

Government
  - Type: Subdistrict Administrative Organization (SAO)
  - Head of SAO: Brapit Langsang

Population (2025)
  - Total: 5,896
- Time zone: UTC+7 (ICT)

Ao Luek Noi (Thai: ตำบลอ่าวลึกน้อย, pronounced [ʔàːw lɯ́k nɔ́y]) is a tambon (subdistrict) of Ao Luek District, in Krabi province, Thailand. In 2025, it had a population of 5,896 people.

== History ==
Ao Luek Noi is located near the Andaman Sea and high mountains. It was considered as a tambon in Ao Luek during the 20th century.

== Administration ==
=== Central administration ===
The tambon is divided into six administrative villages (mubans).

No.	Name	Thai	Population
1.	Raiyai	ไร่ใหญ่	878
2.	Bakan	บากัน	1,975
3.	Ao Luek Noi	อ่าวลึกน้อย	736
4.	Nakae	นาแค	645
5.	Khuan-O	ควนโอ	1,237
6.	Kirivong	คีรีวงค์	442
