= Ang Thong, Banphot Phisai =

Subdistrict in Nakhon Sawan Province

Ang Thong ตำบลอ่างทอง
- Subdistrict
- Country: Thailand
- Province: Nakhon Sawan
- District: Banphot Phisai

Government
  - Type: Subdistrict Administrative Organization (SAO)
  - Head of SAO: Nilrat Tiangtat

Population (2025)
  - Total: 2,630
- Time zone: UTC+7 (ICT)

Ang Thong (Thai: ตำบลอ่างทอง, pronounced [ʔàːŋ.tʰɔ̄ːŋ]) is a tambon (subdistrict) of Banphot Phisai District, in Nakhon Sawan province, Thailand. In 2025, it had a population of 2,630 people.

== History ==
Ang Thong was considered a tambon on February 23, 1997. The current kamnan of the tambon is Prakhlong Ditsala.

== Administration ==
=== Central administration ===
The tambon is divided into seven administrative villages (mubans).

No.	Name	Thai	Population	Phu Yai Ban
1.	Tha Raet	ท่าแรด	330	Prakhlong Ditsala
2.	Khlong	คลอง	573	Prateep Buapan
3.	Ang Thong	อ่างทอง	477	Amporn Silawat
4.	Tha Raet	ท่าแรต	195	Thongguai Kamkhom
5.	Nong Khiwuoa	หนองขี้วัว	305	Sathit Ampart
6.	Thung Kaituen	ทุ่งไก่เถื่อน	349	Sompong Bunnoi
7.	Khlong Tai	คลองใต้	401	Manita Buapan
