= Ang Thong, Chiang Kham =

Subdistrict in Phayao Province

Ang Thong ตำบลอ่างทอง
- Subdistrict
- Country: Thailand
- Province: Phayao
- District: Chiang Kham

Population (2025)
  - Total: 5,906
- Time zone: UTC+7 (ICT)

Ang Thong (Thai: ตำบลอ่างทอง, pronounced [ʔàːŋ.tʰɔ̄ːŋ]) is a tambon (subdistrict) of Chiang Kham District, in Phayao province, Thailand. In 2025, it had a population of 5,906 people.

== History ==
Ang Thong was ruled under the Phayao Kingdom but later got occupied by Kingdom of Thailand. It was organized as a tambon under Chiang Kham District during administrative reforms on August 1, 1983, after getting split from Nam Waen Subdistrict. The first kamnan of the tambon is Lao Katip which served until 1970 and was changed to Supachai Daennarin who is the present kamnan.

== Administration ==
=== Central administration ===
The tambon is divided into thirteen administrative villages (mubans).

No.	Name	Thai	Population	Phu Yai Ban
1.	Nuen Samakkhi	เนินสามัคคี	614	Kamphan Yubunlert
2.	Doyor Isan	ดอยออีสาน	662	Tongkham Sripaengmoon
3.	Lai Pattana	หล่ายพัฒนา	269	Plaern Viengkam
4.	Bonoi	บ่อน้อย	673	Kammee Phumiprathet
5.	Nongbua Nguen	หนองบัวเงิน	470	Nopporn Daennasan
6.	Na Charoen	นาเจริญ	516	Sorn Kaewwanna
7.	Jambon	จำบอน	427	Ratchapong Jaikwang
8.	Son Buloei	ส้นปูเลย	372	Pornsri Kamdaeng
9.	Pang Motdaeng	ปางมดแดง	374	Arthorn Tutong
10.	Pang Motdaeng Mai	ปางมดแดงใหม่	547	Thawon Yubonnitr
11.	Nuen Saiklang	เนินสายกลาง	283	Vijan Katip
12.	Jambon	จำบอน	336	Bunruang Katip
13.	Na Charoen	นาเจริญ	363	Rujira Katip
