= Ang Thong, Mueang Kamphaeng Phet =

Subdistrict in Kamphaeng Phet Province

Coordinates: 16.3898°N 99.5208°E

Ang Thong ตำบลอ่างทอง
- Subdistrict
- Motto: ตลาดกล้วยไข่เชิดหน้า กลุ่มย้อมผ้าศิลาแลง แก้วขนเหล็กส่องแสง ธรรมชาติแหล่งเขาพริกงาม วัฒนธรรมของชนเผ่า ถิ่นเมืองเก่าชาวสยาม กระยาสารทเลื่องลือนาม เป็นบทความนาม "อ่างทอง"
- Interactive map of Ang Thong
- Country: Thailand
- Province: Kamphaeng Phet
- District: Kamphaeng Phet

Population (2025)
  - Total: 13,018
- Time zone: UTC+7 (ICT)

Ang Thong (Thai: ตำบลอ่างทอง, pronounced [ʔàːŋ.tʰɔ̄ːŋ]) is a tambon (subdistrict) of Mueang Kamphaeng Phet District, in Kamphaeng Phet province, Thailand. In 2025, it had a population of 13,018 people.

== History ==
The name Ang Thong is from refers to a water basin in the area. It was organized as a tambon under its present district during administrative reforms in the 20th century.

== Administration ==
=== Central administration ===
The tambon is divided into twenty-one administrative villages (mubans).

No.	Name	Thai	Population
1.	Pak Ang	ปากอ่าง	1,963
2.	Thasao Kradong	ท่าเสากระโดง	1,027
3.	Pak Ang Nai	ปากอ่างใน	443
4.	Dong Manao	ดงมะนาว	756
5.	Wang Takhian	วังตะเคียน	903
6.	Nong Yaiphao	หนองยายเภา	366
7.	Santisuk	สันติสุข	317
8.	Khlong Du	คลองดู่	329
9.	Santisuk Tai	สันติสุขใต้	959
10.	Nong Yao	หนองยาว	384
11.	Nongkham Charoensuk	หนองขามเจริญสุข	751
12.	Dat Thongcharoen	ดาดทองเจริญ	382
13.	Bo Klangdong	บ่อกลางดง	391
14.	Thung Ruangthong	ทุ่งรวงทอง	734
15.	Mo Samran	มอสำราญ	802
16.	Ang Hin	อ่างหิน	210
17.	Jormkhwaen	จอมแขวง	425
18.	Wang Takhian Nuea	วังตะเคียนเหนือ	548
19.	Wang Takhian Tai	วังตะเคียนใต้	439
20.	Dard Nuea	ดาดเหนือ	530
21.	Shap Tasao	ทรัพย์ท่าเสา	359
