= Phon Sai district =

Phon Sai โพนทราย
- District
- District location in Roi Et province
- Coordinates: 15°29′16″N 103°59′47″E
- Country: Thailand
- Province: Roi Et
- Seat: Phon Sai

Area
  - Total: 215.852 km^{2} (83.341 sq mi)

Population (2005)
  - Total: 27,420
  - Density: 127/km^{2} (330/sq mi)
- Time zone: UTC+7 (ICT)
- Postal code: 45240
- Geocode: 4513

Phon Sai (Thai: โพนทราย, pronounced [pʰōːn sāːj]) is a district (amphoe) in the southeastern part of Roi Et province, northeastern Thailand.

== Geography ==
Neighboring districts are (from the west clockwise): Suwannaphum and Nong Hi of Roi Et Province; Sila Lat and Rasi Salai of Sisaket province; and Rattanaburi of Surin province.

== History ==
The minor district (king amphoe) Phon Sai was established on 16 November 1976, when the two tambons, Phon Sai and Samkha, were split off from Suwannaphum district. It was upgraded to a full district on 25 May 1989.

== Administration ==
The district is divided into five sub-districts (tambons), which are further subdivided into 58 villages (mubans). Phon Sai is a township (thesaban tambon) which covers parts of tambon Phon Sai. There are a further four tambon administrative organizations (TAO).

No.	Name	Thai name	Villages	Pop.
1.	Phon Sai	โพนทราย	14	6,385
2.	Samkha	สามขา	9	4,477
3.	Si Sawang	ศรีสว่าง	15	7,448
4.	Yang Kham	ยางคำ	10	4,403
5.	Tha Hat Yao	ท่าหาดยาว	10	4,707
