= Mitrella mesnyi =

Mitrella mesnyi is a botanical scientific name that may refer to:

- Sphaerocoryne affinis, a woody climbing plant native to Malesia, of which M. mesnyi is an illegitimate synonym
- Sphaerocoryne lefevrei, a small tree native to Indochina, known as lamduan in Thailand, and rumduol in Cambodia, where it has also been described as Mitrella mesnyi
