= Ban Niam railway station =

Railway station in Thailand

Ban Niam บ้านเนียม

General information
- Location: Khayung Subdistrict, Uthumphon Phisai District, Sisaket Province
- Coordinates: 15°07′34″N 104°13′29″E
- Owner: State Railway of Thailand
- Line: Northeastern Line
- Platforms: 1
- Tracks: 2

Other information
- Station code: นเ.

Services
Preceding station	State Railway of Thailand	Following station
Ban Tae Halt towards Hua Lamphong or Krung Thep Aphiwat	Northeastern Line	Sisaket towards Ubon Ratchathani
Location

Ban Niam station (Thai: สถานีบ้านเนียม) is a railway station located in Khayung Subdistrict, Uthumphon Phisai District, Sisaket Province. It is a class 3 railway station located 504.00 km (313.2 mi) from Bangkok railway station.
