= Nong Hi district =

Nong Hi หนองฮี
- District
- District location in Roi Et province
- Coordinates: 15°36′37″N 103°59′26″E
- Country: Thailand
- Province: Roi Et
- Seat: Nong Hi

Area
  - Total: 132.0 km^{2} (51.0 sq mi)

Population (2005)
  - Total: 25,696
  - Density: 5.14/km^{2} (13.3/sq mi)
- Time zone: UTC+7 (ICT)
- Postal code: 45140
- Geocode: 4519

Nong Hi (Thai: หนองฮี, pronounced [nɔ̌ːŋ hīː]; Northeastern Thai: หนองฮี, pronounced [nɔ̌ːŋ hîː]) is a district (amphoe) of Roi Et province, Thailand.

== Geography ==
Neighboring districts are (from the south clockwise): Phon Sai, Suwannaphum, and Phanom Phrai of Roi Et Province, and Sila Lat of Sisaket province.

== History ==
The minor district (king amphoe) was created on 1 April 1995, when the three tambons Nong Hi, Sao Hae, and Duk Ueng were split off from Phanom Phrai district.

The Thai government on 15 May 2007, upgraded all 81 minor districts to full districts. With publication in the Royal Gazette on 24 August, the upgrade became official.

== Administration ==
The district is divided into four sub-districts (tambons), which are further subdivided into 54 villages (mubans). There are no municipal (thesaban) areas. There are four tambon administrative organization (TAO).

No.	Name	Thai name	Villages	Pop.
1.	Nong Hi	หนองฮี	17	6,477
2.	Sao Hae	สาวแห	7	3,156
3.	Duk Ueng	ดูกอึ่ง	17	8,688
4.	Den Rat	เด่นราษฎร์	13	7,375
