= Mongkol Uthok =

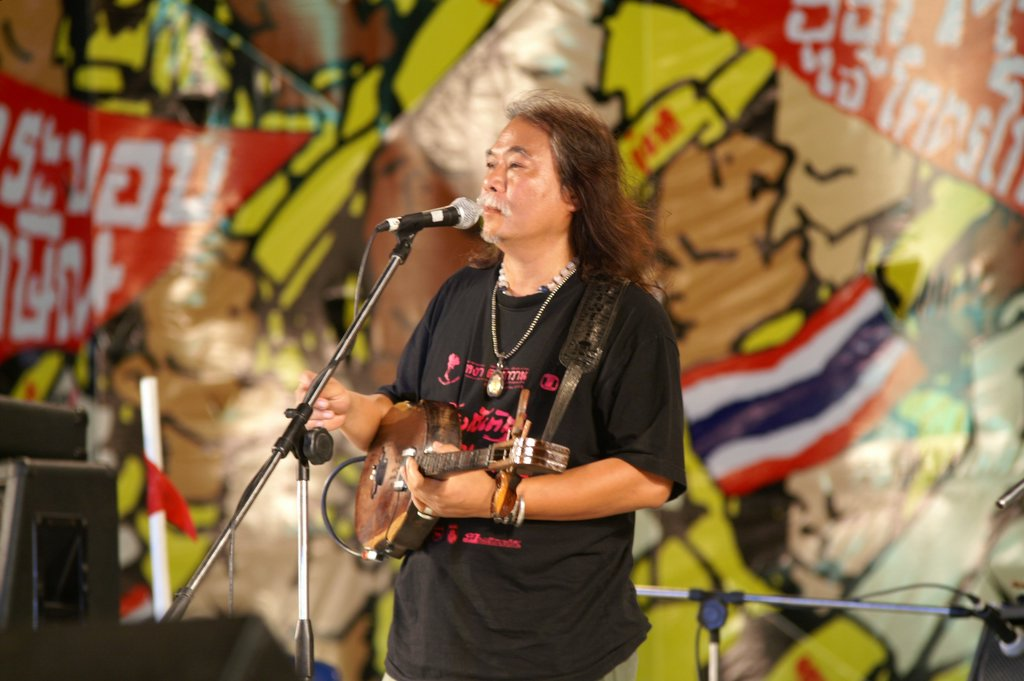

Background information
- Born: May 10, 1951; Phanom Phrai District, Roi Et Province, Thailand
- Died: August 15, 2018 (aged 67)
- Occupations: Singer, musician, songwriter, artist
- Instruments: Pin, mouth organ, guitar, backing vocals

Mongkol Uthok (มงคล อุทก), also known as Wong Caravan (Thai band), was a Thai folk musician. He was a former member of the Bangladesh Band along with Thongkran Thana (Ud) before joining the band of Surachai Jantimatorn (Nga) to form Caravan in 1974.

Mongkol Uthok was born in Phanom Phrai, Roi Et Province. He formed the Bangladesh Band while studying at Techno Korat (now known as Rajamangala University of Technology Isan). He graduated in Fine Arts and played instruments such as the phin, guitar, and mouth organ. He composed songs for Caravan, including "Get Up and Fight" and "Red Rose".

Mongkol Uthok also wrote a book recounting his experiences in the music scene called "Songs of Phin Phanom Phrai," first published in 2001.

== Personal life ==
He had one niece named Chuthamani Uthok (original name: Mayuree), nicknamed Kratai, born on September 10, 1996.

== Death ==
At 01:30 a.m. on September 15, 2018, the police of Bang Sri Muang Police Station in Nonthaburi province were notified of a death at Somkiat Jungle Food Restaurant, No. 36/6, Moo 5, Nakhon in Road, Bang Sri Mueng Sub-district, Mueang Nonthaburi district, Nonthaburi Province. He had been receiving treatment at Thammasat Hospital and the authorities, along with forensic experts and the Poh Teck Tung Foundation, examined the scene in the restaurant's parking lot.
