= Maha Chana Chai district =

Maha Chana Chai มหาชนะชัย
- District
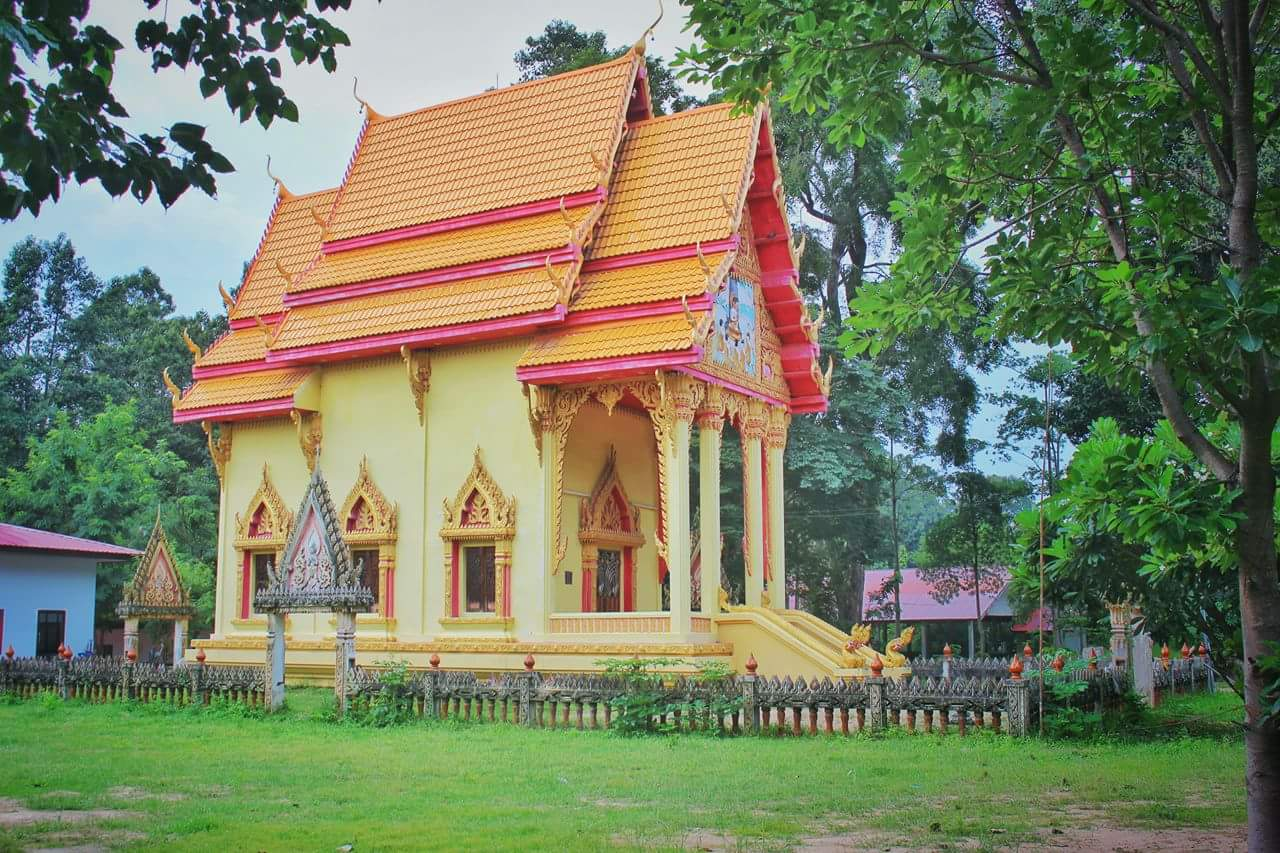
- Ordination hall of local temple Wat Tri Suwannaram

- District location in Yasothon province
- Coordinates: 15°31′57″N 104°14′33″E
- Country: Thailand
- Province: Yasothon
- Seat: Fa Yat

Area
  - Total: 455.27 km^{2} (175.78 sq mi)

Population (2005)
  - Total: 58,670
  - Density: 128.9/km^{2} (334/sq mi)
- Time zone: UTC+7 (ICT)
- Postal code: 35130
- Geocode: 3506

Maha Chana Chai (Thai: มหาชนะชัย, pronounced [mā.hǎː tɕʰā.náʔ tɕʰāj]; Northeastern Thai: มหาชนะชัย, pronounced [mā.hǎː sā.nàʔ sâj]) is a district of Yasothon province in northeastern Thailand.

== History ==
In 1859, Prince Thao Puttakhamphun (ท้าวปุตตะคำพูน ราชบุตร) founded a new city in the vicinity of the village of Woen Chai (บ้านเวินชัย) beside the Chi River, which he named Mueang (city of) Han Chai Cham Na (เมืองหันชัยชำนะ translation unknown.) In 1863, King Rama IV renamed the town Mueang Maha Chana Chai ('triumphant victory')

The town became a district (amphoe) of Ubon Ratchathani province in 1909, and on 24 April 1917 its name was changed to Fa Yat District (อำเภอฟ้าหยาด), because the district office was in Fa Yat village, Fa Yat sub-district. On 7 April 1939, the name reverted to Maha Chana Chai District.

On 1 March 1972, when Yasothon Province was established, Maha Chana Chai was one of six districts assigned to the new province.

== Geography ==
Neighboring districts are (from the north clockwise): Kham Khuean Kaeo of Yasothon Province; Khueang Nai of Ubon Ratchathani province; Kho Wang of Yasothon Province; Rasi Salai, Sila Lat of Sisaket province' and Phanom Phrai of Roi Et province.

== Administration ==
The district is divided into 10 sub-districts (tambons), with 103 villages (mubans).

1. Fa Yat (ฟ้าหยาด)
2. Hua Mueang (หัวเมือง)
3. Khu Mueang (คูเมือง)
4. Phue Hi (ผือฮี)
5. Bak Ruea (บากเรือ)
6. Muang (ม่วง)
7. Non Sai (โนนทราย)
8. Bueng Kae (บึงแก)
9. Phra Sao (พระเสาร์)
10. Song Yang (สงยาง)

== Schools ==
- Ban Huadong School (โรงเรียนบ้านหัวดง)

=== Secondary schools ===
- Maha Chana Chai Witthayakhom School (โรงเรียนมหาชนะชัยวิทยาคม)
- Trakun Prathueang Witthayakhom School (โรงเรียนตระกูลประเทืองวิทยาคม)

=== Colleges ===
- Yasothon College of Agriculture and Technology (วิทยาลัยเกษตรและเทคโนโลยียโสธร)
