= Cheesewood =

Cheesewood is a common name for several plants and may refer to:

- Alstonia scholaris (White cheesewood)
- Sphaerocoryne lefevrei (White cheesewood), often referred to by the invalid name Melodorum fruticosum, native to southeast Asia
- Pittosporum species
- Nauclea orientalis (Leichhardt tree, yellow cheesewood, Canary cheesewood)
