= Prasat Sa Kamphaeng Yai =

Khmer Buddhist temple

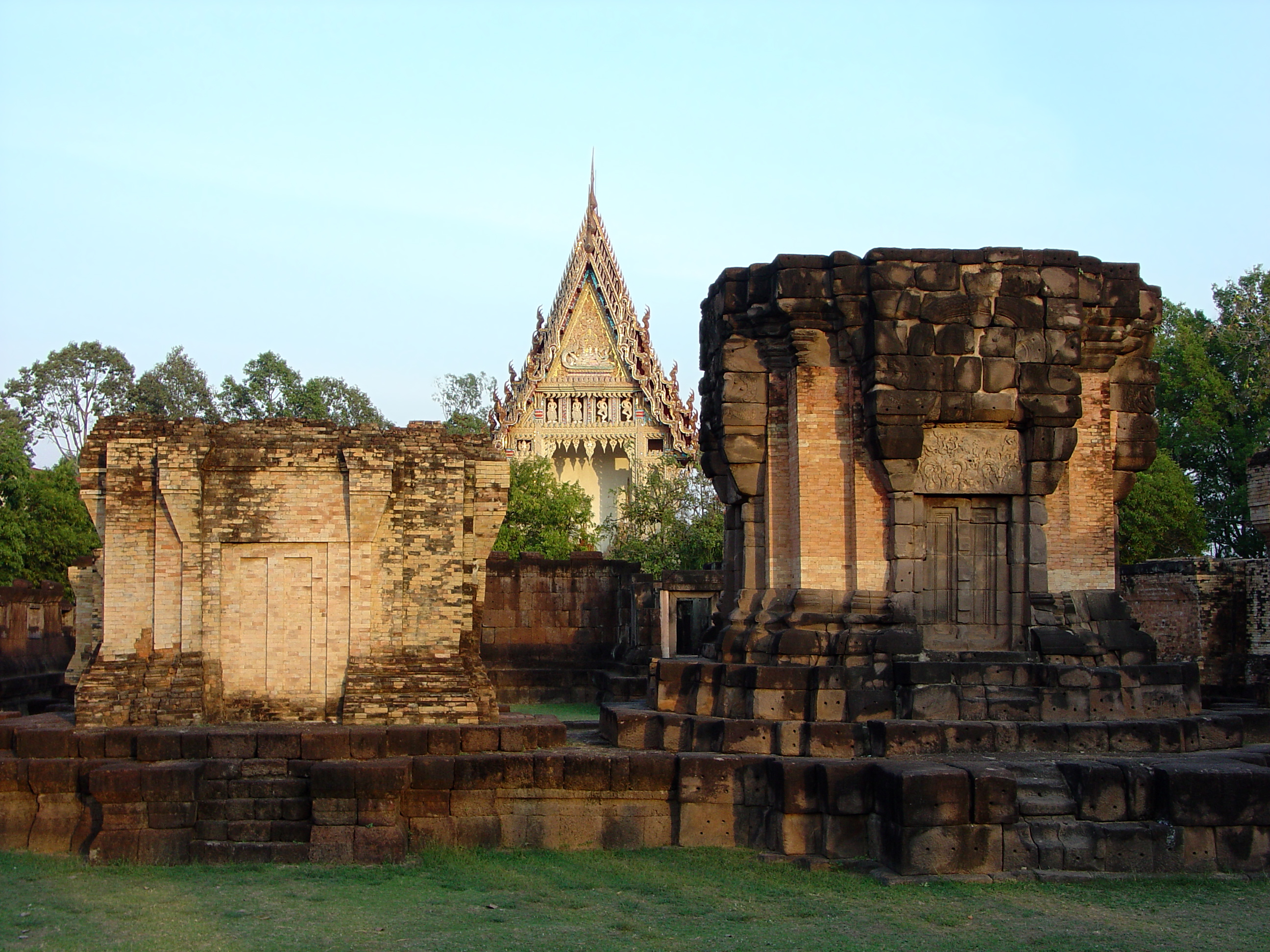

Religion
- Affiliation: Buddhism
- District: Uthumphon Phisai
- Province: Sisaket

Location
- Location: Ban Sa Kamphaeng Yai village
- Country: Thailand
- Interactive map of Prasat Sa Kamphaeng Yai
- Coordinates: 15.101°N 104.125°E

Architecture
- Creator: Udayadityavarman II
- Completed: 11th century

Prasat Sa Kamphaeng Yai is an ancient Khmer Buddhist temple in Uthumphon Phisai district, Sisaket province, Thailand. It was built in the 11th century by Udayadityavarman II in the Khmer architectural style and is the largest and best preserved Khmer temple in Sisaket province.

== Description ==
Built during the reign of Udayadityavarman II in the 11th century in the Khmer Baphuon architectural style, the temple is situated in the village of Ban Sa Kamphaeng Yai, in the grounds of Wat Sa Kamphaeng Yai, within a gallery-lined, rectangular-walled enclosure. The walls of the enclosure have been constructed using laterite bricks, and the window frames and entrances (gopura) in each wall are made of sandstone. The temple's name means "large walls".

The temple consists of six structures, the main sanctuary tower, three other towers (prasats), and two smaller sanctuaries, conventionally known as libraries. The main central tower, built of brick and sandstone, stands on a laterite and sandstone platform. The inner lintel shows Indra riding Airavata, and the pediment on the south face shows Shiva and Uma on the bull Nandi. Their costumes are in the Baphuon style of the 11th century.

In addition to the central tower are three other towers built on the same base. Of the two libraries, the lintel of the southern library shows Shiva and Uma on the bull Nandi, and the lintel of the west-facing porch of the northern library shows Krishna fighting two horses.

There are also Buddha statue in the attitude of meditation under naga, Buddha statue in pose of meditation, and terra cotta Buddha images. By the style appearing on gables, lintels, and antique, particularly inscription at the door frame of Sa Kampaeng Yai Khmer Ruins, this ruins was probably build in the 16th Buddhist Era with Bapuan Art style of Khmer.

== Discovery of artefact ==
When the temple was restored by the Fine Arts Department, a 126 cm life-size bronze figure of a young man, thought to be a guardian, was discovered. Missing only its right hand and left elbow, and dressed in the 11th-century Baphuon style, it is considered one of the finest bronze Khmer figures to have been found, and was placed in the National Museum in Bangkok. It was served as shrine for Shiva before changing into Mahayana Buddhist temple in 18th Buddhist Era.
