= Sisaket railway station =

Railway station in Thailand

Coordinates: 15.1164°N 104.3270°E

Sisaket ศรีสะเกษ
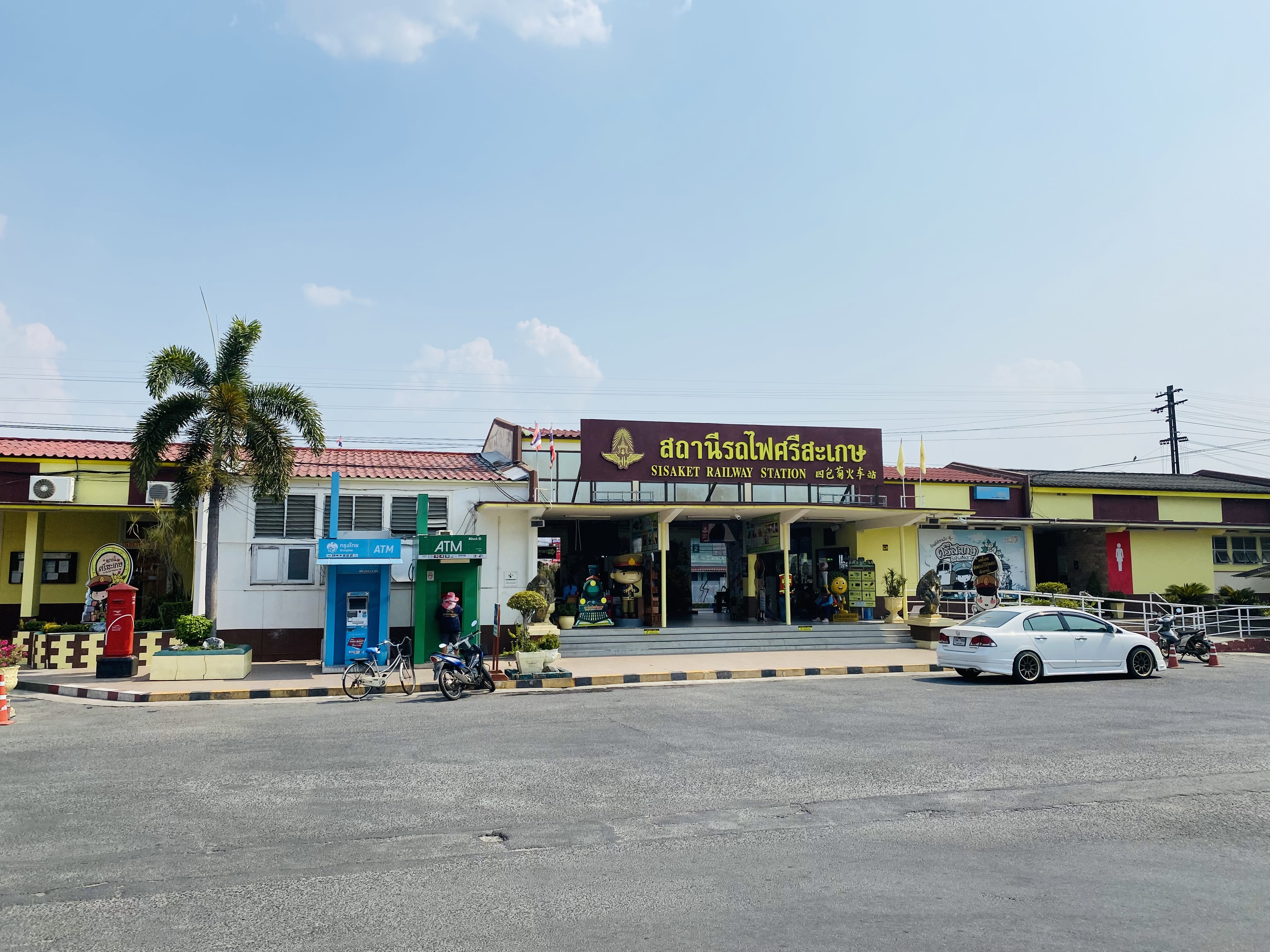
- Sisaket railway station in 2024

General information
- Location: Ratchakan Rotfai 2 Road, Mueang Nuea Subdistrict, Sisaket City
- Owner: State Railway of Thailand
- Line: Northeastern Line
- Platforms: 2
- Tracks: 3

Other information
- Station code: เก.

History
- Opened: August 1928

Services
Preceding station	State Railway of Thailand	Following station
Ban Niam towards Hua Lamphong or Krung Thep Aphiwat	Northeastern Line	Chalerm Kanchana Halt towards Ubon Ratchathani
Location

Sisaket railway station is a railway station located in Mueang Nuea Subdistrict, Sisaket City, Sisaket. It is a class 1 railway station located 515.09 km (320.1 mi) from Bangkok railway station. The station opened in August 1928 as part of the Northeastern Line Huai Thap Than-Sisaket section. The line continued to Ubon Ratchathani in April 1930.

== Train services ==
- Special Express No. 21/22 Bangkok- Ubon Ratchathani- Bangkok
- Express No. 67/68 Bangkok- Ubon Ratchathani- Bangkok
- Express No. 71/72 Bangkok- Si Sa Ket- Bangkok
- Rapid No. 135/136 Bangkok - Ubon Ratchathani- Bangkok
- Rapid No. 139/140 Bangkok- Ubon Ratchathani- Bangkok
- Rapid No. 141/142 Bangkok- Ubon Ratchathani- Bangkok
- Rapid No. 145/146 Bangkok- Ubon Ratchathani- Bangkok
- Local No. 419/420 Nakhon Ratchasima- Ubon Ratchathani- Lam Chi
- Local No. 421/422 Nakhon Ratchasima- Ubon Ratchathani- Lam Chi
- Local No.425/426 Lam Chi- Ubon Ratchathani- Nakhon Ratchasima
- Local No. 427/428 Nakhon Ratchasima- Ubon Ratchathani- Nakhon Ratchasima
