= Kleeb lamduan =

Thai flower-shaped cookie

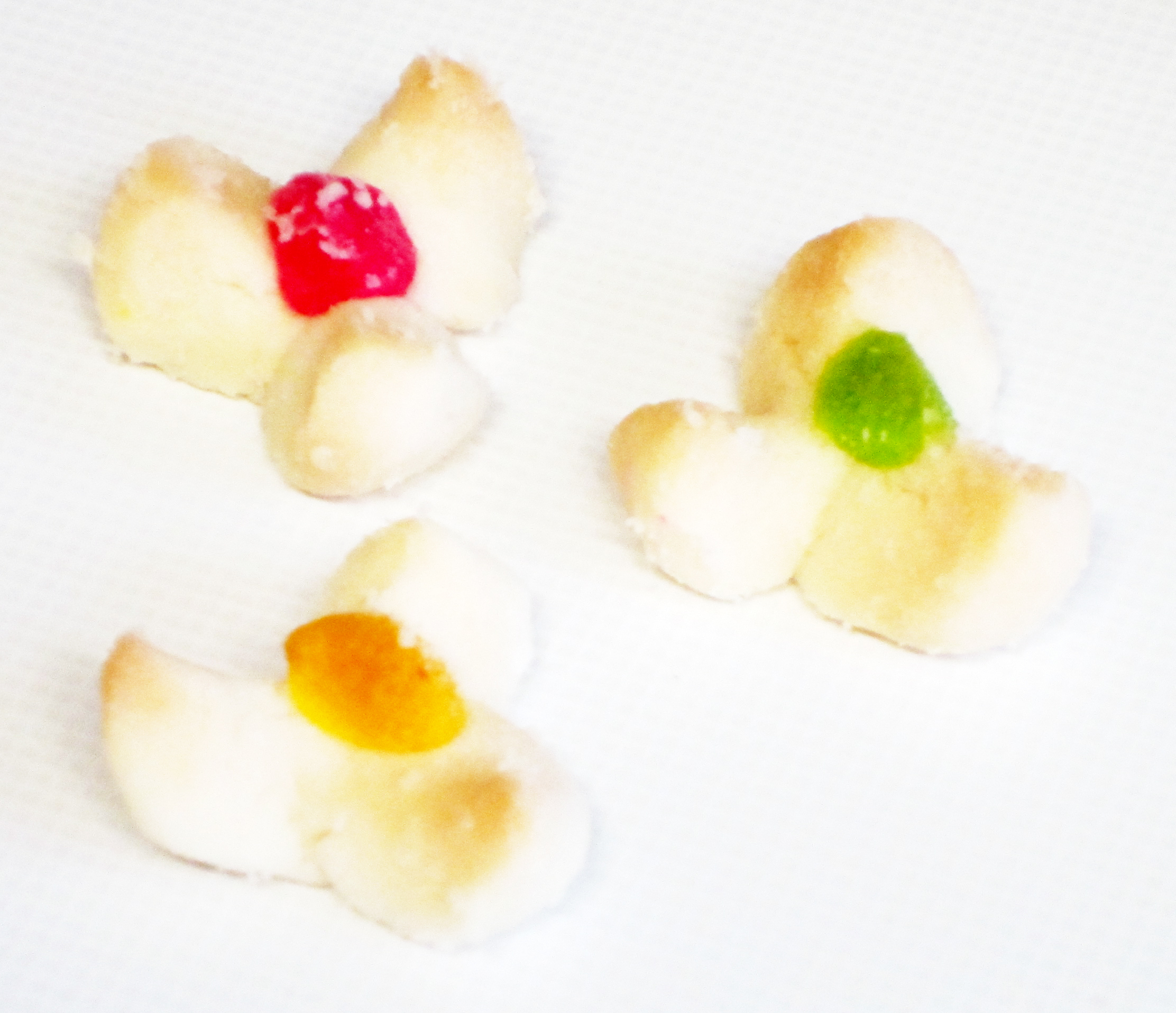
- Alternative names: lamduan flower shortbread cookie
- Type: biscuit
- Course: dessert
- Place of origin: Thailand
- Associated cuisine: Thailand
- Main ingredients: flour
- Ingredients generally used: sugar, oil

Kleeb lamduan or lamduan flower shortbread cookie (Thai: กลีบลำดวน, RTGS: klip lamduan, IPA: [klìːp lam duːan]) is a Thai biscuit in the shape of lamduan flowers. It is traditionally made from one part of white sugar, two parts of flour, and lard. Kleeb Lamduan cookies are uniquely made by placing them in a container with a tian op (เทียนอบ) scented candle used for dessert making. When the container is closed the candle is extinguished and the aromatic smoke is trapped inside. Modern recipes are also often adapted from the original by using icing sugar instead of caster sugar, vegetable oil instead of lard and some bakers add a portion of salt.

== History of kleeb lamduan ==
Kleeb lamduan was one of the auspicious authentic Thai desserts served only inside the palace. Nowadays, it is easy to find because descendants of courtiers have baked and sold the dessert for the public. As time passes, kleeb lamduan has been changed from the original recipe in terms of the baking process, the number of petals, color, or even the ingredients.

The original recipe used only flour, sugar, and lard (now vegetable oil can be used instead), similar to the ingredients of a shortbread dough.

When being made, kleeb lamduan must have six petals in total, three petals on the outside and three petals on the inside. When this process is complete, the next process is to bake it at the proper temperature and flip them regularly to create perfect cooking. Kleeb lamduan should be evenly cooked and contains crunchy texture. The final process, before served, kleeb lamduan must be smoked with a scented candle.
