= Sila Lat district =

Sila Lat ศิลาลาด
- District
- District location in Sisaket province
- Coordinates: 15°28′24″N 104°4′18″E
- Country: Thailand
- Province: Sisaket
- Seat: Kung

Area
  - Total: 131.8 km^{2} (50.9 sq mi)

Population (2005)
  - Total: 20,857
  - Density: 158.2/km^{2} (410/sq mi)
- Time zone: UTC+7 (ICT)
- Postal code: 33160
- Geocode: 3322

Sila Lat (Thai: ศิลาลาด) is a district (amphoe) in the northwestern part of Sisaket province, northeastern Thailand.

== History ==
The minor district (king amphoe) was established on 1 July 1997, when four tambons were split off from Rasi Salai district.

On 15 May 2007, all 81 minor districts were upgraded to full districts. On 24 August, the upgrade became official.

== Geography ==
Neighboring districts are (from the south clockwise): Rasi Salai of Sisaket Province; Phon Sai, Nong Hi, and Phanom Phrai of Roi Et province; and Maha Chana Chai of Yasothon province.

== Administration ==
The district is divided into four sub-districts (tambons), which are further subdivided into 44 villages (mubans). There are no municipal (thesaban) areas; there are four tambon administrative organizations (TAO).

No.	Name	Thai name	Villages	Pop.
1.	Kung	กุง	14	8,181
2.	Khli Kling	คลีกลิ้ง	11	5,439
3.	Nong Bua Dong	หนองบัวดง	9	4,530
4.	Chot Muang	โจดม่วง	10	2,707
