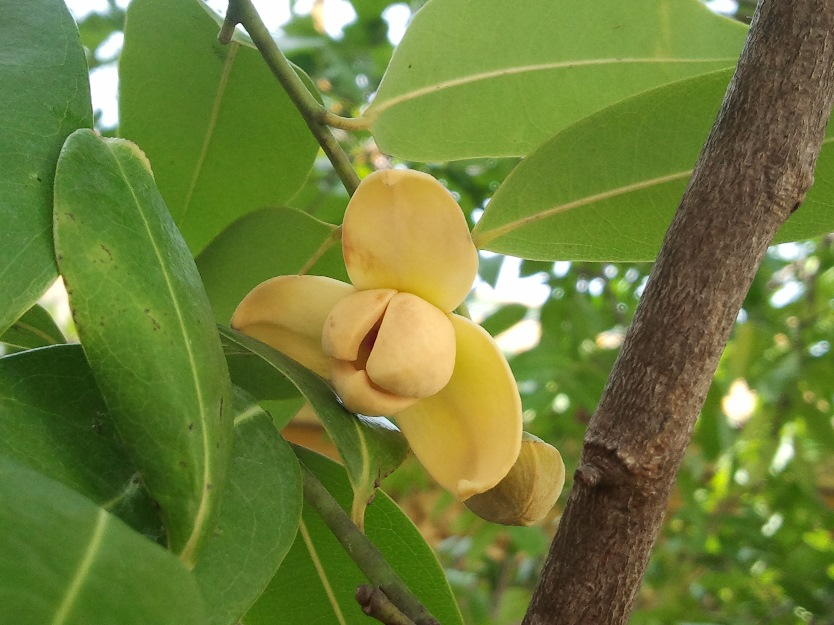
- Rumdoul

Scientific classification
- Kingdom: Plantae
- Clade: Tracheophytes
- Clade: Angiosperms
- Clade: Magnoliids
- Order: Magnoliales
- Family: Annonaceae
- Genus: Sphaerocoryne; Scheff. ex Ridl.

= Sphaerocoryne (plant) =

Genus of plants

Sphaerocoryne is a genus of flowering plants belonging to the family Annonaceae.

Its native range is Nigeria to Kenya and Southern Tropical Africa, Indo-China to Western and Central Malesia.

== Species ==
Species:

- Sphaerocoryne affinis (Teijsm. & Binn.) Ridl.
- Sphaerocoryne astiae I.M.Turner
- Sphaerocoryne blanfordiana C.E.C.Fisch.
- Sphaerocoryne diospyrifolia (Pierre ex Finet & Gagnep.) Craib
- Sphaerocoryne gracilipes (Benth.) X.Guo & R.M.K.Saunders
- Sphaerocoryne gracilis (Oliv. ex Engl. & Diels) Verdc.
- Sphaerocoryne lefevrei (Baill.) D.M.Johnson & N.A.Murray
- Sphaerocoryne touranensis (Bân) I.M.Turner
