= Rasi Salai district =

Rasi Salai ราษีไศล
- District
- District location in Sisaket province
- Coordinates: 15°20′25″N 104°9′14″E
- Country: Thailand
- Province: Sisaket
- Seat: Mueang Khong

Area
  - Total: 504.9 km^{2} (194.9 sq mi)

Population (2000)
  - Total: 82,333
  - Density: 163.1/km^{2} (422/sq mi)
- Time zone: UTC+7 (ICT)
- Postal code: 33160
- Geocode: 3309

Rasi Salai (Thai: ราษีไศล, pronounced [rāː.sǐː sā.lǎj]; Northeastern Thai: ราษีไศล, pronounced [lâː.sǐː sā.lǎj]) is a district (amphoe) in the northern part of Sisaket province, northeastern Thailand.

== Geography ==
Neighboring districts are (from the north clockwise): Phanom Phrai of Roi Et province; Sila Lat of Sisaket Province; Maha Chana Chai and Kho Wang of Yasothon province; Yang Chum Noi, Mueang Sisaket, Uthumphon Phisai, and Bueng Bun of Sisaket; and Rattanaburi of Surin province.

The main river of the district is the Mun.

== History ==
The district was renamed from Khong to Rasi Salai in 1939.

The Rasi Salai Dam was built here in 1994 and unofficially decommissioned in July 2000 following devastation of local farming villages as documented by Living River Siam.

== Administration ==
The district is divided into 13 sub-districts (tambons), which are further subdivided into 190 villages (mubans). Mueang Khong is a township (thesaban tambon) and covers parts of tambon Mueang Khong. There are a further 13 tambon administrative organizations (TAO).

No.	Name	Thai name	Villages	Pop.
1.	Mueang Khong	เมืองคง	15	7,523
2.	Mueang Khaen	เมืองแคน	14	6,600
3.	Nong Khae	หนองแค	17	7,803
6.	Chik Sang Thong	จิกสังข์ทอง	10	3,999
7.	Dan	ด่าน	13	5,206
8.	Du	ดู่	14	7,362
9.	Nong Ueng	หนองอึ่ง	17	8,594
10.	Bua Hung	บัวหุ่ง	18	6,822
11.	Phai	ไผ่	12	5,334
12.	Som Poi	ส้มป่อย	17	7,188
13.	Nong Mi	หนองหมี	18	5,937
14.	Wan Kham	หว้านคำ	13	5,142
15.	Sang Pi	สร้างปี่	12	4,823

Missing numbers are tambons which now form Sila Lat District.

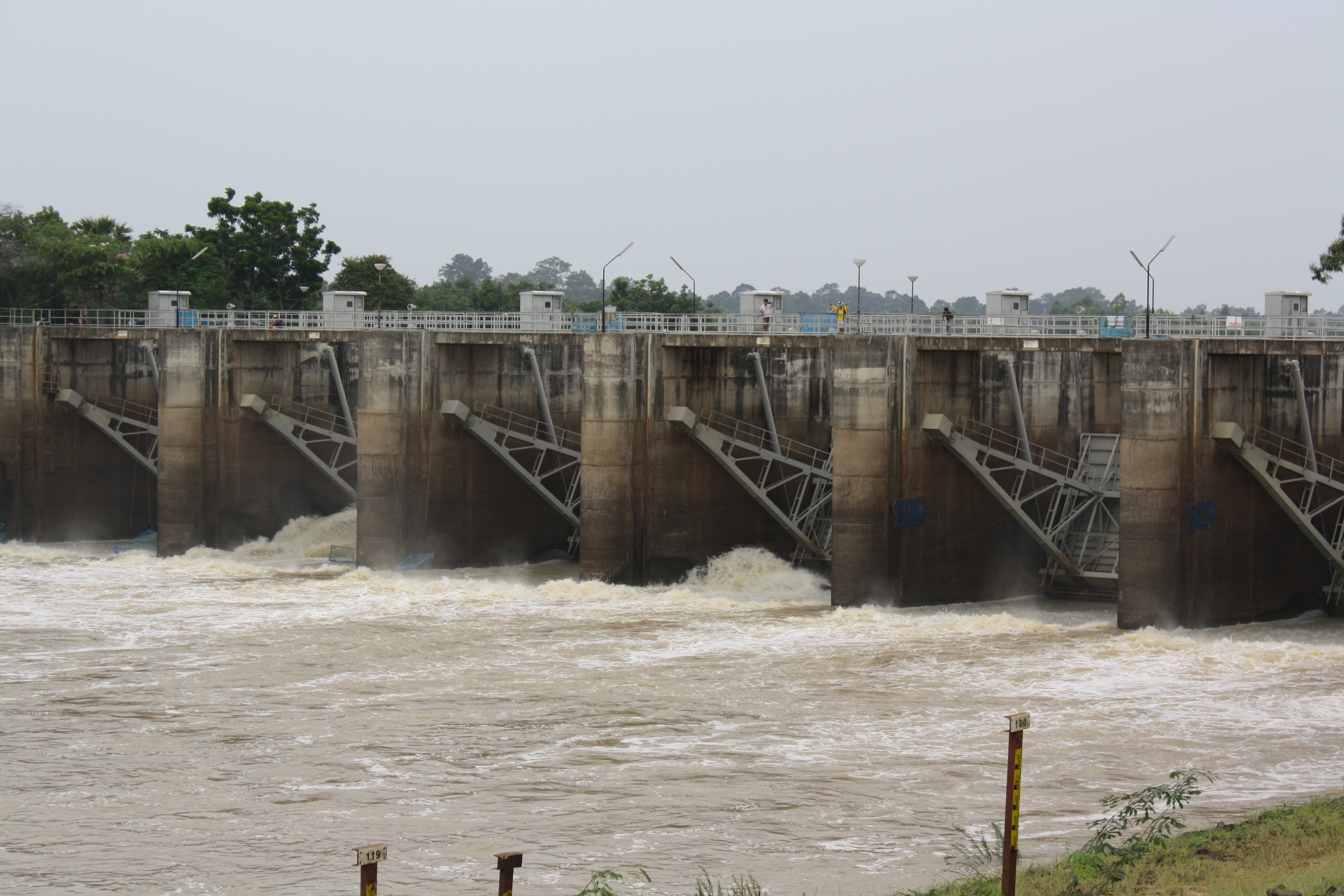
Rasi Salai Dam
