= Pho Si Suwan district =

Pho Si Suwan โพธิ์ศรีสุวรรณ
- District
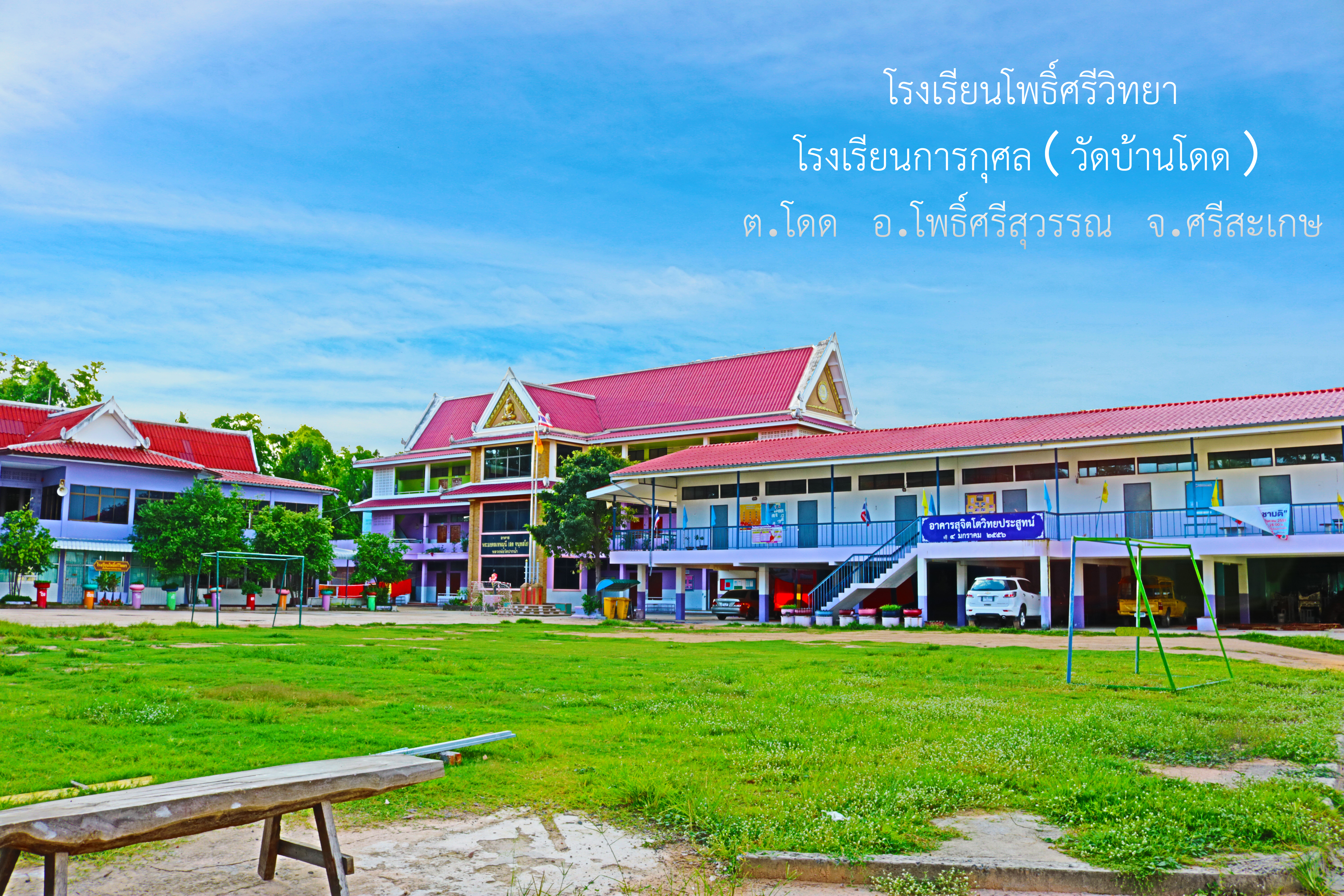
- Karnkusol Wat Bandod School, a local school

- District location in Sisaket province
- Coordinates: 15°13′54″N 104°4′36″E
- Country: Thailand
- Province: Sisaket
- Seat: Dot

Area
  - Total: 111.1 km^{2} (42.9 sq mi)

Population (2005)
  - Total: 23,519
  - Density: 211.7/km^{2} (548/sq mi)
- Time zone: UTC+7 (ICT)
- Postal code: 33120
- Geocode: 3321

Pho Si Suwan (Thai: โพธิ์ศรีสุวรรณ, pronounced [pʰōː sǐː sù.wān]) is a district (amphoe) in the northwestern part of Sisaket province, northeastern Thailand.

== History ==
The minor district (king amphoe) was established on 30 April 1994, when it was split off from Uthumphon Phisai district.

On 15 May 2007, all 81 minor districts were upgraded to full districts. On 24 August the upgrade became official.

== Geography ==
Neighboring districts are (from the north clockwise) Bueng Bun, Uthumphon Phisai, and Mueang Chan of Sisaket Province, and Rattanaburi of Surin province.

== Administration ==
The district is divided into five sub-districts (tambons), which are further subdivided into 80 villages (mubans). There are no municipal (thesaban) areas. There are five tambon administrative organizations (TAO).

No.	Name	Thai name	Villages	Pop.
1.	Dot	โดด	25	7,952
2.	Siao	เสียว	17	4,455
3.	Nong Ma	หนองม้า	12	3,519
4.	Phue Yai	ผือใหญ่	14	4,568
5.	I Se	อีเซ	12	3,025
