= Mueang Suang district =

Mueang Suang เมืองสรวง
- District
- District location in Roi Et province
- Coordinates: 15°49′25″N 103°43′4″E
- Country: Thailand
- Province: Roi Et
- Seat: Nong Phue

Area
  - Total: 209.4 km^{2} (80.8 sq mi)

Population (2005)
  - Total: 23,751
  - Density: 113.4/km^{2} (294/sq mi)
- Time zone: UTC+7 (ICT)
- Postal code: 45220
- Geocode: 4512

Mueang Suang (Thai: เมืองสรวง, pronounced [mɯ̄aŋ sǔaŋ]; Northeastern Thai: เมืองสรวง, pronounced [mɯâŋ sǔaŋ]) is a district (amphoe) of Roi Et province, in northeastern Thailand.

== Geography ==
The district is in the central part of Roi Et Province. Neighboring districts are (from the north clockwise): At Samat, Suwannaphum, Kaset Wisai, Chaturaphak Phiman, and Mueang Roi Et (at a single point).

== History ==
Suang was one of the 11 mueang or city-states subordinate to Mueang Roi Et.

The minor district (king amphoe) was created on 15 March 1973, when the three tambon, Nong Phue, Nong Hin, and Khu Mueang, were split off from Suwannaphum district. It was upgraded to a full district on 25 March 1979.

== Administration ==
The district is divided into five sub-districts (tambons), which are further subdivided into 49 villages (mubans). Mueang Suang has township (thesaban tambon) status and covers tambon Mueang Suang and parts of Nong Phue. There are a further three tambon administrative organization (TAO).

No.	Name	Thai name	Villages	Pop.
1.	Nong Phue	หนองผือ	9	4,587
2.	Nong Hin	หนองหิน	10	4,754
3.	Khu Mueang	คูเมือง	10	5,173
4.	Kok Kung	กกกุง	11	4,179
5.	Mueang Suang	เมืองสรวง	9	5,058
