= Bueng Bun district =

Bueng Bun บึงบูรพ์
- District
- District location in Sisaket province
- Coordinates: 15°19′49″N 104°2′42″E
- Country: Thailand
- Province: Sisaket
- Seat: Bueng Bun

Area
  - Total: 49.582 km^{2} (19.144 sq mi)

Population (2005)
  - Total: 10,655
  - Density: 214.9/km^{2} (557/sq mi)
- Time zone: UTC+7 (ICT)
- Postal code: 33220
- Geocode: 3311

Bueng Bun (Thai: บึงบูรพ์, pronounced [bɯ̄ŋ būːn]) is a district (amphoe) of Sisaket province, northeastern Thailand.

== History ==
The minor district (king amphoe) was created on 18 July 1977, when the four tambons, Po, Dot, Siao, and Nong Ma were split off from Uthumphon Phisai district. In 1979 all sub-districts except Po were returned to Uthumphon Phisai. The minor district was upgraded to a full district on 4 July 1994.

== Geography ==
Neighboring districts are (from the north clockwise): Rasi Salai, Uthumphon Phisai, and Pho Si Suwan of Sisaket Province, and Rattanaburi of Surin province.

== Administration ==
The district is divided into two sub-districts (tambons), which are further subdivided into 25 villages (mubans). Bueng Bun is a township (thesaban tambon) which covers parts of both tambon. There is one further tambon administrative organization (TAO).

No.	Name	Thai name	Villages	Pop.
1.	Po	เป๊าะ	16	6,207
2.	Bueng Bun	บึงบูรพ์	9	4,448
