= Suwannaphum district =

Suwannaphum สุวรรณภูมิ
- District
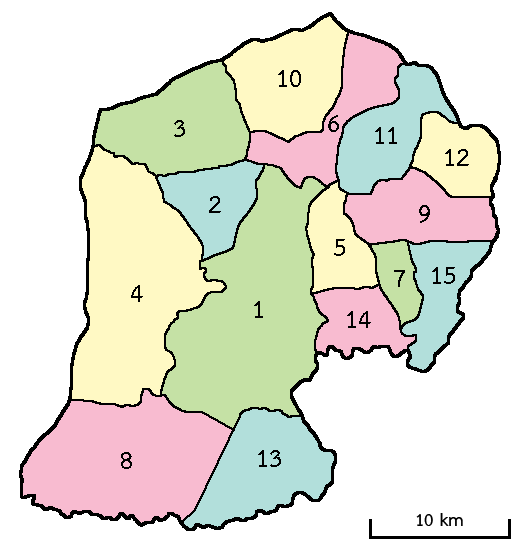
- Tambons (sub-districts) of Suwannaphum

- District location in Roi Et province
- Coordinates: 15°36′33″N 103°48′1″E
- Country: Thailand
- Province: Roi Et
- Seat: Sa Khu

Area
  - Total: 1,107.042 km^{2} (427.431 sq mi)

Population (2008)
  - Total: 116,917
  - Density: 105.6/km^{2} (274/sq mi)
- Time zone: UTC+7 (ICT)
- Postal code: 45130
- Geocode: 4511

Suwannaphum (Thai: สุวรรณภูมิ, pronounced [sù.wān.nā.pʰūːm]; Northeastern Thai: สุวรรณภูมิ, pronounced [sȕ.wân.nā.pʰûːm]) is a district (amphoe) of Roi Et province, in eastern Thailand. It is named after the legendary country of Suvarnabhumi, which according to Thai tradition was on the Chao Phraya plain. It was the seat of a small Lao mandala kingdom until the Laotian Rebellion of 1826-1829 ended vestiges of Lao independence west of the Mekong.

== History ==
In 1718, the first Lao muang in the Chi valley—and indeed anywhere in the interior of the Khorat Plateau—was founded as Suwannaphum (in latter-day Roi Et Province) by an official in the service of King Nokasad of the Kingdom of Champasak, leading some 3,000 subjects.

== Geography ==
The district is in southern Roi Et Province. Neighboring districts are (from the west clockwise): Kaset Wisai, Mueang Suang, At Samat, Phanom Phrai, Nong Hi, and Moei Wadi of Roi Et Province, and Rattanaburi and Tha Tum of Surin province.

== Administration ==
The district is divided into 15 sub-districts (tambons), which are further subdivided into 195 villages (mubans). Suwannaphum itself has township (thesaban tambon) status and covers part of tambon Sa Khu. Each of the tambons is administered by a tambon administrative organization.

| No. | Name | Thai | Villages | Pop. |
|---|---|---|---|---|
| 1. | Sa Khu | สระคู | 21 | 20,956 |
| 2. | Dok Mai | ดอกไม้ | 14 | 6,105 |
| 3. | Na Yai | นาใหญ่ | 15 | 8,073 |
| 4. | Hin Kong | หินกอง | 16 | 9,319 |
| 5. | Mueang Thung | เมืองทุ่ง | 8 | 5,118 |
| 6. | Hua Thon | หัวโทน | 12 | 5,396 |
| 7. | Bo Phan Khan | บ่อพันขัน | 9 | 4,540 |
| 8. | Thung Luang | ทุ่งหลวง | 14 | 7,965 |
| 9. | Hua Chang | หัวช้าง | 12 | 6,299 |
| 10. | Nam Kham | น้ำคำ | 15 | 9,610 |
| 11. | Huai Hin Lat | ห้วยหินลาด | 12 | 5,473 |
| 12. | Chang Phueak | ช้างเผือก | 11 | 6,942 |
| 13. | Thung Kula | ทุ่งกุลา | 13 | 7,080 |
| 14. | Thung Si Mueang | ทุ่งศรีเมือง | 11 | 7,310 |
| 15. | Champa Khan | จำปาขัน | 12 | 6,731 |
