= Sphaerocoryne affinis =

Scientific classification
- Kingdom: Plantae
- Clade: Tracheophytes
- Clade: Angiosperms
- Clade: Magnoliids
- Order: Magnoliales
- Family: Annonaceae
- Genus: Sphaerocoryne
- Species: S. affinis

Binomial name
- Sphaerocoryne affinis (Teijsm. & Binn.) Ridl.

Synonyms
- List: Polyalthia affinis Teijsm. & Binn.; Dasymaschalon scandens Merr.; Melodorum aberrans (Maingay ex Hook.f. & Thomson) J.Sinclair; Mitrella aberrans (Maingay ex Hook.f. & Thomson) Bân; Mitrella mesnyi Bân; Monoon submitratum Miq.; Polyalthia aberrans Maingay ex Hook.f. & Thomson; Polyalthia submitrata (Miq.) Ridl.; Popowia aberrans (Maingay ex Hook.f. & Thomson) Pierre ex Finet & Gagnep.; Sphaerocoryne aberrans (Maingay ex Hook.f. & Thomson) Ridl.; Unona mesnyi Pierre

Species of flowering plants

Sphaerocoryne affinis is a species of flowering plant in the soursop family, Annonaceae.

It is a liana (woody climbing plant) growing in lowland wet tropical forests at an elevation of up to 200 metres (660 ft). It is distributed within west and central Malesia, and occurs at one locality in Southern Thailand, on Tarutao Island.

Sphaerocoryne affinis is similar in appearance to S. lefevrei (a species with cultural significance in Cambodia and Thailand, where it is known as rumduol and lamduan, respectively), and some sources treat them as the same species. In Cambodia, the rumdoul has been referred to by the scientific name Mitrella mesnyi, which most authorities regard as an illegitimate synonym of S. affinis, though this species does not occur in the country.
