= Phanom Phrai district =

Phanom Phrai พนมไพร
- District
- District location in Roi Et province
- Coordinates: 15°40′42″N 104°6′36″E
- Country: Thailand
- Province: Roi Et

Area
  - Total: 519.3 km^{2} (200.5 sq mi)

Population (2005)
  - Total: 75,140
  - Density: 144.7/km^{2} (375/sq mi)
- Time zone: UTC+7 (ICT)
- Postal code: 45140
- Geocode: 4506

Phanom Phrai (Thai: พนมไพร, pronounced [pʰā.nōm pʰrāj]; Northeastern Thai: พนมไพร, pronounced [pʰā.nôm pʰâj]) is a district (amphoe) in the southeastern part of Roi Et province, northeastern Thailand.

== Geography ==
Neighboring districts are (from the southwest clockwise): Nong Hi, Suwannaphum, At Samat, Selaphum of Roi Et Province; Mueang Yasothon, Kham Khuean Kaeo, Maha Chana Chai of Yasothon province; and Sila Lat of Sisaket province.

== Administration ==
The district is divided into 13 sub-districts (tambons), which are further subdivided into 160 villages (mubans). Phanom Phrai is a township (thesaban tambon) which covers parts of tambon Phanom Phrai. There are a further 13 tambon administrative organizations (TAO).

| No. | Name | Thai name | Villages | Pop. |
|---|---|---|---|---|
| 1. | Phanom Phrai | พนมไพร | 19 | 11,295 |
| 2. | Saen Suk | แสนสุข | 18 | 8,714 |
| 3. | Kut Nam Sai | กุดน้ำใส | 10 | 3,859 |
| 4. | Nong Thap Thai | หนองทัพไทย | 14 | 7,284 |
| 5. | Pho Yai | โพธิ์ใหญ่ | 14 | 7,046 |
| 6. | Wari Sawat | วารีสวัสดิ์ | 11 | 4,516 |
| 7. | Khok Sawang | โคกสว่าง | 16 | 5,030 |
| 11. | Pho Chai | โพธิ์ชัย | 12 | 7,195 |
| 12. | Na Nuan | นานวล | 13 | 4,759 |
| 13. | Kham Hai | คำไฮ | 10 | 5,574 |
| 14. | Sa Kaeo | สระแก้ว | 9 | 3,677 |
| 15. | Kho Yai | ค้อใหญ่ | 7 | 2,288 |
| 17. | Chanuwan | ชานุวรรณ | 7 | 3,903 |

Missing numbers are tambons which now form Nong Hi District.
