= Uthumphon Phisai district =

Uthumphon Phisai อุทุมพรพิสัย
- District
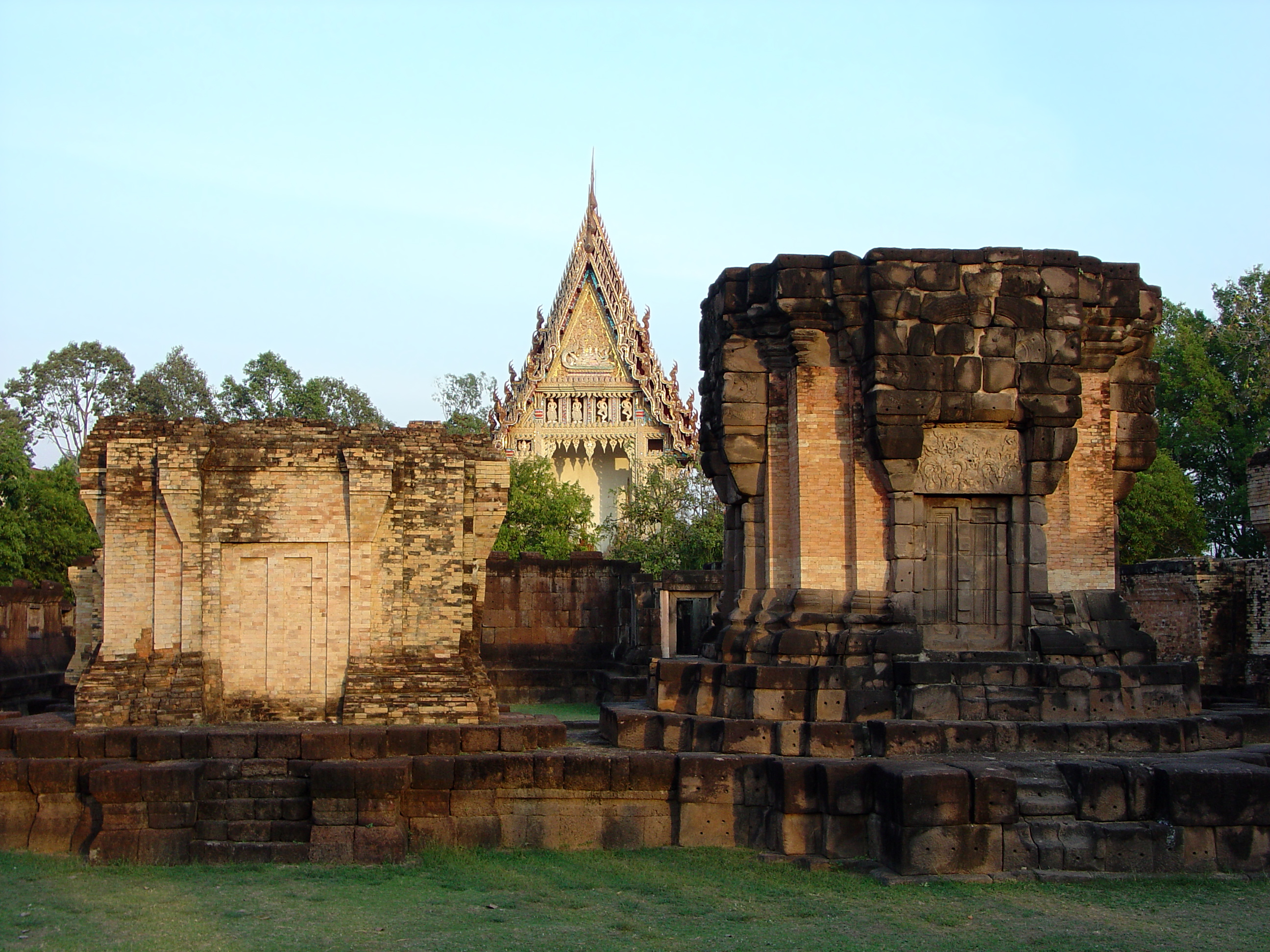
- Prasat Sa Kamphaeng Yai

- District location in Sisaket province
- Coordinates: 15°6′42″N 104°8′24″E
- Country: Thailand
- Province: Sisaket
- Seat: Kamphaeng

Area
  - Total: 407.9 km^{2} (157.5 sq mi)

Population (2005)
  - Total: 109,618
  - Density: 268.7/km^{2} (696/sq mi)
- Time zone: UTC+7 (ICT)
- Postal code: 33120
- Geocode: 3310

Uthumphon Phisai (Thai: อุทุมพรพิสัย, pronounced [ʔù.tʰūm.pʰɔ̄ːn pʰí.sǎj]; Northeastern Thai: อุทุมพรพิสัย, pronounced [ʔǔ.tʰûm.pʰɔ̂ːn pʰì.sǎj]) is a district (amphoe) in the western part of Sisaket province, lower northeastern Thailand.

== Geography ==
Neighboring districts are (from the north clockwise): Rasi Salai, Mueang Sisaket, Wang Hin, Prang Ku, Huai Thap Than, Mueang Chan, Pho Si Suwan, and Bueng Bun.

== History ==
The district dates back to Mueang Uthumphon Phisai, which was converted into a district in 1911, then named Phachim Sisaket (ปจิมศีร์ษะเกษ). In 1913 it was renamed Uthomphon Phisai again. The district office was in Ban Samrong Yai, tambon Samrong.

== Administration ==
The district is divided into 19 sub-districts (tambons), which are further subdivided into 232 villages (mubans). Kamphaeng is a township (thesaban tambon) which covers parts of tambon Kamphaeng. There are a further 19 tambon administrative organizations (TAO).

No.	Name	Thai name	Villages	Pop.
1.	Kamphaeng	กำแพง	9	9,787
2.	I Lam	อี่หล่ำ	12	4,343
3.	Kan Lueang	ก้านเหลือง	20	9,287
4.	Thung Chai	ทุ่งไชย	9	4,579
5.	Samrong	สำโรง	17	7,851
6.	Khaem	แขม	12	4,424
7.	Nong Hai	หนองไฮ	12	5,320
8.	Khayung	ขะยูง	13	5,425
10.	Ta Ket	ตาเกษ	12	4,025
11.	Hua Chang	หัวช้าง	11	4,590
12.	Rang Raeng	รังแร้ง	12	5,391
14.	Tae	แต้	8	2,853
15.	Khae	แข้	9	4,855
16.	Pho Chai	โพธิ์ชัย	11	4,888
17.	Pa Ao	ปะอาว	14	5,194
18.	Nong Hang	หนองห้าง	17	8,808
22.	Sa Kamphaeng Yai	สระกำแพงใหญ่	14	8,875
24.	Khok Lam	โคกหล่าม	10	3,720
25.	Khok Chan	โคกจาน	10	5,403

Missing numbers are tambons which now form the districts Mueang Chan and Pho Si Suwan.

== Places ==
Uthumphon Phisai is the home of Prasat Sa Kamphaeng Yai, the biggest Khmer-styled Hindu temple in the province.

Wat Pa Si Mongkhon Rattanaram is a Thai Buddhist temple in Theravāda sect. This temple is famous for its beautiful and fantasy Nāga cave and a white Buddha statue enshrined within.

Since January 2019 onwards every Friday evening, locals will join to close the road in Kamphaeng to make a cultural pedestrian street named Talat Ban Kao Hao Tamyae. Considered as a local flea market that collects various interesting products and many food.

== Notable people ==
- Srisaket Sor Rungvisai: two times WBC super flyweight world champion

== Local food ==
- Kai yang mai madan: a Thai grilled chicken that uses madan (มะดัน, Garcinia schomburgkiana) skewers while grilling causing the chicken to have a sour smell from grilled wood, therefore makes it different from grilled chicken in other places. Its origin is in neighboring district Huai Thap Than. Hence the name Kai yang Huai Thap Than in other way.
- Cricket ho mok
- Frog ho mok
- Khao chi: sticky rice, roll it into an oval and put on the hot charcoal fire along with brushing with eggs.
