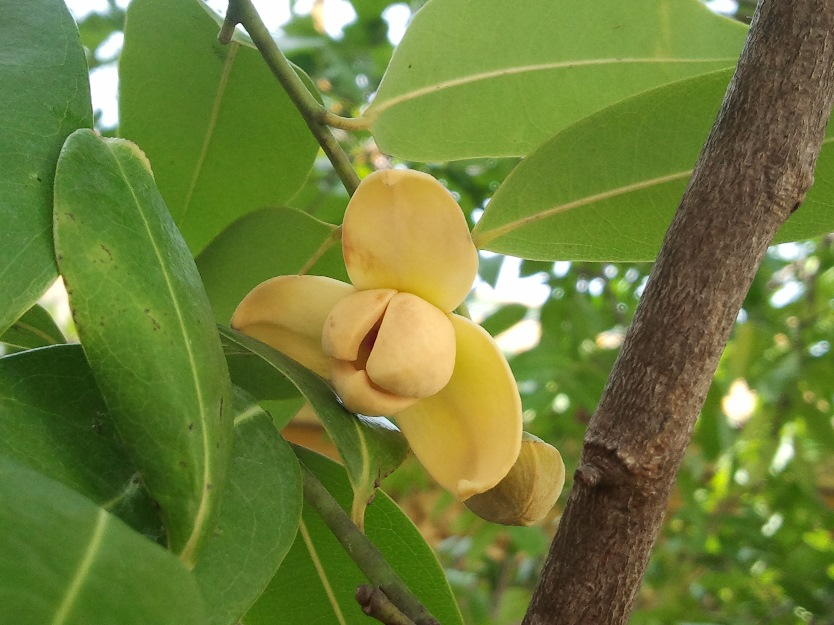
- Flower in Cambodia

Scientific classification
- Kingdom: Plantae
- Clade: Tracheophytes
- Clade: Angiosperms
- Clade: Magnoliids
- Order: Magnoliales
- Family: Annonaceae
- Genus: Sphaerocoryne
- Species: S. lefevrei

Binomial name
- Sphaerocoryne lefevrei (Baill.) D.M.Johnson & N.A.Murray

Synonyms
- Synonymy: Melodorum lefevrei Baill.; Melodorum clavipes Hance; Polyalthia siamensis Boerl.; Popowia mesnyi Craib; Sphaerocoryne clavipes (Hance) Craib; Sphaerocoryne siamensis (Boerl.) Scheff. ex Ridl.

= Sphaerocoryne lefevrei =

Species of tree

Sphaerocoryne lefevrei, known in Khmer as rumduol (រំដួល [rum.ɗuəl]) and in Thai as lamduan (ลำดวน), is a flowering plant of the Annonaceae family, native to Southeast Asia. It is commonly cultivated as an ornamental plant, and is the national flower of Cambodia and the provincial flower of Thailand's Sisaket province. Some sources treat it as the same species as the similar S. affinis.

== Description and distribution ==
S. lefevrei is a shrub or small tree growing up to 8 metres (26 ft) in height. It bears cream-coloured, yellow or yellow-brown flowers with three outer and three inner petals, the latter of which close in over the centre of the flower.

The species occurs naturally in mixed deciduous forests at elevations of 50 to 510 metres (160–1,670 ft). It is distributed in Thailand's northeast, central and eastern regions, as well as in Laos, Cambodia and Vietnam.

== Taxonomy ==
The lamduan was for a long time known in Thailand by the scientific name Melodorum fruticosum, but the name was later identified as a synonym of Uvaria siamensis, a similar but different plant known in Thai as nom maew.

Some sources treat S. lefevrei as the same species as the similar S. affinis, a climbing species distributed in maritime Southeast Asia. In Cambodia, the rumduol has been referred to by the scientific name Mitrella mesnyi, which most authorities report as an illegitimate synonym of S. affinis. However, this species' range does not cover Cambodia.

== Cultivation and culture ==
The tree is widely cultivated as an ornamental plant in Cambodia and Thailand, and its flowers are admired for their pleasant fragrance, which is emitted especially in the evening. The fruit is edible when ripe, and is collected from the forest for consumption. The dried flowers are used in traditional medicine to relieve fainting/dizziness and as a mild stimulant. In ancient times, the flowers were used by Khmer people as a scent ingredient for lip waxes.

The rumduol/lamduan's distinctive flowers are commonly evoked as a symbol, and have long been used as a metaphor for women's beauty in Khmer and Thai literature. The traditional Thai snack klip lamduan is a shortbread cookie made in the shape of the flower.

The rumduol was declared the national flower of Cambodia in 2005.

The lamduan flower also features as an important symbol in the Thai province of Sisaket, as ancient inscriptions attribute the name Dong Lamduan ('lamduan forest') to the surrounding area on the Thai–Cambodian border, a region exhibiting significant Northern Khmer heritage. It is regarded as the provincial tree, the provincial flower, and is featured on the provincial seal and in its official slogan.

== Gallery ==
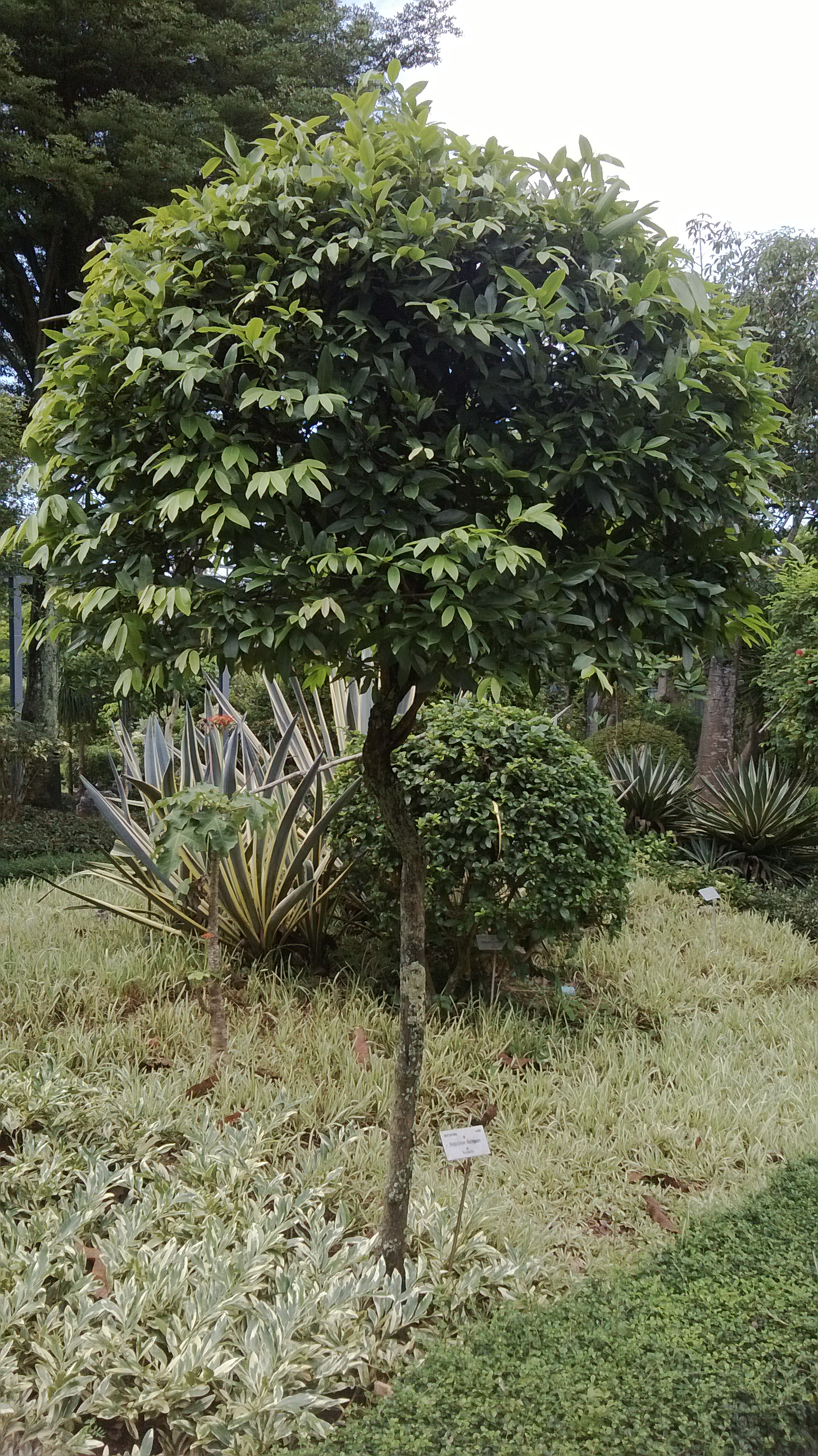
Tree at Nong Nooch Tropical Garden, Thailand

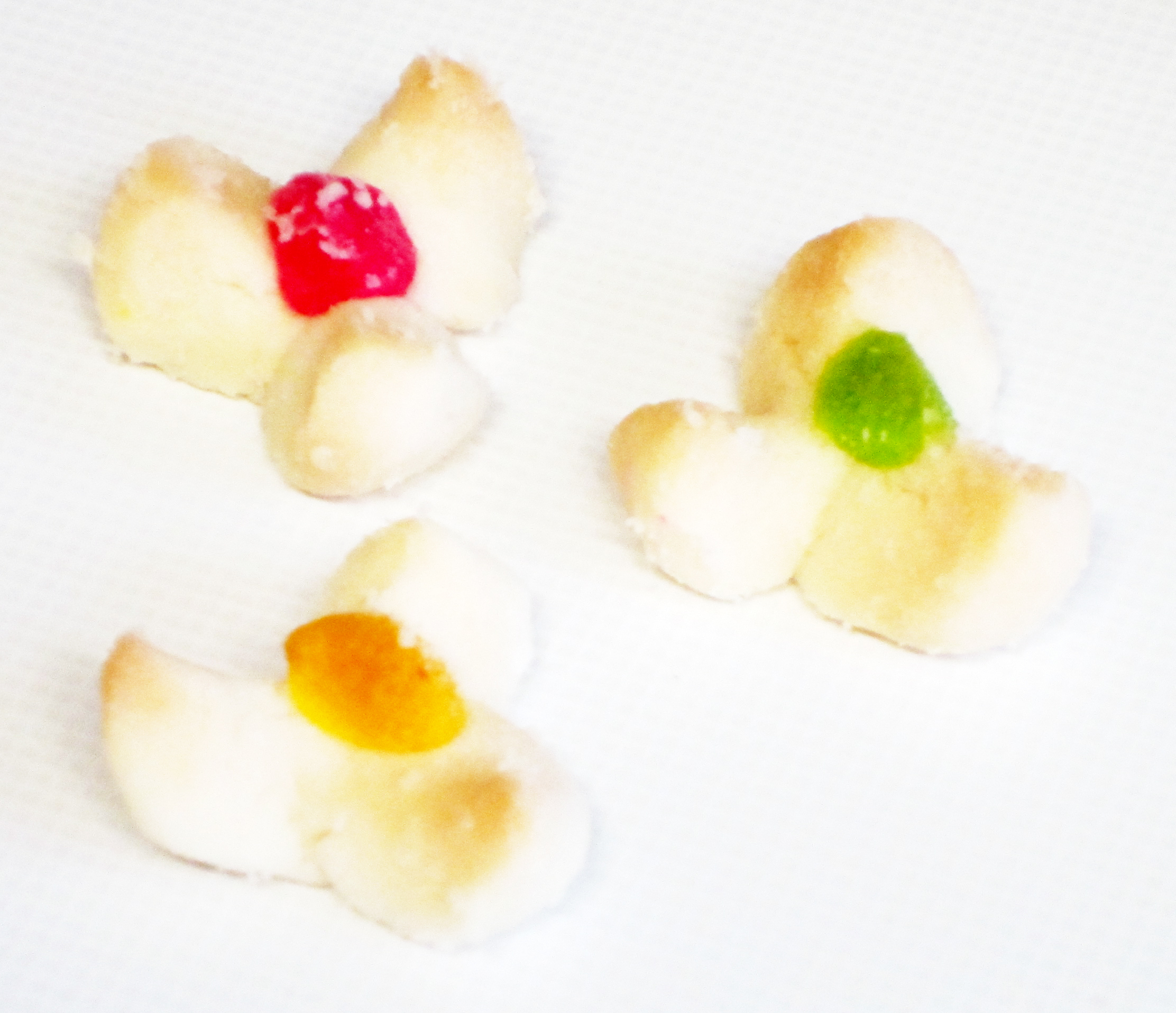
Thai klip lamduan cookies
