= Sisaket province =

Province of Thailand

Coordinates: 15°7′12″N 104°19′18″E

Sisaket ศรีสะเกษ (Thai) ซีซะเกด (Northern Khmer)
- Province
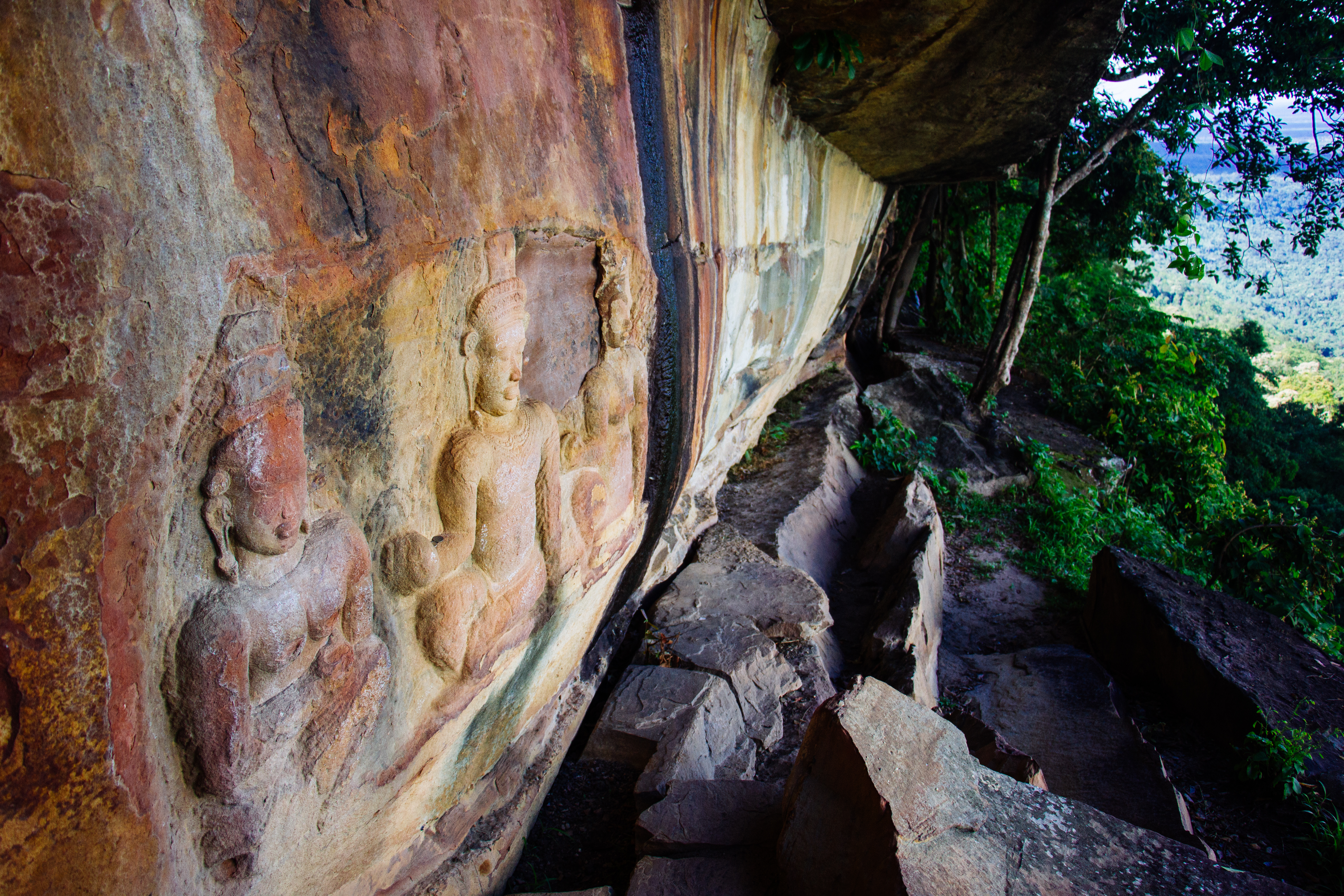
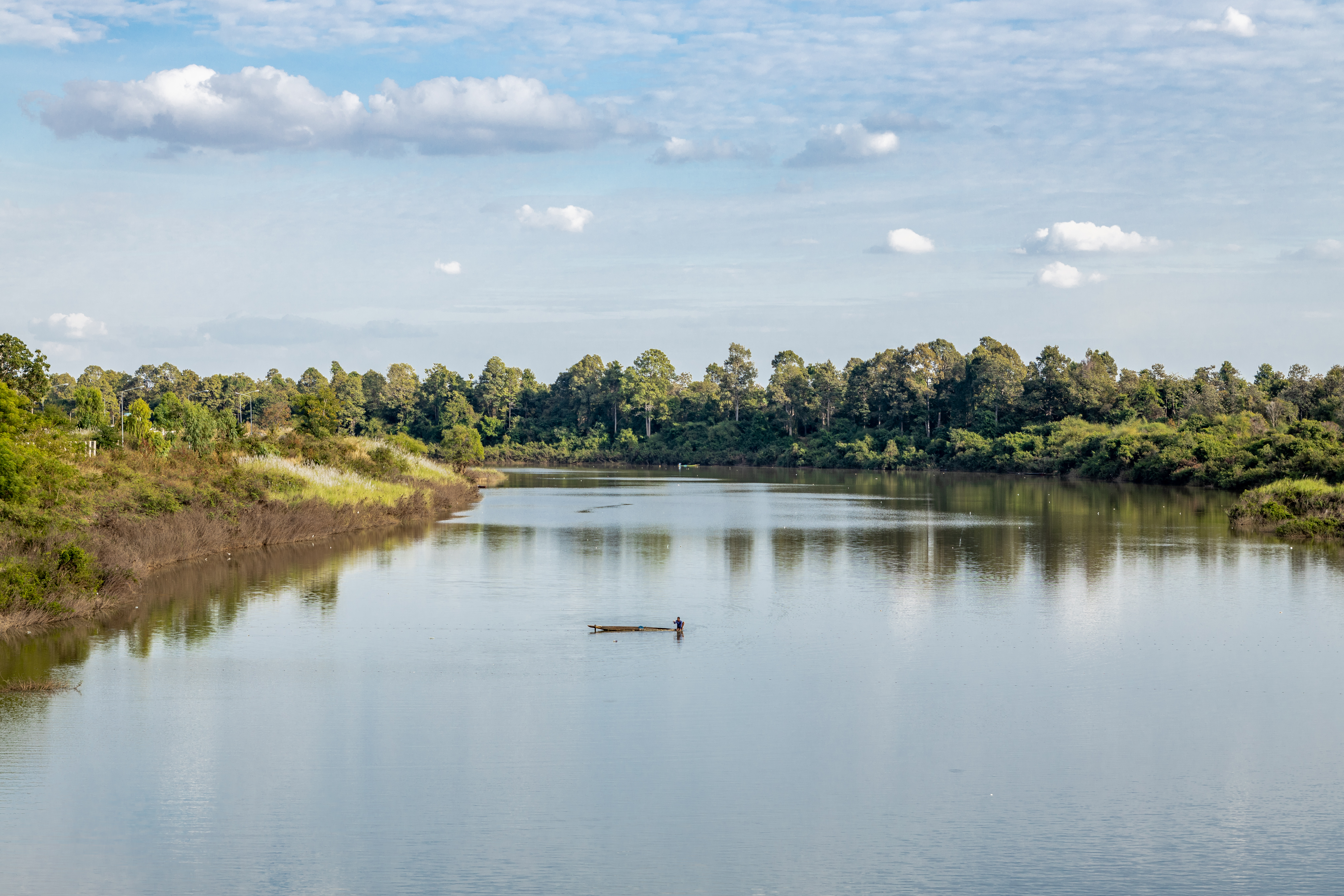
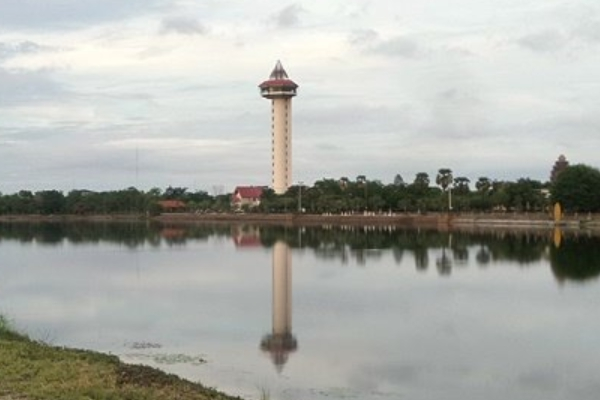
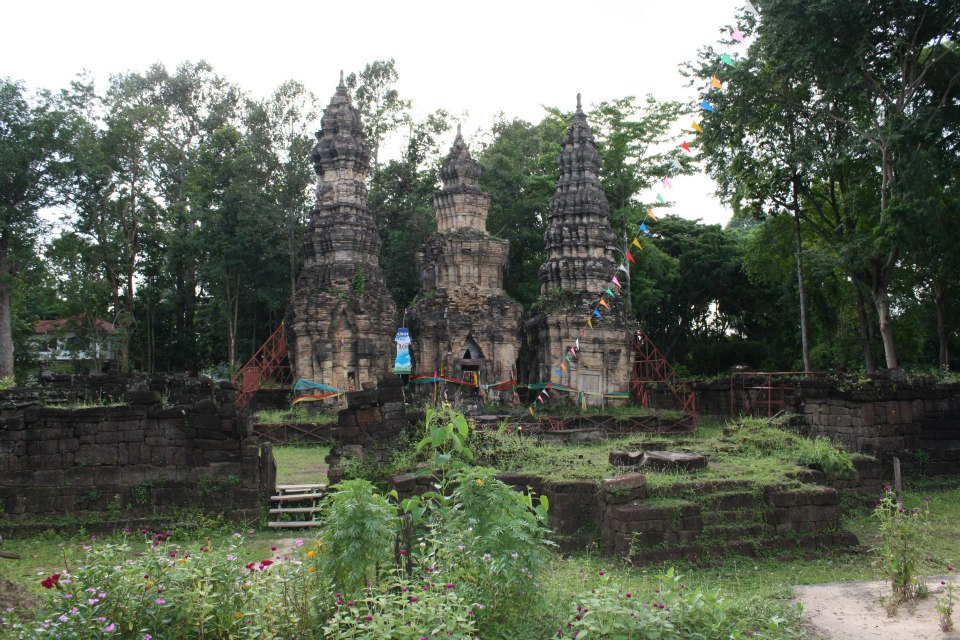
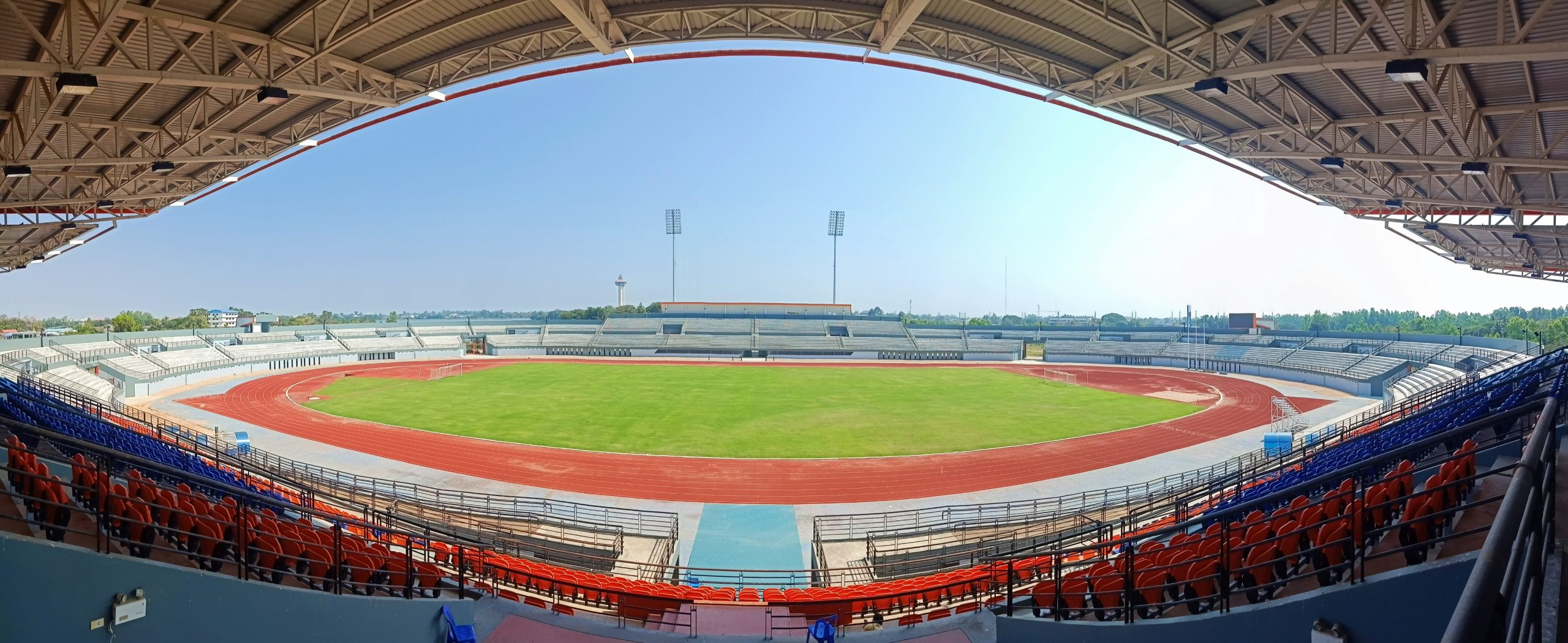
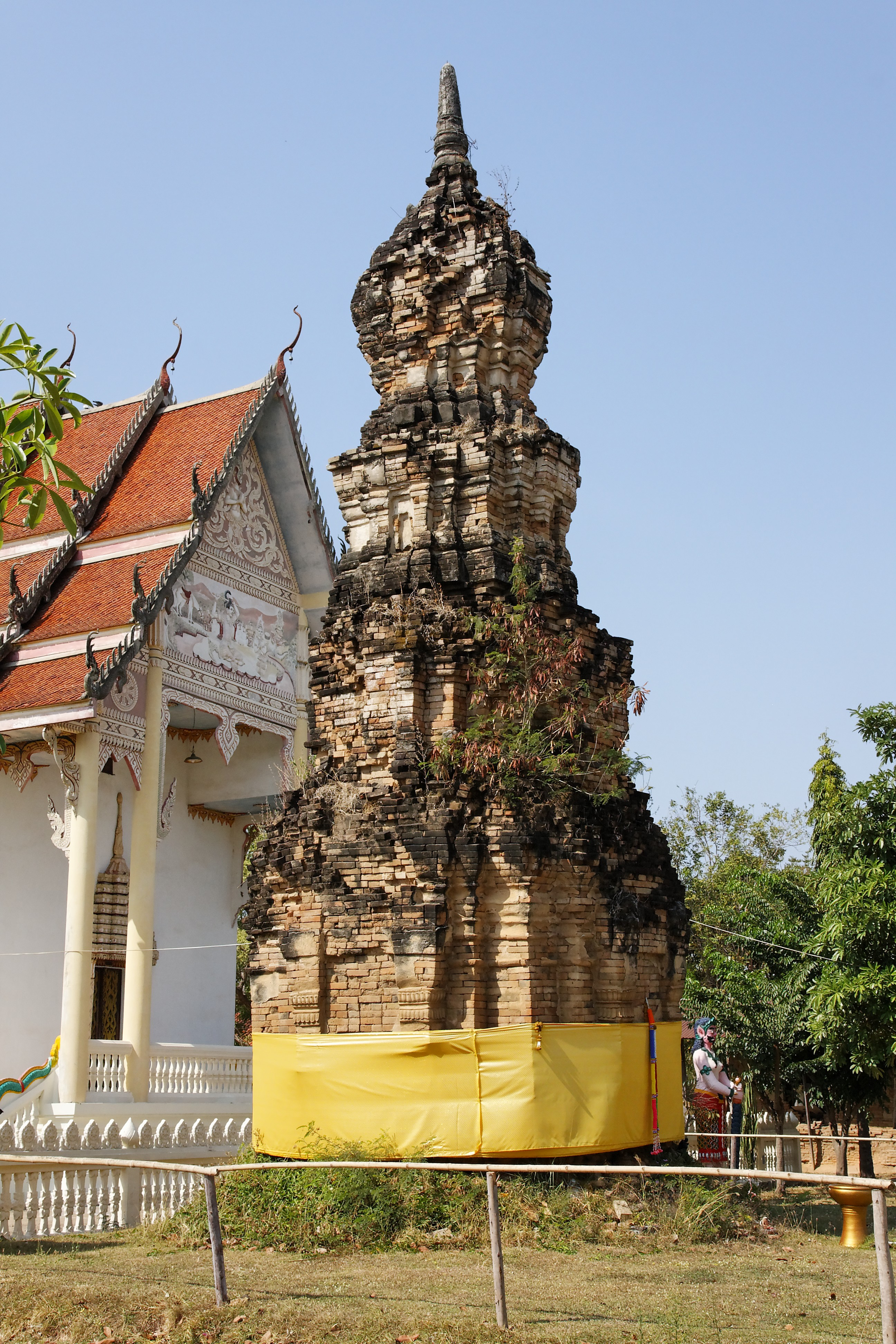
- From top: Khao Phra Wihan National Park, Mun River in Rasi Salai District, Si Saket Tower, Prasat Huai Thap Than, Sri Nakhon Lamduan Stadium, Prang Ku

- Flag Seal
- Nickname: Si Nakorn Lamduan (honour of lamduan city)
- Mottoes: หลวงพ่อโตคู่บ้าน ถิ่นฐานปราสาทขอม ข้าว หอม กระเทียมดี มีสวนสมเด็จ เขตดงลำดวน หลากล้วนวัฒนธรรม เลิศล้ำสามัคคี ("Home of Luang Pho To. Lands of the Khmer castles. Good rice, shallots, garlic. Suan Somdet. The areas of the Lamduan flower. Plenty of culture. Amazing unity.")
- Map of Thailand highlighting Sisaket province
- Country: Thailand
- Capital: Sisaket

Government
  - Governor: Anurat Thamprajumjit (since 2025)

Area
  - Total: 8,936 km^{2} (3,450 sq mi)
  - Rank: 21st

Population (2024)
  - Total: ▼1,442,013
  - Rank: 10th
  - Density: 161/km^{2} (420/sq mi)
  - Rank: 22nd

Human Achievement Index
  - HAI (2022): 0.6137 "low" Ranked 71st

GDP
  - Total: baht 70 billion (US$2.3 billion) (2019)
- Time zone: UTC+7 (ICT)
- Postal code: 33xxx
- Calling code: 045
- ISO 3166 code: TH-33
- Website: sisaket.go.th

Sisaket Provincial Administrative Organization องค์การบริหารส่วนจังหวัดศรีสะเกษ
- Provincial Administrative Organization
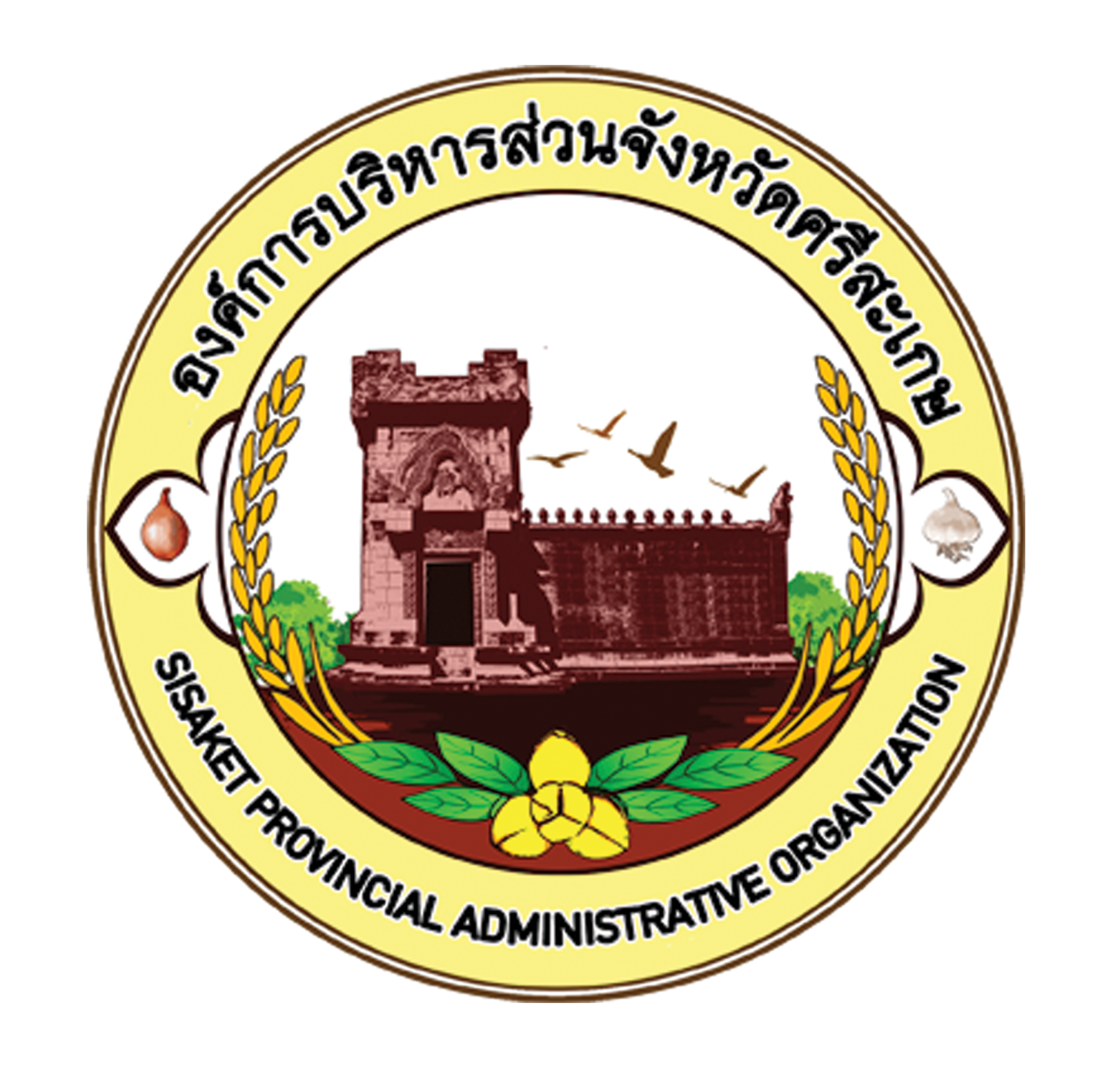
- Seal
- Interactive map of Sisaket Provincial Administrative Organization

Government
  - Type: Local administrative divisions
  - Body: Sisaket Provincial Administrative Organization
  - President: Wichit Traisanakul
- Website: pao-sisaket.go.th

Sisaket province (Thai: ศรีสะเกษ, RTGS: Si Sa Ket, pronounced [sǐː sàʔ kèːt]; Northern Khmer: ซีซะเกด) is one of Thailand's seventy-six provinces (changwat). It lies in lower northeastern Thailand, a region called Isan. Neighboring provinces are (from west clockwise): Surin, Roi Et, Yasothon, and Ubon Ratchathani. To the south it borders Oddar Meancheay and Preah Vihear of Cambodia.

== Geography ==
The province is in the valley of the Mun River, a tributary of the Mekong. The Dângrêk mountain chain, which forms the border with Cambodia, is in the south of the province. The total forest area is 1,025 km^{2} (396 sq mi) or 11.5 percent of provincial area. Khao Phra Wihan National Park covers an area of 130 km^{2} of the Dângrêk mountains in the southeast of the province. Established on 20 March 1998, it is named after the Khmer Empire temple Preah Vihear (anglicised in Thailand as Phra Wihan), now in Cambodia, which has been the subject of a border dispute. The temple faces north and was built in dedication to the Hindu god Shiva.

Access to the temple is still principally from the Thai side, as the ruins are difficult to reach from the Cambodian plains at the bottom of a sheer cliff several hundred meters below.

=== National park ===
There is one national park, along with five other national parks, make up region 9 (Ubon Ratchathani) of Thailand's protected areas.

- Khao Phra Wihan National Park, 130 km^{2} (50 sq mi)

=== Wildlife sanctuaries ===
There are two wildlife sanctuaries, along with four other wildlife sanctuaries, make up region 9 (Ubon Ratchathani) of Thailand's protected areas.

- Huai Sala Wildlife Sanctuary, 380 km^{2} (150 sq mi)
- Phanom Dong Rak Wildlife Sanctuary, 316 km^{2} (122 sq mi)

== History ==
The many Khmer ruins found in the province show the area must have been important to the Khmer Empire at least by the 12th century, although it was apparently sparsely populated. According to local tradition, it was known as Sri Nakorn Lamduan (ศรีนครลำดวน.) It was later called Khukhan, after a town built in the late-15th century CE during the reign of King Boromaratcha III of Ayutthaya. Ethnic Laos began settling the northern portion of the province, and in 1786 the town Sisaket was formed, subject to Khukhan. In 1904, Sisaket was renamed Khukhan, while the original Khukhan was designated Huai Nua.

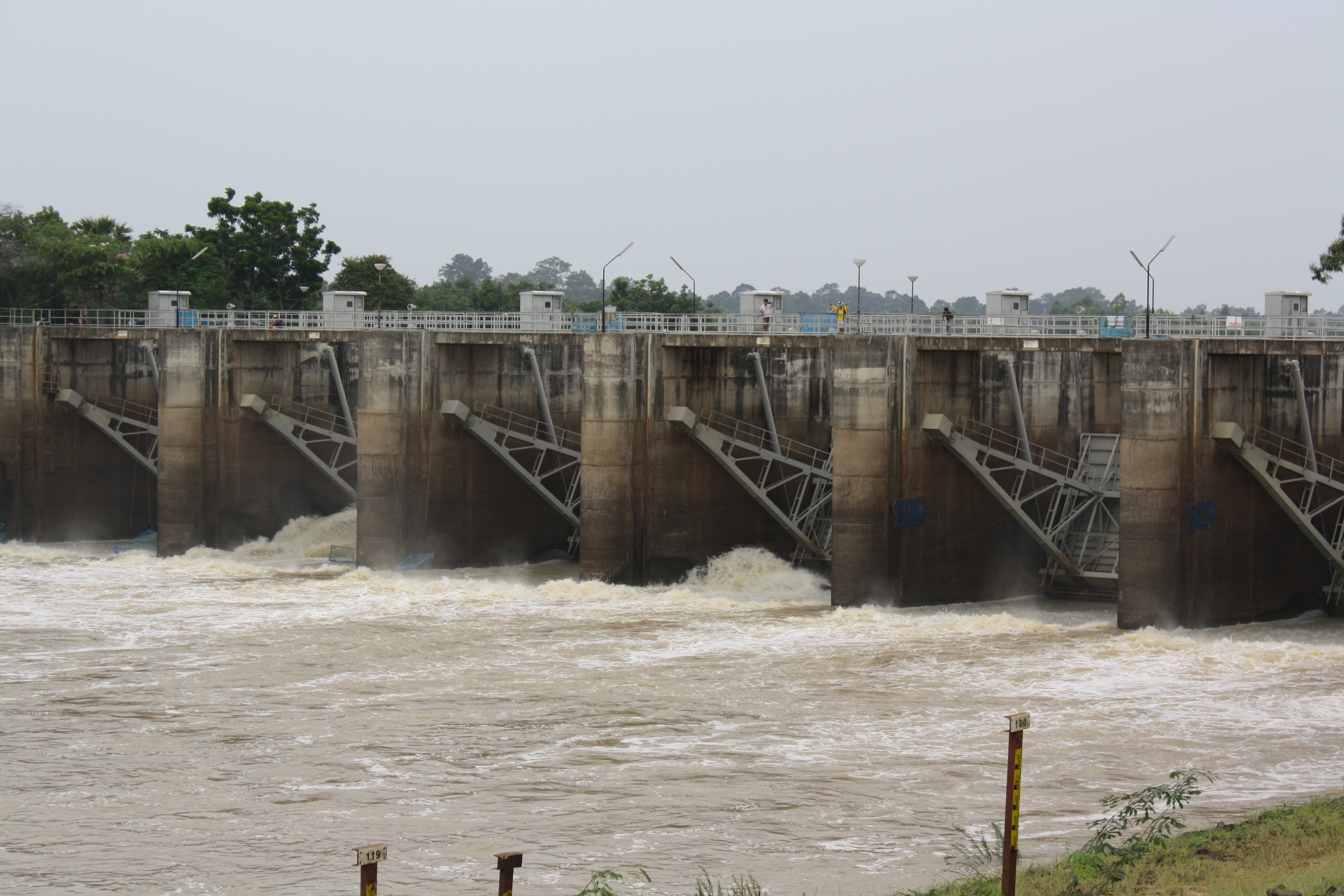
Rasi Salai Dam

Monthon Udon Thani was created in 1912, and assumed the administration of the most of region. In 1933 the monthon system was ended, and the province of Khukhan was administered directly from Bangkok. Five years later, the name of the town and province were restored to Sisaket, with the district containing Huai Nua being called Khukhan.

The Rasi Salai Dam built here in 1994 was unofficially decommissioned in July 2000, following devastation of local farming villages.

== Demographics ==
The province is populated by four main ethnic groups: Kui, Lao, Khmer, and Yer. Sisaket is one of the provinces where there is a sizable northern Khmer population. In the 2000 census it was reported that 26.2 percent of the population are capable of speaking Khmer. This is down from the 1990 census when it was reported that 30.2 percent of the population were capable of speaking Khmer. The majority are Lao speaking people.

== Symbols ==
The provincial seal shows Prasat Hin Ban Samo, a Khmer temple about 1,000 years old, in the Prang Ku District.

The provincial tree and flower of the province is the lamduan. The six leaves of the flower symbolise the six original districts of the province: Khukhan, Kantharalak, Uthumphon Phisai, Kanthararom, Rasi Salai, and Khun Han. The provincial aquatic life is the Chinese edible frog (Hoplobatrachus rugulosus).

== Economy ==
Sisaket is largely agricultural. Among other agricultural produce, it is known for its garlic and its shallots, for which it was rewarded with GI registration in 2020.

== Administrative divisions ==
Map of twenty two districts

=== Provincial government ===
The province is divided into 22 districts (amphoes). The districts are further subdivided into 206 sub-districts (tambons) and 2,411 villages (mubans).

1. Mueang Sisaket
2. Yang Chum Noi
3. Kanthararom
4. Kantharalak
5. Khukhan
6. Phrai Bueng
7. Prang Ku
8. Khun Han
9. Rasi Salai
10. Uthumphon Phisai
11. Bueng Bun
12. Huai Thap Than
13. Non Khun
14. Si Rattana
15. Nam Kliang
16. Wang Hin
17. Phu Sing
18. Mueang Chan
19. Benchalak
20. Phayu
21. Pho Si Suwan
22. Sila Lat

=== Local government ===
As of 26 November 2019 there is one Sisaket Provincial Administration Organisation (ongkan borihan suan changwat) and 37 municipal (thesaban) areas in the province. Sisaket and Kantharalak have town (thesaban mueang) status. There are a further 35 subdistrict municipalities (thesaban tambon). The non-municipal areas are administered by 179 Subdistrict Administrative Organisations, SAO (ongkan borihan suan tambon).

== Transportation ==
Sisaket is on the northeastern railway line from Bangkok (กรุงเทพอภิวัฒน์) to Warin Chamrap (วารินชำราบ). Sisaket's main station is Sisaket Railway Station. Sisaket has frequent bus service to and from Bangkok's Northern Bus Terminal (Thai: หมอชิดใหม่; RTGS: mo chit mai)

== Health ==
Sisaket's main hospital is Sisaket Hospital, a regional hospital operated by the Ministry of Public Health.

== Human achievement index 2022 ==
Health	Education	Employment	Income
52	73	64	64
Housing	Family	Transport	Participation
15	35	42	42
Province Sisaket, with an HAI 2022 value of 0.6137 is "low", occupies place 71 in the ranking.

Since 2003, United Nations Development Programme (UNDP) in Thailand has tracked progress on human development at sub-national level using the Human achievement index (HAI), a composite index covering all the eight key areas of human development. National Economic and Social Development Board (NESDB) has taken over this task since 2017.

Rank	Classification
1 - 13	"high"
14 - 29	"somewhat high"
30 - 45	"average"
46 - 61	"somewhat low"
62 - 77	"low"

Map with provinces and HAI 2022 rankings

== See also ==
- Khit cloth
- Si in place names
- Sisaket F.C.
- Sri Nakhon Lamduan Stadium
