= Phayao (disambiguation) =

Phayao may refer to:

- Phayao, capital of Phayao Province, Thailand
- Phayao Province, Thailand
- Phayao Kingdom, a kingdom in northern Thailand
- Amphoe Mueang Phayao or Mueang Phayao District, capital district of Phayao Province, Thailand
- Phayao lake an artificial lake in northern Thailand, bordering on the town Phayao
