= Wiang subdistrict, Mueang Phayao =

Wiang เวียง
- Subdistrict
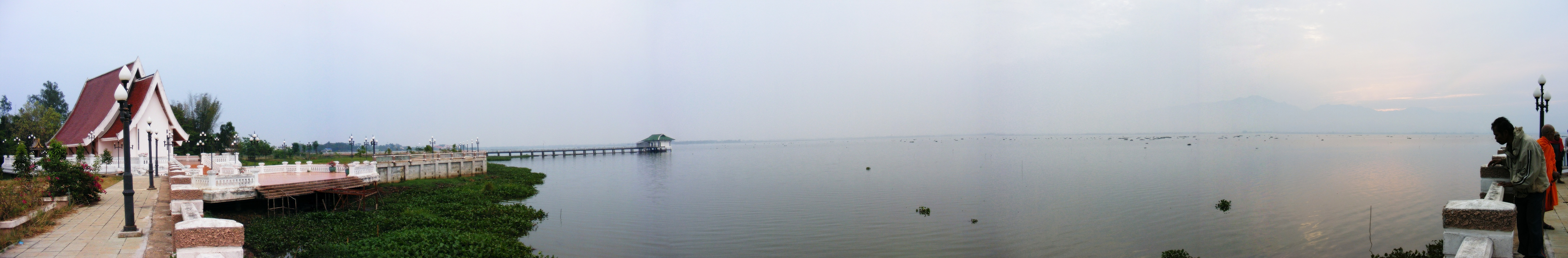

- Location within Thailand
- Coordinates: 19°10′7″N 99°54′2″E
- Country: Thailand
- Province: Phayao
- District: Mueang Phayao

Population (2010)
  - Total: 10,258
- Time zone: UTC+7 (ICT)

Wiang Subdistrict, Mueang Phayao (Thai: เวียง, pronounced [wīa̯ŋ]) is a subdistrict (tambon) of Mueang Phayao District, in Phayao Province, Thailand. As of 2010, it has a population of 10,258 people. Together with Mae Tam subdistrict it forms the town Phayao. It is in the southwestern part of the province not far from the border with Lampang Province. It lies along the National Road 1, also known as Phahon Yothin Road in this part, and is connected by road to Mae Chai in the north. It lies on the right bank of Kwan Phayao, fed by the Ing River and Tam River.

== Landmarks ==
The 3rd class Buddhist royal temple Wat Si Khom Kham lies on the lake. Locals often refer to it as Wat Phrachao Ton Luang after its large 16 metre high and 14 metre wide (at lap) Buddha, gilded between 1491 and 1524. The current temple was completed in 1923. Its most important day is Visakha Puja Day in the 8th lunar month when pilgrims arrive to pay their respects to Phrachao Ton Luang. The temple also contains intricate mural paintings in elaborate designs by artist Angkarn Kalayanapong. Nearby on the bank of the lake is the Pho Khun Ngam Mueang Memorial and public park commemorating Phu Kam Yao, a former king of Phayao, some 700 years ago. Adjacent to Wat Si Khom Kham is the Ho Watanatham Nithat Museum, an indigenous museum which relays the history and ancient traditions of the area, which numerous ancient artifacts. There is also a two-storey Cultural Exhibition Hall near the Wat, showcasing the ancient culture of Phayao; notable exhibits include a Black Buddha statue and fossil of two embracing crabs, an exhibit which is known as "Wonder Love". Wiang also contains Phayao Ram Hospital off National Road 1, Phayao Northern Lake Hotel, and Kwan Phayao Golf Course is located to the north-east.
