= San Pa Muang =

San Pa Muang สันป่าม่วง
- Tambon
- Location within Thailand
- Coordinates: 19°11′N 99°50′E
- Country: Thailand
- Province: Phayao
- Amphoe: Mueang Phayao

Population (2005)
  - Total: 3,056
- Time zone: UTC+7 (Thailand)

San Pa Muang (Thai: สันป่าม่วง, pronounced [sǎn pàː mûa̯ŋ]) is a village and tambon (subdistrict) of Mueang Phayao District, in Phayao Province, Thailand. In 2005 it had a total population of 3056 people. It is located in the south-western part of the province not far from the border with Lampang Province. It lies along the 1193 road, north of Ban Tun and north-west of Wiang. The village is noted for its Water-Hyacinth Handicraft Centre.
