= Khun Chae National Park =

National park in Chiang Rai Province, Thailand

- อุทยานแห่งชาติขุนแจ
- IUCN category II (national park)
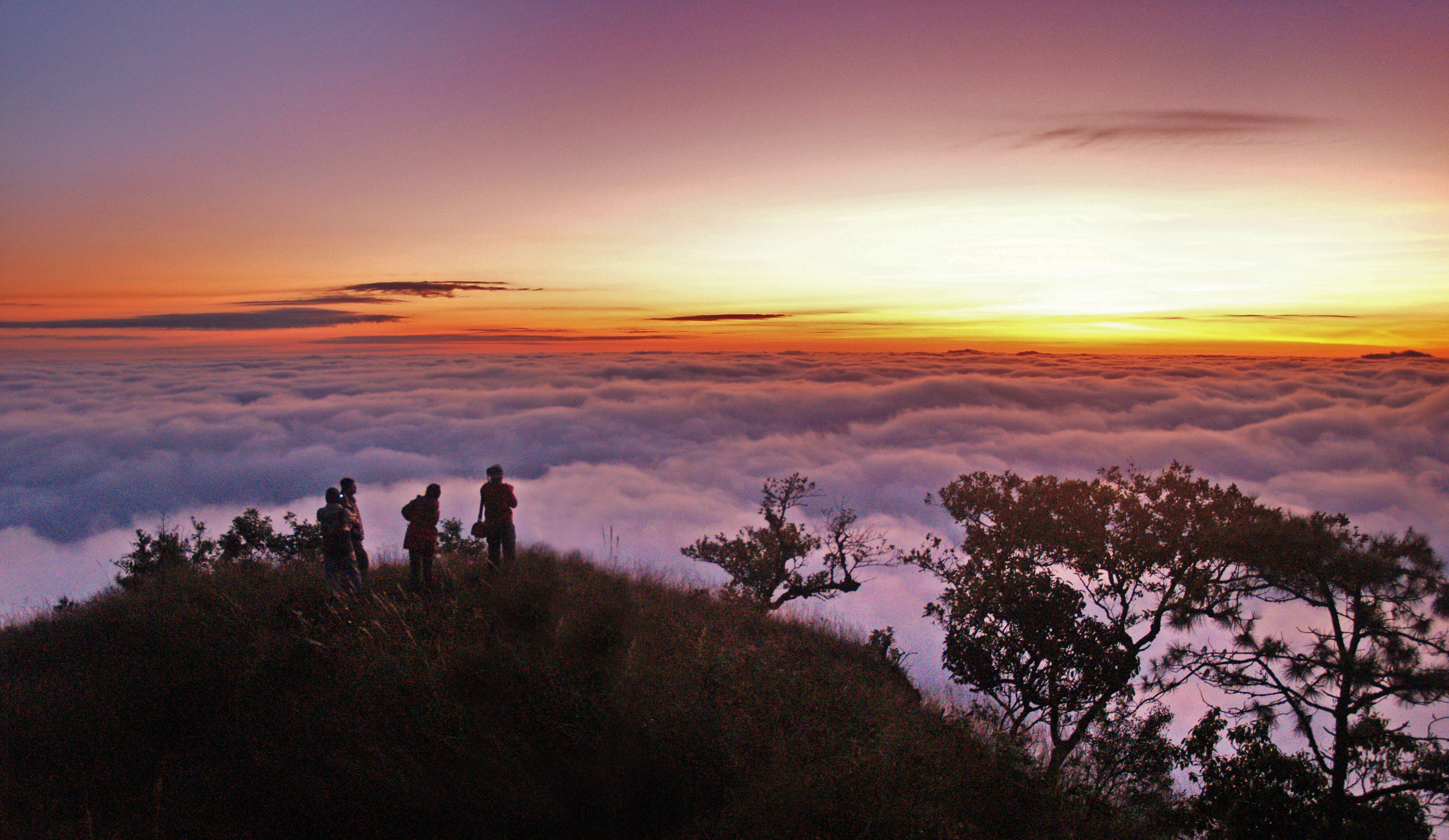
- Overlooking a sea of clouds in the park

- Location within Thailand
- Location: Chiang Rai Province, Thailand
- Nearest city: Phayao
- Coordinates: 19°9′11″N 99°28′2″E
- Area: 270 km^{2} (100 sq mi)
- Established: 1995
- Visitors: 11,240 (in 2019)
- Governing body: Department of National Parks, Wildlife and Plant Conservation

Khun Chae National Park (Thai: อุทยานแห่งชาติขุนแจ) is a national park in Chiang Rai Province, Thailand. This rugged park is home to high mountains and waterfalls.

== Geography ==
Khun Chae National Park is located about 100 kilometres (60 mi) northeast of Chiang Mai in the Wiang Pa Pao district of Chiang Rai Province. The park's area is 168,750 rai ~ 270 square kilometres (100 sq mi). Khun Chae Park is located in the Khun Tan Range and is home to the range's highest peak, Doi Lang Ka at 2,031 metres (6,660 ft). The park adjoins three other national parks: Chae Son National Park, Mae Takhrai National Park and Si Lanna National Park.

== Attractions ==
While Doi Lang Ka is the park's highest peak, another high peak, Doi Mot at 1,700 metres (5,580 ft), offers views to both the cities of Chiang Mai and Chiang Rai.

Waterfalls include the park namesake Khun Chae, a six-level waterfall, and Mae Tho, a seven-level waterfall about 40 metres (130 ft) high.

A giant ficus tree is located near the park headquarters. The tree continues to grow and as of 2006 had covered an area of more than 1,600 square metres (17,000 sq ft).

== Flora and fauna ==
The park features numerous forest types, depending on altitude, including bamboo forest, deciduous dipterocarp forest, pine forest, rainforest and evergreen forest.

Animal species include Asiatic black bear, Siamese hare, serow, barking deer, hog badger, slow loris, white-handed gibbon, leopard cat and wild boar. Reptiles include king cobra, geckos and skinks.

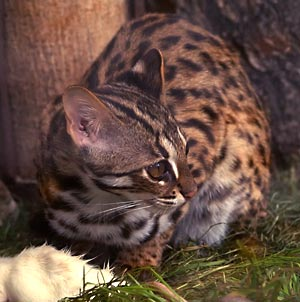
Leopard cat

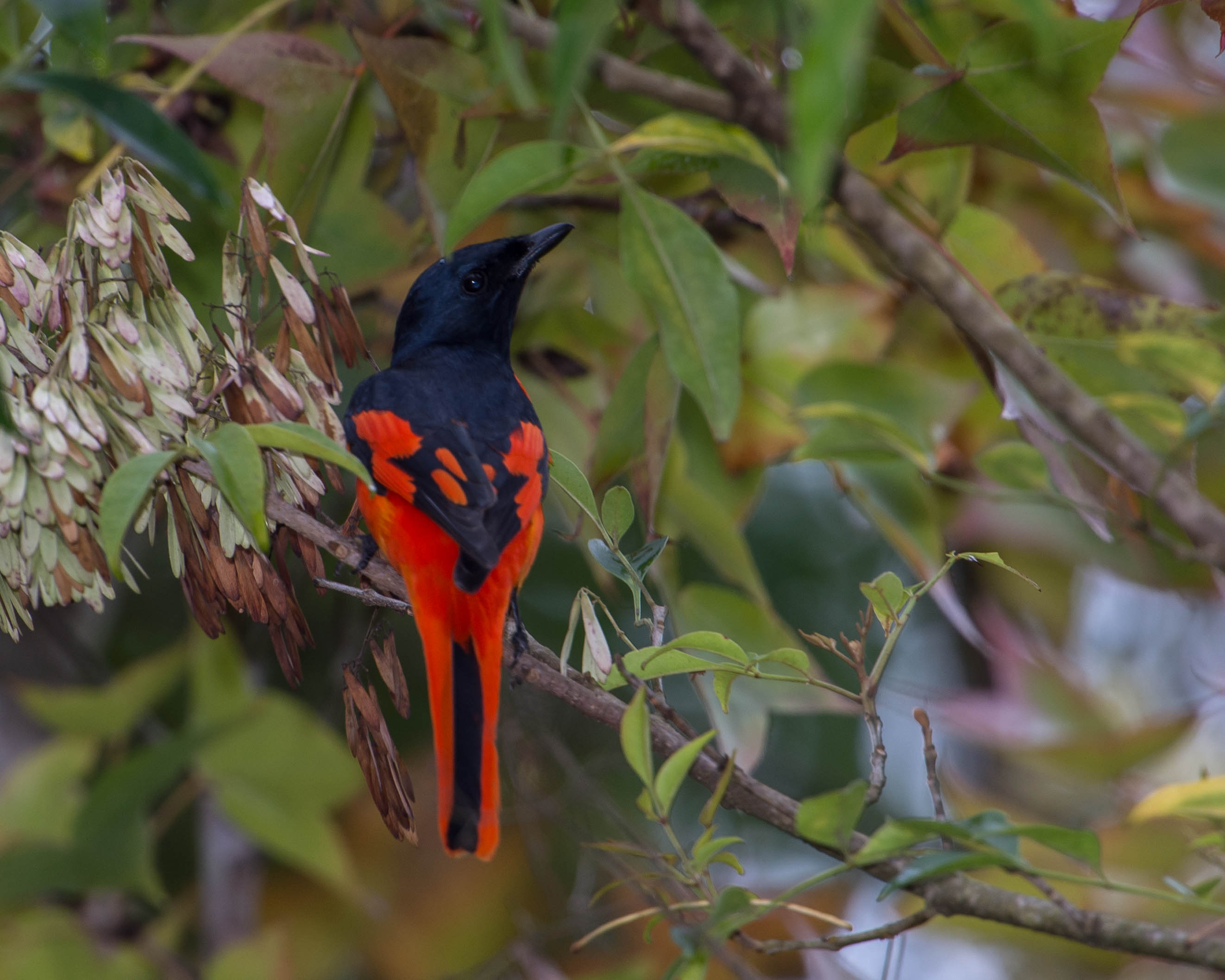
Scarlet minivet

Avian life includes scarlet minivet, red junglefowl, shikra, ashy drongo, white-crowned forktail, brown fish owl, crested serpent eagle, velvet-fronted nuthatch, blue-throated barbet, coppersmith barbet and blue-winged leafbird.

== Location ==
Khun Chae National Park in overview PARO 15 (Chiang Rai)

3) Khun Chae National Park in overview PARO 15 (Chiang Rai)

	National park
1	Doi Luang
2	Doi Phu Nang
3	Khun Chae
4	Lam Nam Kok
5	Mae Puem
6	Phu Chi Fa
7	Phu Sang
8	Tham Luang– Khun Nam Nang Non
	Wildlife sanctuary
9	Doi Pha Chang
10	Wiang Lo

	Non-hunting area
11	Chiang Saen
12	Doi Insi
13	Don Sila
14	Khun Nam Yom
15	Mae Chan
16	Mae Tho
17	Nong Bong Khai
18	Nong Leng Sai
19	Thap Phaya Lo
20	Wiang Chiang Rung
21	Wiang Thoeng

	Forest park
22	Doi Hua Mae Kham
23	Huai Nam Chang
24	Huai Sai Man
25	Namtok Huai Mae Sak
26	Namtok Huai Tat Thong
27	Namtok Khun Nam Yab
28	Namtok Mae Salong
29	Namtok Nam Min
30	Namtok Si Chomphu
31	Namtok Tat Khwan
32	Namtok Tat Sairung
33	Namtok Tat Sawan
34	Namtok Wang Than Thong
35	Phaya Phiphak
36	Rong Kham Luang
37	San Pha Phaya Phrai
38	Tham Pha Lae

== See also ==
- List of national parks of Thailand
- DNP - Khun Chae National Park
- List of Protected Areas Regional Offices of Thailand
