= Wat Si Khom Kham =

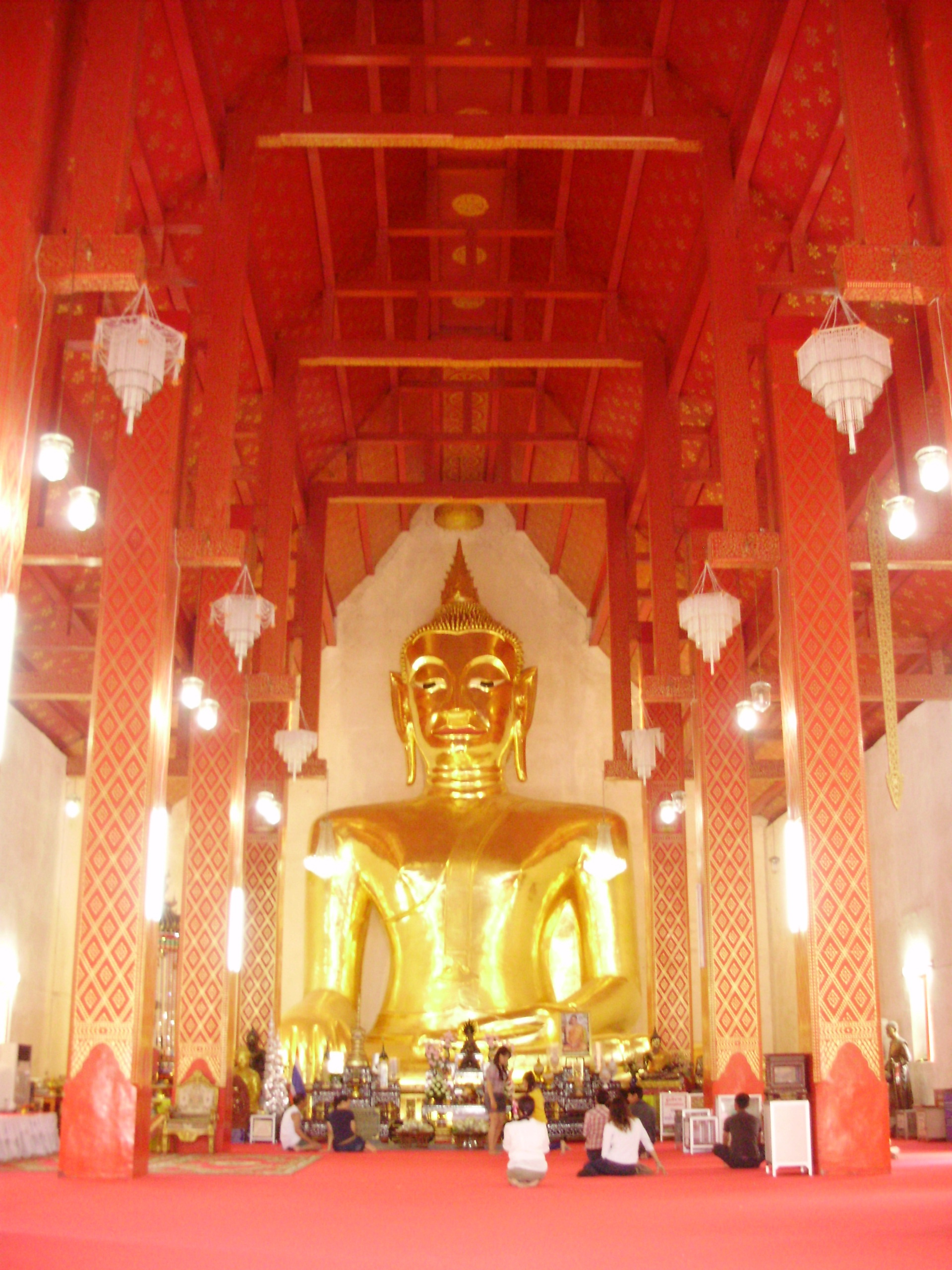
- Phra Chao Ton Luang

- Temple location in Thailand

Religion
- Affiliation: Theravada Buddhism

Location
- Location: Phayao, Phayao Province
- Country: Thailand
- Interactive map of Wat Si Khom Kham
- Coordinates: 19°10′36″N 99°53′23″E

Architecture
- Completed: 12th century

Wat Si Khom Kham (Thai: วัดศรีโคมคำ) is a Buddhist temple (wat) in Phayao town, Phayao Province, Thailand. The temple hosts the largest Chiang Saen era Buddha statue in the country. Wat Si Khom Kham is located on the shores of Phayao Lake.

== History ==
The founding of Wat Si Khom Kham dates to sometime in the 12th century. The present structure was completed in 1923. The central large Buddha statue was cast during the years 1491 to 1524.

== Architecture and art ==
The temple's wihan hosts a 16 metres (52 ft) high, 14 metres (46 ft) wide Buddha statue (Phra Chao Ton Luang) in the angular local style of the 15th and 16th centuries. Surrounding the wihan are 38 Buddha heads, some cast in the local Phayao pink sandstone, dating from the 14th century.

Another temple wihan has been built on stilts over the lake. It hosts murals painted by Thai artist Angkarn Kalayanapong. The murals are in Lanna style with some contemporary features.

== Mythology ==
Legend has it that the site for Wat Si Khom Kham was chosen by the Buddha himself. While he was seeking shelter from the sun, a tree grew miraculously on this spot from a seed planted by a bird.
