= Doi Luang National Park =

National park of Thailand

- อุทยานแห่งชาติดอยหลวง
- IUCN category II (national park)
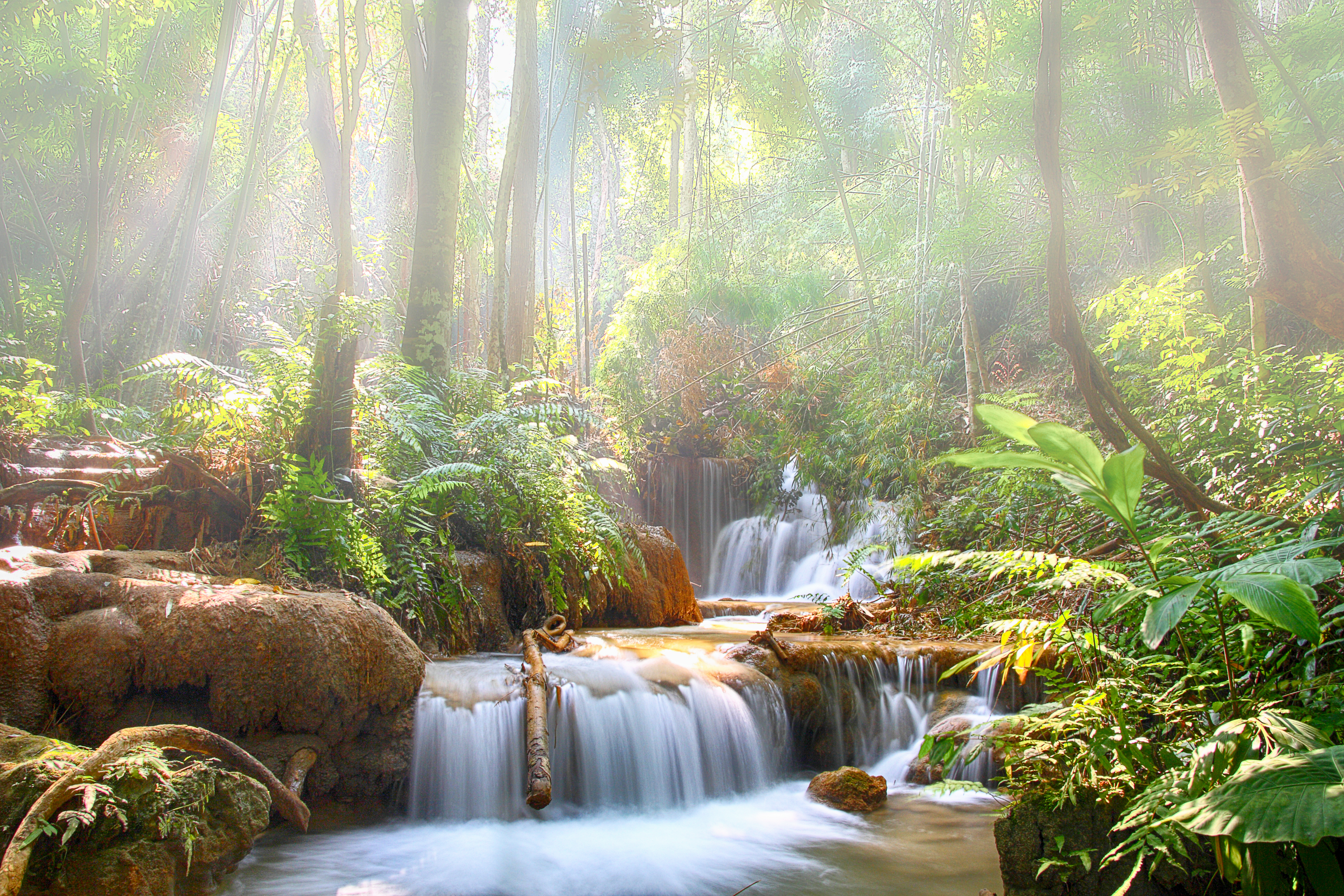
- Pu Kaeng waterfall

- Location within Thailand
- Location: Chiang Rai, Lampang and Phayao Provinces
- Coordinates: 19.20°N 99.71°E
- Area: 1,169 km^{2} (451 sq mi)
- Established: April 16, 1990
- Visitors: 41,016 (in 2019)
- Governing body: Department of National Parks, Wildlife and Plant Conservation

Doi Luang National Park (Thai: อุทยานแห่งชาติดอยหลวง) is one of the biggest national parks in Northern Thailand.

It covers the Mae Suai, Phan and Wiang Pa Pao districts of Chiang Rai Province, Wang Nuea and Ngao of Lampang Province as well as Mae Chai and Mueang Phayao of Phayao Province.

== Description ==
Doi Luang National Park, with an area of 730,927 rai ~ 1,169 square kilometres (451 sq mi) is located in the northwesternmost mountain chains of the Phi Pan Nam Range and was established in 1990 by combining the area of four existing parks.

1,426 m high Doi Luang, a mountain located towards the northern end of the park in Mae Chai District, should not be confused with Doi Luang, with an altitude of 1,694 m the highest mountain of the Phi Pan Nam Range, that is located about 30 km further south in the same mountain chain. The sources of the Wang and the Lao River are in this mountainous area. The park also has rugged rock formations and scenic waterfalls such as Namtok Pu Kaeng, Namtok Cham Pa Thong and Namtok Wang Kaew.

== Flora and fauna ==
Trees in the protected area include Mesua ferrea, Hopea odorata, Toona ciliata, Lagerstroemia tomentosa and Irvingia malayana.

Animals in the park area include the Asian black bear, sun bear, muntjac, the Indochinese leopard, bamboo rat, tree shrews; among the birds the blue-winged siva and the red-billed blue magpie deserve mention.

== Location ==
Doi Luang National Park in overview PARO 15 (Chiang Rai)

1) Doi Luang National Park in overview PARO 15 (Chiang Rai)

	National park
1	Doi Luang
2	Doi Phu Nang
3	Khun Chae
4	Lam Nam Kok
5	Mae Puem
6	Phu Chi Fa
7	Phu Sang
8	Tham Luang– Khun Nam Nang Non
	Wildlife sanctuary
9	Doi Pha Chang
10	Wiang Lo

	Non-hunting area
11	Chiang Saen
12	Doi Insi
13	Don Sila
14	Khun Nam Yom
15	Mae Chan
16	Mae Tho
17	Nong Bong Khai
18	Nong Leng Sai
19	Thap Phaya Lo
20	Wiang Chiang Rung
21	Wiang Thoeng

	Forest park
22	Doi Hua Mae Kham
23	Huai Nam Chang
24	Huai Sai Man
25	Namtok Huai Mae Sak
26	Namtok Huai Tat Thong
27	Namtok Khun Nam Yab
28	Namtok Mae Salong
29	Namtok Nam Min
30	Namtok Si Chomphu
31	Namtok Tat Khwan
32	Namtok Tat Sairung
33	Namtok Tat Sawan
34	Namtok Wang Than Thong
35	Phaya Phiphak
36	Rong Kham Luang
37	San Pha Phaya Phrai
38	Tham Pha Lae

== See also ==
- List of national parks of Thailand
- DNP - Doi Luang National Park
- List of Protected Areas Regional Offices of Thailand
