= Phu Chi Fa =

Mountain in Chiang Rai province, Thailand

- ภูชี้ฟ้า
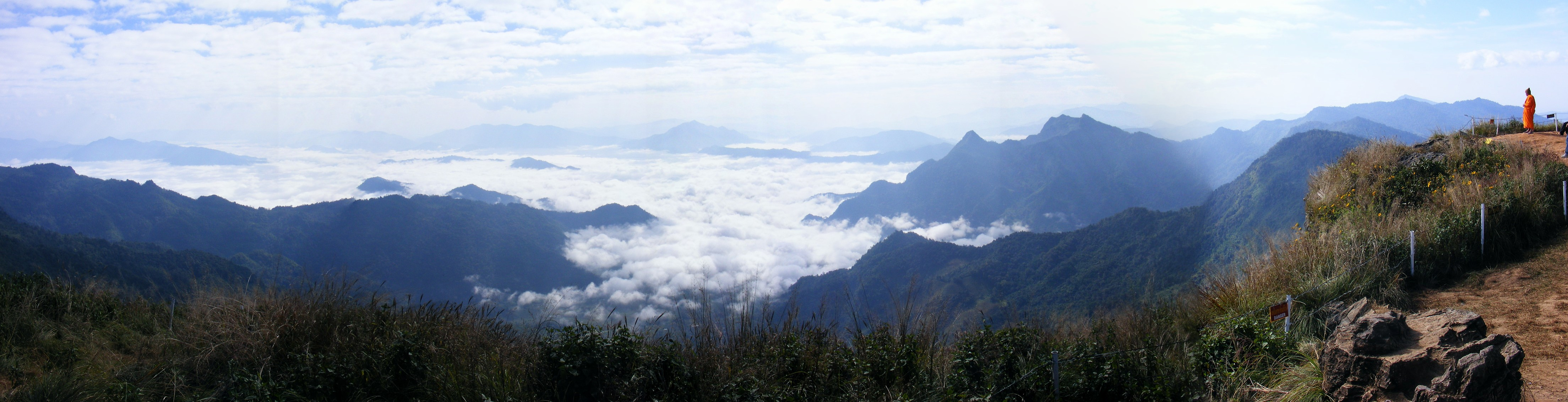
- The "sea of mist" seen from Phu Chi Fa

Highest point
- Elevation: 1,628 m (5,341 ft)
- Listing: List of mountains in Thailand
- Coordinates: 19°51′0″N 100°27′15″E

Geography
- Location within Thailand
- Location: Tap Tao, Chiang Rai Province
- Parent range: Phi Pan Nam Range

Climbing
- First ascent: unknown
- Easiest route: drive

Phu Chi Fa (Thai: ภูชี้ฟ้า, pronounced [pʰūː t͡ɕʰíː fáː]), also Phu Chee Fah, is a mountain area and national forest park in Thailand. It is located at the northeastern end of the Phi Pan Nam Range, 12 km to the southwest of Doi Pha Tang at the eastern edge of Tap Tao in Thoeng district, Chiang Rai province.

== Description ==
The cliff is part of an elevated area, the Doi Pha Mon sub-range, that rises near the border with Laos sloping towards the Mekong River which has an area of approximately 58,069 rai ~ 92.91 km^{2} (35.87 sq mi). The heights range between 1,200 and 1,628 m (3937 and 5341 ft) to the east of the mountain.

With views over the surrounding mountains, it is one of the famous tourist attractions of the Thai highlands near Chiang Rai. Tourists visit the mountain especially at dawn to catch a glimpse of the "sea of mist" and the view of the fog-surrounded hills.

== History ==
Phu Chi Fa is part of the Doi Pha Mon mountain range, which is the border between Thailand and Laos in Chiang Rai–Phayao provinces. It has a steep cliff, so it was named "Phu Chi Fa." It is believed that Phu Chi Fa was once home to ancient tribes, such as the Akha or Hmong people. Locals call the ridge pointing to the sky "Chi Fa".

In the years between 1965 and 1983, this area was a battlefield due to ideological conflicts between groups that adhered to communist principles, who formed the Communist Party of Thailand, and government officials who were sent to suppress them, resulting in tragic and bloody confrontations. After the security problems were resolved, a road was built along the Thai–Laos border from Ban Pha Tang, through Phu Chi Fa, and to Chiang Kham district. Since then, Phu Chi Fa has been well known to tourists since 1991, and The Forest Department ordered it to be a forest park again on February 6, 1998.

== Fauna ==
Phu Chi Fa is home to various animals. From the survey and interviews with local residents, the wildlife in the surveyed national forest reserve can be broadly categorized as follows:

- Birds: The most commonly seen species include the greater coucal (Centropus spp.), white-rumped shama (Copsychus malabaricus), red-whiskered bulbul (Pycnonotus blanfordi), red junglefowl (Gallus gallus), laughingthrushes (Garrulax leucolophus), house swift (Apus affinis), and various species of hawks, barn owls, starlings, magpies, orioles, mynas, drongos, owls, junglefowls, and many kinds of warblers.
- Mammals: Wild mammals include the barking deer, wild boars, palm civets, pangolins, wild rabbits (Lepus peguensis), lesser bamboo rats (Cannomys badius), Berdmore's ground squirrels (Menetes berdmorei), tree shrews (Tupaia glis), squirrels (Callosciurus), mouse-deer, flying lemurs, porcupines, civets, and small-toothed palm civets.
- Reptiles: Reptiles found include the big-headed turtle, various species of snakes, geckos, lizards, skinks, monitor lizards, pangolins, forest geckos, iguanas, centipedes, millipedes, flying lizards, and scorpions.
- Amphibians: Amphibians include the common toad, stream frogs, salamanders, water skinks, tree frogs, and bullfrogs.

== Flora ==
The forest around Phu Chi Fa supports a wide variety of plant species, contributing to the region's rich biodiversity. Tree species include the white orchid tree (Bauhinia variegata), sweet chestnut (Castanea sativa), Fagus hayatae, red beech (Fagus grandifolia), water beech (Fagus sylvatica), and giant beech (Fagus japonica). Other prominent trees include Terminalia bellerica, known for its use in traditional medicine, cinnamon (Cinnamomum verum), and aromatic species like frankincense (Boswellia sacra) and jambolan (Syzygium cumini). Wild flowering trees, such as Michelia alba, sarapee (Magnolia sirindhorniae), wild champak (Magnolia champaca), and wild magnolia, add seasonal blooms to the forest canopy.

The forest understory is similarly diverse, supporting plant species such as ground orchids, cogon grass (Imperata cylindrica), vetiver grass (Chrysopogon zizanioides), rat-tail grass (Sporobolus indicus), and broom grass (Thysanolaena maxima). Mosses and various fern species thrive in the moist, shaded conditions, creating a layered landscape beneath the taller trees. This combination provides an intricate ecosystem and sustains a wide array of wildlife.

== Climate/Season ==
The weather is influenced by two types of seasonal monsoons: the northeast monsoon, which brings cold and dry air masses from China to cover Thailand during the winter, causing Chiang Rai to have generally cold and dry weather; and the southwest monsoon, which brings moist air masses from the sea and the Indian Ocean to cover Thailand during the rainy season, causing Chiang Rai to have rain.

It is divided into three seasons:

- Summer: From mid-February to mid-May, the weather is generally hot and humid. especially in April, which is the hottest month of the year. The average maximum temperature was 31.4 degrees Celsius, with April being the hottest month. The highest temperature ever recorded was 42.0 degrees Celsius.
- Rainy: From mid-May to mid-October, which is the period when the southwest monsoon covers Thailand, the weather starts to become humid and there is heavy rain from around mid-May onwards. The month with the most rain is August.
- Winter: From mid-October to mid-February, when the northeast monsoon prevails over Thailand, the weather is generally cold and dry. The coldest month is January. The average minimum temperature was 19.9 degrees Celsius, with the coldest temperature recorded in January at 1.0 degrees Celsius.

== Tourist attractions ==
On average, Phu Chi Fa is a popular tourist attraction, drawing a high volume of visitors, with more than 250,000 to 300,000 people traveling there each year. The peak tourist season for Phu Chi Fa falls during the winter months, particularly from December to February. This time of year, is especially popular due to cooler temperate, making it the most visited place for outdoor activities and hiking in the area. During the rainy season through to winter, one of the key attractions of Phu Chi Fa is its renowned viewpoint, offering a view of the sea of mist and a sunrise. The landscape features expansive, layered mountain ranges stretching across the horizon. In the early mornings, the valleys below are often shrouded in a sea of mist, with the sun rising above it.

Phu Chi Fa's landscape presents captivating views throughout the day, not just at dawn. The region's rolling grasslands and intricate mountain ranges display varied colors across the seasons: in summer and winter, the grasslands take on a distinctive golden hue, while in the rainy season, they become lush and green. During late afternoon and evening, a gradual mist often blankets the area again

The Sakura viewing point

Near Phu Chi Fa, from December to February, the highway connecting Phu Chi Fa and Doi Pha Tang becomes a notable site for seasonal blooms. During these months, Thai cherry blossoms (Prunus cerasoides), locally known as "Nang Phaya Sua Krong," flower along both sides of the road, forming a corridor of pink blossoms. This display has become recognized for its scenic appeal, making this stretch one of Thailand's most visually striking mountain drives.

== Location ==
Phu Chi Fa National Park in overview PARO 15 (Chiang Rai)

6) Phu Chi Fa National Park in overview PARO 15 (Chiang Rai)

	National park
1	Doi Luang
2	Doi Phu Nang
3	Khun Chae
4	Lam Nam Kok
5	Mae Puem
6	Phu Chi Fa
7	Phu Sang
8	Tham Luang– Khun Nam Nang Non
	Wildlife sanctuary
9	Doi Pha Chang
10	Wiang Lo

	Non-hunting area
11	Chiang Saen
12	Doi Insi
13	Don Sila
14	Khun Nam Yom
15	Mae Chan
16	Mae Tho
17	Nong Bong Khai
18	Nong Leng Sai
19	Thap Phaya Lo
20	Wiang Chiang Rung
21	Wiang Thoeng

	Forest park
22	Doi Hua Mae Kham
23	Huai Nam Chang
24	Huai Sai Man
25	Namtok Huai Mae Sak
26	Namtok Huai Tat Thong
27	Namtok Khun Nam Yab
28	Namtok Mae Salong
29	Namtok Nam Min
30	Namtok Si Chomphu
31	Namtok Tat Khwan
32	Namtok Tat Sairung
33	Namtok Tat Sawan
34	Namtok Wang Than Thong
35	Phaya Phiphak
36	Rong Kham Luang
37	San Pha Phaya Phrai
38	Tham Pha Lae

== See also ==
- Thai highlands
- DNP - Phu Chi Fa National Park
- List of mountains in Thailand
