= Mae Tam, Phayao =

Mae Tam แม่ต๋ำ
- Subdistrict
- Country: Thailand
- Province: Phayao
- District: Mueang Phayao

Population (2010)
  - Total: 7,841
- Time zone: UTC+7 (ICT)

Mae Tam, Phayao (Thai: แม่ต๋ำ, pronounced [mɛ̂ː tǎm]) is a subdistrict (tambon) of Mueang Phayao District, in Phayao Province, Thailand. As of 2010, it has a population of 7,841 people. Together with Wiang subdistrict it forms the town Phayao.
