= Ban Mai, Phayao =

Coordinates: 19.2767°N 99.8172°E

Ban Mai
- Tambon
- Interactive map of Ban Mai
- Country: Thailand
- Province: Phayao
- Amphoe: Mueang Phayao

Population (2005)
  - Total: 4,869
- Time zone: UTC+7 (Thailand)

Ban Mai (Thai: บ้านใหม่, pronounced [bâːn màj]) is a village and tambon (subdistrict) of Mueang Phayao District, in Phayao Province, Thailand. In 2005 it had a total population of 4869 people.
