= Mae Puem =

Mae Puem แม่ปืม
- Tambon
- Country: Thailand
- Province: Phayao
- Amphoe: Mueang Phayao

Population (2005)
  - Total: 9,269
- Time zone: UTC+7 (Thailand)

Mae Puem (Thai: แม่ปืม, pronounced [mɛ̂ː pɯ̄ːm]) is a village and tambon (subdistrict) of Mueang Phayao District, in Phayao Province, Thailand. In 2005 it had a total population of 9,269 people.
