= Tha Wang Thong =

Tha Wang Thong ท่าวังทอง
- Tambon
- Country: Thailand
- Province: Phayao
- Amphoe: Mueang Phayao

Population (2005)
  - Total: 14,111
- Time zone: UTC+7 (Thailand)

Tha Wang Thong (Thai: ท่าวังทอง, pronounced [tʰâː wāŋ tʰɔ̄ːŋ]) is a village and tambon (subdistrict) of Mueang Phayao District, in Phayao Province, Thailand. In 2005 it had a total population of 14,111 people.
