= Phu Sang National Park =

National park in Northern Thailand

- อุทยานแห่งชาติภูซาง
- IUCN category II (national park)
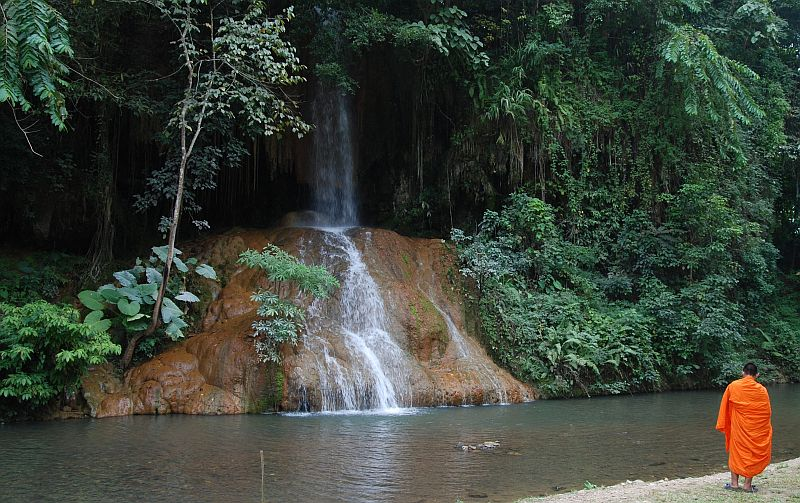
- The water of Namtok Phu Sang comes from a hot spring with water temperatures around 33-35°C

- Location within Thailand
- Location: Chiang Rai and Phayao Provinces
- Coordinates: 19°32′N 100°27′E
- Area: 285 km^{2} (110 sq mi)
- Established: 2000
- Visitors: 111,009 (in 2019)
- Governing body: Department of National Parks, Wildlife and Plant Conservation

Phu Sang National Park (Thai: อุทยานแห่งชาติภูซาง) is a national park in Northern Thailand.

It covers the Thoeng District of Chiang Rai Province and Chiang Kham and Phu Sang Districts of Phayao Province.

== Description ==
Phu Sang National Park, with an area of 178,049 rai ~ 285 square kilometres (110 sq mi) is located in one of the north-easternmost mountain chains of the Phi Pan Nam Range bordering Laos. The sources of many rivers are in these mountains. The park also has caves with stalactites and stalagmites and a warm water waterfall, Namtok Wang Kaew.

== Flora and fauna ==
Trees in the protected area include Dipterocarpus obtusifolius, Dipterocarpus alatus, Dipterocarpus turbinatus, Lagerstroemia loudonii, Lagerstroemia calyculata, Lagerstroemia tomentosa, Anisoptera costata, Michelia floribunda, Artocarpus lacucha, Pterocarpus macrocarpus, Afzelia xylocarpa, Xylia xylocarpa, Terminalia bellirica, Tectona grandis, Dillenia pentagyna, Schleichera oleosa, Lithocarpus densiflorus and Irvingia malayana.

Animals in the park area include the Indian muntjac, the Burmese hare, the Indochinese flying squirrel, black giant squirrel, the Java mouse-deer and the jungle cat.

== Location ==
Phu Sang National Park in overview PARO 15 (Chiang Rai)

7) Phu Sang National Park in overview PARO 15 (Chiang Rai)

	National park
1	Doi Luang
2	Doi Phu Nang
3	Khun Chae
4	Lam Nam Kok
5	Mae Puem
6	Phu Chi Fa
7	Phu Sang
8	Tham Luang– Khun Nam Nang Non
	Wildlife sanctuary
9	Doi Pha Chang
10	Wiang Lo

	Non-hunting area
11	Chiang Saen
12	Doi Insi
13	Don Sila
14	Khun Nam Yom
15	Mae Chan
16	Mae Tho
17	Nong Bong Khai
18	Nong Leng Sai
19	Thap Phaya Lo
20	Wiang Chiang Rung
21	Wiang Thoeng

	Forest park
22	Doi Hua Mae Kham
23	Huai Nam Chang
24	Huai Sai Man
25	Namtok Huai Mae Sak
26	Namtok Huai Tat Thong
27	Namtok Khun Nam Yab
28	Namtok Mae Salong
29	Namtok Nam Min
30	Namtok Si Chomphu
31	Namtok Tat Khwan
32	Namtok Tat Sairung
33	Namtok Tat Sawan
34	Namtok Wang Than Thong
35	Phaya Phiphak
36	Rong Kham Luang
37	San Pha Phaya Phrai
38	Tham Pha Lae

== See also ==
- List of national parks of Thailand
- DNP - Phu Sang National Park
- List of Protected Areas Regional Offices of Thailand
