= Mae Na Ruea =

Mae Na Ruea แม่นาเรือ
- Subdistrict
- Country: Thailand
- Province: Phayao
- District: Mueang Phayao

Population (2005)
  - Total: 9,072
- Time zone: UTC+7 (ICT)

Mae Na Ruea (Thai: แม่นาเรือ, pronounced [mɛ̂ː nāː rɯ̄a̯]) is a village and tambon (subdistrict) of Mueang Phayao District, in Phayao Province, Thailand. In 2005 it had a population of 9072 people.
