= Cham Pa Wai =

Cham Pa Wai จำป่าหวาย
- Tambon
- Country: Thailand
- Province: Phayao
- Amphoe: Mueang Phayao

Population (2005)
  - Total: 8,482
- Time zone: UTC+7 (Thailand)

Cham Pa Wai (Thai: จำป่าหวาย, pronounced [t͡ɕām pàː wǎːj]) is a village and tambon (subdistrict) of Mueang Phayao District, in Phayao Province, Thailand. In 2005, it had a total population of 8,482 people.
