= Ban Tom =

Ban Tom บ้านต๋อม
- Tambon
- Interactive map of Ban Tom
- Coordinates: 19.19613°N 99.83783°E
- Country: Thailand
- Province: Phayao
- Amphoe: Mueang Phayao

Population (2005)
  - Total: 13,308
- Time zone: UTC+7 (Thailand)

Ban Tom (Thai: บ้านต๋อม, pronounced [bâːn tɔ̌m]) is a village and tambon (subdistrict) of Mueang Phayao District, in Phayao Province, Thailand. In 2005, it had a total population of 13,308 people.
