= Tha Champi =

Coordinates: 19.2431°N 99.8273°E

Tha Champi ท่าจำปี
- Tambon
- Interactive map of Tha Champi
- Country: Thailand
- Province: Phayao
- Amphoe: Mueang Phayao

Population (2005)
  - Total: 4,100
- Time zone: UTC+7 (Thailand)

Tha Champi (Thai: ท่าจำปี, pronounced [tʰâː t͡ɕām.pīː]) is a village and tambon (subdistrict) of Mueang Phayao District, in Phayao Province, Thailand. In 2005 it had a total population of 4100 people.
