= Ban Sang =

Ban Sang may refer to:

- Ban Sang District, Prachinburi Province, Thailand
- Ban Sang, Phayao, Thailand
