= Mae Sai, Phayao =

Coordinates: 20°26′N 99°53′E

Mae Sai
- Tambon
- Interactive map of Mae Sai
- Country: Thailand
- Province: Phayao
- Amphoe: Mueang Phayao

Population (2005)
  - Total: 6,451
- Time zone: UTC+7 (Thailand)

Mae Sai (Thai: แม่ใส, pronounced [mɛ̂ː sǎj]) is a village and tambon (subdistrict) of Mueang Phayao District, in Phayao Province, Thailand. In 2005 it had a total population of 6451 people.
