= Ban Tam =

Ban Tam บ้านต๊ำ
- Tambon
- Interactive map of Ban Tam
- Coordinates: 19.2170°N 99.8152°E
- Country: Thailand
- Province: Phayao
- Amphoe: Mueang Phayao

Population (2005)
  - Total: 7,310
- Time zone: UTC+7 (Thailand)

Ban Tam (Thai: บ้านต๊ำ, pronounced [bâːn tám]) is a village and tambon (subdistrict) of Mueang Phayao District, in Phayao Province, Thailand. In 2005, it had a total population of 7,310 people.
