= Doi Phu Nang National Park =

National park in Thailand

- อุทยานแห่งชาติดอยภูนาง
- IUCN category II (national park)
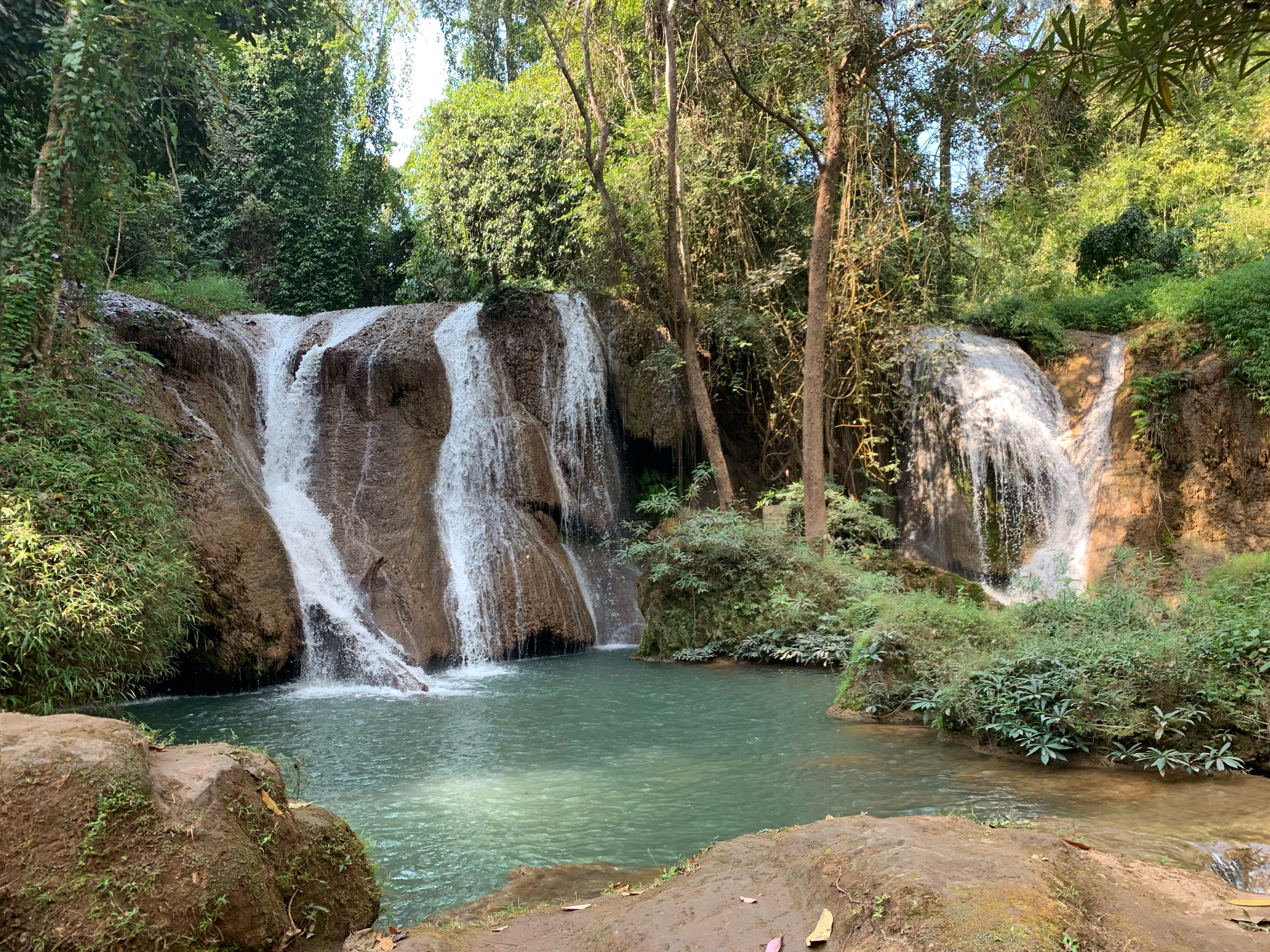
- Than Sawan Waterfall in the national park

- Location within Thailand
- Location: Phayao Province
- Coordinates: 19.0°N 100.16°E
- Area: 860 km^{2} (330 sq mi)
- Established: 2012
- Visitors: 35,181 (in 2019)
- Governing body: Department of National Parks, Wildlife and Plant Conservation

Doi Phu Nang National Park (Thai: อุทยานแห่งชาติดอยภูนาง) is a national park in Dok Khamtai, Pong and Chiang Muan Districts, Phayao Province, Thailand.

== Description ==
The national park, with an area of 537,424 rai ~ 860 square kilometres (330 sq mi) is located in two mountain chains of the Phi Pan Nam Range, Mae Yom and Nampi, with a not-protected area in between. There are both mixed evergreen forests, dipterocarp forest and dry deciduous forests in the park area.

Doi Phu Nang, the mountain that gives its name to the park, with an altitude of 1,202 m, is the highest peak in the area. The sources of two tributaries of the Yom River are in this mountain. The park also has scenic rock formations and two impressive waterfalls, Namtok Than Sawan and Namtok Huai Ton Phueng.

== Flora and fauna ==
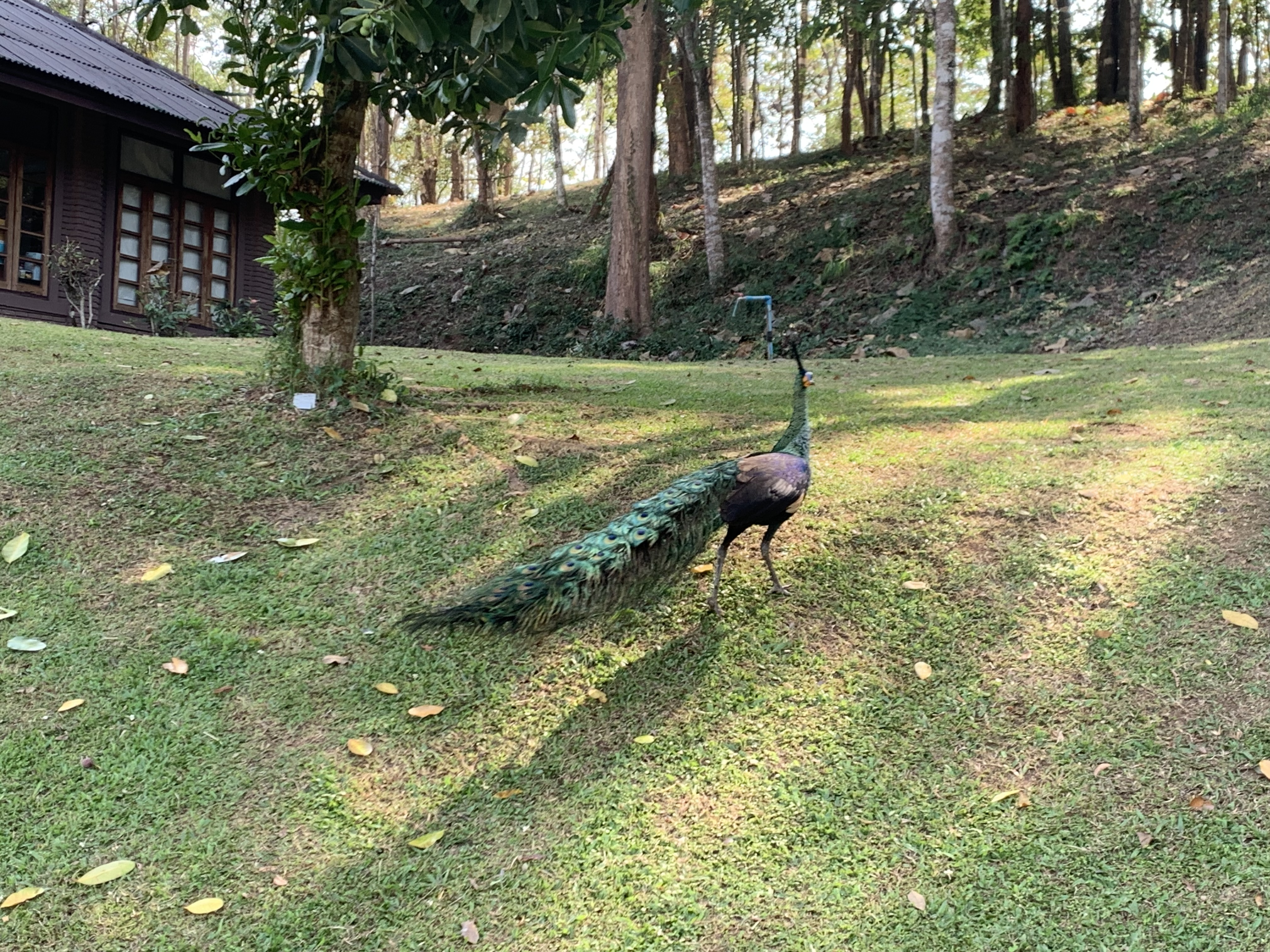
A green peafowl near the park office

Trees in the protected area include Malabar ironwood, Afzelia xylocarpa, Lagerstroemia calyculata, Mangifera caloneura, Ailanthus triphysa, Michelia alba, Berrya ammonilla, Schleichera oleosa, Vitex pinnata and Pterocarpus macrocarpus.

A variety of birds are found, especially the rare green peafowls, threatened by habitat destruction, which come to the park area for breeding from January to March. Among the other animals, the fishing cat, Asiatic black bear, muntjac, masked palm civet, bamboo rat, tree shrews, the Asiatic softshell turtle and the Bengal monitor deserve mention.

== Location ==
Doi Phu Nang National Park in overview PARO 15 (Chiang Rai)

2) Doi Phu Nang National Park in overview PARO 15 (Chiang Rai)

	National park
1	Doi Luang
2	Doi Phu Nang
3	Khun Chae
4	Lam Nam Kok
5	Mae Puem
6	Phu Chi Fa
7	Phu Sang
8	Tham Luang– Khun Nam Nang Non
	Wildlife sanctuary
9	Doi Pha Chang
10	Wiang Lo

	Non-hunting area
11	Chiang Saen
12	Doi Insi
13	Don Sila
14	Khun Nam Yom
15	Mae Chan
16	Mae Tho
17	Nong Bong Khai
18	Nong Leng Sai
19	Thap Phaya Lo
20	Wiang Chiang Rung
21	Wiang Thoeng

	Forest park
22	Doi Hua Mae Kham
23	Huai Nam Chang
24	Huai Sai Man
25	Namtok Huai Mae Sak
26	Namtok Huai Tat Thong
27	Namtok Khun Nam Yab
28	Namtok Mae Salong
29	Namtok Nam Min
30	Namtok Si Chomphu
31	Namtok Tat Khwan
32	Namtok Tat Sairung
33	Namtok Tat Sawan
34	Namtok Wang Than Thong
35	Phaya Phiphak
36	Rong Kham Luang
37	San Pha Phaya Phrai
38	Tham Pha Lae

== See also ==
- List of national parks of Thailand
- List of Protected Areas Regional Offices of Thailand
