= Dok Khamtai district =

Dok Khamtai ดอกคำใต้
- District
- District location in Phayao province
- Coordinates: 19°9′45″N 99°59′36″E
- Country: Thailand
- Province: Phayao
- Seat: Don Si Chum

Area
  - Total: 823.3 km^{2} (317.9 sq mi)

Population (2005)
  - Total: 73,205
  - Density: 88.9/km^{2} (230/sq mi)
- Time zone: UTC+7 (ICT)
- Postal code: 56120
- Geocode: 5605

Dok Khamtai (Thai: ดอกคำใต้, pronounced [dɔ̀ːk kʰām.tâːj]; Northern Thai: ᨯᩬᨠᨤᩴᩣᩲᨲ᩶, pronounced [dɔ̀ːk kʰām.ta᷇ːj]) is a district (amphoe) of Phayao province in northern Thailand.

== History ==
Originally created in 1832, the district was abolished on 23 December 1917 and incorporated into Mueang Phayao district. It was recreated as a minor district (king amphoe) on 23 January 1963. It was again upgraded to a full district on 27 July 1965.

== Etymology ==
Dok Khamtai is the Thai name of the sponge tree (Acacia farnesiana (L.) Willd.).

== Geography ==
Neighboring districts are (from the north clockwise): Pa Daet of Chiang Rai province; Chun, Pong, and Chiang Muan of Phayao Province; Song of Phrae province; Ngao of Lampang province; and Mueang Phayao and Phu Kamyao of Phayao.

The main water course is the Ing River. Doi Phu Nang National Park is in the district.

== Economy ==
The district is "...famous in Thailand for the numbers of sex workers it exports and there is even a popular song titled 'plaeng saaw dok kham tai' ('song of the young women from Dok Khamtai') about girls from this district coming to Bangkok." The district is also mentioned prominently in Pasuk Phongpaichit's 1982 study, From Peasant Girls to Bangkok Masseuses.

== Administration ==
The district is divided into 12 sub-districts (tambons), which are further subdivided into 124 villages (mubans). There are two townships (thesaban tambons). Dok Khamtai covers parts of tambons Dok Khamtai, Don Si Chum, Sawang Arom, and tambon Bun Koet. Ban Tham covers tambon Ban Tham. There are a further nine tambon administrative organizations (TAO).

No.	Name	Thai name	Pop.
1.	Dok Khamtai	ดอกคำใต้	6,274
2.	Don Si Chum	ดอนศรีชุม	6,222
3.	Ban Tham	บ้านถ้ำ	8,510
4.	Ban Pin	บ้านปิน	5,526
5.	Huai Lan	ห้วยลาน	9,326
6.	San Khong	สันโค้ง	6,594
7.	Pa Sang	ป่าซาง	5,379
8.	Nong Lom	หนองหล่ม	5,968
9.	Dong Suwan	ดงสุวรรณ	5,338
10.	Bun Koet	บุญเกิด	5,037
11.	Sawang Arom	สว่างอารมณ์	4,243
12.	Khue Wiang	คือเวียง	4,788
