= Chun district =

Chun จุน
- District
- District location in Phayao province
- Coordinates: 19°20′14″N 100°8′6″E
- Country: Thailand
- Province: Phayao

Area
  - Total: 571.2 km^{2} (220.5 sq mi)

Population (2005)
  - Total: 52,066
  - Density: 91.2/km^{2} (236/sq mi)
- Time zone: UTC+7 (ICT)
- Postal code: 56150
- Geocode: 5602

Chun (Thai: จุน, pronounced [t͡ɕūn]) is a district (amphoe) of Phayao province in northern Thailand.

== History ==
Chun District dates back to an ancient city named Wiang Lo, which is of similar age as Mueang Phayao.

== Geography ==
Neighboring districts are (from the east clockwise): Chiang Kham, Pong and Dok Khamtai of Phayao Province, Pa Daet and Thoeng of Chiang Rai province.

The important water resources are the Ing and Chun Rivers.

== Administration ==
The district is divided into seven sub-districts (tambons), which are further subdivided into 88 villages (mubans). Huai Khao Kam is a township (thesaban tambon) covering parts of tambon Huai Khao Kam. There are a further six tambon administrative organization (TAO).

No.	Name	Thai name	Pop.
1.	Huai Khao Kam	ห้วยข้าวก่ำ	8,893
2.	Chun	จุน	9,889
3.	Lo	ลอ	6,724
4.	Hong Hin	หงส์หิน	7,157
5.	Thung Ruang Thong	ทุ่งรวงทอง	8,072
6.	Huai Yang Kham	ห้วยยางขาม	6,102
7.	Phra That Khing Kaeng	พระธาตุขิงแกง	5,229
