= Ban Sang, Phayao =

Ban Sang บ้านสาง
- Tambon
- Interactive map of Ban Sang
- Coordinates: 19.16406°N 99.833143°E
- Country: Thailand
- Province: Phayao
- Amphoe: Mueang Phayao

Population (2005)
  - Total: 4,433
- Time zone: UTC+7 (Thailand)

Ban Sang (Thai: บ้านสาง, pronounced [bâːn sǎːŋ]) is a village and tambon (subdistrict) of Mueang Phayao District, in Phayao Province, Thailand. In 2005 it had a total population of 4433 people.
