= Phu Kamyao district =

Phu Kamyao ภูกามยาว
- District
- District location in Phayao province
- Coordinates: 19°16′18″N 99°58′12″E
- Country: Thailand
- Province: Phayao
- Seat: Huai Kaeo

Area
  - Total: 213.8 km^{2} (82.5 sq mi)

Population (2005)
  - Total: 22,659
  - Density: 106/km^{2} (270/sq mi)
- Time zone: UTC+7 (ICT)
- Postal code: 56000
- Geocode: 5609

Phu Kamyao (Thai: ภูกามยาว, pronounced [pʰūː kāːm.jāːw]; Northern Thai: ᨻᩪᨠᩣ᩠ᨾᨿᩣ᩠ᩅ, pronounced [pūː kǎːm.ɲāːw]) is a district (amphoe) of Phayao province in northern Thailand.

== Geography ==
Neighboring districts are (from the north clockwise): Pa Daet of Chiang Rai province; Dok Khamtai, Mueang Phayao, and Mae Chai of Phayao Province.

The mountains of the Phi Pan Nam Range dominate the landscape of the district.

== History ==
The minor district was established on 1 July 1997, when it was split off from Mueang Phayao district.

The Thai government on 15 May 2007, upgraded all of 81 minor districts to full districts. With publication in the Royal Gazette on 24 August the upgrade became official.

== Administration ==
The district is divided into three sub-districts (tambons), which are further subdivided into 40 villages (mubans). Dong Chen is a township (thesaban tambon) which covers parts of tambons Dong Chen and Mae Ing. There are a further three tambon administrative organization (TAO).

No.	Name	Thai name	Pop.
1.	Huai Kaeo	ห้วยแก้ว	8,917
2.	Dong Chen	ดงเจน	9,217
3.	Mae Ing	แม่อิง	4,525
