= Ban Tun =

Coordinates: 19°8′N 99°49′E

- Subdistrict
- Interactive map of Ban Tun
- Country: Thailand
- Province: Phayao
- District: Mueang Phayao

Population (2005)
  - Total: 5,098
- Time zone: UTC+7 (ICT)

Ban Tun (Thai: บ้านตุ่น, pronounced [bâːn tùn]) is a village and tambon (sub-district) of Mueang Phayao District, in Phayao Province, Thailand. In 2005 it had a population of 5,098 people.

Doi Luang, the highest point of the Phi Pan Nam Range is at the western end of the sub-district.

== Economy ==
Ban Dok Bua, a village in the sub-district, is home to two organic rice cooperatives. "Ban Dok Bua Organic Rice" product debuted in the health food market in 2013. The "Happy Rice Limited Partnership" was registered in 2014 and serves as a principal supplier of "khao kum" (also known as "khao luem phua") in the province. Due to its chemical-free rice farming, Ban Dok Bua rice producers won the Sustainable Community King's Cup award in 2010 and 2011.
