= Mueang Phayao district =

Mueang Phayao เมืองพะเยา
- District
- District location in Phayao province
- Coordinates: 19°11′31″N 99°52′43″E
- Country: Thailand
- Province: Phayao
- Seat: Ban Tom

Area
  - Total: 842.1 km^{2} (325.1 sq mi)

Population (2014)
  - Total: 126,750
  - Density: 143.8/km^{2} (372/sq mi)
- Time zone: UTC+7 (ICT)
- Postal code: 56000
- Geocode: 5601

Mueang Phayao (Thai: เมืองพะเยา, pronounced [mɯ̄aŋ pʰā.jāw]; Northern Thai: ᨾᩮᩬᩥᨦᨻᩕᨿᩣ᩠ᩅ, pronounced [mɯ̄aŋ pʰā.ɲāːw]) is the capital district (amphoe mueang) of Phayao province, northern Thailand.

== Geography ==
Neighboring districts are (from the north clockwise): Mai Chai of Phayao Province; Pa Daet of Chiang Rai province; Phu Kamyao, Dok Khamtai of Phayao Province; Ngao and Wang Nuea of Lampang province.

Doi Luang, the highest point of the Phi Pan Nam Range is at the western end of the district.

== History ==
In 1917 Phayao district was renamed Mueang Phayao. In 1938 the word "mueang" was removed, as only the capital districts of the provinces were to have that name. With the creation of Phayao Province in 1977, the district was named Mueang Phayao again.

== Administration ==
=== Central administration ===
Mueang Phayao district is divided into 15 sub-districts (tambons), which are further subdivided into 172 administrative villages (mubans).

No.	Name	Thai	Villages	Pop.
1.	Wiang	เวียง	-	9,773
2.	Mae Tam	แม่ต๋ำ	-	7,694
4.	Mae Na Ruea	แม่นาเรือ	18	8,872
5.	Ban Tun	บ้านตุ่น	11	4,944
6.	Ban Tam	บ้านต๊ำ	13	7,274
7.	Ban Tom	บ้านต๋อม	18	12,462
8.	Mae Puem	แม่ปืม	18	9,250
10.	Mae Ka	แม่กา	18	20,019
11.	Ban Mai	บ้านใหม่	9	4,761
12.	Cham Pa Wai	จำป่าหวาย	13	8,454
13.	Tha Wang Thong	ท่าวังทอง	14	15,097
14.	Mae Sai	แม่ใส	12	6,263
15.	Ban Sang	บ้านสาง	9	4,339
16.	Tha Champi	ท่าจำปี	11	3,935
18.	San Pa Muang	สันป่าม่วง	8	3,613

Missing numbers belong to tambons which now form Phu Kamyao District.

=== Local administration ===
There is one town (Thesaban Mueang) in the district:

- Phayao (Thai: เทศบาลเมืองพะเยา) consisting of sub-district Wiang, Mae Tam.

There are nine sub-district municipalities (thesaban tambons) in the district:

- Tha Wang Thong (Thai: เทศบาลตำบลท่าวังทอง) consisting of sub-district Tha Wang Thong.
- Ban Tam (Thai: เทศบาลตำบลบ้านต๊ำ) consisting of sub-district Ban Tam.
- Mae Puem (Thai: เทศบาลตำบลแม่ปืม) consisting of sub-district Mae Puem.
- Mae Ka (Thai: เทศบาลตำบลแม่กา) consisting of sub-district Mae Ka.
- Ban Tom (Thai: เทศบาลตำบลบ้านต๋อม) consisting of sub-district Ban Tom.
- Ban Mai (Thai: เทศบาลตำบลบ้านใหม่) consisting of sub-district Ban Mai.
- Ban Sang (Thai: เทศบาลตำบลบ้านสาง) consisting of sub-district Ban Sang.
- Tha Champi (Thai: เทศบาลตำบลท่าจำปี) consisting of sub-district Tha Champi.
- San Pa Muang (Thai: เทศบาลตำบลสันป่าม่วง) consisting of sub-district San Pa Muang.

There are four sub-district administrative organizations (SAO) in the district:

- Mae Na Ruea (Thai: องค์การบริหารส่วนตำบลแม่นาเรือ) consisting of sub-district Mae Na Ruea.
- Ban Tun (Thai: องค์การบริหารส่วนตำบลบ้านตุ่น) consisting of sub-district Ban Tun.
- Cham Pa Wai (Thai: องค์การบริหารส่วนตำบลจำป่าหวาย) consisting of sub-district Cham Pa Wai.
- Mae Sai (Thai: องค์การบริหารส่วนตำบลแม่ใส) consisting of sub-district Mae Sai.
