= Angkarn Kalayanapong =

Thai poet and artist (1926–2012)

Angkarn Kalayanapong

Angkarn Kalayanapong (Thai: อังคาร กัลยาณพงศ์; RTGS: Angkhan Kanlayanaphong; 13 February 1926 – 25 August 2012) was a Thai poet and artist. He was named a National Artist of Thailand in 1989, and won the S.E.A. Write Award in 1986.

Angkarn was born in Nakhon Si Thammarat Province in Southern Thailand. His father was a sub-district headman (kamnan). As a high school student, he started writing poems. He was admitted to study painting at the art-specialised Silpakorn University where he was taught, amongst others, by Silpa Bhirasri. In the 1950s, he became a professional writer. He deviated from the traditional schemes and rules of Thai poetry, which initially drew him criticism. Angkarn won the S.E.A. Write Award in 1986 and was named National Artist of Thailand in the field of literature in 1989. Next to his poetic works, Angkarn was noted for his drawings and paintings.

Angkarn was married and had one son and two daughters. In 2006, he supported the People's Alliance for Democracy ("Yellow Shirts") in their protests against Prime Minister Thaksin Shinawatra. After suffering from a long-term heart disease and diabetes, Angkarn died at the age of 86 in Samitivej Hospital, Bangkok.
