= Phayao Lake =

Lake in Thailand

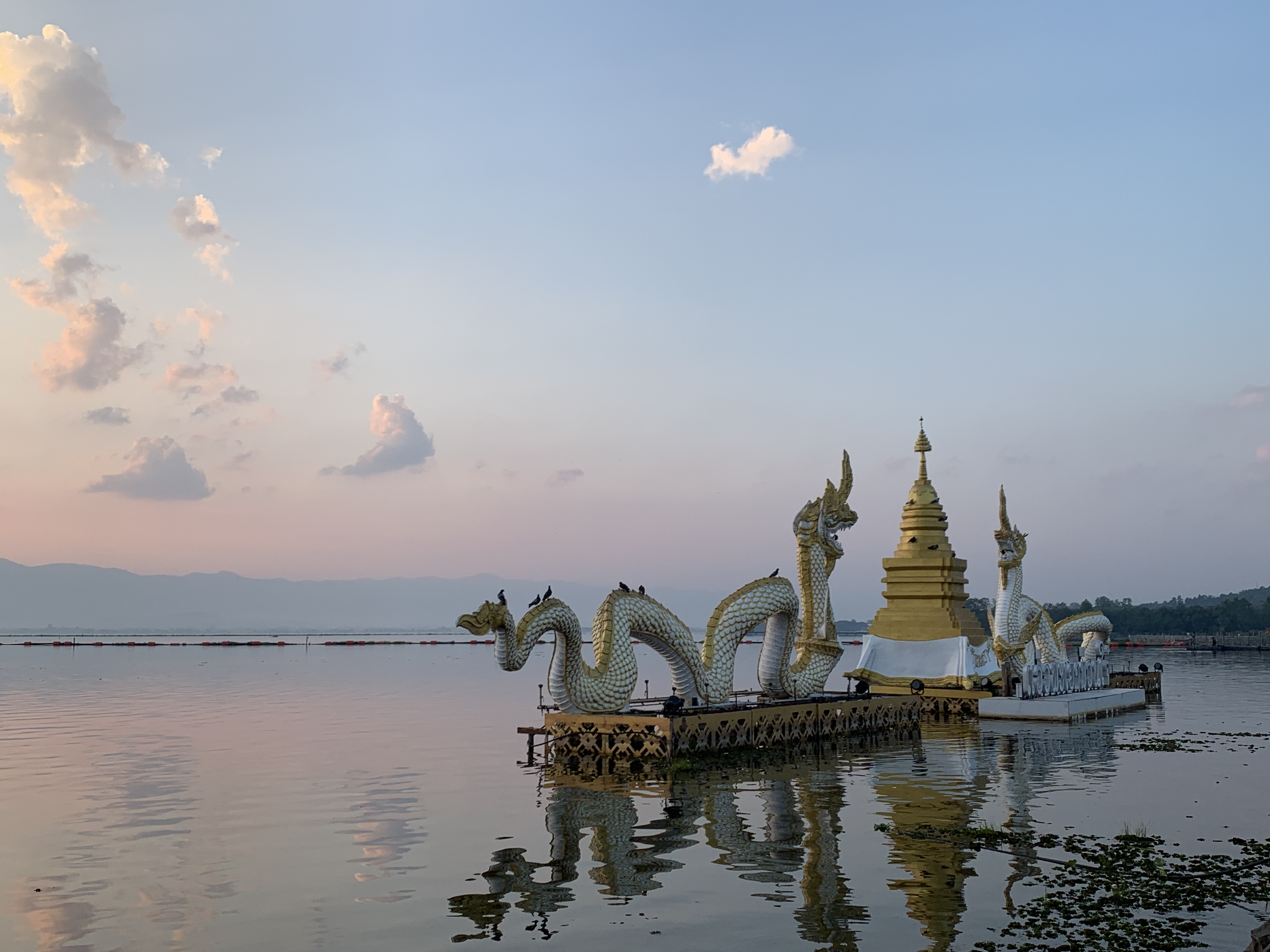
- Sunset at Phayao Lake, 2021

- Location within Thailand
- Location: Phayao Province, Northern Thailand
- Coordinates: 19°10′N 99°52′E
- Primary inflows: Ing River, Tam River
- Primary outflows: Ing River
- Basin countries: Thailand
- Surface area: 1,980 hectares (19.8 km^{2})
- Average depth: 1.5 metres (4 ft 11 in)
- Max. depth: 4 metres (13 ft)
- Shore length^{1}: 25.16 kilometres (15.63 mi)
- Surface elevation: 393 metres (1,289 ft)
- Settlements: Phayao
- ^{1} Shore length is not a well-defined measure.

Kwan Phayao (Thai: กว๊านพะเยา, RTGS: Kwan Phayao, pronounced [kwáːn pʰā.jāw]) is a lake in Phayao Province, Northern Thailand. Kwan, a word from the northern Thai language, means 'lake' or 'large swamp'. The shape of the lake is a nearly-half-circle-moon shape. Phayao Lake is the largest freshwater lake in the northern region and the fourth largest in the country, with a depth of 1.5 metres, and covers an area of about 1,980 hectares. There are about 50 species of fish in Phayao Lake.

== History ==
Phayao Lake began from the collapse of the lithosphere about 70 million years ago. This area was surrounded by low mountains before. There are 18 creeks mixing together here. In 1935, the department of fisheries had set up Phayao inland fisheries station on Ing River and made the dam, which cause a large swamp with a depth of 1.5 metres. “Nong Lang” was one of the most prominent ponds. The land at the northern and southern ends of the area during summer is dry, so it is possible to walk through the area.

Before 1941, Phayao Lake was a vast area of lowland. It was humid in the rainy season (around July to November). The Ing River flowed through the area, creating many large ponds called “nong” and smaller ones called “buak”. The floodwaters made waterways connected with each other creating two lakes, one called “Kwan Noi” which means small lake, located in the west. The other one called “Kwan Luang,” located in the east, near the right part of Ing River. In the dry season, the local people went there for fishing, it was overcrowded and no one was able to control the situation. Another problem is that the water was getting low in every year. The Department of Fisheries decided to build the floodgate in 1939 and finished in 1941. However, it was flooded over the field, house, temple, and archaeological site, creating much damage. The natural swamps changed into large reservoirs. The Department of Fisheries established a fisheries research station at Phayao Lake to breed fish for the lake as part of the campaign to increase the availability of cheap protein diet for public consumption. Aquatic flora from Phayao Lake are used as animal feed. Phayao Lake is rich in natural resources that aid in providing the people of Phayao with a relatively comfortable life.

In the past, the area around Phayao Lake was the area where water from the mountains flowed into streams, rivers, and became small swamps during the dry season every year. The lessening of water makes the farmers able to use the area for farming, raise animals, and use as the route from the city to the surrounding villages of Phayao. The area of Phayao Lake was the urban area which had lot of temples before. Later, when the Department of Fisheries created a water gate in Phayao to keep water, the temple was submerged in the area.

By 2009, the lake had become a shallow, degraded water source. It was clogged with weeds. Sediment had decreased its depth. Fish stocks had dwindled. The Hydro and Agro Informatics Institute (HAII) and other agencies, inspired by King Bhumibol Adulyadej's emphasis on water management, stepped in to rejuvenate the lake. Dikes were built to trap sediment, unwanted weeds were removed and used for animal feed, and the lake was stocked with native fish. As a result, the water storage capacity of the lake increased by 370,000 cubic metres. As a result, water from the lake was able to provide for 16,500 nearby families and 43,785 rai (7,005.6 ha; 17,311 acres) of farmland.

== Geography ==
The land around the lake is very fertile. Communities around the river has existed since ancient time. The temperature of the area is ranges from 19.5 °C to 27.5 °C. The average rainfall per year is around 1,064 mm. There are 36 recorded different varieties of aquatic plants in Phayao Lake. The major underwater plants are Ceratophyllum demersum and Najas graminea while other plants mainly include Slavonia cucullata, Nelumbo nucifera, Eichhornia crassipes, and Scrirpus grossus. The estimated mass of fishing crop per hectare is approximately 159 kilograms. Humidity in the area ranges from 70 to 80 percent.

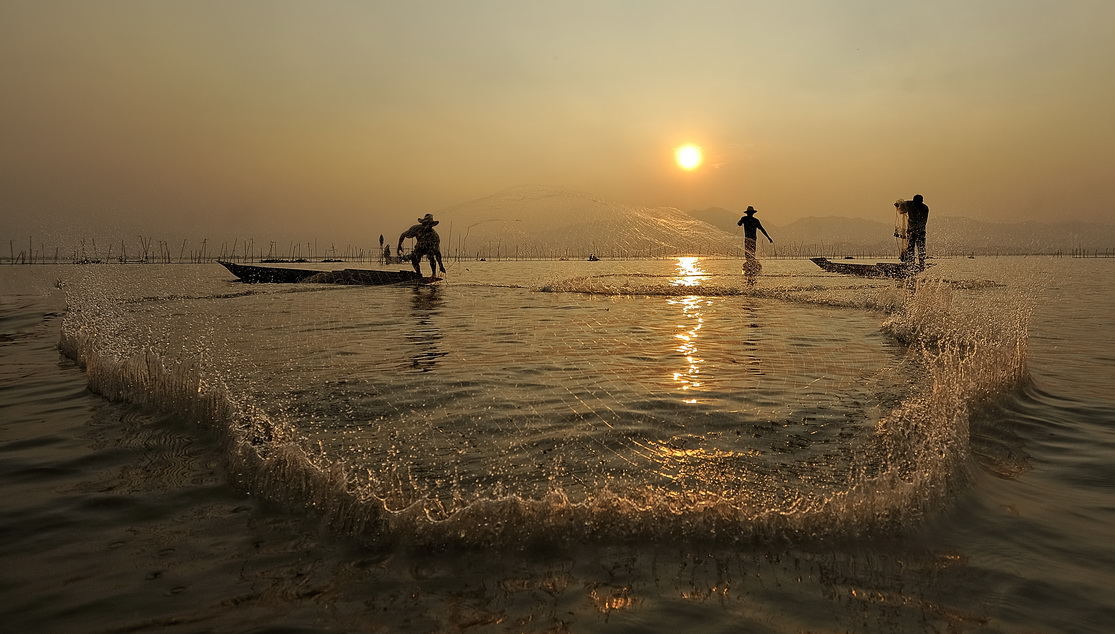
Kwan Phayao

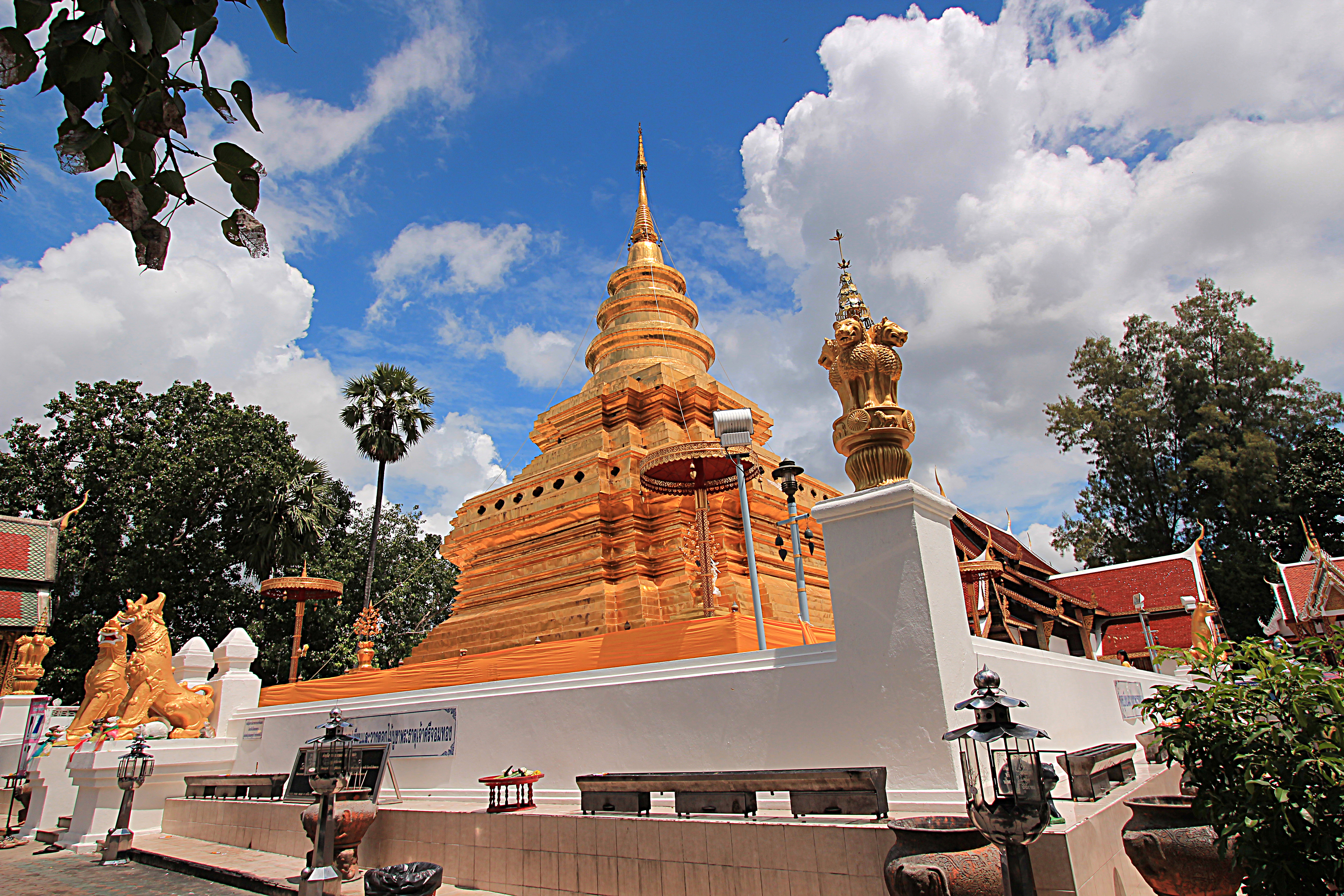
Wat Phra That Sri Chom Thong

== Fauna and flora ==
The estimated mass of fish harvest per hectare is approximately 159 kilograms. There are about 50 species of fish:
Iridescent shark (ปลาสวาย), cyprinid, common carp (ปลาไน), nile tilapia (ปลานิล), climbing perch (ปลาหมอ), striped snakehead (ปลาช่อน), great white sheatfish (ปลาค้าวขาว), bagrid catfish (ปลากด), clarias catfish (ปลาดุก), asian swamp eel (ปลาไหลนา), spotted featherback (ปลากราย), snake skin gourami (ปลาสลิด), moonlight gourami (ปลากระดี่นาง), minnow (ปลาซิว)

There are water hyacinths (ผักตบชวา), different types of grasses, duckweed, seaweed, lotus, and the chestnuts. The water hyacinth occupies about one-third of the area of Phayao Lake. The grasses are of different types: Johnson grass (หญ้าปล้อง) and Leucas aspera (หญ้าเค้านก) are seen in the dry season, when water decreases.

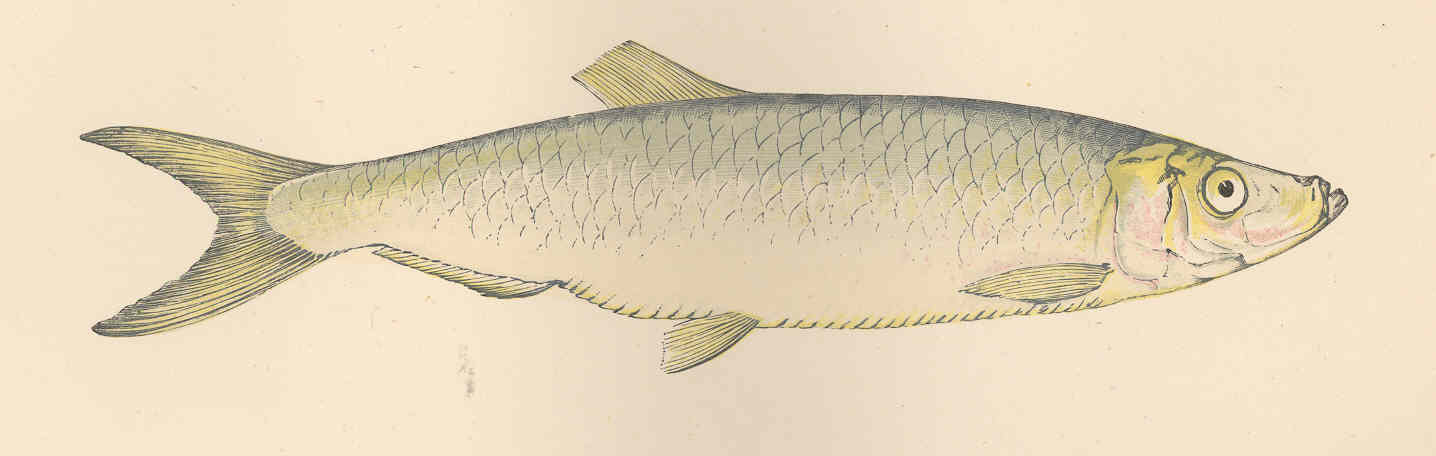
Whitebait

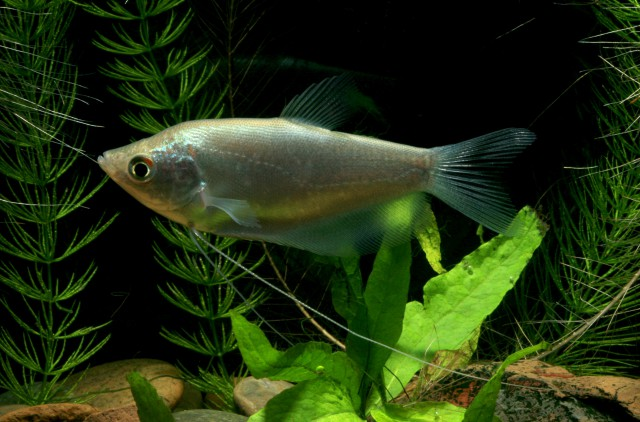
Moonlight gourami

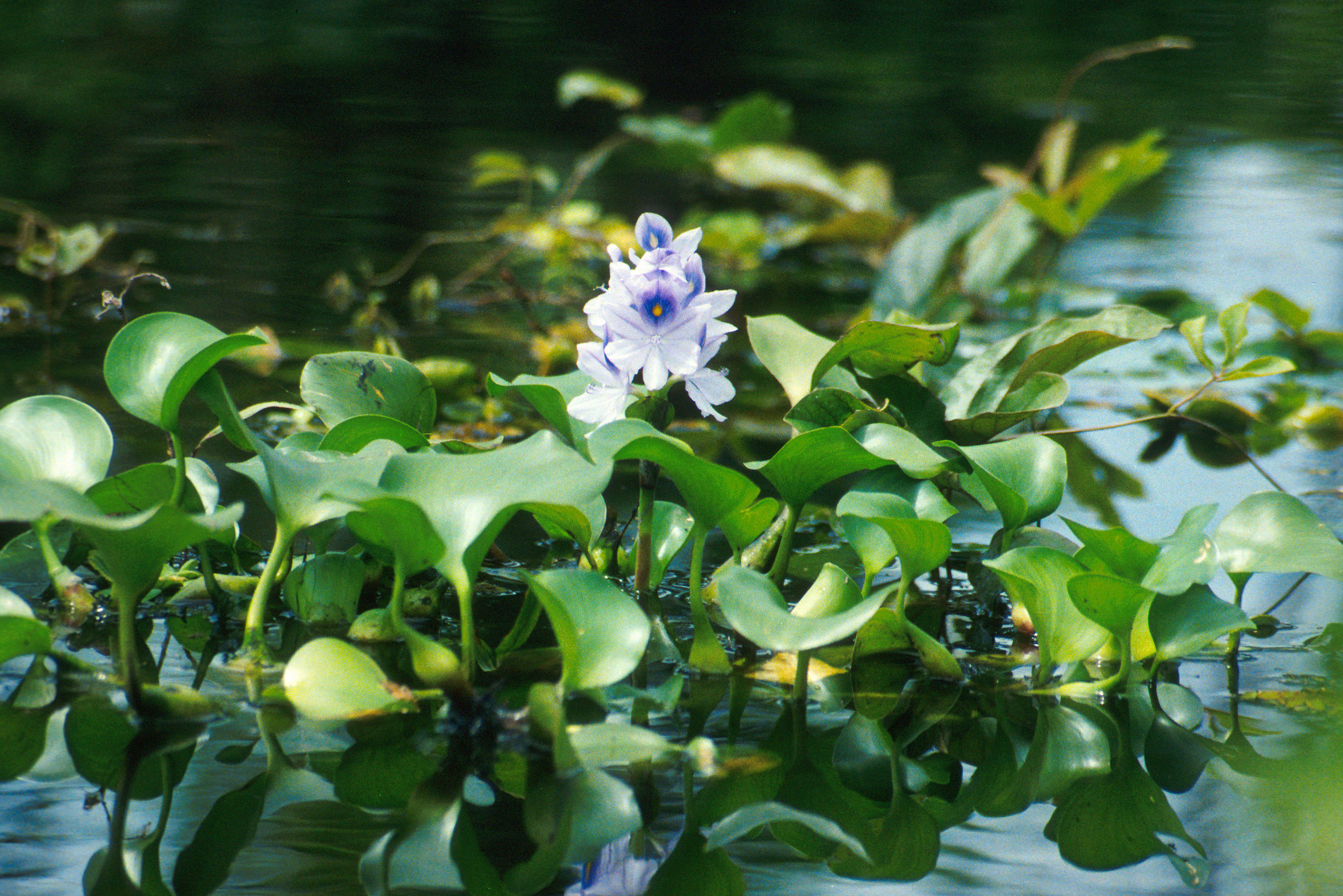
Water hyacinth
