= Mae Puem National Park =

National park in Thailand

- IUCN category II (national park)

- Park location in Thailand
- Location: Thailand
- Nearest city: Phayao
- Coordinates: 19.36°N 99.88°E
- Area: 356 km^{2} (137 sq mi)
- Established: 2009
- Governing body: Department of National Parks, Wildlife and Plant Conservation

Mae Puem National Park is a national park in Chiang Rai and Phayao provinces in Thailand. The park is home to mountains, rock formations and a reservoir.

== Geography ==
Protected areas of Chiang Rai province

Mae Puem National Park is in Chiang Rai and Phayao provinces. The park is about 20 km (12 mi) from Phayao. The park's area is 356 km^{2} (137 sq mi), of which 220 km^{2} (85 sq mi) is in Chiang Rai province and 136 km^{2} (53 sq mi) in Phayao province.

Park elevations range from 400 m (1,300 ft) to 900 m (3,000 ft). The Mae Puem and Mae Kaeo rivers originate in the park.

== Attractions ==
Doi Hua Ngom is the park's accessible high point. The Mae Peum reservoir is at the park's southern end. Phra Bat Tak Pha is a set of large rock formations.

== Flora ==
The park features dipterocarp, deciduous, evergreen and pine forests. Plant species include species of Afzelia, Dalbergia, Pterocarpus and Shorea.
