= Phayao =

Coordinates: 19°9′55″N 99°54′13″E

Phayao พะเยา ᩕᨻᨿᩣ᩠ᩅ
- Town
- เมืองพะเยา ᨾᩮᩬᩥᨦ ᩕᨻᨿᩣ᩠ᩅ
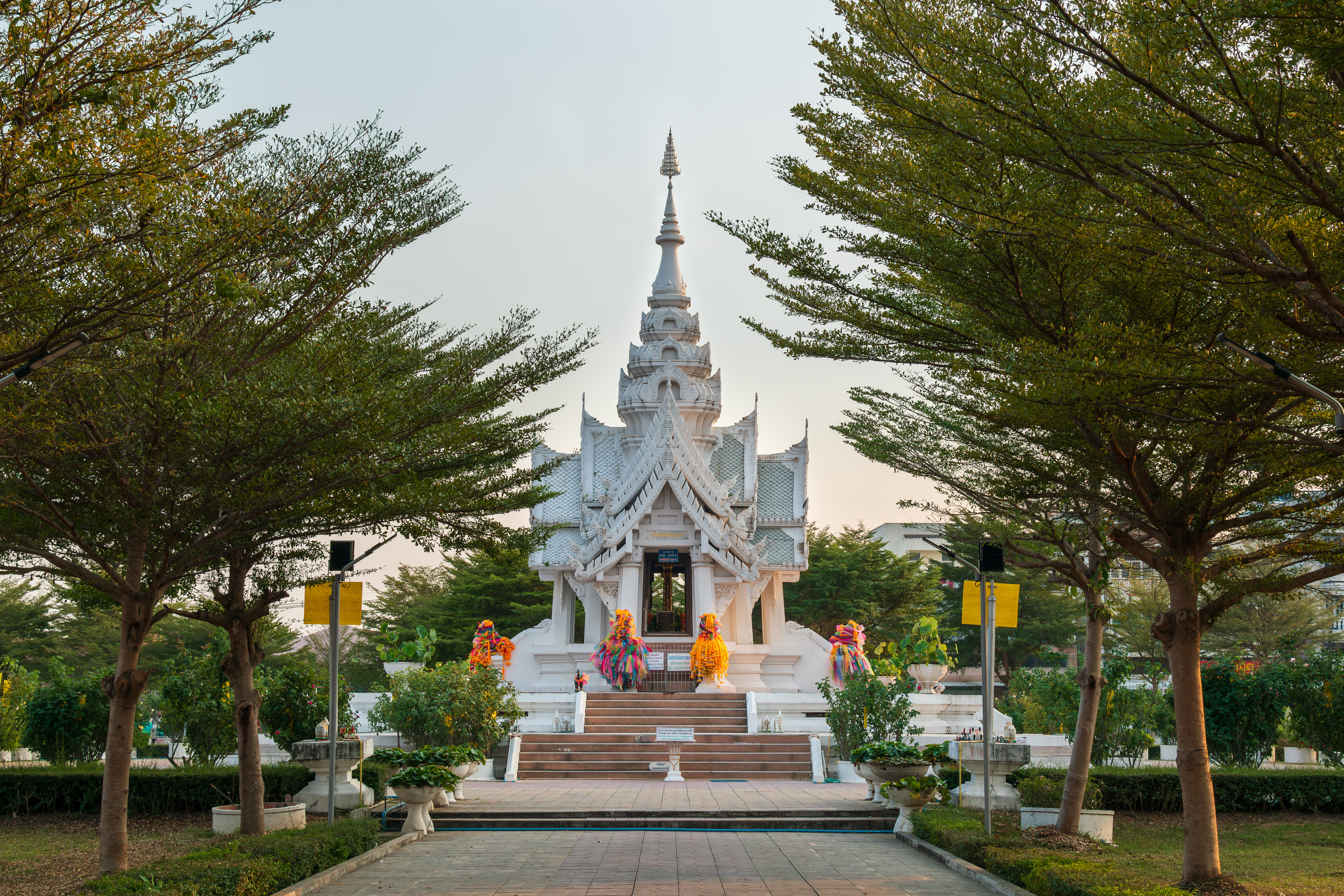
- Phayao city pillar shrine

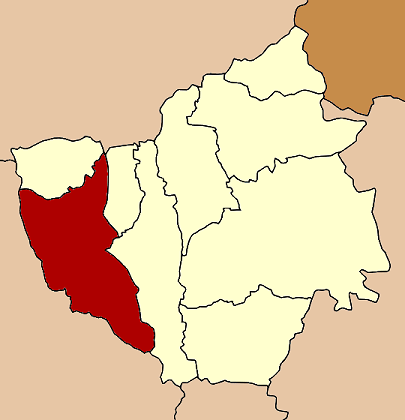
- Location in Phayao Province
- Country: Thailand
- Province: Phayao Province

Population (2005)
  - Total: 19,118
- Time zone: UTC+7 (ICT)
- Postal code: 56000
- Area code: 54

Phayao (Northern Thai: ᩕᨻᨿᩣ᩠ᩅ; Thai: พะเยา,Thai pronunciation: [pʰā.jāw]) is a city (thesaban mueang) in northern Thailand, capital of Phayao Province. For administrative purposes the city is divided into 15 sub-districts (tambons), which are further subdivided into 172 administrative villages.

Phayao
- "Phayao" in Thai language (top) and Northern Thai with Tai Tham script (bottom)

Thai name
- Thai: พะเยา
- RTGS: Phayao

Northern Thai name
- Northern Thai: ᩕᨻᨿᩣ᩠ᩅ (Phayuao)

The town is on the shore of the Phayao Lake. It dates back to the semi-independent city-state (mueang), founded between 900 and 1,000 years ago.

As of 2005 Phayao had a population of 19,118. Phayao lies 726 km north of Bangkok.

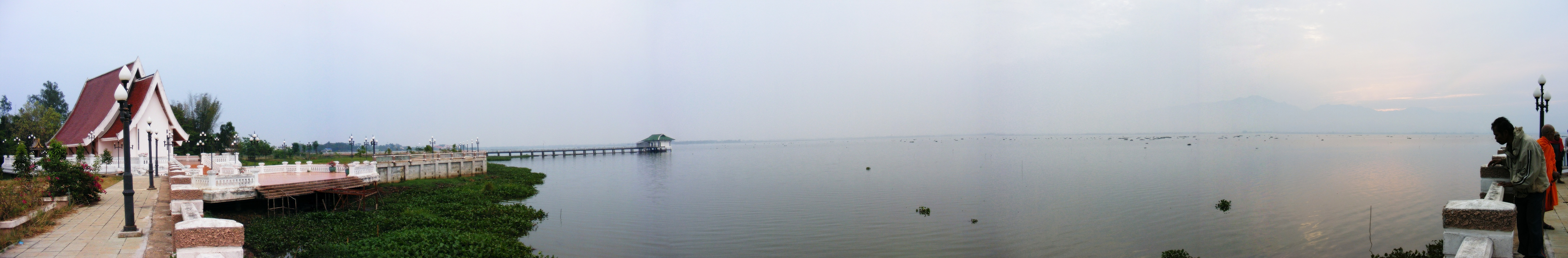
View of Phayao Lake

== Climate ==
Climate data for Phayao (1991–2020, extremes 1981-present)
Month	Jan	Feb	Mar	Apr	May	Jun	Jul	Aug	Sep	Oct	Nov	Dec	Year
Record high °C (°F)	34.3 (93.7)	37.1 (98.8)	39.7 (103.5)	42.0 (107.6)	41.7 (107.1)	40.0 (104.0)	37.2 (99.0)	35.6 (96.1)	35.2 (95.4)	36.7 (98.1)	34.6 (94.3)	33.6 (92.5)	42.0 (107.6)
Mean daily maximum °C (°F)	29.4 (84.9)	32.2 (90.0)	34.8 (94.6)	35.8 (96.4)	34.0 (93.2)	33.0 (91.4)	32.0 (89.6)	31.5 (88.7)	31.6 (88.9)	31.1 (88.0)	29.9 (85.8)	28.3 (82.9)	32.0 (89.5)
Daily mean °C (°F)	20.7 (69.3)	23.0 (73.4)	26.5 (79.7)	28.6 (83.5)	28.1 (82.6)	27.9 (82.2)	27.2 (81.0)	26.8 (80.2)	26.5 (79.7)	25.5 (77.9)	23.2 (73.8)	20.6 (69.1)	25.4 (77.7)
Mean daily minimum °C (°F)	14.2 (57.6)	15.6 (60.1)	19.4 (66.9)	22.9 (73.2)	23.7 (74.7)	24.1 (75.4)	23.8 (74.8)	23.5 (74.3)	23.1 (73.6)	21.7 (71.1)	18.3 (64.9)	14.9 (58.8)	20.4 (68.8)
Record low °C (°F)	6.0 (42.8)	7.0 (44.6)	8.5 (47.3)	16.0 (60.8)	17.0 (62.6)	21.3 (70.3)	20.6 (69.1)	20.6 (69.1)	18.7 (65.7)	12.6 (54.7)	6.9 (44.4)	2.5 (36.5)	2.5 (36.5)
Average precipitation mm (inches)	14.3 (0.56)	7.4 (0.29)	34.8 (1.37)	82.6 (3.25)	178.4 (7.02)	100.4 (3.95)	142.9 (5.63)	215.7 (8.49)	197.4 (7.77)	124.6 (4.91)	35.4 (1.39)	15.8 (0.62)	1,149.7 (45.26)
Average precipitation days (≥ 1.0 mm)	1.1	0.8	2.5	6.4	12.2	9.6	13.8	15.0	13.9	9.0	3.0	1.2	88.5
Average relative humidity (%)	76.0	66.8	60.9	64.2	74.2	77.3	80.3	83.3	84.3	83.9	81.3	79.6	76.0
Mean monthly sunshine hours	272.8	257.1	275.9	243.0	198.4	117.0	120.9	117.8	144.0	179.8	216.0	251.1	2,393.8
Mean daily sunshine hours	8.8	9.1	8.9	8.1	6.4	3.9	3.9	3.8	4.8	5.8	7.2	8.1	6.6
Source 1: World Meteorological Organization Feb–May record highs and lows 1951–2022;
Source 2: Office of Water Management and Hydrology, Royal Irrigation Department (sun 1981–2010) (extremes)
