= Phayao province =

Coordinates: 19°11′30″N 99°52′46″E

Phayao พะเยา ᩕᨻᨿᩣ᩠ᩅ
- Province
- จังหวัดพะเยา · ᨧᩢ᩠ᨦᩉ᩠ᩅᩢᩕᨻᨿᩣ᩠ᩅ
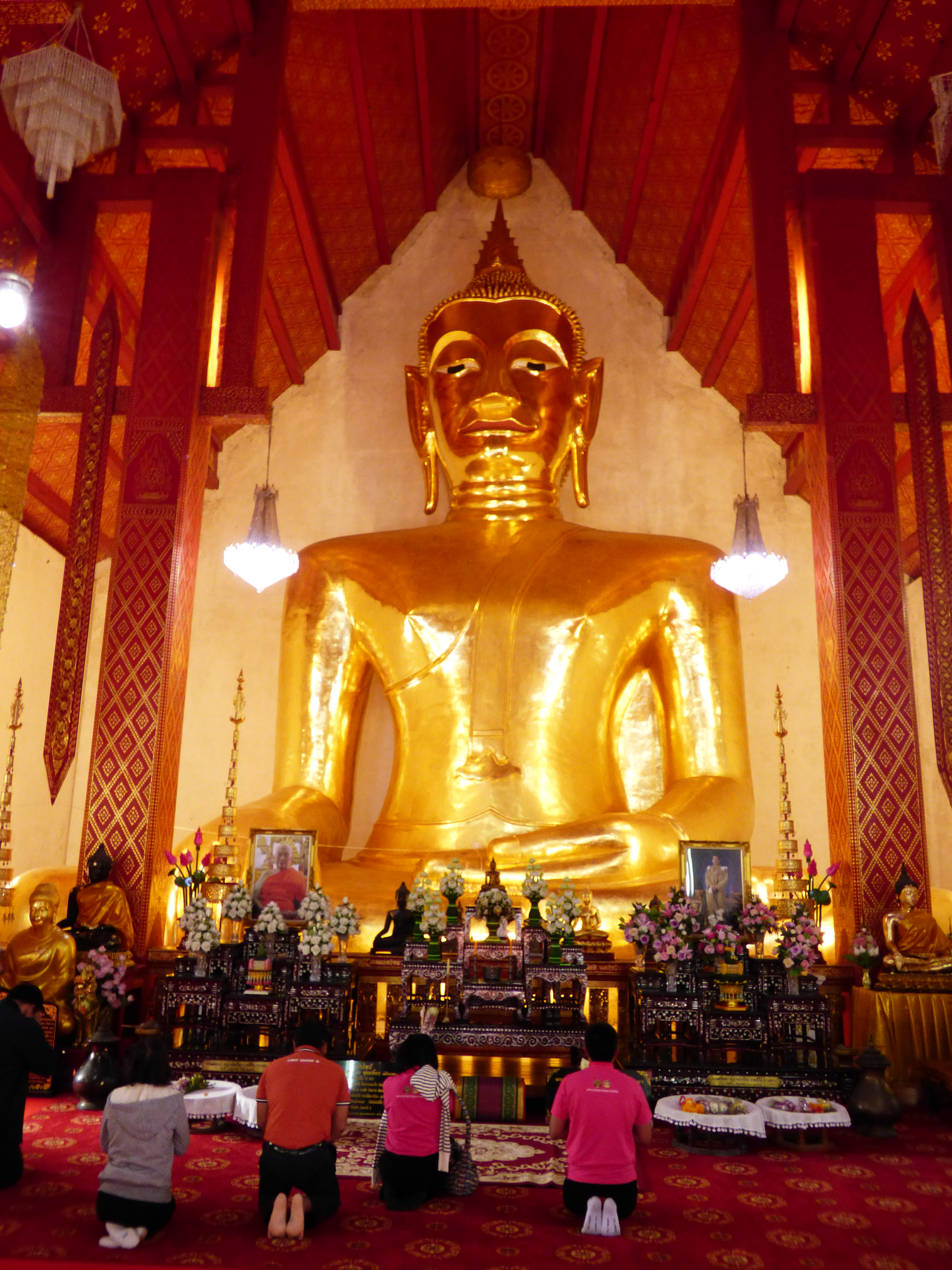
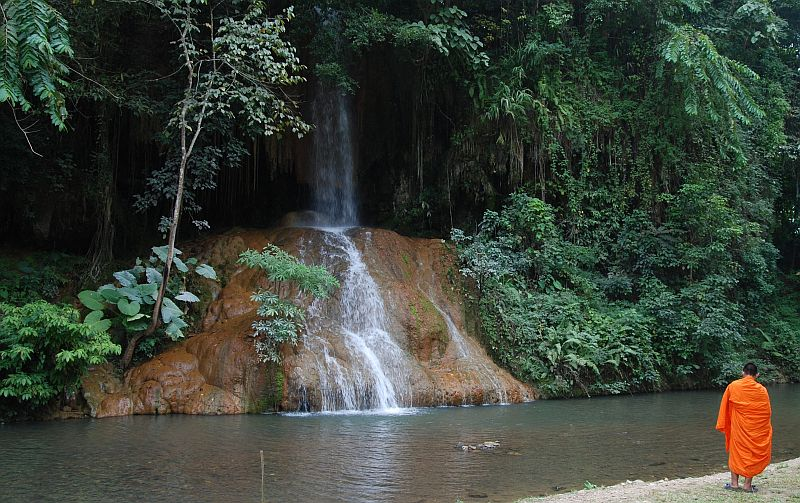
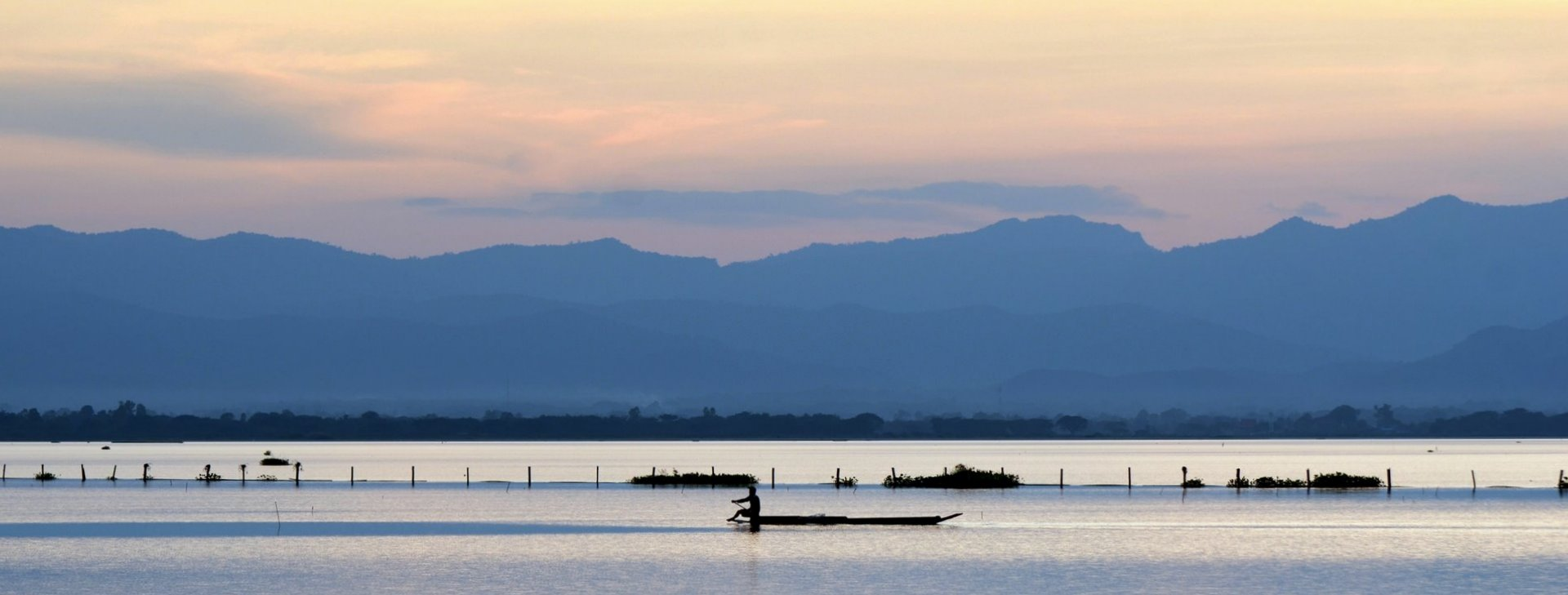
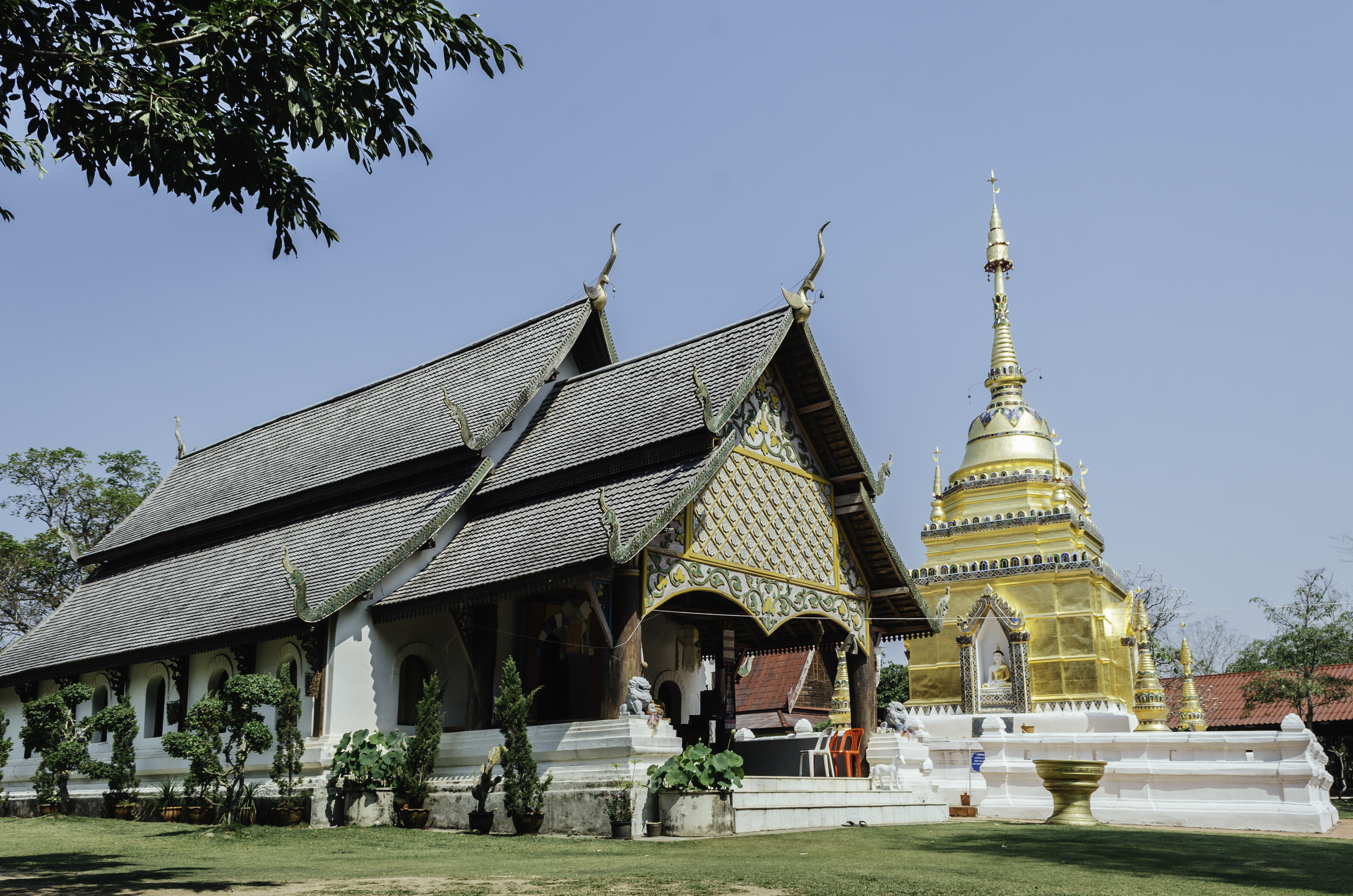
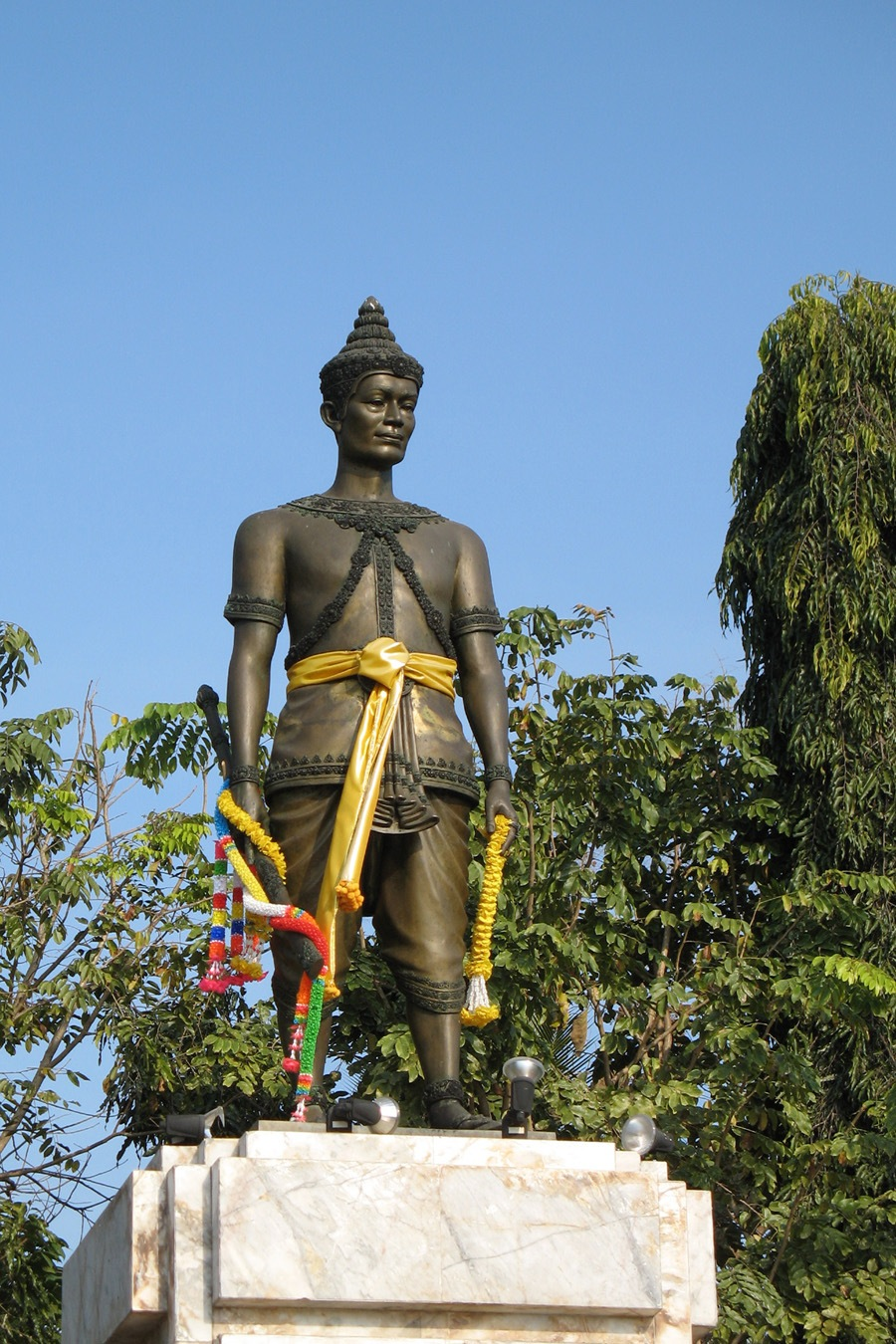
- From left to right, top to bottom : Wat Si Khom Kham, Phu Sang National Park, Phayao Lake, Wat Phra That Doi Yuak, Phaya Ngam Mueang Monument

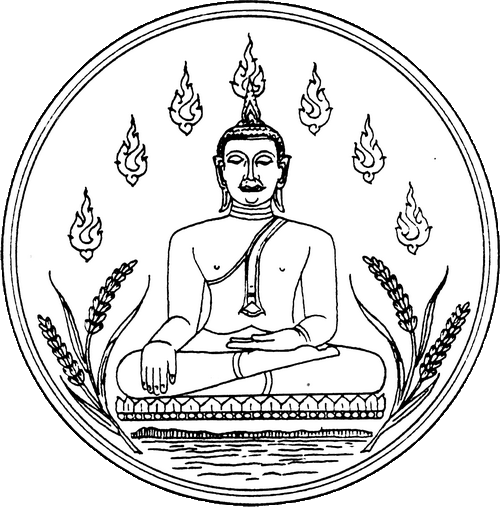
- Flag Seal
- Mottoes: กว๊านพะเยาแหล่งชีวิต ศักดิ์สิทธิ์พระเจ้าตนหลวง บวงสรวงพ่อขุนงำเมือง งามลือเลื่องดอยบุษราคัม ("Kwan Phayao lake, the source of life. Sacred Phra Chao Ton Luang. Worship Pho Khun Ngam Mueang. Famed Doi Busarakham.")
- Map of Thailand highlighting Phayao province
- Country: Thailand
- Capital: Phayao (town)

Government
  - Governor: Rattapol Naradisorn

Area
  - Total: 6,189 km^{2} (2,390 sq mi)
  - Rank: 35th

Population (2024)
  - Total: ▼454,764
  - Rank: 59th
  - Density: 74/km^{2} (190/sq mi)
  - Rank: 66th

Human Achievement Index
  - HAI (2022): 0.6598 "somewhat high" Ranked 14th

GDP
  - Total: baht 36 billion (US$1.2 billion) (2019)
- Time zone: UTC+7 (ICT)
- Postal code: 56xxx
- Calling code: 054
- ISO 3166 code: TH-56
- Website: phayao.go.th

Phayao Provincial Administrative Organization องค์การบริหารส่วนจังหวัดพะเยา
- Provincial Administrative Organization
- Interactive map of Phayao Provincial Administrative Organization

Government
  - Type: Local administrative divisions
  - Body: Phayao Provincial Administrative Organization
  - President: Thawat Suttawong
- Website: py-pao.go.th

Phayao province
- "Phayao" in Thai language (top) and Northern Thai with Tai Tham script (bottom)

Thai name
- Thai: พะเยา
- RTGS: Phayao

Northern Thai name
- Northern Thai: ᩕᨻᨿᩣ᩠ᩅ พะยาว (Phayuao)

Phayao (Thai: พะเยา, pronounced [pʰā.jāw]; Northern Thai: ᩕᨻᨿᩣ᩠ᩅ, pronounced [pʰā.ɲāːw]) is one of Thailand's seventy-seven provinces (changwat), and lies in upper northern Thailand. Neighboring provinces are (from the east clockwise) Nan, Phrae, Lampang, and Chiang Rai. To the northeast it borders Xaignabouli in Laos.

== Geography ==
The Phi Pan Nam Range runs across the province from north to south. The city of Phayao is on Phayao Lake (Kwan Phayao) in the valley of the Ing River. Three big mountains surround the valley, the Doi Luang (1,694 m), Doi Khun Mae Fat (1,550 m) and Doi Khun Mae Tam (1,330 m). The total forest area is 3,182 km^{2} (1,229 sq mi) or 51.4 percent of provincial area.

=== National parks ===
There are five national parks, of which four in region 15 (Chiang Rai) and Tham Sakoen in region 13 (Phrae), they are the protected areas in Phayao province. (Visitors in fiscal year 2024)

Doi Luang National Park	1,169 km^{2} (451 sq mi)	(29,179)
Doi Phu Nang National Park	860 km^{2} (330 sq mi)	(14,344)
Mae Puem National Park	351 km^{2} (136 sq mi)	(35,626)
Phu Sang National Park	285 km^{2} (110 sq mi)	(66,868)
Tham Sakoen National Park	250 km^{2} (97 sq mi)	(5,224)

=== Wildlife sanctuaries ===
There are two wildlife sanctuaries in region 15 (Chiang Rai) and they are the protected areas in Phayao province.

Doi Pha Chang Wildlife Sanctuary	571 km^{2} (220 sq mi)
Wiang Lo Wildlife Sanctuary	371 km^{2} (143 sq mi)

=== Location protected areas ===
Overview of protected areas of Phayao

Phayao protected areas

	National park
1	Doi Luang
2	Doi Phu Nang
3	Mae Puem
4	Phu Sang
5	Tham Sakoen

	Wildlife sanctuary
6	Doi Pha Chang
7	Wiang Lo

== History ==
Phayao was founded in the 11th century as a small kingdom which quickly expanded to encompass territories in what is now Chiang Rai, Phrae, Lampang, and Nan. In the 13th century it gained enough importance to be an equal partner with King Mangrai of Lan Na and the Sukhothai kingdom. It was later attacked by Lan Na and Nan Kingdom in 1338 then annexed as part of Lan Na. During the Burmese rule of Lanna, the city was deserted.

In 1843, in the reign of King Rama III, Phayao was re-established along with Chiang Rai and Muang Ngao to be a frontier city against the Burmese army located at Chiang Saen. In 1897 it became part of the province of Chiang Rai. On 28 August 1977, Phayao was separated from Chiang Rai and became a province of its own.

== Symbols ==
The provincial seal shows Buddha, representing the famous Buddha image in the temple Wat Si Khom Kham called Phra Chao Ton Luang. Behind him are seven flames showing the glory of Buddha. In front of Buddha is a bowl and two ears of rice.

The provincial tree is Mammea siamensis. The Mekong giant catfish (Pangasianodon gigas) is the provincial aquatic life.

== Administration ==
Map of nine districts

=== Provincial government ===
The province is subdivided into nine districts (amphoe). These are further divided into 68 subdistricts (tambon) and 632 villages (muban).

1. Mueang Phayao
2. Chun
3. Chiang Kham
4. Chiang Muan
5. Dok Khamtai
6. Pong
7. Mae Chai
8. Phu Sang
9. Phu Kamyao

=== Local government ===
As of 26 November 2019 there are: one Phayao Provincial Administration Organisation (ongkan borihan suan changwat) and 35 municipal (thesaban) areas in the province. Phayao and Dok Khamtai have town (thesaban mueang) status. Further 33 subdistrict municipalities (thesaban tambon). The non-municipal areas are administered by 36 Subdistrict Administrative Organisations - SAO (ongkan borihan suan tambon).

== Tourism ==
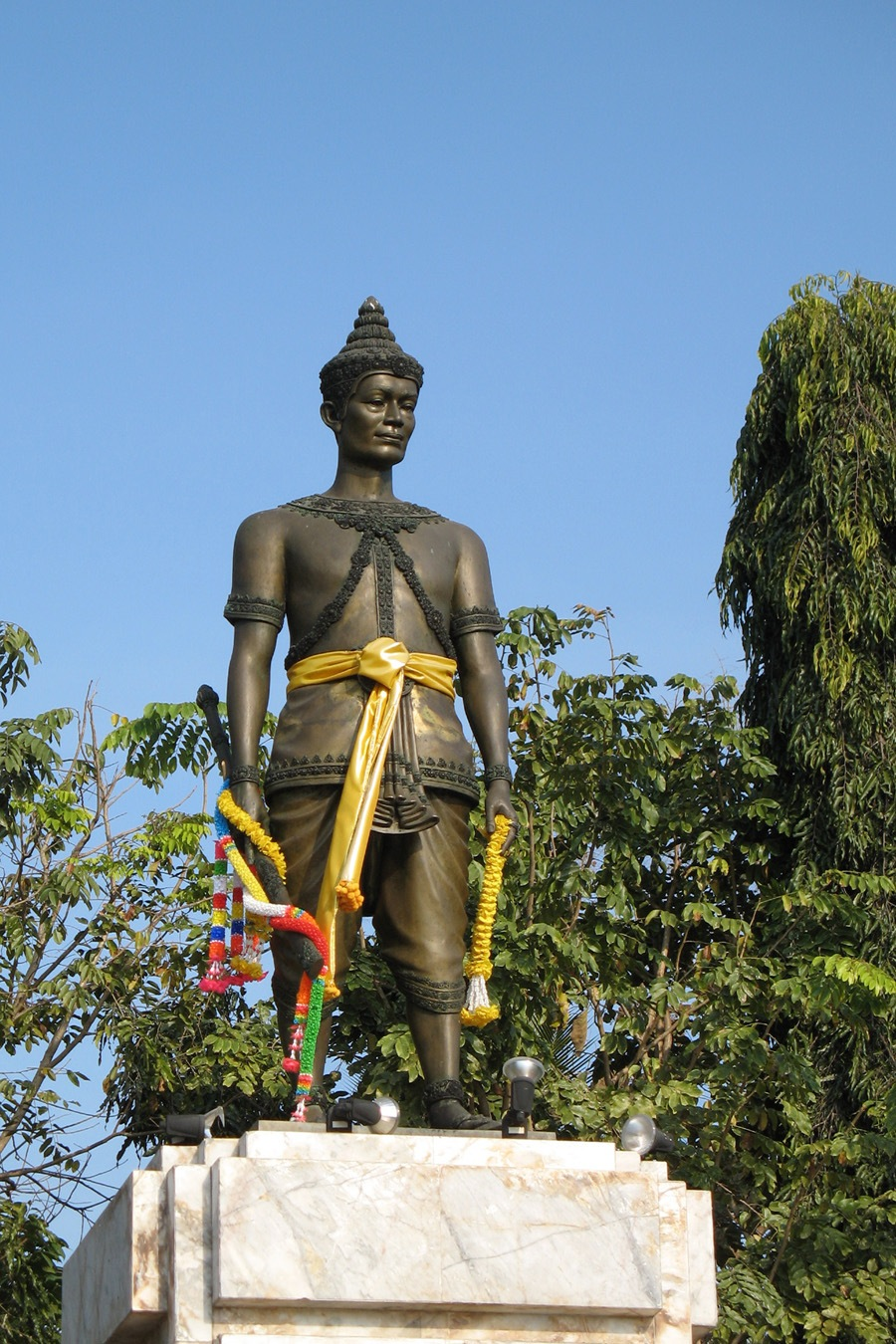
King Ngam Mueang Monument, Phayao Lake

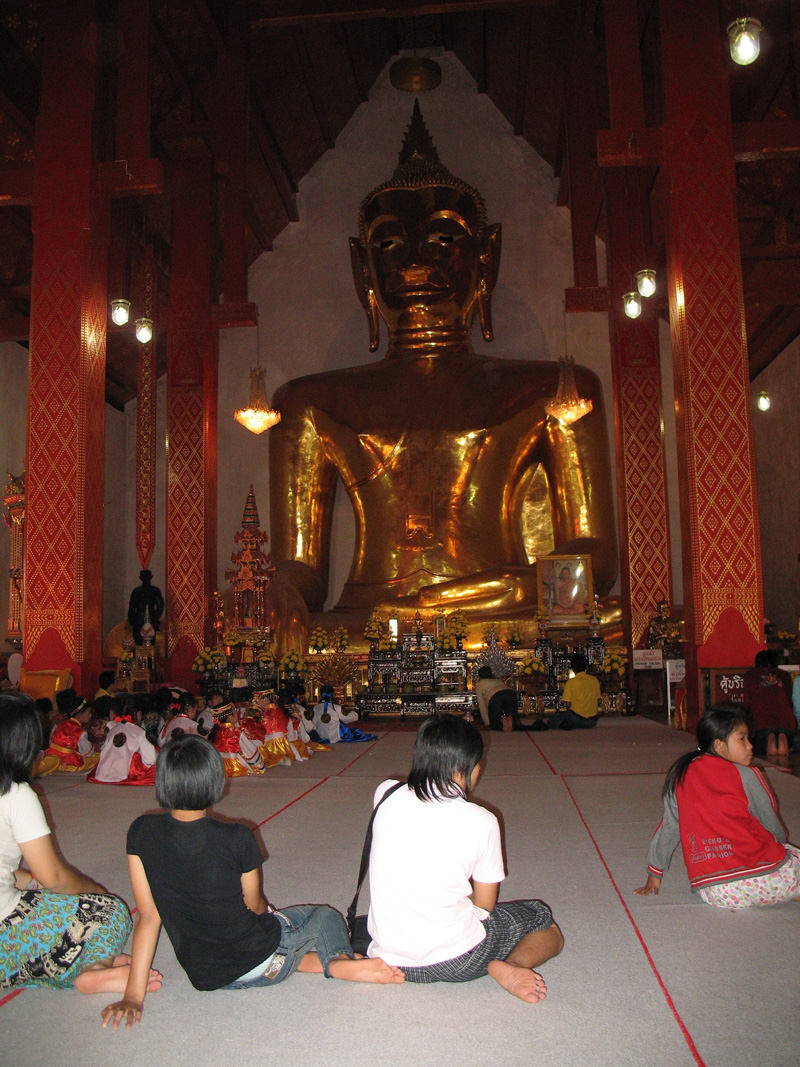
Phra Chao Ton Luang, Wat Si Khom Kham

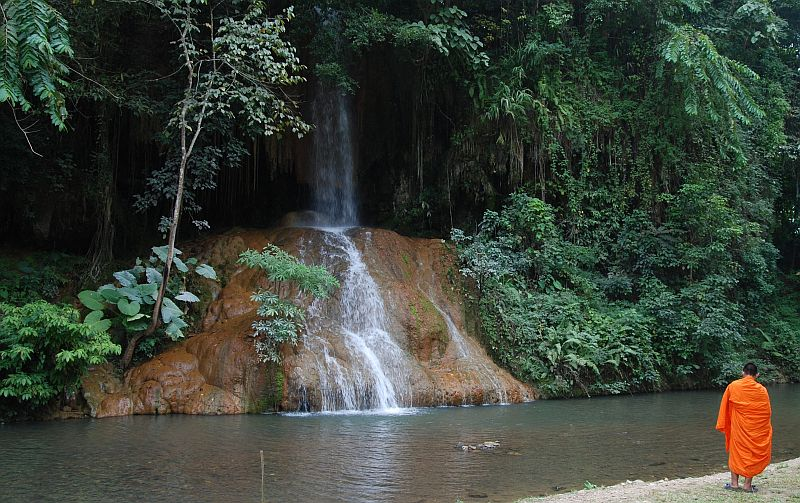
Phu Sang waterfall

=== Sights ===
An extensive fresh-water lake, Kwan Phayao (กว๊านพะเยา) is the largest fresh-water fish habitat in the upper north which provides the livelihood of many of the local people. To protect the lake from pollution, motor boats are not allowed on the lake.

The Pho Khun Ngam Mueang Memorial (อนุสาวรีย์พ่อขุนงำเมือง) commemorates a former king of Phayao, or Phu Kam Yao, who was in power some 700 years ago. During his reign, the state prospered and expanded its territory.

Wat Si Khom Kham (วัดศรีโคมคำ) It houses the largest Buddha statue of Lanna Thai, Phra Chao Ton Luang, a sitting Buddha with a lap width of 16 meters and height of 18 meters. It is said that it took no fewer than 33 years to complete.

Ho Watanatham Nithat (หอวัฒนธรรมนิทัศน์). The indigenous museum deals with the history and ancient relics of Phayao, including native culture and traditions and creativity.

Wat Lee or Wiang Phayao Museum (พิพิธภัณฑ์เวียงพยาว (วัดลี)) Wat Lee is a Buddhist Temple which contains local history of Phayao. The museum contains more than 5000 pieces of historical object such as Sandstone Buddha Figure, 500 year-old sandstone inscriptions, palm leaf manuscripts and the local pottery.

Kwan Phayao Pavilion and the Phayao Fresh-water Fishery Station (พระตำหนักกว๊านพะเยาและศูนย์วิจัยและพัฒนาประมงน้ำจืดพะเยา) is the first facility in the world to successfully breed pla buk, the Mekong giant catfish. There is an aquarium displaying many species of fish and water plants.

The Chiang Saen-style Chedi at Wat Si Umong Kham (วัดศรีอุโมงคำ) is still in good condition. The Lanna-style Buddha statue, Phra Chao Lan Tu (พระเจ้าล้านตื้อ), is regarded as the most beautiful anywhere.

Wat Phra That Chomthong (วัดพระธาตุจอมทอง) Surrounded by an arboretum, the temple offers a panoramic view of the town and the lake.

Wat Analyo (วัดอนาลโย) Covers an extensive area, being cool and shady under leafy canopies of large trees it features buildings and sculptures of religion-based characters by contemporary craftsmen of good skill.

Namtok Champa Thong (น้ำตกจำปาทอง) is a scenic and tall waterfall amid natural surroundings.

Ban Tham Indigenous Cultural Centre (ศูนย์วัฒนธรรมพื้นบ้านบ้านถ้ำ) It has a large collection of native agricultural tools and implements as well as ancient objects from which the cultural lifestyle of the Lanna people in the past can be studied.

Doi Phu Nang National Park (อุทยานแห่งชาติดอยภูนาง) A variety of birds are found, especially peacocks which come to the park area for breeding from January to March. The park also has a scenic waterfall called Namtok Than Sawan.

Chiang Kham (เชียงคำ) is home to many Thai Lue people. An interesting temple in Chiang Kham is Wat Nantaram (วัดนันตาราม), a Burmese-style site built entirely with teak. Another place of interest is Wat Phra That Sop Waen (วัดพระธาตุสบแวน) with its 700-year-old Lanna-style chedi.

Namtok Phu Sang (น้ำตกภูซาง) It is fed by a hot spring on the mountain which flows into the brook before cascading over the falls.

Phu Lang Ka Forest Park is in Chiang Kham District and Pong District. It is around 900–1,720 metres above sea level. The main attractions are: Doi Hua Ling, Doi Phu Lang Ka and Doi Phu Nom.

=== Local products ===
Products made from water hyacinths. Hand-made cotton (ผ้าฝ้ายทอมือ) is a handicraft of the Thai Lue people.

== Culture ==
Religion in Phayao (2015)
Religion	Percent
Buddhism	97.90%
Christianity	0.80%
Unaffiliated/Others	1.30%

=== Festivals ===
Sacrificial Combined Force 2324 Monument Fair (งานฉลองอนุสรณ์ผู้เสียสละพลเรือน ตำรวจ ทหาร 2324) is held annually at the end of January until the beginning of February at the memorial near the Chiang Kham Airport, Tambon Chiang Ban, Amphoe Chiang Kham. It is a merit making ceremony dedicated to the civilians, policemen, and soldiers, who died in their fighting with communist insurgents in 1980-early 1981 (2523-early 2524 B.E.). It is a charity fair to raise money to assist the descendants of the deceased. Other activities include games, performances, exhibitions and various booths of the governmental authorities.

Winter and Red Cross Fair (งานฤดูหนาวและงานกาชาด) is held at the end of December until the beginning of January every year at the ground near the Phayao Bus Terminal. In the event, there is a fair full of booths from the governmental and private authorities, contests, as well as, various games.

Cassie Flower Blooming Day (งานวันดอกคำใต้บาน) takes place on 14 February every year at the ground in front of the Dok Khamtai District Office. Activities are handicraft contests and sales of souvenirs.

Pho khun Ngam Mueang Fair (งานบวงสรวงพ่อขุนงำเมือง) on 5 March every year at the Pho khun Ngam Mueang Monument with a procession of the worship offerings.

Thai Lue Cultural Festival (งานสืบสานตำนานไทลื้อ) happens at the beginning of March every year at the Wat Phrathat Sop Waen, Amphoe Chiang Kham, consisting of folk games, cultural performances, as well as, the lifestyle of the Thai Lue people. At the event, people will dress up in the traditional costume. Also, there will be a cotton spinning demonstration, dessert making, Lue singing, Choeng or martial arts dance, and Makon game.

Songkran Festival (Pi Mai Mueang) (งานประเพณีสงกรานต์-ปี๋ใหม่เมือง) is held during 13–16 April every year behind the Mueang Phayao Municipality and in every district.

Pu Cha Phaya Lo Fair (Bucha Phra Lo) (ประเพณีปู่จาพญาลอ-บูชาพระลอ) is held on 9 April every year at Wiang Lo Ancient Town, Ban Huai Ngio, Amphoe Chun, with an aim to pay respect to the Wiang Lo ancestors and to create folk consciousness to cherish and preserve the site. In the event, there are parades, light and sound presentations, a procession inviting the spirits of Wiang Lo's past kings, khantok dinner at night, as well as cultural performances.

Phayao Lychee and Quality Products Fair (งานเทศกาลลิ้นจี่ และของดีเมืองพะเยา) takes place in May every year at the ground behind the Mueang Phayao Municipality. In the event, there are fairs offering lychees and quality products of Phayao and a lychee beauty pageant.

Sky Rocket Festival (งานทำบุญบั้งไฟ) is held in June every year at Tambon Ang Thong, Amphoe Chiang Kham. In the festival, there is a traditional dance procession and sky rocket contest.

Candle Procession Festival (งานแห่เทียนพรรษา) takes place one day before the Buddhist Lent Day at the ground behind the municipality office and in every district. Beautifully engraved candles are brought to participate in the parade. Various cultural shows are performed, as well as, the contest for the most beautiful candle is organized. After the contest, all the candles are offered to the temples.

Hilltribe Traditional Festival (งานประเพณีชาวเขา) is held in December every year at Tambon Rom Yen, Amphoe Chiang Kham. Traditional dances and games of the hill tribe people, which are a winter tradition, are performed.

== Human achievement index 2022 ==
Health	Education	Employment	Income
71	43	29	20
Housing	Family	Transport	Participation
27	43	40	4
Province Phayao, with an HAI 2022 value of 0.6598 is "somewhat high", occupies place 14 in the ranking.

Since 2003, United Nations Development Programme (UNDP) in Thailand has tracked progress on human development at sub-national level using the Human achievement index (HAI), a composite index covering all the eight key areas of human development. National Economic and Social Development Board (NESDB) has taken over this task since 2017.

Rank	Classification
1 - 13	"high"
14 - 29	"somewhat high"
30 - 45	"average"
46 - 61	"somewhat low"
62 - 77	"low"

Map with provinces and HAI 2022 rankings

== Gallery ==
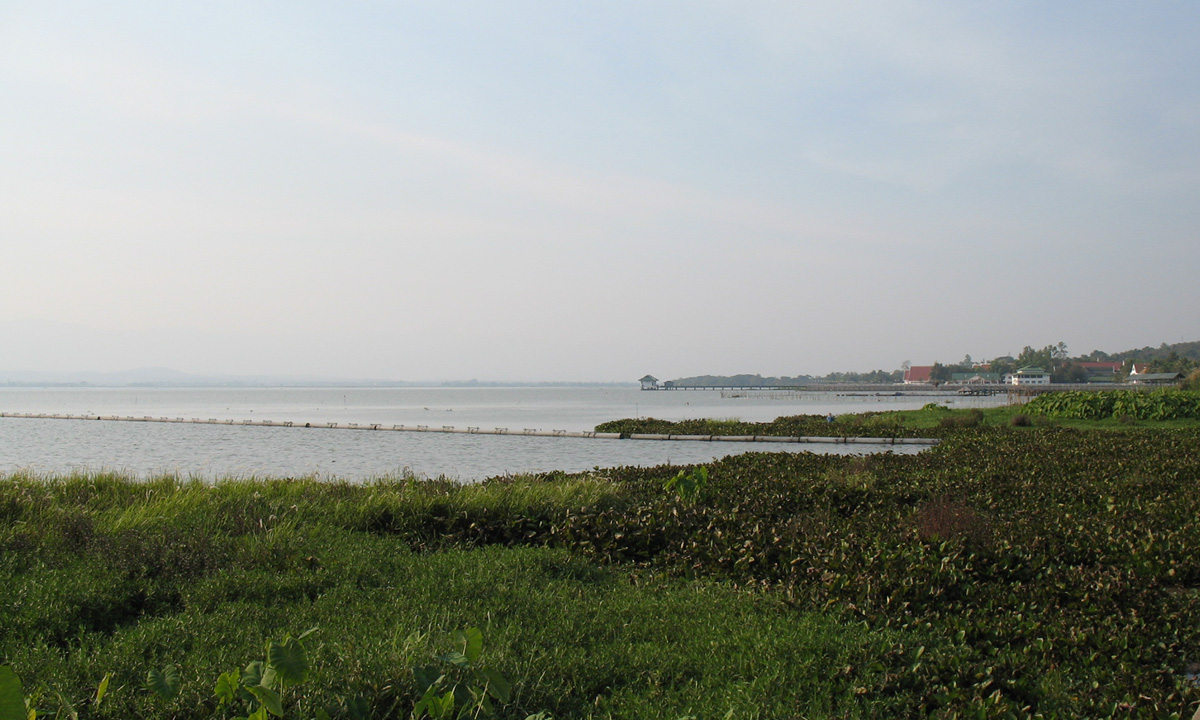
Phayao Lake

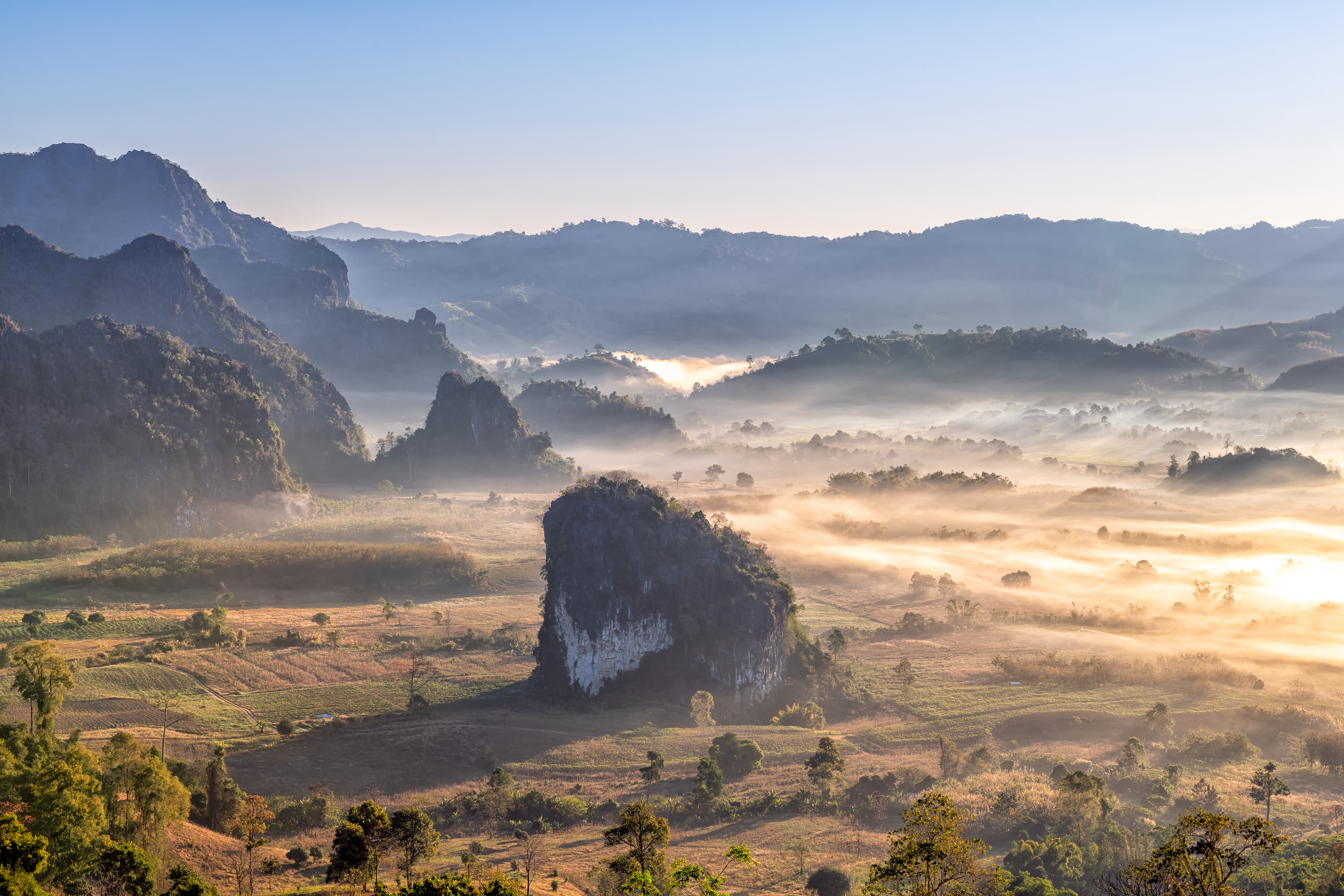
Tham Sa Koen National Park

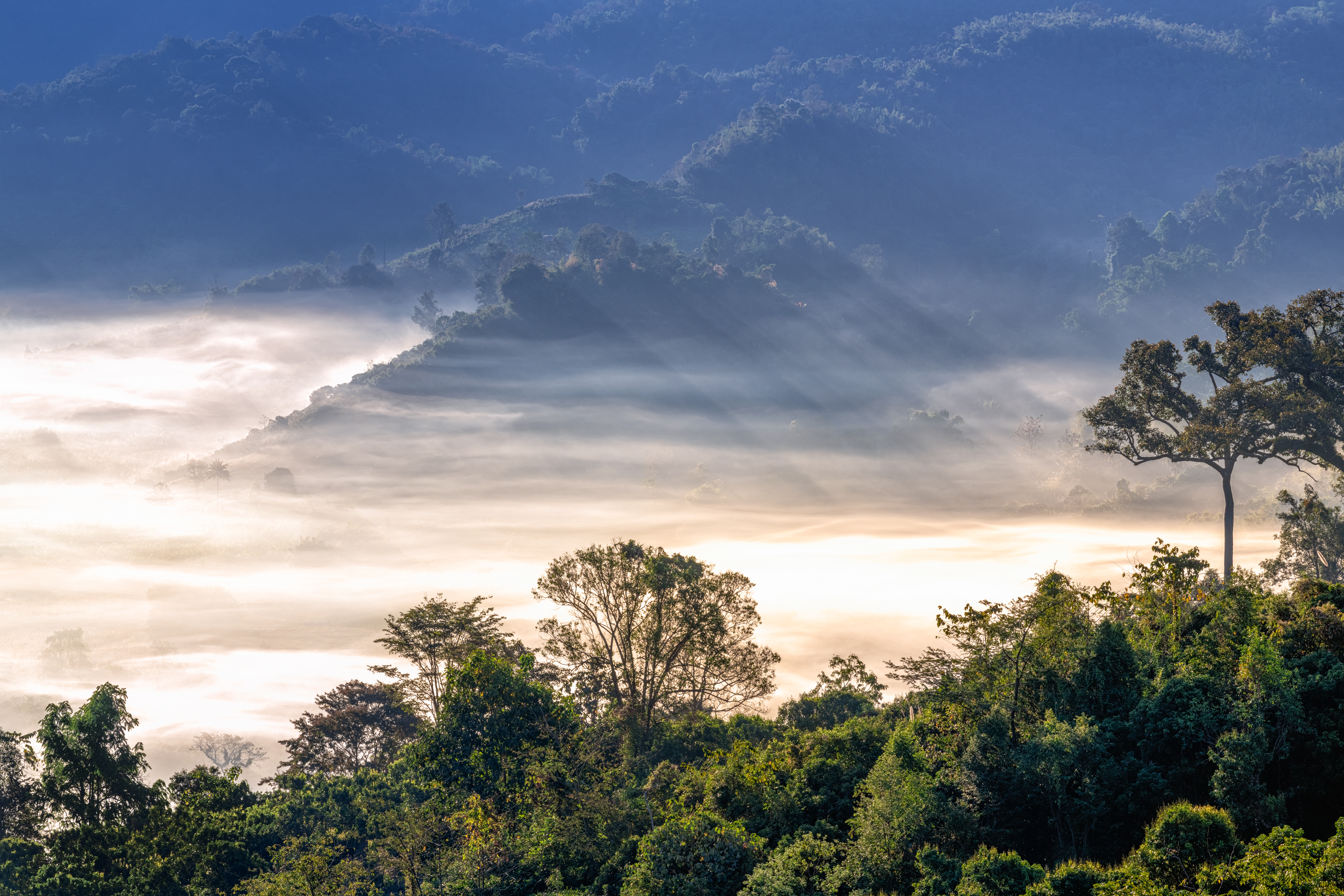
Tham Sa Koen National Park
