= Lam Wa =

- Native name: ลำน้ำว้า (Thai)

Location
- Country: Thailand
- State: Nan Province
- District: Bo Kluea, Santi Suk, Mae Charim, Wiang Sa

Physical characteristics
- Source: Doi Phi Pan Nam
  - location: Luang Prabang Range, Bo Kluea District, Nan Province, Thailand
  - coordinates: 19°09′45″N 101°13′45″E
  - elevation: 1,600 m (5,200 ft)
- Mouth: Nan River
  - location: Khueng, Wiang Sa District, Nan Province
  - coordinates: 18°33′40″N 100°45′49″E
  - elevation: 182 m (597 ft)

Lam Nam Wa (Thai: ลำน้ำว้า) is a watercourse of the Thai highlands in Thailand, and a tributary of the Nan River, part of the Chao Phraya River basin. It has its source beneath the 1,745-metre (5,725 ft) high Doi Phi Pan Nam mountain of the Luang Prabang Range. It joins the Nan River near Wiang Sa town in Wiang Sa District, Nan Province.

Lam Nam Wa is a popular watercourse for white water rafting.

== See also ==
- List of whitewater rivers
