= Pha Sing =

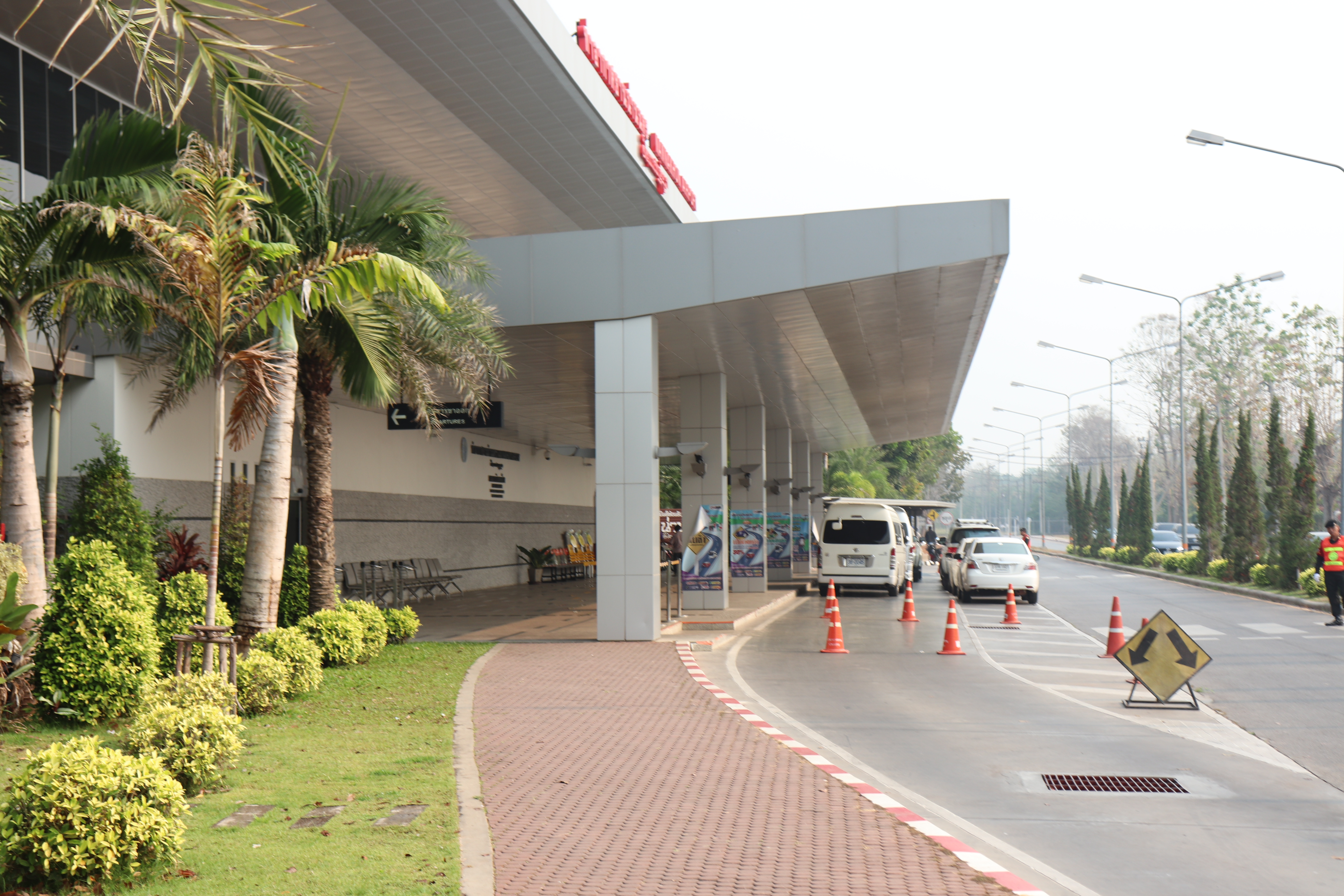
Nan air port pick-up drop off area

Pha Sing (Thai: ผาสิงห์; Lanna:) is a tambon (subdistrict) of Mueang Nan District, Nan Province, Thailand, located in the north of the district. In 2012 it had a total population of 6,294 people, and an area of 87 km^{2}.

== Location ==
- North: adjacent to Bo Subdistrict, Mueang Nan District
- East: adjacent to Mueang Chang Subdistrict, and Fai Kaeo Subdistrict, Phu Phiang District.
- South: adjacent to Nai Wiang Subdistrict, Mueang Nan District.
- West: adjacent to Chai Sathan Subdistrict, Thuem Tong Subdistrict, and Sanian Subdistrict, Mueang Nan District.

== Administrative Divisions ==
=== Regional Governance ===
Divided into 9 administrative villages:

- Village No. 1 Ban Phatup
- Village No. 2 Ban Huai Som Poi
- Village No. 3 Ban Suan Hom
- Village No. 4 Ban Phasing
- Village No. 5 Ban Tung Setthi
- Village No. 6 Mongkhonnimit Village
- Village No. 7 Ban Phatup
- Village No. 8 Ban Don Sawan
- Village No. 9 Ban Fa Mai

=== Local Government ===
Divided into 1 municipality and 1 sub-district administrative organization, namely

- Nan Municipality covers 3 villages: Ban Suan Hom Village No. 3, Ban Don Sawan Village No. 8, and Ban Fa Mai Village No. 9.
- Phasing Subdistrict Administrative Organization covers the remaining villages.

== Important Places ==
- Nan Nakhon Airport
- Nan Provincial Central Stadium
- Nan Highway District 2
- Nan Veterans Affairs Office
- Nan Provincial Election Commission Office
- Pha Sing Subdistrict Administrative Organization Office
- 324th Border Patrol Police Company
- Nan Provincial Labor Skill Development Center
- Nan Horticultural Experiment Station
- Chulalongkorn University Academic Learning and Service Center
- Air Force Radio Station, Nan Province
- Pha Sing Subdistrict Health Promoting Hospital, Ban Phatup
- Tham Pha Tub Forest Park
