= Bo Suak =

Coordinates: 18°44′17.6″N 100°41′03.5″E

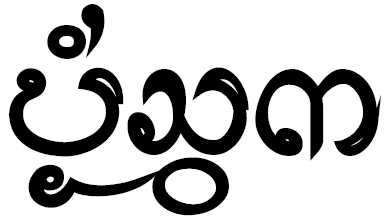
Bo Suak (Thai: บ่อสวก; Lanna: ) is a tambon (subdistrict) of Mueang Nan District, Nan Province, northern Thailand. In 2018 it had a total population of 6,579 people.

== History ==
Bo Suak has a history of more than 750 years, it was a border town of the eastern Lanna Kingdom. There is a folklore that here was the residence of the Lua people, and it is a location of sacred salt well called "Bo Suak" (refers to "salt"). Currently, it is located in the middle of the rice fields, divided into two wells are Bo Kluea Nuea (บ่อเกลือเหนือ) and Bo Kluea Tai (บ่อเกลือใต้).

In the year 1999, there were excavations found in seven ancient pottery kilns at the house of a local noncommissioned policeman. The kilns face Chao Phraya River for transport conveniently. They are the same era potteries as the Sangkhalok ceramic ware of Sukhothai Kingdom.

Originally, the area was called just "Suak". It was renamed Bo Suak in 2010 for auspiciousness.

== Geography ==
Bo Suak has a total area of 61.510 km^{2} (23.74914 mi^{²}).

Neighboring tambons are (from the north clockwise): Rueang, Chai Sathan, and Du Tai, Na Sao, and Mae Khaning of Wiang Sa District.

== Administration ==
=== Central administration ===
The tambon is subdivided into ten administrative mubans (villages)

No.	Name	Thai
1.	Ban Bo Suak	บ้านบ่อสวก
2.	Ban Pa Kha	บ้านป่าคา
3.	Ban Muang Charoen Rat	บ้านม่วงเจริญราษฎร์
4.	Ban Chiang Yuen	บ้านเชียงยืน
5.	Ban Sao Luang	บ้านซาวหลวง
6.	Ban Tam	บ้านต้าม
7.	Ban Na Mon	บ้านนามน
8.	Ban Nong Tom	บ้านหนองโตม
9.	ฺBan Don Udom	บ้านดอนอุดม
10.	Ban Suak Phatthana	บ้านสวกพัฒนา

=== Local administration ===
The area of the tambon is shared by local government.

- the subdistrict administrative organization (SAO) Bo Suak (องค์การบริหารส่วนตำบลบ่อสวก)

== Local products ==
- Pottery
- Traditional hand-woven fabric
- Earthen steamer
