= Chiang Muan district =

Chiang Muan เชียงม่วน
- District
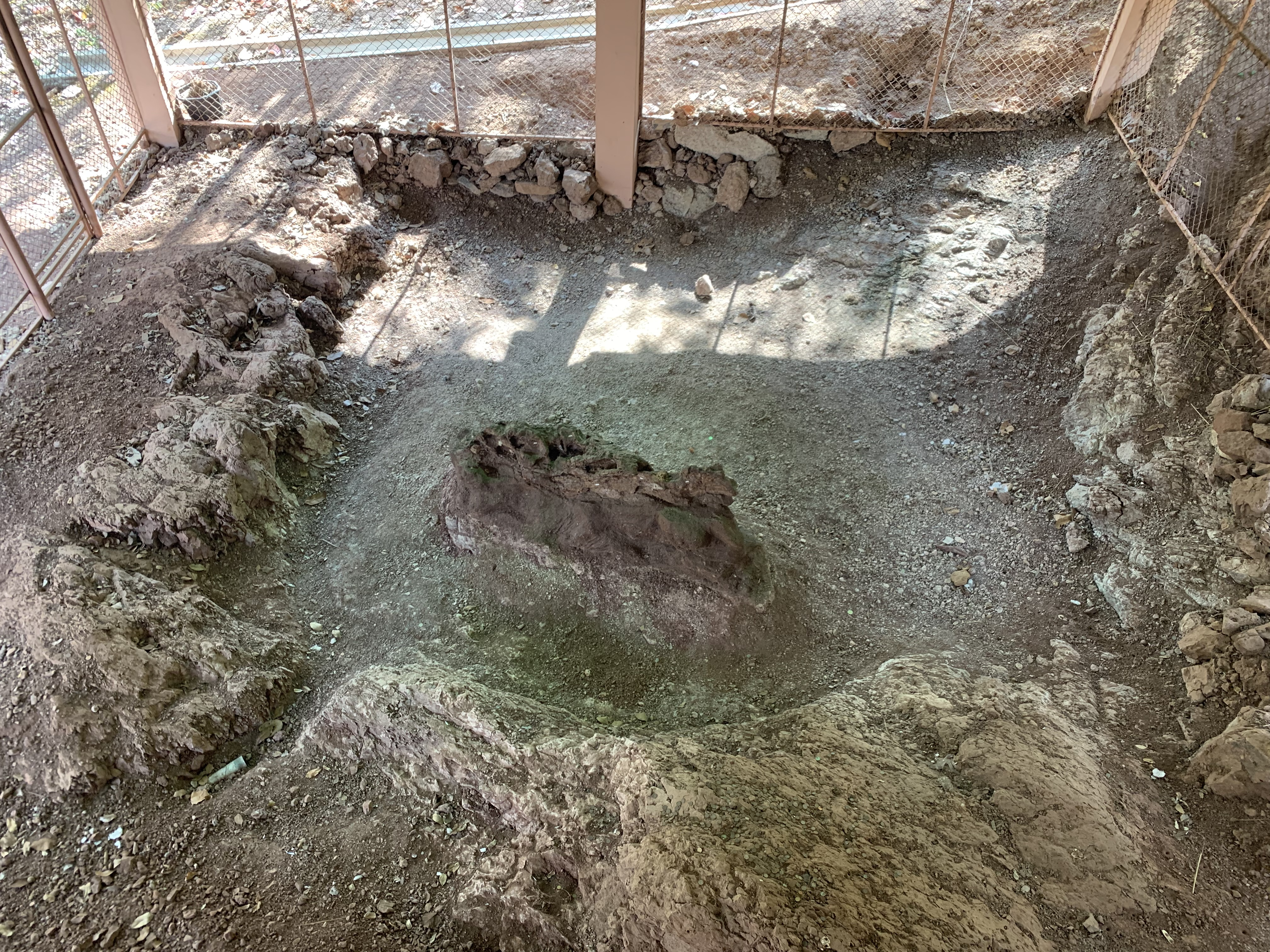
- Chiang Muan Dinosaur excavation site

- District location in Phayao province
- Coordinates: 18°53′12″N 100°18′12″E
- Country: Thailand
- Province: Phayao
- Seat: Chiang Muan
- Subdistricts: 3
- Mubans: 34

Area
  - Total: 722.860 km^{2} (279.098 sq mi)

Population (2014)
  - Total: 19,032
  - Density: 26.5/km^{2} (69/sq mi)
- Time zone: UTC+7 (ICT)
- Postal code: 56160
- Geocode: 5604

Chiang Muan (Thai: เชียงม่วน, pronounced [tɕʰīaŋ mûan]; Northern Thai: ᨩ᩠ᨿᨦᨾ᩠᩵ᩅᩁ, pronounced [tɕīaŋ mûan]) is located in the Phayao Province of northern Thailand, known for its natural beauty and agricultural activities. It lies within the Phi Pan Nam Mountains and is home to the Yom River, which provides an essential water resource for the district. The terrain is largely mountainous, contributing to the area’s scenic landscape, and it includes Doi Phu Nang National Park, a notable attraction.

The district is divided into three sub-districts (tambons) - Chiang Muan, Ban Mang, and Sa - which are further subdivided into 34 villages (mubans). These administrative divisions play an important role in the district's local governance and community activities.

Key attractions in Chiang Muan include:

Doi Phu Nang National Park, known for its waterfalls, caves, and rich biodiversity. Chiang Muan Dinosaur Museum, which exhibits dinosaur fossils, providing educational insights into prehistoric life. Wat Tha Fa Tai, a Buddhist temple that holds cultural and spiritual significance in the area. The district's economy is based on agriculture, with rice farming being particularly significant. Livestock farming and the production of local crafts also contribute to the economy. The area reflects the cultural traditions of northern Thailand, with various festivals and events that celebrate its heritage.

== History ==
Chiang Mun was originally part of the District Ban Muang of Chiang Rai province (which was later renamed Pong district). On 12 May 1969, the minor district (king amphoe) Chiang Mun was established as a subordinate of Pong district, consisting of the two tambons Chiang Muan and Sa. The third sub-district Ban Mang was established in 1970.

On 1 April 1974, it was upgraded to a full district and, in 1977, it was added to newly established Phayao Province.

== Geography ==
Neighboring districts are (from the west clockwise): Dok Khamtai and Pong of Phayao Province; Ban Luang of Nan province; and Song of Phrae province.

The Phi Pan Nam Mountains dominate the landscape of the district. The Yom River, which has its sources in the range, is an important water resource. Doi Phu Nang National Park is in Chiang Muan District.

== Administration ==
=== Central administration ===
Chiang Muan is divided into three sub-districts (tambons), which are further subdivided into 34 administrative villages (mubans).

No.	Name	Thai	Villages	Pop.
1.	Chiang Muan	เชียงม่วน	10	7,047
2.	Ban Mang	บ้านมาง	11	5,791
3.	Sa	สระ	13	6,194

=== Local administration ===
There is one sub-district municipality (thesaban tambon) in the district:

- Chiang Muan (Thai: เทศบาลตำบลเชียงม่วน) consisting of sub-district Chiang Muan and parts of sub-district Ban Mang.

There are two sub-district administrative organizations (SAO) in the district:

- Ban Mang (Thai: องค์การบริหารส่วนตำบลบ้านมาง) consisting of parts of sub-district Ban Mang.
- Sa (Thai: องค์การบริหารส่วนตำบลสระ) consisting of sub-district Sa.
