= Mae Charim district =

Mae Charim แม่จริม
- District
- District location in Nan province
- Coordinates: 18°42′12″N 101°0′18″E
- Country: Thailand
- Province: Nan

Government
  - Marshal: Thinnagorn Chaidee

Area
  - Total: 998.152 km^{2} (385.389 sq mi)

Population (2009)
  - Total: 15,553
  - Density: 15.582/km^{2} (40.357/sq mi)
- Time zone: UTC+7 (ICT)
- Postal code: 55170
- Geocode: 5502

Mae Charim (Thai: แม่จริม, pronounced [mɛ̂ː t͡ɕā.rīm]) is a district (amphoe) in the eastern part of Nan province, northern Thailand.

== History ==
Mae Charim was originally known as Bowa (บ่อว้า). The minor district (king amphoe) Mae Charim was established on 1 October 1969 with the three tambons Phong, Nong Daeng, and Mo Mueang split off from Mueang Nan district. It was upgraded to a full district on 12 April 1977.

== Geography ==
Neighboring districts are, clockwise from the southwest, Wiang Sa, Phu Phiang, Santi Suk, and Bo Kluea of Nan Province. To the east is the Xaignabouli province of Laos.

The district is in the Luang Prabang Range mountain area of the Thai highlands.

== Administration ==
The district is divided into five sub-districts (tambons), which are further subdivided into 38 villages (mubans). Nong Daeng is a township (thesaban tambon) covering parts of the tambon Nong Daeng and Mo Mueang. There are a further four tambon administrative organizations (TAO).

No.	Name	Thai name	Villages	Pop.
2.	Nong Daeng	หนองแดง	10	4,229
3.	Mo Mueang	หมอเมือง	6	2,450
4.	Nam Phang	น้ำพาง	10	4,914
5.	Nam Pai	น้ำปาย	6	2,001
6.	Mae Charim	แม่จริม	6	2,200

The missing number 1 refers to tambon Phong which is now part of Santi Suk District.
