= Song district =

Song สอง
- District
- District location in Phrae province
- Coordinates: 18°28′12″N 100°11′0″E
- Country: Thailand
- Province: Phrae
- Seat: Ban Klang

Area
  - Total: 1,624.5 km^{2} (627.2 sq mi)

Population (2005)
  - Total: 53,687
  - Density: 33/km^{2} (85/sq mi)
- Time zone: UTC+7 (ICT)
- Postal code: 54120
- Geocode: 5406

Song (Thai: สอง, pronounced [sɔ̌ːŋ]) is the northernmost district (amphoe) of Phrae province, northern Thailand.

== Geography ==
Neighboring districts are (from the southeast clockwise): Rong Kwang, and Nong Muang Khai of Phrae Province; Mae Mo and Ngao of Lampang province; Dok Khamtai and Chiang Muan of Phayao province; Ban Luang and Wiang Sa of Nan province.

The mountainous landscape of the Phi Pan Nam Range dominates the district. Mae Yom National Park is in Song District. The everyday life of the villagers there was investigated by Living River Siam because of the possibility that a dam would be built in Kaeng Sua Ten.

== Phra That Phra Lo ==
Phra That Phra Lo, an ancient chedi is in Ban Klang Sub-district, west of Song. The chedi is said to house the remains of King Phra Lo, who died together with Phra Phuean and Phra Phaeng, the two women he loved who were the daughters of the ruler of the city of Song. The tragic story Lilit Phra Lo (ลิลิตพระลอ) originated in a tale of Thai folklore and later became part of Thai literature. It was voted the best lilit work by King Rama VI's royal literary club in 1916.

== History ==
Originally named Mueang Song, 1917 the district was renamed Ban Klang after the name of the central tambon. It returned to its original name, Song, in 1939, dropping the word mueang which was reserved for the capital districts of provinces.

== Administration ==
The district is divided into eight sub-districts (tambons), which are further subdivided into 84 villages (mubans). Song is a township (thesaban tambon) and covers parts of tambons Ban Nun and Ban Klang. There are a further eight tambon administrative organizations (TAO).

No.	Name	Thai name	Villages	Pop.
1.	Ban Nun	บ้านหนุน	11	9,160
2.	Ban Klang	บ้านกลาง	12	8,392
3.	Huai Mai	ห้วยหม้าย	17	8,769
4.	Tao Pun	เตาปูน	12	8,418
5.	Hua Mueang	หัวเมือง	13	6,828
6.	Sa-iap	สะเอียบ	9	5,671
7.	Daen Chumphon	แดนชุมพล	4	2,685
8.	Thung Nao	ทุ่งน้าว	5	3,764
