= Ban Luang district =

Ban Luang บ้านหลวง
- District
- District location in Nan province
- Coordinates: 18°51′5″N 100°26′18″E
- Country: Thailand
- Province: Nan

Government
  - Marshal: Sunthorn Mahawongsanan

Area
  - Total: 338.210 km^{2} (130.584 sq mi)

Population (2009)
  - Total: 12,063
  - Density: 35.667/km^{2} (92.378/sq mi)
- Time zone: UTC+7 (ICT)
- Postal code: 55190
- Geocode: 5503

Ban Luang (Thai: บ้านหลวง, pronounced [bâːn lǔaŋ]; Northern Thai: ᨷ᩶ᩣ᩠ᨶᩉᩖ᩠ᩅᨦ, pronounced [ba᷇ːn lǔaŋ]) is a district (amphoe) in the western part of Nan province, northern Thailand.

== History ==
Originally the area was Tambon Suat of Mueang Nan district. It was created as Ban Luang Minor District (king amphoe) on 15 May 1975, when three tambons, Pa Kha Luang, Suat, and Ban Phi, were split off from Mueang District. It was upgraded to a full district on 20 October 1993.

== Geography ==
Neighboring districts are from the east clockwise Mueang Nan, Wiang Sa of Nan Province, Song of Phrae province, Chiang Muan and Pong of Phayao province.

== Administration ==
The district is divided into four sub-districts (tambons) which are further subdivided into 26 villages (mubans). There are no municipal (thesaban) areas, and four tambon administrative organizations (TAO).

No.	Name	Thai name	Villages	Pop.
1.	Ban Fa	บ้านฟ้า	8	3,663
2.	Pa Kha Luang	ป่าคาหลวง	5	2,889
3.	Suat	สวด	8	3,032
4.	Ban Phi	บ้านพี้	5	2,569
