= Pong district =

Pong ปง
- Amphoe
- Amphoe location in Phayao province
- Coordinates: 19°8′54″N 100°16′30″E
- Country: Thailand
- Province: Phayao
- Seat: Pong

Area
  - Total: 1,783.452 km^{2} (688.595 sq mi)

Population (2005)
  - Total: 53,212
  - Density: 29.8/km^{2} (77/sq mi)
- Time zone: UTC+7 (ICT)
- Postal code: 56140
- Geocode: 5606

Pong (Thai: ปง, pronounced [pōŋ]; Northern Thai: ᨸᩫ᩠ᨦ, pronounced [pǒŋ]) is a district (amphoe) of Phayao province in northern Thailand.

== Geography ==
Neighbouring districts are (from the east clockwise) Song Khwae, Tha Wang Pha, Mueang Nan of Nan province, Chiang Muan, Dok Khamtai, Chun and Chiang Kham of Phayao Province.

Doi Phu Nang National Park is in the district.

== History ==
Originally named Mueang Pong, the district was renamed Ban Muang (บ้านม่วง) in 1917. In 1939 it was renamed simply "Pong". In 1952 the district was reassigned to Chiang Rai Province, except sub-district Sa-iap which was split off and added to Song District in Phrae. With the creation of the Province of Phayao in 1977 it was added to the new province.

== Administration ==
The district is divided into seven sub-districts (tambon), which are further subdivided into 88 villages (muban). There are two townships (thesaban tambon) - Pong covers which covers parts of tambon Pong and Na Prang, and Ngim covers parts of tambon Ngim. There are a further seven tambon administrative organization (TAO).

No.	Name	Thai name	Pop.
1.	Pong	ปง	8,203
2.	Khuan	ควร	5,634
3.	Oi	ออย	7,344
4.	Ngim	งิม	12,242
5.	Pha Chang Noi	ผาช้างน้อย	4,914
6.	Na Prang	นาปรัง	5,913
7.	Khun Khuan	ขุนควร	8,962
