= Tha Wang Pha district =

Tha Wang Pha ท่าวังผา
- District
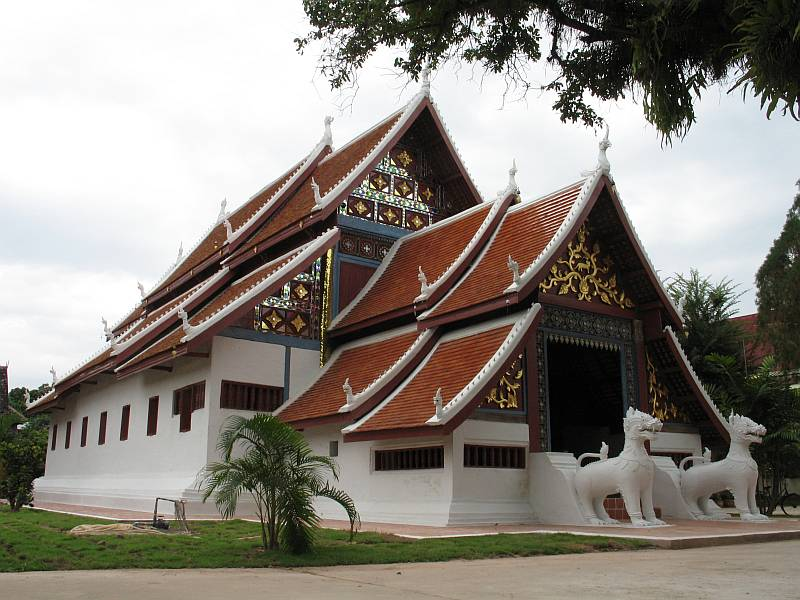
- Wat Nong Bua

- District location in Nan province
- Coordinates: 19°7′11″N 100°48′35″E
- Country: Thailand
- Province: Nan

Government
  - Marshal: Manat Kansai

Area
  - Total: 702.204 km^{2} (271.122 sq mi)

Population (2023)
  - Total: 55,297
  - Density: 78.748/km^{2} (203.96/sq mi)
- Time zone: UTC+7 (ICT)
- Postal code: 55140
- Geocode: 5506

Tha Wang Pha (Thai: ท่าวังผา, pronounced [tʰâː wāŋ pʰǎː]) is a district (amphoe) in the central part of Nan province, northern Thailand.

== History ==
The minor district (king amphoe) Tha Wang Pha was established on 1 October 1962 with area split off from Pua district. It was upgraded to a full district on 28 July 1965.

== Geography ==
Neighboring districts are, from the north clockwise, Song Khwae, Chiang Klang, Pua, Santi Suk and Mueang Nan of Nan Province, and Pong of Phayao province.

== Climate ==
Climate data for Tha Wang Pha (1991–2020, extremes 1970-present)
Month	Jan	Feb	Mar	Apr	May	Jun	Jul	Aug	Sep	Oct	Nov	Dec	Year
Record high °C (°F)	34.8 (94.6)	37.6 (99.7)	40.2 (104.4)	42.5 (108.5)	41.4 (106.5)	39.5 (103.1)	37.3 (99.1)	36.7 (98.1)	34.9 (94.8)	35.9 (96.6)	34.3 (93.7)	33.8 (92.8)	42.5 (108.5)
Mean daily maximum °C (°F)	29.4 (84.9)	32.5 (90.5)	35.4 (95.7)	36.2 (97.2)	34.7 (94.5)	33.1 (91.6)	31.8 (89.2)	31.3 (88.3)	32.2 (90.0)	31.9 (89.4)	30.6 (87.1)	28.7 (83.7)	32.3 (90.2)
Daily mean °C (°F)	20.8 (69.4)	22.7 (72.9)	26.1 (79.0)	28.4 (83.1)	28.4 (83.1)	28.1 (82.6)	27.4 (81.3)	27.0 (80.6)	27.1 (80.8)	26.1 (79.0)	23.7 (74.7)	20.9 (69.6)	25.6 (78.0)
Mean daily minimum °C (°F)	14.3 (57.7)	15.1 (59.2)	18.7 (65.7)	22.3 (72.1)	23.9 (75.0)	24.6 (76.3)	24.3 (75.7)	24.0 (75.2)	23.7 (74.7)	22.1 (71.8)	18.6 (65.5)	15.1 (59.2)	20.6 (69.0)
Record low °C (°F)	1.9 (35.4)	5.4 (41.7)	7.2 (45.0)	15.3 (59.5)	18.4 (65.1)	19.6 (67.3)	19.7 (67.5)	19.8 (67.6)	18.0 (64.4)	12.0 (53.6)	6.2 (43.2)	1.7 (35.1)	1.7 (35.1)
Average precipitation mm (inches)	15.0 (0.59)	7.7 (0.30)	38.9 (1.53)	97.2 (3.83)	175.7 (6.92)	177.5 (6.99)	285.4 (11.24)	329.5 (12.97)	219.9 (8.66)	75.1 (2.96)	23.1 (0.91)	18.0 (0.71)	1,463 (57.6)
Average precipitation days (≥ 1.0 mm)	1.3	0.9	3.2	7.1	13.2	14.1	17.9	20.1	13.7	6.9	2.4	1.0	101.8
Average relative humidity (%)	79.2	73.0	68.8	71.0	77.7	81.0	84.0	86.0	84.9	83.2	81.2	80.1	79.2
Mean monthly sunshine hours	288.3	271.2	313.1	243.0	198.4	117.0	120.9	58.9	144.0	198.4	249.0	269.7	2,471.9
Mean daily sunshine hours	9.3	9.6	10.1	8.1	6.4	3.9	3.9	1.9	4.8	6.4	8.3	8.7	6.8
Source 1: World Meteorological Organization
Source 2: Office of Water Management and Hydrology, Royal Irrigation Department (sun 1981–2010) (extremes)

== Administration ==
The district is divided into 10 sub-districts (tambons), which are further subdivided into 91 villages (mubans). Tha Wang Pha is a township (thesaban tambon) covering parts of the same-named tambon. There are a further nine tambon administrative organizations (TAO).

No.	Name	Thai name	Villages	Pop.
1.	Rim	ริม	6	4,325
2.	Pa Kha	ป่าคา	7	5,117
3.	Pha To	ผาตอ	7	5,120
4.	Yom	ยม	10	4,900
5.	Tan Chum	ตาลชุม	14	6,672
6.	Si Phum	ศรีภูมิ	12	6,766
7.	Chom Phra	จอมพระ	11	5,465
8.	Saen Thong	แสนทอง	8	3,948
9.	Tha Wang Pha	ท่าวังผา	8	5,663
10.	Pha Thong	ผาทอง	8	4,074

== Economy ==
Ban Fai Mun village in the district is known for its fine knives. Nan and Phrae Provinces were settled by Tai Phuan people who migrated to northern Thailand in 1834 from Laos. The people of Ban Fai Mun brought with them a distinctive dialect, way of life, and a knife making tradition. About 10% of the population of 1,134 make their living by making knives.

== Gallery ==
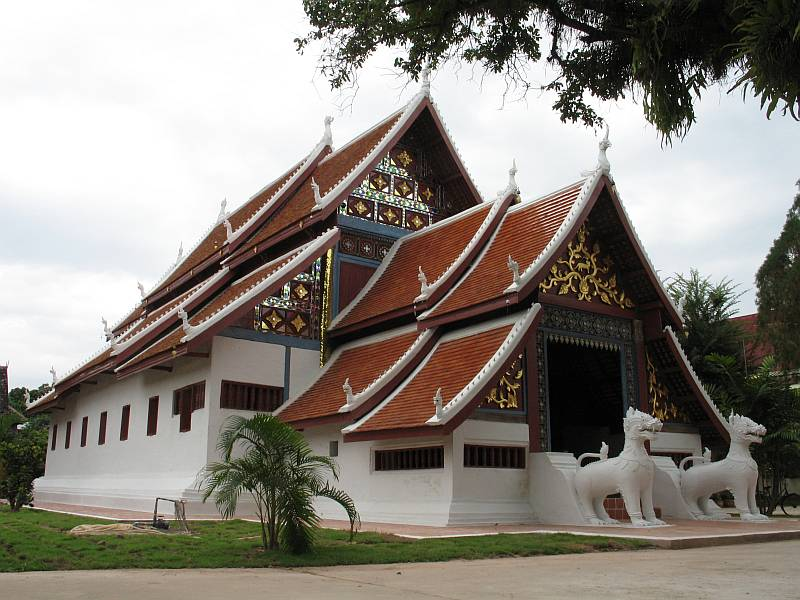
Wat Nong Bua, Tha Wang Pha

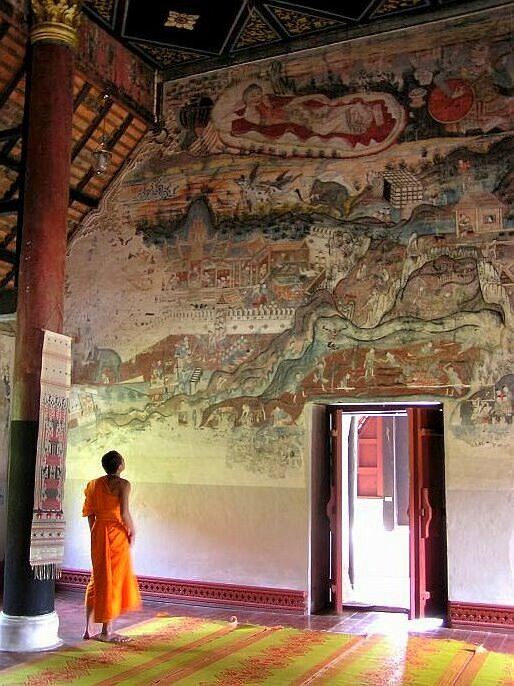
Wat Nong Bua, Tha Wang Pha

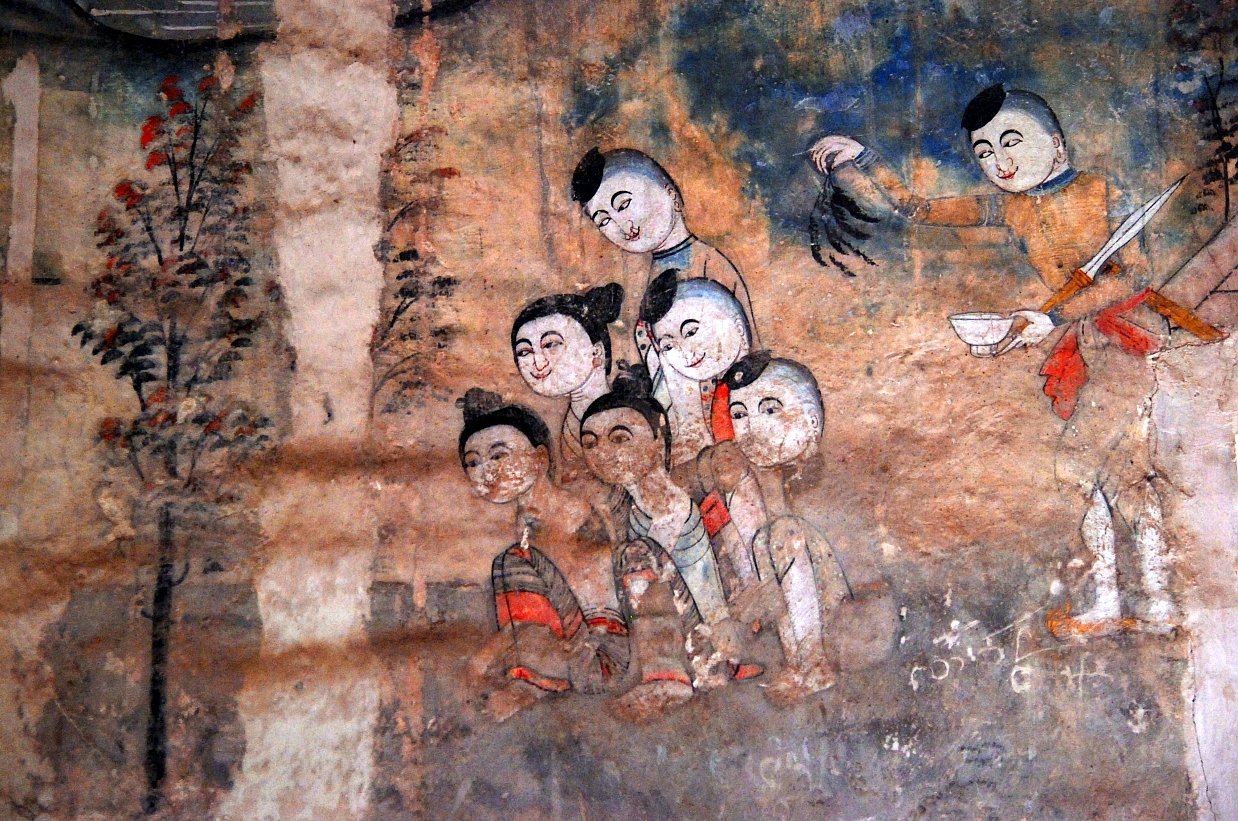
19th century temple murals in Thai Lue style, Wat Nong Bua

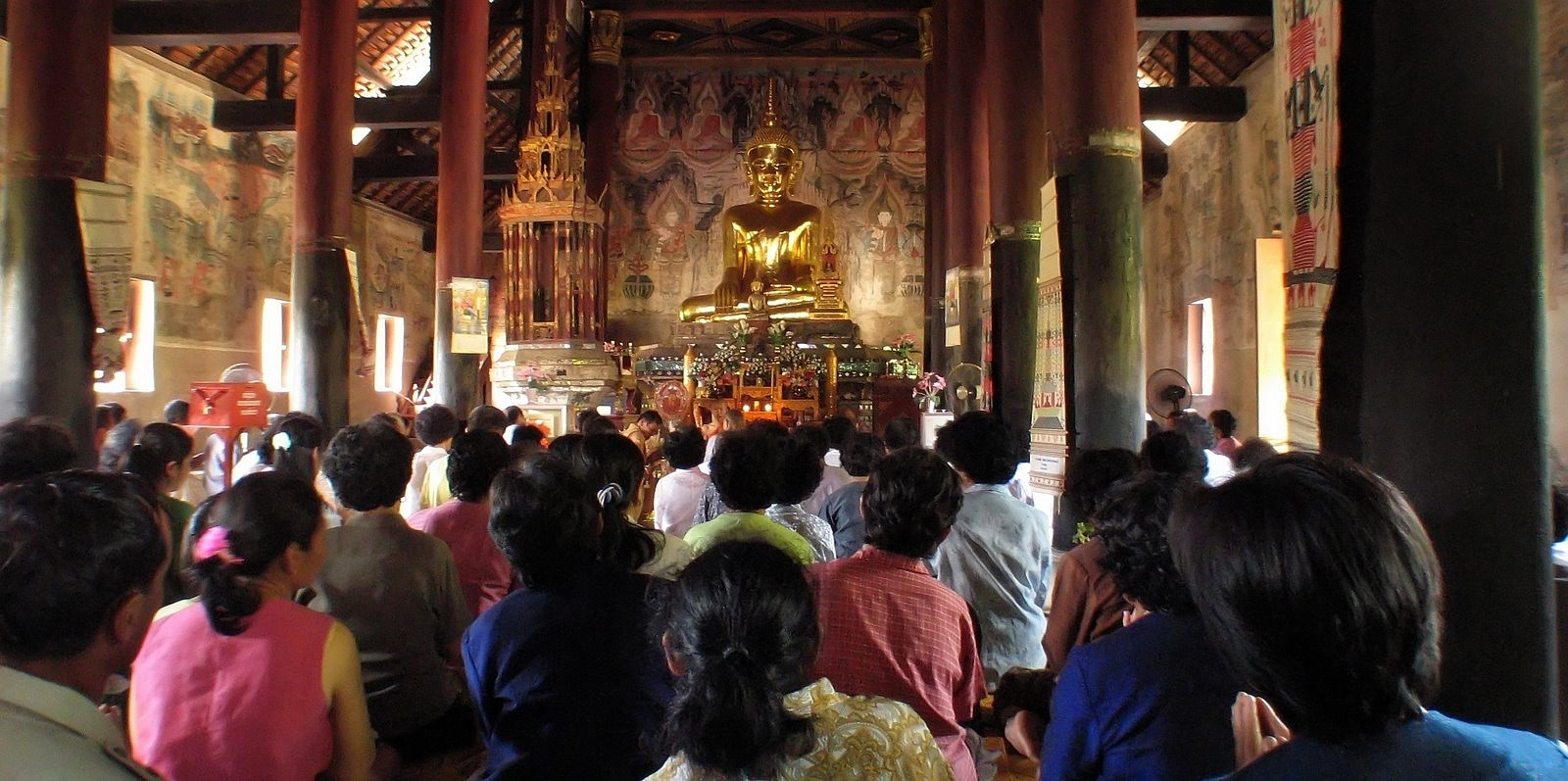
A young boy becomes a monk, Wat Nong Bua

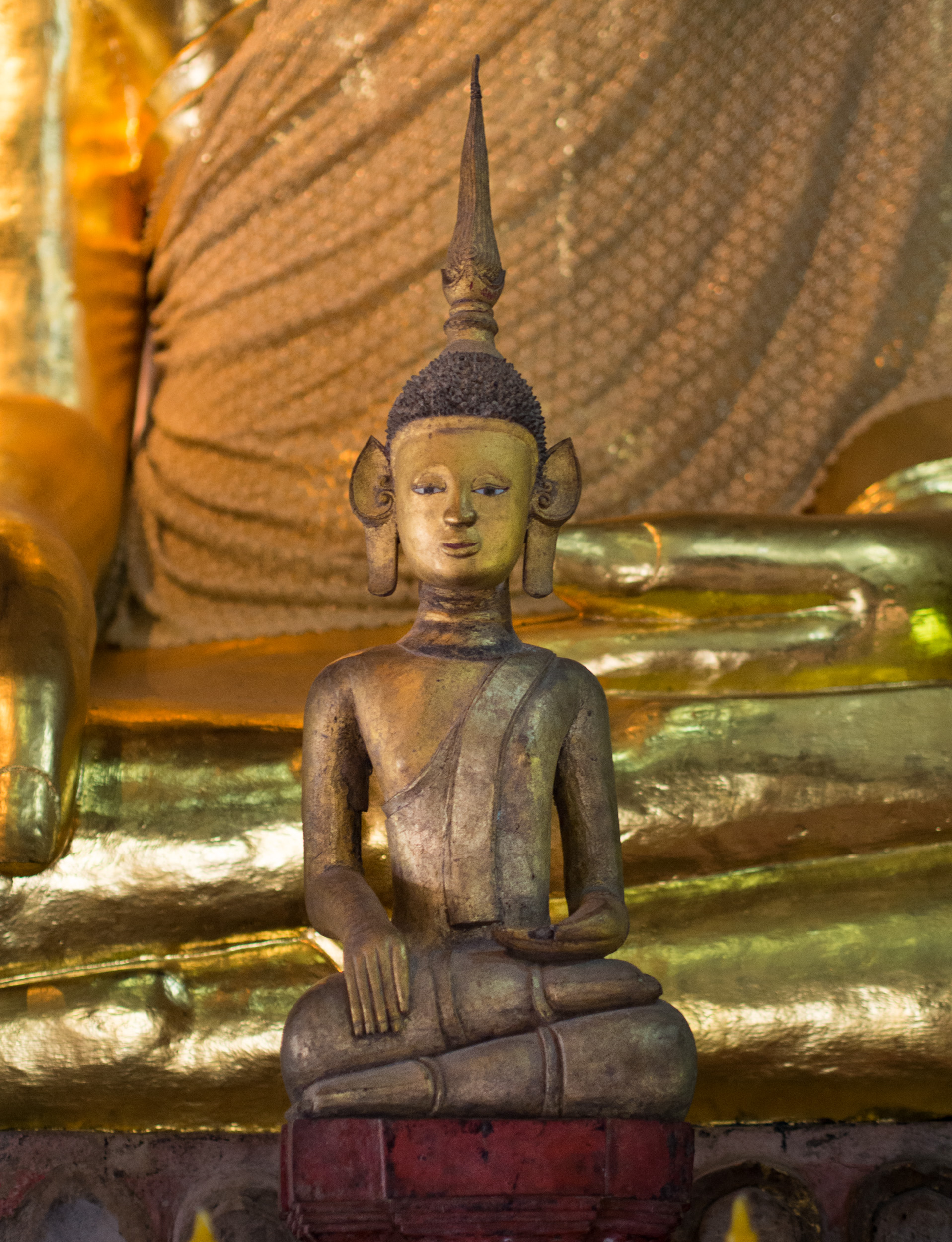
Thai Lue Buddha statue, Wat Nong Bua

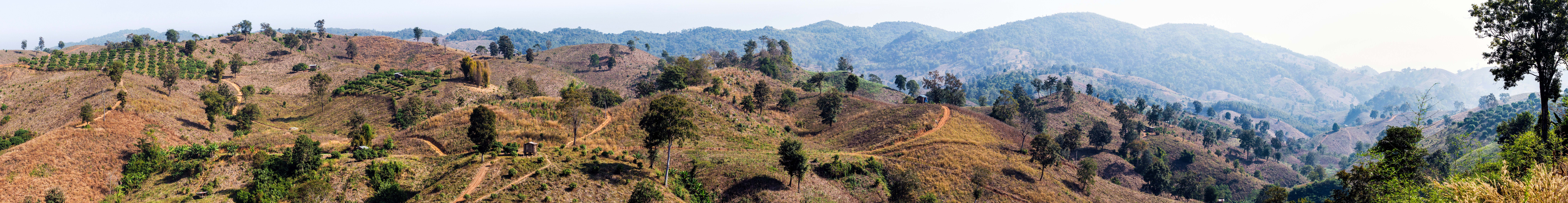
Eastern flank of the Phi Pan Nam Range
