= Pua district =

Pua ปัว
- District
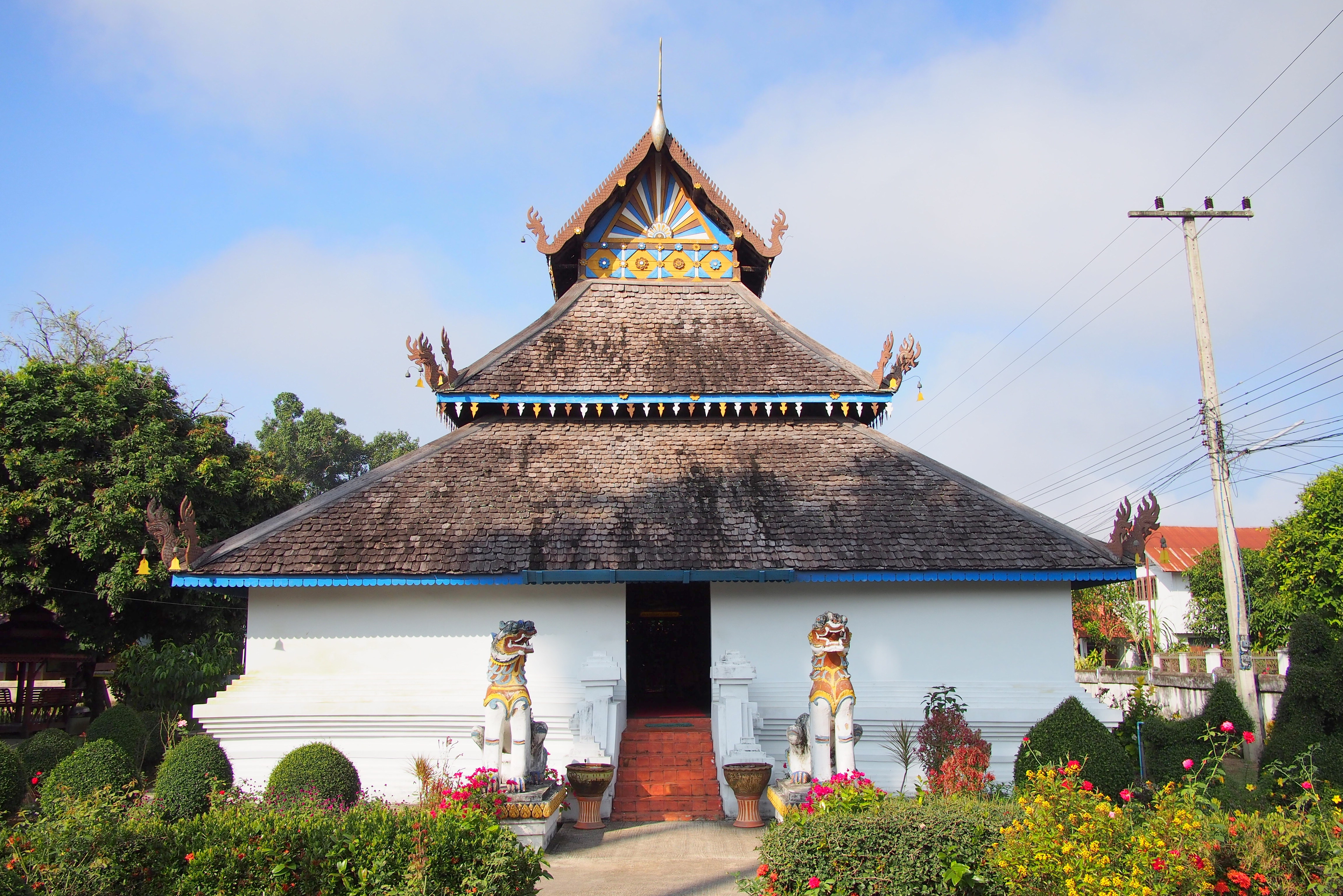
- Wat Baan Ton Lhaeng

- District location in Nan province
- Coordinates: 19°10′27″N 100°55′0″E
- Country: Thailand
- Province: Nan

Government
  - Marshal: Kamthorn Su-Arun

Area
  - Total: 657.363 km^{2} (253.809 sq mi)

Population (2015)
  - Total: 64,813
  - Density: 98.595/km^{2} (255.36/sq mi)
- Time zone: UTC+7 (ICT)
- Postal code: 55120
- Geocode: 5505

Pua (Thai: ปัว, pronounced [pūa]; Northern Thai: ᨻᩫᩖ᩠ᩅ, pronounced [pua]) is a district (amphoe) in the central part of Nan province, northern Thailand.

== Geography ==
Neighboring districts are, from the north clockwise, Chiang Klang, Thung Chang, Chaloem Phra Kiat, Bo Kluea, Santi Suk, and Tha Wang Pha.

Doi Phu Kha National Park is Thailand's largest national park, covering several districts of Nan Province. The national park office as well as the 1,980 m high Doi Phu Kha in the Luang Prabang Range itself are within Pua District.

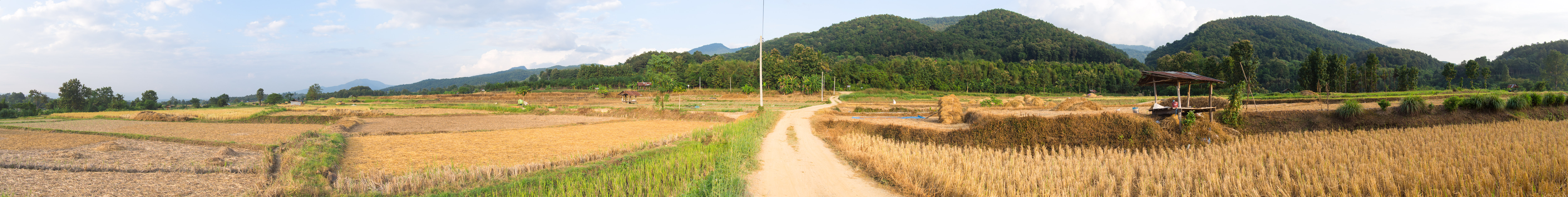
Paddy fields in Pua District during the rice harvest, with the forested hills and mountains of Doi Phu Kha National Park in the background

== Administration ==
=== Central administration ===
Pua is divided into 12 sub-districts (tambons), which are further subdivided into 107 administrative villages (mubans).

No.	Name	Thai	Villages	Pop.
1.	Pua	ปัว	8	7,302
2.	Ngaeng	แงง	7	4,843
3.	Sathan	สถาน	13	6,074
4.	Sila Laeng	ศิลาแลง	8	3,968
5.	Sila Phet	ศิลาเพชร	10	4,567
6.	Uan	อวน	11	4,990
9.	Chai Watthana	ไชยวัฒนา	8	4,232
10.	Chedi Chai	เจดีย์ชัย	9	6,908
11.	Phu Kha	ภูคา	14	4,902
12.	Sakat	สกาด	4	2,903
13.	Pa Klang	ป่ากลาง	7	8,300
14.	Wora Nakhon	วรนคร	8	5,824

Missing numbers belong to tambon which are now part of Bo Kluea District.

=== Local administration ===
There are two sub-district municipalities (thesaban tambons) in the district:

- Pua (Thai: เทศบาลตำบลปัว) consisting of sub-district Pua and parts of the sub-districts Sathan, Chai Watthana, Wora Nakhon.
- Sila Laeng (Thai: เทศบาลตำบลศิลาแลง) consisting of sub-district Sila Laeng.

There are 10 sub-district administrative organizations (SAO) in the district:

- Ngaeng (Thai: องค์การบริหารส่วนตำบลแงง) consisting of sub-district Ngaeng.
- Sathan (Thai: องค์การบริหารส่วนตำบลสถาน) consisting of parts of sub-district Sathan.
- Sila Phet (Thai: องค์การบริหารส่วนตำบลศิลาเพชร) consisting of sub-district Sila Phet.
- Uan (Thai: องค์การบริหารส่วนตำบลอวน) consisting of sub-district Uan.
- Chai Watthana (Thai: องค์การบริหารส่วนตำบลไชยวัฒนา) consisting of parts of sub-district Chai Watthana.
- Chedi Chai (Thai: องค์การบริหารส่วนตำบลเจดีย์ชัย) consisting of sub-district Chedi Chai.
- Phu Kha (Thai: องค์การบริหารส่วนตำบลภูคา) consisting of sub-district Phu Kha.
- Sakat (Thai: องค์การบริหารส่วนตำบลสกาด) consisting of sub-district Sakat.
- Pa Klang (Thai: องค์การบริหารส่วนตำบลป่ากลาง) consisting of sub-district Pa Klang.
- Wora Nakhon (Thai: องค์การบริหารส่วนตำบลวรนคร) consisting of parts of sub-district Wora Nakhon.

== Economy ==
Pua district is heavily agricultural. It is a significant maize-growing area. Farmer's zeal to clear more land for maize cultivation has led to deforestation of vast tracts of hillsides, resulting in "bald mountains" (Thai: เขาหัวล้าน; RTGS: Khao Hua Lan). A by-product of the land clearing is smoke from field burning, contributing to the northern region's significant air pollution. Charoen Pokphand (CP) Group, Thailand's largest agro-industrial and food conglomerate, and the leading purchaser of Pua District maize, in March 2016 announced an "agricultural social enterprise" to steer district villagers away from maize farming. CP Group has incurred criticism for the way it purchases maize harvests for animal feed from farmers in Nan and other provinces. Suphachai Chearavanont, vice-chairman of CP Group, said that corn planters will be encouraged to grow cash crops such as coffee, which requires less farmland and makes a higher profit than maize. Not only will this address the bald-mountain problem, he said, but it will also help reduce the spring haze in the north which is caused by slash-and-burn practices to prepare land for the next maize season. Mr Suphachai said crops like coffee take about three-and-a-half years to show a yield, but stated that CP Group would stand by farmers and provide assistance in the meantime.

== Gallery ==
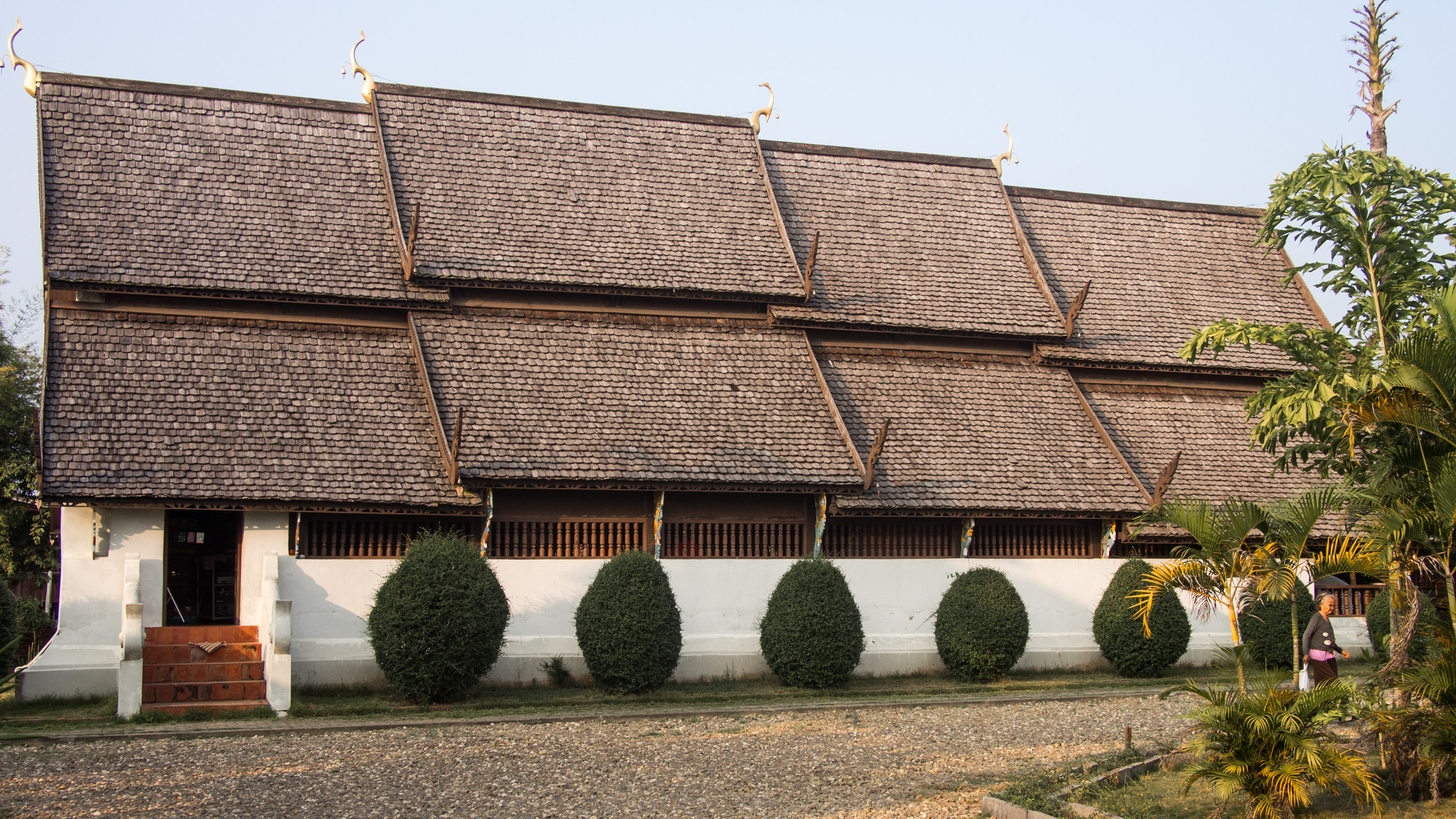
Wat Rong Ngae

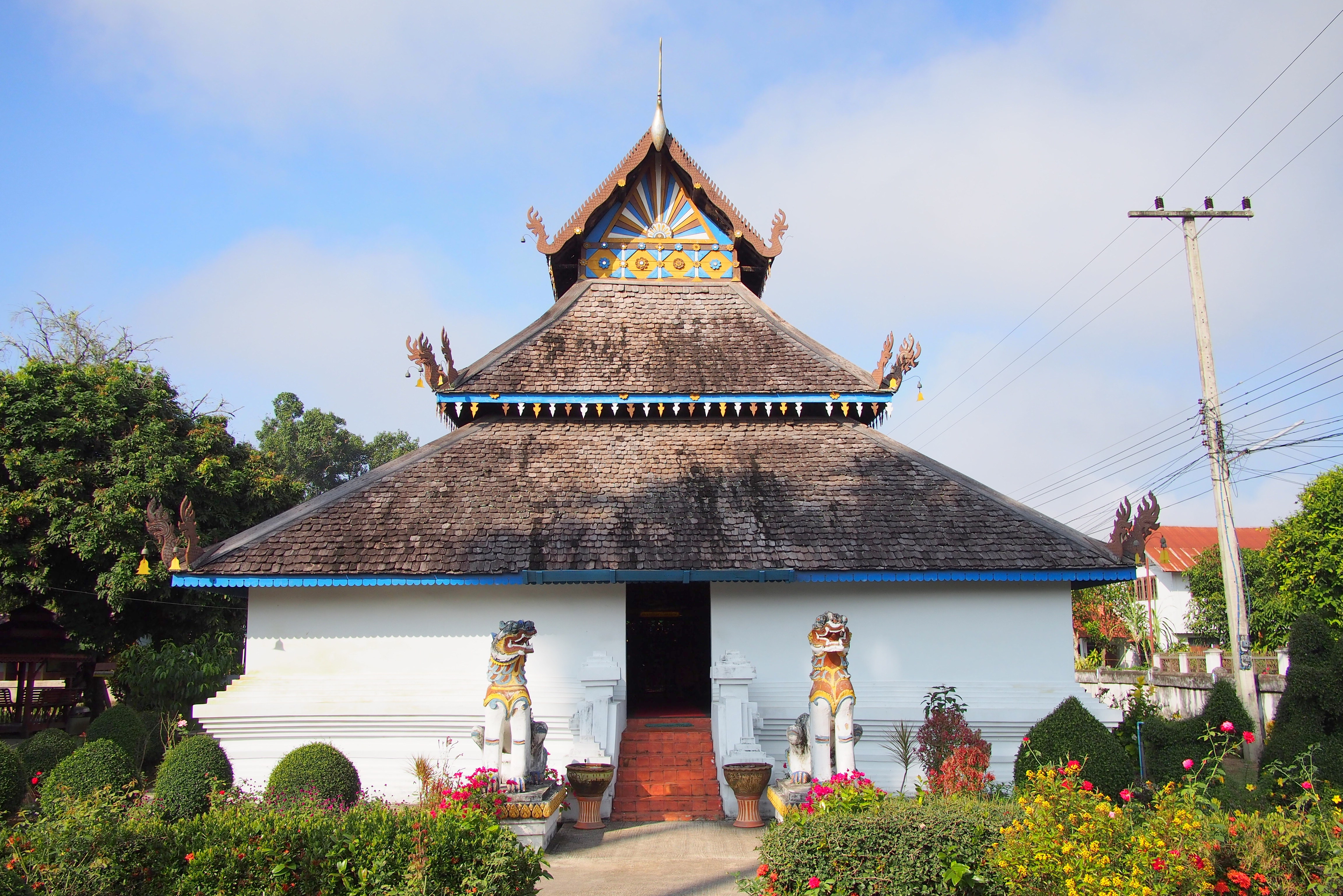
Wat Ban Ton Laeng

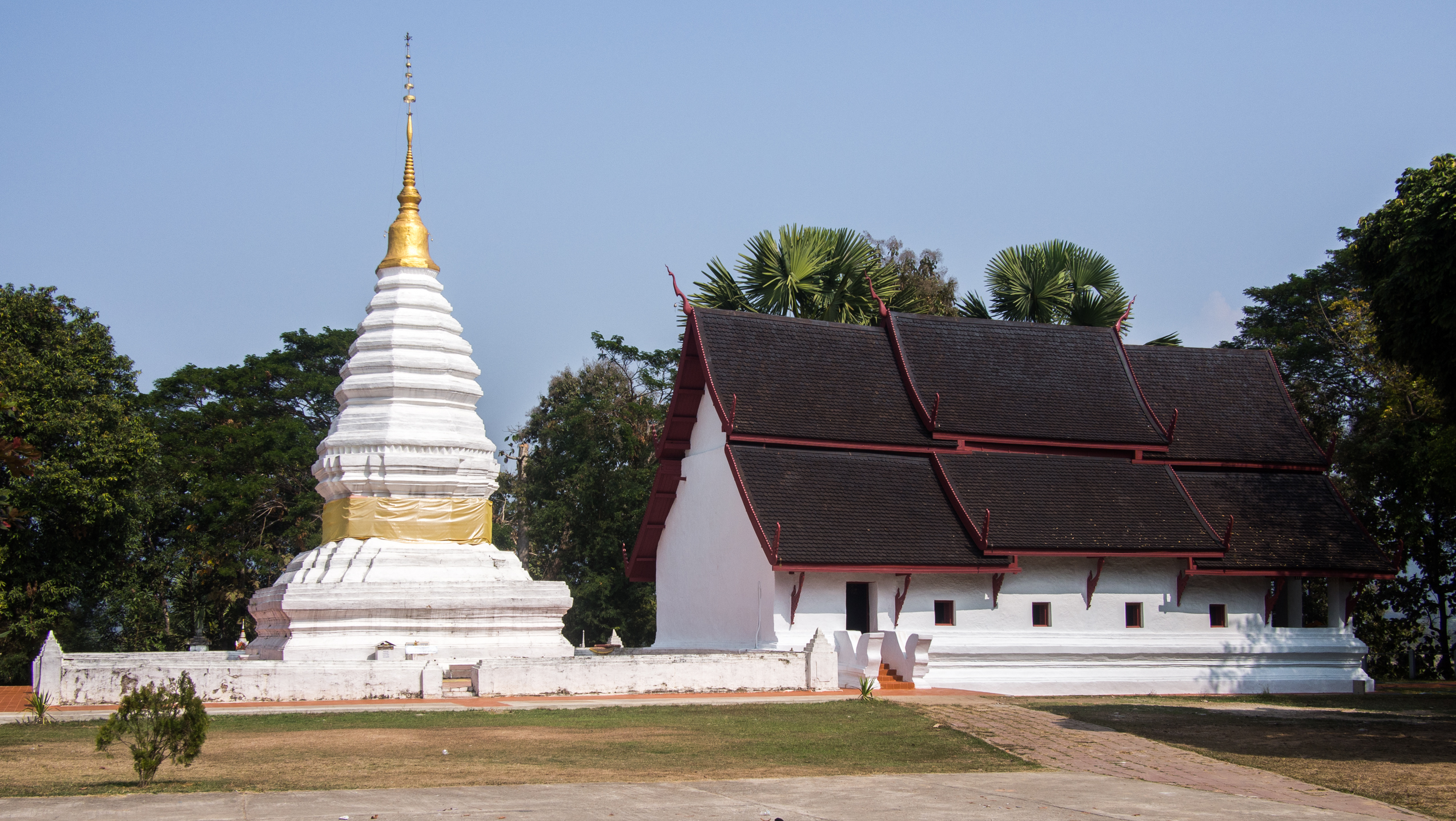
Wat Phra That Bueng Sakat

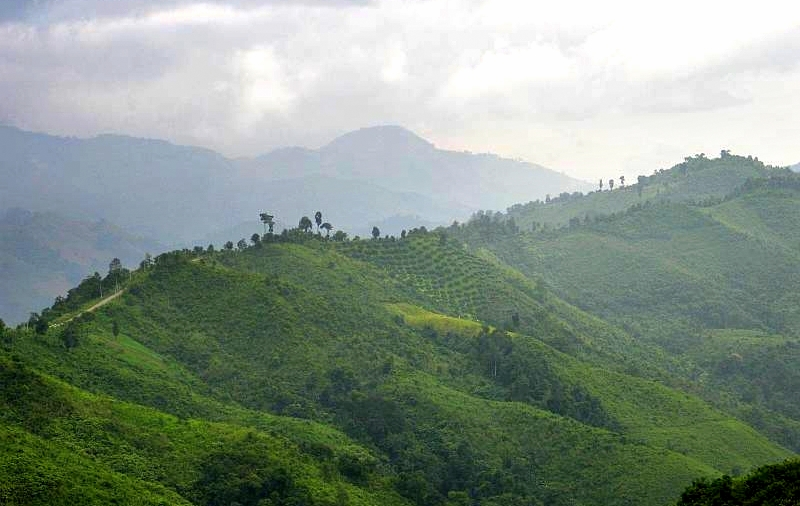
Road number 1256 on a ridge near Doi Phu Kha

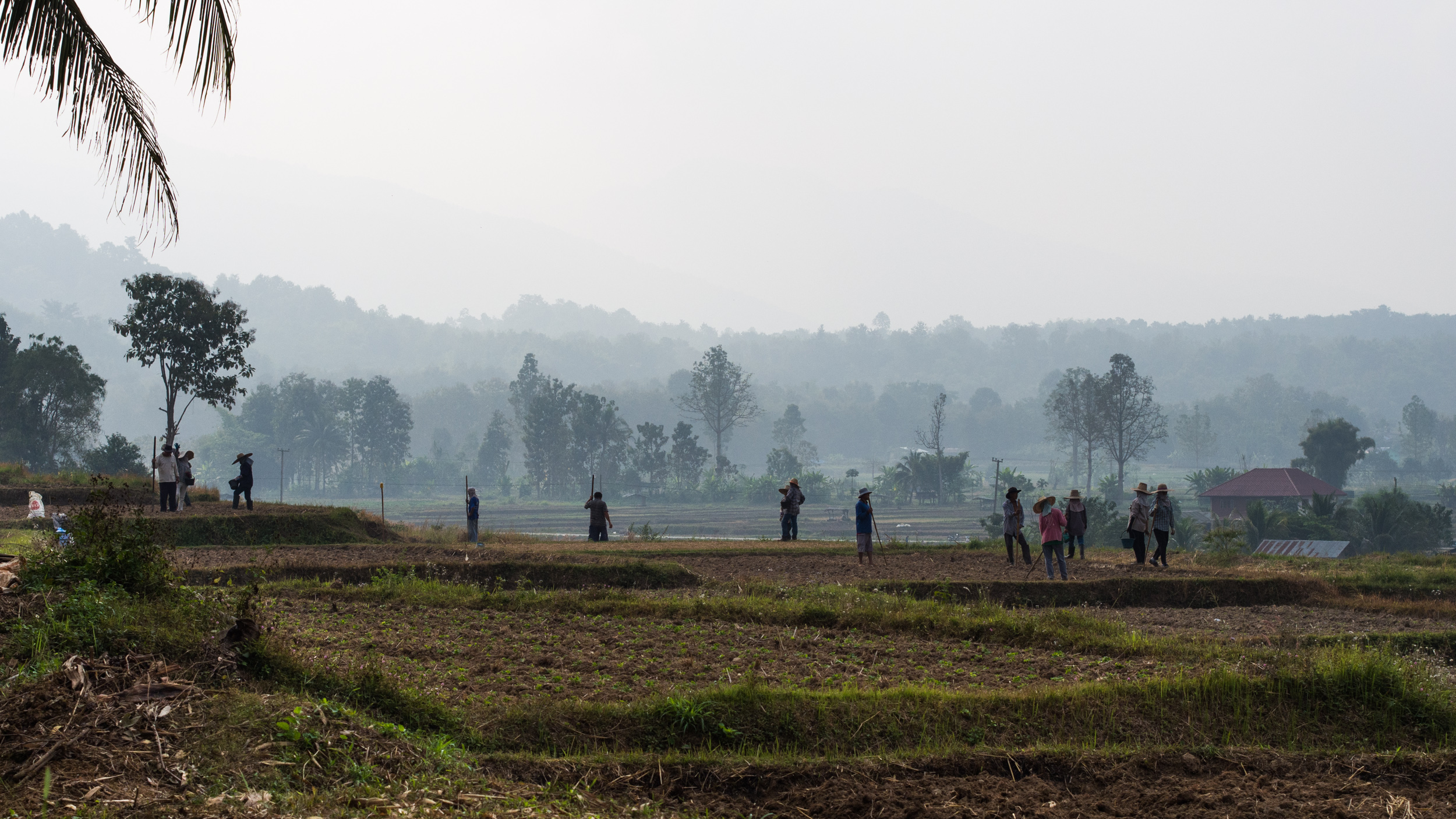
Countryside east of Pua

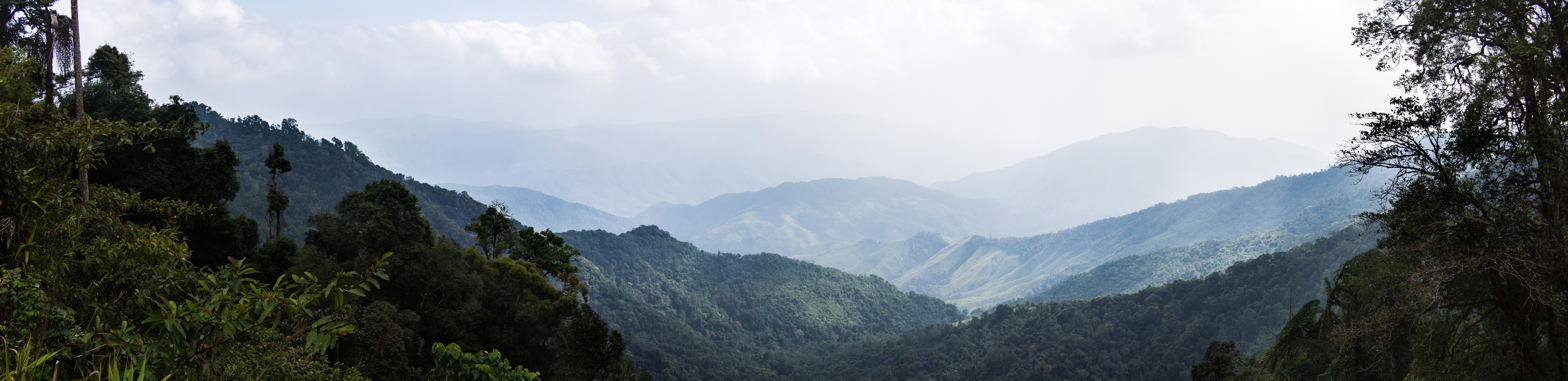
The mountains of Doi Phu Kha National Park
