= Song Khwae district =

Song Khwae สองแคว
- District
- District location in Nan province
- Coordinates: 19°21′35″N 100°42′3″E
- Country: Thailand
- Province: Nan

Government
  - Marshal: Ong-Ard Sangkahatthakorn

Area
  - Total: 544.364 km^{2} (210.180 sq mi)

Population (2009)
  - Total: 11,765
  - Density: 21.612/km^{2} (55.976/sq mi)
- Time zone: UTC+7 (ICT)
- Postal code: 55160
- Geocode: 5513

Song Khwae (Thai: สองแคว, pronounced [sɔ̌ːŋ kʰwɛ̄ː]) is a district (amphoe) in the northwestern part of Nan province, northern Thailand.

== History ==
The minor district (king amphoe) Song Khwae was established on 1 April 1992 with three tambons split off from Chiang Klang district. It was upgraded to a full district on 11 October 1997.

== Geography ==
Neighboring districts are, from the east clockwise, Thung Chang, Chiang Klang and Tha Wang Pha of Nan Province, Pong and Chiang Kham of Phayao province. To the north it borders Xaignabouli province of Laos.

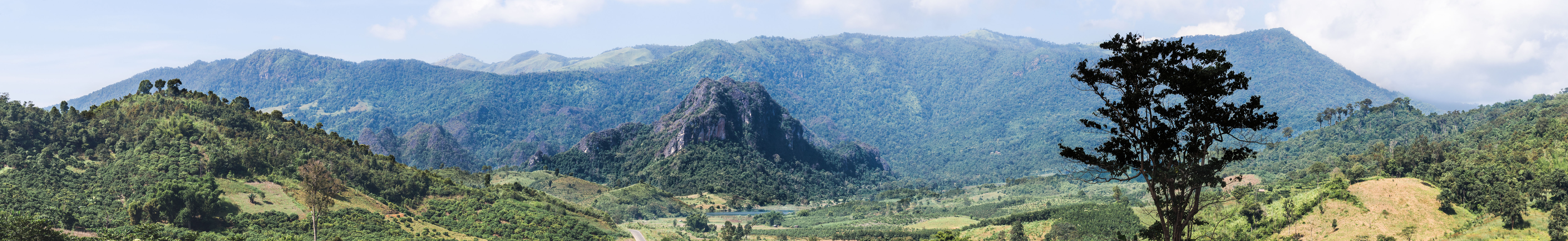
Karst formations in the Phi Pan Nam Range from Rte 1148

== Administration ==
The district is divided into three sub-districts (tambons), which are further subdivided into 25 villages (mubans). Yot is the township (thesaban tambon) and covers tambon Yot. There are a further two tambon administrative organizations (TAO).

No.	Name	Thai name	Villages	Pop.
1.	Na Rai Luang	นาไร่หลวง	10	5,693
2.	Chon Daen	ชนแดน	9	2,989
3.	Yot	ยอด	6	2,825
