= Phu Phiang district =

Phu Phiang ภูเพียง
- District
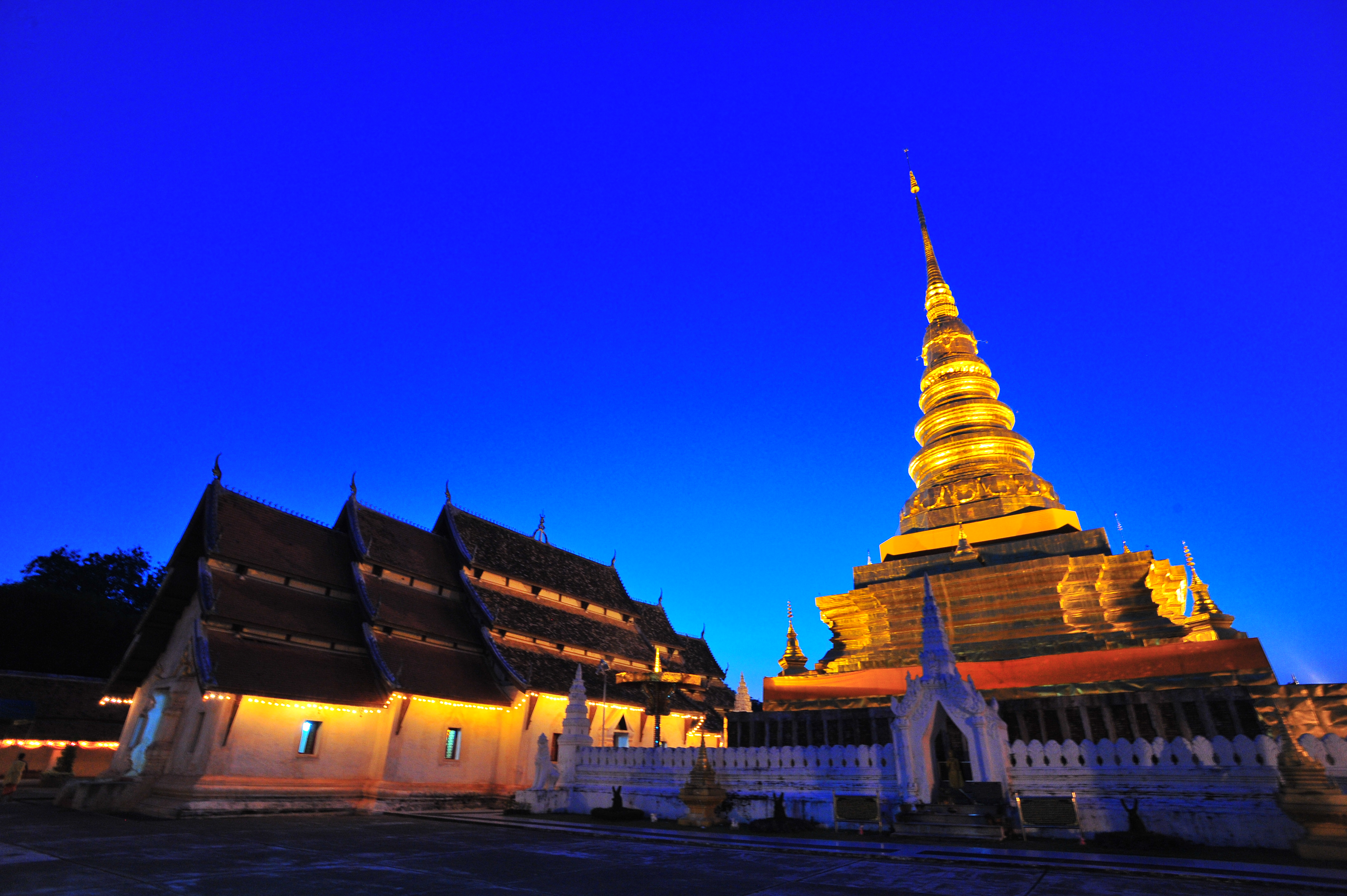
- Wat Phra That Chae Haeng at dusk

- District location in Nan province
- Coordinates: 18°44′34″N 100°47′57″E
- Country: Thailand
- Province: Nan

Government
  - Marshal: Udomkat Rachnui

Area
  - Total: 508.236 km^{2} (196.231 sq mi)

Population (2009)
  - Total: 35,535
  - Density: 69.918/km^{2} (181.09/sq mi)
- Time zone: UTC+7 (ICT)
- Postal code: 55000
- Geocode: 5514

Phu Phiang (Thai: ภูเพียง, pronounced [pʰūː pʰīaŋ]; Northern Thai: ᨻᩪᨻ᩠ᨿᨦ, pronounced [pūːpīaŋ]) is a district (amphoe) in the central part of Nan province, northern Thailand.

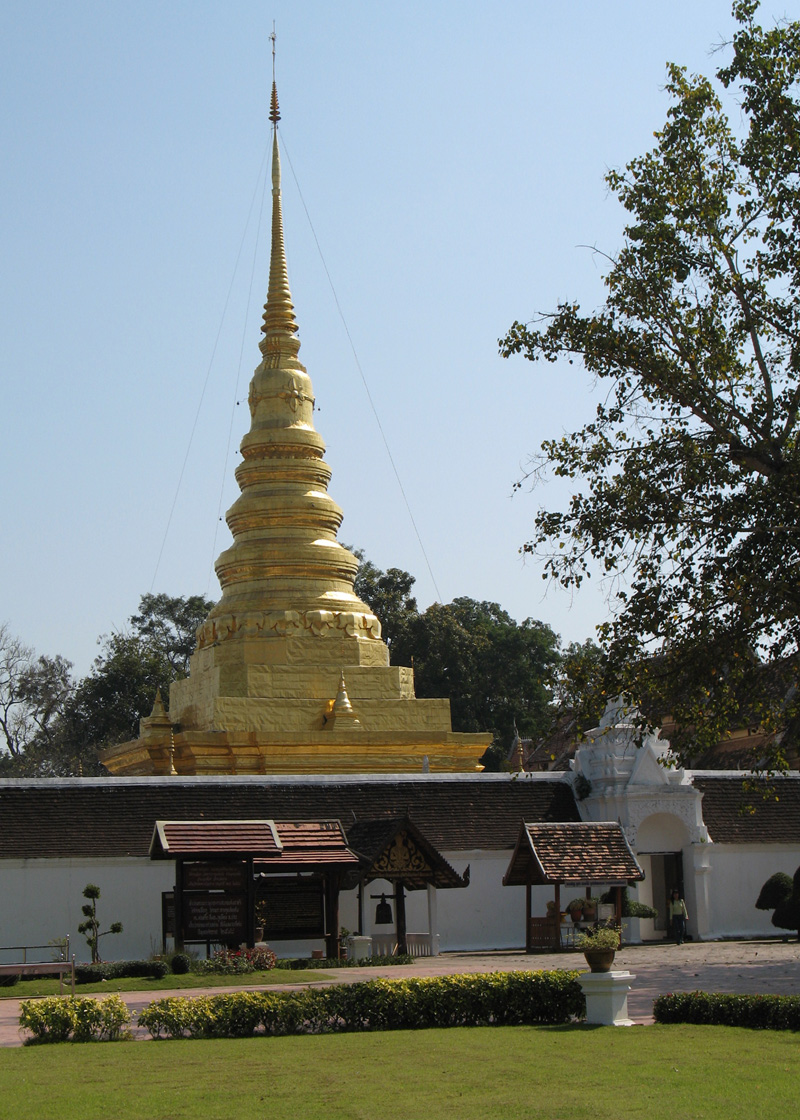
Phra That Chae Haeng atop Phu Phiang Mountain

== History ==
The area was separated from Mueang Nan district to create a minor district (king amphoe) on 1 July 1997.

On 15 May 2007, all 81 minor districts were upgraded to full districts. On August 24 the upgrade became official.

== Etymology ==
The name Phu Phiang comes from the name of Phu Phiang Mountain, which has the That Chae Haeng positioned on the top.

== Geography ==
Neighboring districts are (from the north clockwise) Santi Suk, Mae Charim, Wiang Sa, and Mueang Nan of Nan Province.

The eastern part of the district is in the Luang Prabang Range mountain area of the Thai highlands.

== Administration ==
The district is divided into seven sub-districts (tambons), which are further subdivided into 61 villages (mubans). There are no municipal (thesaban) areas, and seven tambon administrative organizations (TAO).

No.	Name	Thai name	Villages	Pop.
1.	Muang Tuet	ม่วงตึ๊ด	5	4,267
2.	Na Pang	นาปัง	6	3,567
3.	Nam Kaen	น้ำแก่น	10	4,266
4.	Nam Kian	น้ำเกี๋ยน	5	2,712
5.	Mueang Chang	เมืองจัง	11	6,164
6.	Tha Nao	ท่าน้าว	7	3,418
7.	Fai Kaeo	ฝายแก้ว	17	10,838
