= Santi Suk district =

Santi Suk สันติสุข
- District
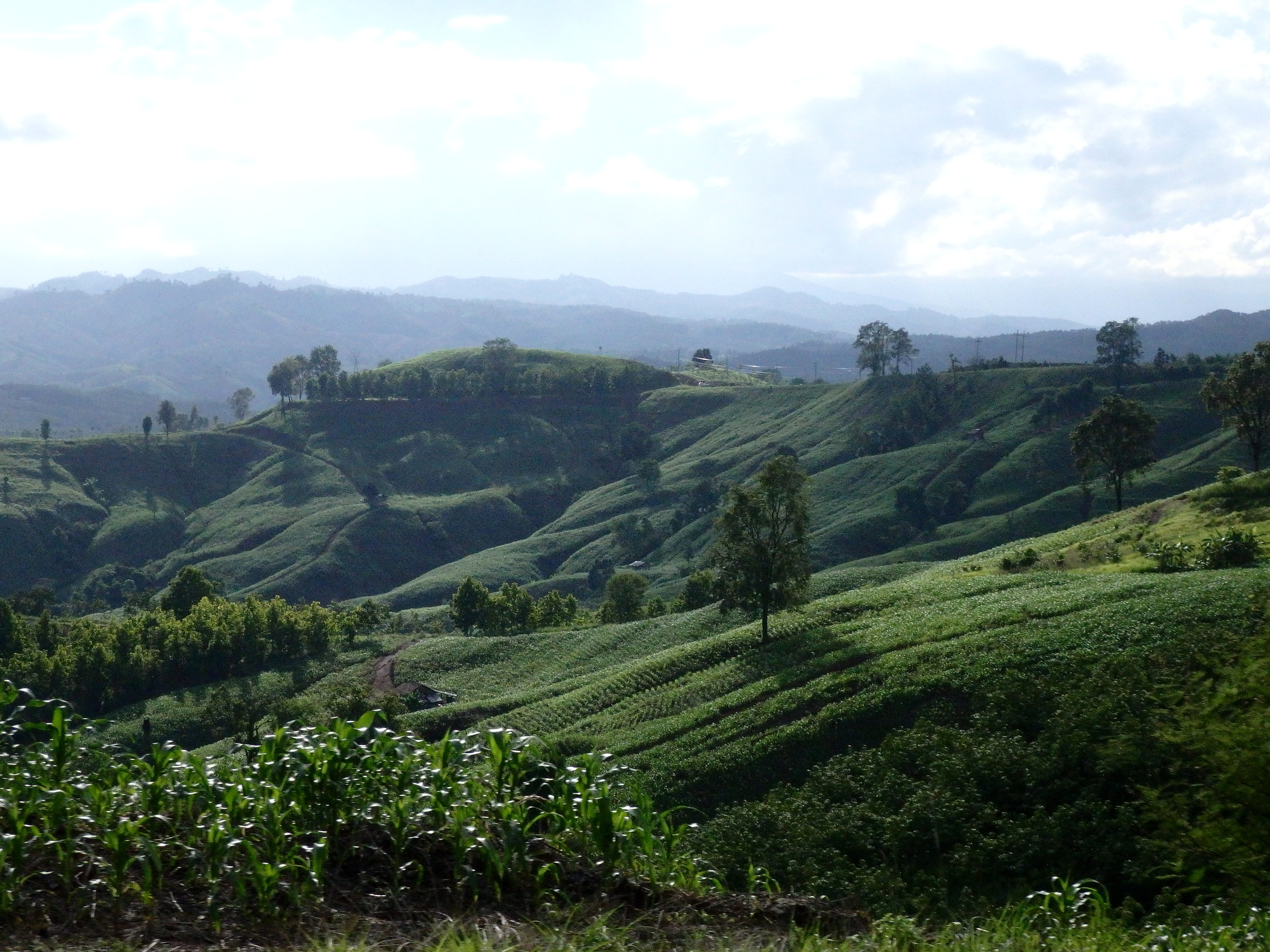
- Pa Laeo Luang forest

- District location in Nan province
- Coordinates: 18°54′48″N 100°56′29″E
- Country: Thailand
- Province: Nan

Government
  - Marshal: Pitsanu Sawangsap

Area
  - Total: 416.837 km^{2} (160.942 sq mi)

Population (2009)
  - Total: 15,695
  - Density: 37.653/km^{2} (97.520/sq mi)
- Time zone: UTC+7 (ICT)
- Postal code: 55000
- Geocode: 5511

Santi Suk (Thai: สันติสุข, pronounced [sǎn.tì(ʔ) sùk]; Northern Thai: ᨽᩢᨶᩥ᩠ᨲᨽᩩᨡ᩺, [sǎn.tǐsǔk]) is a district (amphoe) in the central part of Nan province, northern Thailand.

== History ==
The minor district (king amphoe) Santi Suk was established on 15 June 1981, when the two tambons Du Phong and Pa Laeo Luang were split off from Mueang Nan district. The third tambon, Phong, was assigned from Mae Charim district on 21 April 1983. The minor district was upgraded to a full district on 4 July 1994.

== Geography ==
Neighboring districts are, from the north clockwise, Tha Wang Pha, Pua, Bo Kluea, Mae Charim, Phu Phiang and Mueang Nan.

The eastern part of the district is in the Luang Prabang Range mountain area of the Thai highlands.

== Administration ==
The district is divided into three sub-districts (tambons), which are further subdivided into 31 villages (mubans). There are no municipal (thesaban) areas, and three tambon administrative organizations (TAO).

No.	Name	Thai name	Villages	Pop.
1.	Du Phong	ดู่พงษ์	8	5,022
2.	Pa Laeo Luang	ป่าแลวหลวง	10	4,513
3.	Phong	พงษ์	13	6,154
