= Mueang Nan district =

Mueang Nan เมืองน่าน
- District
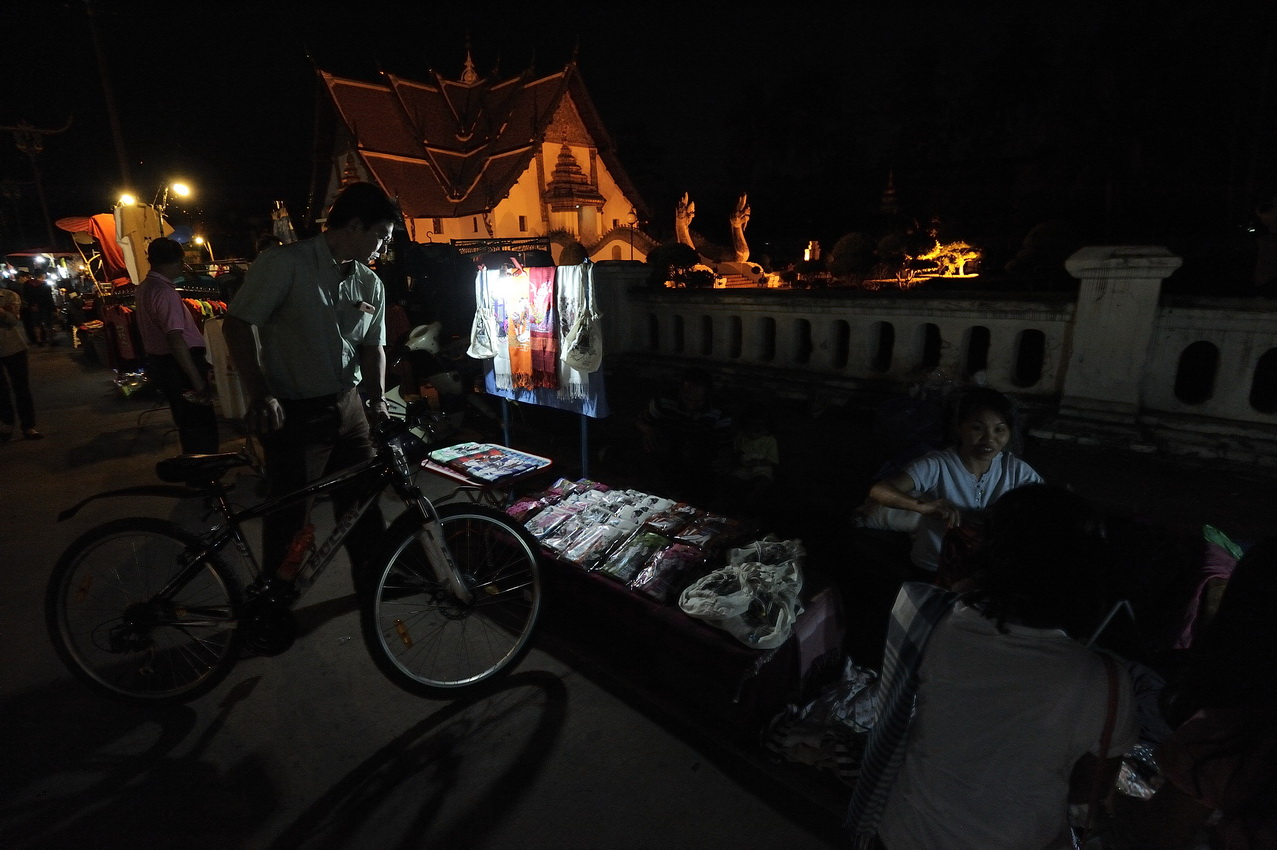
- A local street vendor by the Wat Phumin at night

- District location in Nan province
- Coordinates: 18°47′37″N 100°43′46″E
- Country: Thailand
- Province: Nan

Government
  - Marshal: Winai Sitthimonton

Area
  - Total: 813.126 km^{2} (313.950 sq mi)

Population (2010)
  - Total: 81,481
  - Density: 100.21/km^{2} (259.54/sq mi)
- Time zone: UTC+7 (ICT)
- Postal code: 55000
- Geocode: 5501

Mueang Nan (Thai: เมืองน่าน, pronounced [mɯ̄a̯ŋ nâːn]) is the capital district (amphoe mueang) of Nan province, northern Thailand.

== History ==
The district was Khwaeng Nakhon Nan, set up in 1899 by the Ministry of Interior. It was renamed Mueang Nan District in 1917. Khun Yommana Nattikan was the first district officer.

== Geography ==
Neighboring districts are from the north clockwise Tha Wang Pha, Santi Suk, Phu Phiang, Wiang Sa, Ban Luang of Nan Province and Pong of Phayao province.

== Tourist Attractions ==
- Nan National Museum
- Nan City Pillar
- Old city walls
- Tham Phatup Forest Park
- Ancient Kiln Site
- Doi Luang Waterfall
- Song Kwae Waterfall
- Doi Mok Waterfall
- Huai Son Waterfall
- Doi Tee Doo
- Hin Khao Beach
- Chalermprakiat Astronomy Learning Center and Observatory
- Home of the Fongkham Lord
- Ban Phra Koet Community Museum
- Nan Riverside Art Gallery
- Phingphruek Art Gallery
- Nan City Identity Hall

== Administration ==
Mueang Nan District comprises 7 sub-district administrative organizations (tambons): Tambon Bo, Tambon Thum Tong, Tambon Rueang, Tambon Na Saw, Tambon Bo Suak, Tambon Sa Nian, and Tambon Pha Sing (outside the Mueang Nan Municipality); 2 sub-district municipalities (thesaban tambon): Tambon Du Tai and Tambon Kong Khwai; and 2 city municipalities (thesaban mueang): Mueang Nan Municipality (Tambon Nai Wiang + Tambon Pha Sing) and Mueang Chaiyathan Municipality. Mueang Nan District has a total of 137 communities and villages (mubans).

Mueang Nan District is divided into 11 sub-districts and has a total of 137 communities or villages, as follows:

No.	Name	Thai	Villages	Population	Area (km2)
1.	Nai Wiang	ในเวียง	-	19,684	
2.	Bo	บ่อ	10	4,393	
3.	Pha Sing	ผาสิงห์	9	6,144	
4.	Chai Sathan	ไชยสถาน	11	7,106	
5.	Thuem Tong	ถืมตอง	8	3,336	
6.	Rueang	เรือง	8	4,853	
7.	Na Sao	นาซาว	6	3,578	
8.	Du Tai	ดู่ใต้	15	8,456	
9.	Kong Khwai	กองควาย	12	5,549	
16.	Bo Suak	บ่อสวก	13	6,546	
17.	Sanian	สะเนียน	15	11,836	

Missing numbers are tambon which now form Phu Phiang District.
