= Bo Kluea district =

Bo Kluea บ่อเกลือ
- District
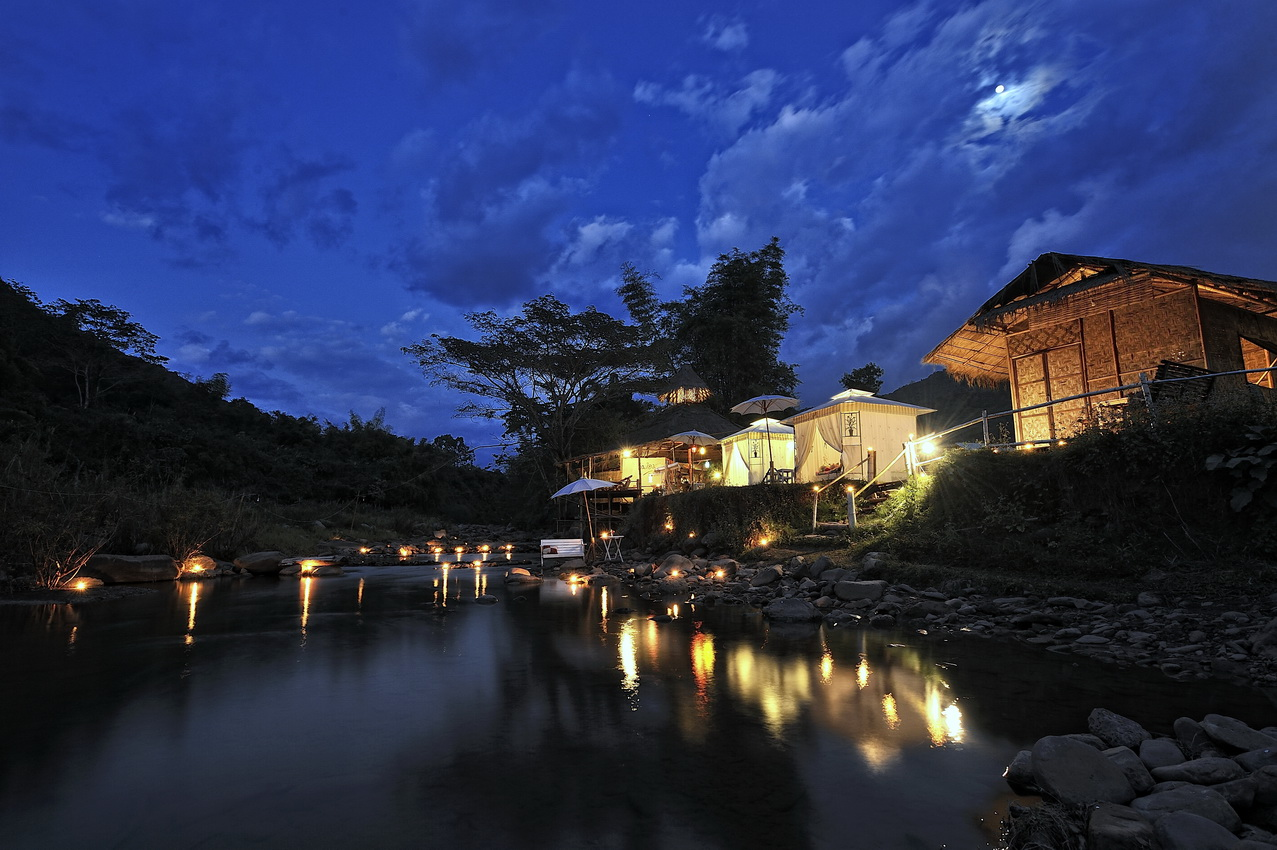
- A resort by the river in Bo Kluea

- District location in Nan province
- Coordinates: 19°8′56″N 101°9′27″E
- Country: Thailand
- Province: Nan

Government
  - Marshal: Somrob Pitikawong

Area
  - Total: 848.341 km^{2} (327.546 sq mi)

Population (2009)
  - Total: 14,326
  - Density: 16.887/km^{2} (43.737/sq mi)
- Time zone: UTC+7 (ICT)
- Postal code: 55000
- Geocode: 5512

Bo Kluea (Thai: บ่อเกลือ, pronounced [bɔ̀ː klɯ̄a]; Northern Thai: ᨷᩴᩴ᩵ᩬᩮᨠᩥᩬᩖᩋ, pronounced [bɔ̀ː kɯ̌a]) is a district (amphoe) in the eastern part of Nan province, northern Thailand.

== History ==
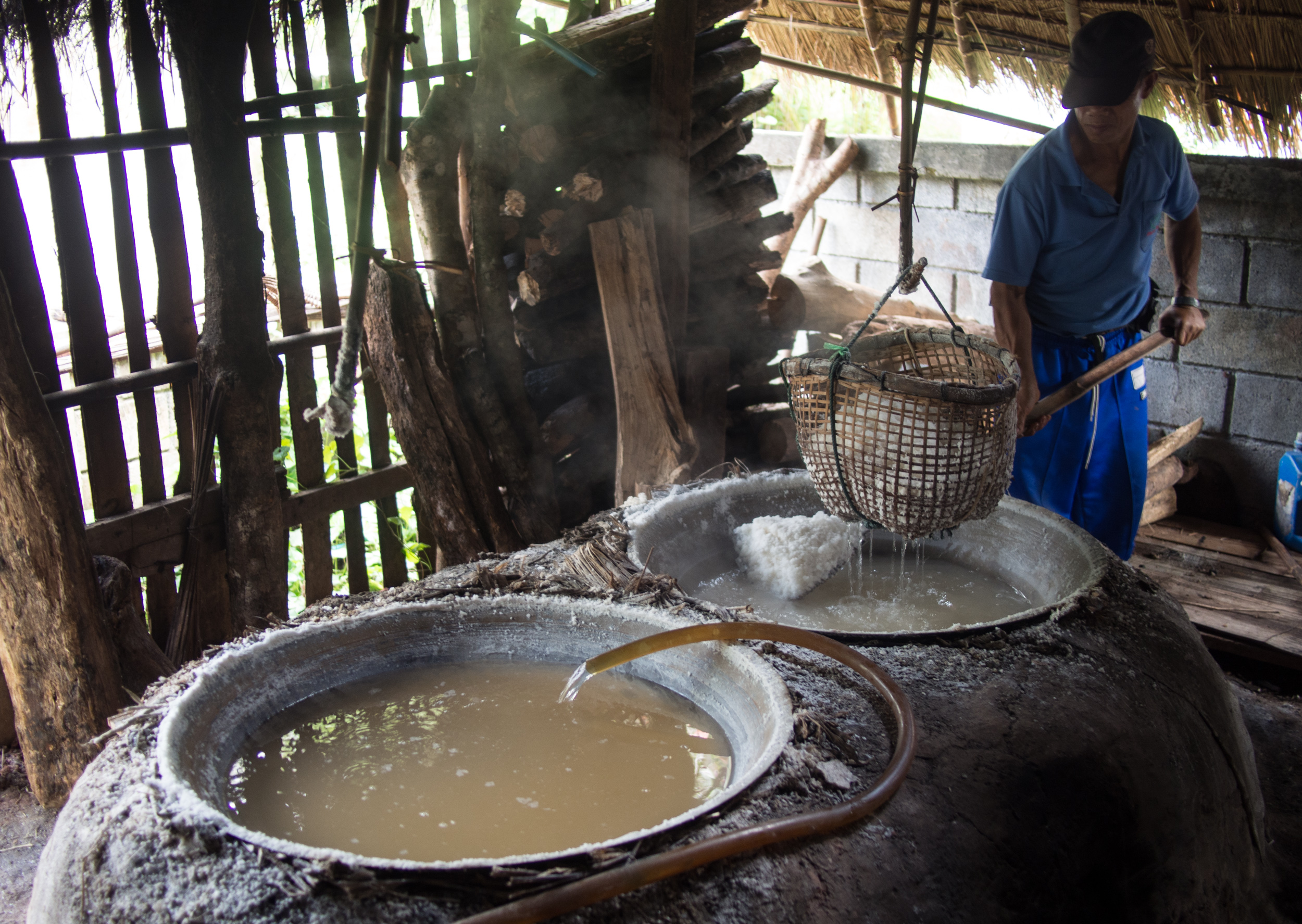
Salt is still produced in the traditional way in Bo Kluea

The minor district (king amphoe) Bo Kluea was established on 5 February 1988 by splitting the two tambons Bo Kluea Nuea and Bo Kluea Tai from Pua district. It was upgraded to a full district on 7 September 1995.

== Geography ==
Neighboring districts are from the south clockwise Mae Charim, Santi Suk, Pua and Chaloem Phra Kiat of Nan Province. To the east is Xaignabouli of Laos.

The district is in the Luang Prabang Range mountain area of the Thai highlands.

== Economy ==
The district is known for its ancient salt wells from which salt is produced from the evaporation of brine. The salt wells had been active since the time of the Nan Kingdom

== Administration ==
The district is divided into four sub-districts (tambons), which are further subdivided into 39 villages (mubans). There are no municipal (thesaban) areas, and four tambon administrative organizations (TAO).

No.	Name	Thai name	Villages	Pop.
1.	Bo Kluea Nuea	บ่อเกลือเหนือ	11	3,422
2.	Bo Kluea Tai	บ่อเกลือใต้	15	4,929
4.	Phu Fa	ภูฟ้า	6	2,846
5.	Dong Phaya	ดงพญา	7	3,174

The missing number 3 belongs to tambon Khun Nan which is now part of Chaloem Phra Kiat District.
