= Wiang Sa district, Nan =

Wiang Sa เวียงสา
- District
- District location in Nan province
- Coordinates: 18°35′54″N 100°44′24″E
- Country: Thailand
- Province: Nan

Government
  - Chief District Officer: Jatuporn Chanasri

Area
  - Total: 1,894.893 km^{2} (731.622 sq mi)

Population (2015)
  - Total: 70,895
  - Density: 37.414/km^{2} (96.901/sq mi)
- Time zone: UTC+7 (ICT)
- Postal code: 55110
- Geocode: 5507

Wiang Sa (Thai: เวียงสา, pronounced [wīa̯ŋ sǎː]) is a district (amphoe) in the central part of Nan province, northern Thailand.

== Geography ==
Neighboring districts are, from the south clockwise: Na Noi, Ban Luang, Mueang Nan, Phu Phiang of Nan Province, Rong Kwang, Song of Phrae province. To the east it borders Xaignabouli province of Laos.

The eastern part of the district is in the Luang Prabang Range mountain area of the Thai highlands.

== History ==
The minor district Mueang Sa was created in 1908, consisting of the seven tambons (sub-districts): Mueang Sa, Ai Na Lai, Ban San, Ban Khueng, Pong Sanuk, Nam Khao, and Lai Na split off from Mueang Nan District. In 1909 it was upgraded to a full district. In 1917 it was renamed Phun Yuen (บุญยืน), as the district office was in that tambon. In 1939 it was again renamed with its historical name, only leaving out the word Mueang which was reserved for the capital districts of provinces. The district was renamed Wiang Sa on 23 January 1986.

== Administration ==
=== Central administration ===
Wiang Sa is divided into 17 sub-districts (tambons), which are further subdivided into 128 administrative villages (mubans).

No.	Name	Thai	Villages	Pop.
1.	Klang Wiang	กลางเวียง	15	10,791
2.	Khueng	ขึ่ง	7	4,069
3.	Lai Nan	ไหล่น่าน	8	3,472
4.	Tan Chum	ตาลชุม	7	3,824
5.	Na Lueang	นาเหลือง	7	3,112
6.	San	ส้าน	10	7,065
7.	Nam Muap	น้ำมวบ	8	3,346
8.	Nam Pua	น้ำปั้ว	7	4,054
9.	Yap Hua Na	ยาบหัวนา	7	5,122
10.	Pong Sanuk	ปงสนุก	4	1,366
11.	Ai Na Lai	อ่ายนาไลย	11	6,830
12.	San Na Nong Mai	ส้านนาหนองใหม่	4	1,902
13.	Mae Khaning	แม่ขะนิง	7	3,768
14.	Mae Sakhon	แม่สาคร	6	2,772
15.	Chom Chan	จอมจันทร์	8	3,973
16.	Mae Sa	แม่สา	7	2,945
17.	Thung Si Thong	ทุ่งศรีทอง	5	2,484

=== Local administration ===
There are three sub-district municipalities (thesaban tambons) in the district:

- Wiang Sa (Thai: เทศบาลตำบลเวียงสา) consisting of parts of sub-district Klang Wiang.
- Klang Wiang (Thai: เทศบาลตำบลกลางเวียง) consisting of sub-district Pong Sanuk and parts of sub-district Klang Wiang.
- Khueng (Thai: เทศบาลตำบลขึ่ง) consisting of sub-district Khueng.

There are 13 sub-district administrative organizations (SAO) in the district:

- Lai Nan (Thai: องค์การบริหารส่วนตำบลไหล่น่าน) consisting of sub-district Lai Nan.
- Tan Chum (Thai: องค์การบริหารส่วนตำบลตาลชุม) consisting of sub-district Tan Chum.
- Na Lueang (Thai: องค์การบริหารส่วนตำบลนาเหลือง) consisting of sub-district Na Lueang.
- San (Thai: องค์การบริหารส่วนตำบลส้าน) consisting of sub-district San.
- Nam Muap (Thai: องค์การบริหารส่วนตำบลน้ำมวบ) consisting of sub-district Nam Muap, San Na Nong Mai.
- Nam Pua (Thai: องค์การบริหารส่วนตำบลน้ำปั้ว) consisting of sub-district Nam Pua.
- Yap Hua Na (Thai: องค์การบริหารส่วนตำบลยาบหัวนา) consisting of sub-district Yap Hua Na.
- Ai Na Lai (Thai: องค์การบริหารส่วนตำบลอ่ายนาไลย) consisting of sub-district Ai Na Lai.
- Mae Khaning (Thai: องค์การบริหารส่วนตำบลแม่ขะนิง) consisting of sub-district Mae Khaning.
- Mae Sakhon (Thai: องค์การบริหารส่วนตำบลแม่สาคร) consisting of sub-district Mae Sakhon.
- Chom Chan (Thai: องค์การบริหารส่วนตำบลจอมจันทร์) consisting of sub-district Chom Chan.
- Mae Sa (Thai: องค์การบริหารส่วนตำบลแม่สา) consisting of sub-district Mae Sa.
- Thung Si Thong (Thai: องค์การบริหารส่วนตำบลทุ่งศรีทอง) consisting of sub-district Thung Si Thong.
