= Nan province =

Nan น่าน ᨶᩣ᩠᩵ᨶ
- Province
- จังหวัดน่าน · ᨧᩢ᩠ᨦᩉ᩠ᩅᩢᨶᩣ᩠᩵ᨶ
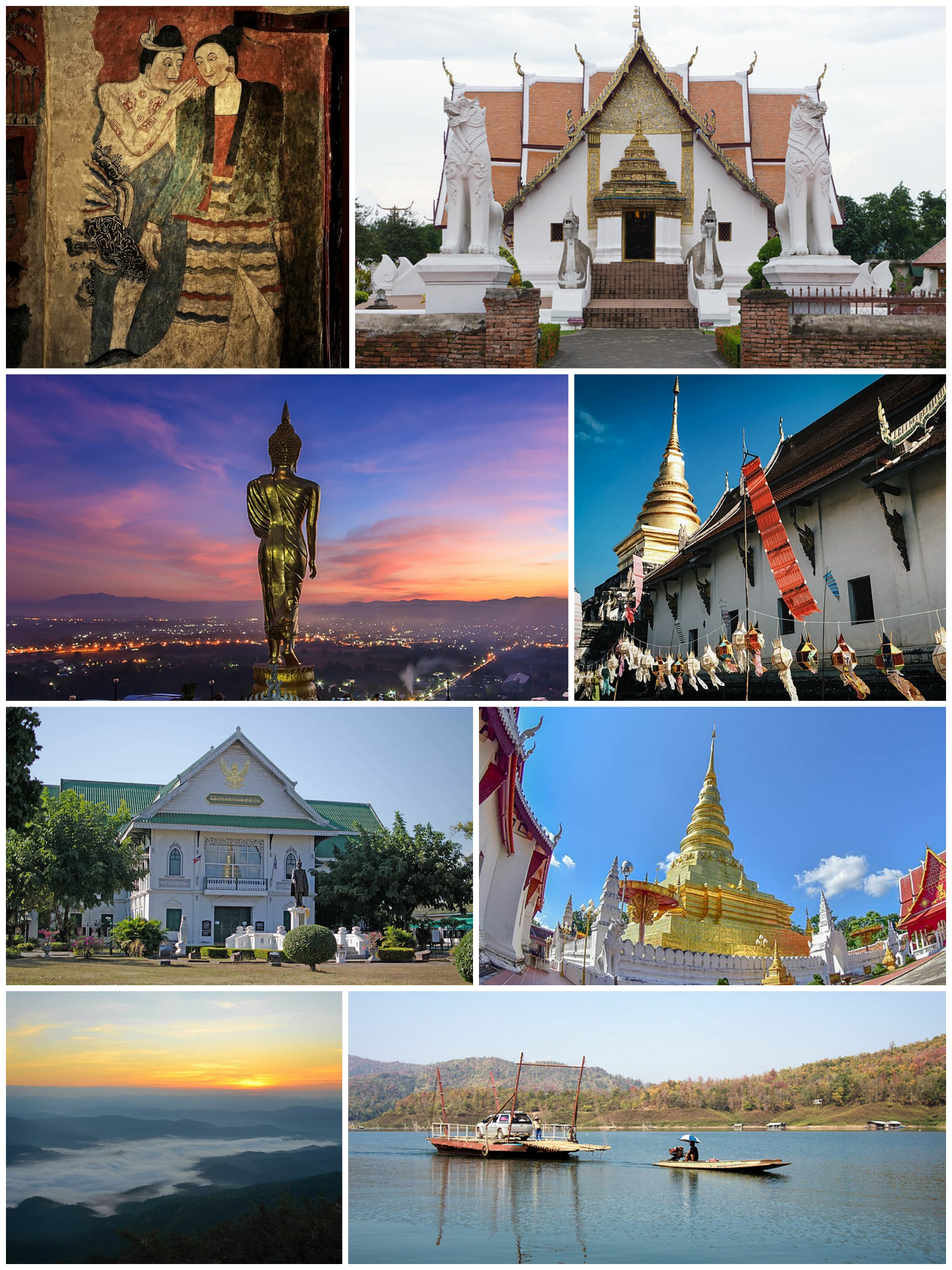
- (from top left, clockwise) – "Kra Sib Ruk" murals in Wat Phumin, Quadra-façade Ubosot of Wat Phumin, Wat Phra That Chang Kham, Wat Phra That Chae Haeng, Sirikit Dam, Si Nan National Park, National Museum of Nan, Leela Buddha of Wat Phra That Khao Noi

- Flag Seal
- Mottoes: แข่งเรือลือเลื่อง เมืองงาช้างดำ จิตรกรรมวัดภูมินทร์ แดนดินส้มสีทอง เรืองรองพระธาตุแช่แห้ง ("Famous boat racing. City of black ivory. Wat Phumin's paintings. Land of the golden oranges. Brilliant Phra That Chae Haeng.")
- Map of Thailand highlighting Nan province
- Coordinates: 18°46′04.07″N 100°46′56.74″E
- Country: Thailand
- Capital: Nan (town)

Government
  - Type: Province and Provincial Administrative Organization
  - Body: Nan Province and Nan Provincial Administrative Organization
  - Governor: Chainarong Wongyai
  - PAO Chief Executive: Nopparat Thawong

Area
  - Total: 12,130 km^{2} (4,680 sq mi)
  - Rank: 11th

Population (2024)
  - Total: ▼470,507
  - Rank: 58th
  - Density: 39/km^{2} (100/sq mi)
  - Rank: 76th

Human Achievement Index
  - HAI (2022): 0.6496 "somewhat high" Ranked 26th

GDP
  - Total: baht 31 billion (US$1.1 billion) (2019)
- Time zone: UTC+7 (ICT)
- Postal code: 55xxx
- Calling code: 054
- ISO 3166 code: TH-55
- Website: nan.go.th nanpao.go.th

Nan province
- "Nan" in Thai language (top) and Northern Thai with Tai Tham script (bottom)

Thai name
- Thai: น่าน
- RTGS: Nan

Northern Thai name
- Northern Thai: ᨶᩣ᩠᩵ᨶ (Nan)

Nan (Thai: น่าน, pronounced [nâːn]; Northern Thai: ᨶᩣ᩠᩵ᨶ) is one of Thailand's seventy-six provinces (changwat), and lies in upper northern Thailand. Neighboring provinces are (from south clockwise): Uttaradit, Phrae, and Phayao. To the north and east it borders Sainyabuli of Laos.

Nan was inducted into the UNESCO Creative Cities Network for the City of Crafts and Folk Arts in 2025.

== Geography ==
The province is in the remote Nan River valley, surrounded by forested mountains, the Phlueng Range in the western part and the Luang Prabang Range in the east. The highest mountain is the 2,079 meter high Phu Khe in Bo Kluea District, northeast of the city of Nan towards the border with Laos. The total forest area is 7,436 km^{2} (2,871 sq mi) or 61.3 percent of provincial area.

=== National parks ===
There are ten national parks in region 13 (Phrae), of which seven national parks are in Nan province. (Visitors in fiscal year 2024)

| Doi Phu Kha National Park | 1,704 km^{2} (658 sq mi) | (28,945) |
| Si Nan National Park | 1,024 km^{2} (395 sq mi) | (38,495) |
| Mae Charim National Park | 432 km^{2} (167 sq mi) | (6,251) |
| Nanthaburi National Park | 427 km^{2} (165 sq mi) | (5,121) |
| Khun Sathan National Park | 342 km^{2} (132 sq mi) | (21,074) |
| Tham Sakoen National Park | 250 km^{2} (97 sq mi) | (5,224) |
| Khun Nan National Park | 249 km^{2} (96 sq mi) | (3,044) |

=== Wildlife Sanctuaries ===
The two wildlife sanctuaries in region 13 (Phrae) are not in Nan province.

=== Location protected areas ===
Overview of protected areas of Nan

Nan protected areas

| | National park |
| 1 | Doi Phu Kha |
| 2 | Khun Nan |
| 3 | Khun Sathan |
| 4 | Mae Charim |
| 5 | Nanthaburi |
| 6 | Si Nan |
| 7 | Tham Sakoen |

== Environmental issues ==
Nan and government forestry officials are concerned about deforestation after hill tribes turned 1.5 million rai of forest land into cornfields. Nan Governor, Mr Suwat, says officials have attempted to persuade hill tribes to grow perennial plants such as cashew nuts and bamboo in the forest legally. "It's impossible to solve the deforestation problem without involving the hill tribes," he says. "We must give them a solution to live in the forest and protect nature at the same time."

== Climate ==
Nan province has a tropical savanna climate (Köppen climate classification Aw). Winters are quite dry and very warm. Temperatures rise until April, which is very hot with the average daily maximum at 37.0 °C (98.6 °F). The monsoon season runs from late April through October, with heavy rain and somewhat cooler temperatures during the day, although nights remain warm.

== History ==
For centuries Nan was an independent kingdom founded by the Kao People but, due to its remoteness, it had few connections to the other kingdoms. The first kingdom around the city Mueang Pua (also known as Woranakorn) was created in the late-13th century. Its rulers, the Phukha dynasty, were related to the founders of Vientiane, however it became associated with the Sukhothai Kingdom as it was easier to reach from the south than from the east or west. In the 14th century the capital was moved to its present location at Nan.

In the 15th century, when Sukhothai declined in power, it became vassal of the kingdom of Lan Na. In 1443 King Inthakanthao of Nan Kingdom plotted to capture neighboring Phayao by asking King Tilokaraj to help him fight against Vietnamese troops attacking Nan, even though there was no such threat. King Inthakanthao killed the king of Phayao, however the troops of Tilokaraj then attacked Nan itself, and captured it in 1449.

Between 1560–1785, Nan was colonized by Burma many times. Nan was also an abandoned city without people twice: first from 1704–1706, and later in 1778–1801.

When Lannathai was under Burmese rule, Nan tried to liberate itself many times without success, which finally led to Burmese rule of Nan in 1714. In 1788 the Burmese rulers were finally driven out. Nan had to then accept new rulers from Siam. In 1893 after the Paknam crisis Siam had to give a big part of eastern Nan to French Indochina. In 1899 mueang Nan became part of the circle (Monthon) Tawan Tok Chiang Nuea (northwestern circle). In 1916 the northwestern circle was split and Nan was assigned to the circle Maharat. When the circles were abolished in 1932, the provinces including Nan became top-level subdivisions of Siam.

Before the early-1980s, bandits as well as People's Liberation Army of Thailand (PLAT) guerrillas were a big problem in the province, usually destroying highway construction overnight. With the help of the army and the more stable political system the province improved significantly, but is still a very rural and remote area.

In August 2024, many provinces in the north experienced flooding. For Nan, it was considered the worst flooding in 100 years.

== Demographics ==
Hill tribes constitute 10.5 percent of the population. Inhabitants known as the T'in or Mal people speak a Northern Mon-Khmer or Khmuic language, T'in, an unknown language when Gérard Diffloth's classifications were widely cited in a 1974 Encyclopædia Britannica article.

== Symbols ==
The provincial seal shows a Usuparatch bull carrying the stupa of Phra That Chae Haeng. The buffalo dates back to a legend that the rulers of Nan and Phrae were brothers, and met at a mountain to decide about the boundary between their lands. The ruler of Nan went there on a buffalo, while the ruler of Phrae went there on a horse.

The provincial tree and provincial flower is the Orchid Tree (Bauhinia variegata). Hypsibarbus vernayi is the provincial aquatic life, what with they swim upstream to spawns in the water source in the forestland of Bo Kluea district. An unseen natural phenomenon that occurs only once a year during the Buddhist holy days of March.

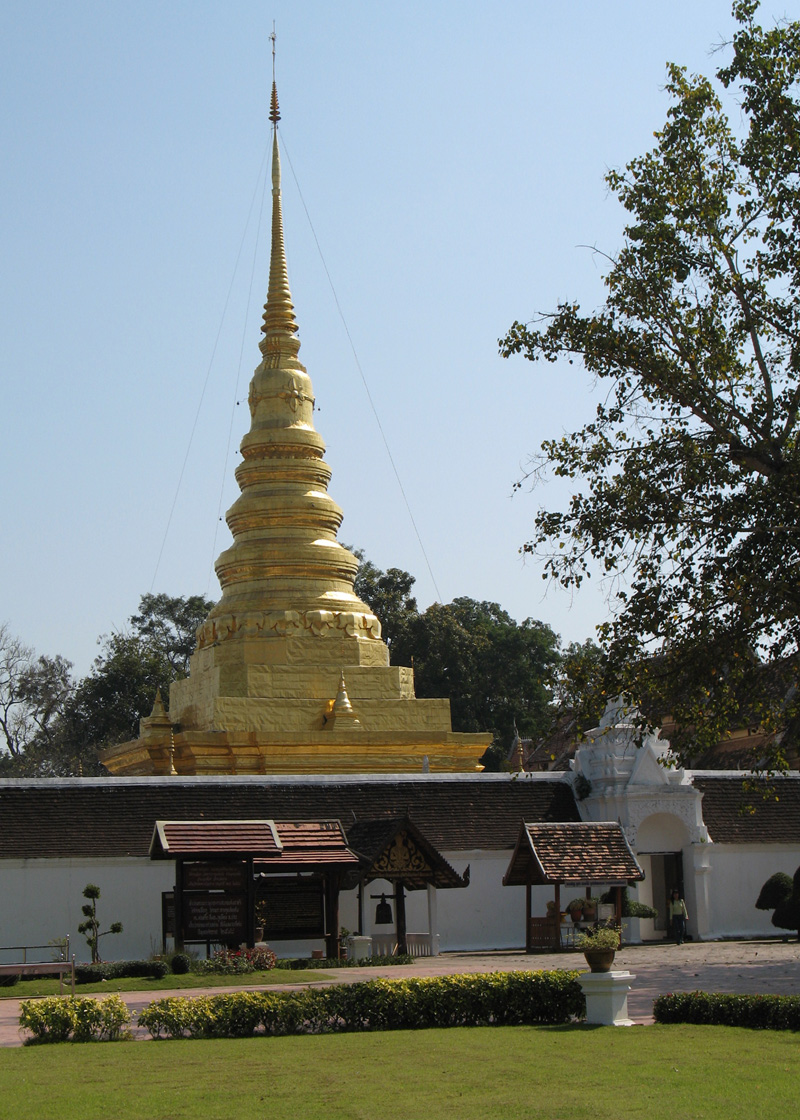
Phra That Chae Haeng

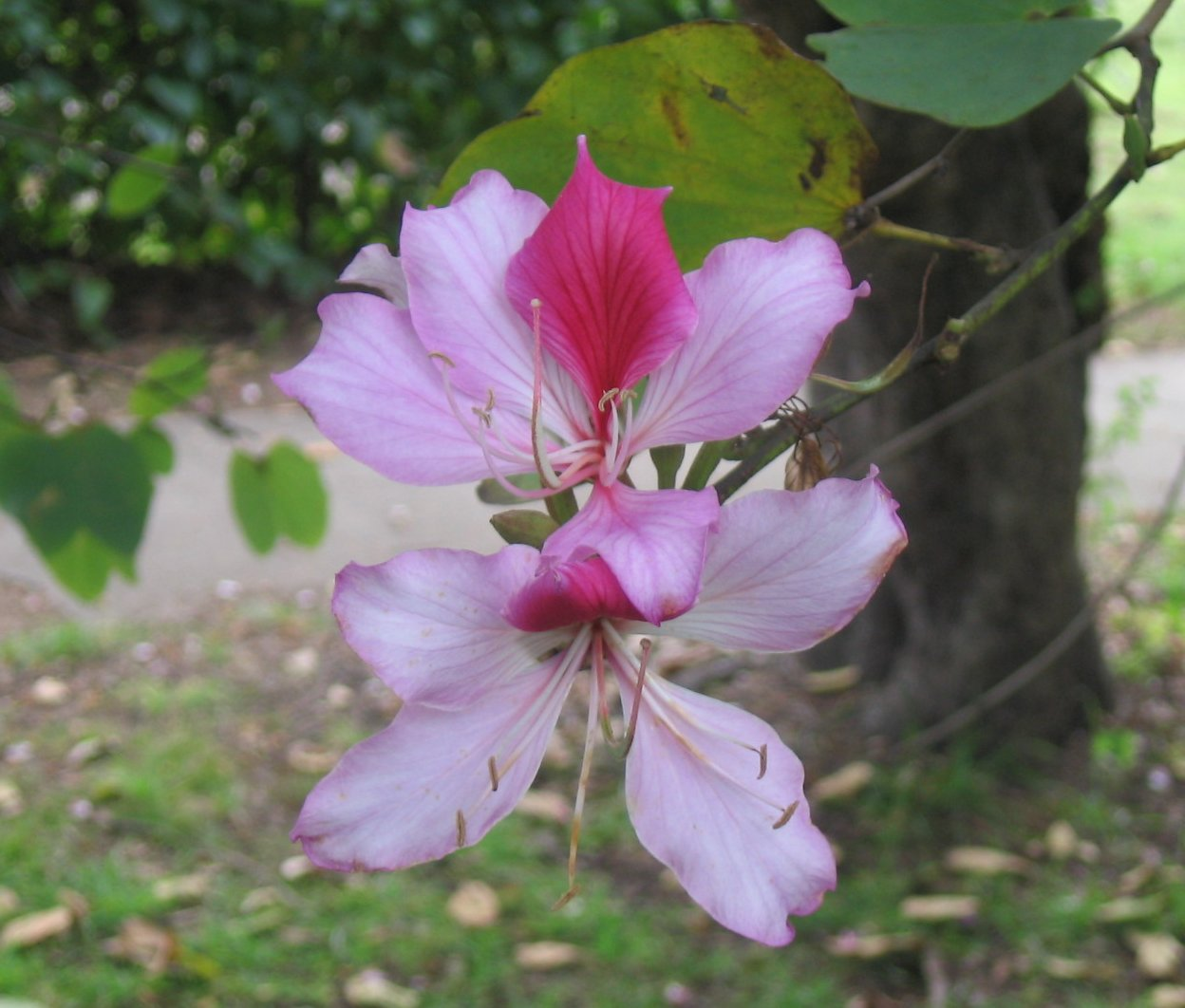
Orchid Tree flower

== Administrative divisions ==
Map of 15 districts

=== Provincial government ===
The province is divided into 15 districts (amphoe). These are further divided into 99 subdistricts (tambons) and 848 villages (mubans).

แบ่งการปกครองแบ่งออกเป็น 15 อำเภอ 99 ตำบล 893 หมู่บ้าน ได้แก่

| Number | District Name (amphoe) | | District (tambons) | Village (mubans) | House | Area (km2) | Population | | |
| Number | Thai | English | District (tambons) | Village (mubans) | House | Area (km2) | Man | Woman | Total |
|---|---|---|---|---|---|---|---|---|---|
| 1. | | | 11 | 140 | 38,127 | 813.126 | 40,677 | 41,247 | 81,914 |
| 1. | เมืองน่าน | Mueang Nan | 11 | 140 | 38,127 | 813.126 | 40,677 | 41,247 | 81,914 |
| 2. | | | 5 | 38 | 5,001 | 998.152 | 8,334 | 8,018 | 16,352 |
| 2. | แม่จริม | Mae Charim | 5 | 38 | 5,001 | 998.152 | 8,334 | 8,018 | 16,352 |
| 3. | | | 4 | 26 | 4,027 | 338.210 | 5,700 | 5,602 | 11,302 |
| 3. | บ้านหลวง | Ban Luang | 4 | 26 | 4,027 | 338.210 | 5,700 | 5,602 | 11,302 |
| 4. | | | 7 | 69 | 11,989 | 1,408.122 | 17,894 | 15,946 | 31,812 |
| 4. | นาน้อย | Na Noi | 7 | 69 | 11,989 | 1,408.122 | 17,894 | 15,946 | 31,812 |
| 5. | | | 12 | 107 | 21,768 | 657.363 | 31,545 | 32‘335 | 63,880 |
| 5. | ปัว | Pua | 12 | 107 | 21,768 | 657.363 | 31,545 | 32‘335 | 63,880 |
| 6. | | | 10 | 91 | 17,894 | 702.204 | 24,831 | 25,280 | 50,111 |
| 6. | ท่าวังผา | Tha Wang Pha | 10 | 91 | 17,894 | 702.204 | 24,831 | 25,280 | 50,111 |
| 7. | | | 17 | 128 | 6,734 | 1,894.893 | 34,307 | 34,399 | 68,706 |
| 7. | เวียงสา | Wiang Sa | 17 | 128 | 6,734 | 1,894.893 | 34,307 | 34,399 | 68,706 |
| 8. | | | 4 | 40 | 26,780 | 760.811 | 9,528 | 9,380 | 18,908 |
| 8. | ทุ่งช้าง | Thung Chang | 4 | 40 | 26,780 | 760.811 | 9,528 | 9,380 | 18,908 |
| 9. | | | 6 | 60 | | 277.115 | | | 27,097 |
| 9. | เชียงกลาง | Chiang Klang | 6 | 60 | | 277.115 | | | 27,097 |
| 10. | | | 4 | 48 | | 785.608 | | | 14,256 |
| 10. | นาหมื่น | Na Muen | 4 | 48 | | 785.608 | | | 14,256 |
| 11. | | | 3 | 31 | | 416.837 | | | 15,681 |
| 11. | สันติสุข | Santi Suk | 3 | 31 | | 416.837 | | | 15,681 |
| 12. | | | 4 | 38 | | 848.341 | | | 15,316 |
| 12. | บ่อเกลือ | Bo Kluea | 4 | 38 | | 848.341 | | | 15,316 |
| 13. | | | 3 | 25 | | 544.364 | | | 12,466 |
| 13. | สองแคว | Song Khwae | 3 | 25 | | 544.364 | | | 12,466 |
| 14. | | | 7 | 61 | | 508.236 | | | 35,929 |
| 14. | ภูเพียง | Phu Phiang | 7 | 61 | | 508.236 | | | 35,929 |
| 15. | | | 2 | 22 | 3,462 | 518.690 | 5,032 | 4,759 | 9,791 |
| 15. | เฉลิมพระเกียรติ | Chaloem Phra Kiat | 2 | 22 | 3,462 | 518.690 | 5,032 | 4,759 | 9,791 |

1. Mueang Nan
2. Mae Charim
3. Ban Luang
4. Na Noi
5. Pua
6. Tha Wang Pha
7. Wiang Sa
8. Thung Chang
9. Chiang Klang
10. Na Muen
11. Santi Suk
12. Bo Kluea
13. Song Khwae
14. Phu Phiang
15. Chaloem Phra Kiat

=== Local government ===
As of 26 November 2019 there are: one Nan Provincial Administration Organisation (ongkan borihan suan changwat) and 19 municipal (thesaban) areas in the province. Nan has town (thesaban mueang) status. Further 18 subdistrict municipalities (thesaban tambon). The non-municipal areas are administered by 80 Subdistrict Administrative Organisations – SAO (ongkan borihan suan tambon).

== Economy ==
=== Economic output ===
In 2022, Nan province had an economic output of 37.616 billion baht (US$990 billion). This amounts to per capita gross provincial product (GPP) of 86,057 baht (US$2,265). In 2024 the total labourforce was 245,287 of which 241,719 persons were employed in economic activity. In agriculture and fishing 127,993 persons (53.0%) were employed and in the non-agricultural sector 113,726 persons (47.0%).

Gross Provincial Product (GPP)
| | Activities | Baht | Percent |
|---|---|---|---|
| 1 | Agriculture and fishing | 10,893,000,000 | 29.0 |
| 2 | Trade | 4,107,000,000 | 10.9 |
| 3 | Education | 3,994,000,000 | 10.6 |
| 4 | Defence + publ.admin. | 3,135,000,000 | 8.3 |
| 5 | Finance | 3,130,000,000 | 8.3 |
| 6 | Manufacturing | 2,963,000,000 | 7.9 |
| 7 | Construction | 2,647,000,000 | 7.0 |
| 8 | Real estate | 2,358,000,000 | 6.3 |
| 9 | Human health | 1,606,000,000 | 4.3 |
| 10 | Transportation | 528,000,000 | 1.4 |
| 11 | Other service activity | 409,000,000 | 1.1 |
| 12 | Energy | 371,000,000 | 1.0 |
| 13 | Information | 368,000,000 | 1.0 |
| 14 | Mining | 336,000,000 | 0.9 |
| 15 | Hotel and restaurant | 281,000,000 | 0.8 |
| 16 | Pastime | 201,000,000 | 0.5 |
| 17 | Administration | 154,000,000 | 0.4 |
| 18 | Water supply | 130,000,000 | 0.3 |
| 19 | Scientific activity | 5,000,000 | 0.0 |
| | Total | 37,616,000,000 | 100 |

Employed persons
| | Activities | Workforce | Percent |
|---|---|---|---|
| 1 | Agriculture and fishing | 127,993 | 53.0 |
| 2 | Other service activity | 24,960 | 10.3 |
| 3 | Trade | 21,882 | 9.1 |
| 4 | Defence + publ.admin. | 12,532 | 5.2 |
| 5 | Manufacturing | 12,436 | 5.1 |
| 6 | Construction | 12,174 | 5.0 |
| 7 | Hotel and restaurant | 8,440 | 3.5 |
| 8 | Education | 6,397 | 2.6 |
| 9 | Finance | 4,784 | 2.0 |
| 10 | Human health | 4,378 | 1.8 |
| 11 | Scientific activity | 2,551 | 1.1 |
| 12 | Transportation | 825 | 0.3 |
| 13 | Mining | 541 | 0.2 |
| 14 | Household enterprise | 482 | 0.2 |
| 15 | Pastime | 472 | 0.2 |
| 16 | Water supply | 291 | 0.1 |
| 17 | Administration | 283 | 0.1 |
| 18 | Information | 240 | 0.1 |
| 19 | Energy | 58 | 0.1 |
| | Total | 241,719 | 100 |

Agriculture is the province's main economic activity, but tourism in 2016 contributed an estimated 30% to the provincial GDP. The number of hotel rooms in Nan has doubled to 4,000 in 2016. The Tourism Department says arrivals to Nan rose by 19% to 1.76 million in 2015, of which Thais numbered 1.44 million. Tourism revenue rose by 14% to 4.43 billion baht. The Tourism Authority of Thailand (TAT) expects tourist arrivals to Nan will rise by 10% to 1.94 million in 2016 as tourism revenue grows by 10% to 4.88 billion baht. "We want only quality tourists, not a big volume", said a spokesman. In 2018 some 939,240 tourists visited Nan, up 4.4% year-on-year, contributing 2.6 billion baht in tourism income, a gain of 8.3%. Most visitors—97%—are Thais, of whom 62% were repeat visitors. Just 3% were foreign tourists from the US, France, China, Japan, and Laos. In the first eight months of 2019 Nan welcomed 643,129 tourists, up 0.2% year-on-year, generating 1.94 billion baht in income, up 2.1%. According to the Bangkok Post, the top two attractions in Nan province are Doi Samer Dao and Wat Phumin, a temple with many "local art masterpieces".

== Human achievement index 2022 ==
| Health | Education | Employment | Income |
| 74 | 50 | 40 | 59 |
| Housing | Family | Transport | Participation |
| 44 | 19 | 33 | 2 |
Province Nan, with an HAI 2022 value of 0.6496 is "somewhat high", occupies place 26 in the ranking.

Since 2003, United Nations Development Programme (UNDP) in Thailand has tracked progress on human development at sub-national level using the Human achievement index (HAI), a composite index covering all the eight key areas of human development. National Economic and Social Development Board (NESDB) has taken over this task since 2017.

| Rank | Classification |
| 1 – 13 | "high" |
| 14–29 | "somewhat high" |
| 30–45 | "average" |
| 46–61 | "somewhat low" |
| 62–77 | "low" |

Map with provinces and HAI 2022 rankings

== Gallery ==
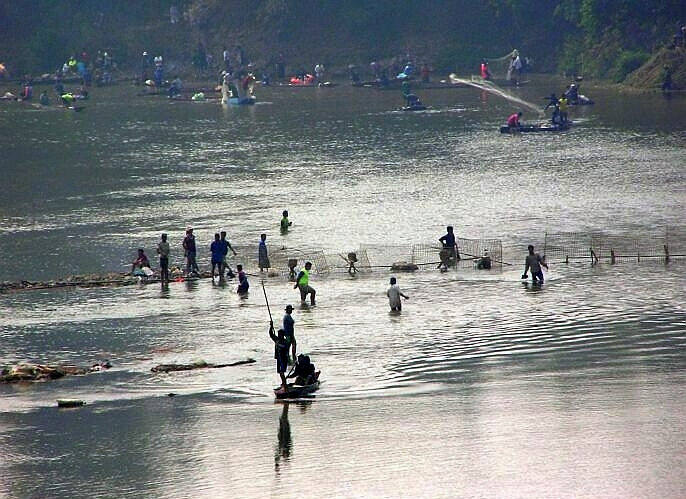
Community fishing, Nan River

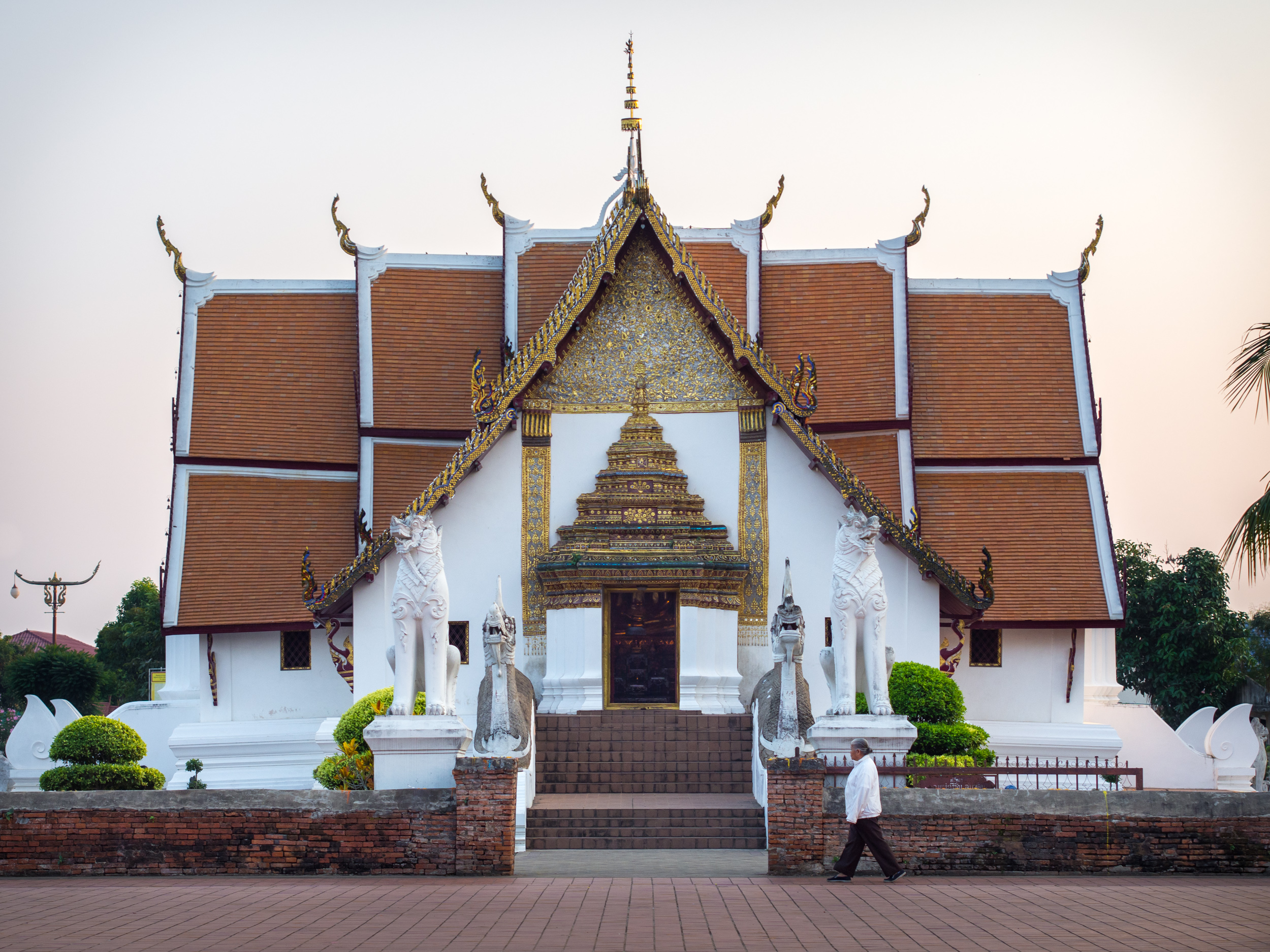
Wat Phumin, Nan

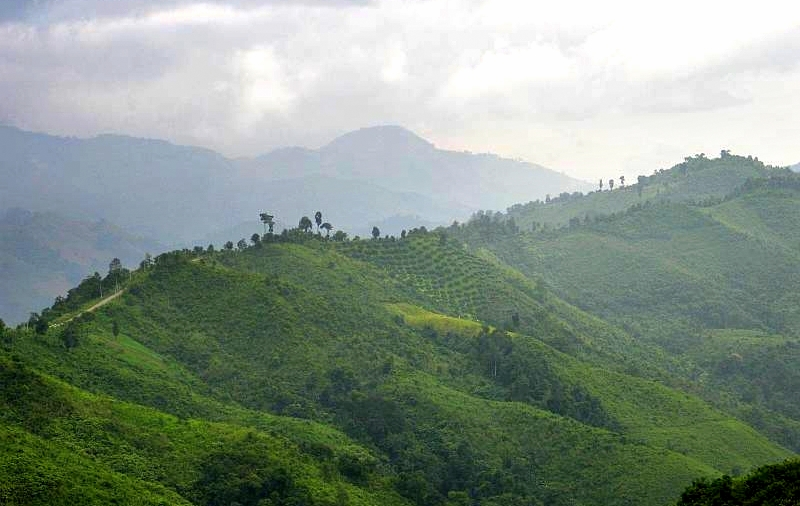
Rte 1256 snaking towards Doi Phu Kha National Park

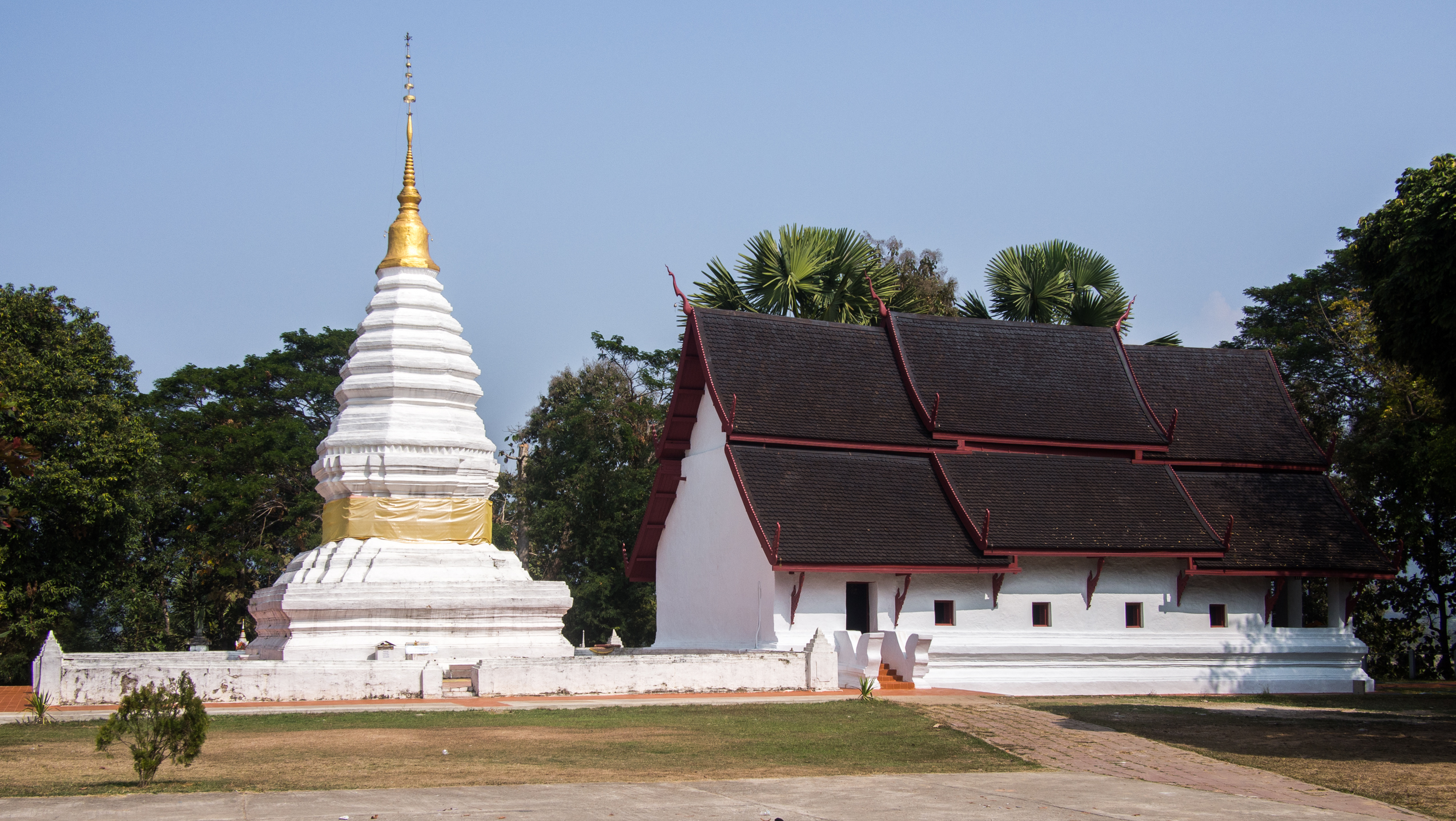
Wat Phrathat Bueng Sakat, Pua District

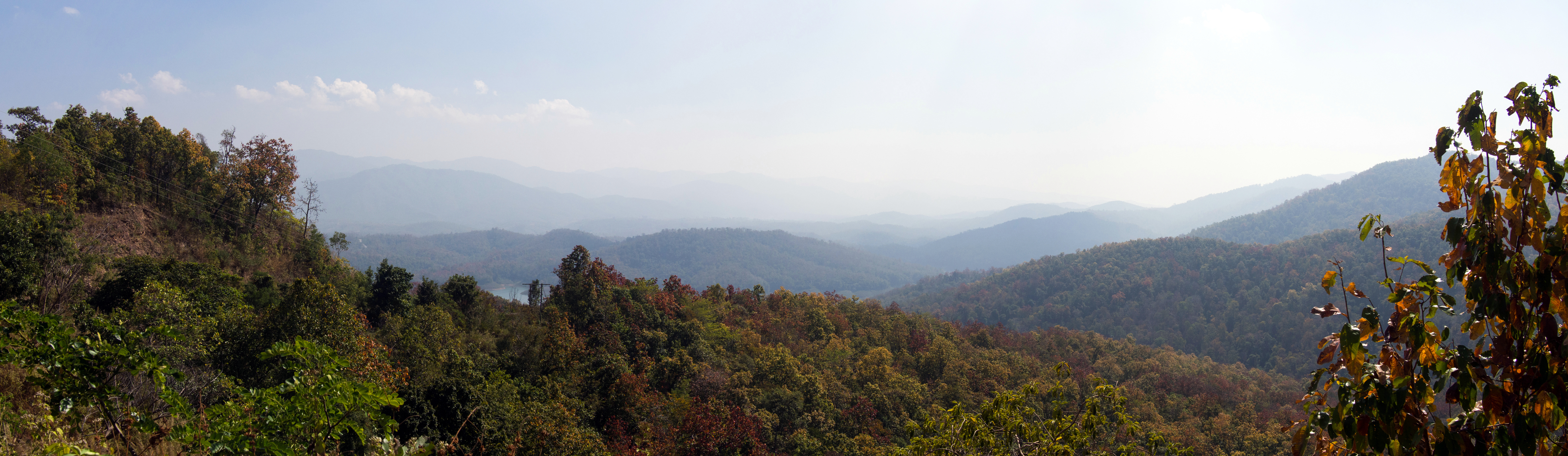
Phi Pan Nam Range, Na Muen District

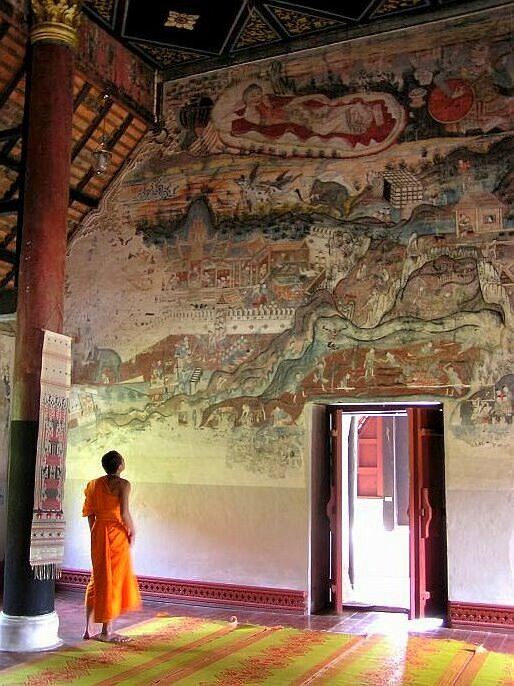
Temple frescoes, Wat Nong Bua, Tha Wang Pha

== See also ==
- Nan Nakhon Airport
