= List of tambon in Thailand (E–F) =

This is a list of tambon (sub-districts) in Thailand, beginning with the letters E and F. This information is liable to change due to border changes or re-allocation of Tambons. Missing Tambon numbers show where the number is either not used or the Tambon has been transferred to a different Amphoe.

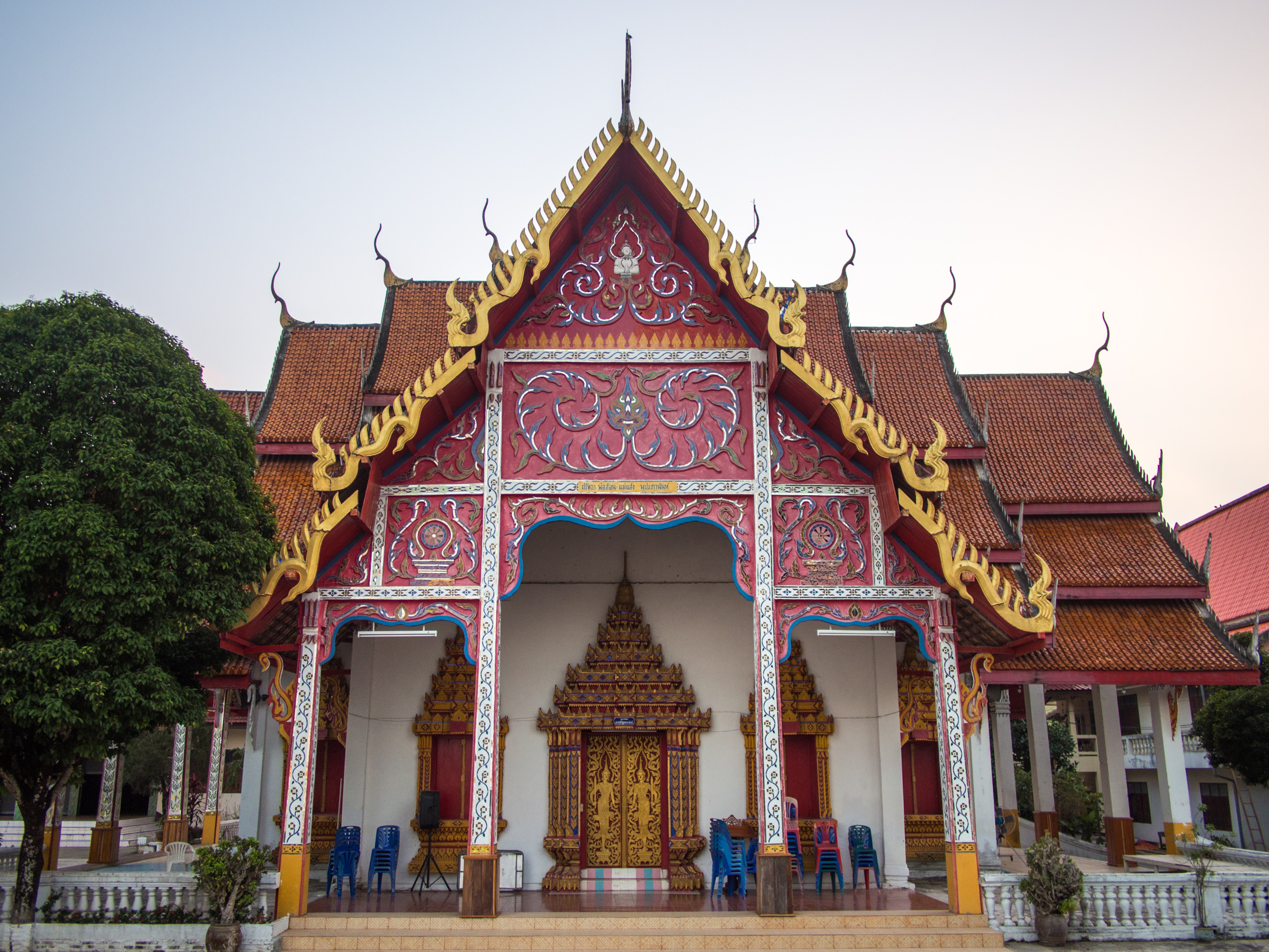
Fai Kaeo, Phu Phiang district, Nan province

Tambon	ตำบล	Amphoe	อำเภอ	Changwat (Province)	จังหวัด	Region
Ekkarat	เอกราช	Pa Mok	ป่าโมก	Ang Thong	อ่างทอง	Central
Erawan	เอราวัณ	Erawan	เอราวัณ	Loei	เลย	North-East
Erawan	เอราวัณ	Waeng	แว้ง	Narathiwat	นราธิวาส	South
Fa Ham	ฟ้าฮ่าม	Mueang Chiang Mai	เมืองเชียงใหม่	Chiang Mai	เชียงใหม่	North
Fai Kaeo	ฝายแก้ว	Phu Phiang	ภูเพียง	Nan	น่าน	North
Fai Kwang	ฝายกวาง	Chiang Kham	ชียงคำ	Phayao	พะเยา	North
Fai Luang	ฝายหลวง	Laplae	ลับแล	Uttaradit	อุตรดิตถ์	North
Fai Na Saeng	ฝายนาแซง	Lom Sak	หล่มสัก	Phetchabun	เพชรบูรณ์	Central
Fak Huai	ฟากห้วย	Aranyaprathet	อรัญประเทศ	Sa Kaeo	สระแก้ว	East
Fak Tha	ฟากท่า	Fak Tha	ฟากท่า	Uttaradit	อุตรดิตถ์	North
Falami	ฝาละมี	Pak Phayun	ปากพะยูน	Phatthalung	พัทลุง	South
Fang Daeng	ฝั่งแดง	That Phanom	ธาตุพนม	Nakhon Phanom	นครพนม	North-East
Fang Daeng	ฝั่งแดง	Na Klang	นากลาง	Nong Bua Lamphu	หนองบัวลำภู	North-East
Fang Kham	ฝางคำ	Sirindhorn	สิรินธร	Ubon Ratchathani	อุบลราชธานี	North-East
Fao Rai	เฝ้าไร่	Fao Rai	เฝ้าไร่	Nong Khai	หนองคาย	North-East

== See also ==
- Organization of the government of Thailand
- List of districts of Thailand
- List of districts of Bangkok
- List of tambon in Thailand
- Provinces of Thailand
- List of municipalities in Thailand
