= Doi Lan =

Doi Lan may refer to:

- Doi Lan (Phi Pan Nam Range) (19°40′30.3″N 99°56′36.6″E), a mountain in Chiang Rai Province
- Doi Lan (Khun Tan Range) (19°46′43.6″N 99°33′47.7″E), a mountain in Chiang Rai Province
- Doi Lan (Mae Hong Son), a mountain in the Daen Lao Range
- Doi Lan Subdistrict of Mueang Chiang Rai District, in Chiang Rai Province, Thailand

== See also ==
- Doi Ian
- Loi Lan
