= Phu Sang district =

Phu Sang ภูซาง
- District
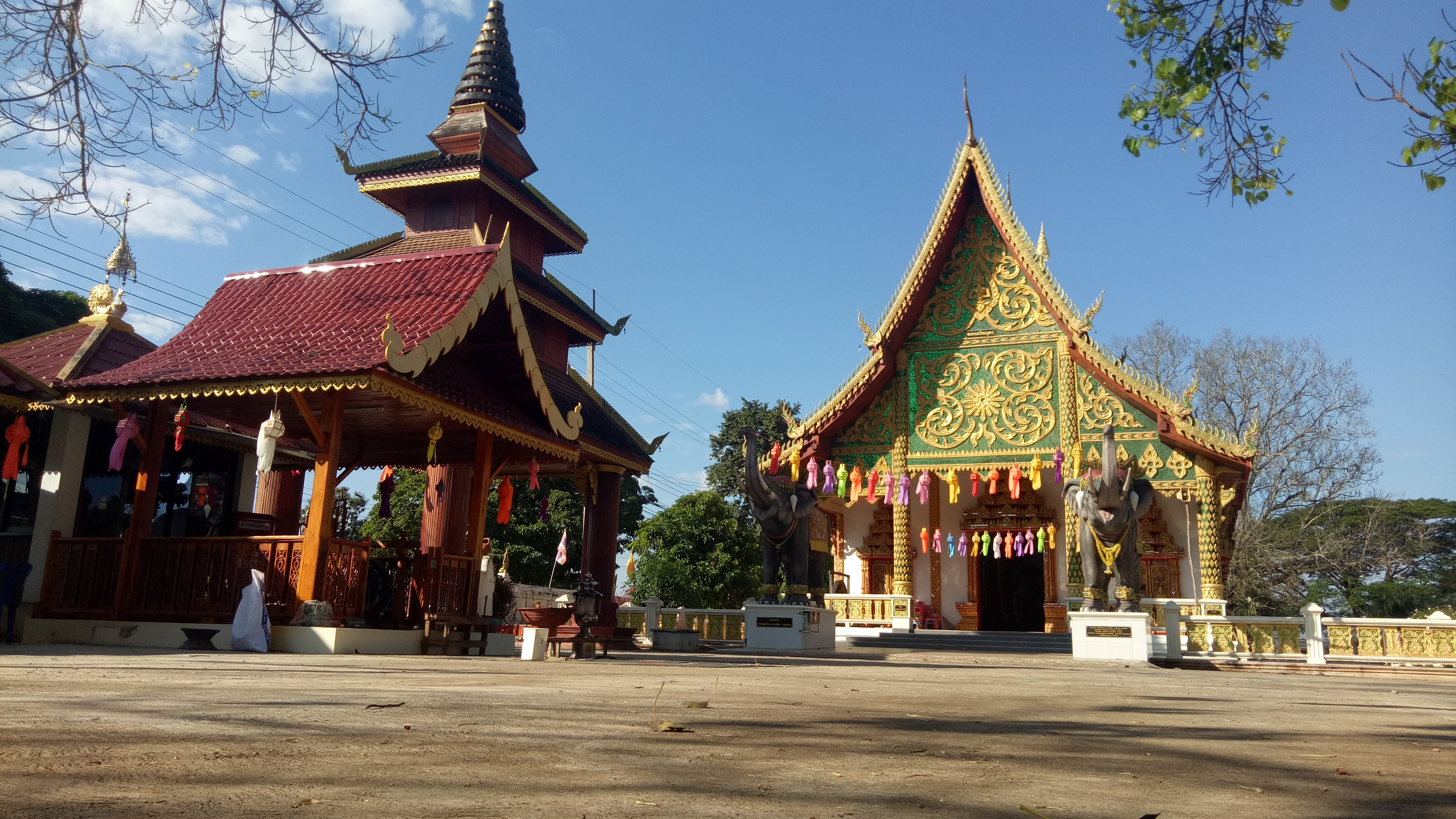
- Wat Thung Kluai a local temple in district

- District location in Phayao province
- Coordinates: 19°35′57″N 100°19′27″E
- Country: Thailand
- Province: Phayao
- Seat: Pa Sak

Area
  - Total: 293.486 km^{2} (113.316 sq mi)

Population (2007)
  - Total: 31,407
  - Density: 107/km^{2} (280/sq mi)
- Time zone: UTC+7 (ICT)
- Postal code: 56110
- Geocode: 5608

Phu Sang (Thai: ภูซาง, pronounced [pʰūː sāːŋ]) is a district (amphoe) of Phayao province in northern Thailand.

== Geography ==
Neighboring districts are (from the south clockwise): Chiang Kham of Phayao Province and Thoeng of Chiang Rai province. To the northeast is Xaignabouli province of Laos.

== History ==
The minor district was established on 26 June 1996. The new district became effective on 15 July and covered five tambons previously belonging to Chiang Kham district.

On 15 May 2007, all 81 minor districts were upgraded to full districts. With publication in the Royal Gazette on 24 August the upgrade became official.

== Administration ==
The district is divided into five sub-districts (tambons), which are further subdivided into 58 villages (mubans). Sop Bong is a sub-district municipality (thesaban tambon) which covers tambon Sop Bong. There are a further four tambon administrative organizations (TAO).

No.	Name	Thai	Villages	Pop.
1.	Phu Sang	ภูซาง	9	6,425
2.	Pa Sak	ป่าสัก	10	4,218
3.	Thung Kluai	ทุ่งกล้วย	12	7,738
4.	Chiang Raeng	เชียงแรง		6,007
5.	Sop Bong	สบบง	12	7,019
