= Phi Pan Nam Range =

Mountain range in Thailand and Laos

- ทิวเขาผีปันน้ำ
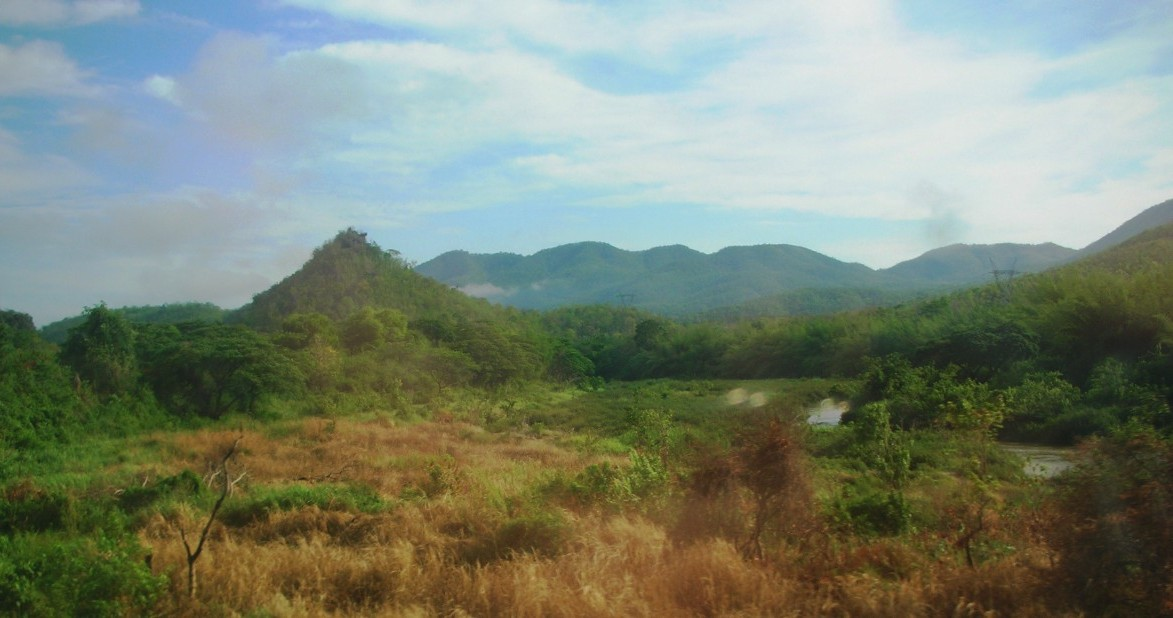
- The Phi Pan Nam Range and the Yom River in Long District, Phrae Province

Highest point
- Peak: Doi Luang
- Elevation: 1,694 m (5,558 ft)
- Coordinates: 19°8′04″N 99°45′29″E

Dimensions
- Length: 400 km (250 mi) NE/SW
- Width: 135 km (84 mi) SE/NW

Geography
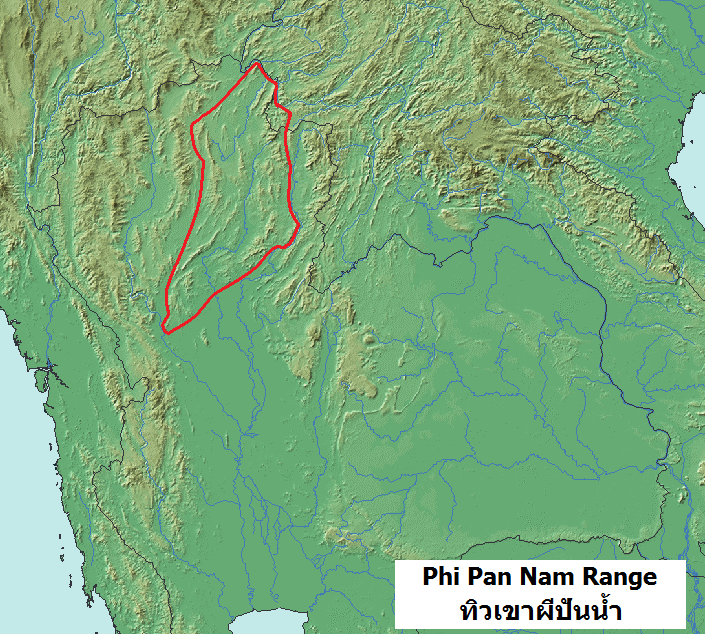
- Countries: Thailand and Laos
- Range coordinates: 18°48′0″N 99°50′30″E
- Parent range: Thai highlands

Geology
- Rock age: Triassic
- Rock type(s): Sandstone and laterite

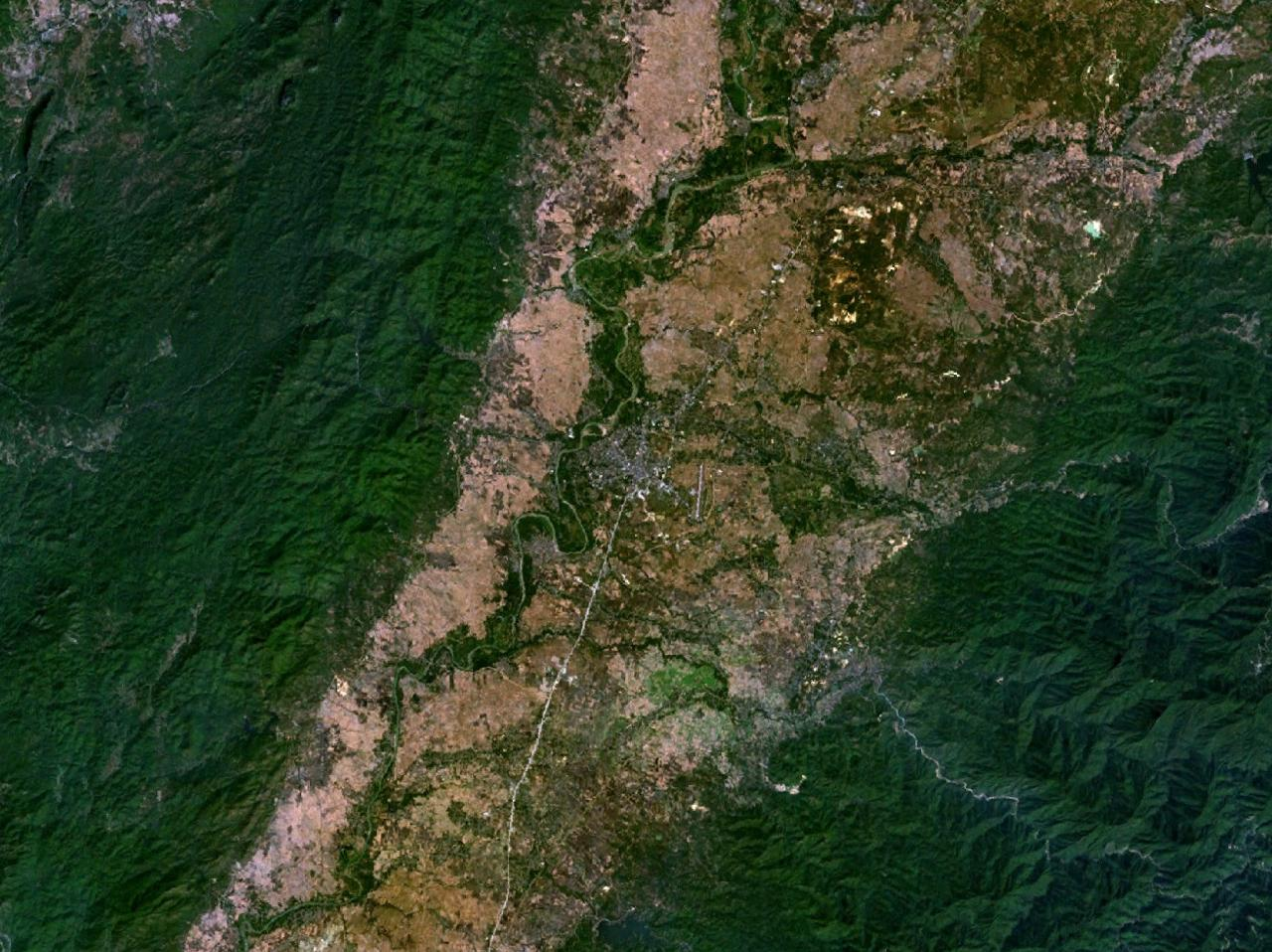
NASA picture of the Phi Pan Nam Mountains in Mueang Phrae District showing the deforestation of lowland areas

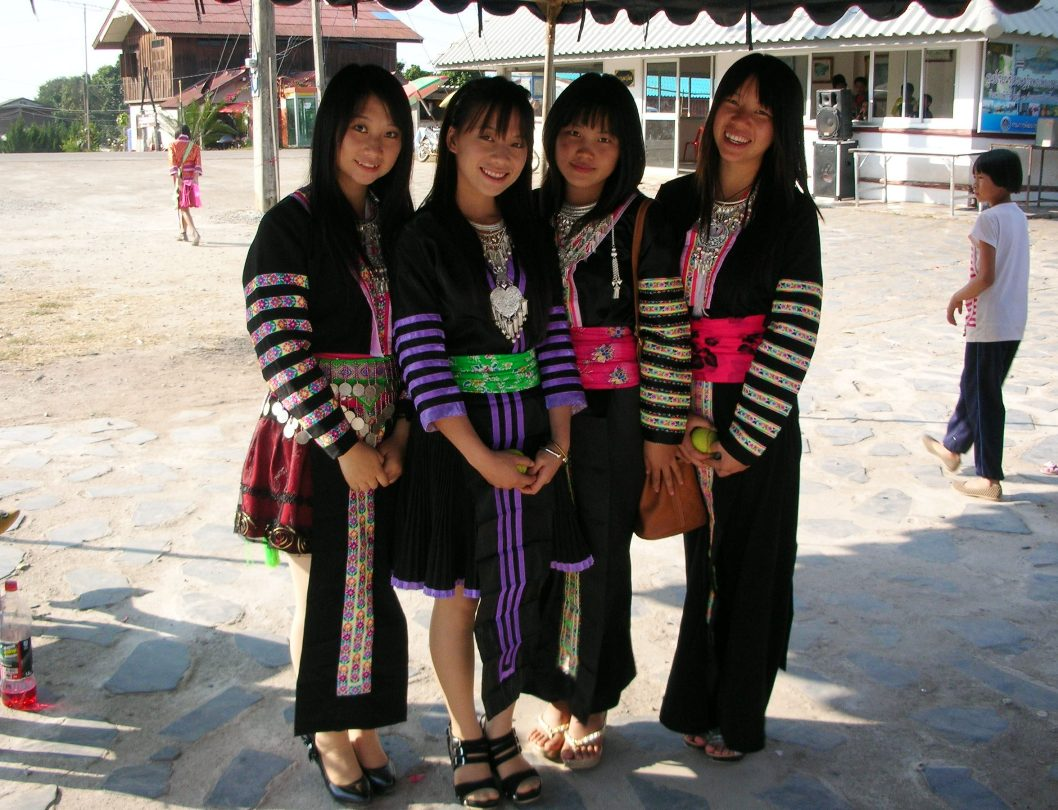
Hmong girls playing a ball game at Ban Phaya Phipak, Thoeng District, Chiang Rai Province

The Phi Pan Nam Range, also Pee Pan Nam, (Thai: ทิวเขาผีปันน้ำ, pronounced [tʰīw kʰǎw pʰǐː pān náːm]) is a 400 km (249 mi) long system of mountain ranges in the eastern half of the Thai highlands. The range lies mostly in Thailand, although a small section in the northeast is within Sainyabuli and Bokeo provinces of Laos.

In Thailand the range extends mainly across Chiang Rai, Phayao, Lampang, Phrae, Nan, Uttaradit and Sukhothai Provinces, reaching Tak Province at its southwestern end. The population density of the area is relatively low. Only two sizable towns, Phayao and Phrae, are within the area of the mountain system and both have fewer than 20,000 inhabitants each. Larger towns, like Chiang Rai and Uttaradit, are near the limits of the Phi Pan Nam Range, in the north and in the south, respectively.

Phahonyothin Road, part of the AH2 Highway system, crosses the Phi Pan Nam Range area from north to south, between Tak and Chiang Rai. There are two railway tunnels of the Northern Line across the Phi Pan Nam mountains. Both are on the south side of the range: the 130.2 m Huai Mae Lan Tunnel in Phrae Province and the 362.4 m Khao Phlueng Tunnel in Uttaradit and Phrae Provinces.

In the mountains north of Thoeng, at the northeast end of the range, Hmong people live in small villages such as Ban Saen Than Sai and Ban Phaya Phripak, the latter on top of a mountain pass.

== Geography ==
The Phi Pan Nam Range is composed of many smaller mountain chains roughly aligned in a north–south direction in its northern part and, further south, in a northeast–southwest direction. These ranges cover an extensive area and are often separated by intermontane basins or lowlands. They end in the west with the Khun Tan Range, in the east with the Luang Prabang Range, and with the Central Plain of Siam in the south. The northern tip is bound by the Mekong River.

There are columnar basalt formations in Mon Hin Kong (Thai: ม่อนหินกอง) in an area in the mountains near Na Phun, Wang Chin District, Phrae Province. In Phae Mueang Phi there are mushroom rocks and other bizarre rock formations caused by erosion.

=== Sub-ranges ===
The Phi Pan Nam range system is often divided into two physiographic longitudinal sections:

- Western Phi Pan Nam Range (เทือกเขาผีปันน้ำตะวันตก) or Phi Pan Nam Range proper, in the northwest between the Wang and Yom Rivers. Some scholarly works designate the Khun Tan Range as the "Western Phi Pan Nam Range" and this section therefore as the "Central Phi Pan Nam Range".
- Eastern Phi Pan Nam Range (เทือกเขาผีปันน้ำตะวันออก), also known as "Phlueng Range" (ทิวเขาพลึง) in the southeast between the Yom and the Nan Rivers.

==== Mountains ====
The highest point is the 1,694 metres (5,558 ft) high summit known as Doi Luang. It is in the northwestern area of the range near Phayao town, but there are a number of lesser mountains with the name 'Doi Luang' throughout the range. Other noteworthy peaks are:

- Doi Phu Langka (1,641 m)
- Doi Chi (1,638 m)
- Doi Pha Mon at Phu Chi Fa (1,628 m)
- Doi Pha Tang (1,608 m)
- Doi Cha Tong (1,603 m)
- Doi Ku (1,557 m)
- Doi Yao (1,543 m )
- Doi Huai Nam Lao (1,544 m)
- Doi Nang (1,507 m)
- Phu Chi Fa (1,442 m)
- Doi Luang, Mae Chai District (1,426 m)
- Doi Phu Kheng (1,403 m)
- Doi Luang, Ban Na Fai (1,396 m)
- Doi Pha Khi Nok (1,365 m)
- Doi Luang Pae Mueang(1,328 m)
- Khun Huai Han (1,303 m)
- Doi Phu Nang (1,202 m)
- Doi Nang (1,195 m)
- Doi Ian (1,178 m)
- Doi Khun Mae Loe (1,075 m)
- Doi Pha Daeng (1,023 m)
- Doi Pha Mon(1,013 m)
- Doi San Klang (938 m)
- Doi Ngaem (867 m)
- Doi Pui (843 m)
- Doi Kham, Thoeng District (823 m)
- Doi San Pan Nam (773 m)
- Mon Yao (751 m)
- Doi Yang Kham (727 m)
- Doi Pae Luang (651 m)
- Doi Huai Ha (590 m)
- Doi Lan (559 m)

=== Hydrography ===
The Phi Pan Nam range of mountains is not as high as neighboring mountain systems. It is, however, significant from the hydrographic point of view. These mountains divide the Mekong from the Chao Phraya watershed and important rivers of Thailand have their source in the Phi Pan Nam area. Its name in Thai "ทิวเขาผีปันน้ำ" roughly means "the mountains of the spirits dividing the waters", 'spirits' (ผี phi) here referring to ancient mountain deities of Thai folklore.

Among the Thai rivers that originate in the Phi Pan Nam Mountains the main ones are the Wang and Yom River, with their tributaries such as the Ngao, flowing towards the Chao Phraya. The Ing and the Lao, a tributary of the Kok River, flow northwards and are part of the Mekong basin. A great number of smaller rivers have their sources in mountains across the range.

The Sirikit Dam is at the southeastern edge of the Phi Pan Nam mountains.

== History ==
There were formerly large teak forests in some areas of the range. However, at the beginning of the 20th century concessions were given to logging companies and the forest cover dwindled dramatically especially in lowland areas between ranges. Deforestation also has affected areas that were cleared for local agriculture. Often wildfires are deliberately set off by local farmers, as well as by speculators who hire people to set forests on fire in order to claim land title deeds for the areas that have become "degraded forest".

Owing to the relative isolation of the area there was Communist insurgency in the mountainous forests of the Phi Pan Nam Range during the Cold War. A memorial was erected on 1,118 m high Doi Phaya Phipak (ดอยพญาพิภักดิ์) to commemorate the victims of the battles between troops of the Royal Thai Armed Forces and the insurgents of the Communist Party of Thailand between the 1950s and the 1970s. There is now a historical site and a forest park at Doi Phaya Phipak, also known as Phaya Phipak.

A controversial dam was planned in the central area of the range on the Yom River in Kaeng Suea Ten in 1991 but this project was later abandoned in the face of popular opposition. The debate about the dam, however, resumed in 2011. Two smaller dams on the Yom River may be built instead of the Kaeng Suea Ten mega-dam.

== Ecology ==
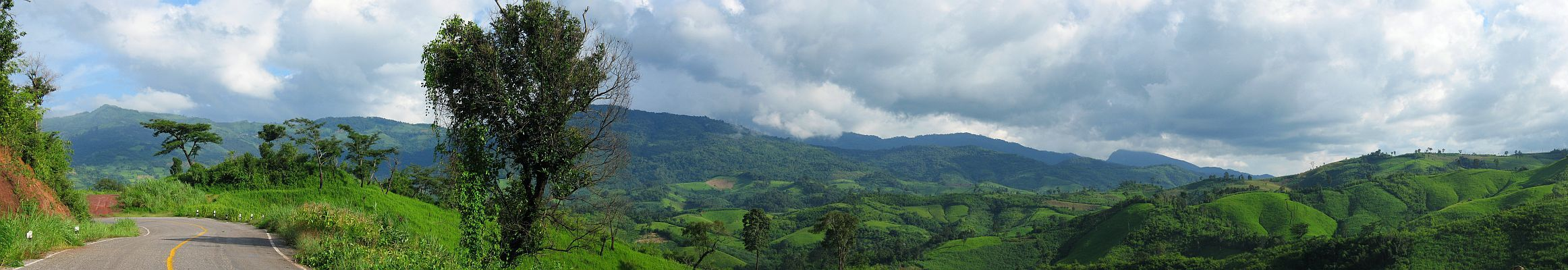
The Phu Chi Fa group

Generally the forested areas of the Phi Pan Nam are known for their teak and bamboo forest. The mountain ranges are covered with tropical dry broadleaf forests, including sections of moist evergreen forest, mixed deciduous forest, dry deciduous forest, as well as hill evergreen forest at higher altitudes. There is great biodiversity in these mountains and their few unspoilt valleys, with a wide range of animal and plant species. The whole area of the range is part of the Central Indochina dry forests ecoregion.

There are a number of protected areas in the Phi Pan Nam mountains, mostly encompassing mountainous terrain. These are patchily distributed across the range, and the largest national parks are in its central part, roughly around Phayao town. Protected sectors are typically surrounded by agricultural zones, often near roads and villages and thus with vast surfaces under the influence of the edge effect.

Besides the national parks and wildlife reserves, there are the Huai Tak Teak Biosphere Reserve in Lampang Province and the Phu Langka Forest Park, located in Chiang Kham District and Pong District of Phrae Province. The main attractions of the forest park are Doi Hua Ling, Doi Phu Lang Ka and Doi Phu Nom; the latter is a breast-shaped hill rising in an area of grassland.

=== Flora ===
Formerly there were large extensions of teak (Tectona grandis) forests in the range, including the highly appreciated golden teak variety. These forests are now much reduced. Forest fires are common during the dry season.

Some of the other species of trees found in the forests of the mountains are: Afzelia xylocarpa, Ailanthus triphysa, Anisoptera costata, Artocarpus lacucha, Berrya ammonilla, Betula alnoides, Cinnamomum iners, Dalbergia oliveri, Dillenia pentagyna, Dipterocarpus obtusifolius, Dipterocarpus alatus, Dipterocarpus turbinatus, Duabanga grandiflora, Garcinia indica, Hopea odorata, Irvingia malayana, Lagerstroemia loudonii, Lagerstroemia calyculata, Lagerstroemia tomentosa, Lithocarpus densiflorus, Mangifera caloneura, Michelia champaca, Michelia floribunda, Pterocarpus macrocarpus, Schleichera oleosa, Terminalia bellirica, Toona ciliata, Vitex pinnata and Xylia xylocarpa.

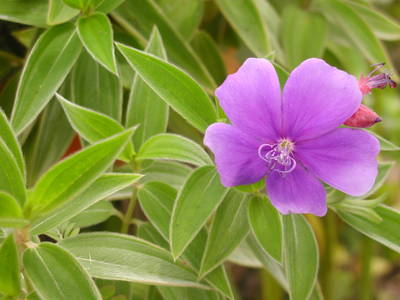
Melastoma malabathricum, Thai: โคลงเคลงขี้นก Khlong Khe Long Khi Nok, a flower seasonally carpeting wide areas of grassland on the higher slopes of the range.

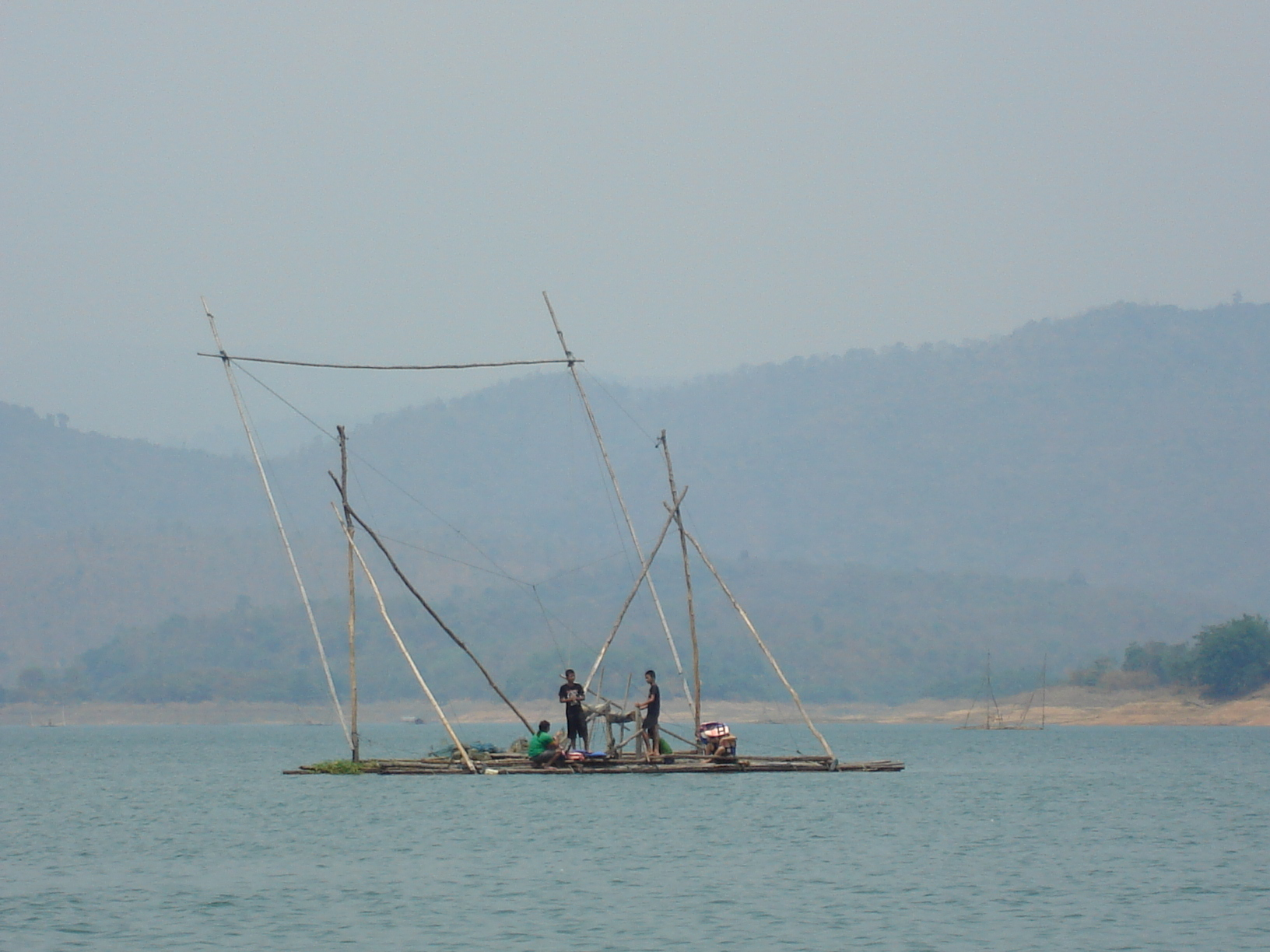
The Phi Pan Nam mountains near the Sirikit Dam. The haze caused by wildfires is prevalent during the dry season

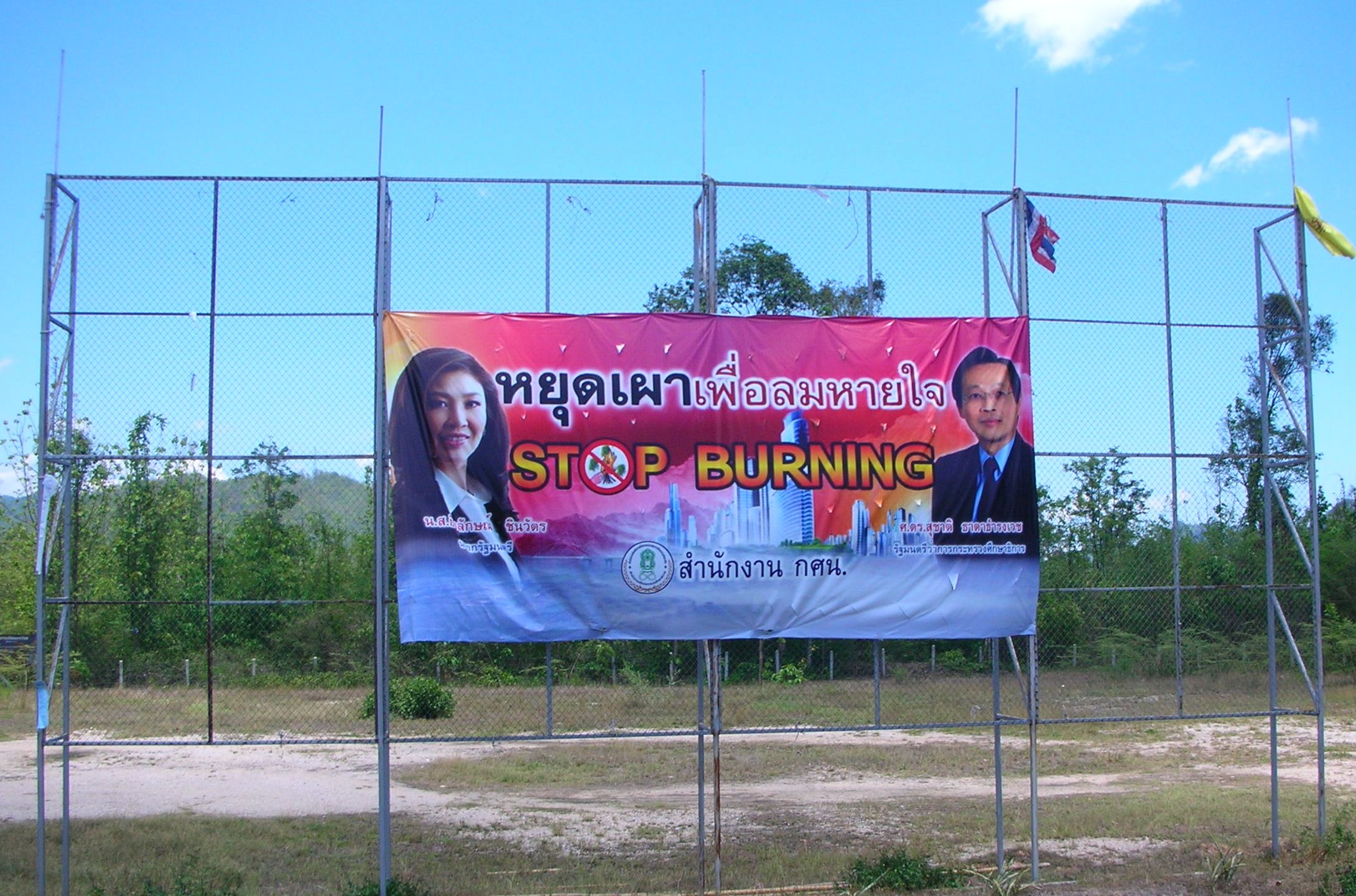
Sign put up by the Thai government by Route 1 near Tham Pha Thai National Park warning against deliberately setting off forest fires in the mountains

=== Fauna ===
The endangered animal species sheltered by some of the fragmented, although relatively undisturbed Phi Pan Nam forests are the fishing cat, sun bear, Asiatic black bear, Chinese pangolin, Indochinese tiger, sambar deer, gaur, Bengal slow loris, Sunda pangolin, as well as the Asiatic softshell turtle and the big-headed turtle.

There are also Asian elephants in their natural habitat in a few protected areas, such as in the Si Satchanalai National Park. Formerly there were also in the Wiang Ko Sai National Park but there have been no sightings in recent years. The green peafowl, now rare in the wilderness and threatened by habitat destruction throughout Southeast Asia, breeds in the central mountains of the range from January to March.

Among the other animals, the Indian muntjac, Burmese hare, Indian hare, Indochinese flying squirrel, black giant squirrel, Java mouse-deer, jungle cat, mainland serow, masked palm civet, Asian palm civet, Malayan civet, bamboo rat and northern treeshrew, as well as the Bengal monitor deserve mention.

A variety of birds are found in the range such as the blue-winged siva, white-rumped shama, scaly-breasted munia, black bulbul, blue-throated barbet, pin-striped tit-babbler, blue-bearded bee-eater, crested kingfisher, sooty-headed bulbul, coppersmith barbet, great hornbill, chestnut-headed bee-eater and the red-billed blue magpie.

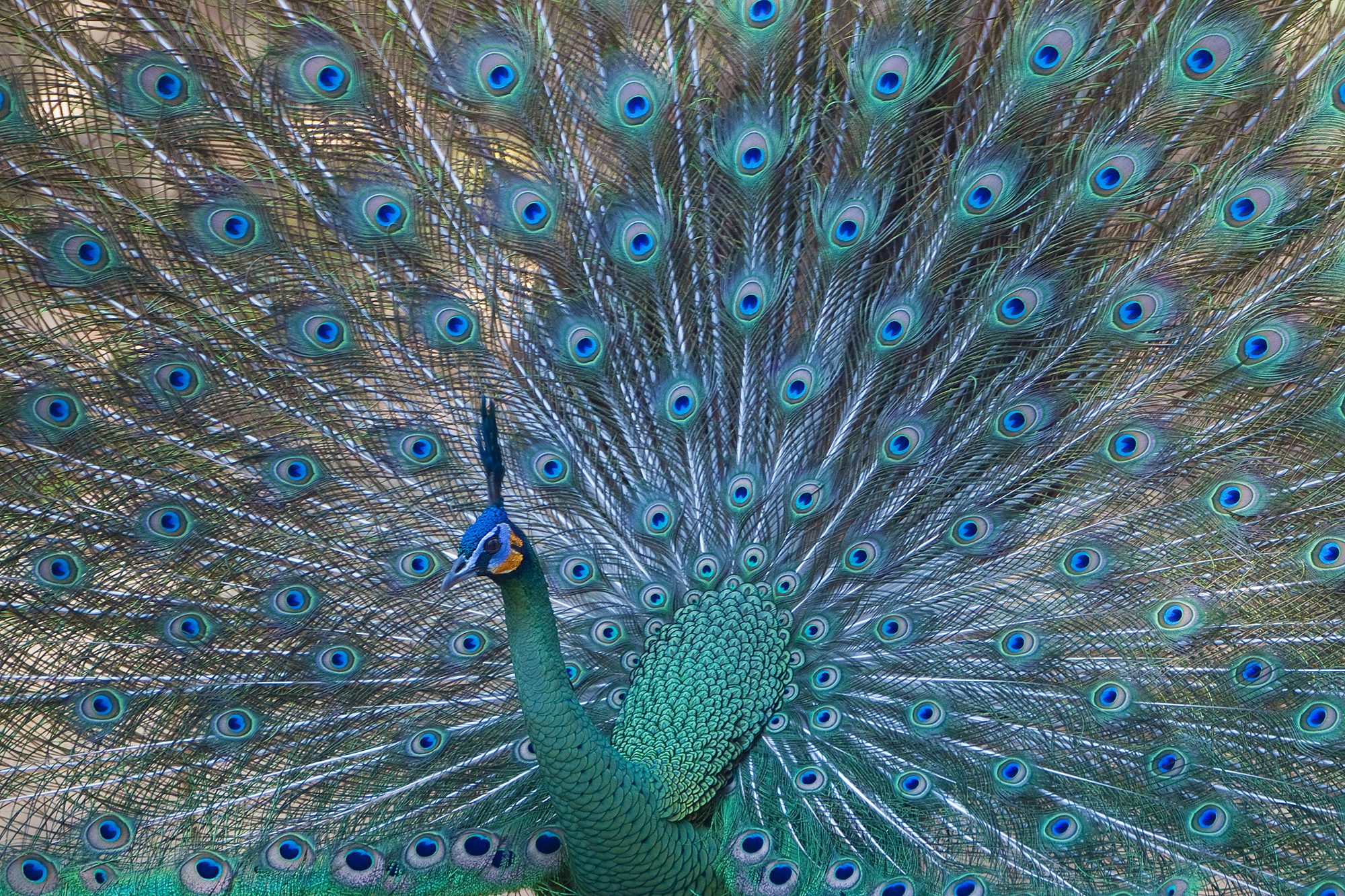
The endangered green peafowl. Its preferred habitat is dry deciduous forest close to water and away from human disturbance.

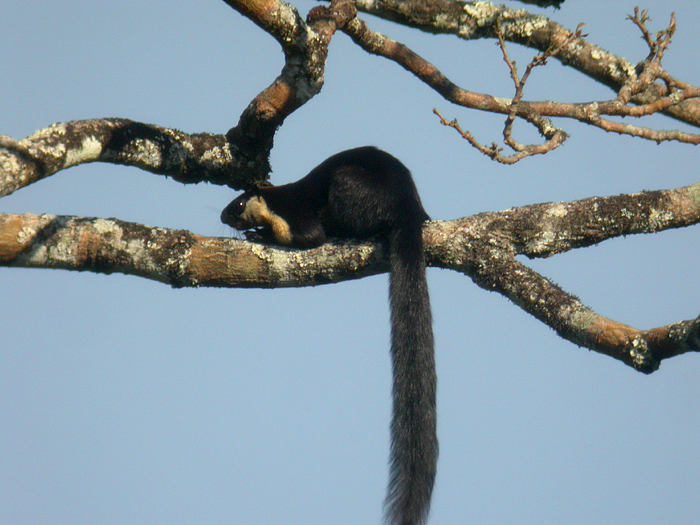
The Black giant squirrel (Ratufa bicolor), Thai: พญากระรอกดำ.

=== Protected areas ===
- Doi Chong National Park
- Doi Luang National Park
- Doi Pha Khlong National Park
- Doi Phu Nang National Park
- Khun Sathan National Park
- Lam Nam Kok National Park
- Lam Nam Nan National Park
- Mae Phuem National Park
- Mae Yom National Park
- Nanthaburi National Park
- Phu Sang National Park
- Si Nan National Park
- Si Satchanalai National Park
- Tham Pha Thai National Park
- Tham Sakoen National Park
- Wiang Ko Sai National Park
- Doi Pha Chang Wildlife Sanctuary
- Lam Nam Nan Phang Kha Wildlife Sanctuary
- Nam Pat Wildlife Sanctuary
- Wiang Lo Wildlife Sanctuary

== Ranges and features of the system ==
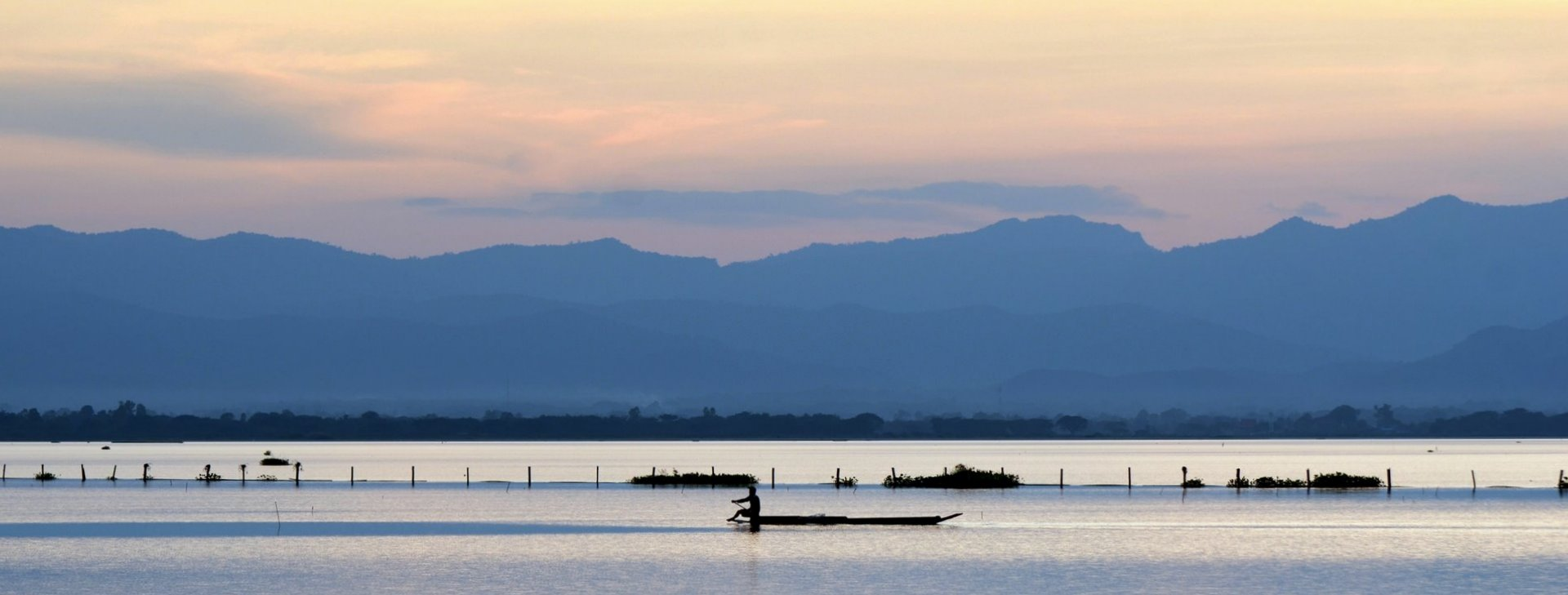
The Phi Pan Nam Range rising behind Phayao Lake

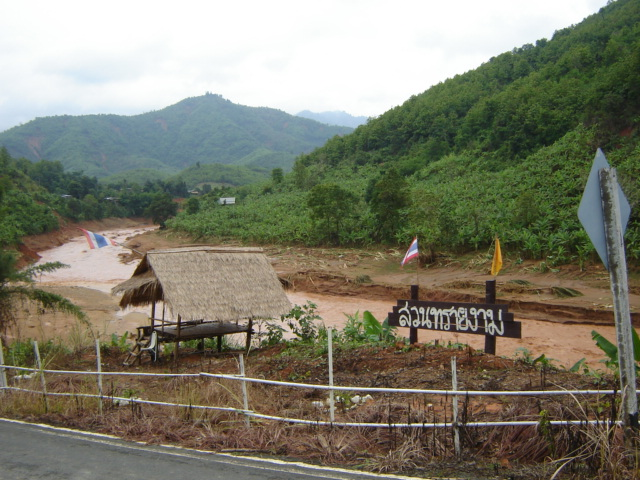
The range at its southern end in Laplae District

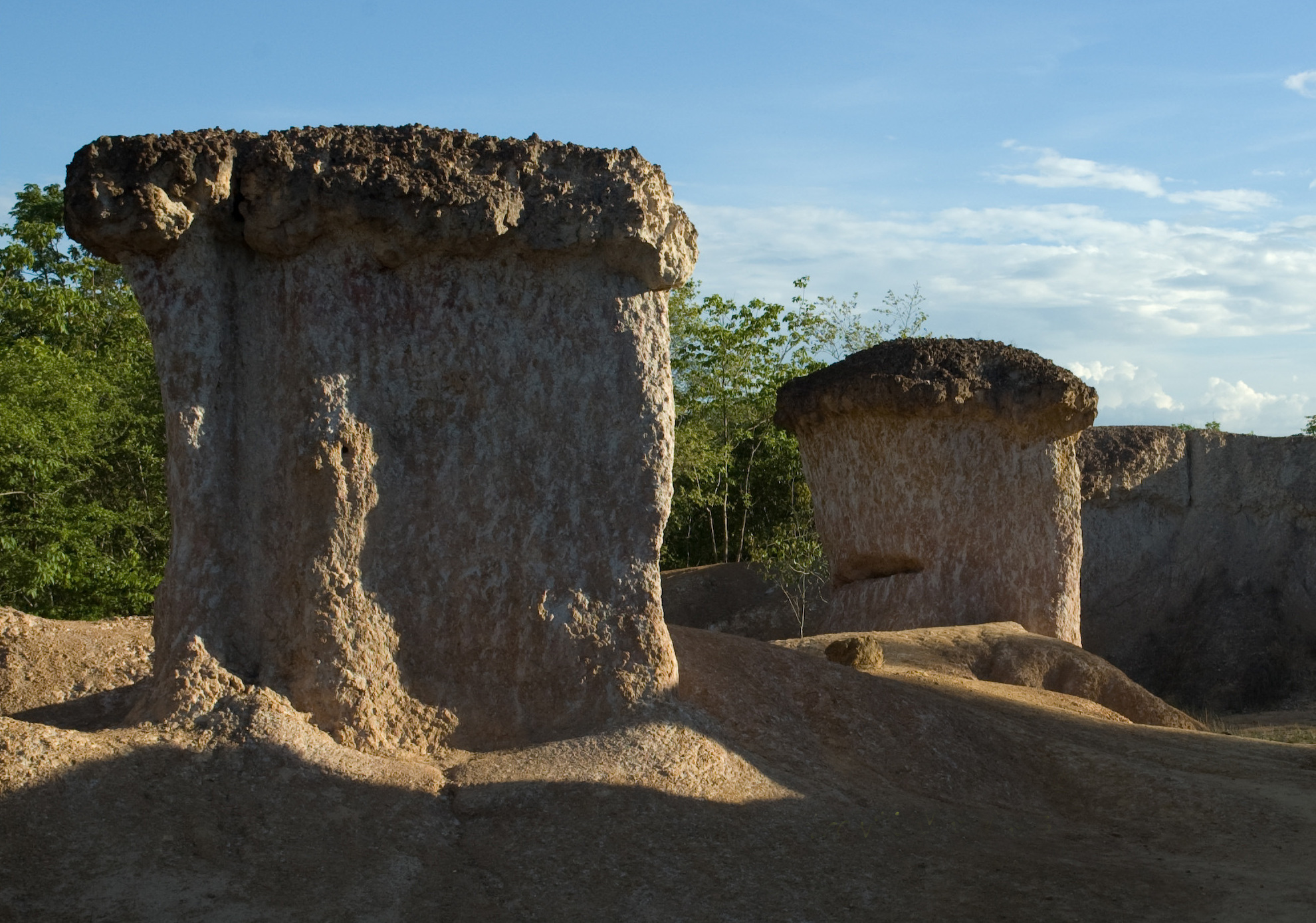
Phae Mueang Phi ("Ghost Canyon") near Phrae

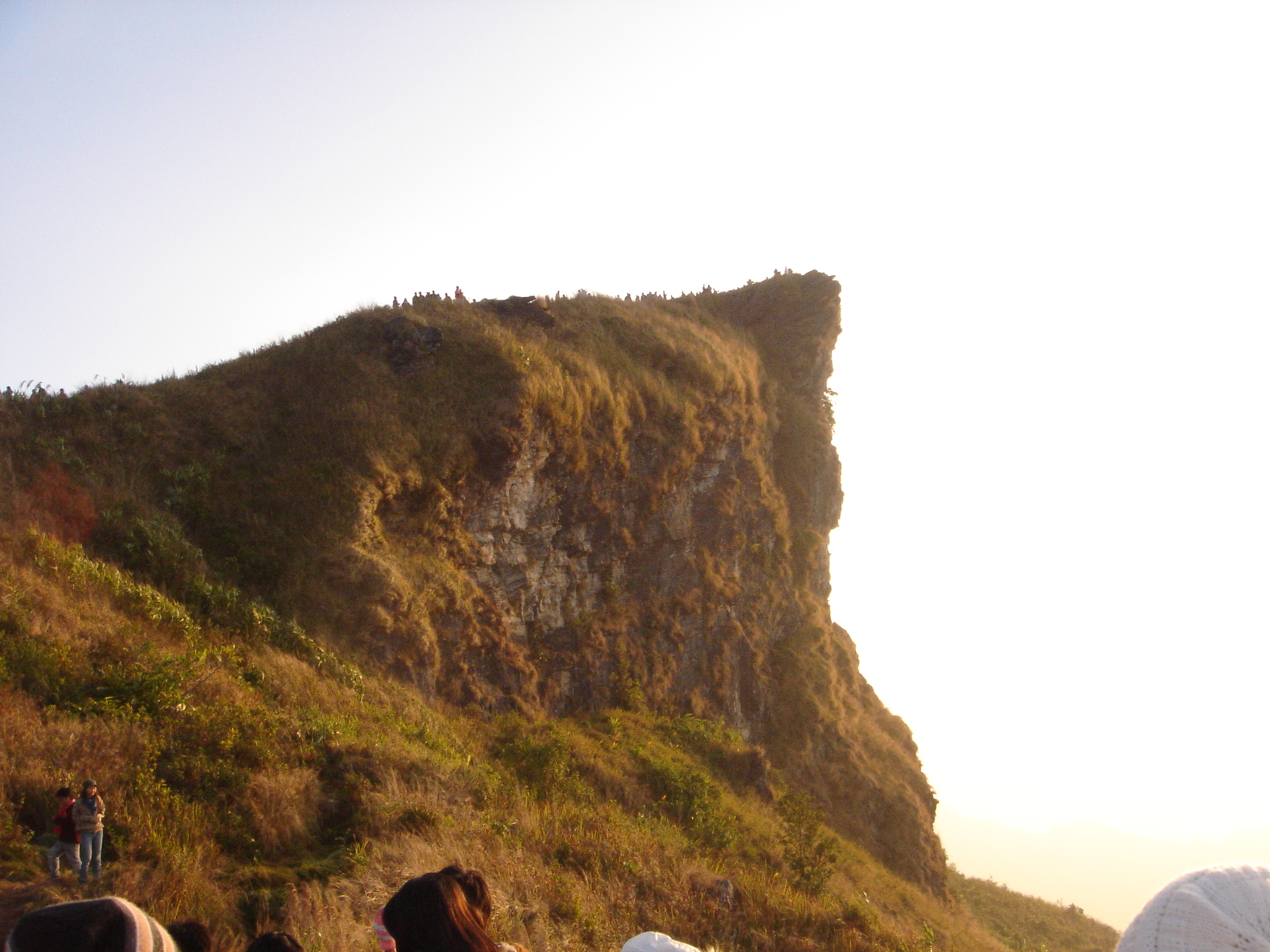
Cliff in the Phu Chi Fa area, Chiang Rai Province, at the northern end of the range near the Lao border

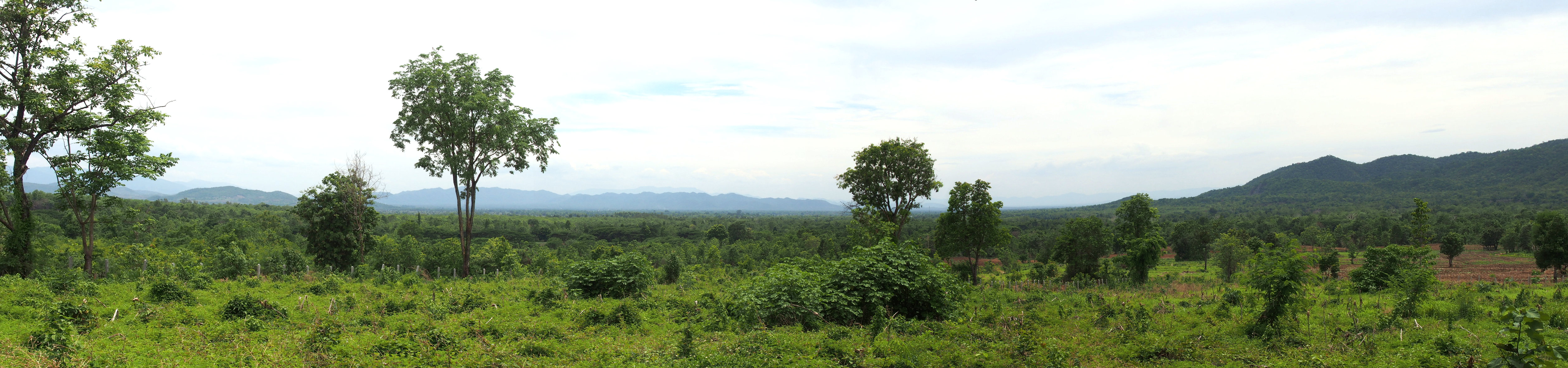
Mae Tha District, Lampang, in the western fringes of the range

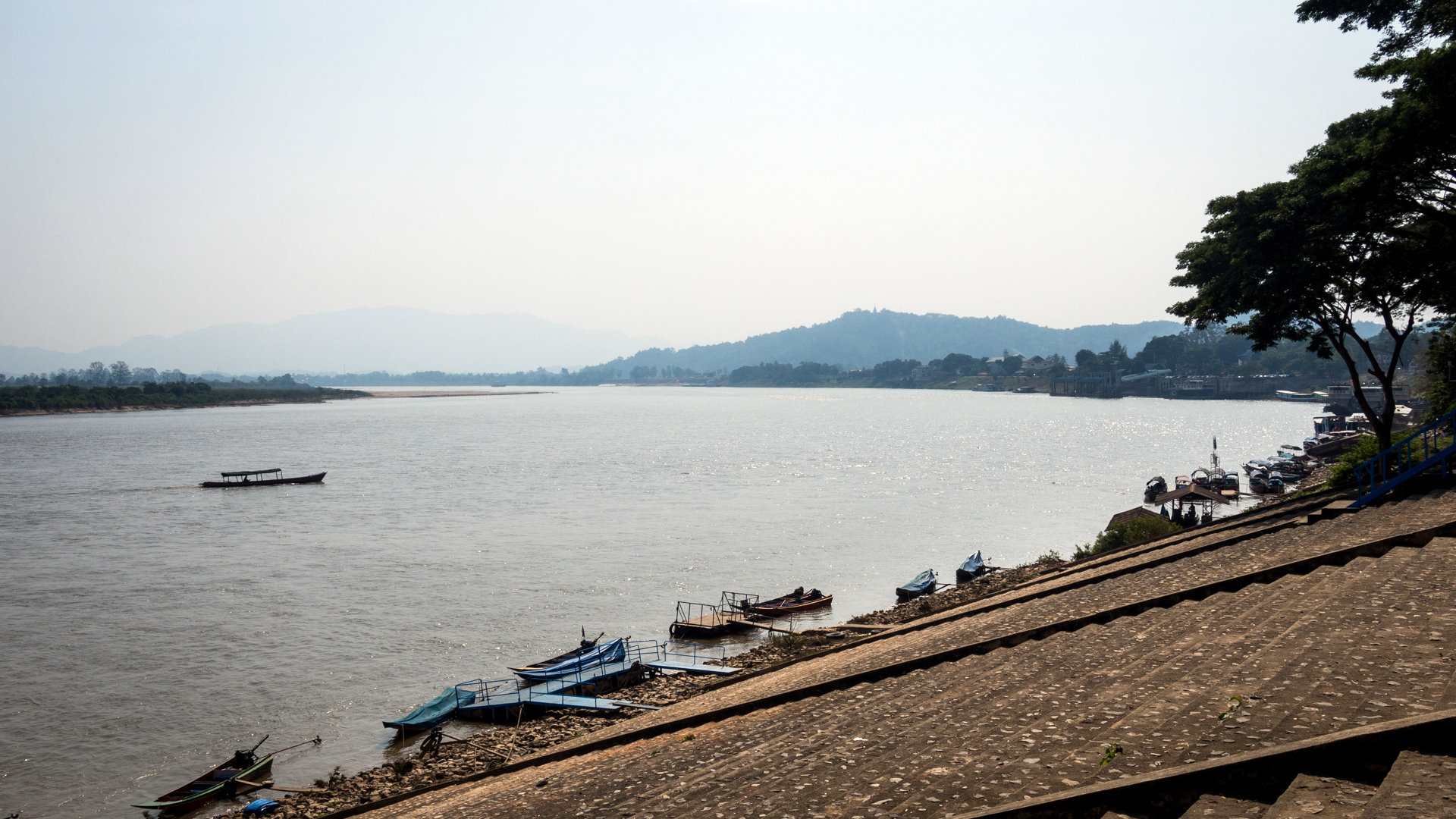
The northeastern tip of the range, in Chiang Saen District and Chiang Khong District, is bound by the Mekong river

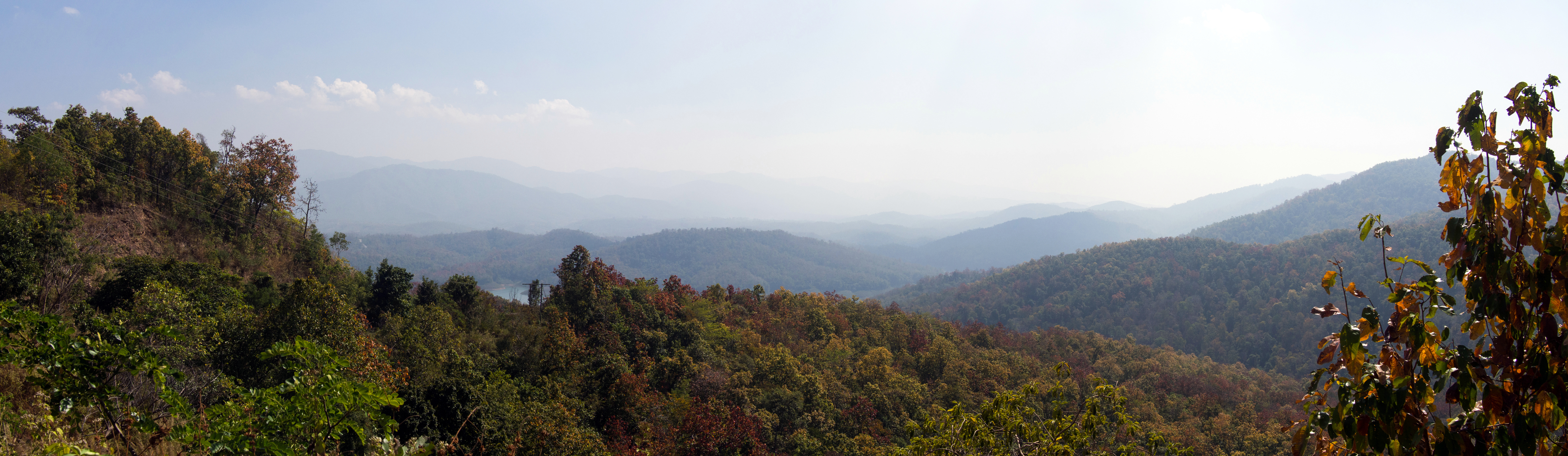
"Autumn" colors during the cool, dry season in Na Muen District, Nan Province

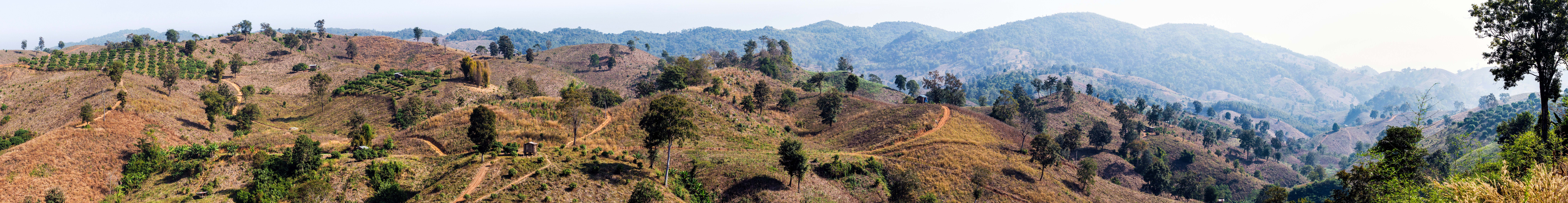
The eastern flank of the range, in Nan Province

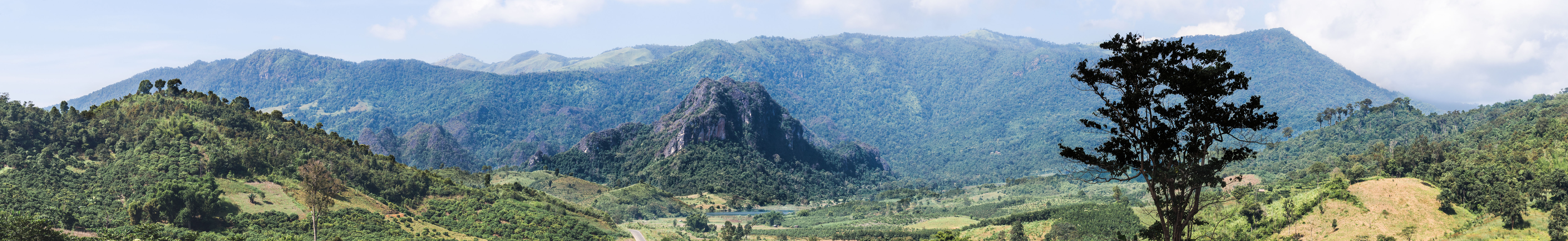
Karst formations from Rte 1148, Song Khwae District, Nan Province

== See also ==
- Deforestation in Thailand
- Thai highlands
- Si Satchanalai historical park
