= Ngao, Thailand =

Ngao, Thailand may refer to:

- Ngao District, Lampang Province, Thailand
- Ngao, Thoeng, a village and subdistrict of Thoeng District, Chiang Rai Province, Thailand
- Ngao River, a river in Northern Thailand, tributary of the Yom River
- Ngao River (Yuam), a river in Northern Thailand, tributary of the Yuam River
