= Doi Lan subdistrict =

Coordinates: 19°40′N 99°55′E

Doi Lan ดอยลาน
- Subdistrict
- Interactive map of Doi Lan
- Country: Thailand
- Province: Chiang Rai
- District: Mueang Chiang Rai

Population (2005)
  - Total: 10,854
- Time zone: UTC+7 (ICT)

Doi Lan (Thai: ดอยลาน) is a tambon (subdistrict) of Mueang Chiang Rai District, in Chiang Rai Province, Thailand. In 2005, it had a population of 10,854 people. The tambon contains 20 villages.

This subdistrict is named after nearby Doi Lan, a 559 m high karstic outcrop rising in one of the intermontane basins of the Phi Pan Nam Range.
