= San Sai Ngam =

San Sai Ngam สันทรายงาม
- Tambon
- Country: Thailand
- Province: Chiang Rai
- District: Thoeng

Population (2005)
  - Total: 4,308
- Time zone: UTC+7 (ICT)

San Sai Ngam (Thai: สันทรายงาม) is a village and tambon (subdistrict) of Thoeng District, in Chiang Rai Province, Thailand. In 2005 it had a population of 4,308 people. The tambon contains seven villages.
