= Doi Luang (Phi Pan Nam Range) =

Mountain in Thailand

- ดอยหลวง
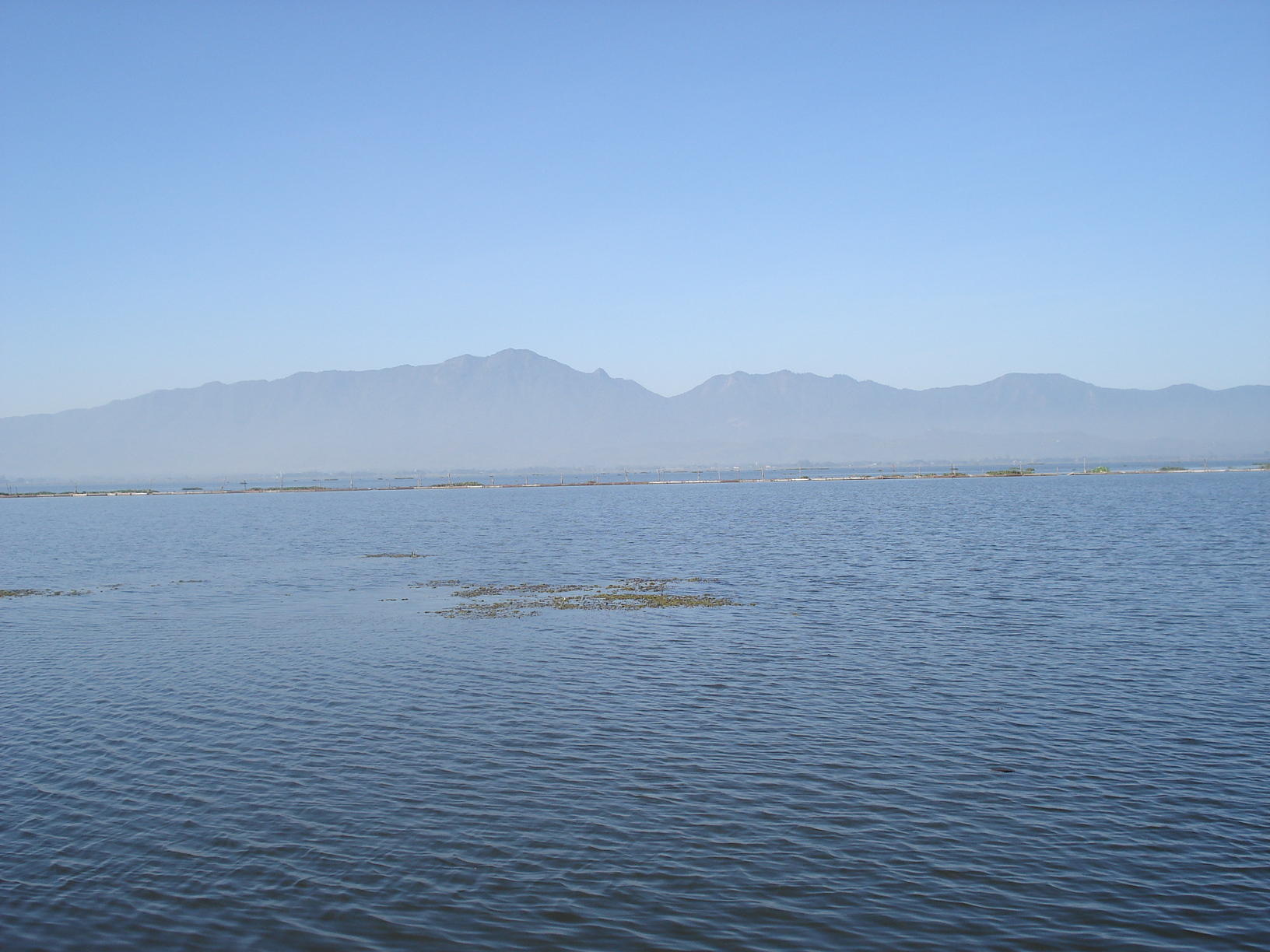
- Doi Luang rising west of Phayao Lake

Highest point
- Elevation: 1,694 m (5,558 ft)
- Prominence: 1,117 m (3,665 ft)
- Listing: Ribu; List of mountains in Thailand
- Coordinates: 19°08′04″N 99°45′29″E

Geography
- Location within Thailand
- Location: Thailand, Phayao Province
- Parent range: Phi Pan Nam Range

Climbing
- First ascent: unknown
- Easiest route: drive, then hike

Doi Luang (Thai: ดอยหลวง) is a 1,694 m high mountain in Thailand, part of the Phi Pan Nam Range.

The mountain rises at the western end of Ban Tun Subdistrict, Mueang Phayao District, Phayao Province, near the point where the limit of this province meets with Lampang Province. With a height of 1,694 metres it is the highest point of the Phi Pan Nam Range. There are a number of lesser mountains with the name "Doi Luang" throughout the same range.

Its summit is in Doi Luang National Park, less than seven km to the north of Route 120 between Wang Nuea and the AH2 Highway.

== See also ==
- Doi Luang National Park
- Thai highlands
- List of mountains in Thailand
