= Wiang, Thoeng =

Wiang เวียง
- Tambon
- Country: Thailand
- Province: Chiang Rai
- District: Thoeng

Population (2015)
  - Total: 16,765
- Time zone: UTC+7 (ICT)
- Postal code: 57160
- TIS 1099: 570401

Wiang, Thoeng (Thai: เวียง) is a tambon (subdistrict) of Thoeng District, in Chiang Rai Province, Thailand. In 2015 it had a population of 16,765 people.

== Administration ==
=== Central administration ===
The tambon is divided into 25 administrative villages (mubans).

| No. | Name | Thai |
|---|---|---|
| 1. | Ban Wiang Thoeng | บ้านเวียงเทิง |
| 2. | Ban Tang Khao | บ้านตั้งข้าว |
| 3. | Ban Huai Khrai | บ้านห้วยไคร้ |
| 4. | Ban Rong Chae | บ้านร่องแช่ |
| 5. | Ban Thung Hong | บ้านทุ่งโห้ง |
| 6. | Ban Huai Khrai Mai | บ้านห้วยไคร้ใหม่ |
| 7. | Ban Thung Khai Khai | บ้านทุ่งขัยไฃย |
| 8. | Ban Huai Khrai | บ้านห้วยไคร้ |
| 9. | Ban Rong Kham Pom | บ้านร่องขามป้อม |
| 10. | Ban Mai | บ้านใหม่ |
| 11. | Ban Huai Phueng | บ้านห้วยผึ้ง |
| 12. | Ban Rong Rio | บ้านร่องริว |
| 13. | Ban Huai Luang | บ้านห้วยหลวง |
| 14. | Ban Phra Koet | บ้านพระเกิด |
| 15. | Ban Wiang Tai | บ้านเวียงใต้ |
| 16. | Ban Muang Phrai Wan | บ้านม่วงไพรวัลย์ |
| 17. | Ban Huai Khrai Santi Suk | บ้านห้วยไคร้ส้นติสุข |
| 18. | Ban Rim Ing | บ้านริมอิง |
| 19. | Ban Thung Chaloem Phra Kiat | บ้านทุ่งเฉลิมพระเกียรติ |
| 20. | Ban Wiang Chom Cho | บ้านเวียงจอมจ้อ |
| 21. | Ban Huai Khrai Nuea | บ้านห้วยไคร้เหนือ |
| 22. | Ban Thung Hong Nuea | บ้านทุ่งโห้งเหนือ |
| 23. | Ban Huai Ramet | บ้านห้วยระเมศ |
| 24. | Ban Huai Khrai Tai | บ้านห้วยไคร้ใต้ |
| 25. | Ban Huai Khrai Lan Thong | บ้านห้วยไคร้ลานทอง |

=== Local administration ===
The area of the subdistrict is shared by two local governments:

- Subdistrict municipality (Thesaban Tambon) Wiang Thoeng (เทศบาลตำบลเวียงเทิง)
- subdistrict administrative organization (SAO) Wiang (องค์การบริหารส่วนตำบลเวียง)
