= Pa Sak, Phayao =

Pa Sak ป่าสัก
- Tambon
- Interactive map of Pa Sak
- Coordinates: 19°36′51″N 100°20′24″E
- Country: Thailand
- Province: Phayao
- Amphoe: Phu Sang

Population (2019)
  - Total: 4,211
- Time zone: UTC+7 (TST)
- Postal code: 56110
- TIS 1099: 560802

Pa Sak (Thai: ป่าสัก) is a tambon (subdistrict) of Phu Sang District, in Phayao Province, Thailand. In 2019 it had a total population of 4,211 people.

== History ==
The subdistrict was created effective August 1, 1995 by splitting off 7 administrative villages from Phu Sang.

== Administration ==
=== Central administration ===
The tambon is subdivided into 10 administrative villages (muban).

No.	Name	Thai
1.	Ban Kae	บ้านแก
2.	Ban Kae	บ้านแก
3.	Ban Ton Phueng	บ้านต้นผึ้ง
4.	Ban Pa Sak	บ้านป่าสัก
5.	Ban Muang Chum	บ้านม่วงชุม
6.	Ban Kae Mai	บ้านแกใหม่
7.	Ban Pa Sak 2	บ้านป่าสัก 2
8.	Ban Muang Mai Sombun	บ้านม่วงใหม่สมบูรณ์
9.	Ban Khuang Kaeo	บ้านข่วงแก้ว
10.	Ban Wiang Kae	บ้านเวียงแก

=== Local administration ===
The whole area of the subdistrict is covered by the subdistrict administrative organization (SAO) Pa Sak (องค์การบริหารส่วนตำบลป่าสัก).
