= Plong =

Plong ปล้อง
- Tambon
- Country: Thailand
- Province: Chiang Rai
- District: Thoeng

Population (2005)
  - Total: 6,812
- Time zone: UTC+7 (ICT)

Plong (Thai: ปล้อง) is a village and tambon (subdistrict) of Thoeng District, in Chiang Rai Province, Thailand. In 2005 it had a population of 6,812 people. The tambon contains 12 villages.
