= Mae Loi =

Mae Loi แม่ลอย
- Tambon
- Interactive map of Mae Loi
- Country: Thailand
- Province: Chiang Rai
- District: Thoeng

Population (2017)
  - Total: 6,669
- Time zone: UTC+7 (ICT)
- Postal code: 57230
- TIS 1099: 570404

Mae Loi (Thai: แม่ลอย) is a tambon (subdistrict) of Thoeng District, in Chiang Rai Province, Thailand. In 2017 it had a population of 6,669 people.

== Administration ==
=== Central administration ===
The tambon is divided into 13 administrative villages (mubans).

No.	Name	Thai
1.	Ban Nong Khuang	บ้านหนองข่วง
2.	Ban Kiang Toi	บ้านเกี๋ยงดอย
3.	Ban Kiang Lum	บ้านเกี๋ยงลุ่ม
4.	Ban Huai Nan	บ้านห้วยน่าน
5.	Ban Mae Loi Rai	บ้านแม่ลอยไร่
6.	Ban Mae Loi Rai Tai	บ้านแม่ลอยไร่ใต้
7.	Ban Kiang Klang	บ้านเกี๋ยงกลาง
8.	Ban San Charoen	บ้านสันเจริญ
9.	Ban Cham Khrai	บ้านจำไคร้
10.	Ban Kiang Doi Sung Noen	บ้านเกี๋ยงดอยสูงเนิน
11.	Ban Mai Suk San	บ้านใหม่สุขสันต์
12.	Ban Si Mongkhon	บ้านศรีมงคล
13.	Ban Kiang Doi Charoen Rat	บ้านเกี๋ยงดอยเจริญราษฎร์

=== Local administration ===
The area of the subdistrict is covered by the subdistrict administrative organization (SAO) Mae Loi (องค์การบริหารส่วนตำบลแม่ลอย).
