= Fai Kwang =

Subdistrict in Phayao Province

Fai Kwang ตำบลฝายกวาง
- Subdistrict
- Motto: ฝายกวางเป็นเมืองพัฒนา โดยยึดหลักปรัชญาของเศรษฐกิจพอเพียง
- Country: Thailand
- Province: Phayao
- District: Chiang Kham

Government
  - Type: Subdistrict Administrative Organization (SAO)
  - Head of SAO: Jakkarit Prakasit

Population (2026)
  - Total: 6,466
- Time zone: UTC+7 (ICT)

Fai Kwang (Thai: ตำบลฝายกวาง, pronounced [fˈa͡ɪ kwˈaŋ]) is a tambon (subdistrict) of Chiang Kham District, in Phayao province, Thailand. In 2026, it had a population of 6,466 people.

== History ==
Fai Kwang became a tambon on January 19, 1996, and had a thesaban on July 7, 2008.

== Administration ==
=== Central administration ===
The tambon is divided into seventeeen administrative villages (mubans).

No.	Name	Thai	Population
1.	Fai Kwang	ฝายกวาง	370
2.	Pua	ปัว	321
3.	Sriprom	ศรีพรม	213
4.	Nong	หนอง	409
5.	Pua Mai	ปัวใหม่	494
6.	Thung Lom	ทุ่งหล่ม	446
7.	Sa-lap	สลาบ	488
8.	Waen Khong	แวนโค้ง	321
9.	Maicharoen Prai	ใหม่เจริญไพร	546
10.	Thung Lom Mai	ทุ่งหล่มใหม่	345
11.	Santisuk	สันติสุข	331
12.	Buanak Pattana	บัวนาคพัฒนา	456
13.	Mainasa	ใหม่นาสา	296
14.	Sivilai	ศิวิไล	428
15.	Nong Lue	หนองลื้อ	426
16.	Than Pattana	ฐานพัฒนา	198
17.	Fai Kwang	ฝายกวาง	378
