= Nong Raet =

Coordinates: 19.617995°N 100.116420°E

- Tambon
- Interactive map of Nong Raet
- Country: Thailand
- Province: Chiang Rai
- District: Thoeng

Population (2005)
  - Total: 4,237
- Time zone: UTC+7 (ICT)

Nong Raet (Thai: ?) is a village and tambon (subdistrict) of Thoeng District, in Chiang Rai Province, Thailand. In 2005 it had a population of 4,237 people. The tambon contains seven villages.
