= Ngio =

Coordinates: 19.6989°N 100.1030°E

Ngio งิ้ว
- Tambon
- Interactive map of Ngio
- Country: Thailand
- Province: Chiang Rai
- District: Thoeng

Population (2005)
  - Total: 12,589
- Time zone: UTC+7 (ICT)
- Website: http://www.ngewchiangrai.go.th/index.php

Ngio (Thai: งิ้ว) is a village and tambon (subdistrict) of Thoeng District, in Chiang Rai Province, Thailand. In 2005 it had a population of 12,589 people. The tambon 1 contains 25 villages.
