= Si Don Chai, Thoeng =

Coordinates: 19.6187°N 100.0735°E

Si Don Chai ศรีดอนไชย
- Tambon
- Interactive map of Si Don Chai
- Country: Thailand
- Province: Chiang Rai
- District: Thoeng

Population (2005)
  - Total: 4,892
- Time zone: UTC+7 (ICT)

Si Don Chai (Thai: ศรีดอนไชย) is a village and tambon (subdistrict) of Thoeng District, in Chiang Rai Province, Thailand. In 2005 it had a population of 4,892 people. The tambon contains nine villages.
