= Fang Daeng, That Phanom =

Subdistrict in Nakhon Phanom Province

Coordinates: 16°55′34″N 104°40′39″E

Fang Daeng ตำบลฝั่งแดง
- Subdistrict
- Motto: ฝั่งแดงน่าอยู่ เคียงคู่วัฒนธรรม ก้าวล้ำการศึกษา ขาวประชามีความสุขอย่างยั่งยืน
- Interactive map of Fang Daeng
- Country: Thailand
- Province: Nakhon Phanom
- District: That Phanom

Government
  - Type: Subdistrict Administrative Organization (SAO)
  - Head of SAO: Thotsaporn Sukwan

Population (2026)
  - Total: 3,670
- Time zone: UTC+7 (ICT)

Fang Daeng (Thai: ตำบลฝั่งแดง, pronounced [fˈaŋ dˈiːŋ]) is a tambon (subdistrict) of That Phanom District, in Nakhon Phanom province, Thailand. In 2026, it had a population of 3,670 people.

== History ==
Fang Daeng's early locals evacuated from Laos and created the subdistrict near the Deciduous Dipterocarp forest.

== Administration ==
=== Central administration ===
The tambon is divided into eleven administrative villages (mubans).

No.	Name	Thai	Population
1.	Thong Nuea	ต้องเหนือ	290
2.	Fang Daeng Kao	ฝั่งแดงเก่า	344
3.	Son Khon	สอนคอน	238
4.	Phon Sawang	โพนสว่าง	291
5.	Thong Tai	ต้องใต้	339
6.	Nong Peng	หนองเปง	451
7.	Porong	โป่รง	365
8.	Fang Daeng Mai	ฝั่งแดงใหม่	443
9.	Fang Daeng Pattana	ฝั่งแดงพัฒนา	289
10.	Mai Champa	ใหม่จำปา	427
11.	Thong Mai	ต้องใหม่	193
