= Fai Na Saeng =

Subdistrict in Phetchabun Province

Fai Na Saeng ตำบลฝายนาแซง
- Subdistrict
- Motto: ยึดมั่นในหลักการ บริหารแบบมีส่วนร่วม หลอมรวมให้เป็นหนึ่ง สู่การพัฒนาแบบยั่งยืน
- Country: Thailand
- Province: Phetchabun
- District: Lom Sak

Government
  - Type: Subdistrict Administrative Organization (SAO)
  - Head of SAO: Anek Tinoi

Population (2026)
  - Total: 2,327
- Time zone: UTC+7 (ICT)

Fai Na Saeng (Thai: ตำบลฝายนาแซง, pronounced [fˈa͡ɪ nˈɑː sˈiːŋ]) is a tambon (subdistrict) of Lom Sak District, in Phetchabun province, Thailand. In 2026, it had a population of 2,327 people.

== History ==
Fai Na Saeng became a tambon on December 25, 1996.

== Administration ==
=== Central administration ===
The tambon is divided into six administrative villages (mubans).

No.	Name	Thai	Population
1.	Tha Suan Mon	ท่าสวนมอญ	442
2.	Fai Na Saeng	ฝายนาแซง	382
3.	Bueng Nuea	บึงเหนือ	294
4.	Bueng Klang	บึงกลาง	250
5.	Bueng Tai	บึงใต้	592
6.	Huai Khok	ห้วยกอก	367
