= Doi Luang (disambiguation) =

Doi Luang, meaning 'Large Mountain', may refer to:

- Doi Luang, former name of Doi Inthanon, the highest mountain in Thailand
- Doi Luang, Phi Pan Nam Range, a 1,694 m high mountain in NW Phayao Province, Northern Thailand, the highest point of the Phi Pan Nam Range
- Doi Luang, Mae Chai, a 1,426 m high peak in the same range in Mae Chai District
  - Doi Luang National Park
- Doi Luang, Lampang Province, a 1,100 m high mountain in Lampang Province, Northern Thailand
- Doi Luang Mae Khun, a 1,334 m high mountain in Chiang Rai Province, Northern Thailand
- Doi Luang Pae Mueang, a 1,328 m high mountain in Chiang Khong District, Chiang Rai Province, Northern Thailand
- Doi Luang, Ban Na Fai, a 1,396 m high mountain between Song District, Phrae Province, and Ban Luang District, Nan Province, Northern Thailand
- Doi Luang District in Chiang Rai Province
