= Fai Kaeo =

Subdistrict in Nan Province

Fai Kaeo ตำบลฝายแก้ว
- Subdistrict
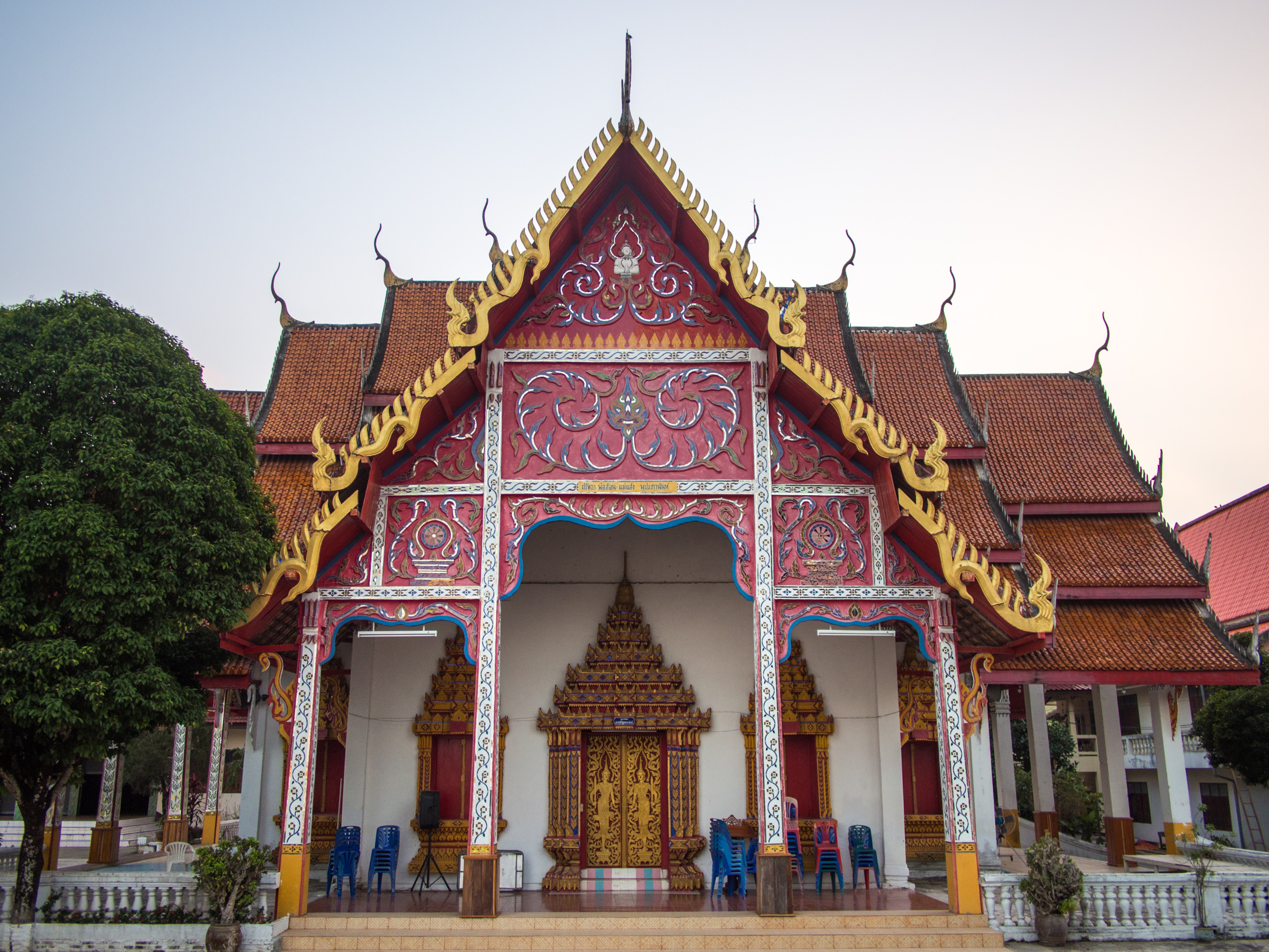
- Wat Tha Lo
- Motto: ตำบลน่าอยู่คู่ป่าต้นน้าสุขภาพดีการศึกษาเด่นเน้นโครงสร้างพื้นฐานบริหารตามหลักธรรมาภิบาล
- Country: Thailand
- Province: Nan
- District: Phu Phiang

Government
  - Type: Subdistrict Administrative Organization (SAO)
  - Head of SAO: Adul Sittiyot

Population (2026)
  - Total: 7,384
- Time zone: UTC+7 (ICT)

Fai Kaeo (Thai: ตำบลฝายแก้ว, pronounced [fˈa͡ɪ kˈiːə͡ʊ]) is a tambon (subdistrict) of Phu Phiang District, in Nan province, Thailand. In 2026, it had a population of 7,384 people.

== History ==
Fai Kaeo was ruled under Burma from 1703 to 1707. Nan was abandoned for five years. In 1708, the Burmese authorities sent the person, whose name is Chao Fa Mueang Khong, a ruler of Burmese origin, to govern Nan. Chao Fa Mueang Khong appointed Mr.In, a resident of Fai Kaeo, to the position of Phra Na Sai. Later, the King of the Kingdom of Ava replaced Chao Fa Mueang Khong with Chao Fa Myoza.

From 1714 to 1716, Chao Fa Myoza worked with Mr.In to restore the city. Mr.In relocated his family from Ban Fai Kaeo to Ban Dong Chang Pha (present-day Ban Tha Lo) and encouraged the local population to engage in agriculture. The settlement expanded toward the Nan River. In the past, carts were used extensively to transport stone and sand from the river port along the Nan River. As people gradually settled permanently in the area, the locals named the settlement Fai Kaeo.

== Administration ==
=== Central administration ===
The tambon is divided into seventeen administrative villages (mubans).

No.	Name	Thai	Population
1.	Tha Lor	ท่าล้อ	548
2.	Saeng Dao	แสงดาว	299
3.	Fai Kaeo	ฝายแก้ว	1,030
4.	Thung Noi	ทุ่งน้อย	801
5.	Nam Sai	น้ำใส	385
6.	Hua Wiang Nuea	หัวเวียงเหนือ	399
7.	Pua Chai	ปัวชัย	396
8.	Nam Tuan	น้ำต้วน	328
9.	Buppharam	บุปผาราม	498
10.	Dong Pasak	ดงป่าสัก	477
11.	Huai Kham	ห้วยคำ	207
12.	Haet	แหด	660
13.	Khang Ti	คั้งถี่	159
14.	Huai Hi	ห้วยไฮ	331
15.	Nikhom	นิคม	184
16.	Nong Charoen	หนองเจริญ	165
17.	Saengdao Pattana	แสงดาวพัฒนา	537
