= Fak Huai =

Subdistrict in Sa Kaeo Province

Fak Huai ตำบลฟากห้วย
- Subdistrict
- Motto: เทศบาลตำบลฟากห้วย เป็นเมืองน่าอยู่ด้วยการบริหารจัดการที่ดี มีการคมนาคมสะดวก เศรษฐกิจดี มีความรู้ทันสมัย เสริมสร้างสุขภาพ รักษาสิ่งแวดล้อม
- Country: Thailand
- Province: Sa Kaeo
- District: Aranyaprathet

Government
  - Type: Subdistrict Administrative Organization (SAO)
  - Head of SAO: Saman Bucharattanachai

Population (2026)
  - Total: 4,870
- Time zone: UTC+7 (ICT)

Fak Huai (Thai: ตำบลฟากห้วย, pronounced [fˈak hjˈuːa͡ɪ]) is a tambon (subdistrict) of Aranyaprathet District, in Sa Kaeo province, Thailand. In 2026, it had a population of 4,870 people.

== History ==
Fak Huai became a tambon in 2006.

== Administration ==
=== Central administration ===
The tambon is divided into six administrative villages (mubans).

No.	Name	Thai	Population
1.	Fak Huai	ฟากห้วย	709
2.	Fak Huai	ฟากห้วย	463
3.	Nong Phak Bung	หนองผักบุ้ง	414
4.	Kut Tae	กุดแต้	500
5.	Fai Taek	ฝายแตก	419
6.	Bung Khaen	บุ่งแคน	252
7.	Na Lau Prachasan	นาเหล่าประชาสรรค์	406
8.	Suan Udom	สวนอุดม	389
9.	Charoensuk	เจริญสุข	768
10.	Mai Nong Phak Bung	ใหม่หนองผักบุ้ง	274
11.	Nong Luang	หนองหลวง	276
