= Fang Daeng, Na Klang =

Subdistrict in Nakhon Phanom Province

Fang Daeng ตำบลฝั่งแดง
- Subdistrict
- Motto: สร้างสรรค์ ส่งเสริม ฝั่งแดงพัฒนา ก้าวสู่อนาคตที่มั่นคง
- Country: Thailand
- Province: Nong Bua Lamphu
- District: Na Klang

Government
  - Type: Subdistrict Administrative Organization (SAO)
  - Head of SAO: Suwitcha Paosiri

Population (2026)
  - Total: 10,214
- Time zone: UTC+7 (ICT)

Fang Daeng (Thai: ตำบลฝั่งแดง, pronounced [fˈaŋ dˈiːŋ]) is a tambon (subdistrict) of Na Klang District, in Nong Bua Lamphu province, Thailand. In 2026, it had a population of 10,214 people.

== History ==
Fang Daeng became a tambon in 1914 and had a thesaban on October 27, 2009.

== Administration ==
=== Central administration ===
The tambon is divided into eighteen administrative villages (mubans).

No.	Name	Thai	Population
1.	Ueang	เอื้อง	464
2.	Kan	ก่าน	470
3.	Non Than	โนนตาล	484
4.	Fang Daeng	ฝั่งแดง	540
5.	Wang Siem	วังเซียม	479
6.	Na Nong Thum	นาหนองทุ่ม	548
7.	Non That	โนนธาตุ	723
8.	Saeng Dao	แสงดาว	703
9.	Non Sa	โนนสา	221
10.	Non Rai	โนนไร่	272
11.	Fang Daeng Noi	ฝั่งแดงน้อย	307
12.	Sam Siao	ซำเสี้ยว	1,007
13.	Non Ngam	โนนงาม	855
14.	Sri Vilai	ศรีวิไล	764
15.	Saeng Arun	แสงอรุณ	505
16.	Suk Samran	สุขสำราญ	881
17.	Sa-nga Na Pieng	สง่านาเพียง	440
18.	Fang Daeng Klang	ฝั่งแดงกลาง	551
