= Erawan, Waeng =

Subdistrict in Narathiwat Province

Erawan ตำบลเอราวัณ
- Subdistrict
- Country: Thailand
- Province: Narathiwat
- District: Waeng

Government
  - Type: Subdistrict Administrative Organization (SAO)
  - Head of SAO: Awirut Yaseng

Population (2026)
  - Total: 3,772
- Time zone: UTC+7 (ICT)

Erawan (Thai: ตำบลเอราวัณ, pronounced [ɪɹˈawən]) is a tambon (subdistrict) of Waeng District, in Narathiwat province, Thailand. In 2026, it had a population of 3,772 people.

== History ==
Erawan's first kamnan is Mr.Yornyong Sarlae.

== Administration ==
=== Central administration ===
The tambon is divided into seven administrative villages (mubans).

| No. | Name | Thai | Population |
|---|---|---|---|
| 1. | Tu Malayu | ตือมายู | 951 |
| 2. | Khayaeng | แขยง | 581 |
| 3. | Ae Wae | แอแว | 711 |
| 4. | Jabae Duwor | จาแบดูวอ | 401 |
| 5. | Hin Sung | หินสูง | 360 |
| 6. | Tor Lae | ตอแล | 430 |
| 7. | Luboh Satoe | ลูโบ๊ะสะโต | 338 |
