= Erawan, Erawan =

Subdistrict in Loei Province

Erawan ตำบลเอราวัณ
- Subdistrict
- Motto: พัฒนาคุณภาพชีวิต ส่งเสริมเศรษฐกิจพอเพียง สร้างชุมชนเข้มแข็ง
- Country: Thailand
- Province: Loei
- District: Erawan

Government
  - Type: Subdistrict Administrative Organization (SAO)
  - Head of SAO: Chalerm Yothamat

Population (2026)
  - Total: 9,202
- Time zone: UTC+7 (ICT)

'Erawan (Thai: ตำบลเอราวัณ, pronounced [ɪɹˈawən]) is a tambon (subdistrict) of Erawan District, in Loei province, Thailand. In 2026, it had a population of 9,202 people.

== History ==
Erawan became a tambon in 1994 and later had a thesaban in July 18, 2008. The first kamnan of the subdistrict is Mr.Kammee Khunsaeng.

== Administration ==
=== Central administration ===
The tambon is divided into sixteen administrative villages (mubans).

No.	Name	Thai	Population
1.	Wang Lao	วังเลา	568
2.	Hua Phai	หัวฝาย	415
3.	Wang Muang	วังม่วง	574
4.	Hua Phai	หัวฝาย	562
5.	Khok Sawan	โคกสวรรค์	1,157
6.	Pong Srithon	โป่งศรีโทน	525
7.	Khok Rang	โคกรัง	820
8.	Porn Prasert	พรประเสริฐ	688
9.	Wang Prathum	วังประทุม	359
10.	Lao Yai	เหล่าใหญ่	394
11.	Hua Phai	หัวฝาย	625
12.	Sap Charoen	ทรัพย์เจริญ	311
13.	Non Thawon	โนนถาวร	581
14.	Porn Sawang	พรสว่าง	574
15.	Pong Srithon	โป่งศรีโทน	527
16.	Hua Phai	หัวฝาย	522
