= Fang Kham =

Subdistrict in Nakhon Phanom Province

Fang Kham ตำบลฝางคำ
- Subdistrict
- Motto: คุณภาพชีวิตดี ชุมชนเข้มแข็ง แหล่งชีววิถี การคมนาคมสะดวก ชาวประชามีส่วนร่วม
- Country: Thailand
- Province: Ubon Ratchathani
- District: Sirindhorn

Government
  - Type: Subdistrict Administrative Organization (SAO)
  - Head of SAO: Jarun Thampitak

Population (2026)
  - Total: 3,191
- Time zone: UTC+7 (ICT)

Fang Kham (Thai: ตำบลฝางคำ, pronounced [fˈaŋ kˈɑːm]) is a tambon (subdistrict) of Sirindhorn District, in Ubon Ratchathani province, Thailand. In 2026, it had a population of 3,191 people.

== History ==
Fang Kham was ruled under Non Klang subdistrict before getting separated in 1992.

== Administration ==
=== Central administration ===
The tambon is divided into eighteen administrative villages (mubans).

No.	Name	Thai	Population	Phu Yai Ban
1.	Kham Kom	คำก้อม	842	Somkid Bunchuai
2.	Fang Teng	ฝางเทิง	757	Onsee Kaenkham
3.	Non Jik	โนนจิก	687	Phayahongthong Sabatsi
4.	Fang Klang	คำกลาง	905	Piyamat Kaewwimol
