= Fao Rai =

Subdistrict in Nong Khai Province

Coordinates: 18°01′N 103°18′E

Fao Rai ตำบลเฝ้าไร่
- Subdistrict
- Motto: พัฒนาคุณภาพชีวิต ส่งเสริมค่านิยมวัฒนธรรม จัดการศึกษาเด็กเล็ก ให้มีคุณภาพ มีมาตรฐานการให้บริการ ตามหลักธรรมาภิบาล
- Interactive map of Fao Rai
- Country: Thailand
- Province: Nong Khai
- District: Fao Rai

Government
  - Type: Subdistrict Administrative Organization (SAO)
  - Head of SAO: Wutichai Saengphet

Population (2026)
  - Total: 6,377
- Time zone: UTC+7 (ICT)

Fao Rai (Thai: ตำบลเฝ้าไร่, pronounced [fˈa͡ʊ ɹˈa͡ɪ]) is a tambon (subdistrict) of Fao Rai District, in Nong Khai province, Thailand. In 2026, it had a population of 6,377 people.

== History ==
Fao Rai's old name was บ้านโคกมดง่าม because the mound around the area was home to a large number of weaver ants.

Fao Rai was originally under Soem Subdistrict. In 1976, it was separated and established as Fao Rai Subdistrict. On 1 April 1995, the government announced the establishment of Fao Rai district, comprising Fao Rai, Udomphon, Na Di, Nong Luang, and Wang Luang subdistrict, separated from Phon Phisai District.

In 1992, Fao Rai was established as a Subdistrict Council under the Subdistrict Administrative Organization Act. Fao Rai had a thesaban on July 18, 2008. The first mayor was Mr.Boonthep Thepa.

== Administration ==
=== Central administration ===
The tambon is divided into seventeen administrative villages (mubans).

No.	Name	Thai	Population
1.	Na Ham	นาฮำ	309
2.	Fao Rai	เฝ้าไร่	735
3.	Jap Mai	จับไม้	374
4.	Tha Hai Sok	ท่าหายโศก	476
5.	Na Ham Mai	นาฮำใหม่	323
6.	Nong Yang	หนองยาง	263
7.	Tha Samran	ท่าสำราญ	480
8.	Wang Chompoo	วังชมภู	393
9.	Sap Charoen	ทรัพย์เจริญ	273
10.	Meechai	มีชัย	351
11.	Phu Nguen	ภูเงิน	590
12.	Kaset Charoen	เกษตรเจริญ	239
13.	Mueang Thong	เมืองทอง	288
14.	Fao Rai Pattana	เฝ้าไร่พัฒนา	599
15.	Charoen Sri	เจริญศรี	181
16.	Porn Mongkol	พรมงคล	260
17.	Na Ham Pattana	นาฮำพัฒนา	243
