= Doi Ian =

Mountain in Thailand

- ดอยเอียน
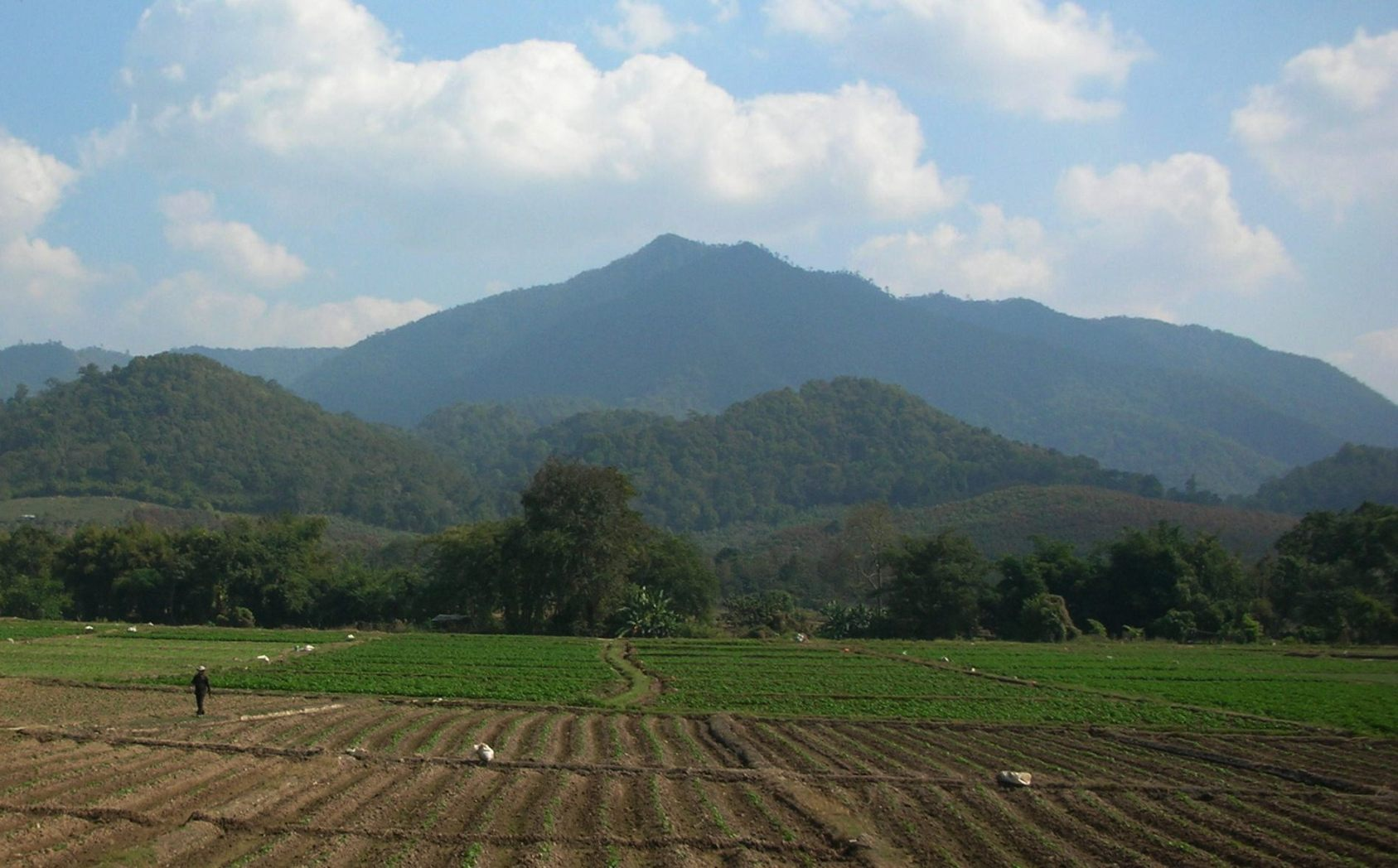
- Doi Ian from Tap Tao, east of Thoeng

Highest point
- Elevation: 1,174 m (3,852 ft)
- Listing: List of mountains in Thailand
- Coordinates: 19°42′12″N 100°19′19″E

Geography
- Location within Thailand
- Location: Thailand, Chiang Rai Province
- Parent range: Phi Pan Nam Range

Climbing
- First ascent: unknown
- Easiest route: drive from Thoeng, then hike

Doi Ian (Thai: ดอยเอียน) is a mountain in Thailand, part of the Phi Pan Nam Range, at the southeastern end of Chiang Rai Province limit near the point where the limit of this province meets with the northern end of Phayao Province, nine km from the border with Laos.

== Location ==
This mountain rises in Ngao Subdistrict, Thoeng District. Its summit is 12 km east of Thoeng, near Ngao east of the road going from it to Wiang Kaen town.

With a height of 1,174 metres Doi Ian is a conspicuous mountain in the surrounding landscape that can be seen from quite a distance over the plains near Thoeng town.

== Climate ==
Doi Ian

Climate chart (precipitation, max. and min. temperature)
J	F	M	A	M	J	J	A	S	O	N	D
29 26 16	7 29 18	46 31 21	105 32 22	205 28 22	165 26 19	385 26 22	343 24 19	259 24 20	108 24 20	96 25 18	35 24 16
- █ Average max. and min. temperatures in °C
- █ Precipitation totals in mm
Imperial conversion
J	F	M	A	M	J	J	A	S	O	N	D
1.1 79 61	0.3 84 64	1.8 88 70	4.1 90 72	8.1 82 72	6.5 79 66	15 79 72	14 75 66	10 75 68	4.3 75 68	3.8 77 64	1.4 75 61
- █ Average max. and min. temperatures in °F
- █ Precipitation totals in inches

== See also ==
- Thai highlands
- List of mountains in Thailand
