= Ekkarat =

Subdistrict in Ang Thong Province

Ekkarat ตำบลเอกราช
- Subdistrict
- Interactive map of Ekkarat
- Country: Thailand
- Province: Ang Thong
- District: Pa Mok

Government
  - Type: Subdistrict Administrative Organization (SAO)
  - Head of SAO: Sarawuk Phaopayak

Population (2026)
  - Total: 2,885
- Time zone: UTC+7 (ICT)

Ekkarat (Thai: ตำบลเอกราช, pronounced [ɛkɐɹˌat]) is a tambon (subdistrict) of Pa Mok District, in Ang Thong province, Thailand. In 2026, it had a population of 2,885 people.

== History ==
During the Ayutthaya Kingdom, the area of Pa Mok District held as a frontier town of Ayutthaya. It was also located along the military route used by King Naresuan when he led his army from Ayutthaya to fight against the Burmese. During the war, the army crossed the Chao Phraya River near the mouth of Bang Luang river until reaching Pa Mok district. While resting at Wat Pa Mok, King Naresuan reportedly had a dream in which he fought a giant crocodile.

The following morning, he performed a ceremonial ritual by cutting wood to suppress an omen and proclaimed independence at Ekkarat subdistrict.

== Administration ==
=== Central administration ===
The tambon is divided into eight administrative villages (mubans).

No.	Name	Thai	Population	Phu Yai Ban
1.	Bang Phae	บางแพ	212	Waewdao Khannguen
2.	Bang Phae	บางแพ	271	Kittiphong Woraphut
3.	Bang Phong	บางพงษ์	371	Somchai Mongkolphot
4.	Bang Phong	บางพงษ์	461	Nonglak Khamchai
5.	Makham Rieng	มะขามเรียง	783	Prayul Reanmanat
6.	Pak Nam	ปากน้ำ	359	Kritsanna Neamphan
7.	Bang Phae	บางแพ	182	Kittiphon Suphapwai
8.	Bang Phae	บางแพ	246	Chetta Phongkeha
