= Thoeng district =

Thoeng เทิง
- District
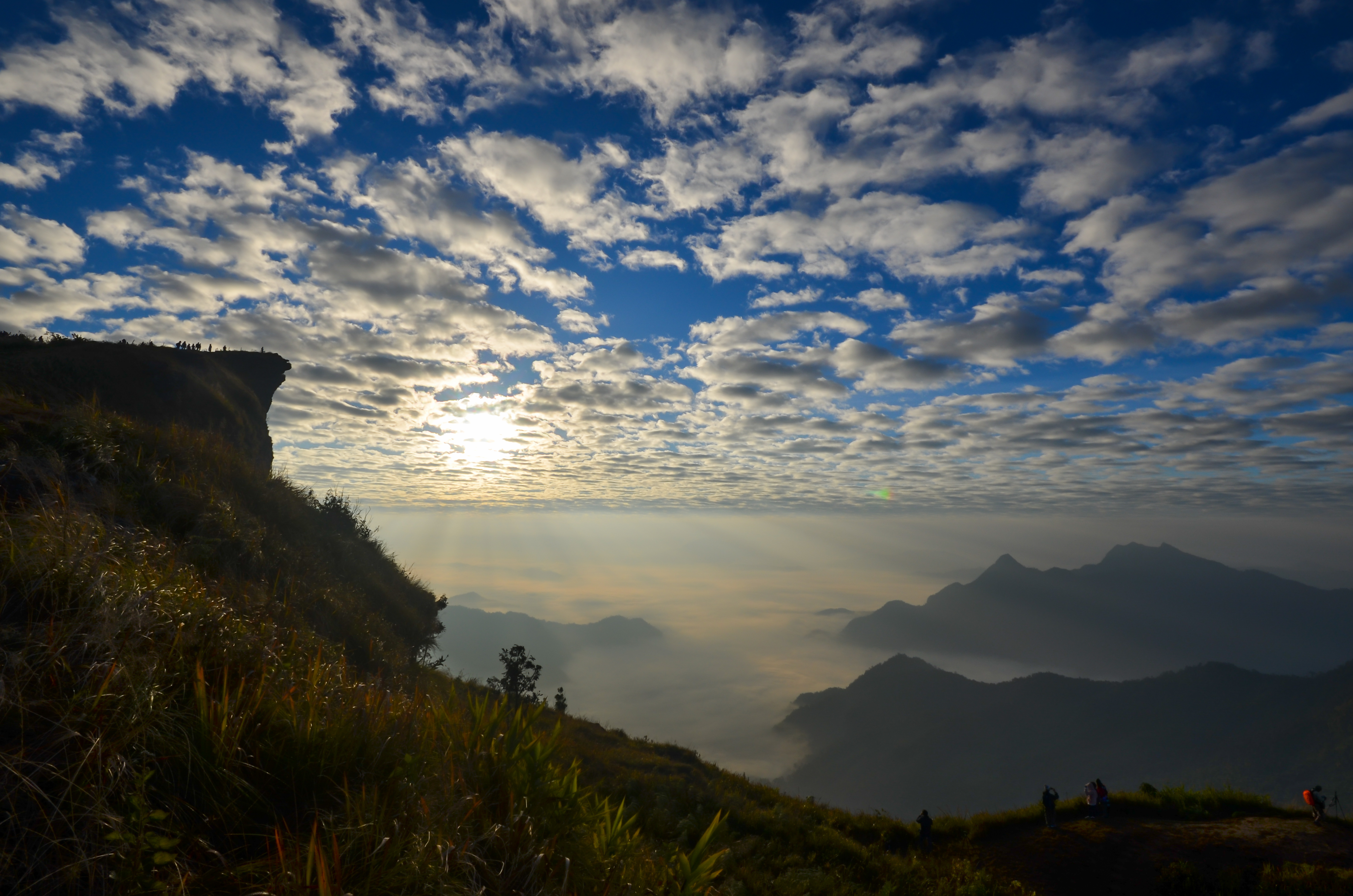
- Phu Chi Fa

- District location in Chiang Rai province
- Coordinates: 19°41′8″N 100°11′37″E
- Country: Thailand
- Province: Chiang Rai

Area
  - Total: 821.0 km^{2} (317.0 sq mi)

Population (2005)
  - Total: 84,507
  - Density: 102.9/km^{2} (267/sq mi)
- Time zone: UTC+7 (ICT)
- Postal code: 57160
- Geocode: 5704

Thoeng (Thai: เทิง; IPA: [tʰɤ̄ːŋ]) is a district (amphoe) in the eastern part of Chiang Rai province, northern Thailand.

== Geography ==
Neighboring districts are (from the southwest clockwise) Pa Daet, Mueang Chiang Rai, Wiang Chai, Phaya Mengrai, Khun Tan, and Wiang Kaen of Chiang Rai Province. To the east is Bokeo province of Laos, and to the south is Phayao province.

Thoeng is a mountainous district. The conspicuous 1,174 m high Doi Ian rises 12 km to the east and 823 m high Doi Kham rises four km south of the town between Thoeng and Chiang Kham. There are some higher mountains in the east of the district such as 1,013 m high Doi Pha Mon and 1,442 m high Phu Chi Fa at the border with Wiang Kaen District. The Ing River, with its source in the Phi Pan Nam Range (Doi Luang in Mae Chai district, Phayao Province) flows through the plain area of Thoeng. Other rivers in the area are the Lao River, a tributary of the Kok River, from Doi Phu Lang Ka, Chiang Kham district, in the north and Ngao River from Doi Pha Mon and the Plong River.

== Administration ==
The district is divided into 10 subdistricts (tambons), which are further subdivided into 175 villages (mubans). There are two townships (thesaban tambons): Wiang Thoeng covers parts of tambon Wiang, and Ban Plong covers parts of tambon Plong. There are a further 10 sub-district administrative organizations (SAO).

No.	Name	Thai name	Villages	Pop.
1.	Wiang	เวียง	24	16,004
2.	Ngio	งิ้ว	23	12,589
3.	Plong	ปล้อง	12	8,612
4.	Mae Loi	แม่ลอย	13	7,015
5.	Chiang Khian	เชียงเคี่ยน	10	4,655
9.	Tap Tao	ตับเต่า	26	12,252
10.	Ngao	หงาว	20	9,943
11.	San Sai Ngam	สันทรายงาม	7	4,308
12.	Si Don Chai	ศรีดอนไชย	9	4,892
13.	Nong Raet	หนองแรด	7	4,237

Missing numbers belong to tambons which now form Khun Tan District.
