= Doi Lan (Phi Pan Nam Range) =

Mountain in Chiang Rai province, Thailand

- ดอยลาน
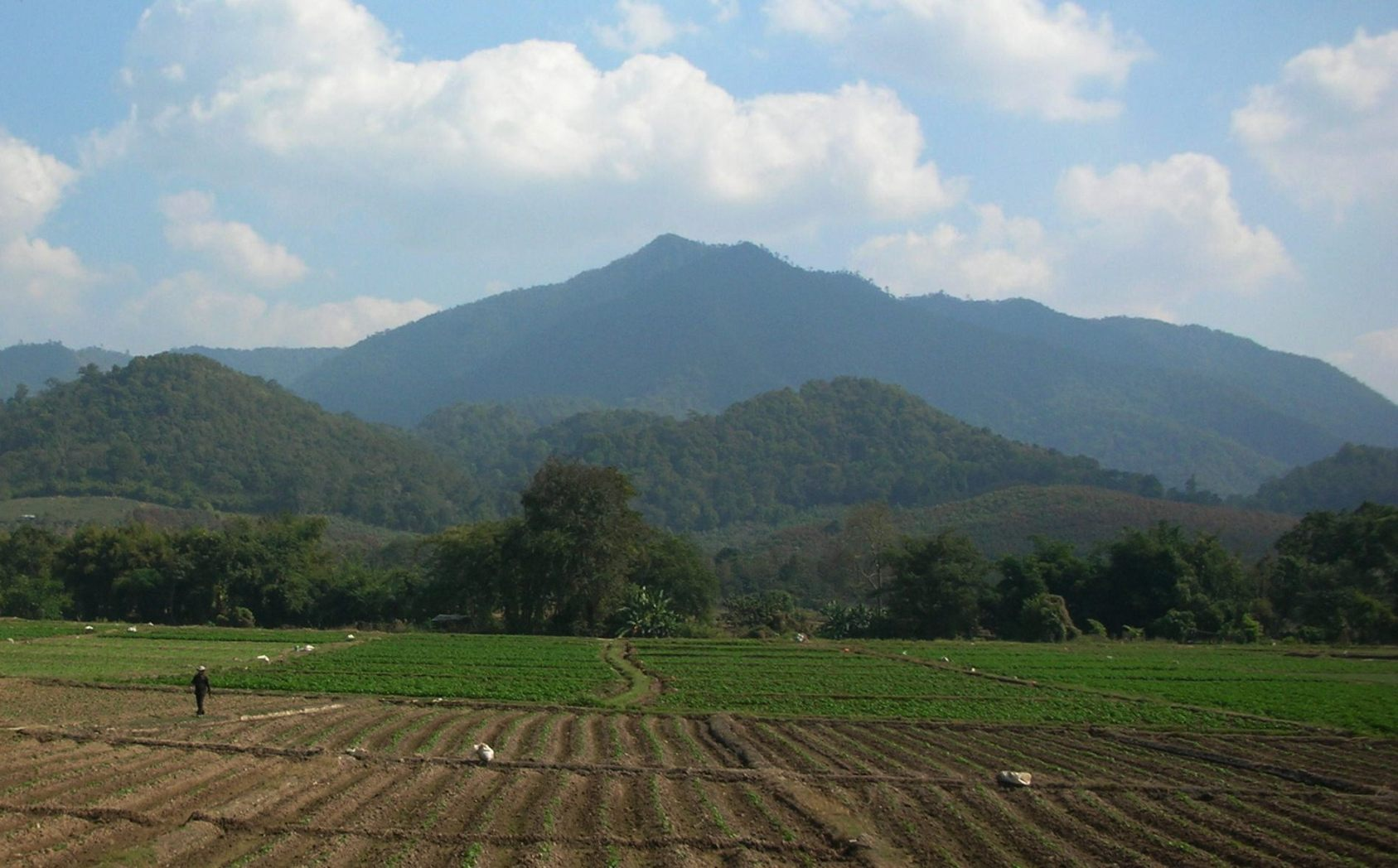
- Doi Lan as viewed from Tap Tao

Highest point
- Elevation: 559 m (1,834 ft)
- Listing: List of mountains in Thailand
- Coordinates: 19°40′30.3″N 99°56′36.6″E

Geography
- Location within Thailand
- Location: Thailand, Chiang Rai Province
- Parent range: Phi Pan Nam Range

Climbing
- First ascent: unknown

Doi Lan (Thai: ดอยลาน) is a mountain in Thailand, part of the Phi Pan Nam Range, in the center of Chiang Rai Province, south of Chiang Rai Town. With a height of 559 metres (1,834 ft) Doi Lan gives its name to the Doi Lan Subdistrict of Mueang Chiang Rai District.

This mountain is a small karstic mountain that rises north of the Buddhist temple named Phrathat Doi Lan after it.

== See also ==
- Thai highlands
- List of mountains in Thailand
