= Ngao, Thoeng =

Coordinates: 19.6736°N 100.2583°E

Ngao หงาว
- Subdistrict
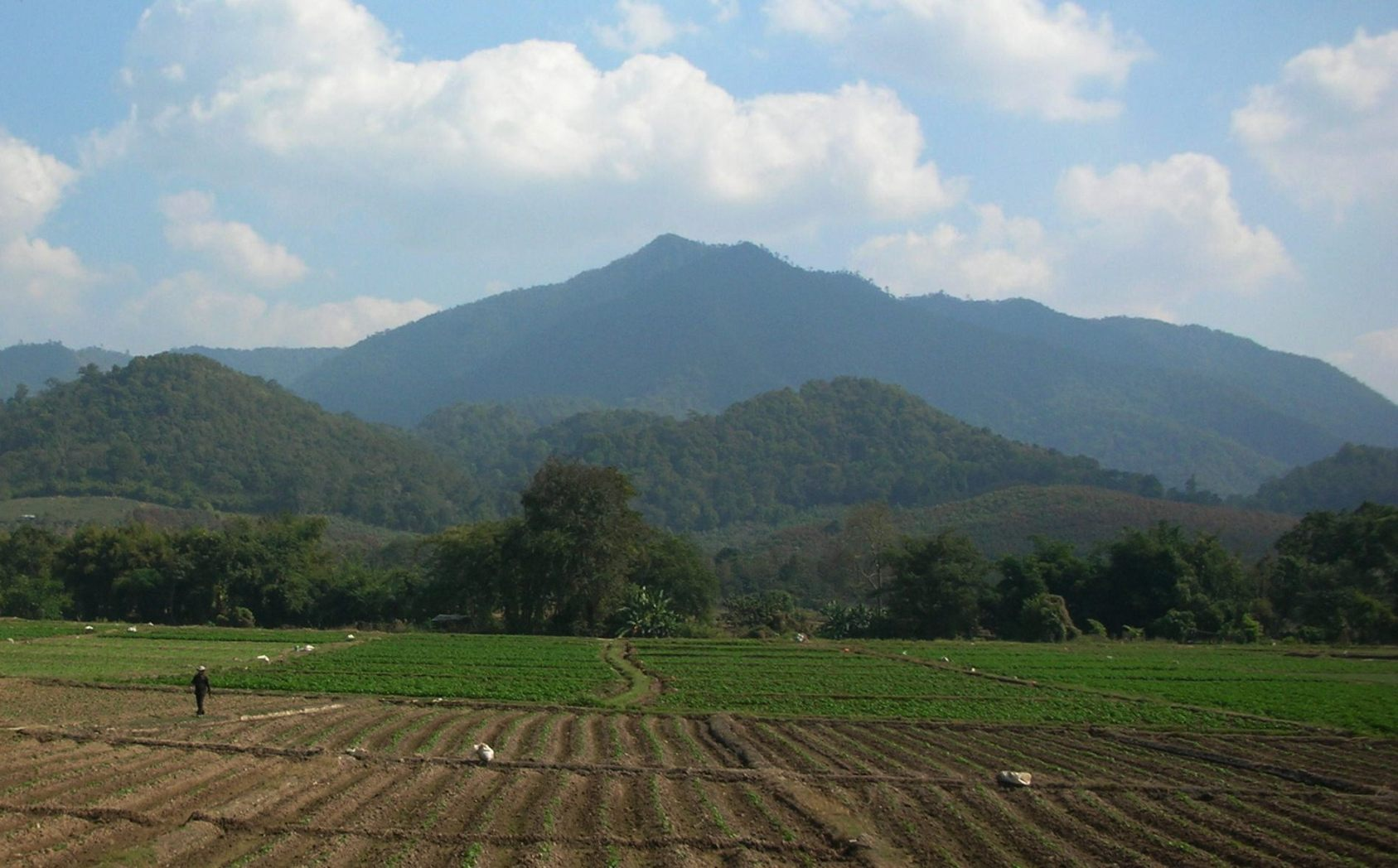
- Doi Ian roughly 5 km east of Ngao
- Interactive map of Ngao
- Country: Thailand
- Province: Chiang Rai
- District: Thoeng

Population (2005)
  - Total: 9,943
- Time zone: UTC+7 (ICT)

Ngao (Thai: หงาว) is a village and tambon (subdistrict) of Thoeng District, in Chiang Rai Province, Thailand. In 2005 it had a population of 9,943 people. The tambon contains 20 villages.

The conspicuous Doi Ian mountain is in Ngao Subdistrict.
