= Chiang Kham district =

Chiang Kham เชียงคำ
- District
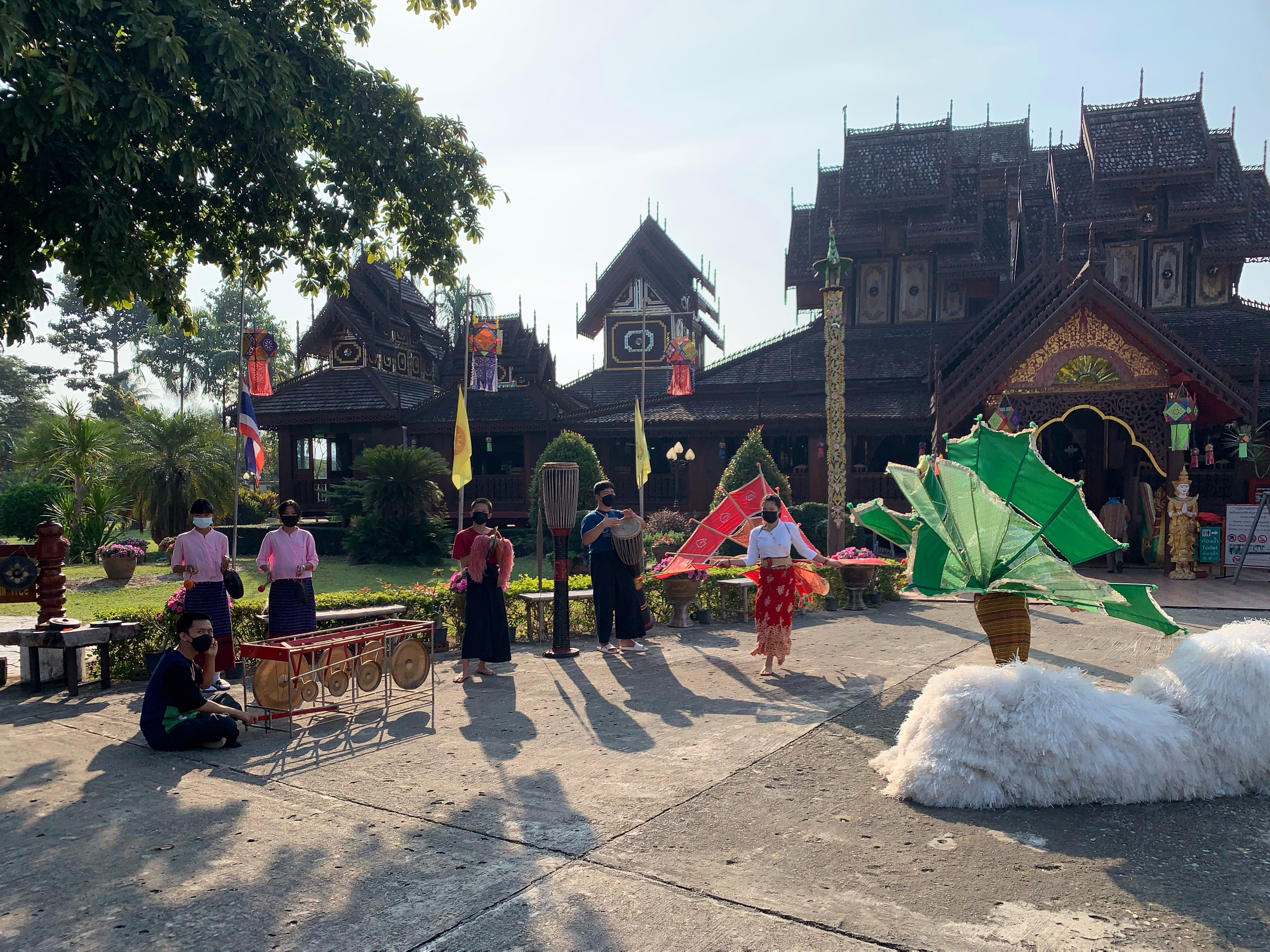
- Tai Lue performance at Wat Nantaram

- District location in Phayao province
- Coordinates: 19°31′24″N 100°18′6″E
- Country: Thailand
- Province: Phayao
- Subdistricts: 10
- Mubans: 135

Area
  - Total: 784.061 km^{2} (302.728 sq mi)

Population (2015)
  - Total: 77,194
  - Density: 98.5/km^{2} (255/sq mi)
- Time zone: UTC+7 (ICT)
- Postal code: 56110
- Geocode: 5603

Chiang Kham (Thai: เชียงคำ, pronounced [tɕʰīaŋ kʰām]; Northern Thai: ᨩ᩠ᨿᨦᨤᩴᩣ, pronounced [tɕīaŋ kʰām]) is a district (amphoe) in the northeastern part of Phayao province, northern Thailand.

== Geography ==
Neighboring districts are (from the south clockwise): Pong, Chun of Phayao Province; Thoeng of Chiang Rai province; and Phu Sang of Phayao Province. To the northeast is Xaignabouli province of Laos.

== Administration ==
=== Central administration ===
Chiang Kham district is divided into 10 sub-districts (tambons), which are further subdivided into 135 administrative villages (mubans).

No.	Name	Thai	Villages	Pop.
1.	Yuan	หย่วน	15	11,522
6.	Nam Waen	น้ำแวน	14	7,133
7.	Wiang	เวียง	10	5,672
8.	Fai Kwang	ฝายกวาง	17	8,843
9.	Chedi Kham	เจดีย์คำ	12	5,987
10.	Rom Yen	ร่มเย็น	22	12,259
11.	Chiang Ban	เชียงบาน	11	7,443
12.	Mae Lao	แม่ลาว	14	6,485
13.	Ang Thong	อ่างทอง	13	8,383
14.	Thung Pha Suk	ทุ่งผาสุข	7	3,467

=== Local administration ===
There are four sub-district municipalities (thesaban tambons) in the district:

- Chiang Kham (Thai: เทศบาลตำบลเชียงคำ) consisting of parts of sub-district Yuan.
- Wiang (Thai: เทศบาลตำบลเวียง) consisting of sub-district Wiang.
- Fai Kwang (Thai: เทศบาลตำบลฝายกวาง) consisting of sub-district Fai Kwang.
- Yuan (Thai: เทศบาลตำบลหย่วน) consisting of parts of sub-district Yuan.

There are seven sub-district administrative organizations (SAO) in the district:

- Nam Waen (Thai: องค์การบริหารส่วนตำบลน้ำแวน) consisting of sub-district Nam Waen.
- Chedi Kham (Thai: องค์การบริหารส่วนตำบลเจดีย์คำ) consisting of sub-district Chedi Kham.
- Rom Yen (Thai: องค์การบริหารส่วนตำบลร่มเย็น) consisting of sub-district Rom Yen.
- Chiang Ban (Thai: องค์การบริหารส่วนตำบลเชียงบาน) consisting of sub-district Chiang Ban.
- Mae Lao (Thai: องค์การบริหารส่วนตำบลแม่ลาว) consisting of sub-district Mae Lao.
- Ang Thong (Thai: องค์การบริหารส่วนตำบลอ่างทอง) consisting of sub-district Ang Thong.
- Thung Pha Suk (Thai: องค์การบริหารส่วนตำบลทุ่งผาสุข) consisting of sub-district Thung Pha Suk.
