= Wiang =

Wiang is a Tai word for "fortified settlement" or "walled town, city" of Austroasiatic origin, from Proto-Austroasiatic *wa(a)ŋ. This toponymic element forms part of the names of certain ancient inhabited places located in an area stretching across Northern Thailand and Laos:

- Wiang Chan, Vientiane (Lao: ວຽງຈັນ, Viang chan), the capital of Laos
- Wiang, Fang, Chiang Mai Province, Thailand
- Wiang Kaen, Chiang Rai Province, Thailand
- Wiang, Phrao, Chiang Mai Province, Thailand
- Wiang, Mueang Chiang Rai, Chiang Rai Province, Thailand
- Wiang, Chiang Khong, Chiang Rai Province, Thailand
- Wiang, Thoeng, Chiang Rai Province, Thailand
- Wiang, Chiang Saen, Chiang Rai Province, Thailand
- Wiang Pa Pao District, Chiang Rai Province, Thailand
  - Wiang, Wiang Pa Pao
  - Wiang Kalong
- Wiang, Phayao, Phayao Province, Thailand
- Wiang Nuea, Mueang Lampang
  - Wiang Nuea Subdistrict, Lampang
- Wiang Nuea, Pai
- Wiang Nuea, Mae Hong Son
- Wiang Chai District, Chiang Rai Province, Thailand
  - Wiang Chai Subdistrict
  - Wiang Nuea, Wiang Chai
- Wiang Kao District, Khon Kaen Province
- Wiang Sa District, Nan
- Wiang Haeng District, Chiang Mai Province
- Wiang Chiang Rung District
- Wiang Yong, Mueang Lamphun District
- Wiang Tai, Pai District, Mae Hong Son Province
- Wiang Hao, Phan District, in Chiang Rai Province
- Wiang Nong Long District, Lamphun Province
- Wiang Phang Kham, Mae Sai District, Chiang Rai Province
- Phu Wiang District, Khon Kaen Province
- Rop Wiang, Chiang Rai Province, Thailand
- Wiang Kum Kam, Saraphi District, Chiang Mai Province. Recently restored settlement along the Ping River, which was built by King Mangrai as his capital before he moved it to Chiang Mai
- Wiang Fa Ya, name of the old settlement of Muang Sing, Laos
- Wiang Suan Dok, name of a walled settlement of the Lawa people older than Chiang Mai
- Wiang Nophaburi, name of the place where king Mangrai founded his new city of Chiang Mai

== See also ==
- Chiang (place name)
- Lao Wiang
- Mandala (Southeast Asian political model)
- Mueang
- Tusi
- Wiang Subdistrict (disambiguation)
