= Wiang Nuea =

Wiang Nuea may refer to:

- Wiang Nuea, Mueang Lampang
- Wiang Nuea, Pai
- Wiang Nuea, Wiang Chai

== See also ==
- Wiang (disambiguation)
