= Wiang Subdistrict =

Wiang Subdistrict is the name of the following tambon (subdistricts) in Thailand:

- Wiang Subdistrict, Fang District, in Chiang Mai Province
- Wiang Subdistrict, Phrao District, in Chiang Mai Province
- Wiang Subdistrict, Mueang Chiang Rai District, in Chiang Rai Province
- Wiang Subdistrict, Chiang Saen District, in Chiang Rai Province
- Wiang Subdistrict in Chiang Khong District, Chiang Rai Province
- Wiang Subdistrict in Thoeng District, Chiang Rai Province
- Wiang Subdistrict in Wiang Pa Pao District, Chiang Rai Province
- Wiang Subdistrict in Mueang Phayao District, Phayao Province
- Wiang Subdistrict in Chiang Kham District, Phayao Province
- Wiang Subdistrict in Chaiya District, Surat Thani Province

== See also ==
- Wiang (disambiguation)
