= Wiang Chai =

Wiang Chai may refer to:

- Wiang Chai District
- Wiang Chai Subdistrict
