= Nam Phrae =

Nam Phrae may refer to several places in Thailand:

- Nam Phrae, Hang Dong
- Nam Phrae, Phrao
