= Mường Lát district =

Coordinates: 20.500°N 104.583°E

Mường Lát district Huyện Mường Lát
- District
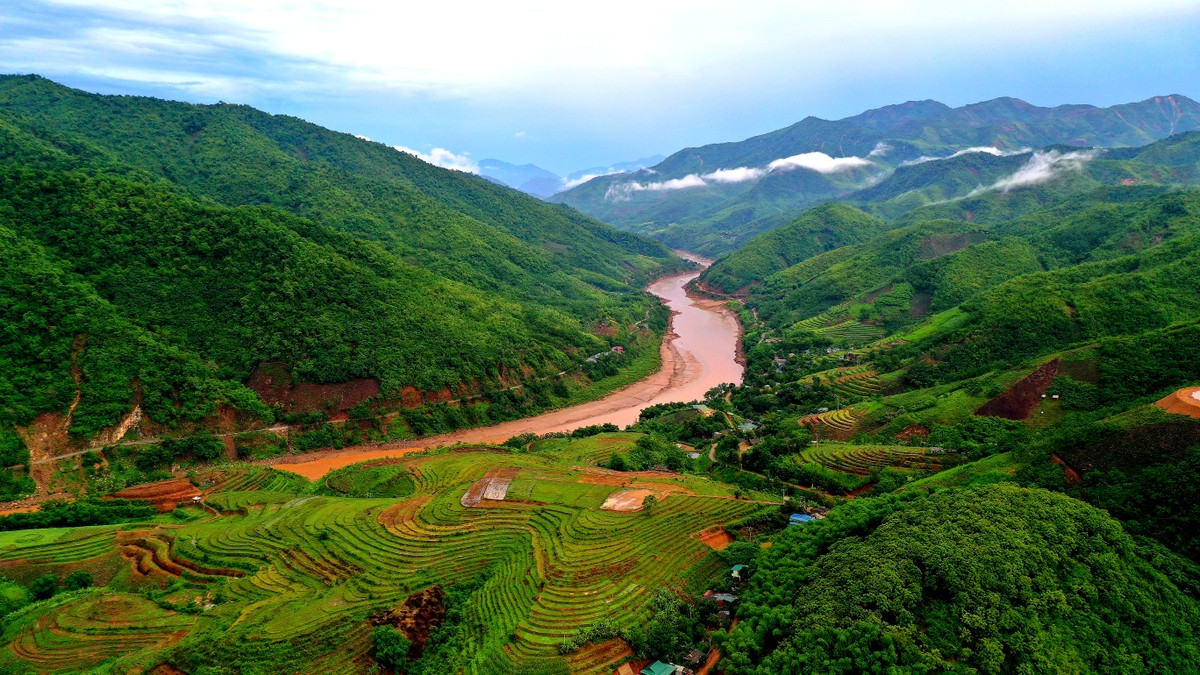
- Interactive map of Mường Lát district
- Country: Vietnam
- Region: North Central Coast
- Province: Thanh Hóa
- Established: November 18, 1996
- Capital: Mường Lát

Area
  - District: 312.99 sq mi (810.65 km^{2})

Population (2018)
  - District: 41,640
  - Density: 130/sq mi (51/km^{2})
  - Urban: 7,084
- Time zone: UTC+7 (UTC + 7)

Mường Lát is a district (huyện) of Thanh Hóa province in the North Central Coast region of Vietnam.

As of 2018, the district had a population of 41,640. The district covers an area of 810.65 km^{2} (312.99 sq mi). The district capital lies at Mường Lát town.

== Municipalities ==
Name	Area (km²)	Population	Density (people/km^{2)}	Statistical Years
Mường Lát (town) (District capital)	129.66	7,084	55	2019
Mường Chanh	64.98	2,546	39	1999
Mường Lý	120.09	3,874	32	1999
Nhi Sơn	36.85	2,029	55	2008
Pù Nhi	67.55	3,754	56	2008
Quang Chiểu	108.75	4,343	40	1999
Tam Chung	121.98	1,622	13	2003
Trung Lý	162.3	4,263	26	1999
