= Mueang =

Premodern city states in peninsular Southeast Asia

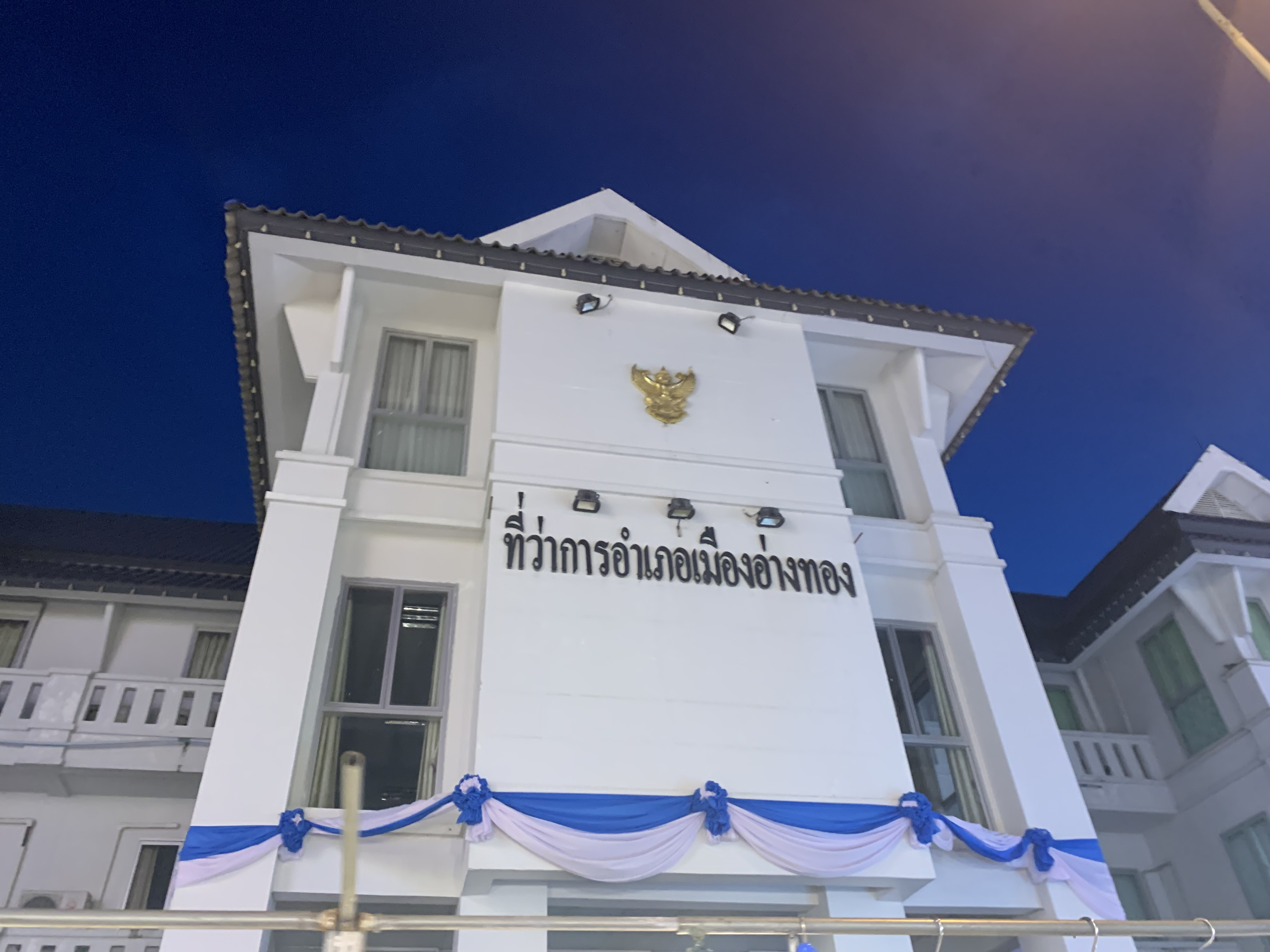
Capital districts of provinces in Thailand are referred to as "mueang district". Pictured here is the office of Mueang Ang Thong district, i.e., the capital district of Ang Thong.

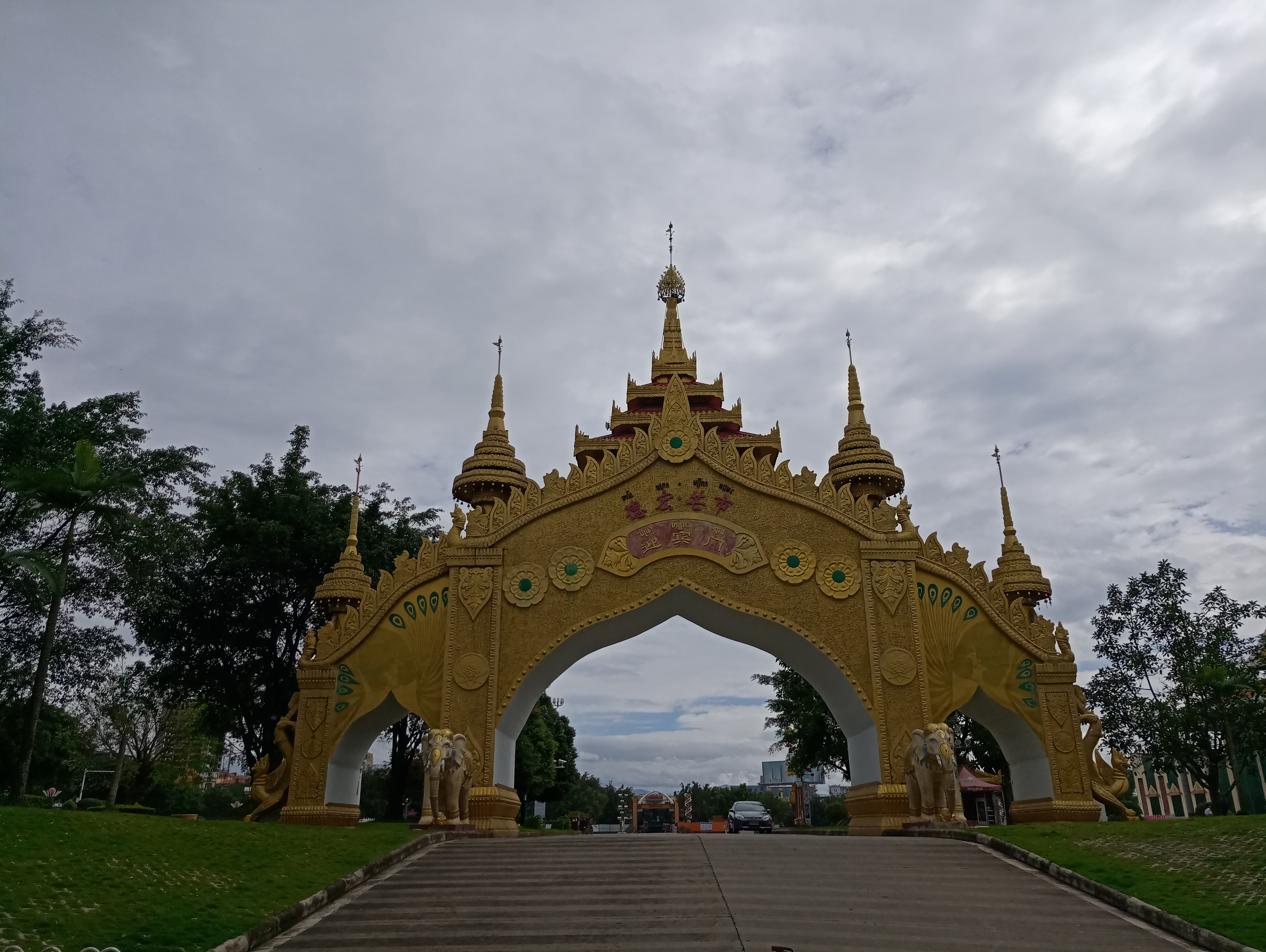
The ethnic Tai Nuea name of Mangshi (pictured) in Yunnan, China is Mueang Khon

Mueang (Ahom: 𑜉𑜢𑜤𑜂𑜫;Thai: เมือง mɯ̄ang, pronounced [mɯaŋ˧]), Muang (Lao: ເມືອງ mɯ́ang, pronounced [mɯaŋ˦]), Möng (Tai Nuea: ᥛᥫᥒᥰ möeng; Shan: မိူင်း móeng, pronounced [məŋ˦]), Meng (Chinese: 猛 or 勐) or Mường (Vietnamese) were pre-modern semi-independent city-states or principalities in mainland Southeast Asia, adjacent regions of Northeast India and Southern China, including what is now Thailand, Laos, Burma, Cambodia, parts of northern Vietnam, southern Yunnan, western Guangxi and Assam.

Mueang was originally a term in the Tai languages for a town having a defensive wall and a ruler with at least the Thai noble rank of khun (ขุน), together with its dependent villages. The mandala model of political organisation organised states in collective hierarchy such that smaller mueang were subordinate to more powerful neighboring ones, which in turn were subordinate to a central king or other leader. The more powerful mueang (generally designated as chiang, wiang, nakhon, or krung – with Bangkok as Krung Thep Maha Nakhon) occasionally tried to liberate themselves from their suzerain and could enjoy periods of relative independence. Mueang large and small often shifted allegiance, and frequently paid tribute to more than one powerful neighbor – the most powerful of the period being Ming China.

Following Kublai Khan's defeat of the Dali Kingdom of the Bai people in 1253 and its establishment as a tutelary state, new mueang were founded widely throughout the Shan States and adjoining regions – though the common description of this as a "mass migration" is disputed. Following historical Chinese practice, tribal leaders principally in Yunnan were recognized by the Yuan as imperial officials, in an arrangement generally known as the Tusi ("Native Chieftain") system. Ming and Qing-era dynasties gradually replaced native chieftains with non-native Chinese government officials.

In the 19th century, Thailand's Chakri dynasty and Burma's colonial and subsequent military rulers did much the same with their lesser mueang, but, while the petty kingdoms are gone, the place names remain.

== Place names ==
Place names in Southwestern Tai languages

=== Cambodia ===
In Khmer, "moeang" (មឿង) is a word borrowed from the Thai language meaning "small city" or "small town." Usually used as a place name for villages.

- Moeang Char
- Moeang Prachen

=== China ===
The placename "mueang" is written in Chinese characters as 勐, 孟; měng, which is equivalent to Tai Nüa: ᥛᥫᥒᥰ and Tai Lü: ᦵᦙᦲᧂ, both of which are spoken in China.

Script in English	Name in Tai Nuea	Name in Tai Lue	Script in Chinese	Common used name
Möng Mao	ᥛᥫᥒᥰ ᥛᥣᥝᥰ		勐卯	Ruili
Möng Hkwan	ᥛᥫᥒᥰ ᥑᥩᥢᥴ	ᦵᦙᦲᧂ ᦃᦸᧃ	勐焕	Mangshi
Möng Wan	ᥛᥫᥒᥰ ᥝᥢᥰ		勐宛	Longchuan
Möng Ti	ᥛᥫᥒᥰ ᥖᥤᥰ		勐底	Lianghe
Möng Na	ᥛᥫᥒᥰ ᥘᥣᥲ		勐腊	Yingjiang
Moeng La (Hò)		ᦵᦙᦲᧂ ᦟᦱ	勐拉	Simao
Moeng La		ᦵᦙᦲᧂ ᦟᦱᧉ	勐腊	Mengla
Moeng Hai	ᥛᥫᥒᥰ ᥞᥣᥭᥰ	ᦵᦙᦲᧂ ᦣᦻ	勐海	Menghai
Möng Lem	ᥛᥫᥒᥰ ᥘᥥᥛᥰ		孟连	Menglian
Möng Cheng	ᥛᥫᥒᥰ ᥐᥪᥒ		勐耿	Gengma
Möng Long	ᥛᥫᥒᥰ ᥘᥨᥒ			Longling
Möng Möng	ᥛᥫᥒᥰ ᥛᥫᥒᥰ		勐勐	Shuangjiang
Meng Lam or Möng Lang	ᥛᥫᥒᥰ ᥘᥣᥛᥰ		勐朗	Lancang
Möng Htong	ᥛᥫᥒᥰ ᥗᥨᥒᥴ		勐统	Changning
Meng Tsung	ᥛᥫᥒᥰ ᥓᥧᥒᥰ			Yuanjiang
Meng Then or Möng Hköng	ᥛᥫᥒᥰ ᥗᥦᥢᥴ			Fengqing
Möng Myen	ᥛᥫᥒᥰ ᥛᥦᥢᥰ		勐缅	Tengchong or Lincang
Möng Sè or Moeng Sae	ᥛᥫᥒᥰ ᥔᥥᥴ	ᦵᦙᦲᧂ ᦵᦉ		Kunming
Meng Ha	ᥛᥫᥒᥰ ᥑᥣᥰ			Kejie Town
Meng Ha or Möng Ya	ᥛᥫᥒᥰ ᥑᥣᥴ			Wandian Dai Ethnic Township
Möng Hkö	ᥛᥫᥒᥰ ᥑᥫᥰ			Lujiang Town
Möng Nyim	ᥛᥫᥒᥰ ᥒᥤᥛᥰ		勐允	Shangyun Town
Moeng Cae	ᥛᥫᥒᥰ ᥓᥥ	ᦵᦙᦲᧂ ᦵᦵᦋᧈ	勐遮	Mengzhe Town
Möng Hsa	ᥛᥫᥒᥰ ᥔᥣᥴ		勐撒	Mengsa Town
Möng Yang	ᥛᥫᥒᥰ ᥕᥣᥒᥰ		勐养	Mengyang Town
Möng Tum	ᥛᥫᥒᥰ ᥖᥧᥛᥰ		勐董	Mengdong
Meng Ten	ᥛᥫᥒᥰ ᥖᥦᥢᥰ		勐典	Mengdian (a place in Yingjiang County)
Möng Ting	ᥛᥫᥒᥰ ᥖᥤᥒ		孟定	Mengding Town
Meng Lim	ᥛᥫᥒᥰ ᥘᥤᥛᥴ			Huangcao-Ba (黄草坝, a place in Longling County)
Moeng Luang	ᥛᥫᥒᥰ ᥘᥨᥒ	ᦵᦙᦲᧂ ᦷᦟᧂ	勐龙	Menglong Town
Meng Loong	ᥛᥫᥒᥰ ᥘᥩᥒᥴ		勐弄	Mengnong Township
Möng Maw	ᥛᥫᥒᥰ ᥛᥨᥝᥱ		勐磨	Jiucheng Township
Moeng Ham	ᥛᥫᥒᥰ ᥞᥛᥰ	ᦵᦙᦲᧂ ᦣᧄ	勐罕	Menghan Town
Meng Heu	ᥛᥫᥒᥰ ᥞᥥᥝᥰ		勐秀	Mengxiu Township
Meng Ka	ᥛᥫᥒᥰ ᥐᥣ		勐戛	Mengga
Meng Yue			勐约	Mengyue Township
Möng Hpawng or Moeng Phong		ᦵᦙᦲᧂ ᦘᦳᧂ	勐捧	Mengpeng Town
Meng Dui			勐堆	Mengdui Township
Meng Ku			勐库	Mengku Town
Meng Yoong	ᥛᥫᥒᥰ ᥕᥩᥒᥰ		勐永	MengYong Town
Meng Keng	ᥛᥫᥒᥰ ᥐᥦᥒᥰ		勐简	Mengjian Township
Meng Seng	ᥛᥫᥒᥰ ᥔᥫᥒᥴ		勐省	Mengsheng
Meng Jiao			勐角	Mengjiao Dai, Yi and Lahu People Township
Meng Nuo			勐糯	Mengnuo Town
Meng Xian			勐先	Mengxian Town
Meng Nong			孟弄	Mengnong Yi Ethnic Township
Möng Pan			勐班	Mengban Township
Meng Da			勐大	Mengda Town
Moeng Lae			勐烈	Menglie Town
Meng Ma			勐马	Mengma Town
Meng Suo			勐梭	Mengsuo Town
Meng Ka			勐卡	Mengka Town
Meng La			勐拉	Mengla Town
Meng Qiao			勐桥	Mengqiao Township
Meng Òng			勐旺	Mengwang Township, Jinghong
Moeng Hun			勐混	Menghun Town
Moeng Man			勐满	Mengman Town
Meng A			勐阿	Meng'a Town
Meng Song			勐宋	Mengsong Township
Moeng Òng			勐往	Mengwang Township, Menghai
Moeng Nun			勐仑	Menglun Town
Meng Ban			勐伴	Mengban Town

=== Laos ===
Laos is colloquially known as Muang Lao, but for Lao people, the word conveys more than mere administrative district. The usage is of special historic interest for the Lao; in particular for their traditional socio-political and administrative organisation, and the formation of their early (power) states, described by later scholars as Mandala (Southeast Asian political model). Provinces of Laos are now subdivided into what are commonly translated as districts of Laos, with some retaining Muang as part of the name:

- Muang Sing
- Muang Xay
- Former Muang
  - Muang Phuan (modern Phonsavan, capital city of Xiangkhouang Province)
  - Muang Sua

=== Myanmar ===
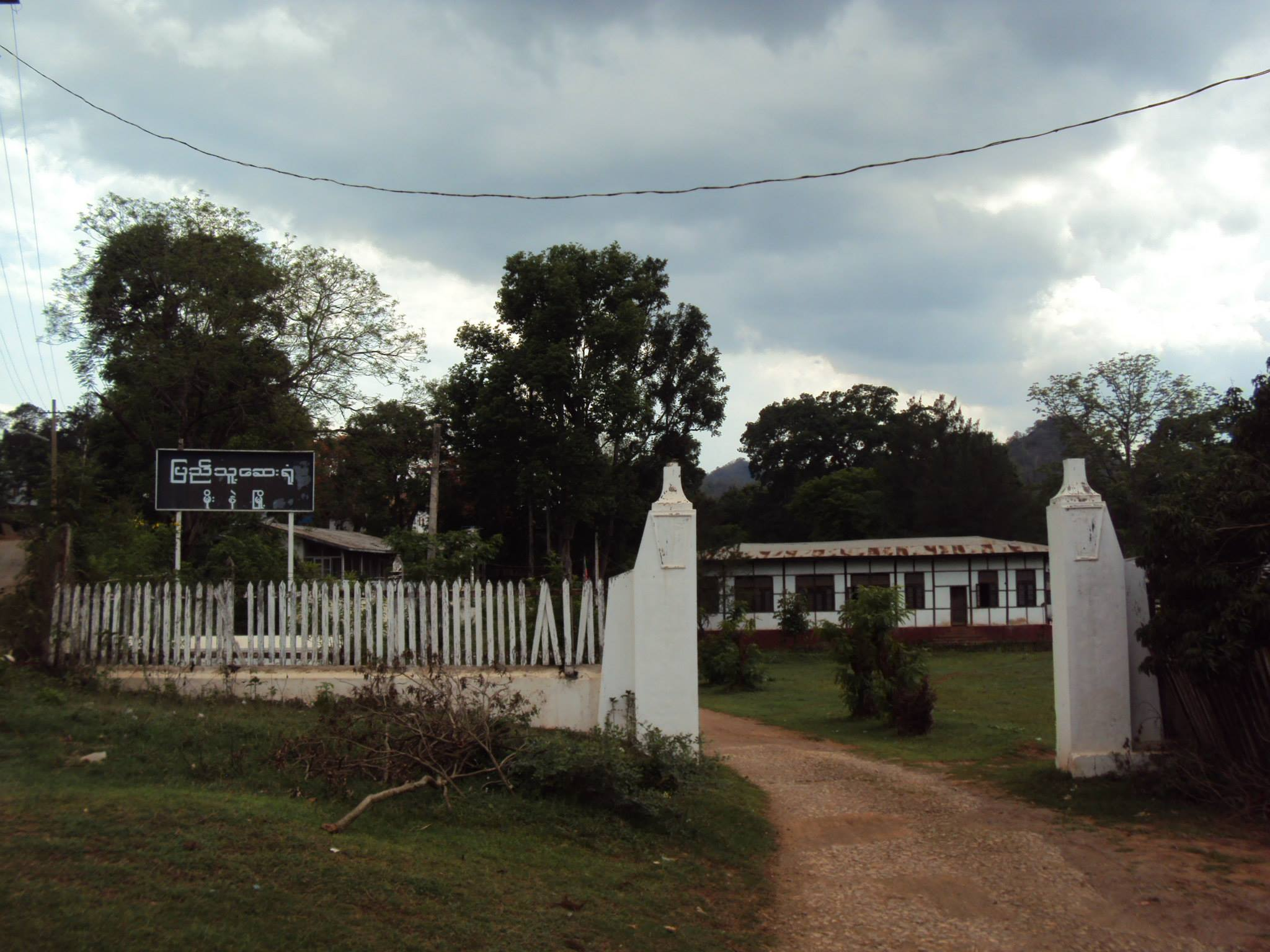
A hospital in Mong Nai

- Mong Mao
- Mong Hsat
- Mong Hpayak
- Mong Ton
- Mong Nai
- Mong Ping
- Mohnyin (former Mongyang State)
- Mogaung (former Mongkawng)
- Momauk
- Mogok
- Momeik

=== Northeast India ===
- Mong Dun Shun Kham or Ahom kingdom – The Mueang (currently the states of Assam and Arunachal Pradesh in North-East India), established by a Tai Prince Sukaphaa in 1228 with 9000 Tai People migrated from Mong Mao called as Ahom by local people, transformed itself into a huge kingdom by the 17th century that withstood the might of the Mughal Empire.

=== Thailand ===
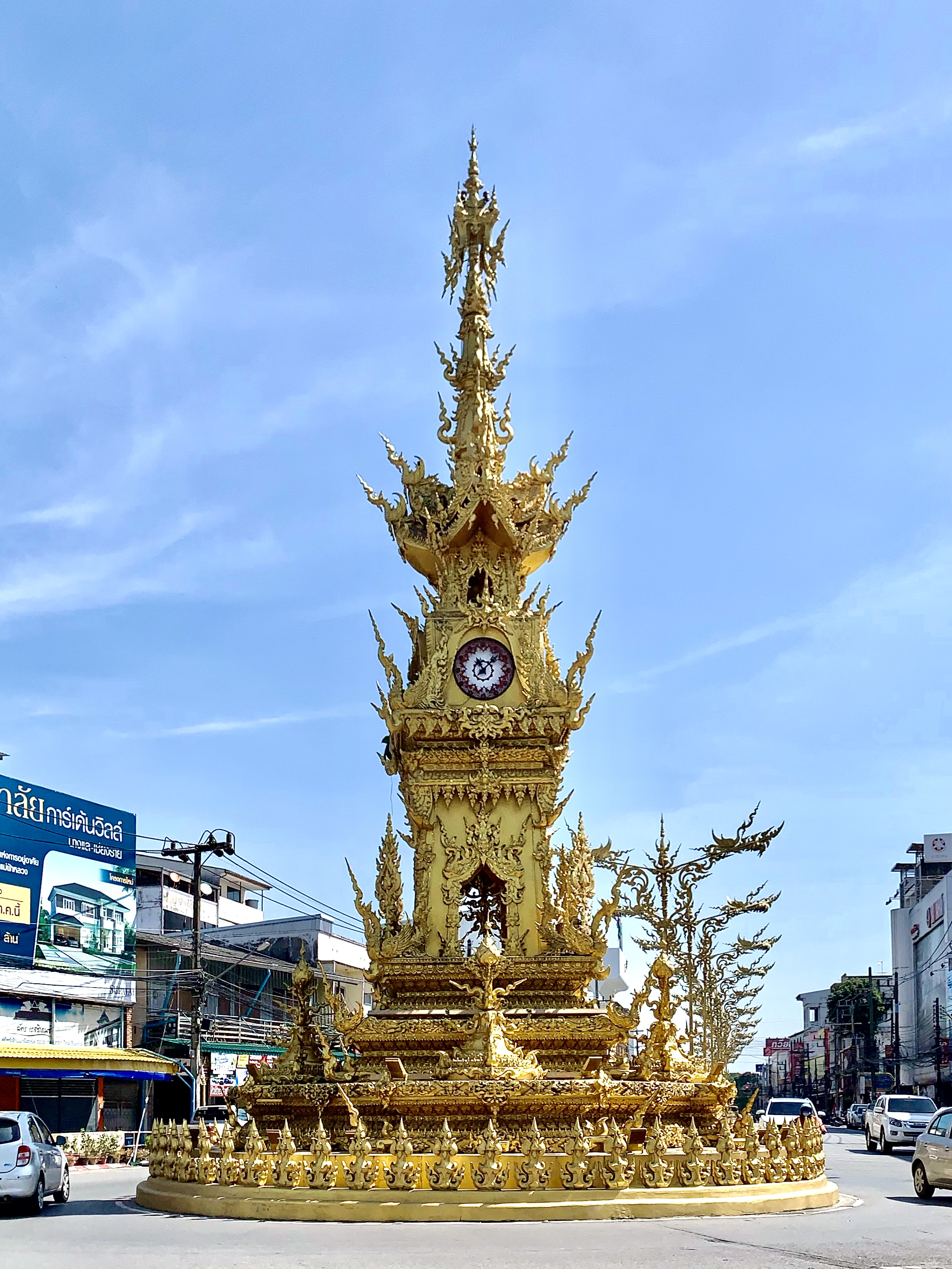
The Mueang Chiang Rai Clock Tower

Thailand is colloquially known as Mueang Thai. After the Thesaphiban reforms of Prince Damrong Rajanubhab, city-states under Siam were organized into monthon (มณฑล, Thai translation of mandala), which was changed to changwat (จังหวัด) in 1916. Mueang still can be found as the term for the capital districts of the provinces (amphoe mueang), as well as for a municipal status equivalent to town (thesaban mueang). In standard Thai, the term for the country of Thailand is ประเทศไทย, rtgs: Prathet Thai.

==== Mueang toponyms ====
Mueang still forms part of the placenames of a few places, notably Don Mueang District, home to Don Mueang International Airport; and in the Royal Thai General System of Transcription Mueang Phatthaya (เมืองพัทยา) for the self-governing municipality of Pattaya.

==== Nakhon mueang ====
Nakhon (นคร) as the word for "city" has been modified to thesaban nakhon (เทศบาลนคร), usually translated as "city municipality". It still forms part of the name of some places.

- Krung Thep Maha Nakhon
- Phra Nakhon Si Ayutthaya
- Nakhon Lampang
- Nakhon Nayok
- Nakhon Ratchasima
- Nakhon Si Thammarat
- Nakhon Thai
- Renu Nakhon

==== Buri mueang ====
Sung Noen District is noted for having been the site of two ancient cities: Mueang Sema and Khorakhapura. Pali púra became Sanskrit puri, hence Thai บุรี, บูรี, (buri) all connoting the same as Thai mueang: city with defensive wall. "Khorakhapura" was nicknamed "Nakhon Raj," which as a portmanteau with Sema, became Nakhon Ratchasima. Though dropped from the name of this mueang, Sanskrit buri persists in the names of others.

- Buriram
- Chonburi
- Sing Buri
- Suphan Buri
- Thonburi

=== Vietnam ===
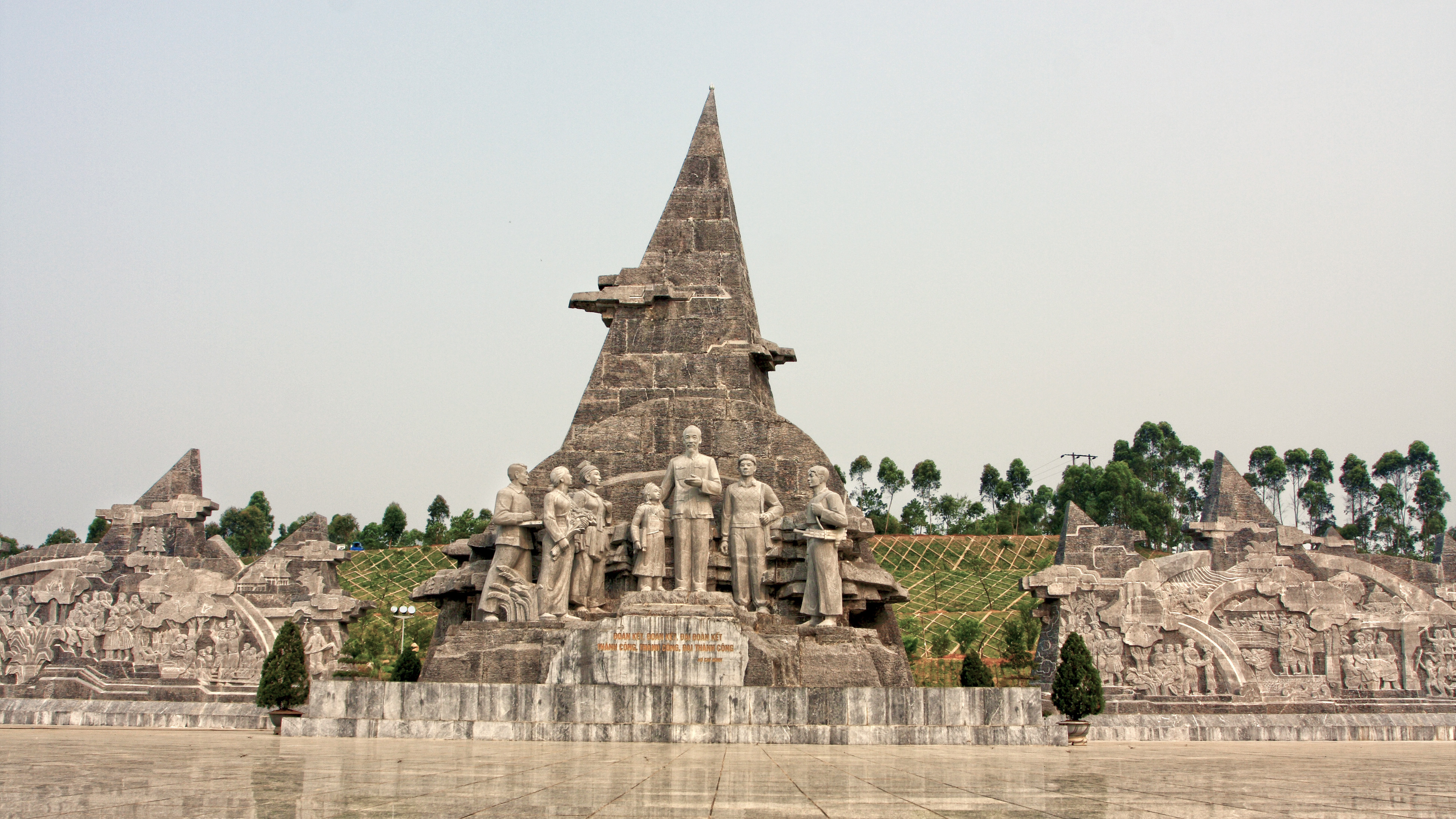
Mường Lay town square

- Muong Cha
- Muong La
- Mường Lay
- Muong Lat
- Muong Khuong
- Muong Nhe
- Muong Te
- Muong Thanh

== Etymology ==
NB: Luo et al. employ /ü/ which may erroneously scan as /ii/.

=== Müang Fai irrigation system ===
Müang Fai is a term reconstructed from Proto-Tai, the common ancestor of all Tai languages. In the Guangxi-Guizhou of Southern China region, the term described what was then a unique type of irrigation engineering for wet-rice cultivation. Müang meaning 'irrigation channel, ditch, canal' and Fai, 'dike, weir, dam.' together referred to gravitational irrigation systems for directing water from streams and rivers. The Proto-Tai language is not directly attested by any surviving texts, but has been reconstructed using the comparative method. This term has Proto-Tai-tone A1. All A1 words are rising tone in modern Thai and Lao, following rules determined for tone origin. Accordingly, the term is:

in modern Thai: เหมืองฝาย
in modern Lao: ເຫມື່ອງຝາຍ. (NB: SEAlang Library's Lao entry omits tonal marking – a typographical error.)

Different linguistic tones give different meanings; scholarship has not established a link between this term and any of the terms which differ in tone.

=== Origin of mueang ===
Mueang conveys many meanings, all having to do with administrative, social, political and religious orientation on wet-rice cultivation. The origin of the word mueang yet remains obscure. In October 2007, The National Library of Laos, in collaboration with the Berlin State Library and the University of Passau, started a project to produce the Digital Library of Lao Manuscripts. Papers presented at the Literary Heritage of Laos Conference, held in Vientiane in 2005, have also been made available. Many of the mss. illuminate the administrative, social, political, and religious demands put on communities in the same watershed area that insured a high degree of cooperation to create and maintain irrigation systems (müang-faai) – which probably was the primary reason for founding mueang.

=== Kham Mueang ===
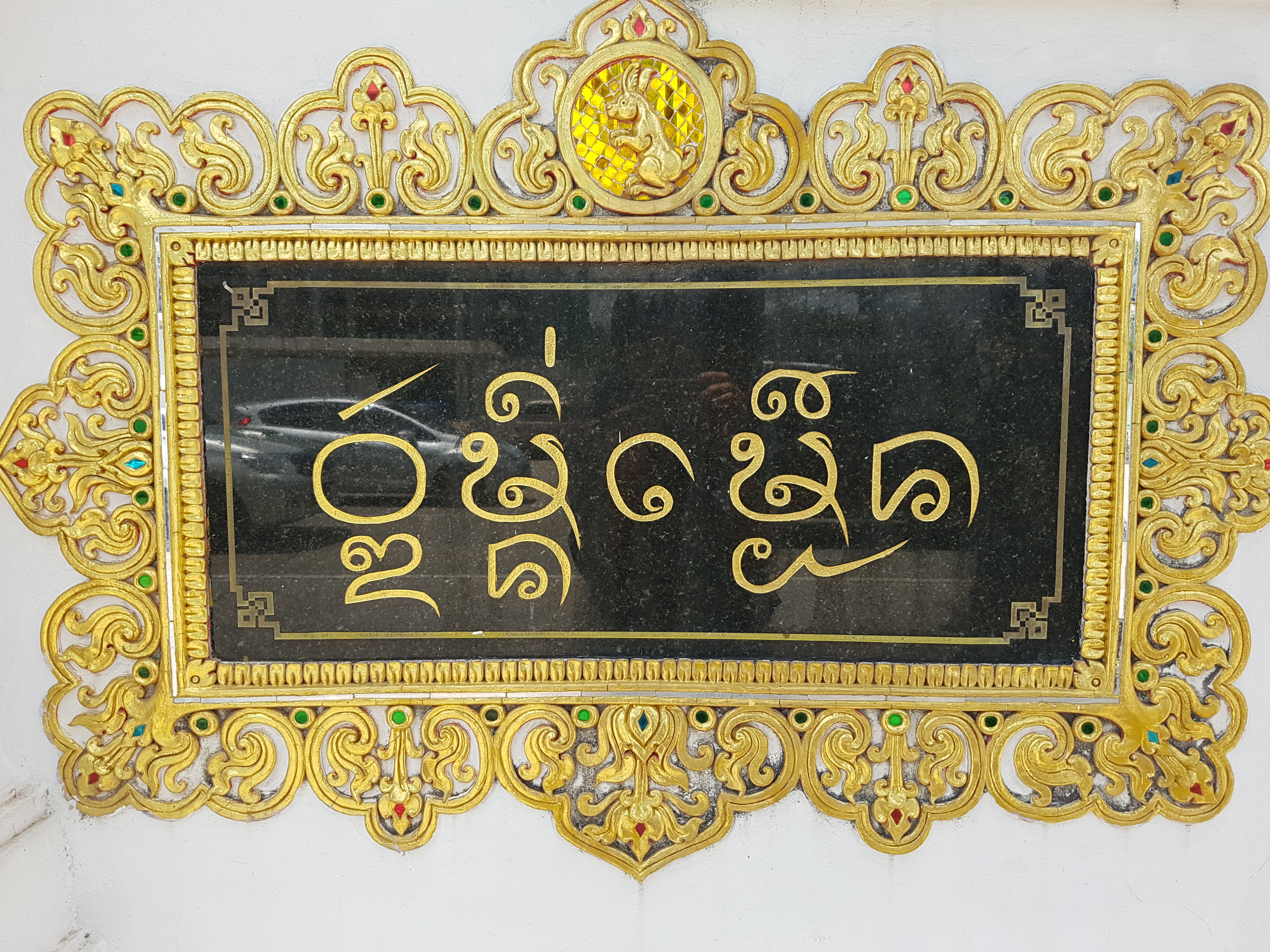
A signage in Tai Tham script, traditionally used for written kham mueang

Kham Mueang (Thai: คำเมือง) is the modern spoken form of the old Northern Thai language that was the language of the kingdom of Lan Na (Million Fields). Central Thai may call northern Thai people and their language Thai Yuan. They call their language Kham Mueang in which Kham means language or word; mueang; town, hence the meaning of "town language," specifically in contrast to those of the many hill tribe peoples in the surrounding mountainous areas.

== See also ==
- Acequia, Spanish term for irrigation system organized like the Müang Fai irrigation system
- Chiang (place name)
- Internal colonialism
- Tusi
- Wiang
