= Sanxian Cave =

Cave in Yunnan, China

- Three Fairies Cave
- Interactive map of Sanxian Cave
- Location: Sanjiaoyan Village, Mengga Town, Mangshi City, Yunnan Province

The Sanxian Cave (Chinese: 三仙洞), or Sanxian Dong, literally meaning 'Three Fairies Cave', is a limestone cave located in Sanjiaoyan Village, Mengga Town, Mangshi City, Yunnan Province. The folklore says that the Cave was named after the three immortals who discovered it and lived in it for a long time.

The Sanxian Cave was formed in the Late Permian, more than 2.7 million years ago. There are stalagmites, stalactites, stone pillars, stone mantles, stone flowers and other landscapes distributed in the cave.
