= Ban Pong, Chiang Rai =

Coordinates: 19.3277°N 99.4997°E

Ban Pong บ้านโป่ง
- Tambon
- Interactive map of Ban Pong
- Country: Thailand
- Province: Chiang Rai
- District: Wiang Pa Pao

Population (2011)
  - Total: 5,239
- Time zone: UTC+7 (ICT)
- TIS 1099: 571103

Ban Pong (Thai: บ้านโป่ง) is tambon (subdistrict) of Wiang Pa Pao District, in Chiang Rai Province, Thailand.

== Administration ==
The subdistrict has a Tambon Administrative Organization (TAO) as its local government, created in 1997.

The subdistrict is divided into seven administrative villages (mubans).

No.	Name	Thai
1.	Ban Fueai Hai	บ้านเฟือยไฮ
2.	Ban Pong Thewi	บ้านโป่งเทวี
3.	Ban San	บ้านสัน
4.	Ban Langka	บ้านลังกา
5.	Ban Pong Thewi	บ้านโป่งเทวี
6.	Ban San To	บ้านสันต๋อ
7.	Ban Huai Hin Lat	บ้านห้วยหินลาด

== History ==
The subdistrict was created by splitting off four administrative villages from Pa Ngio Subdistrict, as announced in the Royal Gazette in 1947.
