= Ban Pong, Phrao =

Coordinates: 19.3732°N 99.1740°E

Ban Pong บ้านโป่ง
- Tambon
- Interactive map of Ban Pong
- Country: Thailand
- Province: Chiang Mai
- District: Phrao

Population (2005)
  - Total: 4,053
- Time zone: UTC+7 (ICT)

Ban Pong (Thai: บ้านโป่ง) is a tambon (subdistrict) of Phrao District, in Chiang Mai Province, Thailand. In 2005, it had a population of 4,053 people. The tambon contains eight villages.
