= San Sali =

San Sali สันสลี
- Tambon
- Country: Thailand
- Province: Chiang Rai
- District: Wiang Pa Pao

Population (2005)
  - Total: 9,051
- Time zone: UTC+7 (ICT)

San Sali (Thai: สันสลี) is a village and tambon (subdistrict) of Wiang Pa Pao District, in Chiang Rai Province, Thailand. In 2005 it had a population of 9,051 people. The tambon contains 13 villages.
