= Khuean Phak =

Khuean Phak เขื่อนผาก
- Tambon
- Interactive map of Khuean Phak
- Coordinates: 19°19′41″N 99°11′25″E
- Country: Thailand
- Province: Chiang Mai
- Amphoe: Phrao

Population (2020)
  - Total: 4,627
- Time zone: UTC+7 (TST)
- Postal code: 50190
- TIS 1099: 501108

Khuean Phak (Thai: เขื่อนผาก) is a tambon (subdistrict) of Phrao District, in Chiang Mai Province, Thailand. In 2020 it had a total population of 4,627 people.

== Administration ==
=== Central administration ===
The tambon is subdivided into 10 administrative villages (muban).

| No. | Name | Thai |
|---|---|---|
| 1. | Ban Phae Phatthana | บ้านแพะพัฒนา |
| 2. | Ban Khuean Phak | บ้านเขื่อนผาก |
| 3. | Ban Huai Bong Nuea | บ้านห้วยบงเหนือ |
| 4. | Ban Huai Bong | บ้านห้วยบง |
| 5. | Ban Sai Mun | บ้านทรายมูล |
| 6. | Ban Sahakon Plaeng Song | บ้านสหกรณ์แปลงสอง |
| 7. | Ban Sai Thong | บ้านทรายทอง |
| 8. | Ban Khwan Pracha | บ้านขวัญประชา |
| 9. | Ban Chai Mongkhon | บ้านไชยมงคล |
| 10. | Ban Muang Luang | บ้านม่วงหลวง |

=== Local administration ===
The whole area of the subdistrict is covered by the subdistrict administrative organization (SAO) Khuean Phak (องค์การบริหารส่วนตำบลเขื่อนผาก).
