= Pa Nai =

Coordinates: 19.4090°N 99.2092°E

Pa Nai ป่าไหน่
- Tambon
- Interactive map of Pa Nai
- Country: Thailand
- Province: Chiang Mai
- District: Phrao

Population (2017)
  - Total: 4,509
- Time zone: UTC+7 (ICT)
- Postal code: 50190
- TIS 1099: 501104

Pa Nai (Thai: ป่าไหน่) is a tambon (subdistrict) of Phrao District, in Chiang Mai Province, Thailand. In 2017, it had a population of 4,509 people.

== Administration ==
=== Central administration ===
The tambon is divided into 10 administrative villages (muban).

No.	Name	Thai
1.	Ban Pa Nai	บ้านป่าไหน่
2.	Ban San Yao	บ้านสันยาว
3.	Ban Lao	บ้านเหล่า
4.	Ban Tin That	บ้านตีนธาตุ
5.	Ban San Klang	บ้านสันกลาง
6.	Ban San Po Thong	บ้านสันปอธง
7.	Ban Muang Thoi	บ้านม่วงถ้อย
8.	Ban Lo Pu Loei	บ้านโล๊ะปูเลย
9.	Ban Muang Kham	บ้านม่วงคำ
10.	Ban San Taphap	บ้านสันตะผาบ

=== Local administration ===
The area of the subdistrict is covered by the subdistrict municipality (thesaban tambon) Pa Nai (เทศบาลตำบลป่าไหน่).
