= Chiang (place name) =

Chiang (Thai: เชียง) is a Sino-Tai loanword, from Middle Chinese 城 d͡ʑiᴇŋ, meaning "fort, castle", by extension, “city”. Chiang is part of the names of certain ancient cities and other places located in an area stretching across Northern Thailand, Northern Laos, NE Burma and Southern China. The most important are:

- Chiang Mai
- Chiang Rai
- Chiang Khong
- Chiang Saen
- Chiang Rung or Chiang Hung, Jinghong in China
- Chiang Tung, Kengtung in Shan State, Burma
- Chiang Thong, Luang Prabang in Laos
- Chiang Kham District
- Chiang Khan District
- Chiang Dao District
- Chiang Khaeng a Lue principality

== See also ==
- Mueang
- Wiang (disambiguation)
