= Mae Pang =

Mae Pang แม่ปั๋ง
- Tambon
- Country: Thailand
- Province: Chiang Mai
- District: Phrao

Population (2005)
  - Total: 6,571
- Time zone: UTC+7 (ICT)

Mae Pang (Thai: แม่ปั๋ง) is a tambon (subdistrict) of Phrao District, in Chiang Mai Province, Thailand. In 2005 it had a population of 6,571 people. The tambon contains 13 villages.
