= Mae Chedi Mai =

Mae Chedi Mai แม่เจดีย์ใหม่
- Tambon
- Country: Thailand
- Province: Chiang Rai
- District: Wiang Pa Pao

Population (2005)
  - Total: 9,744
- Time zone: UTC+7 (ICT)

Mae Chedi Mai (Thai: แม่เจดีย์ใหม่) is a village and tambon (subdistrict) of Wiang Pa Pao District, in Chiang Rai Province, Thailand. In 2005 it had a population of 9,744 people. The tambon contains 14 villages.
