= Long Khot =

Long Khot โหล่งขอด
- Tambon
- Interactive map of Long Khot
- Coordinates: 19°6′37″N 99°10′51″E
- Country: Thailand
- Province: Chiang Mai
- District: Phrao

Population (2014)
  - Total: 4,640
- Time zone: UTC+7 (ICT)
- Postal code: 50190
- TIS 1099: 501111

Long Khot (Thai: โหล่งขอด) is a tambon (subdistrict) of Phrao District, in Chiang Mai Province, Thailand. In 2014 it had a population of 4,640 people.

== Administration ==
=== Central administration ===
The tambon is divided into nine administrative villages (mubans).

No.	Name	Thai
1.	Ban Thung Daeng	บ้านทุ่งแดง
2.	Ban Oa Daeng	บ้านป่าแต้ง
3.	Ban Na Meng	บ้านนาเม็ง
4.	Ban Mae Bon	บ้านแม่บอน
5.	Ban Pa Ha	บ้านป่าห้า
6.	Ban Luang	บ้านหลวง
7.	Ban Mae Sai	บ้านแม่สาย
8.	Ban Hang Tam	บ้านฮ่างต่ำ
9.	Ban Mae Sai Na Lao	บำานแม่สายนาเลา

=== Local administration ===
The area of the subdistrict is covered by the subdistrict administrative organization (SAO) Long Khot (องค์การบริหารส่วนตำบลโหล่งขอด)
