= San Sai, Phrao =

Coordinates: 19.4185°N 99.1882°E

San Sai สันทราย
- Tambon
- Interactive map of San Sai
- Country: Thailand
- Province: Chiang Mai
- District: Phrao

Population (2005)
  - Total: 6,646
- Time zone: UTC+7 (ICT)

San Sai (Thai: สันทราย) is a tambon (subdistrict) of Phrao District, in Chiang Mai Province, Thailand. In 2005 it had a population of 6,646 people. The tambon contains 15 villages.
