= Mueang Chum =

Mueang Chum เมืองชุม
- Tambon
- Country: Thailand
- Province: Chiang Rai
- District: Wiang Chai

Population (2005)
  - Total: 7,274
- Time zone: UTC+7 (ICT)

Mueang Chum (Thai: เมืองชุม) is a village and tambon (subdistrict) of Wiang Chai District, in Chiang Rai Province, Thailand. In 2005, it had a population of 7,274 people. The tambon contains 11 villages.
