= Phrao district =

Phrao พร้าว
- District
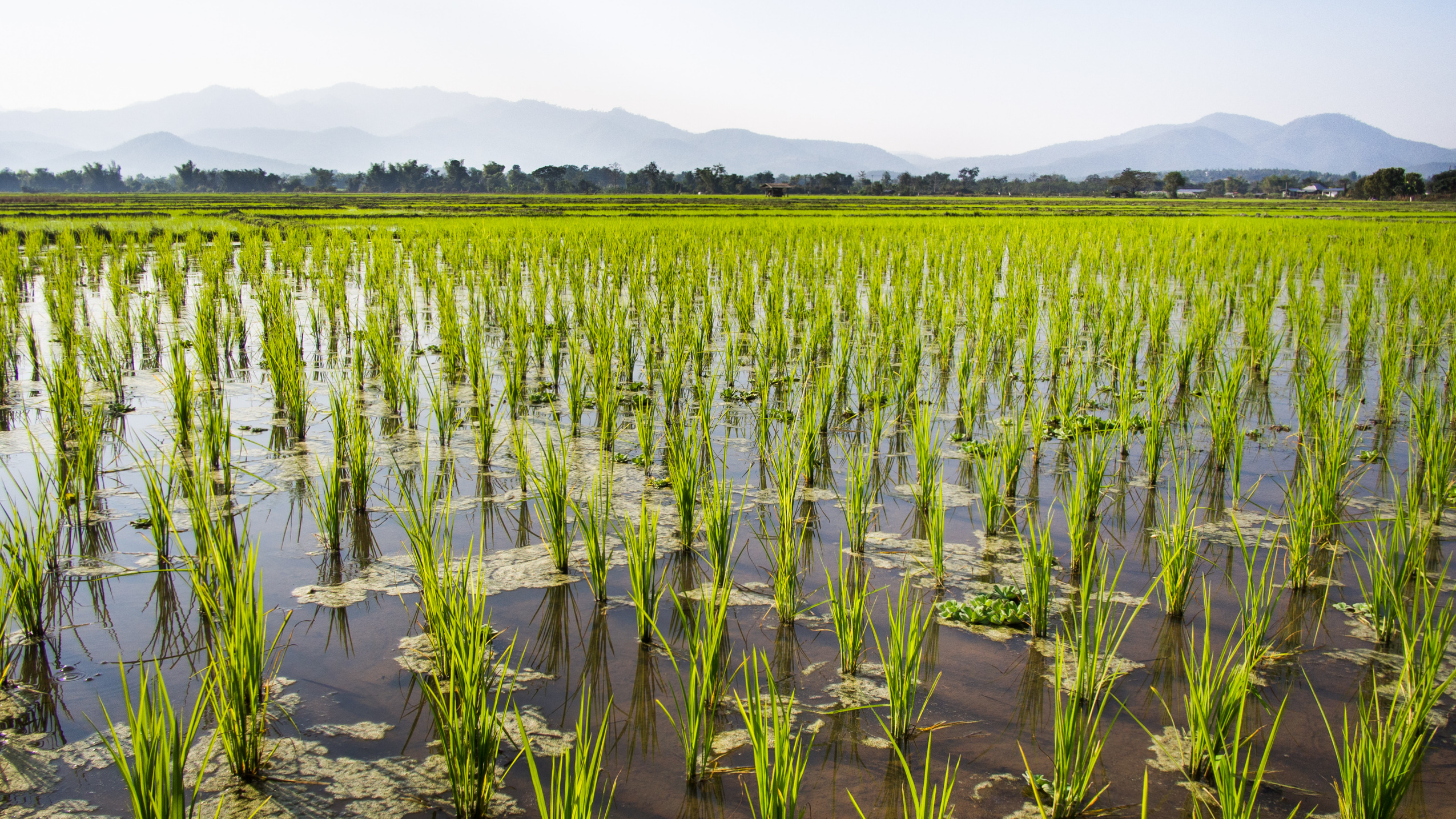
- Rice paddy fields

- District location in Chiang Mai province
- Coordinates: 19°21′57″N 99°12′8″E
- Country: Thailand
- Province: Chiang Mai

Area
  - Total: 1,148.2 km^{2} (443.3 sq mi)

Population (2005)
  - Total: 52,222
  - Density: 45.5/km^{2} (118/sq mi)
- Time zone: UTC+7 (ICT)
- Postal code: 50190
- Geocode: 5011

Phrao (Thai: พร้าว, pronounced [pʰráːw]; Northern Thai: ᨻᩖ᩶ᩣ᩠ᩅ, pronounced [páːw]) is a district (amphoe) in the north-eastern part of Chiang Mai province in northern Thailand. Its major town, Phrao, lies 107 km north-northeast of Chiang Mai. The meaning of Phrao in English is 'coconut'.

== History ==
The name Phrao was given to this city around 1281 by King Mangrai of Lan Na who had been on his way to invade Hariphunchai Kingdom. After this, Mangrai sent his third son, Khrua to rule Phrao. Hereafter, Phrao became one of the important cities of the Lan Na Kingdom.

King Tilokarat, who is considered a god-king of Lan Na, once ruled this city before becoming a king.

== Geography ==
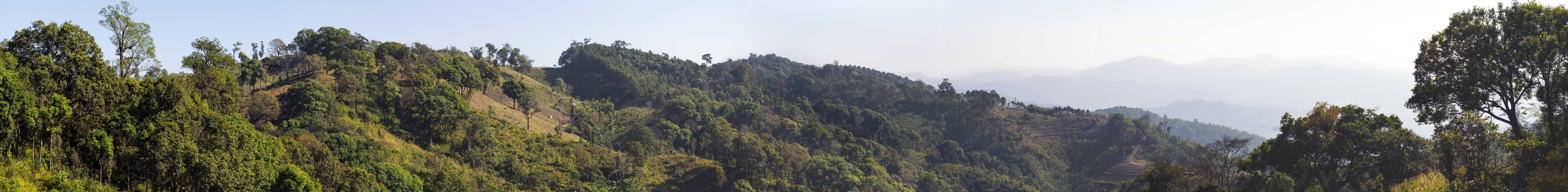
The Khun Tan Range

Neighboring districts are (from the south clockwise) Doi Saket, Mae Taeng, Chiang Dao, Chai Prakan of Chiang Mai Province, Mae Suai, and Wiang Pa Pao of Chiang Rai province.

The Khun Tan Range stretches from north to south along the eastern side of the district.

== Administration ==
The district is divided into 11 sub-districts (tambon), which are further subdivided into 108 villages (muban). Wiang Phrao is a township (thesaban tambon), which covers parts of tambon Wiang and the whole of Thung Luang. There are a further nine tambon administrative organizations (TAO).

No.	Name	Thai name	Villages	Pop.
1.	Wiang	เวียง	6	3,803
2.	Thung Luang	ทุ่งหลวง	6	1,821
3.	Pa Tum	ป่าตุ้ม	12	5,475
4.	Pa Nai	ป่าไหน่	10	4,799
5.	San Sai	สันทราย	15	6,646
6.	Ban Pong	บ้านโป่ง	8	4,053
7.	Nam Phrae	น้ำแพร่	8	3,484
8.	Khuean Phak	เขื่อนผาก	10	5,021
9.	Mae Waen	แม่แวน	11	5,517
10.	Mae Pang	แม่ปั๋ง	13	6,571
11.	Long Khot	โหล่งขอด	9	5,032

== See also ==
- Wat Doi Mae Pang

== Bibliography ==
- The Chiang Mai Chronicle 2nd ed, tr. David K. Wyatt and Aroonrut Wichienkeeo, Chiang Mai: Silkworm Books, 1998, ISBN 978-974-7100-62-4
- Forbes, Andrew, and Henley, David, "The Vale of Phrao" in: Ancient Chiang Mai Volume 3. Chiang Mai: Cognoscenti Books, 2012. ASIN: B006IN1RNW
- Ongsakul, Sarassawadee, History of Lan Na, trans. Chitraporn Tanratanakul, Chian Mai: Silkworm Books, Thai text 2001, English text 2005, ISBN 978-974-9575-84-0
