= Mae Chedi =

Mae Chedi แม่เจดีย์
- Tambon
- Location within Thailand
- Coordinates: 19°11′N 99°31′E
- Country: Thailand
- Province: Chiang Rai
- District: Wiang Pa Pao
- Elevation: 566 m (1,857 ft)

Population (2005)
  - Total: 9,742
- Time zone: UTC+7 (ICT)

Mae Chedi (Thai: แม่เจดีย์) is a village and tambon (subdistrict) of Wiang Pa Pao District, in Chiang Rai Province, Thailand. In 2005 it had a population of 9,742 people. The tambon contains 16 villages.
