= Pha Ngam =

Pha Ngam ผางาม
- Tambon
- Country: Thailand
- Province: Chiang Rai
- District: Wiang Chai

Population (2005)
  - Total: 9,083
- Time zone: UTC+7 (ICT)

Pha Ngam (Thai: ผางาม) is a village and tambon (subdistrict) of Wiang Chai District, in Chiang Rai Province, Thailand. In 2005 it had a population of 9,083 people. The tambon contains 15 villages.
