= Mae Waen =

Coordinates: 19°19′N 99°11′E

Mae Waen แม่แวน
- Tambon
- Interactive map of Mae Waen
- Country: Thailand
- Province: Chiang Mai
- District: Phrao

Population (2005)
  - Total: 5,517
- Time zone: UTC+7 (ICT)

Mae Waen (Thai: แม่แวน) is a tambon (subdistrict) of Phrao District, in Chiang Mai Province, Thailand. In 2005 it had a population of 5,517. The tambon contains 11 villages.
