= Pa Tum =

Pa Tum ป่าตุ้ม
- Tambon
- Interactive map of Pa Tum
- Coordinates: 19°22′03″N 99°13′52″E
- Country: Thailand
- Province: Chiang Mai
- Amphoe: Phrao

Population (2020)
  - Total: 5,228
- Time zone: UTC+7 (TST)
- Postal code: 50190
- TIS 1099: 501103

Pa Tum (Thai: ป่าตุ้ม) is a tambon (subdistrict) of Phrao District, in Chiang Mai Province, Thailand. In 2020 it had a total population of 5,228 people.

== Administration ==
=== Central administration ===
The tambon is subdivided into 12 administrative villages (muban).

No.	Name	Thai
1.	Ban San Kha Mok	บ้านสันคะมอก
2.	Ban Thung Ku	บ้านทุ่งกู่
3.	Ban Ton Rung	บ้านต้นรุง
4.	Ban Ton Kok	บ้านต้นกอก
5.	Ban Thung Ha	บ้านทุ่งห้า
6.	Ban San Thanon	บ้านสันถนน
7.	Ban Hua Yok	บ้านห้วยกุ
8.	Ban Pa Tum Hong	บ้านป่าตุ้มโฮ้ง
9.	Ban Pa Tum Don	บ้านป่าตุ้มดอน
10.	Ban Pang Fang	บ้านปางฟาน
11.	Ban Sahakon Plaeng 5	บ้านสหกรณ์แปลง 5
12.	Ban Doi Tai	บ้านดอยใต้

=== Local administration ===
The whole area of the subdistrict is covered by the subdistrict municipality (Thesaban Tambon) Pa Tum (เทศบาลตำบลป่าตุ้ม).
