= Don Sila =

Don Sila ดอนศิลา
- Tambon
- Country: Thailand
- Province: Chiang Rai
- District: Wiang Chai

Population (2005)
  - Total: 9,920
- Time zone: UTC+7 (ICT)

Don Sila (Thai: ดอนศิลา) is a village and tambon (subdistrict) of Wiang Chai District, in Chiang Rai Province, Thailand. In 2005, it had a population of 9,920 people. The tambon contains 17 villages.
