= Pa Ngio =

- Tambon
- Interactive map of Pa Ngio
- Country: Thailand
- Province: Chiang Rai
- District: Wiang Pa Pao

Population (2005)
  - Total: 9,375
- Time zone: UTC+7 (ICT)

Pa Ngio (Thai: ป่างิ้ว) is a village and tambon (subdistrict) of Wiang Pa Pao District, in Chiang Rai Province, Thailand. In 2005 it had a population of 9,375 people. The tambon contains 16 villages.
