= Mengga =

Mengga Town 勐戛镇
- Town

Tai Nuea transcription(s)
  - Tai Le: ᥛᥫᥒᥰ ᥐᥣ
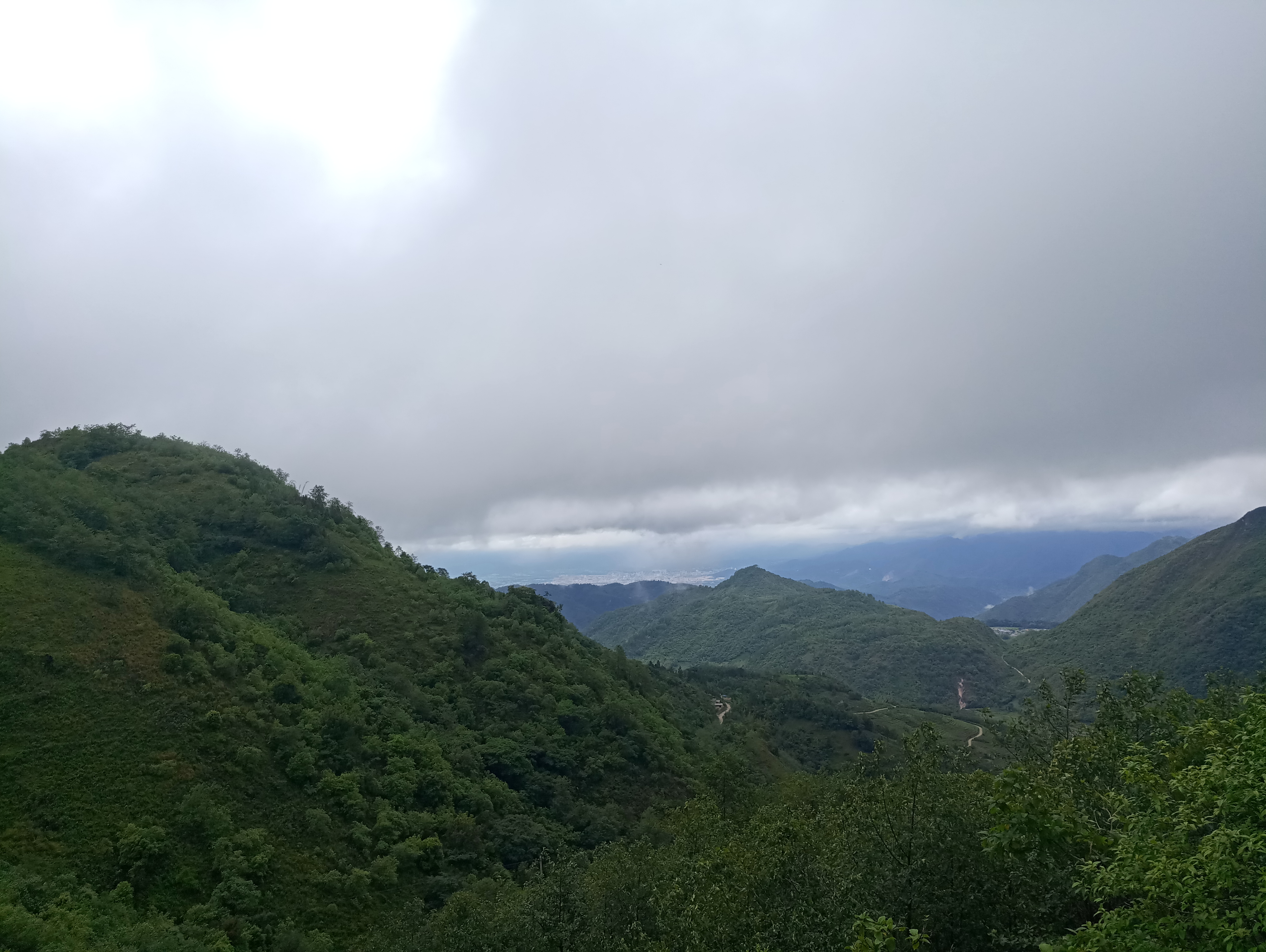
- Mountains in Mengga Town.

- Location of the town region in Mangshi

- Location in Yunnan.
- Coordinates: 24°16′31″N 98°28′02″E
- Country: People's Republic of China
- Province: Yunnan
- Prefecture-level city: Dehong Dai and Jingpo Autonomous Prefecture
- County-level city: Mangshi

Area
  - Total: 356 km^{2} (137 sq mi)
- Elevation: 1,370 m (4,490 ft)

Population (2017)
  - Total: 33,251
  - Density: 93.4/km^{2} (242/sq mi)
- Time zone: UTC+08:00 (China Standard)
- Postal code: 678405
- Area code: 0692

Chinese name
- Traditional Chinese: 勐戛鎮
- Simplified Chinese: 勐戛镇
Transcriptions
Standard Mandarin
- Hanyu Pinyin: Měnggā Zhèn

Mengga (Chinese: 勐戛镇; pinyin: Měnggā Zhèn; Tai Nüa: ᥛᥫᥒᥰ ᥐᥣ) is a town in Mangshi, Yunnan, China. As of the 2017 census it had a population of 33,251 and an area of 356 square kilometres (137 sq mi).

== Etymology ==
In Dai language, "Mengga" means the most precious place.

== Administrative divisions ==
As of December 2015, the town is divided into 9 villages:

- Mengga (勐戛村)
- Mengwen (勐稳村)
- Mengwang (勐旺村)
- Xiangtang (象塘村)
- Mangniuba (芒牛坝村)
- Yangjiachang (杨家场村)
- Sanjiaoyan (三角岩村)
- Daxinzhai (大新寨村)
- Tuanjing (团箐村)

== Geography ==
The Xiaobailong Reservoir (小白龙水库; 'Little White Dragon Reservoir') is a reservoir and the largest body of water in the town.

=== Climate ===
The town is in the south subtropical monsoon climate zone, with an average annual temperature of 14 °C (57 °F) and total annual rainfall of 1,600-millimetre (63 in).

== Natural history ==
There are 23 species of national first-class and second-class protected animals in the town.

== Education ==
- Mengga Middle School
- Mengga Central Primary School

== Economy ==
The local economy is primarily based upon agriculture and animal husbandry.

== Attractions ==
The Sanxian Cave (三仙洞) and Xianfo Cave (仙佛洞) are famous scenic spots in the town.

The Sanxian Temple (三仙寺), Guanyin Temple (观音寺), Earth Mother Temple (地母寺) and Baoshan Temple (宝山寺) are Buddhist temples in the town.

== Transport ==
The County Road Mengxi Road passes across the town.
