= Wiang, Wiang Pa Pao =

Wiang
- Tambon
- Country: Thailand
- Province: Chiang Rai
- District: Wiang Pa Pao

Population (2005)
  - Total: 15,521
- Time zone: UTC+7 (ICT)

Wiang (Thai: เวียง) is a village and tambon (subdistrict) of Wiang Pa Pao District, in Chiang Rai Province, Thailand. In 2005 it had a population of 15,521 people. The tambon contains 12 villages.

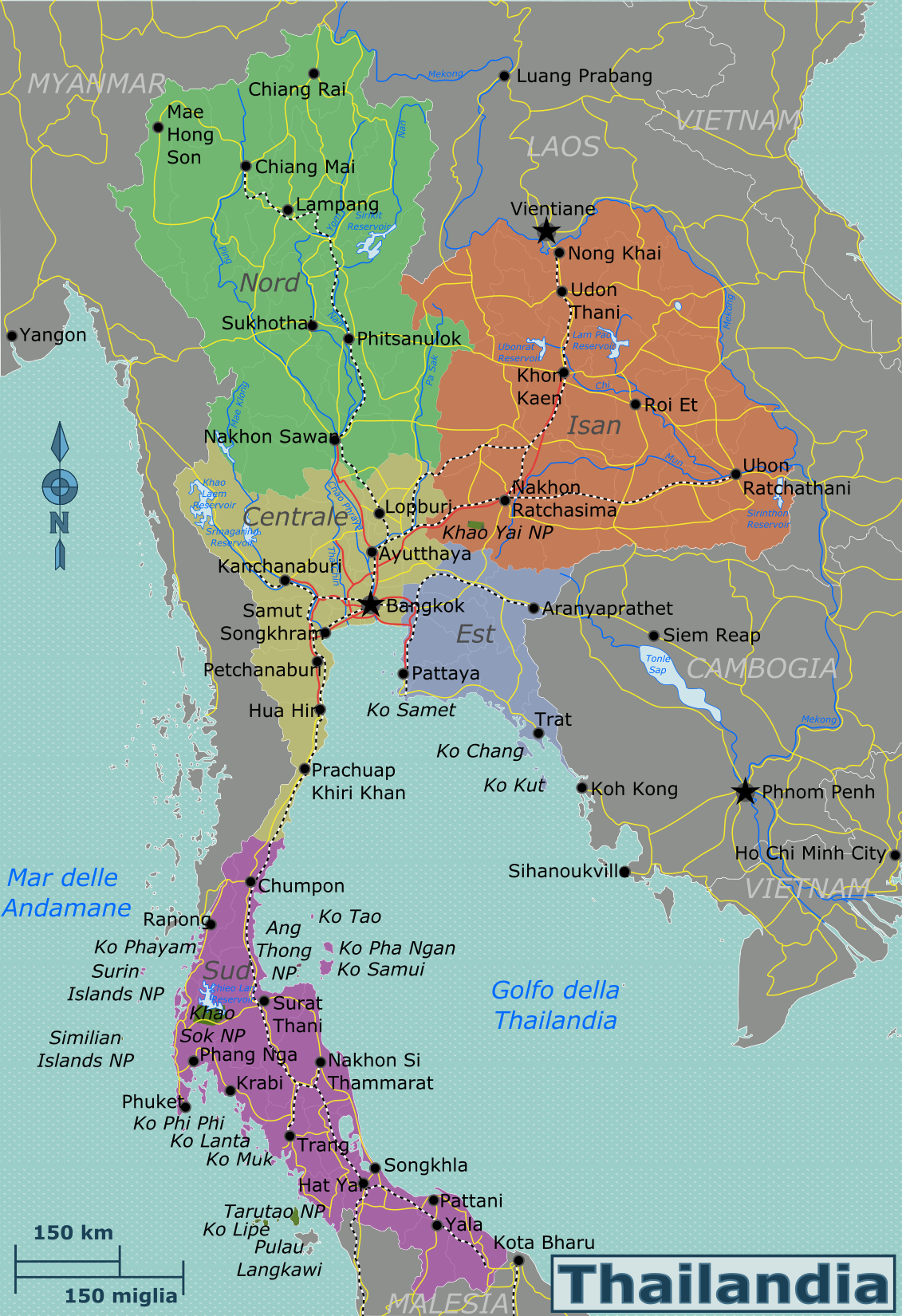
Thailand regions map
