= Nam Phrae, Phrao =

Nam Phrae น้ำแพร่
- Tambon
- Country: Thailand
- Province: Chiang Mai
- District: Phrao

Population (2005)
  - Total: 3,484
- Time zone: UTC+7 (ICT)

Nam Phrae (Thai: น้ำแพร่) is a tambon (subdistrict) of Phrao District, in Chiang Mai Province, Thailand. In 2005 it had a population of 3,484 people. The tambon comprises eight villages.
