= Wiang Kalong =

Coordinates: 19.2332°N 99.5165°E

Wiang Kalong เวียงกาหลง
- Tambon
- Interactive map of Wiang Kalong
- Country: Thailand
- Province: Chiang Rai
- District: Wiang Pa Pao

Population (2005)
  - Total: 9,572
- Time zone: UTC+7 (ICT)

Wiang Kalong (Thai: เวียงกาหลง, RTGS: Wiang Ka Long, pronounced [wīa̯ŋ kāː lǒŋ]) is a muban (village) and tambon (subdistrict) of Wiang Pa Pao District, in Chiang Rai Province, Thailand. In 2005 it had a population of 9,572 people. The tambon contains 15 villages.

== Toponymy ==
The name "Wiang Kalong" literally means "the city where a crow got lost". According to local legend, an albino mother crow once laid five eggs. One day, she flew off in search of food and accidentally entered a lush, fertile city. The place was so abundant that she became lost and never returned. Since then, the area has been known as "Wiang Kalong".
