= Wiang Pa Pao district =

District of Thailand

Wiang Pa Pao เวียงป่าเป้า
- District
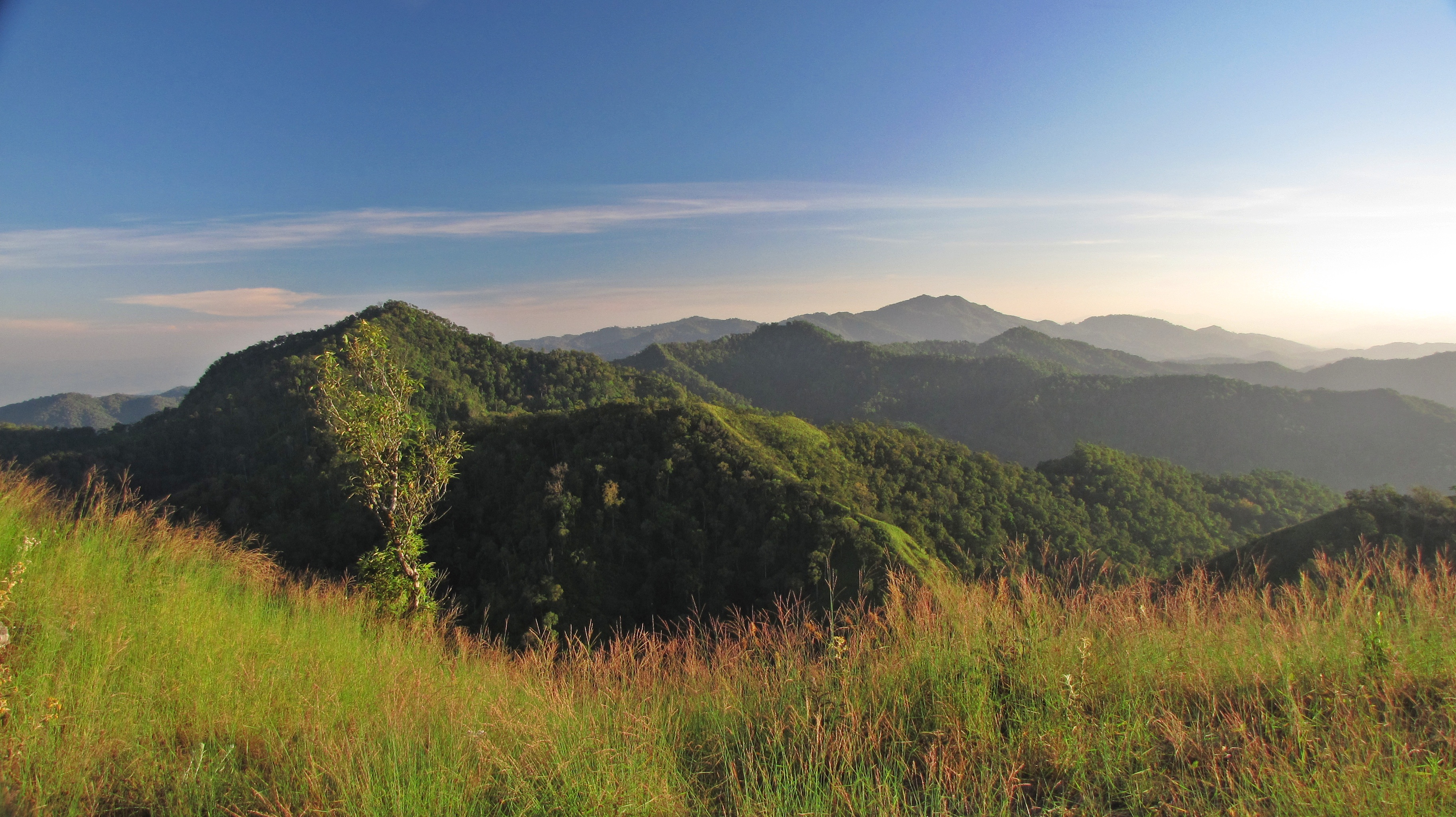
- Khun Chae National Park

- District location in Chiang Rai province
- Coordinates: 19°20′54″N 99°30′24″E
- Country: Thailand
- Province: Chiang Rai
- Seat: Wiang

Area
  - Total: 1,217.0 km^{2} (469.9 sq mi)

Population (2008)
  - Total: 68,198
  - Density: 56.2/km^{2} (146/sq mi)
- Time zone: UTC+7 (ICT)
- Postal code: 57170
- Geocode: 5711

Wiang Pa Pao (Thai: เวียงป่าเป้า; IPA: [wīaŋ pàː pâw]) is the southwesternmost district (amphoe) of Chiang Rai province, northern Thailand.

== Geography ==
Neighboring districts are (from the north clockwise): Mae Suai and Phan of Chiang Rai Province; Wang Nuea and Mueang Pan of Lampang province; Doi Saket and Phrao of Chiang Mai province.

The Khun Tan Range runs along the west side of the district and its highest point, 2,031 m high Doi Mae Tho, is at its southwest end.

== History ==
Wiang Pa Pao was one of the mueang in northern Thailand. In 1905 the District Wiang Pa Pao was merged with Mueang Phong and renamed Mae Suai, while the central area of the old mueang kept the name as the minor district (King Khwaeng) Wiang Pa Pao. In 1907 it was upgraded to a full district.

== Administration ==
The district is divided into seven sub-districts (tambons), which are further subdivided into 92 villages (mubans). There are two sub-district municipalities (thesaban tambons). Wiang Pa Pao covers parts of tambon Wiang, and Mae Khachan covers parts of tambon Mae Chai. There are a further seven tambon administrative organizations (TAO).

No.	Name	Thai	Villages	Pop.
1.	San Sali	สันสลี	13	9,051
2.	Wiang	เวียง	12	15,521
3.	Ban Pong	บ้านโป่ง	7	5,193
4.	Pa Ngio	ป่างิ้ว	16	9,375
5.	Wiang Kalong	เวียงกาหลง	15	9,572
6.	Mae Chedi	แม่เจดีย์	16	9,742
7.	Mae Chedi Mai	แม่เจดีย์ใหม่	14	9,744
