= Wiang Chai district =

District in Chiang Rai, Thailand

Wiang Chai เวียงชัย
- District
- District location in Chiang Rai province
- Coordinates: 19°52′59″N 99°55′59″E
- Country: Thailand
- Province: Chiang Rai
- Seat: Wiang Chai
- Subdistricts: 5
- Mubans: 75
- Districtestablished: 17 June 1974

Area
  - Total: 258.8 km^{2} (99.9 sq mi)

Population (2008)
  - Total: 43,968
  - Density: 169.9/km^{2} (440/sq mi)
- Time zone: UTC+7 (ICT)
- Postal code: 57210
- Geocode: 5702

Wiang Chai (Thai: เวียงชัย, pronounced [wīaŋ tɕʰāj]; Northern Thai: ᩅ᩠ᨿᨦᨩᩱ᩠ᨿ, pronounced [wīaŋ tɕāj]) is a district (amphoe) in the central part of Chiang Rai province, northern Thailand.

== Geography ==
Neighboring districts are (from the west clockwise): Mueang Chiang Rai, Wiang Chiang Rung, Phaya Mengrai, and Thoeng of Chiang Rai Province.

The important water resource is the Kok River.

== History ==
The minor district (king amphoe) was created on 17 June 1974, when the three tambons Wiang Chai, Thung Ko, and Pha Ngam were split off from Mueang Chiang Rai district. It was upgraded to a full district on 25 March 1979.

== Administration ==
The district is divided into five sub-districts (tambons), which are further subdivided into 75 villages (mubans). The township (thesaban tambon) Wiang Chai covers parts of tambons Wiang Chai and Mueang Chum. There are a further five tambon administrative organizations (TAO).

No.	Name	Thai	Villages	Pop.
2.	Wiang Chai	เวียงชัย	20	11,117
3.	Pha Ngam	ผางาม	15	9,083
4.	Wiang Nuea	เวียงเหนือ	12	6,574
6.	Don Sila	ดอนศิลา	17	9,920
8.	Mueang Chum	เมืองชุม	11	7,274

Missing numbers are tambons which now form Wiang Chiang Rung District.
