= Wiang Nuea subdistrict, Lampang =

Wiang Nuea, Mueang Lampang
- Subdistrict
- Country: Thailand
- Province: Lampang
- District: Mueang Lampang District

Population (2005)
  - Total: 12,008
- Time zone: UTC+7 (ICT)

Wiang Nuea, Mueang Lampang (Thai: ?) is a village and tambon (subdistrict) of Mueang Lampang District, in Lampang Province, Thailand. In 2005, it had a population of 12,008 people.
