= Wiang subdistrict, Phrao =

Wiang เวียง
- Tambon
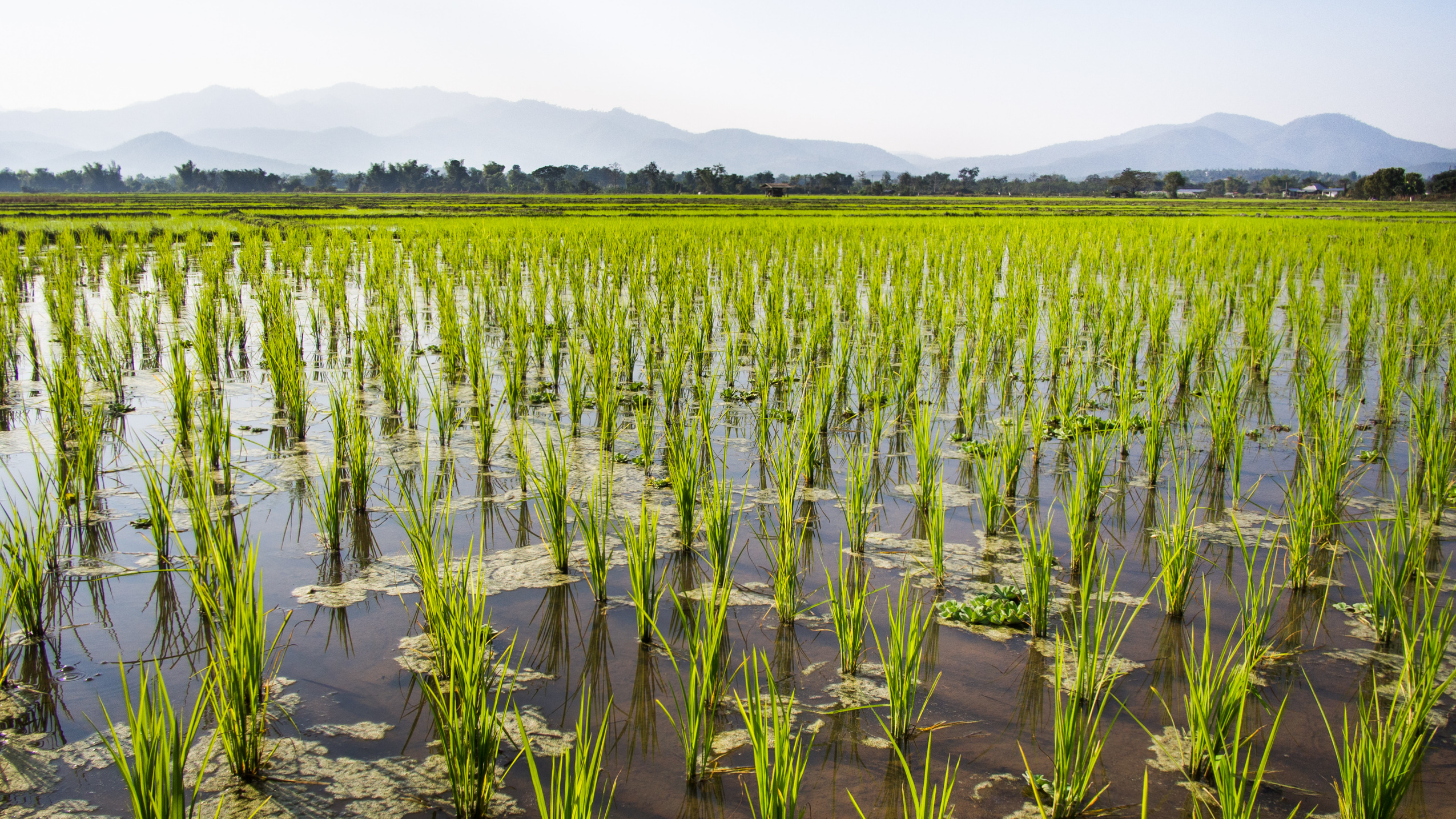
- View towards the mountains west of Phrao, across the rice fields of Wiang subdistrict
- Country: Thailand
- Province: Chiang Mai
- District: Phrao

Population (2005)
  - Total: 3,803
- Time zone: UTC+7 (ICT)

Wiang (Thai: เวียง) is a tambon (subdistrict) of Phrao District, Chiang Mai Province, Thailand. In 2005 it had a population of 3,803 people. The tambon contains six villages.
