= Wiang Nuea, Mae Hong Son =

Wiang Nuea
- Subdistrict
- Interactive map of Wiang Nuea
- Coordinates: 19.5000°N 98.5130°E
- Country: Thailand
- Province: Mae Hong Son
- District: Pai

Population (2005)
  - Total: 3,727
- Time zone: UTC+7 (ICT)

Wiang Nuea, Mae Hong Son (Thai: เวียงเหนือ) is a village and tambon (sub-district) of Pai District, in Mae Hong Son Province, Thailand. In 2005 it had a population of 3,727 people. The tambon contains 10 villages.
