= Wiang Chai subdistrict =

Coordinates: 19°53′N 99°56′E

Wiang Chai เวียงชัย
- Tambon
- Interactive map of Wiang Chai
- Country: Thailand
- Province: Chiang Rai
- District: Wiang Chai

Population (2005)
  - Total: 11,117
- Time zone: UTC+7 (ICT)

Wiang Chai Subdistrict (Thai: เวียงชัย) is a village and tambon (subdistrict) of Wiang Chai District, in Chiang Rai Province, Thailand. In 2005 it had a population of 11,117 people. The tambon contains 20 villages.
