= Mường Lát =

Mường Lát Xã Mường Lát
- Commune
- Mường Lát commune
- Location within Vietnam
- Coordinates: 20°31′49″N 104°36′11″E
- Country: Vietnam
- Region: North Central Coast
- Province: Thanh Hóa
- Time zone: UTC+7 (UTC + 7)

Mường Lát is a commune (xã) of Thanh Hóa Province, Vietnam.
