= Wiang Nuea, Chiang Rai =

Coordinates: 19.9065°N 99.9324°E

Wiang Nuea เวียงเหนือ
- Tambon
- Interactive map of Wiang Nuea
- Country: Thailand
- Province: Chiang Rai
- District: Wiang Chai

Population (2005)
  - Total: 6,574
- Time zone: UTC+7 (ICT)

Wiang Nuea, Chiang Rai (Thai: เวียงเหนือ) is a village and tambon (subdistrict) of Wiang Chai District, in Chiang Rai Province, Thailand. In 2005 it had a population of 6,574 people. The tambon contains 12 villages.
