= Wiang subdistrict, Fang =

Wiang เวียง
- Tambon
- Country: Thailand
- Province: Chiang Mai
- District: Fang

Population (2005)
  - Total: 26,810
- Time zone: UTC+7 (ICT)

Wiang Subdistrict, Fang (Thai: เวียง) is a tambon (subdistrict) of Fang District, in Chiang Mai Province, Thailand. In 2005 it had a population of 26,810 people. The tambon contains 19 villages.

== See also ==
- Fang (town), includes five villages of Wiang
