= List of tambon in Thailand (B) =

This is a list of tambon (sub-districts) in Thailand, beginning with the letter B. This information may change due to border changes or reorganization.

Tambon (sub-district)	ตำบล	Amphoe (district)	อำเภอ	Changwat (province)	จังหวัด	Region
Ba	บะ	Tha Tum	ท่าตูม	Surin	สุรินทร์	Northeast
Ba Hi	บะฮี	Phanna Nikhom	พรรณนานิคม	Sakon Nakhon	สกลนคร	Northeast
Ba Hoi	บาโหย	Saba Yoi (Malay: Sebayu)	สะบ้าย้อย	Songkhla	สงขลา	S
Ba Wa	บะหว้า	Akat Amnuai	อากาศอำนวย	Sakon Nakhon	สกลนคร	Northeast
Ba Wi	บ้าหวี	Hat Samran	หาดสำราญ	Trang	ตรัง	S
Ba Yao	บะยาว	Wang Sam Mo	วังสามหมอ	Udon Thani	อุดรธานี	Northeast
Ba-ngo Sato	บาโงสะโต	Ra-ngae	ระแงะ	Narathiwat	นราธิวาส	S
Ba-ngoi Sinae	บาโงยซิแน	Yaha	ยะหา	Yala	ยะลา	S
Ba-ngoi	บาโงย	Raman (Malay: Reman)	รามัน	Yala	ยะลา	S
Bacho	บาเจาะ	Bacho (Malay: Bahcok)	บาเจาะ	Narathiwat	นราธิวาส	S
Bacho	บาเจาะ	Bannang Sata (Malay: Benang Setar)	บันนังสตา	Yala	ยะลา	S
Bak Dong	บักดอง	Khun Han	ขุนหาญ	Sisaket	ศรีสะเกษ	Northeast
Bakdai	บักได	Phanom Dong Rak	พนมดงรัก	Surin	สุรินทร์	Northeast
Bala	บาละ	Kabang (Malay: Kabae or Kabe)	กาบัง	Yala	ยะลา	S
Balo	บาลอ	Raman (Malay: Reman)	รามัน	Yala	ยะลา	S
Baloi	บาโลย	Yaring (Malay: Jamu)	ยะหริ่ง	Pattani	ปัตตานี	S
Ban Aen	บ้านแอ่น	Doi Tao	ดอยเต่า	Chiang Mai	เชียงใหม่	N
Ban Bak	บ้านบาก	Don Tan	ดอนตาล	Mukdahan	มุกดาหาร	Northeast
Ban Bak	บ้านบาก	Si Somdet	ศรีสมเด็จ	Roi Et	ร้อยเอ็ด	Northeast
Ban Bat	บ้านบาตร	Khet Pom Prap Sattru Phai	ป้อมปราบศัตรูพ่าย	Bangkok	กรุงเทพมหานคร	Central
Ban Bo	บ้านบ่อ	Mueang Samut Sakhon	เมืองสมุทรสาคร	Samut Sakhon	สมุทรสาคร	Central
Ban Boek	บ้านเบิก	Tha Wung	ท่าวุ้ง	Lopburi	ลพบุรี	Central
Ban Bom	บ้านบอม	Mae Tha	แม่ทะ	Lampang	ลำปาง	N
Ban Bua	บ้านบัว	Kaset Sombun	เกษตรสมบูรณ์	Chaiyaphum	ชัยภูมิ	Northeast
Ban Bua	บ้านบัว	Mueang Buriram	เมืองบุรีรัมย์	Buriram	บุรีรัมย์	Northeast
Ban Bueng	บ้านบึง	Ban Bueng	บ้านบึง	Chonburi	ชลบุรี	East
Ban Bueng	บ้านบึง	Ban Rai	บ้านไร่	Uthai Thani	อุทัยธานี	Central
Ban Bueng	บ้านบึง	Ban Kha	บ้านคา	Ratchaburi	ราชบุรี	West
Ban Bung	บ้านบุ่ง	Mueang Phichit	เมืองพิจิตร	Phichit	พิจิตร	Central
Ban Cha-uat	บ้านชะอวด	Chulabhorn	จุฬาภรณ์	Nakhon Si Thammarat	นครศรีธรรมราช	S
Ban Cha	บ้านจ่า	Bang Rachan	บางระจัน	Sing Buri	สิงห์บุรี	Central
Ban Chaeng	บ้านแจ้ง	At Samat	อาจสามารถ	Roi Et	ร้อยเอ็ด	Northeast
Ban Chai	บ้านชัย	Ban Dung	บ้านดุง	Udon Thani	อุดรธานี	Northeast
Ban Chan	บ้านจารย์	Sangkha	สังขะ	Surin	สุรินทร์	Northeast
Ban Chan	บ้านจั่น	Mueang Udon Thani	เมืองอุดรธานี	Udon Thani	อุดรธานี	Northeast
Ban Chan	บ้านจันทน์	Ban Dung	บ้านดุง	Udon Thani	อุดรธานี	Northeast
Ban Chan	บ้านจันทร์	Galyani Vadhana	กัลยาณิวัฒนา	Chiang Mai	เชียงใหม่	N
Ban Chan	บ้านจาน	Phutthaisong	พุทไธสง	Buriram	บุรีรัมย์	Northeast
Ban Chang	บ้านช้าง	Uthai	อุทัย	Phra Nakhon Si Ayutthaya	พระนครศรีอยุธยา	Central
Ban Chang	บ้านช้าง	Song Phi Nong	สองพี่น้อง	Suphan Buri	สุพรรณบุรี	Central
Ban Chang	บ้านฉาง	Ban Chang	บ้านฉาง	Rayong	ระยอง	East
Ban Chang	บ้านฉาง	Mueang Pathum Thani	เมืองปทุมธานี	Pathum Thani	ปทุมธานี	Central
Ban Chang	บ้านช้าง	Mae Taeng	แม่แตง	Chiang Mai	เชียงใหม่	N
Ban Chang	บ้านช้าง	Phanat Nikhom	พนัสนิคม	Chonburi	ชลบุรี	East
Ban Chang Lo	บ้านช่างหล่อ	Khet Bangkok Noi	บางกอกน้อย	Bangkok	กรุงเทพมหานคร	Central
Ban Chi	บ้านชี	Ban Mi	บ้านหมี่	Lopburi	ลพบุรี	Central
Ban Chian	บ้านเชี่ยน	Hankha	หันคา	Chai Nat	ชัยนาท	Central
Ban Chiang	บ้านเจียง	Phakdi Chumphon	ภักดีชุมพล	Chaiyaphum	ชัยภูมิ	Northeast
Ban Chiang	บ้านเชียง	Nong Han	หนองหาน	Udon Thani	อุดรธานี	Northeast
Ban Chit	บ้านจีต	Ku Kaeo	กู่แก้ว	Udon Thani	อุดรธานี	Northeast
Ban Chop	บ้านชบ	Sangkha	สังขะ	Surin	สุรินทร์	Northeast
Ban Chuan	บ้านชวน	Bamnet Narong	บำเหน็จณรงค์	Chaiyaphum	ชัยภูมิ	Northeast
Ban Chung	บ้านชุ้ง	Nakhon Luang	นครหลวง	Phra Nakhon Si Ayutthaya	พระนครศรีอยุธยา	Central
Ban Daen	บ้านแดน	Banphot Phisai	บรรพตพิสัย	Nakhon Sawan	นครสวรรค์	Central
Ban Daeng	บ้านแดง	Phibun Rak	พิบูลย์รักษ์	Udon Thani	อุดรธานี	Northeast
Ban Daeng	บ้านแดง	Trakan Phuet Phon	ตระการพืชผล	Ubon Ratchathani	อุบลราชธานี	Northeast
Ban Dai	บ้านด้าย	Mae Sai	แม่สาย	Chiang Rai	เชียงราย	N
Ban Dan Na Kham	บ้านด่านนาขาม	Mueang Uttaradit	เมืองอุตรดิตถ์	Uttaradit	อุตรดิตถ์	N
Ban Dan	บ้านด่าน	Ban Dan	บ้านด่าน	Buriram	บุรีรัมย์	Northeast
Ban Dan	บ้านด่าน	Mueang Uttaradit	เมืองอุตรดิตถ์	Uttaradit	อุตรดิตถ์	N
Ban Dan	บ้านด่าน	Aranyaprathet	อรัญประเทศ	Sa Kaeo	สระแก้ว	East
Ban Dan	บ้านด่าน	Ban Dan Lan Hoi	บ้านด่านลานหอย	Sukhothai	สุโขทัย	Central
Ban Dara	บ้านดารา	Phichai	พิชัย	Uttaradit	อุตรดิตถ์	N
Ban Don	บ้านดอน	Phu Khiao	ภูเขียว	Chaiyaphum	ชัยภูมิ	Northeast
Ban Don	บ้านดอน	U Thong	อู่ทอง	Suphan Buri	สุพรรณบุรี	Central
Ban Dong	บ้านดง	Mae Mo	แม่เมาะ	Lampang	ลำปาง	N
Ban Dong	บ้านดง	Ubolratana	อุบลรัตน์	Khon Kaen	ขอนแก่น	Northeast
Ban Dong	บ้านดง	Chat Trakan	ชาติตระการ	Phitsanulok	พิษณุโลก	Central
Ban Du	บ้านดู่	At Samat	อาจสามารถ	Roi Et	ร้อยเอ็ด	Northeast
Ban Du	บ้านดู่	Na Pho	นาโพธิ์	Buriram	บุรีรัมย์	Northeast
Ban Du	บ้านดู่	Mueang Chiang Rai	เมืองเชียงราย	Chiang Rai	เชียงราย	N
Ban Duea	บ้านเดื่อ	Kaset Sombun	เกษตรสมบูรณ์	Chaiyaphum	ชัยภูมิ	Northeast
Ban Duea	บ้านเดื่อ	Tha Bo	ท่าบ่อ	Nong Khai	หนองคาย	Northeast
Ban Duea	บ้านเดื่อ	Mueang Nong Khai	เมืองหนองคาย	Nong Khai	หนองคาย	Northeast
Ban Dung	บ้านดุง	Ban Dung	บ้านดุง	Udon Thani	อุดรธานี	Northeast
Ban Fai	บ้านฝาย	Nam Pat	น้ำปาด	Uttaradit	อุตรดิตถ์	N
Ban Fang	บ้านฝาง	Sakhrai	สระใคร	Nong Khai	หนองคาย	Northeast
Ban Fang	บ้านฝาง	Kranuan	กระนวน	Khon Kaen	ขอนแก่น	Northeast
Ban Fang	บ้านฝาง	Ban Fang	บ้านฝาง	Khon Kaen	ขอนแก่น	Northeast
Ban Fang	บ้านฝาง	Kaset Wisai	เกษตรวิสัย	Roi Et	ร้อยเอ็ด	Northeast
Ban Hae	บ้านแห	Mueang Ang Thong	เมืองอ่างทอง	Ang Thong	อ่างทอง	Central
Ban Haeng	บ้านแหง	Ngao	งาว	Lampang	ลำปาง	N
Ban Haet	บ้านแฮด	Ban Haet	บ้านแฮด	Khon Kaen	ขอนแก่น	Northeast
Ban Han	บ้านหัน	Kaset Sombun	เกษตรสมบูรณ์	Chaiyaphum	ชัยภูมิ	Northeast
Ban Han	บ้านหัน	Sikhio	สีคิ้ว	Nakhon Ratchasima	นครราชสีมา	Northeast
Ban Han	บ้านหัน	Non Sila	โนนศิลา	Khon Kaen	ขอนแก่น	Northeast
Ban Han	บ้านหาร	Bang Klam	บางกล่ำ	Songkhla	สงขลา	S
Ban Hat	บ้านหาด	Ban Lat	บ้านลาด	Phetchaburi	เพชรบุรี	West
Ban Hin Ngom	บ้านหินโงม	Sang Khom	สร้างคอม	Udon Thani	อุดรธานี	Northeast
Ban Hip	บ้านหีบ	Uthai	อุทัย	Phra Nakhon Si Ayutthaya	พระนครศรีอยุธยา	Central
Ban Hoi	บ้านหอย	Prachantakham	ประจันตคาม	Prachin Buri	ปราจีนบุรี	East
Ban Hong	บ้านโฮ่ง	Ban Hong	บ้านโฮ่ง	Lamphun	ลำพูน	N
Ban Huat	บ้านหวด	Ngao	งาว	Lampang	ลำปาง	N
Ban It	บ้านอิฐ	Mueang Ang Thong	เมืองอ่างทอง	Ang Thong	อ่างทอง	Central
Ban Kaeng	บ้านแก่ง	Si Satchanalai	ศรีสัชนาลัย	Sukhothai	สุโขทัย	Central
Ban Kaeng	บ้านแก่ง	Mueang Nakhon Sawan	เมืองนครสวรรค์	Nakhon Sawan	นครสวรรค์	Central
Ban Kaeng	บ้านแก้ง	Na Kae	นาแก	Nakhon Phanom	นครพนม	Northeast
Ban Kaeng	บ้านแก่ง	Tron	ตรอน	Uttaradit	อุตรดิตถ์	N
Ban Kaeng	บ้านแก้ง	Mueang Sa Kaeo	เมืองสระแก้ว	Sa Kaeo	สระแก้ว	East
Ban Kaeng	บ้านแก้ง	Chaloem Phra Kiat	เฉลิมพระเกียรติ	Saraburi	สระบุรี	Central
Ban Kaeng	บ้านแก้ง	Kaeng Khro	แก้งคร้อ	Chaiyaphum	ชัยภูมิ	Northeast
Ban Kaeng	บ้านแก้ง	Phu Khiao	ภูเขียว	Chaiyaphum	ชัยภูมิ	Northeast
Ban Kaeng	บ้านแก้ง	Don Tan	ดอนตาล	Mukdahan	มุกดาหาร	Northeast
Ban Kao	บ้านเก่า	Mueang Kanchanaburi	เมืองกาญจนบุรี	Kanchanaburi	กาญจนบุรี	West
Ban Kao	บ้านเก่า	Nong Chang	หนองฉาง	Uthai Thani	อุทัยธานี	Central
Ban Kao	บ้านเก่า	Dan Khun Thot	ด่านขุนทด	Nakhon Ratchasima	นครราชสีมา	Northeast
Ban Kao	บ้านเก่า	Phan Thong	พานทอง	Chonburi	ชลบุรี	East
Ban Kat	บ้านกาศ	Sung Men	สูงเม่น	Phrae	แพร่	N
Ban Kat	บ้านกาด	Mae Wang	แม่วาง	Chiang Mai	เชียงใหม่	N
Ban Kat	บ้านกาศ	Mae Sariang	แม่สะเรียง	Mae Hong Son	แม่ฮ่องสอน	N
Ban Kha	บ้านข่า	Si Songkhram	ศรีสงคราม	Nakhon Phanom	นครพนม	Northeast
Ban Kha	บ้านคา	Ban Kha	บ้านคา	Ratchaburi	ราชบุรี	West
Ban Kha	บ้านค่า	Mueang Lampang	เมืองลำปาง	Lampang	ลำปาง	N
Ban Khae	บ้านแค	Phak Hai	ผักไห่	Phra Nakhon Si Ayutthaya	พระนครศรีอยุธยา	Central
Ban Khaem	บ้านแขม	Phibun Mangsahan	พิบูลมังสาหาร	Ubon Ratchathani	อุบลราชธานี	Northeast
Ban Kha	บ้านค่าย	Ban Khai	บ้านค่าย	Rayong	ระยอง	East
Ban Khai	บ้านค่าย	Mueang Chaiyaphum	เมืองชัยภูมิ	Chaiyaphum	ชัยภูมิ	Northeast
Ban Kham	บ้านขาม	Chatturat	จัตุรัส	Chaiyaphum	ชัยภูมิ	Northeast
Ban Kham	บ้านขาม	Mueang Nongbua Lamphu	เมืองหนองบัวลำภู	Nong Bua Lamphu	หนองบัวลำภู	Northeast
Ban Kham	บ้านขาม	Nam Phong	น้ำพอง	Khon Kaen	ขอนแก่น	Northeast
Ban Khao	บ้านขาว	Ranot (Malay: Renut)	ระโนด	Songkhla	สงขลา	S
Ban Khao	บ้านขาว	Mueang Udon Thani	เมืองอุดรธานี	Udon Thani	อุดรธานี	Northeast
Ban Khlang	บ้านคลัง	Bang Ban	บางบาล	Phra Nakhon Si Ayutthaya	พระนครศรีอยุธยา	Central
Ban Khlong Suan	บ้านคลองสวน	Phra Samut Chedi	พระสมุทรเจดีย์	Samut Prakan	สมุทรปราการ	Central
Ban Khlong	บ้านคลอง	Mueang Phitsanulok	เมืองพิษณุโลก	Phitsanulok	พิษณุโลก	Central
Ban Kho	บ้านขอ	Mueang Pan	เมืองปาน	Lampang	ลำปาง	N
Ban Kho	บ้านค้อ	Mueang Khon Kaen	เมืองขอนแก่น	Khon Kaen	ขอนแก่น	Northeast
Ban Kho	บ้านค้อ	Ban Phue	บ้านผือ	Udon Thani	อุดรธานี	Northeast
Ban Kho	บ้านค้อ	Non Sang	โนนสัง	Nong Bua Lamphu	หนองบัวลำภู	Northeast
Ban Kho	บ้านค้อ	Phon Sawan	โพนสวรรค์	Nakhon Phanom	นครพนม	Northeast
Ban Kho	บ้านค้อ	Khamcha-i	คำชะอี	Mukdahan	มุกดาหาร	Northeast
Ban Khoi	บ้านข่อย	Mueang Lopburi	เมืองลพบุรี	Lopburi	ลพบุรี	Central
Ban Khok	บ้านโคก	Khok Pho Chai	โคกโพธิ์ไชย	Khon Kaen	ขอนแก่น	Northeast
Ban Khok	บ้านโคก	Suwannakhuha	สุวรรณคูหา	Nong Bua Lamphu	หนองบัวลำภู	Northeast
Ban Khok	บ้านโคก	Ban Khok	บ้านโคก	Uttaradit	อุตรดิตถ์	N
Ban Khok	บ้านโคก	Nong Na Kham	หนองนาคำ	Khon Kaen	ขอนแก่น	Northeast
Ban Khok	บ้านโคก	Mueang Mukdahan	เมืองมุกดาหาร	Mukdahan	มุกดาหาร	Northeast
Ban Khok	บ้านโคก	Sang Khom	สร้างคอม	Udon Thani	อุดรธานี	Northeast
Ban Khok	บ้านโคก	Mueang Phetchabun	เมืองเพชรบูรณ์	Phetchabun	เพชรบูรณ์	Central
Ban Khon	บ้านโคน	Phichai	พิชัย	Uttaradit	อุตรดิตถ์	N
Ban Khong	บ้านโข้ง	U Thong	อู่ทอง	Suphan Buri	สุพรรณบุรี	Central
Ban Khong	บ้านฆ้อง	Photharam	โพธาราม	Ratchaburi	ราชบุรี	West
Ban Khot	บ้านโขด	Mueang Chonburi	เมืองชลบุรี	Chonburi	ชลบุรี	East
Ban Khrua	บ้านครัว	Ban Mo	บ้านหมอ	Saraburi	สระบุรี	Central
Ban Khu	บ้านคู	Na Pho	นาโพธิ์	Buriram	บุรีรัมย์	Northeast
Ban Khuan Mut	บ้านควนมุด	Chulabhorn	จุฬาภรณ์	Nakhon Si Thammarat	นครศรีธรรมราช	S
Ban Khuan	บ้านควน	Mueang Satun (Malay: Mambang)	เมืองสตูล	Satun	สตูล	S
Ban Khuan	บ้านควน	Mueang Trang	เมืองตรัง	Trang	ตรัง	S
Ban Khuan	บ้านควน	Lang Suan	หลังสวน	Chumphon	ชุมพร	S
Ban Khueang	บ้านเขือง	Chiang Khwan	เชียงขวัญ	Roi Et	ร้อยเอ็ด	Northeast
Ban Khwang	บ้านขวาง	Maha Rat	มหาราช	Phra Nakhon Si Ayutthaya	พระนครศรีอยุธยา	Central
Ban Khwao	บ้านเขว้า	Ban Khwao	บ้านเขว้า	Chaiyaphum	ชัยภูมิ	Northeast
Ban Kio	บ้านกิ่ว	Mae Tha	แม่ทะ	Lampang	ลำปาง	N
Ban Klang	บ้านกลาง	San Pa Tong	สันป่าตอง	Chiang Mai	เชียงใหม่	N
Ban Klang	บ้านกลาง	Song	สอง	Phrae	แพร่	N
Ban Klang	บ้านกลาง	Mueang Lamphun	เมืองลำพูน	Lamphun	ลำพูน	N
Ban Klang	บ้านกลาง	Lom Sak	หล่มสัก	Phetchabun	เพชรบูรณ์	Central
Ban Klang	บ้านกลาง	Mueang Pathum Thani	เมืองปทุมธานี	Pathum Thani	ปทุมธานี	Central
Ban Klang	บ้านกลาง	Wang Thong	วังทอง	Phitsanulok	พิษณุโลก	Central
Ban Klang	บ้านกลาง	Mueang Nakhon Phanom	เมืองนครพนม	Nakhon Phanom	นครพนม	Northeast
Ban Klang	บ้านกลาง	Ao Luek	อ่าวลึก	Krabi	กระบี่	S
Ban Klang	บ้านกลาง	Panare (Malay: Penarik)	ปะนาเระ	Pattani	ปัตตานี	S
Ban Klap	บ้านกลับ	Nong Don	หนองโดน	Saraburi	สระบุรี	Central
Ban Kluai	บ้านกล้วย	Mueang Chai Nat	เมืองชัยนาท	Chai Nat	ชัยนาท	Central
Ban Kluai	บ้านกล้วย	Chon Daen	ชนแดน	Phetchabun	เพชรบูรณ์	Central
Ban Kluai	บ้านกล้วย	Ban Mi	บ้านหมี่	Lopburi	ลพบุรี	Central
Ban Kluai	บ้านกล้วย	Mueang Sukhothai	เมืองสุโขทัย	Sukhothai	สุโขทัย	Central
Ban Klueng	บ้านกลึง	Bang Sai	บางไทร	Phra Nakhon Si Ayutthaya	พระนครศรีอยุธยา	Central
Ban Ko	บ้านเกาะ	Mueang Samut Sakhon	เมืองสมุทรสาคร	Samut Sakhon	สมุทรสาคร	Central
Ban Ko	บ้านเกาะ	Phra Nakhon Si Ayutthaya	พระนครศรีอยุธยา	Phra Nakhon Si Ayutthaya	พระนครศรีอยุธยา	Central
Ban Ko	บ้านเกาะ	Bang Sai	บางไทร	Phra Nakhon Si Ayutthaya	พระนครศรีอยุธยา	Central
Ban Ko	บ้านเกาะ	Phrom Khiri	พรหมคีรี	Nakhon Si Thammarat	นครศรีธรรมราช	S
Ban Ko	บ้านเกาะ	Mueang Uttaradit	เมืองอุตรดิตถ์	Uttaradit	อุตรดิตถ์	N
Ban Ko	บ้านเกาะ	Mueang Nakhon Ratchasima	เมืองนครราชสีมา	Nakhon Ratchasima	นครราชสีมา	Northeast
Ban Kok	บ้านกอก	Chatturat	จัตุรัส	Chaiyaphum	ชัยภูมิ	Northeast
Ban Kok	บ้านกอก	Khueang Nai	เขื่องใน	Ubon Ratchathani	อุบลราชธานี	Northeast
Ban Kong	บ้านกง	Nong Ruea	หนองเรือ	Khon Kaen	ขอนแก่น	Northeast
Ban Kong	บ้านก้อง	Na Yung	นายูง	Udon Thani	อุดรธานี	Northeast
Ban Krachaeng	บ้านกระแชง	Mueang Pathum Thani	เมืองปทุมธานี	Pathum Thani	ปทุมธานี	Central
Ban Krang	บ้านกร่าง	Si Prachan	ศรีประจันต์	Suphan Buri	สุพรรณบุรี	Central
Ban Krang	บ้านกร่าง	Mueang Phitsanulok	เมืองพิษณุโลก	Phitsanulok	พิษณุโลก	Central
Ban Krang	บ้านกร่าง	Kong Krailat	กงไกรลาศ	Sukhothai	สุโขทัย	Central
Ban Kro	บ้านกรด	Bang Pa-in	บางปะอิน	Phra Nakhon Si Ayutthaya	พระนครศรีอยุธยา	Central
Ban Kruat	บ้านกรวด	Ban Kruat	บ้านกรวด	Buriram	บุรีรัมย์	Northeast
Ban Ku	บ้านกู่	Yang Sisurat	ยางสีสุราช	Maha Sarakham	มหาสารคาม	Northeast
Ban Kum	บ้านกุ่ม	Bang Ban	บางบาล	Phra Nakhon Si Ayutthaya	พระนครศรีอยุธยา	Central
Ban Kum	บ้านกุ่ม	Song Phi Nong	สองพี่น้อง	Suphan Buri	สุพรรณบุรี	Central
Ban Kum	บ้านกุ่ม	Mueang Phetchaburi	เมืองเพชรบุรี	Phetchaburi	เพชรบุรี	West
Ban Kwang	บ้านกวาง	Sung Men	สูงเม่น	Phrae	แพร่	N
Ban Laem	บ้านแหลม	Ban Laem	บ้านแหลม	Phetchaburi	เพชรบุรี	West
Ban Laem	บ้านแหลม	Bang Pla Ma	บางปลาม้า	Suphan Buri	สุพรรณบุรี	Central
Ban Laeng	บ้านแลง	Mueang Rayong	เมืองระยอง	Rayong	ระยอง	East
Ban Laeng	บ้านแลง	Mueang Lampang	เมืองลำปาง	Lampang	ลำปาง	N
Ban Lam	บ้านลำ	Wihan Daeng	วิหารแดง	Saraburi	สระบุรี	Central
Ban Lamnao	บ้านลำนาว	Bang Khan	บางขัน	Nakhon Si Thammarat	นครศรีธรรมราช	S
Ban Lan	บ้านลาน	Ban Phai	บ้านไผ่	Khon Kaen	ขอนแก่น	Northeast
Ban Lao	บ้านเล่า	Mueang Chaiyaphum	เมืองชัยภูมิ	Chaiyaphum	ชัยภูมิ	Northeast
Ban Lao	บ้านเหล่า	Charoen Sin	เจริญศิลป์	Sakon Nakhon	สกลนคร	Northeast
Ban Lao	บ้านเหล่า	Phon Na Kaeo	โพนนาแก้ว	Sakon Nakhon	สกลนคร	Northeast
Ban Lao	บ้านเหล่า	Ban Fang	บ้านฝาง	Khon Kaen	ขอนแก่น	Northeast
Ban Lao	บ้านเหล่า	Mae Chai	แม่ใจ	Phayao	พะเยา	N
Ban Lao	บ้านเหล่า	Sung Men	สูงเม่น	Phrae	แพร่	N
Ban Lao	บ้านเหล่า	Khamcha-i	คำชะอี	Mukdahan	มุกดาหาร	Northeast
Ban Lao	บ้านเหล่า	Phen	เพ็ญ	Udon Thani	อุดรธานี	Northeast
Ban Lat	บ้านลาด	Ban Lat	บ้านลาด	Phetchaburi	เพชรบุรี	West
Ban Len	บ้านเลน	Bang Pa-in	บางปะอิน	Phra Nakhon Si Ayutthaya	พระนครศรีอยุธยา	Central
Ban Luang	บ้านหลวง	Chom Thong	จอมทอง	Chiang Mai	เชียงใหม่	N
Ban Luang	บ้านหลวง	Don Phut	ดอนพุด	Saraburi	สระบุรี	Central
Ban Luang	บ้านหลวง	Don Tum	ดอนตูม	Nakhon Pathom	นครปฐม	Central
Ban Luang	บ้านหลวง	Mae Ai	แม่อาย	Chiang Mai	เชียงใหม่	N
Ban Lueak	บ้านเลือก	Photharam	โพธาราม	Ratchaburi	ราชบุรี	West
Ban Lueam	บ้านเลื่อม	Mueang Udon Thani	เมืองอุดรธานี	Udon Thani	อุดรธานี	Northeast
Ban Lueam	บ้านเหลื่อม	Ban Lueam	บ้านเหลื่อม	Nakhon Ratchasima	นครราชสีมา	Northeast
Ban Lum	บ้านหลุม	Mueang Sukhothai	เมืองสุโขทัย	Sukhothai	สุโขทัย	Central
Ban Ma	บ้านม้า	Bang Sai	บางไทร	Phra Nakhon Si Ayutthaya	พระนครศรีอยุธยา	Central
Ban Mae	บ้านแม	San Pa Tong	สันป่าตอง	Chiang Mai	เชียงใหม่	N
Ban Maet	บ้านแมด	Buntharik	บุณฑริก	Ubon Ratchathani	อุบลราชธานี	Northeast
Ban Mai	บ้านใหม่	Mueang Nakhon Ratchasima	เมืองนครราชสีมา	Nakhon Ratchasima	นครราชสีมา	Northeast
Ban Mai	บ้านใหม่	Mueang Phayao	เมืองพะเยา	Phayao	พะเยา	N
Ban Mai	บ้านใหม่	Phra Nakhon Si Ayutthaya	พระนครศรีอยุธยา	Phra Nakhon Si Ayutthaya	พระนครศรีอยุธยา	Central
Ban Mai	บ้านใหม่	Sam Phran	สามพราน	Nakhon Pathom	นครปฐม	Central
Ban Mai	บ้านใหม่	Ban Phraek	บ้านแพรก	Phra Nakhon Si Ayutthaya	พระนครศรีอยุธยา	Central
Ban Mai	บ้านใหม่	Mueang Pathum Thani	เมืองปทุมธานี	Pathum Thani	ปทุมธานี	Central
Ban Mai	บ้านใหม่	Mueang Chachoengsao	เมืองฉะเชิงเทรา	Chachoengsao	ฉะเชิงเทรา	East
Ban Mai	บ้านใหม่	Pak Kret	ปากเกร็ด	Nonthaburi	นนทบุรี	Central
Ban Mai	บ้านใหม่	Ranot (Malay: Renut)	ระโนด	Songkhla	สงขลา	S
Ban Mai	บ้านใหม่	Bang Yai	บางใหญ่	Nonthaburi	นนทบุรี	Central
Ban Mai	บ้านใหม่	Pak Phanang	ปากพนัง	Nakhon Si Thammarat	นครศรีธรรมราช	S
Ban Mai	บ้านใหม่	Khon Buri	ครบุรี	Nakhon Ratchasima	นครราชสีมา	Northeast
Ban Mai	บ้านใหม่	Nong Bun Mak	หนองบุญมาก	Nakhon Ratchasima	นครราชสีมา	Northeast
Ban Mai	บ้านใหม่	Si Chomphu	สีชมพู	Khon Kaen	ขอนแก่น	Northeast
Ban Mai	บ้านใหม่	Tha Muang	ท่าม่วง	Kanchanaburi	กาญจนบุรี	West
Ban Mai	บ้านใหม่	Maha Rat	มหาราช	Phra Nakhon Si Ayutthaya	พระนครศรีอยุธยา	Central
Ban Mai Chai Mongkhon	บ้านใหม่ไชยมงคล	Thung Saliam	ทุ่งเสลี่ยม	Sukhothai	สุโขทัย	Central
Ban Mai Khlong Khian	บ้านใหม่คลองเคียน	Ban Rai	บ้านไร่	Uthai Thani	อุทัยธานี	Central
Ban Mai Nong Sai	บ้านใหม่หนองไทร	Aranyaprathet	อรัญประเทศ	Sa Kaeo	สระแก้ว	East
Ban Mai Samakkhi	บ้านใหม่สามัคคี	Chai Badan	ชัยบาดาล	Lopburi	ลพบุรี	Central
Ban Mai Suk Kasem	บ้านใหม่สุขเกษม	Kong Krailat	กงไกรลาศ	Sukhothai	สุโขทัย	Central
Ban Makluea	บ้านมะเกลือ	Mueang Nakhon Sawan	เมืองนครสวรรค์	Nakhon Sawan	นครสวรรค์	Central
Ban Mang	บ้านมาง	Chiang Muan	เชียงม่วน	Phayao	พะเยา	N
Ban Meng	บ้านเม็ง	Nong Ruea	หนองเรือ	Khon Kaen	ขอนแก่น	Northeast
Ban Mi	บ้านหมี่	Ban Mi	บ้านหมี่	Lopburi	ลพบุรี	Central
Ban Mo	บ้านหมอ	Ban Mo	บ้านหมอ	Saraburi	สระบุรี	Central
Ban Mo	บ้านหม้อ	Mueang Phetchaburi	เมืองเพชรบุรี	Phetchaburi	เพชรบุรี	West
Ban Mo	บ้านหม้อ	Si Chiang Mai	ศรีเชียงใหม่	Nong Khai	หนองคาย	Northeast
Ban Mo	บ้านหม้อ	Phrom Buri	พรหมบุรี	Sing Buri	สิงห์บุรี	Central
Ban Mo	บ้านหม้อ	Phichai	พิชัย	Uttaradit	อุตรดิตถ์	N
Ban Muang	บ้านม่วง	Sangkhom	สังคม	Nong Khai	หนองคาย	Northeast
Ban Muang	บ้านม่วง	Ban Pong	บ้านโป่ง	Ratchaburi	ราชบุรี	West
Ban Muang	บ้านม่วง	Ban Dung	บ้านดุง	Udon Thani	อุดรธานี	Northeast
Ban Mung	บ้านมุง	Noen Maprang	เนินมะปราง	Phitsanulok	พิษณุโลก	Central
Ban Na	บ้านนา	Chana (Malay: Chenok)	จะนะ	Songkhla	สงขลา	S
Ban Na	บ้านนา	Ban Na Doem	บ้านนาเดิม	Surat Thani	สุราษฎร์ธานี	S
Ban Na	บ้านนา	Ban Na	บ้านนา	Nakhon Nayok	นครนายก	Central
Ban Na	บ้านนา	Wachirabarami	วชิรบารมี	Phichit	พิจิตร	Central
Ban Na	บ้านนา	Mueang Chumphon	เมืองชุมพร	Chumphon	ชุมพร	S
Ban Na	บ้านนา	Srinagarindra	ศรีนครินทร์	Phatthalung	พัทลุง	S
Ban Na	บ้านนา	Si Samrong	ศรีสำโรง	Sukhothai	สุโขทัย	Central
Ban Na	บ้านนา	Kapoe	กะเปอร์	Ranong	ระนอง	S
Ban Na	บ้านนา	Sam Ngao	สามเงา	Tak	ตาก	West
Ban Na	บ้านนา	Palian	ปะเหลียน	Trang	ตรัง	S
Ban Na	บ้านนา	Klaeng	แกลง	Rayong	ระยอง	East
Ban Na	บ้านนา	Kabin Buri	กบินทร์บุรี	Prachin Buri	ปราจีนบุรี	East
Ban Na	บ้านนา	Maha Rat	มหาราช	Phra Nakhon Si Ayutthaya	พระนครศรีอยุธยา	Central
Ban Nai Dong	บ้านในดง	Tha Yang	ท่ายาง	Phetchaburi	เพชรบุรี	West
Ban Nam Bo	บ้านน้ำบ่อ	Panare (Malay: Penarik)	ปะนาเระ	Pattani	ปัตตานี	S
Ban Nam Phu	บ้านน้ำพุ	Khiri Mat	คีรีมาศ	Sukhothai	สุโขทัย	Central
Ban Ngio	บ้านงิ้ว	Sam Khok	สามโคก	Pathum Thani	ปทุมธานี	Central
Ban Nikhom	บ้านนิคม	Bang Khan	บางขัน	Nakhon Si Thammarat	นครศรีธรรมราช	S
Ban Noen	บ้านเนิน	Lom Kao	หล่มเก่า	Phetchabun	เพชรบูรณ์	Central
Ban Noen	บ้านเนิน	Chian Yai	เชียรใหญ่	Nakhon Si Thammarat	นครศรีธรรมราช	S
Ban Noi	บ้านน้อย	Pho Thale	โพทะเล	Phichit	พิจิตร	Central
Ban Noi Sum Khilek	บ้านน้อยซุ้มขี้เหล็ก	Noen Maprang	เนินมะปราง	Phitsanulok	พิษณุโลก	Central
Ban Nok	บ้านนอก	Panare (Malay: Penarik)	ปะนาเระ	Pattani	ปัตตานี	S
Ban Non	บ้านโนน	Sam Sung	ซำสูง	Khon Kaen	ขอนแก่น	Northeast
Ban Not	บ้านโหนด	Saba Yoi (Malay: Sebayu)	สะบ้าย้อย	Songkhla	สงขลา	S
Ban Nuea	บ้านเหนือ	Mueang Kanchanaburi	เมืองกาญจนบุรี	Kanchanaburi	กาญจนบุรี	West
Ban Nun	บ้านหนุน	Song	สอง	Phrae	แพร่	N
Ban On	บ้านอ้อน	Ngao	งาว	Lampang	ลำปาง	N
Ban Pa	บ้านป่า	Kaeng Khoi	แก่งคอย	Saraburi	สระบุรี	Central
Ban Pa	บ้านป่า	Mueang Phitsanulok	เมืองพิษณุโลก	Phitsanulok	พิษณุโลก	Central
Ban Pae	บ้านแปะ	Chom Thong	จอมทอง	Chiang Mai	เชียงใหม่	N
Ban Paen	บ้านแป้น	Mueang Lamphun	เมืองลำพูน	Lamphun	ลำพูน	N
Ban Paeng	บ้านแป้ง	Bang Pa-in	บางปะอิน	Phra Nakhon Si Ayutthaya	พระนครศรีอยุธยา	Central
Ban Paeng	บ้านแป้ง	Bang Sai	บางไทร	Phra Nakhon Si Ayutthaya	พระนครศรีอยุธยา	Central
Ban Paeng	บ้านแป้ง	Phrom Buri	พรหมบุรี	Sing Buri	สิงห์บุรี	Central
Ban Pao	บ้านเป้า	Mueang Lampang	เมืองลำปาง	Lampang	ลำปาง	N
Ban Pao	บ้านเป้า	Kaset Sombun	เกษตรสมบูรณ์	Chaiyaphum	ชัยภูมิ	Northeast
Ban Pao	บ้านเป้า	Nong Sung	หนองสูง	Mukdahan	มุกดาหาร	Northeast
Ban Pao	บ้านเป้า	Phutthaisong	พุทไธสง	Buriram	บุรีรัมย์	Northeast
Ban Pao	บ้านเป้า	Mae Taeng	แม่แตง	Chiang Mai	เชียงใหม่	N
Ban Pathum	บ้านปทุม	Sam Khok	สามโคก	Pathum Thani	ปทุมธานี	Central
Ban Pet	บ้านเป็ด	Mueang Khon Kaen	เมืองขอนแก่น	Khon Kaen	ขอนแก่น	Northeast
Ban Phae	บ้านแพ	Khu Mueang	คูเมือง	Buriram	บุรีรัมย์	Northeast
Ban Phaen	บ้านแพน	Sena	เสนา	Phra Nakhon Si Ayutthaya	พระนครศรีอยุธยา	Central
Ban Phaeng	บ้านแพง	Ban Phaeng	บ้านแพง	Nakhon Phanom	นครพนม	Northeast
Ban Phaeo	บ้านแพ้ว	Ban Phaeo	บ้านแพ้ว	Samut Sakhon	สมุทรสาคร	Central
Ban Phai	บ้านไผ่	Ban Phai	บ้านไผ่	Khon Kaen	ขอนแก่น	Northeast
Ban Phan Thom	บ้านพานถม	Khet Phra Nakhon	พระนคร	Bangkok	กรุงเทพมหานคร	Central
Ban Phet	บ้านเพชร	Bamnet Narong	บำเหน็จณรงค์	Chaiyaphum	ชัยภูมิ	Northeast
Ban Phet	บ้านเพชร	Phu Khiao	ภูเขียว	Chaiyaphum	ชัยภูมิ	Northeast
Ban Phlap	บ้านพลับ	Bang Pa-in	บางปะอิน	Phra Nakhon Si Ayutthaya	พระนครศรีอยุธยา	Central
Ban Phluang	บ้านพลวง	Prasat	ปราสาท	Surin	สุรินทร์	Northeast
Ban Pho	บ้านโพ	Bang Pa-in	บางปะอิน	Phra Nakhon Si Ayutthaya	พระนครศรีอยุธยา	Central
Ban Pho	บ้านโพธิ์	Sena	เสนา	Phra Nakhon Si Ayutthaya	พระนครศรีอยุธยา	Central
Ban Pho	บ้านโพธิ์	Mueang Nakhon Ratchasima	เมืองนครราชสีมา	Nakhon Ratchasima	นครราชสีมา	Northeast
Ban Pho	บ้านโพธิ์	Ban Pho	บ้านโพธิ์	Chachoengsao	ฉะเชิงเทรา	East
Ban Pho	บ้านโพธิ์	Phon Phisai	โพนพิสัย	Nong Khai	หนองคาย	Northeast
Ban Pho	บ้านโพธิ์	Mueang Trang	เมืองตรัง	Trang	ตรัง	S
Ban Phoem	บ้านเพิ่ม	Pha Khao	ผาขาว	Loei	เลย	Northeast
Ban Phoeng	บ้านเพิง	Pak Phanang	ปากพนัง	Nakhon Si Thammarat	นครศรีธรรมราช	S
Ban Phot	บ้านโภชน์	Nong Phai	หนองไผ่	Phetchabun	เพชรบูรณ์	Central
Ban Phra	บ้านพระ	Mueang Prachinburi	เมืองปราจีนบุรี	Prachin Buri	ปราจีนบุรี	East
Ban Phraek	บ้านแพรก	Ban Phraek	บ้านแพรก	Phra Nakhon Si Ayutthaya	พระนครศรีอยุธยา	Central
Ban Phran	บ้านพราน	Sawaeng Ha	แสวงหา	Ang Thong	อ่างทอง	Central
Ban Phrao	บ้านพร้าว	Nakhon Thai	นครไทย	Phitsanulok	พิษณุโลก	Central
Ban Phrao	บ้านพร้าว	Ban Na	บ้านนา	Nakhon Nayok	นครนายก	Central
Ban Phrao	บ้านพร้าว	Pa Phayom	ป่าพะยอม	Phatthalung	พัทลุง	S
Ban Phrao	บ้านพร้าว	Mueang Nongbua Lamphu	เมืองหนองบัวลำภู	Nong Bua Lamphu	หนองบัวลำภู	Northeast
Ban Phrik	บ้านพริก	Ban Na	บ้านนา	Nakhon Nayok	นครนายก	Central
Ban Phru	บ้านพรุ	Hat Yai	หาดใหญ่	Songkhla	สงขลา	S
Ban Phue	บ้านผือ	Ban Phue	บ้านผือ	Udon Thani	อุดรธานี	Northeast
Ban Phue	บ้านผือ	Phon Phisai	โพนพิสัย	Nong Khai	หนองคาย	Northeast
Ban Phue	บ้านผือ	Chom Phra	จอมพระ	Surin	สุรินทร์	Northeast
Ban Phueng	บ้านผึ้ง	Mueang Nakhon Phanom	เมืองนครพนม	Nakhon Phanom	นครพนม	Northeast
Ban Pin	บ้านปิน	Long	ลอง	Phrae	แพร่	N
Ban Pin	บ้านปิน	Dok Khamtai	ดอกคำใต้	Phayao	พะเยา	N
Ban Pom	บ้านป้อม	Phra Nakhon Si Ayutthaya	พระนครศรีอยุธยา	Phra Nakhon Si Ayutthaya	พระนครศรีอยุธยา	Central
Ban Pom	บ้านป้อม	Khiri Mat	คีรีมาศ	Sukhothai	สุโขทัย	Central
Ban Pong	บ้านปง	Hang Dong	หางดง	Chiang Mai	เชียงใหม่	N
Ban Pong	บ้านปง	Sung Men	สูงเม่น	Phrae	แพร่	N
Ban Pong	บ้านโป่ง	Ban Pong	บ้านโป่ง	Ratchaburi	ราชบุรี	West
Ban Pong	บ้านโป่ง	Ngao	งาว	Lampang	ลำปาง	N
Ban Pong	บ้านโป่ง	Wiang Pa Pao	เวียงป่าเป้า	Chiang Rai	เชียงราย	N
Ban Pong	บ้านโป่ง	Phrao	พร้าว	Chiang Mai	เชียงใหม่	N
Ban Praeng	บ้านแปรง	Dan Khun Thot	ด่านขุนทด	Nakhon Ratchasima	นครราชสีมา	Northeast
Ban Pramot	บ้านปราโมทย์	Bang Khonthi	บางคนที	Samut Songkhram	สมุทรสงคราม	Central
Ban Prang	บ้านปรางค์	Khong	คง	Nakhon Ratchasima	นครราชสีมา	Northeast
Ban Prok	บ้านปรก	Mueang Samut Songkhram	เมืองสมุทรสงคราม	Samut Songkhram	สมุทรสงคราม	Central
Ban Prong	บ้านโปร่ง	Si That	ศรีธาตุ	Udon Thani	อุดรธานี	Northeast
Ban Prong	บ้านโปร่ง	Nong Don	หนองโดน	Saraburi	สระบุรี	Central
Ban Prue	บ้านปรือ	Krasang	กระสัง	Buriram	บุรีรัมย์	Northeast
Ban Puang	บ้านปวง	Thung Hua Chang	ทุ่งหัวช้าง	Lamphun	ลำพูน	N
Ban Puek	บ้านปึก	Mueang Chonburi	เมืองชลบุรี	Chonburi	ชลบุรี	East
Ban Ra Kat	บ้านระกาศ	Bang Bo	บางบ่อ	Samut Prakan	สมุทรปราการ	Central
Ban Rae	บ้านแร่	Khwao Sinarin	เขวาสินรินทร์	Surin	สุรินทร์	Northeast
Ban Rae	บ้านแหร	Than To	ธารโต	Yala	ยะลา	S
Ban Rai	บ้านไร่	Si Samrong	ศรีสำโรง	Sukhothai	สุโขทัย	Central
Ban Rai	บ้านไร่	Damnoen Saduak	ดำเนินสะดวก	Ratchaburi	ราชบุรี	West
Ban Rai	บ้านไร่	Ban Rai	บ้านไร่	Uthai Thani	อุทัยธานี	Central
Ban Rai	บ้านไร่	Bang Krathum	บางกระทุ่ม	Phitsanulok	พิษณุโลก	Central
Ban Rai	บ้านไร่	Lom Sak	หล่มสัก	Phetchabun	เพชรบูรณ์	Central
Ban Rai	บ้านไร่	Mueang Ratchaburi	เมืองราชบุรี	Ratchaburi	ราชบุรี	West
Ban Rai	บ้านไร่	Thep Sathit	เทพสถิต	Chaiyaphum	ชัยภูมิ	Northeast
Ban Rai	บ้านไร่	Lat Yao	ลาดยาว	Nakhon Sawan	นครสวรรค์	Central
Ban Ram	บ้านราม	Hua Sai	หัวไทร	Nakhon Si Thammarat	นครศรีธรรมราช	S
Ban Rat	บ้านราษฎร์	Soeng Sang	เสิงสาง	Nakhon Ratchasima	นครราชสีมา	Northeast
Ban Ri	บ้านรี	Mueang Ang Thong	เมืองอ่างทอง	Ang Thong	อ่างทอง	Central
Ban Rom	บ้านร่อม	Tha Ruea	ท่าเรือ	Phra Nakhon Si Ayutthaya	พระนครศรีอยุธยา	Central
Ban Rong	บ้านร้อง	Ngao	งาว	Lampang	ลำปาง	N
Ban Ruea	บ้านเรือ	Phu Wiang	ภูเวียง	Khon Kaen	ขอนแก่น	Northeast
Ban Ruean	บ้านเรือน	Pa Sang	ป่าซาง	Lamphun	ลำพูน	N
Ban Run	บ้านรุน	Phra Nakhon Si Ayutthaya	พระนครศรีอยุธยา	Phra Nakhon Si Ayutthaya	พระนครศรีอยุธยา	Central
Ban Sa	บ้านสระ	Sam Chuk	สามชุก	Suphan Buri	สุพรรณบุรี	Central
Ban Sa	บ้านสา	Chae Hom	แจ้ห่ม	Lampang	ลำปาง	N
Ban Sadet	บ้านเสด็จ	Mueang Lampang	เมืองลำปาง	Lampang	ลำปาง	N
Ban Sadet	บ้านเสด็จ	Khian Sa	เคียนซา	Surat Thani	สุราษฎร์ธานี	S
Ban Saeo	บ้านแซว	Chiang Saen	เชียงแสน	Chiang Rai	เชียงราย	N
Ban Sahakon	บ้านสหกรณ์	Mae On	แม่ออน	Chiang Mai	เชียงใหม่	N
Ban Sai	บ้านทราย	Ban Mi	บ้านหมี่	Lopburi	ลพบุรี	Central
Ban Sai	บ้านไทร	Prasat	ปราสาท	Surin	สุรินทร์	Northeast
Ban Sai	บ้านไทร	Prakhon Chai	ประโคนชัย	Buriram	บุรีรัมย์	Northeast
Ban San	บ้านซ่าน	Si Samrong	ศรีสำโรง	Sukhothai	สุโขทัย	Central
Ban Sang	บ้านสร้าง	Ban Sang	บ้านสร้าง	Prachin Buri	ปราจีนบุรี	East
Ban Sang	บ้านสร้าง	Bang Pa-in	บางปะอิน	Phra Nakhon Si Ayutthaya	พระนครศรีอยุธยา	Central
Ban Sang	บ้านสาง	Mueang Phayao	เมืองพะเยา	Phayao	พะเยา	N
Ban Siao	บ้านเสียว	Na Wa	นาหว้า	Nakhon Phanom	นครพนม	Northeast
Ban Siao	บ้านเสี้ยว	Fak Tha	ฟากท่า	Uttaradit	อุตรดิตถ์	N
Ban Sing	บ้านสิงห์	Nang Rong	นางรอง	Buriram	บุรีรัมย์	Northeast
Ban Sing	บ้านสิงห์	Photharam	โพธาราม	Ratchaburi	ราชบุรี	West
Ban Soet	บ้านเซิด	Phanat Nikhom	พนัสนิคม	Chonburi	ชลบุรี	East
Ban Sok	บ้านโสก	Khon Sawan	คอนสวรรค์	Chaiyaphum	ชัยภูมิ	Northeast
Ban Sok	บ้านโสก	Lom Sak	หล่มสัก	Phetchabun	เพชรบูรณ์	Central
Ban Song	บ้านซ่ง	Khamcha-i	คำชะอี	Mukdahan	มุกดาหาร	Northeast
Ban Song	บ้านซ่อง	Phanom Sarakham	พนมสารคาม	Chachoengsao	ฉะเชิงเทรา	East
Ban Song	บ้านส้อง	Wiang Sa	เวียงสระ	Surat Thani	สุราษฎร์ธานี	S
Ban Suan	บ้านสวน	Mueang Sukhothai	เมืองสุโขทัย	Sukhothai	สุโขทัย	Central
Ban Suan	บ้านสวน	Mueang Chonburi	เมืองชลบุรี	Chonburi	ชลบุรี	East
Ban Tai	บ้านต้าย	Sawang Daen Din	สว่างแดนดิน	Sakon Nakhon	สกลนคร	Northeast
Ban Tai	บ้านใต้	Ko Pha-ngan	เกาะพะงัน	Surat Thani	สุราษฎร์ธานี	S
Ban Tai	บ้านใต้	Mueang Kanchanaburi	เมืองกาญจนบุรี	Kanchanaburi	กาญจนบุรี	West
Ban Tako	บ้านตะโก	Huai Rat	ห้วยราช	Buriram	บุรีรัมย์	Northeast
Ban Tam	บ้านต๊ำ	Mueang Phayao	เมืองพะเยา	Phayao	พะเยา	N
Ban Tan	บ้านตาล	Hot	ฮอด	Chiang Mai	เชียงใหม่	N
Ban Tan	บ้านตาล	Bamnet Narong	บำเหน็จณรงค์	Chaiyaphum	ชัยภูมิ	Northeast
Ban Tao	บ้านเต่า	Ban Thaen	บ้านแท่น	Chaiyaphum	ชัยภูมิ	Northeast
Ban Tat	บ้านตาด	Ban Dung	บ้านดุง	Udon Thani	อุดรธานี	Northeast
Ban Tat	บ้านตาด	Mueang Udon Thani	เมืองอุดรธานี	Udon Thani	อุดรธานี	Northeast
Ban Thaen	บ้านแท่น	Chonnabot	ชนบท	Khon Kaen	ขอนแก่น	Northeast
Ban Thaen	บ้านแท่น	Ban Thaen	บ้านแท่น	Chaiyaphum	ชัยภูมิ	Northeast
Ban Thai	บ้านไทย	Khueang Nai	เขื่องใน	Ubon Ratchathani	อุบลราชธานี	Northeast
Ban Tham	บ้านถ้ำ	Dok Khamtai	ดอกคำใต้	Phayao	พะเยา	N
Ban Tham	บ้านทาม	Si Maha Phot	ศรีมหาโพธิ	Prachin Buri	ปราจีนบุรี	East
Ban Thamniap	บ้านทำเนียบ	Khiri Rat Nikhom	คีรีรัฐนิคม	Surat Thani	สุราษฎร์ธานี	S
Ban Than	บ้านทาน	Ban Lat	บ้านลาด	Phetchaburi	เพชรบุรี	West
Ban Thap	บ้านทับ	Mae Chaem	แม่แจ่ม	Chiang Mai	เชียงใหม่	N
Ban That	บ้านธาตุ	Phen	เพ็ญ	Udon Thani	อุดรธานี	Northeast
Ban That	บ้านธาตุ	Kaeng Khoi	แก่งคอย	Saraburi	สระบุรี	Central
Ban Thi	บ้านธิ	Ban Thi	บ้านธิ	Lamphun	ลำพูน	N
Ban Thin	บ้านถิ่น	Mueang Phrae	เมืองแพร่	Phrae	แพร่	N
Ban Thin	บ้านถิ่น	Non Sang	โนนสัง	Nong Bua Lamphu	หนองบัวลำภู	Northeast
Ban Thon	บ้านถ่อน	Sawang Daen Din	สว่างแดนดิน	Sakon Nakhon	สกลนคร	Northeast
Ban Thon	บ้านถ่อน	Tha Bo	ท่าบ่อ	Nong Khai	หนองคาย	Northeast
Ban Thum	บ้านทุ่ม	Mueang Khon Kaen	เมืองขอนแก่น	Khon Kaen	ขอนแก่น	Northeast
Ban Tio	บ้านติ้ว	Lom Sak	หล่มสัก	Phetchabun	เพชรบูรณ์	Central
Ban Tok	บ้านโตก	Mueang Phetchabun	เมืองเพชรบูรณ์	Phetchabun	เพชรบูรณ์	Central
Ban Tom	บ้านต๋อม	Mueang Phayao	เมืองพะเยา	Phayao	พะเยา	N
Ban Ton	บ้านต้อน	Rattanawapi	รัตนวาปี	Nong Khai	หนองคาย	Northeast
Ban Ton	บ้านโต้น	Phra Yuen	พระยืน	Khon Kaen	ขอนแก่น	Northeast
Ban Tong	บ้านต้อง	Seka	เซกา	Bueng Kan	บึงกาฬ	Northeast
Ban Tuek	บ้านตึก	Si Satchanalai	ศรีสัชนาลัย	Sukhothai	สุโขทัย	Central
Ban Tum	บ้านตูม	Na Chaluai	นาจะหลวย	Ubon Ratchathani	อุบลราชธานี	Northeast
Ban Tun	บ้านตุ่น	Mueang Phayao	เมืองพะเยา	Phayao	พะเยา	N
Ban Tun	บ้านตูล	Cha-uat	ชะอวด	Nakhon Si Thammarat	นครศรีธรรมราช	S
Ban Ueam	บ้านเอื้อม	Mueang Lampang	เมืองลำปาง	Lampang	ลำปาง	N
Ban Ueang	บ้านเอื้อง	Si Songkhram	ศรีสงคราม	Nakhon Phanom	นครพนม	Northeast
Ban Wa	บ้านหว้า	Bang Pa-in	บางปะอิน	Phra Nakhon Si Ayutthaya	พระนครศรีอยุธยา	Central
Ban Wa	บ้านหว้า	Mueang Khon Kaen	เมืองขอนแก่น	Khon Kaen	ขอนแก่น	Northeast
Ban Waen	บ้านแหวน	Hang Dong	หางดง	Chiang Mai	เชียงใหม่	N
Ban Waeng	บ้านแวง	Phutthaisong	พุทไธสง	Buriram	บุรีรัมย์	Northeast
Ban Wai	บ้านหวาย	Wapi Pathum	วาปีปทุม	Maha Sarakham	มหาสารคาม	Northeast
Ban Wai	บ้านหวาย	Lom Sak	หล่มสัก	Phetchabun	เพชรบูรณ์	Central
Ban Wan	บ้านว่าน	Tha Bo	ท่าบ่อ	Nong Khai	หนองคาย	Northeast
Ban Wang	บ้านวัง	Non Thai	โนนไทย	Nakhon Ratchasima	นครราชสีมา	Northeast
Ban Wiang	บ้านเวียง	Rong Kwang	ร้องกวาง	Phrae	แพร่	N
Ban Ya	บ้านยา	Nong Han	หนองหาน	Udon Thani	อุดรธานี	Northeast
Ban Yaeng	บ้านแยง	Nakhon Thai	นครไทย	Phitsanulok	พิษณุโลก	Central
Ban Yai	บ้านใหญ่	Phak Hai	ผักไห่	Phra Nakhon Si Ayutthaya	พระนครศรีอยุธยา	Central
Ban Yai	บ้านใหญ่	Mueang Nakhon Nayok	เมืองนครนายก	Nakhon Nayok	นครนายก	Central
Ban Yang	บ้านยาง	Sao Hai	เสาไห้	Saraburi	สระบุรี	Central
Ban Yang	บ้านยาง	Kaset Sombun	เกษตรสมบูรณ์	Chaiyaphum	ชัยภูมิ	Northeast
Ban Yang	บ้านยาง	Lam Plai Mat	ลำปลายมาศ	Buriram	บุรีรัมย์	Northeast
Ban Yang	บ้านยาง	Lam Thamenchai	ลำทะเมนชัย	Nakhon Ratchasima	นครราชสีมา	Northeast
Ban Yang	บ้านยาง	Khiri Rat Nikhom	คีรีรัฐนิคม	Surat Thani	สุราษฎร์ธานี	S
Ban Yang	บ้านยาง	Mueang Nakhon Pathom	เมืองนครปฐม	Nakhon Phanom	นครพนม	Northeast
Ban Yang	บ้านยาง	Wat Bot	วัดโบสถ์	Phitsanulok	พิษณุโลก	Central
Ban Yang	บ้านยาง	Mueang Buriram	เมืองบุรีรัมย์	Buriram	บุรีรัมย์	Northeast
Ban Yang	บ้านยาง	Phutthaisong	พุทไธสง	Buriram	บุรีรัมย์	Northeast
Ban Yuak	บ้านหยวก	Nam Som	น้ำโสม	Udon Thani	อุดรธานี	Northeast
Ban Yuat	บ้านยวด	Sang Khom	สร้างคอม	Udon Thani	อุดรธานี	Northeast
Bana	บานา	Mueang Pattani (Malay: Patani)	เมืองปัตตานี	Pattani	ปัตตานี	S
Bang Bai Mai	บางใบไม้	Mueang Surat Thani	เมืองสุราษฎร์ธานี	Surat Thani	สุราษฎร์ธานี	S
Bang Bamru	บางบำหรุ	Khet Bang Phlat	บางพลัด	Bangkok	กรุงเทพมหานคร	Central
Bang Ban	บางบาล	Bang Ban	บางบาล	Phra Nakhon Si Ayutthaya	พระนครศรีอยุธยา	Central
Bang Bo	บางบ่อ	Bang Bo	บางบ่อ	Samut Prakan	สมุทรปราการ	Central
Bang Bon Nuea	บางบอนเหนือ	Khet Bang Bon	บางบอน	Bangkok	กรุงเทพมหานคร	Central
Bang Bon Tai	บางบอนใต้	Khet Bang Bon	บางบอน	Bangkok	กรุงเทพมหานคร	Central
Bang Boribun	บางบริบูรณ์	Mueang Prachinburi	เมืองปราจีนบุรี	Prachin Buri	ปราจีนบุรี	East
Bang Bua Thong	บางบัวทอง	Bang Bua Thong	บางบัวทอง	Nonthaburi	นนทบุรี	Central
Bang But	บางบุตร	Ban Khai	บ้านค่าย	Rayong	ระยอง	East
Bang Chak	บางจัก	Wiset Chai Chan	วิเศษชัยชาญ	Ang Thong	อ่างทอง	Central
Bang Chak	บางจาก	Khet Phasi Charoen	ภาษีเจริญ	Bangkok	กรุงเทพมหานคร	Central
Bang Chak	บางจาก	Khet Phra Khanong	พระโขนง	Bangkok	กรุงเทพมหานคร	Central
Bang Chak	บางจาก	Mueang Phetchaburi	เมืองเพชรบุรี	Phetchaburi	เพชรบุรี	West
Bang Chak	บางจาก	Mueang Nakhon Si Thammarat	นครศรีธรรมราช	Nakhon Si Thammarat	นครศรีธรรมราช	S
Bang Chak	บางจาก	Phra Pradaeng	พระประแดง	Samut Prakan	สมุทรปราการ	Central
Bang Chakreng	บางจะเกร็ง	Mueang Samut Songkhram	เมืองสมุทรสงคราม	Samut Songkhram	สมุทรสงคราม	Central
Bang Chalong	บางโฉลง	Bang Phli	บางพลี	Samut Prakan	สมุทรปราการ	Central
Bang Chan	บางจาน	Mueang Phetchaburi	เมืองเพชรบุรี	Phetchaburi	เพชรบุรี	West
Bang Chan	บางชัน	Khet Khlong Sam Wa	คลองสามวา	Bangkok	กรุงเทพมหานคร	Central
Bang Chan	บางชัน	Khlung	ขลุง	Chanthaburi	จันทบุรี	East
Bang Chana	บางชนะ	Mueang Surat Thani	เมืองสุราษฎร์ธานี	Surat Thani	สุราษฎร์ธานี	S
Bang Chang	บางช้าง	Amphawa	อัมพวา	Samut Songkhram	สมุทรสงคราม	Central
Bang Chang	บางช้าง	Sam Phran	สามพราน	Nakhon Pathom	นครปฐม	Central
Bang Chani	บางชะนี	Bang Ban	บางบาล	Phra Nakhon Si Ayutthaya	พระนครศรีอยุธยา	Central
Bang Chao Cha	บางเจ้าฉ่า	Pho Thong	โพธิ์ทอง	Ang Thong	อ่างทอง	Central
Bang Chueak Nang	บางเชือกหนัง	Khet Taling Chan	ตลิ่งชัน	Bangkok	กรุงเทพมหานคร	Central
Bang Decha	บางเดชะ	Mueang Prachinburi	เมืองปราจีนบุรี	Prachin Buri	ปราจีนบุรี	East
Bang Di	บางดี	Huai Yot	ห้วยยอด	Trang	ตรัง	S
Bang Duan	บางด้วน	Khet Phasi Charoen	ภาษีเจริญ	Bangkok	กรุงเทพมหานคร	Central
Bang Duan	บางด้วน	Mueang Samut Prakan	เมืองสมุทรปราการ	Samut Prakan	สมุทรปราการ	Central
Bang Duan	บางด้วน	Palian	ปะเหลียน	Trang	ตรัง	S
Bang Duea	บางเดื่อ	Mueang Pathum Thani	เมืองปทุมธานี	Pathum Thani	ปทุมธานี	Central
Bang Duean	บางเดือน	Phunphin	พุนพิน	Surat Thani	สุราษฎร์ธานี	S
Bang Hak	บางหัก	Phan Thong	พานทอง	Chonburi	ชลบุรี	East
Bang Hak	บางหัก	Bang Ban	บางบาล	Phra Nakhon Si Ayutthaya	พระนครศรีอยุธยา	Central
Bang Hin	บางหิน	Kapoe	กะเปอร์	Ranong	ระนอง	S
Bang Hua Suea	บางหัวเสือ	Phra Pradaeng	พระประแดง	Samut Prakan	สมุทรปราการ	Central
Bang Kacha	บางกะจะ	Mueang Chanthaburi	เมืองจันทบุรี	Chanthaburi	จันทบุรี	East
Bang Kachai	บางกะไชย	Laem Sing	แหลมสิงห์	Chanthaburi	จันทบุรี	East
Bang Kachao	บางกะเจ้า	Phra Pradaeng	พระประแดง	Samut Prakan	สมุทรปราการ	Central
Bang Kadi	บางกะดี	Mueang Pathum Thani	เมืองปทุมธานี	Pathum Thani	ปทุมธานี	Central
Bang Kaeo	บางแก้ว	Mueang Ang Thong	เมืองอ่างทอง	Ang Thong	อ่างทอง	Central
Bang Kaeo	บางแก้ว	Bang Phli	บางพลี	Samut Prakan	สมุทรปราการ	Central
Bang Kaeo	บางแก้ว	Ban Laem	บ้านแหลม	Phetchaburi	เพชรบุรี	West
Bang Kaeo	บางแก้ว	Mueang Samut Songkhram	เมืองสมุทรสงคราม	Samut Songkhram	สมุทรสงคราม	Central
Bang Kaeo	บางแก้ว	La-un	ละอุ่น	Ranong	ระนอง	S
Bang Kaeo	บางแก้ว	Banphot Phisai	บรรพตพิสัย	Nakhon Sawan	นครสวรรค์	Central
Bang Kaeo	บางแก้ว	Mueang Chachoengsao	เมืองฉะเชิงเทรา	Chachoengsao	ฉะเชิงเทรา	East
Bang Kaeo	บางแก้ว	Nakhon Chai Si	นครชัยศรี	Nakhon Pathom	นครปฐม	Central
Bang Kaeo Fa	บางแก้วฟ้า	Nakhon Chai Si	นครชัยศรี	Nakhon Pathom	นครปฐม	Central
Bang Kahai	บางกะไห	Mueang Chachoengsao	เมืองฉะเชิงเทรา	Chachoengsao	ฉะเชิงเทรา	East
Bang Kao	บางเก่า	Sai Buri (Malay: Telube or Selindung Bayu)	สายบุรี	Pattani	ปัตตานี	S
Bang Kaphi	บางกะพี้	Ban Mi	บ้านหมี่	Lopburi	ลพบุรี	Central
Bang Kapi	บางกะปิ	Khet Huai Khwang	ห้วยขวาง	Bangkok	กรุงเทพมหานคร	Central
Bang Kha	บางคา	Ratchasan	ราชสาส์น	Chachoengsao	ฉะเชิงเทรา	East
Bang Khae	บางแค	Khet Bang Khae	บางแค	Bangkok	กรุงเทพมหานคร	Central
Bang Khae	บางแค	Amphawa	อัมพวา	Samut Songkhram	สมุทรสงคราม	Central
Bang Khae Nuea	บางแคเหนือ	Khet Bang Khae	บางแค	Bangkok	กรุงเทพมหานคร	Central
Bang Khaem	บางแขม	Mueang Nakhon Pathom	เมืองนครปฐม	Nakhon Pathom	นครปฐม	Northeast
Bang Kham	บางขาม	Ban Mi	บ้านหมี่	Lopburi	ลพบุรี	Central
Bang Kham	บางขาม	Ban Sang	บ้านสร้าง	Prachin Buri	ปราจีนบุรี	East
Bang Khamot	บางโขมด	Ban Mo	บ้านหมอ	Saraburi	สระบุรี	Central
Bang Khan Mak	บางขันหมาก	Mueang Lopburi	เมืองลพบุรี	Lopburi	ลพบุรี	Central
Bang Khan Taek	บางขันแตก	Mueang Samut Songkhram	เมืองสมุทรสงคราม	Samut Songkhram	สมุทรสงคราม	Central
Bang Khan	บางขัน	Bang Khan	บางขัน	Nakhon Si Thammarat	นครศรีธรรมราช	S
Bang Khanak	บางขนาก	Bang Nam Priao	บางน้ำเปรี้ยว	Chachoengsao	ฉะเชิงเทรา	East
Bang Khanun	บางขนุน	Bang Kruai	บางกรวย	Nonthaburi	นนทบุรี	Central
Bang Khao	บางเขา	Nong Chik	หนองจิก	Pattani	ปัตตานี	S
Bang Khayaeng	บางขะแยง	Mueang Pathum Thani	เมืองปทุมธานี	Pathum Thani	ปทุมธานี	Central
Bang Khem	บางเค็ม	Khao Yoi	เขาย้อย	Phetchaburi	เพชรบุรี	West
Bang Khen	บางเขน	Mueang Nonthaburi	เมืองนนทบุรี	Nonthaburi	นนทบุรี	Central
Bang Khian	บางเคียน	Chum Saeng	ชุมแสง	Nakhon Sawan	นครสวรรค์	Central
Bang Khiat	บางเขียด	Singhanakhon	สิงหนคร	Songkhla	สงขลา	S
Bang Khla	บางคล้า	Bang Khla	บางคล้า	Chachoengsao	ฉะเชิงเทรา	East
Bang Khlan	บางคลาน	Pho Thale	โพทะเล	Phichit	พิจิตร	Central
Bang Khlo	บางโคล่	Khet Bang Kho Laem	บางคอแหลม	Bangkok	กรุงเทพมหานคร	Central
Bang Kho Laem	บางคอแหลม	Khet Bang Kho Laem	บางคอแหลม	Bangkok	กรุงเทพมหานคร	Central
Bang Kho	บางค้อ	Khet Chom Thong	จอมทอง	Bangkok	กรุงเทพมหานคร	Central
Bang Khonthi	บางคนที	Bang Khonthi	บางคนที	Samut Songkhram	สมุทรสงคราม	Central
Bang Khrok	บางครก	Ban Laem	บ้านแหลม	Phetchaburi	เพชรบุรี	West
Bang Khru	บางครุ	Phra Pradaeng	พระประแดง	Samut Prakan	สมุทรปราการ	Central
Bang Khu Rat	บางคูรัด	Bang Bua Thong	บางบัวทอง	Nonthaburi	นนทบุรี	Central
Bang Khu Wat	บางคูวัด	Mueang Pathum Thani	เมืองปทุมธานี	Pathum Thani	ปทุมธานี	Central
Bang Khu Wiang	บางคูเวียง	Bang Kruai	บางกรวย	Nonthaburi	นนทบุรี	Central
Bang Khu	บางคู้	Tha Wung	ท่าวุ้ง	Lopburi	ลพบุรี	Central
Bang Khun Kong	บางขุนกอง	Bang Kruai	บางกรวย	Nonthaburi	นนทบุรี	Central
Bang Khun Non	บางขุนนนท์	Khet Bangkok Noi	บางกอกน้อย	Bangkok	กรุงเทพมหานคร	Central
Bang Khun Phrom	บางขุนพรหม	Khet Phra Nakhon	พระนคร	Bangkok	กรุงเทพมหานคร	Central
Bang Khun Sai	บางขุนไทร	Ban Laem	บ้านแหลม	Phetchaburi	เพชรบุรี	West
Bang Khun Si	บางขุนศรี	Khet Bangkok Noi	บางกอกน้อย	Bangkok	กรุงเทพมหานคร	Central
Bang Khun Thian	บางขุนเทียน	Khet Chom Thong	จอมทอง	Bangkok	กรุงเทพมหานคร	Central
Bang Khun Thong	บางขุนทอง	Tak Bai (Malay: Tabal)	ตากใบ	Narathiwat	นราธิวาส	S
Bang Khut	บางขุด	Sankhaburi	สรรคบุรี	Chai Nat	ชัยนาท	Central
Bang Khwan	บางขวัญ	Mueang Chachoengsao	เมืองฉะเชิงเทรา	Chachoengsao	ฉะเชิงเทรา	East
Bang Klam	บางกล่ำ	Bang Klam	บางกล่ำ	Songkhla	สงขลา	S
Bang Kluea	บางเกลือ	Bang Pakong	บางปะกง	Chachoengsao	ฉะเชิงเทรา	East
Bang Ko Bua	บางกอบัว	Phra Pradaeng	พระประแดง	Samut Prakan	สมุทรปราการ	Central
Bang Krabao	บางกระเบา	Ban Sang	บ้านสร้าง	Prachin Buri	ปราจีนบุรี	East
Bang Krabao	บางกระเบา	Nakhon Chai Si	นครชัยศรี	Nakhon Pathom	นครปฐม	Central
Bang Krabue	บางกระบือ	Sam Khok	สามโคก	Pathum Thani	ปทุมธานี	Central
Bang Krabue	บางกระบือ	Bang Khonthi	บางคนที	Samut Songkhram	สมุทรสงคราม	Central
Bang Krabue	บางกระบือ	Mueang Sing Buri	เมืองสิงห์บุรี	Sing Buri	สิงห์บุรี	Central
Bang Krachao	บางกระเจ้า	Mueang Samut Sakhon	เมืองสมุทรสาคร	Samut Sakhon	สมุทรสาคร	Central
Bang Krachet	บางกระเจ็ด	Bang Khla	บางคล้า	Chachoengsao	ฉะเชิงเทรา	East
Bang Krang	บางกร่าง	Mueang Nonthaburi	เมืองนนทบุรี	Nonthaburi	นนทบุรี	Central
Bang Krasan	บางกระสั้น	Bang Pa-in	บางปะอิน	Phra Nakhon Si Ayutthaya	พระนครศรีอยุธยา	Central
Bang Kraso	บางกระสอ	Mueang Nonthaburi	เมืองนนทบุรี	Nonthaburi	นนทบุรี	Central
Bang Krasop	บางกระสอบ	Phra Pradaeng	พระประแดง	Samut Prakan	สมุทรปราการ	Central
Bang Krathuek	บางกระทึก	Sam Phran	สามพราน	Nakhon Pathom	นครปฐม	Central
Bang Krathum	บางกระทุ่ม	Bang Krathum	บางกระทุ่ม	Phitsanulok	พิษณุโลก	Central
Bang Kro	บางโกระ	Khok Pho	โคกโพธิ์	Pattani	ปัตตานี	S
Bang Kruai	บางกรวย	Bang Kruai	บางกรวย	Nonthaburi	นนทบุรี	Central
Bang Krut	บางกรูด	Ban Pho	บ้านโพธิ์	Chachoengsao	ฉะเชิงเทรา	East
Bang Kung	บางกุ้ง	Mueang Surat Thani	เมืองสุราษฎร์ธานี	Surat Thani	สุราษฎร์ธานี	S
Bang Kung	บางกุ้ง	Mueang Suphanburi	เมืองสุพรรณบุรี	Suphan Buri	สุพรรณบุรี	Central
Bang Kung	บางกุ้ง	Si Maha Phot	ศรีมหาโพธิ	Prachin Buri	ปราจีนบุรี	East
Bang Kung	บางกุ้ง	Huai Yot	ห้วยยอด	Trang	ตรัง	S
Bang Kung	บางกุ้ง	Bang Khonthi	บางคนที	Samut Songkhram	สมุทรสงคราม	Central
Bang Lai	บางลาย	Bueng Na Rang	บึงนาราง	Phichit	พิจิตร	Central
Bang Lamphu Lang	บางลำภูล่าง	Khet Khlong San	คลองสาน	Bangkok	กรุงเทพมหานคร	Central
Bang Lamung	บางละมุง	Bang Lamung	บางละมุง	Chonburi	ชลบุรี	East
Bang Lao	บางเล่า	Khlong Khuean	คลองเขื่อน	Chachoengsao	ฉะเชิงเทรา	East
Bang Len	บางเลน	Bang Len	บางเลน	Nakhon Pathom	นครปฐม	Central
Bang Len	บางเลน	Bang Yai	บางใหญ่	Nonthaburi	นนทบุรี	Central
Bang Len	บางเลน	Song Phi Nong	สองพี่น้อง	Suphan Buri	สุพรรณบุรี	Central
Bang Li	บางลี่	Tha Wung	ท่าวุ้ง	Lopburi	ลพบุรี	Central
Bang Luang Dot	บางหลวงโดด	Bang Ban	บางบาล	Phra Nakhon Si Ayutthaya	พระนครศรีอยุธยา	Central
Bang Luang	บางหลวง	Bang Ban	บางบาล	Phra Nakhon Si Ayutthaya	พระนครศรีอยุธยา	Central
Bang Luang	บางหลวง	Bang Len	บางเลน	Nakhon Pathom	นครปฐม	Central
Bang Luang	บางหลวง	Sapphaya	สรรพยา	Chai Nat	ชัยนาท	Central
Bang Luang	บางหลวง	Mueang Pathum Thani	เมืองปทุมธานี	Pathum Thani	ปทุมธานี	Central
Bang Luek	บางลึก	Mueang Chumphon	เมืองชุมพร	Chumphon	ชุมพร	S
Bang Luk Suea	บางลูกเสือ	Ongkharak	องครักษ์	Nakhon Nayok	นครนายก	Central
Bang Maduea	บางมะเดื่อ	Phunphin	พุนพิน	Surat Thani	สุราษฎร์ธานี	S
Bang Mae Nang	บางแม่นาง	Bang Yai	บางใหญ่	Nonthaburi	นนทบุรี	Central
Bang Mafo	บางมะฝ่อ	Krok Phra	โกรกพระ	Nakhon Sawan	นครสวรรค์	Central
Bang Mak	บางหมาก	Kantang	กันตัง	Trang	ตรัง	S
Bang Mak	บางหมาก	Mueang Chumphon	เมืองชุมพร	Chumphon	ชุมพร	S
Bang Man	บางมัญ	Mueang Sing Buri	เมืองสิงห์บุรี	Sing Buri	สิงห์บุรี	Central
Bang Maphrao	บางมะพร้าว	Lang Suan	หลังสวน	Chumphon	ชุมพร	S
Bang Mot	บางมด	Khet Chom Thong	จอมทอง	Bangkok	กรุงเทพมหานคร	Central
Bang Mot	บางมด	Khet Thung Khru	ทุ่งครุ	Bangkok	กรุงเทพมหานคร	Central
Bang Muang	บางม่วง	Bang Yai	บางใหญ่	Nonthaburi	นนทบุรี	Central
Bang Muang	บางม่วง	Takua Pa	ตะกั่วป่า	Phang Nga	พังงา	S
Bang Muang	บางม่วง	Mueang Nakhon Sawan	เมืองนครสวรรค์	Nakhon Sawan	นครสวรรค์	Central
Bang Mueang Mai	บางเมืองใหม่	Mueang Samut Prakan	เมืองสมุทรปราการ	Samut Prakan	สมุทรปราการ	Central
Bang Mueang	บางเมือง	Mueang Samut Prakan	เมืองสมุทรปราการ	Samut Prakan	สมุทรปราการ	Central
Bang Mun Nak	บางมูลนาก	Bang Mun Nak	บางมูลนาก	Phichit	พิจิตร	Central
Bang Na	บางนา	Maha Rat	มหาราช	Phra Nakhon Si Ayutthaya	พระนครศรีอยุธยา	Central
Bang Na Nuea	บางนาเหนือ	Khet Bang Na	บางนา	Bangkok	กรุงเทพมหานคร	Central
Bang Na Tai	บางนาใต้	Khet Bang Na	บางนา	Bangkok	กรุงเทพมหานคร	Central
Bang Nai Si	บางนายสี	Takua Pa	ตะกั่วป่า	Phang Nga	พังงา	S
Bang Nak	บางนาค	Mueang Narathiwat	เมืองนราธิวาส	Narathiwat	นราธิวาส	S
Bang Nam Chiao	บางน้ำเชี่ยว	Phrom Buri	พรหมบุรี	Sing Buri	สิงห์บุรี	Central
Bang Nam Chuet	บางน้ำจืด	Mueang Samut Sakhon	เมืองสมุทรสาคร	Samut Sakhon	สมุทรสาคร	Central
Bang Nam Chuet	บางน้ำจืด	Lang Suan	หลังสวน	Chumphon	ชุมพร	S
Bang Nam Phueng	บางน้ำผึ้ง	Phra Pradaeng	พระประแดง	Samut Prakan	สมุทรปราการ	Central
Bang Nam Priao	บางน้ำเปรี้ยว	Bang Nam Priao	บางน้ำเปรี้ยว	Chachoengsao	ฉะเชิงเทรา	East
Bang Nang Li	บางนางลี่	Amphawa	อัมพวา	Samut Songkhram	สมุทรสงคราม	Central
Bang Nang	บางนาง	Phan Thong	พานทอง	Chonburi	ชลบุรี	East
Bang Nga	บางงา	Tha Wung	ท่าวุ้ง	Lopburi	ลพบุรี	Central
Bang Ngam	บางงาม	Si Prachan	ศรีประจันต์	Suphan Buri	สุพรรณบุรี	Central
Bang Ngon	บางงอน	Phunphin	พุนพิน	Surat Thani	สุราษฎร์ธานี	S
Bang Nok Khwaek	บางนกแขวก	Bang Khonthi	บางคนที	Samut Songkhram	สมุทรสงคราม	Central
Bang Nom Kho	บางนมโค	Sena	เสนา	Phra Nakhon Si Ayutthaya	พระนครศรีอยุธยา	Central
Bang Non	บางนอน	Mueang Ranong	เมืองระนอง	Ranong	ระนอง	S
Bang Nop	บางนบ	Hua Sai	หัวไทร	Nakhon Si Thammarat	นครศรีธรรมราช	S
Bang O	บางอ้อ	Khet Bang Phlat	บางพลัด	Bangkok	กรุงเทพมหานคร	Central
Bang O	บางอ้อ	Ban Na	บ้านนา	Nakhon Nayok	นครนายก	Central
Bang Pa	บางป่า	Mueang Ratchaburi	เมืองราชบุรี	Ratchaburi	ราชบุรี	West
Bang Pakok	บางปะกอก	Khet Rat Burana	ราษฎร์บูรณะ	Bangkok	กรุงเทพมหานคร	Central
Bang Pakong	บางปะกง	Bang Pakong	บางปะกง	Chachoengsao	ฉะเชิงเทรา	East
Bang Pao	บางเป้า	Kantang	กันตัง	Trang	ตรัง	S
Bang Phae	บางแพ	Bang Phae	บางแพ	Ratchaburi	ราชบุรี	West
Bang Phai	บางไผ่	Khet Bang Khae	บางแค	Bangkok	กรุงเทพมหานคร	Central
Bang Phai	บางไผ่	Bang Mun Nak	บางมูลนาก	Phichit	พิจิตร	Central
Bang Phai	บางไผ่	Mueang Chachoengsao	เมืองฉะเชิงเทรา	Chachoengsao	ฉะเชิงเทรา	East
Bang Phai	บางไผ่	Mueang Nonthaburi	เมืองนนทบุรี	Nonthaburi	นนทบุรี	Central
Bang Phasi	บางภาษี	Bang Len	บางเลน	Nakhon Pathom	นครปฐม	Central
Bang Phlap	บางพลับ	Pak Kret	ปากเกร็ด	Nonthaburi	นนทบุรี	Central
Bang Phlap	บางพลับ	Pho Thong	โพธิ์ทอง	Ang Thong	อ่างทอง	Central
Bang Phlap	บางพลับ	Song Phi Nong	สองพี่น้อง	Suphan Buri	สุพรรณบุรี	Central
Bang Phlat	บางพลัด	Khet Bang Phlat	บางพลัด	Bangkok	กรุงเทพมหานคร	Central
Bang Phli Noi	บางพลีน้อย	Bang Bo	บางบ่อ	Samut Prakan	สมุทรปราการ	Central
Bang Phli Yai	บางพลีใหญ่	Bang Phli	บางพลี	Samut Prakan	สมุทรปราการ	Central
Bang Phli	บางพลี	Bang Sai	บางไทร	Phra Nakhon Si Ayutthaya	พระนครศรีอยุธยา	Central
Bang Phluang	บางพลวง	Ban Sang	บ้านสร้าง	Prachin Buri	ปราจีนบุรี	East
Bang Pho Nuea	บางโพธิ์เหนือ	Sam Khok	สามโคก	Pathum Thani	ปทุมธานี	Central
Bang Pho	บางโพธิ์	Mueang Surat Thani	เมืองสุราษฎร์ธานี	Surat Thani	สุราษฎร์ธานี	S
Bang Phongphang	บางโพงพาง	Khet Yan Nawa	ยานนาวา	Bangkok	กรุงเทพมหานคร	Central
Bang Phra	บางพระ	Mueang Trat	เมืองตราด	Trat	ตราด	East
Bang Phra	บางพระ	Pak Phanang	ปากพนัง	Nakhon Si Thammarat	นครศรีธรรมราช	S
Bang Phra	บางพระ	Mueang Chachoengsao	เมืองฉะเชิงเทรา	Chachoengsao	ฉะเชิงเทรา	East
Bang Phra	บางพระ	Nakhon Chai Si	นครชัยศรี	Nakhon Pathom	นครปฐม	Central
Bang Phra Khru	บางพระครู	Nakhon Luang	นครหลวง	Phra Nakhon Si Ayutthaya	พระนครศรีอยุธยา	Central
Bang Phra Luang	บางพระหลวง	Mueang Nakhon Sawan	เมืองนครสวรรค์	Nakhon Sawan	นครสวรรค์	Central
Bang Phra Nuea	บางพระเหนือ	La-un	ละอุ่น	Ranong	ระนอง	S
Bang Phra Tai	บางพระใต้	La-un	ละอุ่น	Ranong	ระนอง	S
Bang Phriang	บางเพรียง	Bang Bo	บางบ่อ	Samut Prakan	สมุทรปราการ	Central
Bang Phrom	บางพรม	Khet Taling Chan	ตลิ่งชัน	Bangkok	กรุงเทพมหานคร	Central
Bang Phrom	บางพรม	Bang Khonthi	บางคนที	Samut Songkhram	สมุทรสงคราม	Central
Bang Phueng	บางผึ้ง	Bang Pakong	บางปะกง	Chachoengsao	ฉะเชิงเทรา	East
Bang Phueng	บางพึ่ง	Ban Mi	บ้านหมี่	Lopburi	ลพบุรี	Central
Bang Phueng	บางพึ่ง	Phra Pradaeng	พระประแดง	Samut Prakan	สมุทรปราการ	Central
Bang Phun	บางพูน	Mueang Pathum Thani	เมืองปทุมธานี	Pathum Thani	ปทุมธานี	Central
Bang Phut	บางพูด	Mueang Pathum Thani	เมืองปทุมธานี	Pathum Thani	ปทุมธานี	Central
Bang Phut	บางพูด	Pak Kret	ปากเกร็ด	Nonthaburi	นนทบุรี	Central
Bang Phutsa	บางพุทรา	Mueang Sing Buri	เมืองสิงห์บุรี	Sing Buri	สิงห์บุรี	Central
Bang Pit	บางปิด	Laem Ngop	แหลมงอบ	Trat	ตราด	East
Bang Pla Kot	บางปลากด	Pa Mok	ป่าโมก	Ang Thong	อ่างทอง	Central
Bang Pla Kot	บางปลากด	Ongkharak	องครักษ์	Nakhon Nayok	นครนายก	Central
Bang Pla Ma	บางปลาม้า	Bang Pla Ma	บางปลาม้า	Suphan Buri	สุพรรณบุรี	Central
Bang Pla Ra	บางปลาร้า	Ban Sang	บ้านสร้าง	Prachin Buri	ปราจีนบุรี	East
Bang Pla Soi	บางปลาสร้อย	Mueang Chonburi	เมืองชลบุรี	Chonburi	ชลบุรี	East
Bang Pla	บางปลา	Bang Len	บางเลน	Nakhon Pathom	นครปฐม	Central
Bang Pla	บางปลา	Bang Phli	บางพลี	Samut Prakan	สมุทรปราการ	Central
Bang Po	บางปอ	Mueang Narathiwat	เมืองนราธิวาส	Narathiwat	นราธิวาส	S
Bang Pradaeng	บางประแดง	Bang Pa-in	บางปะอิน	Phra Nakhon Si Ayutthaya	พระนครศรีอยุธยา	Central
Bang Pramung	บางประมุง	Krok Phra	โกรกพระ	Nakhon Sawan	นครสวรรค์	Central
Bang Prok	บางปรอก	Mueang Pathum Thani	เมืองปทุมธานี	Pathum Thani	ปทุมธานี	Central
Bang Prong	บางโปรง	Mueang Samut Prakan	เมืองสมุทรปราการ	Samut Prakan	สมุทรปราการ	Central
Bang Pu	บางปู	Mueang Samut Prakan	เมืองสมุทรปราการ	Samut Prakan	สมุทรปราการ	Central
Bang Pu	บางปู	Yaring (Malay: Jamu)	ยะหริ่ง	Pattani	ปัตตานี	S
Bang Pu Mai	บางปูใหม่	Mueang Samut Prakan	เมืองสมุทรปราการ	Samut Prakan	สมุทรปราการ	Central
Bang Rachan	บางระจัน	Khai Bang Rachan	ค่ายบางระจัน	Sing Buri	สิงห์บุรี	Central
Bang Rak Noi	บางรักน้อย	Mueang Nonthaburi	เมืองนนทบุรี	Nonthaburi	นนทบุรี	Central
Bang Rak Phatthana	บางรักพัฒนา	Bang Bua Thong	บางบัวทอง	Nonthaburi	นนทบุรี	Central
Bang Rak Yai	บางรักใหญ่	Bang Bua Thong	บางบัวทอง	Nonthaburi	นนทบุรี	Central
Bang Rak	บางรัก	Bang Rak	บางรัก	Bangkok	กรุงเทพมหานคร	Central
Bang Rak	บางรัก	Mueang Trang	เมืองตรัง	Trang	ตรัง	S
Bang Rakam	บางระกำ	Bang Rakam	บางระกำ	Phitsanulok	พิษณุโลก	Central
Bang Rakam	บางระกำ	Bang Len	บางเลน	Nakhon Pathom	นครปฐม	Central
Bang Rakam	บางระกำ	Nakhon Chai Si	นครชัยศรี	Nakhon Pathom	นครปฐม	Central
Bang Rakam	บางระกำ	Pho Thong	โพธิ์ทอง	Ang Thong	อ่างทอง	Central
Bang Rakam	บางระกำ	Nakhon Luang	นครหลวง	Phra Nakhon Si Ayutthaya	พระนครศรีอยุธยา	Central
Bang Ramat	บางระมาด	Khet Taling Chan	ตลิ่งชัน	Bangkok	กรุงเทพมหานคร	Central
Bang Riang	บางเหรียง	Khuan Niang	ควนเนียง	Songkhla	สงขลา	S
Bang Riang	บางเหรียง	Thap Put	ทับปุด	Phang Nga	พังงา	S
Bang Rin	บางริ้น	Mueang Ranong	เมืองระนอง	Ranong	ระนอง	S
Bang Rong	บางโรง	Khlong Khuean	คลองเขื่อน	Chachoengsao	ฉะเชิงเทรา	East
Bang Rup	บางรูป	Thung Yai	ทุ่งใหญ่	Nakhon Si Thammarat	นครศรีธรรมราช	S
Bang Sa Kao	บางสระเก้า	Laem Sing	แหลมสิงห์	Chanthaburi	จันทบุรี	East
Bang Sadet	บางเสด็จ	Pa Mok	ป่าโมก	Ang Thong	อ่างทอง	Central
Bang Sai Noi	บางทรายน้อย	Wan Yai	หว้านใหญ่	Mukdahan	มุกดาหาร	Northeast
Bang Sai Pa	บางไทรป่า	Bang Len	บางเลน	Nakhon Pathom	นครปฐม	Central
Bang Sai Yai	บางทรายใหญ่	Mueang Mukdahan	เมืองมุกดาหาร	Mukdahan	มุกดาหาร	Northeast
Bang Sai	บางซ้าย	Bang Sai	บางซ้าย	Phra Nakhon Si Ayutthaya	พระนครศรีอยุธยา	Central
Bang Sai	บางทราย	Mueang Chonburi	เมืองชลบุรี	Chonburi	ชลบุรี	East
Bang Sai	บางไทร	Bang Sai	บางไทร	Phra Nakhon Si Ayutthaya	พระนครศรีอยุธยา	Central
Bang Sai	บางไทร	Takua Pa	ตะกั่วป่า	Phang Nga	พังงา	S
Bang Sai	บางไทร	Mueang Surat Thani	เมืองสุราษฎร์ธานี	Surat Thani	สุราษฎร์ธานี	S
Bang Sak	บางสัก	Kantang	กันตัง	Trang	ตรัง	S
Bang Sakae	บางสะแก	Bang Khonthi	บางคนที	Samut Songkhram	สมุทรสงคราม	Central
Bang Sala	บางศาลา	Pak Phanang	ปากพนัง	Nakhon Si Thammarat	นครศรีธรรมราช	S
Bang Samak	บางสมัคร	Bang Pakong	บางปะกง	Chachoengsao	ฉะเชิงเทรา	East
Bang Sao Thong	บางเสาธง	Bang Sao Thong	บางเสาธง	Samut Prakan	สมุทรปราการ	Central
Bang Saphan	บางสะพาน	Bang Saphan Noi	บางสะพานน้อย	Prachuap Khiri Khan	ประจวบคีรีขันธ์	West
Bang Sare	บางเสร่	Sattahip	สัตหีบ	Chonburi	ชลบุรี	East
Bang Sawan	บางสวรรค์	Phrasaeng	พระแสง	Surat Thani	สุราษฎร์ธานี	S
Bang Si Mueang	บางศรีเมือง	Mueang Nonthaburi	เมืองนนทบุรี	Nonthaburi	นนทบุรี	Central
Bang Si Thong	บางสีทอง	Bang Kruai	บางกรวย	Nonthaburi	นนทบุรี	Central
Bang Sombun	บางสมบูรณ์	Ongkharak	องครักษ์	Nakhon Nayok	นครนายก	Central
Bang Son	บางซ่อน	Ban Pho	บ้านโพธิ์	Chachoengsao	ฉะเชิงเทรา	East
Bang Son	บางสน	Pathio	ปะทิว	Chumphon	ชุมพร	S
Bang Suan	บางสวน	Bang Khla	บางคล้า	Chachoengsao	ฉะเชิงเทรา	East
Bang Sue	บางซื่อ	Khet Bang Sue	บางซื่อ	Bangkok	กรุงเทพมหานคร	Central
Bang Ta Ngai	บางตาหงาย	Banphot Phisai	บรรพตพิสัย	Nakhon Sawan	นครสวรรค์	Central
Bang Ta Then	บางตาเถร	Song Phi Nong	สองพี่น้อง	Suphan Buri	สุพรรณบุรี	Central
Bang Tabun Ok	บางตะบูนออก	Ban Laem	บ้านแหลม	Phetchaburi	เพชรบุรี	West
Bang Tabun	บางตะบูน	Ban Laem	บ้านแหลม	Phetchaburi	เพชรบุรี	West
Bang Taen	บางแตน	Ban Sang	บ้านสร้าง	Prachin Buri	ปราจีนบุรี	East
Bang Takhian	บางตะเคียน	Song Phi Nong	สองพี่น้อง	Suphan Buri	สุพรรณบุรี	Central
Bang Talat	บางตลาด	Pak Kret	ปากเกร็ด	Nonthaburi	นนทบุรี	Central
Bang Talat	บางตลาด	Khlong Khuean	คลองเขื่อน	Chachoengsao	ฉะเชิงเทรา	East
Bang Tanai	บางตะไนย์	Pak Kret	ปากเกร็ด	Nonthaburi	นนทบุรี	Central
Bang Tanot	บางโตนด	Photharam	โพธาราม	Ratchaburi	ราชบุรี	West
Bang Taphong	บางตะพง	Pak Phanang	ปากพนัง	Nakhon Si Thammarat	นครศรีธรรมราช	S
Bang Tawa	บางตาวา	Nong Chik	หนองจิก	Pattani	ปัตตานี	S
Bang Tho Rat	บางโทรัด	Mueang Samut Sakhon	เมืองสมุทรสาคร	Samut Sakhon	สมุทรสาคร	Central
Bang Thong	บางทอง	Thai Mueang	ท้ายเหมือง	Phang Nga	พังงา	S
Bang Tin Pet	บางตีนเป็ด	Mueang Chachoengsao	เมืองฉะเชิงเทรา	Chachoengsao	ฉะเชิงเทรา	East
Bang Toei	บางเตย	Sam Khok	สามโคก	Pathum Thani	ปทุมธานี	Central
Bang Toei	บางเตย	Mueang Chachoengsao	เมืองฉะเชิงเทรา	Chachoengsao	ฉะเชิงเทรา	East
Bang Toei	บางเตย	Ban Sang	บ้านสร้าง	Prachin Buri	ปราจีนบุรี	East
Bang Toei	บางเตย	Mueang Phang Nga	เมืองพังงา	Phang Nga	พังงา	S
Bang Toei	บางเตย	Sam Phran	สามพราน	Nakhon Pathom	นครปฐม	Central
Bang Wa	บางหว้า	Khet Phasi Charoen	ภาษีเจริญ	Bangkok	กรุงเทพมหานคร	Central
Bang Waek	บางแวก	Khet Phasi Charoen	ภาษีเจริญ	Bangkok	กรุงเทพมหานคร	Central
Bang Wan	บางวัน	Khura Buri	คุระบุรี	Phang Nga	พังงา	S
Bang Wua	บางวัว	Bang Pakong	บางปะกง	Chachoengsao	ฉะเชิงเทรา	East
Bang Ya Phraek	บางหญ้าแพรก	Mueang Samut Sakhon	เมืองสมุทรสาคร	Samut Sakhon	สมุทรสาคร	Central
Bang Ya Phraek	บางหญ้าแพรก	Phra Pradaeng	พระประแดง	Samut Prakan	สมุทรปราการ	Central
Bang Yai	บางใหญ่	Bang Pla Ma	บางปลาม้า	Suphan Buri	สุพรรณบุรี	Central
Bang Yai	บางใหญ่	Bang Yai	บางใหญ่	Nonthaburi	นนทบุรี	Central
Bang Yai	บางใหญ่	Kra Buri	กระบุรี	Ranong	ระนอง	S
Bang Yang	บางยาง	Ban Sang	บ้านสร้าง	Prachin Buri	ปราจีนบุรี	East
Bang Yang	บางยาง	Krathum Baen	กระทุ่มแบน	Samut Sakhon	สมุทรสาคร	Central
Bang Yi Khan	บางยี่ขัน	Khet Bang Phlat	บางพลัด	Bangkok	กรุงเทพมหานคร	Central
Bang Yi Rong	บางยี่รงค์	Bang Khonthi	บางคนที	Samut Songkhram	สมุทรสงคราม	Central
Bang Yi Ruea	บางยี่เรือ	Khet Thon Buri	ธนบุรี	Bangkok	กรุงเทพมหานคร	Central
Bang Yi Tho	บางยี่โท	Bang Sai	บางไทร	Phra Nakhon Si Ayutthaya	พระนครศรีอยุธยา	Central
Bang Yo	บางยอ	Phra Pradaeng	พระประแดง	Samut Prakan	สมุทรปราการ	Central
Bangkao	บางเก่า	Cha-am	ชะอำ	Phetchaburi	เพชรบุรี	West
Banklang	บ้านกลาง	Chian Yai	เชียรใหญ่	Nakhon Si Thammarat	นครศรีธรรมราช	S
Banlang	บัลลังก์	Non Thai	โนนไทย	Nakhon Ratchasima	นครราชสีมา	Northeast
Bannang Sareng	บันนังสาเรง	Mueang Yala	เมืองยะลา	Yala	ยะลา	S
Bannang Sata	บันนังสตา	Bannang Sata (Malay: Benang Setar)	บันนังสตา	Yala	ยะลา	S
Baraho	บาราเฮาะ	Mueang Pattani (Malay: Patani)	เมืองปัตตานี	Pattani	ปัตตานี	S
Barahom	บาราโหม	Mueang Pattani (Malay: Patani)	เมืองปัตตานี	Pattani	ปัตตานี	S
Bare Nuea	บาเระเหนือ	Bacho (Malay: Bahcok)	บาเจาะ	Narathiwat	นราธิวาส	S
Bare Tai	บาเระใต้	Bacho (Malay: Bahcok)	บาเจาะ	Narathiwat	นราธิวาส	S
Baro	บาโร๊ะ	Yaha	ยะหา	Yala	ยะลา	S
Batong	บาตง	Rueso (Malay: Rusa)	รือเสาะ	Narathiwat	นราธิวาส	S
Benchakhon	เบญจขร	Khlong Hat	คลองหาด	Sa Kaeo	สระแก้ว	East
Betong	เบตง	Betong (Malay: Betung)	เบตง	Yala	ยะลา	S
Bing	บิง	Non Sung	โนนสูง	Nakhon Ratchasima	นครราชสีมา	Northeast
Bo	บ่อ	Khlung	ขลุง	Chanthaburi	จันทบุรี	East
Bo Bia	บ่อเบี้ย	Ban Khok	บ้านโคก	Uttaradit	อุตรดิตถ์	N
Bo Daeng	บ่อแดง	Sathing Phra	สทิงพระ	Songkhla	สงขลา	S
Bo Dan	บ่อดาน	Sathing Phra	สทิงพระ	Songkhla	สงขลา	S
Bo Haeo	บ่อแฮ้ว	Mueang Lampang	เมืองลำปาง	Lampang	ลำปาง	N
Bo Hin	บ่อหิน	Sikao	สิเกา	Trang	ตรัง	S
Bo Kaeo	บ่อแก้ว	Samoeng	สะเมิง	Chiang Mai	เชียงใหม่	N
Bo Kaeo	บ่อแก้ว	Na Khu	นาคู	Kalasin	กาฬสินธุ์	Northeast
Bo Kaeo	บ่อแก้ว	Mueang Chan	เมืองจันทร์	Sisaket	ศรีสะเกษ	Northeast
Bo Kaeo	บ่อแก้ว	Wang Hin	วังหิน	Sisaket	ศรีสะเกษ	Northeast
Bo Kaeo	บ่อแก้ว	Ban Muang	บ้านม่วง	Sakon Nakhon	สกลนคร	Northeast
Bo Kradan	บ่อกระดาน	Pak Tho	ปากท่อ	Ratchaburi	ราชบุรี	West
Bo Kru	บ่อกรุ	Doem Bang Nang Buat	เดิมบางนางบวช	Suphan Buri	สุพรรณบุรี	Central
Bo Kwang Thong	บ่อกวางทอง	Bo Thong	บ่อทอง	Chonburi	ชลบุรี	East
Bo Lek Long	บ่อเหล็กลอง	Long	ลอง	Phrae	แพร่	N
Bo Luang	บ่อหลวง	Hot	ฮอด	Chiang Mai	เชียงใหม่	N
Bo Nam Ron	บ่อน้ำร้อน	Kantang	กันตัง	Trang	ตรัง	S
Bo Ngoen	บ่อเงิน	Lat Lum Kaeo	ลาดหลุมแก้ว	Pathum Thani	ปทุมธานี	Central
Bo Nok	บ่อนอก	Mueang Prachuap Khiri Khan	เมืองประจวบคีรีขันธ์	Prachuap Khiri Khan	ประจวบคีรีขันธ์	West
Bo Phak	บ่อภาค	Chat Trakan	ชาติตระการ	Phitsanulok	พิษณุโลก	Central
Bo Phan Khan	บ่อพันขัน	Suwannaphum	สุวรรณภูมิ	Roi Et	ร้อยเอ็ด	Northeast
Bo Phlap	บ่อพลับ	Mueang Nakhon Pathom	เมืองนครปฐม	Nakhon Phanom	นครพนม	Northeast
Bo Phloi	บ่อพลอย	Bo Rai	บ่อไร่	Trat	ตราด	East
Bo Phloi	บ่อพลอย	Bo Phloi	บ่อพลอย	Kanchanaburi	กาญจนบุรี	West
Bo Pho	บ่อโพธิ์	Nakhon Thai	นครไทย	Phitsanulok	พิษณุโลก	Central
Bo Phong	บ่อโพง	Nakhon Luang	นครหลวง	Phra Nakhon Si Ayutthaya	พระนครศรีอยุธยา	Central
Bo Phu	บ่อพุ	Tha Mai	ท่าใหม่	Chanthaburi	จันทบุรี	East
Bo Phut	บ่อผุด	Ko Samui	เกาะสมุย	Surat Thani	สุราษฎร์ธานี	S
Bo Pla Thong	บ่อปลาทอง	Pak Thong Chai	ปักธงชัย	Nakhon Ratchasima	นครราชสีมา	Northeast
Bo Rae	บ่อแร่	Pho Thong	โพธิ์ทอง	Ang Thong	อ่างทอง	Central
Bo Rae	บ่อแร่	Wat Sing	วัดสิงห์	Chai Nat	ชัยนาท	Central
Bo Rang	บ่อรัง	Wichian Buri	วิเชียรบุรี	Phetchabun	เพชรบูรณ์	Central
Bo Saen	บ่อแสน	Thap Put	ทับปุด	Phang Nga	พังงา	S
Bo Sali	บ่อสลี	Hot	ฮอด	Chiang Mai	เชียงใหม่	N
Bo Suphan	บ่อสุพรรณ	Song Phi Nong	สองพี่น้อง	Suphan Buri	สุพรรณบุรี	Central
Bo Ta Lo	บ่อตาโล่	Wang Noi	วังน้อย	Phra Nakhon Si Ayutthaya	พระนครศรีอยุธยา	Central
Bo Thai	บ่อไทย	Nong Phai	หนองไผ่	Phetchabun	เพชรบูรณ์	Central
Bo Tham	บ่อถ้ำ	Khanu Woralaksaburi	ขาณุวรลักษบุรี	Kamphaeng Phet	กำแพงเพชร	Central
Bo Thong	บ่อทอง	Kabin Buri	กบินทร์บุรี	Prachin Buri	ปราจีนบุรี	East
Bo Thong	บ่อทอง	Nong Muang	หนองม่วง	Lopburi	ลพบุรี	Central
Bo Thong	บ่อทอง	Thong Saen Khan	ทองแสนขัน	Uttaradit	อุตรดิตถ์	N
Bo Thong	บ่อทอง	Nong Chik	หนองจิก	Pattani	ปัตตานี	S
Bo Thong	บ่อทอง	Bang Rakam	บางระกำ	Phitsanulok	พิษณุโลก	Central
Bo Thong	บ่อทองบ่อทอง	Bo Thong	บ่อทอง	Chonburi	ชลบุรี	East
Bo Tru	บ่อตรุ	Ranot (Malay: Renut)	ระโนด	Songkhla	สงขลา	S
Bo Welu	บ่อเวฬุ	Khlung	ขลุง	Chanthaburi	จันทบุรี	East
Bo Yai	บ่อใหญ่	Borabue	บรบือ	Maha Sarakham	มหาสารคาม	Northeast
Bo Yang	บ่อยาง	Sawang Arom	สว่างอารมณ์	Uthai Thani	อุทัยธานี	Central
Bo Yang	บ่อยาง	Mueang Songkhla (Malay: Singgora)	เมืองสงขลา	Songkhla	สงขลา	S
Bo-ngo	บองอ	Ra-ngae	ระแงะ	Narathiwat	นราธิวาส	S
Boek Phrai	เบิกไพร	Ban Pong	บ้านโป่ง	Ratchaburi	ราชบุรี	West
Boek Phrai	เบิกไพร	Chom Bueng	จอมบึง	Ratchaburi	ราชบุรี	West
Boet	เบิด	Rattanaburi	รัตนบุรี	Surin	สุรินทร์	Northeast
Bok	บก	Non Khun	โนนคูน	Sisaket	ศรีสะเกษ	Northeast
Bon	บอน	Samrong	สำโรง	Ubon Ratchathani	อุบลราชธานี	Northeast
Bong Nuea	บงเหนือ	Sawang Daen Din	สว่างแดนดิน	Sakon Nakhon	สกลนคร	Northeast
Bong Tai	บงใต้	Sawang Daen Din	สว่างแดนดิน	Sakon Nakhon	สกลนคร	Northeast
Bong Tan	บงตัน	Doi Tao	ดอยเต่า	Chiang Mai	เชียงใหม่	N
Bong Ti	บ้องตี้	Sai Yok	ไทรโยค	Kanchanaburi	กาญจนบุรี	West
Borabue	บรบือ	Borabue	บรบือ	Maha Sarakham	มหาสารคาม	Northeast
Boribun	บริบูรณ์	Si Chomphu	สีชมพู	Khon Kaen	ขอนแก่น	Northeast
Bot	โบสถ์	Phimai	พิมาย	Nakhon Ratchasima	นครราชสีมา	Northeast
Bowon Niwet	บวรนิเวศ	Khet Phra Nakhon	พระนคร	Bangkok	กรุงเทพมหานคร	Central
Bu Fai	บุฝ้าย	Prachantakham	ประจันตคาม	Prachin Buri	ปราจีนบุรี	East
Bu Hom	บุฮม	Chiang Khan	เชียงคาน	Loei	เลย	Northeast
Bu Kraeng	บุแกรง	Chom Phra	จอมพระ	Surin	สุรินทร์	Northeast
Bu Krasang	บุกระสัง	Nong Ki	หนองกี่	Buriram	บุรีรัมย์	Northeast
Bu Pho	บุโพธิ์	Lam Plai Mat	ลำปลายมาศ	Buriram	บุรีรัมย์	Northeast
Bu Phram	บุพราหมณ์	Na Di	นาดี	Prachin Buri	ปราจีนบุรี	East
Bu Pueai	บุเปือย	Nam Yuen	น้ำยืน	Ubon Ratchathani	อุบลราชธานี	Northeast
Bu Rue Si	บุฤาษี	Mueang Surin	เมืองสุรินทร์	Surin	สุรินทร์	Northeast
Bu Sung	บุสูง	Mueang Chan	เมืองจันทร์	Sisaket	ศรีสะเกษ	Northeast
Bu Sung	บุสูง	Wang Hin	วังหิน	Sisaket	ศรีสะเกษ	Northeast
Bua Ban	บัวบาน	Yang Talat	ยางตลาด	Kalasin	กาฬสินธุ์	Northeast
Bua Chum	บัวชุม	Chai Badan	ชัยบาดาล	Lopburi	ลพบุรี	Central
Bua Daeng	บัวแดง	Pathum Rat	ปทุมรัตต์	Roi Et	ร้อยเอ็ด	Northeast
Bua Hung	บัวหุ่ง	Rasi Salai	ราษีไศล	Sisaket	ศรีสะเกษ	Northeast
Bua Kham	บัวคำ	Pho Chai	โพธิ์ชัย	Roi Et	ร้อยเอ็ด	Northeast
Bua Khao	บัวขาว	Kuchinarai	กุฉินารายณ์	Kalasin	กาฬสินธุ์	Northeast
Bua Kho	บัวค้อ	Mueang Maha Sarakham	เมืองมหาสารคาม	Maha Sarakham	มหาสารคาม	Northeast
Bua Khok	บัวโคก	Tha Tum	ท่าตูม	Surin	สุรินทร์	Northeast
Bua Lai	บัวลาย	Bua Lai	บัวลาย	Nakhon Ratchasima	นครราชสีมา	Northeast
Bua Loi	บัวลอย	Nong Khae	หนองแค	Saraburi	สระบุรี	Central
Bua Mat	บัวมาศ	Borabue	บรบือ	Maha Sarakham	มหาสารคาม	Northeast
Bua Ngam	บัวงาม	Damnoen Saduak	ดำเนินสะดวก	Ratchaburi	ราชบุรี	West
Bua Ngam	บัวงาม	Det Udom	เดชอุดม	Ubon Ratchathani	อุบลราชธานี	Northeast
Bua Ngam	บัวงาม	Buntharik	บุณฑริก	Ubon Ratchathani	อุบลราชธานี	Northeast
Bua Ngoen	บัวเงิน	Nam Phong	น้ำพอง	Khon Kaen	ขอนแก่น	Northeast
Bua Noi	บัวน้อย	Kanthararom	กันทรารมย์	Sisaket	ศรีสะเกษ	Northeast
Bua Pak Tha	บัวปากท่า	Bang Len	บางเลน	Nakhon Pathom	นครปฐม	Central
Bua Sali	บัวสลี	Mae Lao	แม่ลาว	Chiang Rai	เชียงราย	N
Bua Thong	บัวทอง	Mueang Buriram	เมืองบุรีรัมย์	Buriram	บุรีรัมย์	Northeast
Bua Tum	บัวตูม	So Phisai	โซ่พิสัย	Bueng Kan	บึงกาฬ	Northeast
Bua Watthana	บัววัฒนา	Nong Phai	หนองไผ่	Phetchabun	เพชรบูรณ์	Central
Bua Yai	บัวใหญ่	Bua Yai	บัวใหญ่	Nakhon Ratchasima	นครราชสีมา	Northeast
Bua Yai	บัวใหญ่	Nam Phong	น้ำพอง	Khon Kaen	ขอนแก่น	Northeast
Buachet	บัวเชด	Buachet	บัวเชด	Surin	สุรินทร์	Northeast
Buak Khang	บวกค้าง	San Kamphaeng	สันกำแพง	Chiang Mai	เชียงใหม่	N
Budi	บุดี	Mueang Yala	เมืองยะลา	Yala	ยะลา	S
Bue Re	บือเระ	Sai Buri (Malay: Telube or Selindung Bayu)	สายบุรี	Pattani	ปัตตานี	S
Buemang	บือมัง	Raman (Malay: Reman)	รามัน	Yala	ยะลา	S
Bueng Ba	บึงบา	Nong Suea	หนองเสือ	Pathum Thani	ปทุมธานี	Central
Bueng Bon	บึงบอน	Nong Suea	หนองเสือ	Pathum Thani	ปทุมธานี	Central
Bueng Bon	บึงบอน	Yang Chum Noi	ยางชุมน้อย	Sisaket	ศรีสะเกษ	Northeast
Bueng Bua	บึงบัว	Wachirabarami	วชิรบารมี	Phichit	พิจิตร	Central
Bueng Bun	บึงบูรพ์	Bueng Bun	บึงบูรพ์	Sisaket	ศรีสะเกษ	Northeast
Bueng Cham O	บึงชำอ้อ	Nong Suea	หนองเสือ	Pathum Thani	ปทุมธานี	Central
Bueng Charoen	บึงเจริญ	Ban Kruat	บ้านกรวด	Buriram	บุรีรัมย์	Northeast
Bueng Ka Sam	บึงกาสาม	Nong Suea	หนองเสือ	Pathum Thani	ปทุมธานี	Central
Bueng Kan	บึงกาฬ	Mueang Bueng Kan	เมืองบึงกาฬ	Bueng Kan	บึงกาฬ	Northeast
Bueng Kham Phroi	บึงคำพร้อย	Lam Luk Ka	ลำลูกกา	Pathum Thani	ปทุมธานี	Central
Bueng Kho Hai	บึงคอไห	Lam Luk Ka	ลำลูกกา	Pathum Thani	ปทุมธานี	Central
Bueng Khong Long	บึงโขงหลง	Bueng Khong Long	บึงโขงหลง	Bueng Kan	บึงกาฬ	Northeast
Bueng Kluea	บึงเกลือ	Selaphum	เสลภูมิ	Roi Et	ร้อยเอ็ด	Northeast
Bueng Kok	บึงกอก	Bang Rakam	บางระกำ	Phitsanulok	พิษณุโลก	Central
Bueng Krachap	บึงกระจับ	Wichian Buri	วิเชียรบุรี	Phetchabun	เพชรบูรณ์	Central
Bueng Malu	บึงมะลู	Kantharalak	กันทรลักษ์	Sisaket	ศรีสะเกษ	Northeast
Bueng Na Rang	บึงนาราง	Bueng Na Rang	บึงนาราง	Phichit	พิจิตร	Central
Bueng Na Riang	บึงนาเรียง	Huai Mek	ห้วยเม็ก	Kalasin	กาฬสินธุ์	Northeast
Bueng Nakhon	บึงนคร	Thawat Buri	ธวัชบุรี	Roi Et	ร้อยเอ็ด	Northeast
Bueng Nam Rak	บึงน้ำรักษ์	Bang Nam Priao	บางน้ำเปรี้ยว	Chachoengsao	ฉะเชิงเทรา	East
Bueng Nam Rak	บึงน้ำรักษ์	Thanyaburi	ธัญบุรี	Pathum Thani	ปทุมธานี	Central
Bueng Ngam	บึงงาม	Nong Phok	หนองพอก	Roi Et	ร้อยเอ็ด	Northeast
Bueng Ngam	บึงงาม	Thung Khao Luang	ทุ่งเขาหลวง	Roi Et	ร้อยเอ็ด	Northeast
Bueng Niam	บึงเนียม	Mueang Khon Kaen	เมืองขอนแก่น	Khon Kaen	ขอนแก่น	Northeast
Bueng O	บึงอ้อ	Kham Thale So	ขามทะเลสอ	Nakhon Ratchasima	นครราชสีมา	Northeast
Bueng Phalai	บึงพะไล	Kaeng Sanam Nang	แก้งสนามนาง	Nakhon Ratchasima	นครราชสีมา	Northeast
Bueng Phra	บึงพระ	Mueang Phitsanulok	เมืองพิษณุโลก	Phitsanulok	พิษณุโลก	Central
Bueng Pla Thu	บึงปลาทู	Banphot Phisai	บรรพตพิสัย	Nakhon Sawan	นครสวรรค์	Central
Bueng Prue	บึงปรือ	Thepharak	เทพารักษ์	Nakhon Ratchasima	นครราชสีมา	Northeast
Bueng Sam Phan	บึงสามพัน	Bueng Sam Phan	บึงสามพัน	Phetchabun	เพชรบูรณ์	Central
Bueng Samakkhi	บึงสามัคคี	Bueng Samakkhi	บึงสามัคคี	Kamphaeng Phet	กำแพงเพชร	Central
Bueng Samrong	บึงสำโรง	Kaeng Sanam Nang	แก้งสนามนาง	Nakhon Ratchasima	นครราชสีมา	Northeast
Bueng San	บึงศาล	Ongkharak	องครักษ์	Nakhon Nayok	นครนายก	Central
Bueng Sanan	บึงสนั่น	Thanyaburi	ธัญบุรี	Pathum Thani	ปทุมธานี	Central
Bueng Senat	บึงเสนาท	Mueang Nakhon Sawan	เมืองนครสวรรค์	Nakhon Sawan	นครสวรรค์	Central
Bueng Thap Raet	บึงทับแรต	Lan Krabue	ลานกระบือ	Kamphaeng Phet	กำแพงเพชร	Central
Bueng Thawai	บึงทวาย	Tao Ngoi	เต่างอย	Sakon Nakhon	สกลนคร	Northeast
Bueng Thong Lang	บึงทองหลาง	Lam Luk Ka	ลำลูกกา	Pathum Thani	ปทุมธานี	Central
Bueng Wichai	บึงวิชัย	Mueang Kalasin	เมืองกาฬสินธุ์	Kalasin	กาฬสินธุ์	Northeast
Bueng Yitho	บึงยี่โถ	Thanyaburi	ธัญบุรี	Pathum Thani	ปทุมธานี	Central
Bueng	บึง	Khwao Sinarin	เขวาสินรินทร์	Surin	สุรินทร์	Northeast
Bueng	บึง	Si Racha	ศรีราชา	Chonburi	ชลบุรี	East
Bukit	บูกิต	Cho-airong	เจาะไอร้อง	Narathiwat	นราธิวาส	S
Bukkhalo	บุคคโล	Khet Thon Buri	ธนบุรี	Bangkok	กรุงเทพมหานคร	Central
Bun Koet	บุญเกิด	Dok Khamtai	ดอกคำใต้	Phayao	พะเยา	N
Bun Rueang	บุญเรือง	Chiang Khong	เชียงของ	Chiang Rai	เชียงราย	N
Bun Than	บุญทัน	Suwannakhuha	สุวรรณคูหา	Nong Bua Lamphu	หนองบัวลำภู	Northeast
Bung Kaeo	บุ่งแก้ว	Non Sa-at	โนนสะอาด	Udon Thani	อุดรธานี	Northeast
Bung Khilek	บุ่งขี้เหล็ก	Sung Noen	สูงเนิน	Nakhon Ratchasima	นครราชสีมา	Northeast
Bung Khla	บุ่งคล้า	Bung Khla	บุ่งคล้า	Bueng Kan	บึงกาฬ	Northeast
Bung Khla	บุ่งคล้า	Lom Sak	หล่มสัก	Phetchabun	เพชรบูรณ์	Central
Bung Khla	บุ่งคล้า	Mueang Chaiyaphum	เมืองชัยภูมิ	Chaiyaphum	ชัยภูมิ	Northeast
Bung Loet	บุ่งเลิศ	Moei Wadi	เมยวดี	Roi Et	ร้อยเอ็ด	Northeast
Bung Mai	บุ่งไหม	Warin Chamrap	วารินชำราบ	Ubon Ratchathani	อุบลราชธานี	Northeast
Bung Malaeng	บุ่งมะแลง	Sawang Wirawong	สว่างวีรวงศ์	Ubon Ratchathani	อุบลราชธานี	Northeast
Bung Namtao	บุ่งน้ำเต้า	Lom Sak	หล่มสัก	Phetchabun	เพชรบูรณ์	Central
Bung Wai	บุ่งหวาย	Warin Chamrap	วารินชำราบ	Ubon Ratchathani	อุบลราชธานี	Northeast
Bung	บุ่ง	Mueang Amnat Charoen	เมืองอำนาจเจริญ	Amnat Charoen	อำนาจเจริญ	Northeast
Bunnak Phatthana	บุญนาคพัฒนา	Mueang Lampang	เมืองลำปาง	Lampang	ลำปาง	N

== See also ==
- Organization of the government of Thailand
- List of districts of Thailand
- List of districts of Bangkok
- List of tambon in Thailand
- Provinces of Thailand
- List of municipalities in Thailand
