= Ba Wi =

Subdistrict in Trang Province

Coordinates: 7.267414°N 99.598912°E

Ba Wi ตำบลบ้าหวี
- Subdistrict
- Motto: โครงสร้างพื้นฐานดี การศึกษาทั่วถึง เศรษฐกิจก้าวหน้า ชุมชนน่าอยู่ เชิดชูศาสนาอนุรักษ์วัฒนธรรม
- Interactive map of Ba Wi
- Country: Thailand
- Province: Trang
- District: Hat Samran

Government
  - Type: Subdistrict Administrative Organization (SAO)
  - Head of SAO: Mongkol Churueng

Population (2026)
  - Total: 3,326
- Time zone: UTC+7 (ICT)

Ba Wi (Thai: ตำบลบ้าหวี, pronounced [bˈɑː wˈa͡ɪ]) is a tambon (subdistrict) of Hat Samran District, in Trang province, Thailand. In 2026, it had a population of 3,326 people.

== History ==
The name Ba Wi is from a man who loves to comb his long hair and washes with Sea bean soap every day, until one day his comb went missing and he started getting crazy. The locals started calling him as บ้าหวี meaning Crazy because of comb, which later became the subdistrict's name.

== Administration ==
=== Central administration ===
The tambon is divided into four administrative villages (mubans).

No.	Name	Thai	Population
1.	Nai Khao	ในเขา	900
2.	Ba Wi	บ้าหวี	513
3.	Thung Gor	ทุ่งกอ	1,291
4.	Ba Koh Sak	บาเกาะสัก	622
