= Bang Chao Cha =

Subdistrict in Pho Thong district, Ang Thong province, Thailand

Coordinates: 14.703546°N 100.417134°E

Bang Chao Cha (Thai: บางเจ้าฉ่า, pronounced [bāːŋ tɕâw ˨˩.t͡ɕʰaː˨˩]) is a tambon (subdistrict) of Pho Thong district, Ang Thong province, central Thailand.

== History and toponymy ==
Bang Chao Cha is an old community that has been around since the Ayutthaya period. At that time, Ang Thong was known as Mueang Wichian Chai Chan, an outpost of Ayutthaya.

In the late Ayutthaya period, Chao Cha (Mr. Cha), the village headman, gathered a group of locals to fight against the Burmese army in the Battle of Bang Rachan. When the battle at Bang Rachan was defeated, Chao Cha and the survivors settled here, which was on the west bank of the Noi River. It developed into a larger community until today. Hence, the community was named "Bang Chao Cha" (place of Chao Cha) after the name of the leader.

== Geography ==
Bang Chao Cha is the northern part of Pho Thong, approximately 9 km (5.6 mi) from the district centre and 16 km (9.9 mi) from downtown Ang Thong. The area is a lowland suitable for agriculture. The Noi River flowing through the east, and there is also an irrigation canal flowing through.

It borders Bang Rakam to the east, Ang Kaeo to the south, Khok Phutsa to the west and Ongkharak to the north, all are within its district.

== Administration ==
The area is administered by two local governments are Pho Thong Subdistrict Municipality and Bang Chao Cha Subdistrict Administrative Organization.

It is further divided into eight administrative mubans (villages).

== Population ==
As of December 2023, it has a total population of 3,245 (1,534 males, 1,711 females) in 1,207 households.

== Economy ==
Bang Chao Cha is considered the largest production site of hand-woven bamboo bags and baskets in the country. Some of them are miniatures as souvenirs. It is considered a local handicraft developed from everyday tools such as fish traps.

== Landmarks ==
Local landmarks include two giant resin trees towering side by side. It is said that both trees have been present since the subdistrict was founded. They represent the existence of the local culture and also the treasures of the nation. They are still in good condition and the third biggest ones in Thailand.
