= Bakdai =

Subdistrict in Surin Province

Bakdai ตำบลบักได
- Subdistrict
- Motto: ตำบลน่าอยู่ คู่คุณธรรม นำเศรษฐกิจพอเพียง ชุมชนเข้มแข็ง แหล่งท่องเที่ยวเชิงอนุรักษ์ เกษตรอินทรีย์เป็นหลัก รักษาสิ่งแวดล้อมถิ่น
- Country: Thailand
- Province: Surin
- District: Phanom Dong Rak

Government
  - Type: Subdistrict Administrative Organization (SAO)
  - Head of SAO: Nattaphat Bunmee

Population (2026)
  - Total: 4,660
- Time zone: UTC+7 (ICT)

Bakdai (Thai: ตำบลบักได, pronounced [bˈakda͡ɪ]) is a tambon (subdistrict) of Phanom Dong Rak District, in Surin province, Thailand. In 2026, it had a population of 4,660 people.

== History ==
The word “Bak Dai” (บักได) in Khmer, “Bak” (บัก) means broken, and “Dai” (ได) means arm. So the word Bakdai means armbreak

The locals said that there was a Thai merchant traveling from Siam down to Cambodia, passing through the forest. They came upon the shrine of a guardian spirit, so they entered to pray for blessings They promised that if they secured profits and returned safely as hoped, they would surely offer a buffalo in return.

After their trading businessman, they came back to Siam with a huge profit, likely due to the noble blessings of the ancestral spirit, Phu Ta. Upon reaching the Phanom Dong Rak Mountains, they stopped to rest at the border. They presented a young buffalo, tying it tightly to the arm of the spirit's statue. However, the young buffalo flinched very hard, causing the statue's arm to break.

=== Central administration ===
The tambon is divided into twenty administrative villages (mubans).

No.	Name	Thai	Population	Phu Yai Ban
1.	Run	รุน	587	Prachid Mutumachan
2.	Tha Sawang	ท่าสว่าง	286	Salee Jindasri
3.	Don Nam Tan	ดอนน้ำตาล	5	Bunkoetchok Lapkhrongtham
4.	Bu Ampaw	บุอำเปาว์	1	Mueay Yingjenjob
5.	Hua Ang	หัวอ่าง	0	Suthep Putthayanto
6.	Ampil	อำปึล	369	Pranom Daisai
7.	Pho Thong	โพธิ์ทอง	195	Thanakon Kongthawee
8.	Khok Sung	โคกสูง	1,046	Suphap Srisopha
9.	Nong Raed	หนองแรด	151	Ratree Prakaiphet
10.	Noen Yang Kud	โนนยางกุด	69	Samai Sunthon
11.	U-lok	อุโลก	78	Phadungkiat Sujimawit
12.	Sa-kor	สกอร์	68	Suchat Samranjai
13.	Na Phun	นาพูน	24	Weerawat Saepphobdee (Kamnan)
14.	Nong Ta Loeb	หนองตาเลิบ	0	Bunhome Chaisongkhram
15.	Nong Waeng	หนองแวง	67	Nukan Phuthong
16.	Thai Santisuk	ไทยสันติสุข	626	Wimol Khaengphenkhae
17.	Thai Niyom Phattana	ไทยนิยมพัฒนา	58	Janphen Samai
18.	Phanom Dong Rak	พนมดงรัก	243	Sirimongkhon Wongplaek
19.	Khao To	เขาโต๊ะ	55	Baiphoen Judngam
20.	Bak Dai	บักได	730	Sanob Somset
