= Ba Wa =

Subdistrict in Sakon Nakhon Province

Coordinates: 17.507499°N 103.978421°E

Ba Wa ตำบลบะหว้า
- Subdistrict
- Motto: บะหว้าเมืองน่าอยู่ ควบคู่วัฒนธรรม ก้าวนำการศึกษา ก้าวหน้าเศรษฐกิจ ทุกชีวิตมีความเข้มแข็ง
- Interactive map of Ba Wa
- Country: Thailand
- Province: Sakon Nakhon
- District: Akat Amnuai

Government
  - Type: Subdistrict Administrative Organization (SAO)
  - Head of SAO: Nattaphong Traiyothi

Population (2026)
  - Total: 1,200
- Time zone: UTC+7 (ICT)

Ba Wa (Thai: ตำบลบะหว้า, pronounced [baː˧ waː˧]) is a tambon (subdistrict) of Akat Amnuai District, in Sakon Nakhon province, Thailand. In 2026, it had a population of 1,200 people.

== History ==
Ba Wa was consists of Tai Yo, Tai Yoei and Tai-Lao people. It was a village under Phon Paeng Subdistrict before getting separated in 1982. The first kamnan of the subdistrict was Mr.Somphon Duangsupha

== Administration ==
=== Central administration ===
The tambon is divided into nine administrative villages (mubans).

No.	Name	Thai	Population
1.	Wang Muang	วังม่วง	108
2.	Ba Wa	บะหว้า	150
3.	Ba Yao Yai	บะยาวใหญ่	347
4.	Mennoi	เม่นน้อย	81
5.	Ba Yao Noi	บะยาวน้อย	52
6.	Si Yaek Boribun	สี่แยกบริบูรณ์	44
7.	Ba Wa	บะหว้า	207
8.	Wang Muang	วังม่วง	80
9.	Ba Wa	บะหว้า	131
