= Bak Dong =

Subdistrict in Si Sa Ket Province

Bak Dong ตำบลบักดอง
- Subdistrict
- Motto: ประชาชนมีอาชีพพึ่งตนเองได้ตามหลักปรัชญาของเศรษฐกิจพอเพียง พัฒนาโครงสร้างพื้นฐานให้เพียงพอต่อประชาชน รักษาจารีตประเพณีที่ดีของท้องถิ่น
- Country: Thailand
- Province: Si Sa Ket
- District: Khun Han

Government
  - Type: Subdistrict Administrative Organization (SAO)
  - Head of SAO: Buanwat Rungkham

Population (2026)
  - Total: 9,963
- Time zone: UTC+7 (ICT)

Bak Dong (Thai: ตำบลบักดอง, pronounced [bˈak dˈɒŋ]) is a tambon (subdistrict) of Khun Han District, in Si Sa Ket province, Thailand. In 2026, it had a population of 9,963 people.

== History ==
Ban Bak Dong is a village located in the Bak Dong Subdistrict, Khun Han District, Sisaket Province. The name "Bak Dong" was named after a type of tree called Bak Dong (Thai: ต้นบักดอง) the area. In Isan language, this tree was called “Bak Dong,” while in some northeastern regions it was also known as the “rotten egg tree.” Because so many of these trees were found there, the village came to be called Ban Bak Dong.

== Administration ==
=== Central administration ===
The tambon is divided into twelve administrative villages (mubans).

No.	Name	Thai	Population	Phu Yai Ban
1.	Ta Prok	ตาปรก	185	Raphiphat Kaewtham
2.	Lak Hin	หลักหิน	741	Nattaphol Bunpheang
3.	West Bak Dong	บักดองตะวันตก	664	Vacant
4.	East Bak Dong	บักดองตะวันออก	399	Prayong Janwijit
5.	Nong Buaren	หนองบัวเรณ	757	Samut Bunrot
6.	Kolor Gae	ตาเส็ด	135	Songsak Rungkham
7.	Tamnak Sai	ตำหนักไทร	1,116	Phet Chaithong
8.	Samrong Kiat	สำโรงเกียรติ	1,115	Chaelom Nilsuk
9.	Samrong Kao	สำโรงเก่า	844	Phet Bunyaphatsorn
10.	Sam Bandai	ซำบันได	23	Adul Sotsi
11.	Pudin Pattana	ภูดินพัฒนา	65	Prachin La-ophong
12.	Nonthum Thawon	โนนตูมถาวร	174	Phawika Wanthongpurit
13.	Santisuk	สันติสุข	74	Luphit Saenphan
14.	Trakul Chai	ตระกูลชัย	513	Pairot In-Boran
15.	Thaptim Siam	ทับทิมสยาม	149	Saisamorn Phabut
16.	Nammut	น้ำมุด	456	Chatri Somnuek
17.	Suan Pa	สวนป่า	267	Sawat In-wanna
18.	Lak Hin Yai	หลักหินใหม่	496	Somsak Bunplot
19.	Kham Charoen	คำเจริญ	41	Phrommi Prasertsin
20.	South Samrong Kiat	สำโรงเกียรติใต้	539	Chalerm Satipan
21.	Samrongmai Thaicharoen	สำโรงใหม่ไทยเจริญ	722	Sali Saha
22.	South Bak Dong	บักดองใต้	488	Saming Rungkham
