= Ba-ngoi Sinae =

Subdistrict in Narathiwat Province

Ba-ngoi Sinae ตำบลบาโงสะโต
- Subdistrict
- Motto: บาโงยซิแน สาธาณูปโภคดี มีเศรษฐกิจชุมชนก้าวไกล เอาใจใส่พัฒนาบุคลากร
- Country: Thailand
- Province: Yala
- District: Yaha

Government
  - Type: Subdistrict Administrative Organization (SAO)
  - Head of SAO: Under election

Population (2026)
  - Total: 6,033
- Time zone: UTC+7 (ICT)

Ba-ngoi Sinae (Thai: ตำบลบาโงยซิแน, pronounced [bˈɑː-əŋɡˈɔ͡ɪ sˈɪniː]) is a tambon (subdistrict) of Yaha District, in Yala province, Thailand. In 2026, it had a population of 6,033 people.

== History ==
The name Ba-ngoi Sinae is from the word โคกข่อย in Kelantan–Pattani Malay. The old name for the subdistrict was Kampong Bunae which means บ้านนา in Thai. The old locals were from Syburi, Kota Bahru and Pattani who formed the subdistrict.

== Administration ==
=== Central administration ===
The tambon is divided into six administrative villages (mubans).

No.	Name	Thai	Population
1.	Tanyong Kalor	ตันหยงกาลอ	1,250
2.	Buke	บูเก๊ะ	1,001
3.	Lima Puero	ลีมาปูโระ	1,049
4.	Pohoe	โปโฮ	683
5.	Siyor	ซีเยาะ	1,032
6.	Lurong	ลูรงค์	1,018
