= Bacho, Bannang Sata =

Subdistrict in Yala Province

Bacho ตำบลบาเจาะ
- Subdistrict
- Motto: ตำบลบาเจาะน่าอยู่ ชุมชนเข้มแข็ง เศรษฐกิจดี ตามวิถีอิสลาม
- Country: Thailand
- Province: Yala
- District: Bannang Sata

Government
  - Type: Subdistrict Administrative Organization (SAO)
  - Head of SAO: Abdul Kodae Alimama

Population (2026)
  - Total: 7,841
- Time zone: UTC+7 (ICT)

Bacho (Thai: ตำบลบาเจาะ, pronounced [bˈɑːkə͡ʊ]) is a tambon (subdistrict) of Bannang Sata District, in Yala province, Thailand. In 2026, it had a population of 7,841 people.

== History ==
The name "Bacho" came from the word "Muecho" means humid land. It became a subdistrict in 1926.

== Administration ==
=== Central administration ===
The tambon is divided into twelve administrative villages (mubans).

No.	Name	Thai	Population
1.	Ubae	อูแบ	1,757
2.	Bacho	บาเจาะ	1,723
3.	Banglang	บางลาง	2,062
4.	Biyo	บียอ	887
5.	Kolor Gae	คอลอกาเอ	1,412
