= Ba-ngo Sato =

Subdistrict in Narathiwat Province

Ba-ngo Sato ตำบลบาโงสะโต
- Subdistrict
- Motto: ตำบลน่าอยู่ อาชีพมั่นคง ชุมชนเข้มแข็ง ปลอดยาเสพติด
- Country: Thailand
- Province: Narathiwat
- District: Ra-ngae

Government
  - Type: Subdistrict Administrative Organization (SAO)
  - Head of SAO: Muhammad Shukri Zufien

Population (2026)
  - Total: 8,797
- Time zone: UTC+7 (ICT)

Ba-ngo Sato (Thai: ตำบลบาโงสะโต, pronounced [bˈɑː-əŋɡˈə͡ʊ sˈɑːtə͡ʊ]) is a tambon (subdistrict) of Ra-ngae District, in Narathiwat province, Thailand. In 2026, it had a population of 8,797 people.

== History ==
The name Ba-ngo Sato is from a hill near the subdistrict named Ba-ngo, which has a lot of Santol. The locals called the area บาโงสะโต which means Santol of Ba-ngo Hills.

== Administration ==
=== Central administration ===
The tambon is divided into eight administrative villages (mubans).

No.	Name	Thai	Population	Phu Yai Ban
1.	Ba-ngo Ta	บาโงตา	1,733	Torhae Tahama
2.	Jekge	เจ๊กเก	1,642	Sumsodeen Buesa
3.	Lubo Bartu	ลูโบ๊ะบาตู	764	Sueran Arong
4.	Zu Artae	ซืออาแต	1,116	Noonsee Musaw
5.	Tra Tae	ตราแดะ	1,719	Hammad Sohki Jelaw
6.	Batu Buesa	บาตูบือซา	597	Maripa Pi
7.	Ba-ngo Sato	บาโงสะโต	689	Gipri Mare
8.	Bayo	บาโย	537	Charee Pawma
