= Ba Yao =

Subdistrict in Sakon Nakhon Province

Coordinates: 17.507499°N 103.978421°E

Ba Yao ตำบลบะยาว
- Subdistrict
- Motto: เทศบาลบะยาวน่าอยู่ ด้วยหลักเศรษฐกิจพอเพียง เคียงคู่บริการสาธารณะ มุ่งพัฒนาการศึกษา ประชาชนเข้มแข็ง ร่วมแรงพัฒนาท้องถิ่น
- Interactive map of Ba Yao
- Country: Thailand
- Province: Udon Thani
- District: Wang Sam Mo

Government
  - Type: Subdistrict Administrative Organization (SAO)
  - Head of SAO: Phankam Inchaiya

Population (2026)
  - Total: 7,752
- Time zone: UTC+7 (ICT)

Ba Yao (Thai: ตำบลบะยาว, pronounced [bˈɑː jˈa͡ʊ]) is a tambon (subdistrict) of Wang Sam Mo District, in Udon Thani province, Thailand. In 2026, it had a population of 7,752 people.

== History ==
Ba Yao became a thesaban on August 16, 2012.

== Administration ==
=== Central administration ===
The tambon is divided into twelve administrative villages (mubans).

No.	Name	Thai	Population
1.	Ba Yao	บะยาว	492
2.	Na Khae	นาแก	709
3.	Na Nok Chum	นานกชุม	930
4.	Na That	นาตาด	653
5.	Khok Sawang	โคกสว่าง	715
6.	Khok Laow	โคกเล้า	883
7.	Na Phrong	นาโปร่ง	977
8.	Dong Ngam Noi	ดงง่ามน้อย	241
9.	Noi Pattana	น้อยพัฒนา	477
10.	Phu Din	ภูดิน	636
11.	Na Chumphon	นาชุมพร	588
12.	Ba Yao	บะยาว	451
