= Ban Wang =

American academic

- Born: 1957 (age 68–69); Xiamen, China
- Occupations: Academic, author

Academic background
- Education: Beijing Foreign Studies University (BA, MA); University of California, Los Angeles (PhD)

Ban Wang (born 1957) is a Chinese-American sinologist. He is the William Haas Professor in Chinese Studies at Stanford University, where he is also a professor of Chinese literature.

== Life ==
Born in Xiamen, Fujian, Wang graduated from Beijing Foreign Studies University with a B.A. in English literature in 1982 and an M.A. in English literature in 1985. He moved to the United States in 1988, and pursued a doctorate in comparative literature at the University of Iowa. He then transferred to University of California, Los Angeles, in 1990, earning a Ph.D. in comparative literature in 1993.

Wang began his academic career in 1993 at the Stony Brook State University of New York, serving as an assistant professor of comparative studies until 1998. He then advanced to the position of associate professor in comparative studies at the same institution from 1998 to 2000. He transferred to Rutgers University, and held a professorship in Asian and comparative literature from 2004 to 2007. Since 2007, he has been a professor of Chinese and comparative literature and holds the William Haas Endowed Chair in Chinese Studies at Stanford University.

== Academics ==
Wang is known for his works on comparative literature and Chinese studies. Among his authored works are his publications in academic journals, including Journal of Modern Chinese Literature as well as books such as The Sublime Figure of History: Aesthetics and Politics in Twentieth-Century and China in the World: Culture, Politics, and World Vision. Wang has held the position of Editor-in-chief for Chinese Literature Series with Palgrave and Brill Presses.

== Works ==
Wang has authored books throughout his career. In 1997, he authored the book The Sublime Figure of History: Aesthetics and Politics in Twentieth-Century. The book offered a cultural history examining the intersection of aesthetics and politics in modern China, exploring how various political projects shape personal and collective identity through aesthetic manifestations across a range of cultural materials and contexts. Richard Krauss, in his review of the book termed the book "stimulating" and said "the book is much more interesting than an account of the Chinese reception of Kant, Hegel, Schiller, and Schopenhauer". His 2002 book Narrative Perspective and Irony in Chinese and American Fiction analyzed how various authors from different cultural backgrounds employ irony as a tool for critical commentary on prevailing social norms and discourses. Through this book, he explored the works of Chinese writers such as Lu Xun, Ah Cheng, and Yu Hua, as well as English writers like Jane Austen, Charles Dickens, and Mark Twain.

In 2004, Wang authored the book Illuminations from the Past: Trauma, Memory, and History in Modern China, offering a cultural analysis of modern China. The book also explored how Chinese intellectuals and artists grapple with trauma, social change, and globalization. Arif Dirlik reviewed the book and said, "Illuminations from the Past is one of the most rewarding books I have ever read on contemporary China in recent years." He further commended the author's effort to challenge historical claims as sources of truth yet acknowledged that the truths from the past are likely the most accurate we have. His 2022 book China in the World: Culture, Politics, and World Vision explored China's modern evolution, examining its national identity in relation to global engagement. The book also discussed the tension between traditional concepts and Western influences, analyzing China's pursuit of unity, equality, and solidarity with Third World nations. The book was reviewed by Julia Keblinska, who said "Wang offers a serious and urgent critique of Chinese Studies and a call to political awareness at a moment when Cold War logics threaten to flatten the nuance and complexity of our field. In accomplishing this task, China in the World is an elegantly efficient volume." More recently in 2023, he authored the book At Home in Nature: Technology, Labor, and Critical Ecology in Modern China. The book examined how anthropocentrism and technoscientific arrogance in modern China have led to ecological crises and human alienation, proposing utopian ideals of non alienated labor as a potential solution for fostering resonance between humans and the Earth.

== Awards and honors ==
- 2000 – Fellowship award, National Endowment for the Humanities
- 2008 – Presidential Award in International Studies, Stanford University

== Bibliography ==
=== Books ===
- The Sublime Figure of History: Aesthetics and Politics in Twentieth-Century (1997) ISBN 9780804728461
- Illuminations from the Past: Trauma, Memory and History in Modern China (2004) ISBN 0804750998
- China in the World: Culture, Politics, and World Vision (2022) ISBN 9781478009801
- At Home in Nature: Technology, Labor, and Critical Ecology in Modern China (2023) ISBN 9781478024729

=== Selected articles ===
- Ban, W. (2011). Human rights, revolutionary legacy, and politics in China. boundary 2, 38(1), 135–163.
- Wang, B. (2012). Geopolitics, Moral Reform, and Poetic Internationalism: Liang Qichao's The Future of New China. Frontiers of Literary Studies in China, 6(1), 2–18.
- Wang, B. (2015). Morality, Aesthetics, and World Literature in Liang Qichao. Chinese Literature Today, 5(1), 85–93.
- Wang, B. (2020). Aesthetics, Morality, and the Modern Community: Wang Guowei, Cai Yuanpei, and Lu Xun. Critical Inquiry, 46(3), 496–514.
- Ban, W. (2022). Ecocriticism in contemporary Chinese science fiction. Comparative Literature in China, (3), 2.
