= Bacho, Bacho =

Subdistrict in Narathiwat Province

Bacho ตำบลบาเจาะ
- Subdistrict
- Motto: การบริหารด้วยหลักธรรมาภิบาล ส่งเสริมประเพณีวัฒนธรรม เสริมสร้างคุณภาพชีวิต คู่เศรษฐกิจก้าวหน้า สังคมสันติสุข สู่ประชาคมอาเซียน
- Country: Thailand
- Province: Narathiwat
- District: Bacho

Government
  - Type: Subdistrict Administrative Organization (SAO)
  - Head of SAO: Inleah Hayimahama

Population (2026)
  - Total: 9,561
- Time zone: UTC+7 (ICT)

Bachoi (Thai: ตำบลบาเจาะ, pronounced [bˈɑːkə͡ʊ]) is a tambon (subdistrict) of Bacho District, in Narathiwat province, Thailand. In 2026, it had a population of 9,561 people.

== History ==
The subdistrict was part of Syburi Province, which was abolished in 1932. While Sai Buri District came to Pattani Province, Bacho was added to Narathiwat. The locals of Bacho used Kelantan–Pattani Malay.

== Administration ==
=== Central administration ===
The tambon is divided into twelve administrative villages (mubans).

No.	Name	Thai	Population
1.	Buejor	บือเจ๊าะ	870
2.	Paebun	แป๊ะบุญ	1,661
3.	Duku	ดูกู	1,787
4.	Satae	สะแต	1,264
5.	Paobor	เปาเบาะ	1,406
6.	Prapa	ประปา	690
7.	Dukusurao	ดูกูสุเหร่า	816
8.	Buejor	บือเจ๊าะ	680
9.	Sopor	ซอปอ	377
