= Ba Hi =

Subdistrict in Sakon Nakhon Province

Coordinates: 17.428829°N 103.892084°E

Ba Hi ตำบลบาฮี
- Subdistrict
- Motto: ดินแดนทุ่งดอกกระเจียว ไข่มดแดง แหล่งอาหารเห็ดป่าธรรมชาติ ดาดดื่นดงผักหวาน ตำนานแห่งพญาเมย
- Interactive map of Ba Hi
- Country: Thailand
- Province: Sakon Nakhon
- District: Phanna Nikhom

Government
  - Type: Subdistrict Administrative Organization (SAO)
  - Head of SAO: Under election

Population (2026)
  - Total: 4,534
- Time zone: UTC+7 (ICT)

Ba Hi (Thai: ตำบลบาฮี, pronounced [baː˧ hiː˧]) is a tambon (subdistrict) of Phanna Nikhom District, in Sakon Nakhon province, Thailand. In 2026, it had a population of 4,534 people.

== History ==
The tambon was formed by the Tai Dam people.

== Geography ==
The area is mostly flat to lowland, averaging 180 meters above sea level. There are natural water sources such as the Huai Pla Hang stream and the Yam stream. There are also numerous ponds scattered throughout the subdistrict, as well as irrigation canals from the electric-powered pumping stations in Tha Song Khon and Ban Na Takang. Most farmers cultivate rice, primarily glutinous rice and non-glutinous rice, and short-cycle crops planted after the rice harvest.

== Economy ==
90% of the locals are farmes. Agricultural land is primarily used for farming, mainly cultivating rice, peanuts, corn, sweet potatoes, watermelons, tomatoes, and fruit trees.

== Administration ==
=== Central administration ===
The tambon is divided into ten administrative villages (mubans).

No.	Name	Thai	Population	Households
1.	Tha Song Khon	ท่าสองคอน	665	298
2.	Ba Hua Mei	บะหัวเมย	574	267
3.	Srang Hin	สร้างหิน	524	224
4.	Na Takang	นาตากาง	532	226
5.	Ba Hi	บะฮี	546	223
6.	Pha Hin	ผาอินทร์	292	110
7.	Lak Chet	หลักเจ็ด	214	122
8.	Ba Hi Nuea	บะฮีเหนือ	427	253
9.	Na Takang Nuea	นาตากางเหนือ	788	241
10.	Ba Hi	บะฮี	259	135
