= Ba Hoi =

Subdistrict in Songkhla Province

Ba Hoi ตำบลบาโหย
- Subdistrict
- Motto: โครงสร้างพื้นฐานพัฒนา รักษาทรัพยากรธรรมชาติ เกษตรกรรมก้าวหน้า พัฒนาสังคม และการศึกษา
- Country: Thailand
- Province: Songkhla
- District: Saba Yoi

Government
  - Type: Subdistrict Administrative Organization (SAO)
  - Head of SAO: Under election

Population (2026)
  - Total: 4,005
- Time zone: UTC+7 (ICT)

Ba Hoi (Thai: ตำบลบาโหย, pronounced [baː˧ hɔj˧]) is a tambon (subdistrict) of Saba Yoi District, in Songkhla province, Thailand. In 2026, it had a population of 4,005 people.

== History ==
Ba Hoi was ruled under Syburi Province. After Syburi was occupied by Malaysia, Most of the locals fled to Songkhla Province.

== Administration ==
=== Central administration ===
The tambon is divided into five administrative villages (mubans).

No.	Name	Thai	Population
1.	Ba Hoi	บาโหย	1,064
2.	Rai Nuea	ไร่เหนือ	889
3.	Lamya	ลำยะ	609
4.	Ae-Lae	แอและ	563
5.	Khlong Taha	คลองตาหา	880
