= Ba-ngoi =

Subdistrict in Yala Province

Ba-ngoi ตำบลบาโงย
- Subdistrict
- Motto: ชุมชนน่าอยู่และมีสุข
- Country: Thailand
- Province: Yala
- District: Raman

Government
  - Type: Subdistrict Administrative Organization (SAO)
  - Head of SAO: Yakariya Chima

Population (2026)
  - Total: 2,281
- Time zone: UTC+7 (ICT)

Ba-ngoi (Thai: ตำบลบาโงย, pronounced [bˈɑː-əŋɡˈɔ͡ɪ]) is a tambon (subdistrict) of Raman District, in Yala province, Thailand. In 2026, it had a population of 2,281 people.

== History ==
The name Ba-ngoi mean a short mountain or hill, which appeared in the middle of the village. The name Ba-ngoi came from a Chinese couple from Pattani came to sell things at Kota Bharu. The couple built a house around the area, the locals of Kota Bharu called that area "Toh Ba-ngo" and then deprived to "Ba-ngoi". It became a thesaban in 1999. The first governor of the subdistrict is Mr.Isma-ae Dengrakina.

== Administration ==
=== Central administration ===
The tambon is divided into twelve administrative villages (mubans).

No.	Name	Thai	Population
1.	Luboe Labi	ลูโบ๊ะลาบี	684
2.	Yue Ro	ยือโร๊ะ	900
3.	Pa-Loe	ปาโละ	304
4.	Ba-ngoi	บาโงย	393
