= Hat Samran district =

Hat Samran หาดสำราญ
- District
- Samran Beach, The Crab Monument
- District location in Trang province
- Coordinates: 7°14′24″N 99°34′36″E
- Country: Thailand
- Province: Trang
- Seat: Hat Samran

Area
  - Total: 224.0 km^{2} (86.5 sq mi)

Population (2021)
  - Total: 16,881
  - Density: 69.4/km^{2} (180/sq mi)
- Time zone: UTC+7 (ICT)
- Postal code: 92120
- Geocode: 9210

Hat Samran (Thai: หาดสำราญ, pronounced [hàːt sǎm.rāːn]) is a district (amphoe) in the southern part of Trang province, Thailand. The district's name means "The Coastline Of Happiness".

== History ==
The minor district (king amphoe) Hat Samran was established on 30 April 1994 by splitting it from Palian district.

In 2007 all 81 minor districts were upgraded to full districts. With publication in the Royal Gazette on 24 August 2007 the upgrade became official.

The communities in this district are mostly settled on the coastline and the land, living together despite religious beliefs (Buddhism, Islam)

== Administration ==
The district is divided into three sub-districts (tambons), which are further subdivided into 22 villages (mubans). There are no municipal (thesaban) areas, and three tambon administrative organizations (TAO).

No.	Name	Thai name	Villages	Pop.
1.	Hat Samran	หาดสำราญ	12	8,725
2.	Ba Wi	บ้าหวี	4	3,382
3.	Tase	ตะเสะ	6	4,764

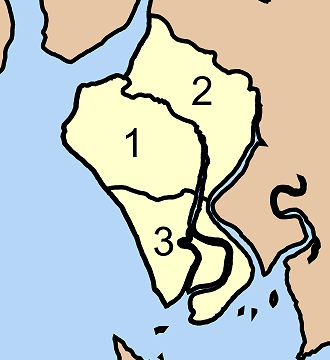

== Tourism ==
Hat Samran District in Trang Province, Thailand, offers several notable tourist attractions for visitors seeking tranquility, nature, and cultural experiences:

- Hat Samran Beach: A peaceful and scenic beach ideal for swimming, picnicking, and relaxation. It is known for its serene atmosphere and clean coastline.
- Wat That Suksamran: A hilltop temple featuring a prominent stupa (chedi) and panoramic views of the surrounding area. It is a popular destination for both spiritual visitors and those seeking scenic vistas.
- Hat Suan Son Roi Pi: Another quiet and picturesque beach, surrounded by lush pine trees. It provides a relaxing environment perfect for unwinding and enjoying the natural landscape.

These destinations make Hat Samran District a distinct experience from the tourist hubs, offering a view of coastal landscapes and cultural sites.
