= Thai Industrial Standard 1099-2548 =

Administrative codes of Thailand

Thai Industry Standard 1099-2548 (short TIS 1099) is a national standard assigning numerical codes to the administrative subdivisions of Thailand, published in 2005 by the Thai Industrial Standards Institute.

== History ==
In 1992, a first version of the TIS 1099 standard (named TIS 1099-2535) was published, assigning codes to each of the then 72 provinces and the capital city of Bangkok. It followed a numbering scheme already used within the Ministry of Interior since the 1980s.

The ISO standard 3199-2, first published in 1998, follows the codes of this standard. The draft version of ISO 3166 was based on the US standard FIPS 10-4, which assigns different numbers to the provinces. Additionally to the codes for the province and Bangkok, the ISO standard adds a special code for the special administrative area Pattaya, a code not present in the Thai standard.

In 2005, the current version of the standard was published, introducing the codes for Amnat Charoen, Nong Bua Lam Phu and Sa Kaeo, created in 1993. It also introduced codes for every district and subdistrict, and some of the municipalities, especially those already existing before the sanitary districts were made into municipalities in 1999.

Since the last publication of the standard, the province Bueng Kan and the district Galyani Vadhana as well as some subdistricts in Bangkok were created. Numerical codes for these entities have been assigned by the Ministry of Interior, which continues to publish regular updates to their code list.

== Structure ==
Every province has a 2 digit numerical code assigned, starting with 10 for Bangkok till 96 for Narathiwat Province. However, not all codes in between are used, some are kept for future use. The first digit designates a region, based on the administrative region as they were in use in the 1950s. The second digit enumerates the provinces within the region. As there are now already 12 provinces in the region 4, the northern Isan, the codes 38 and 39 have been used for the latest provinces in this region.

The districts have a four digit codes, starting with the two digits of the province and the second two digits enumerating the districts within that province. In some cases codes seem to have been omitted, but these actually are the codes of districts which were reassigned to a new province. Also, there were several districts ready to be created in 1998, however the Asian financial crisis put these to halt. Codes for these districts were already assigned. Wiang Kao District created in 2006 then received the code 4029, as 4026 to 4028 were assigned to abandoned district creations. However, when Galyani Vadhana District was created in 2012 it received the code 5025, even though it was in fact one of the abandoned districts of 1997 which would have received the number 5026.

The subdistricts have a six digit code, adding another two digits to the code of the district in which they are located. Again, omitted codes within the enumeration of the subdistrict of one district belong to subdistricts which were reassigned to a different district, usually a newly created district.

The municipalities listed in the standard also have four digit codes like the districts, however starting with 99 and counting down. The provincial capital always has the code ending in 99. For several provinces the number of municipalities is now so high that no longer all can receive a code within the scheme.

While not part of the standard, the Ministry of Interior uses numerical codes for the administrative villages as the lowest subdivision based on the subdistrict codes by adding two digits containing the village number. However, unlike the higher levels of subdivisions, the villages get renumbered if some get reassigned to a different subdistrict, therefore the codes for villages are not stable in time.

=== Examples ===
- Bangkok: 10
- Phra Nakhon District, Bangkok: 1001
- Wat Sam Phraya Subdistrict, Phra Nakhon, Bangkok: 100112
- Chiang Mai Province: 50
- Chiang Mai City: 5099

== See also ==
- ISO 3166-2:TH
- FIPS 10-4
