= Non Sang district =

Non Sang โนนสัง
- District
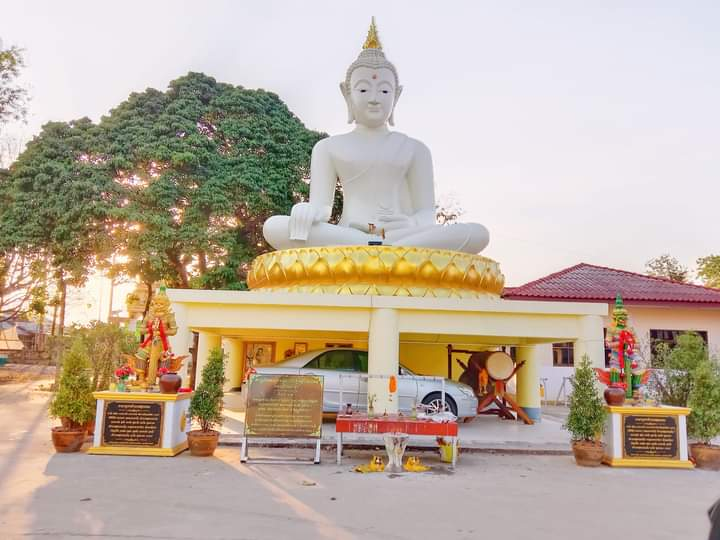
- Wat Suttapradit

- District location in Nong Bua Lamphu province
- Coordinates: 16°51′56″N 102°34′20″E
- Country: Thailand
- Province: Nong Bua Lamphu

Area
  - Total: 577.736 km^{2} (223.065 sq mi)

Population (2005)
  - Total: 64,172
  - Density: 111.1/km^{2} (288/sq mi)
- Time zone: UTC+7 (ICT)
- Postal code: 39140
- Geocode: 3903

Non Sang (Thai: โนนสัง, pronounced [nōːn sǎŋ]; Northeastern Thai: โนนสัง, pronounced [nôːn sǎŋ]) is a district (amphoe) in the southeastern part of Nong Bua Lamphu province, northeastern Thailand.

== Geography ==
Neighbouring districts are (from the west clockwise) Si Bun Rueang and Mueang Nong Bua Lamphu of Nong Bua Lamphu Province, Nong Wua So of Udon Thani province, Khao Suan Kwang, Ubolratana, Phu Wiang, and Nong Na Kham of Khon Kaen province.

== History ==
The area of the district was originally a tambon of Mueang Nong Bua Lam Phu district. On 1 January 1948 it was made a minor district (king amphoe), which was upgraded to a full district on 9 June 1956.

== Administration ==
The district is divided into 10 sub-districts (tambons), which are further subdivided into 104 villages (mubans). There are two sub-district municipalities (thesaban tambons). Non Sang covers tambon Non Sang and Kut Du parts of tambon Kut Du. There are a further nine tambon administrative organizations (TAO).

No.	Name	Thai	Villages	Pop.
1.	Non Sang	โนนสัง	15	8,497
2.	Ban Thin	บ้านถิ่น	9	6,337
3.	Nong Ruea	หนองเรือ	12	9,430
4.	Kut Du	กุดดู่	14	9,774
5.	Ban Kho	บ้านค้อ	10	5,080
6.	Non Mueang	โนนเมือง	7	5,385
7.	Khok Yai	โคกใหญ่	7	3,726
8.	Khok Muang	โคกม่วง	9	6,523
9.	Nikhom Phatthana	นิคมพัฒนา	11	4,253
10.	Pang Ku	ปางกู่	10	5,289
