= Nong Na Kham district =

Nong Na Kham หนองนาคำ
- District
- District location in Khon Kaen province
- Coordinates: 16°48′3″N 102°20′28″E
- Country: Thailand
- Province: Khon Kaen
- Seat: Ban Khok

Area
  - Total: 158.9 km^{2} (61.4 sq mi)

Population (2005)
  - Total: 23,402
  - Density: 147.3/km^{2} (382/sq mi)
- Time zone: UTC+7 (ICT)
- Postal code: 40150
- Geocode: 4023

Nong Na Kham (Thai: หนองนาคำ, pronounced [nɔ̌ːŋ nāː kʰām]) is a district (amphoe) of Khon Kaen province, northeastern Thailand.

== History ==
The minor district (king amphoe) was established on 30 April 1994 by splitting it from Phu Wiang district. It includes Baan Non Nok Tha (th: บ้านโนนนกทา) (E 102°18'17" N 16°47'57"), and Ban Na Di (th: บ้านนาดี) (E 102°18'04" N 16°48'02") Prehistoric Thailand archaeological sites.

On 15 May 2007, all 81 minor districts in Thailand were upgraded to full districts. On 24 August, the upgrade became official.

== Geography ==
Neighboring districts are (from the north clockwise): Si Bun Rueang and Non Sang of Nong Bua Lamphu province; Phu Wiang, Wiang Kao and Si Chomphu of Khon Kaen Province.

== Administration ==
The district is divided into three subdistricts (tambons), which are further subdivided into 34 villages (mubans). There are no municipal (thesabans). There are three tambon administrative organizations (TAO).

No.	Name	Thai name	Villages	Pop.
1.	Kut That	กุดธาตุ	16	11,762
2.	Ban Khok	บ้านโคก	8	4,810
3.	Khanuan	ขนวน	10	6,830
