= Ubolratana district =

Ubolratana อุบลรัตน์
- District
- District location in Khon Kaen province
- Coordinates: 16°45′10″N 102°37′58″E
- Country: Thailand
- Province: Khon Kaen
- Seat: Khuean Ubolratana

Area
  - Total: 487.7 km^{2} (188.3 sq mi)

Population (2005)
  - Total: 43,362
  - Density: 88.9/km^{2} (230/sq mi)
- Time zone: UTC+7 (ICT)
- Postal code: 40250
- Geocode: 4008

Ubolratana (Thai: อุบลรัตน์, RTGS: Ubonrat, pronounced [ʔùʔ.bōn.rát]; Northeastern Thai: อุบลรัตน์, pronounced [ʔǔʔ.bòn.làt]) is a district (amphoe) of Khon Kaen province, northeastern Thailand.

The district is named after Princess Ubol Ratana, the eldest child of King Bhumibol Adulyadej.

== History ==
The minor district (king amphoe) Ubolratana was established on 20 August 1974 by splitting the three tambons, Khok Sung, Na Kham, and Ban Dong from Nam Phong district. It was upgraded to a full district on 25 March 1979.

== Geography ==
Neighboring districts are (from the north clockwise) Khao Suan Kwang, Nam Phong, Mueang Khon Kaen, Ban Fang, Nong Ruea and Phu Wiang of Khon Kaen Province, and Non Sang of Nong Bua Lamphu province.

== Economy ==
The Ubol Ratana Dam is in Khok Sung.

== Administration ==
The district is divided into six sub-districts (tambons), which are further subdivided into 68 villages (mubans). Khuean Ubolratana is a township (thesaban tambon) which covers parts of tambon Khuean Ubolratana. There are a further six tambon administrative organizations (TAO).

No.	Name	Thai name	Villages	Pop.
1.	Khok Sung	โคกสูง	13	8,469
2.	Ban Dong	บ้านดง	14	10,243
3.	Khuean Ubolratana	เขื่อนอุบลรัตน์	10	7,692
4.	Na Kham	นาคำ	13	6,578
5.	Si Suk Samran	ศรีสุขสำราญ	9	5,367
6.	Thung Pong	ทุ่งโป่ง	9	5,013
