= Phu Wiang district =

Phu Wiang ภูเวียง
- District
- District location in Khon Kaen province
- Coordinates: 16°39′16″N 102°22′37″E
- Country: Thailand
- Province: Khon Kaen
- Seat: Phu Wiang

Area
  - Total: 621.6 km^{2} (240.0 sq mi)

Population (2008)
  - Total: 71,597
  - Density: 115.1/km^{2} (298/sq mi)
- Time zone: UTC+7 (ICT)
- Postal code: 40150
- Geocode: 4016

Phu Wiang (Thai: ภูเวียง, pronounced [pʰūː wīaŋ]; Northeastern Thai: ภูเวียง, pronounced [pʰûː wîaŋ]) is a district (amphoe) in the northwestern part of Khon Kaen province, northeastern Thailand.

== Geography ==
Neighboring districts are (from the northeast clockwise): Ubolratana, Nong Ruea, Chum Phae, Wiang Kao, Nong Na Kham of Khon Kaen Province and Non Sang of Nong Bua Lamphu province.

A prehistoric Iron Age archaeological site, None Nok Tha (โนนนกทา) is in the district, as is the Phu Wiang National Park.

The ancient town of Non Nong Khu, in Ban Ruea subdistrict, lies on the plain at about 190 m above sea level. A broken Dvaravati sema stone 83 cm high was found there lying inverted beside a laterite road at the northeastern edge of the town moat, with a sandstone pillar 140 cm high and smaller worked pieces nearby. Vimoltip Singtuen and colleagues matched their stone to the Phu Kradung Formation on which the town stands. They also report that the southwestern part of the Phu Wiang range is presumed to have been a quarry or working place for Dvaravati sema stones, though no quarry has been located.

== Administration ==
The district is divided into 11 subdistricts (tambons), which are further subdivided into 114 villages (mubans). Phu Wiang is a subdistrict municipality (thesaban tambon) and covers parts of tambon Phu Wiang. There are a further 11 tambon administrative organizations (TAO).

No.	Name	Thai	Villages	Pop.
1.	Ban Ruea	บ้านเรือ	9	3,736
4.	Wa Thong	หว้าทอง	8	5,234
5.	Kut Khon Kaen	กุดขอนแก่น	15	9,178
6.	Na Chum Saeng	นาชุมแสง	12	6,568
7.	Na Wa	นาหว้า	11	8,145
10.	Nong Kung Thanasan	หนองกุงธนสาร	16	9,297
12.	Nong Kung Soen	หนองกุงเซิน	9	6,073
13.	Song Pueai	สงเปือย	11	6,467
14.	Thung Chomphu	ทุ่งชมพู	8	4,495
16.	Din Dam	ดินดำ	7	4,691
17.	Phu Wiang	ภูเวียง	8	7,713

Missing numbers are tambons which now form the districts Wiang Kao and Nong Na Kham.
