= Phra That Kham Kaen =

Buddhist reliquary in Khon Kaen Province, Thailand

Coordinates: 16.5635°N 102.9519°E

Phra That Kham Kaen, (Thai: พระธาตุขามแก่น) located at Ban Kham village, Nam Phong District, about 30 kilometers North East of Khon Kaen town in Khon Kaen Province, is a Thai Buddhist chedi. Phra That Kham Kaen is located at Wat Chetiyaphum along (west) Rural Road 4007, north of the village center. Kham Kaen means heartwood of the tamarind tree.

== History of Phra That Kham Kaen, Khon Kaen ==
The Phra That Kham Kaen is an important, revered chedi for the people of Khon Kaen and surrounding provinces because they believe that the chedi will protect their lives and bring peace and success. The 19-meter-high structure is also said to contain a relic of the Buddha — an ancient document. The town of Khon Kaen was named after this chedi. It is also depicted on Khon Kaen's provincial seal and flag.

According to legend, when young monks journeyed to Nakhon Phanom to house holy relics of the Buddha, they passed an old dead tamarind tree trunk on a small prominent hill about 5 km east of the Phong River. They stopped to rest and placed the relics on the dead tree. When, after several days of visiting in Nakhon Phanom, they found that there was not enough room left there for the holy relics, they retraced their journey back to the west. They arrived again at this old tamarind tree stump. With great astonishment, they saw that a new blooming offshoot grew out of the old tree stump. They saw this as a good omen and decided to build a thât (four-sided, curvilinear reliquary stupa) there with the help of local residents. Upon completion, they placed a holy relic within.

There is no actual evidence of the date of the construction of Phra That Kham Kaen. It is believed that the temple was constructed at the same time as Phra That Si Song Rak in Loei Province (in the 17th century) as both share common fundamental structural details, i.e. a low base and golden Lao-style. At this time the area was either part of the seminal Lao Kingdom of Lan Xang or its successors Kingdoms, Vientiane or Champasak. The area was not annexed into the Thai Kingdom until 1828.

== Wat grounds and structures ==
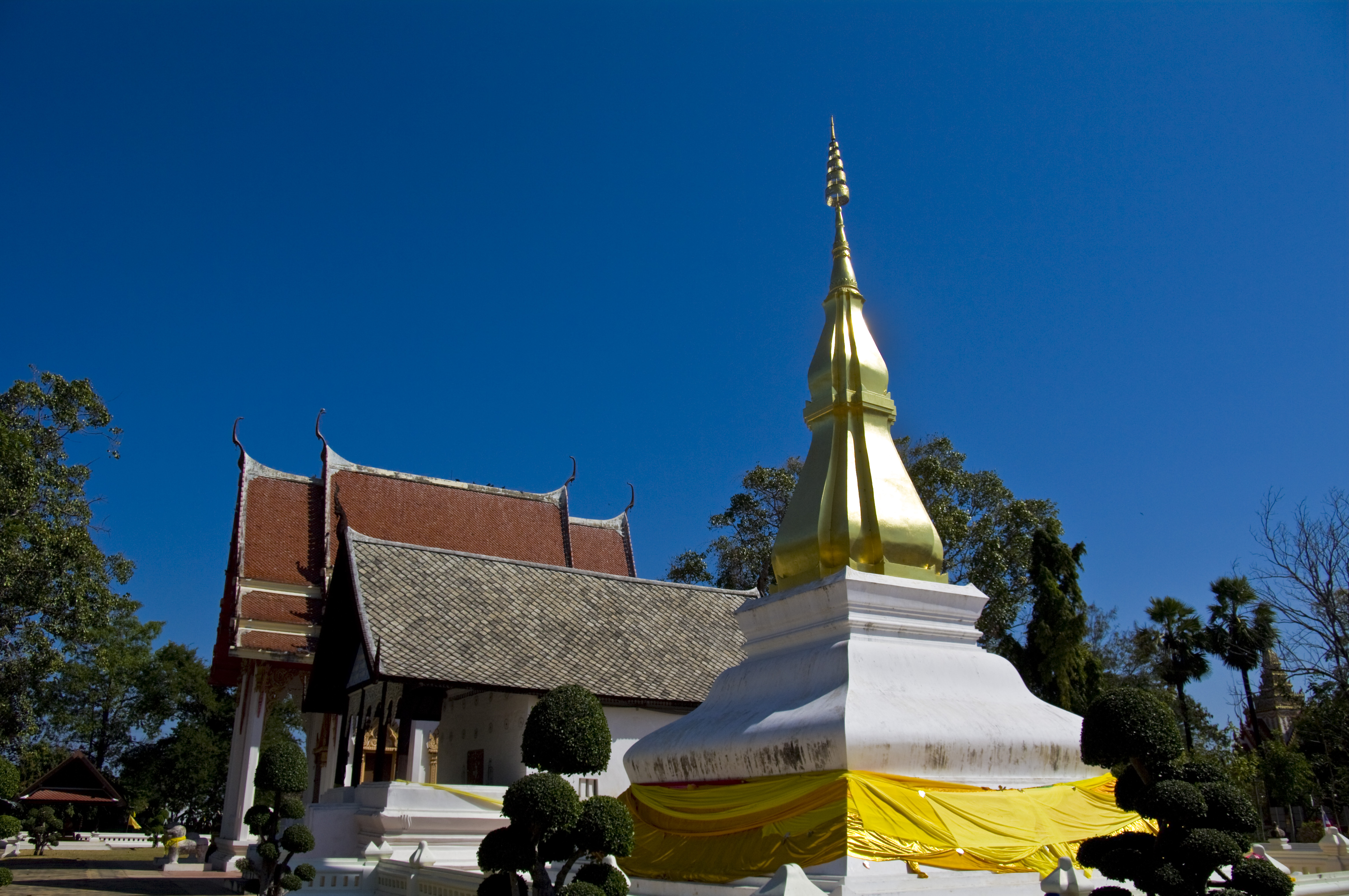
Phra That Kham Kaen

The Phra That Kham Kaen chedi is located on the grounds of the Wat Chetiyaphum temple. Other buildings on the grounds include an ubosot or ordination hall and a viharn or assembly hall, guarded by two white lions. The top ends of the multi-tiered roofs are adorned with typical golden chofa. The ubosot has blue painted gables, and the entrance is flanked by two multi-tiered ceremonial umbrellas.

The Phra That Kham Kaen has recently been renovated and landscaped, and the center of an annual celebration, held on the full moon day of the 6th lunar month. The local residents make merit and pay homage at the chedi. Several cultural and musical performances are held.
