= Si Chomphu district =

Si Chomphu สีชมพู
- District
- District location in Khon Kaen province
- Coordinates: 16°48′1″N 102°11′16″E
- Country: Thailand
- Province: Khon Kaen
- Seat: Wang Phoem

Area
  - Total: 529.041 km^{2} (204.264 sq mi)

Population (2005)
  - Total: 78,220
  - Density: 147.9/km^{2} (383/sq mi)
- Time zone: UTC+7 (ICT)
- Postal code: 40220
- Geocode: 4006

Si Chomphu (Thai: สีชมพู, pronounced [sǐː tɕʰōm.pʰūː]; Northeastern Thai: สีชมพู, pronounced [sǐ sôm.pʰûː]) is a district (amphoe) of Khon Kaen province, northeastern Thailand.

== History ==
The district was established as a minor district (king amphoe) on 1 July 1965, when three tambons, Si Suk, Si Chomphu, and Na Chan were split from Chum Phae district. It was upgraded to a full district on 1 March 1969.

== Geography ==
Neighboring districts are (from the north clockwise): Si Bun Rueang of Nong Bua Lamphu province; Nong Na Kham, Wiang Kao, and Chum Phae of Khon Kaen Province; and Phu Kradueng of Loei province.

== Administration ==
The district is divided into 10 subdistricts (tambons), which are further subdivided into 107 villages (mubans). Si Chomphu is a township (thesaban tambon) and covers parts of tambon Wang Phoem. There are a further 10 tambon administrative organizations (TAO).

No.	Name	Thai name	Villages	Pop.
1.	Si Chomphu	สีชมพู	11	9,039
2.	Si Suk	ศรีสุข	15	11,109
3.	Na Chan	นาจาน	14	10,035
4.	Wang Phoem	วังเพิ่ม	13	11,377
5.	Sam Yang	ซำยาง	6	3,875
6.	Nong Daeng	หนองแดง	10	7,255
7.	Dong Lan	ดงลาน	9	7,691
8.	Boribun	บริบูรณ์	12	7,111
9.	Ban Mai	บ้านใหม่	10	5,619
10.	Phu Han	ภูห่าน	7	5,109

== Attractions ==
- Wat Tham Saeng Tham, Tambon Boribun - A large Buddhist temple complex with a cave system inside the mountain. Inside the main cave has a marble floor. A large building is built on the outside of the mountain and the entrance has a grand gateway.
- Wat Pha Nam Thiang, Tambon Boribun - Another Buddhist temple cave which is singular, large and high. There are free roaming monkeys.
- Phu Wiang National Park, Wiang Kao, Phu Wiang, Si Chomphu and Chum Phae districts - The Park is noted for its dinosaur excavations.
