= Chum Phae district =

Chum Phae ชุมแพ
- District
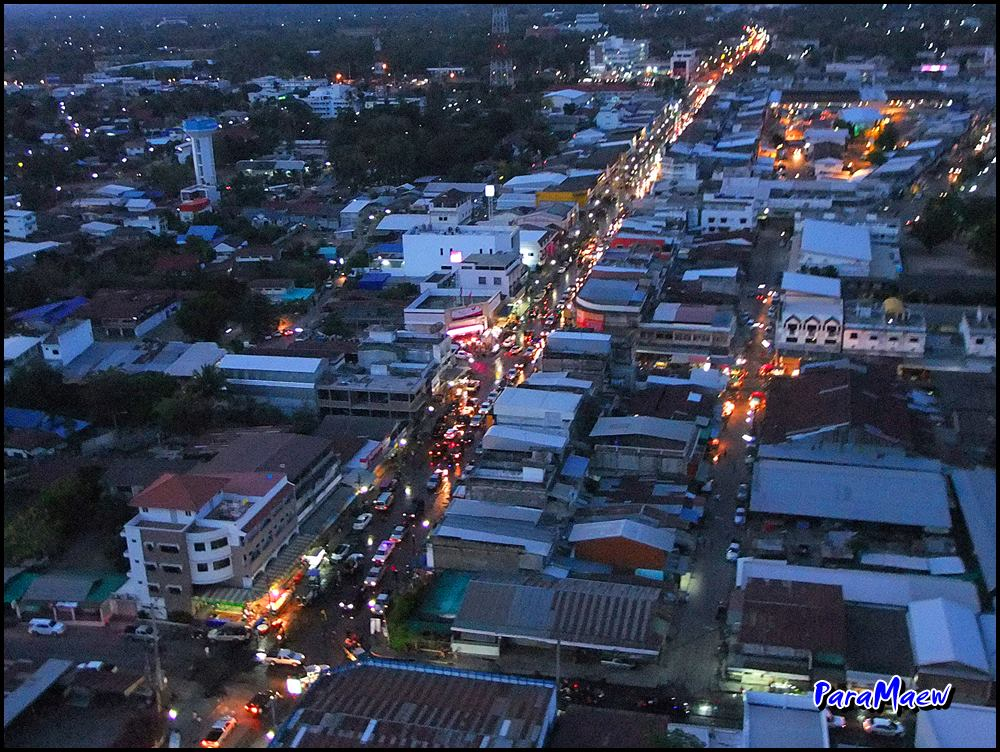
- Aerial view of Chum Phae by night

- District location in Khon Kaen province
- Coordinates: 16°32′39″N 102°5′59″E
- Country: Thailand
- Province: Khon Kaen
- Seat: Chum Phae

Area
  - Total: 510.9 km^{2} (197.3 sq mi)

Population (2005)
  - Total: 122,091
  - Density: 239/km^{2} (620/sq mi)
- Time zone: UTC+7 (ICT)
- Postal code: 40130
- Geocode: 4005

Chum Phae (Thai: ชุมแพ, pronounced [tɕʰūm pʰɛ̄ː]; Northeastern Thai: ชุมแพ, pronounced [sûm pʰɛ̂ː]) is a district of Khon Kaen province, northeastern Thailand.

== History ==
The area has been occupied since prehistoric times. The ruins of the town Non Mueang date from the Dvaravati period. At Tham Phra Kho Khat, in Nong Phai subdistrict at the foot of the Phu Wiang range, an unfinished sema stone 25 cm wide, 70 cm high and 5 cm thick was found lying on the ground surface. Its pale grey sandstone is more than nine tenths quartz and matches the Phra Wihan Formation, which is exposed in a cross-bedded cliff beside the site and carries thin veins of iron oxide. Vimoltip Singtuen and colleagues assign the site to the Dvaravati period, following an earlier Fine Arts Department survey.

The establishment of the district was announced in the Royal Gazette on 3 August 1943, originally including tambons Chum Phae, Si Suk, Non Han, and Khua Riang, which were later divided into 10 tambons.

In 1965 the northeastern part of the district was split off to form Si Chomphu district. In 1981 the western portion of the district formed the district Phu Pha Man district.

== Geography ==
Neighboring districts are (from the north clockwise): Phu Kradueng of Loei province; Si Chomphu, Wiang Kao, Phu Wiang and Nong Ruea of Khon Kaen Province; Ban Thaen, Phu Khiao, and Khon San of Chaiyaphum province; and Phu Pha Man of Khon Kaen.

== Administration ==
The district is divided into 12 subdistricts (tambons), which are further subdivided into 142 villages (mubans). Chum Phae is a town (thesaban mueang) which covers parts of tambons Chum Phae, Nong Pai, and Chai So. There are two townships (thesaban tambon): Non Han covers parts of tambons Non Han and Non Sa-at, and Khok Sung Sam Phanat covers parts of tambons Non Udom and Khua Riang. There are a further 12 tambon administrative organizations (TAO).

No.	Name	Thai name	Villages	Pop.
1.	Chum Phae	ชุมแพ	17	22,070
2.	Non Han	โนนหัน	10	6,599
3.	Na Nong Thum	นาหนองทุ่ม	12	8,840
4.	Non Udom	โนนอุดม	11	6,829
5.	Khua Riang	ขัวเรียง	12	8,651
6.	Nong Phai	หนองไผ่	19	20,643
7.	Chai So	ไชยสอ	10	9,527
8.	Wang Hin Lat	วังหินลาด	11	8,388
9.	Na Phiang	นาเพียง	14	8,865
10.	Nong Khiat	หนองเขียด	10	6,480
11.	Nong Sao Lao	หนองเสาเล้า	10	6,534
12.	Non Sa-at	โนนสะอาด	9	8,665

== Pop culture ==
Chum Phae served as the setting for the 1976 Thai action film Chum Phae by Philip Chalong.
