= Nong Ruea district =

Nong Ruea หนองเรือ
- District
- District location in Khon Kaen province
- Coordinates: 16°29′36″N 102°26′0″E
- Country: Thailand
- Province: Khon Kaen

Area
  - Total: 673.8 km^{2} (260.2 sq mi)

Population (2005)
  - Total: 91,956
  - Density: 136.5/km^{2} (354/sq mi)
- Time zone: UTC+7 (ICT)
- Postal code: 40210
- Geocode: 4004

Nong Ruea (Thai: หนองเรือ, pronounced [nɔ̌ːŋ rɯ̄a]; Northeastern Thai: หนองเฮือ, pronounced [nɔ̌ːŋ hɯ̂a]) is a district (amphoe) of Khon Kaen province, northeastern Thailand.

== History ==
The minor district (king amphoe) Nong Ruea was established in 1959 by splitting it from Mueang Khon Kaen district. On 31 January 1963, it was upgraded to a full district.

== Geography ==
Neighboring districts are (from the west clockwise): Chum Phae, Phu Wiang, Ubolratana, Ban Fang, and Mancha Khiri of Khon Kaen Province, and Ban Thaen of Chaiyaphum province.

== Administration ==
The district is divided into 10 subdistricts (tambons), which are further subdivided into 149 villages (mubans). There are three townships (thesaban tambons): Nong Ruea covers parts of tambons Nong Ruea and Nong Kae, parts of tambons Kut Kwang, Non Sa-at, and Dom Mong, and parts of Bang Kong and Chorakhe. There are a further 10 tambon administrative organizations (TAO).

No.	Name	Thai name	Villages	Pop.
1.	Nong Ruea	หนองเรือ	13	10,996
2.	Ban Meng	บ้านเม็ง	18	11,908
3.	Ban Kong	บ้านกง	10	6,730
4.	Yang Kham	ยางคำ	14	9,343
5.	Chorakhe	จระเข้	13	7,878
6.	Non Thong	โนนทอง	21	11,850
7.	Kut Kwang	กุดกว้าง	21	9,619
8.	Non Than	โนนทัน	14	8,867
9.	Non Sa-at	โนนสะอาด	15	8,974
10.	Ban Phue	บ้านผือ	10	5,791

== Economy ==
Two major factories can be found in the Nong Reua District: the Mitr Phu Viang sugar refinery, and the Khon Kaen Fishing Net Co. Ltd. factory.
