= Phu Pha Man district =

Phu Pha Man ภูผาม่าน
- District
- District location in Khon Kaen province
- Coordinates: 16°38′42″N 101°54′14″E
- Country: Thailand
- Province: Khon Kaen
- Seat: Phu Pha Man

Area
  - Total: 284.6 km^{2} (109.9 sq mi)

Population (2005)
  - Total: 22,229
  - Density: 78.1/km^{2} (202/sq mi)
- Time zone: UTC+7 (ICT)
- Postal code: 40350
- Geocode: 4020

Phu Pha Man (Thai: ภูผาม่าน, pronounced [pʰūː pʰǎː mâːn]; Northeastern Thai: ภูผาม่าน, pronounced [pʰûː pʰǎː māːn]) is the northwesternmost district (amphoe) of Khon Kaen province, northeastern Thailand.

== History ==
The district was established as a minor district (king amphoe) on 15 July 1981 with the two tambons Non Don and Na Fai split off from Chum Phae district. The administration started operation on 1 September 1981, and on 1 October 1981 the district office building was opened. On 4 July 1994 the minor district was upgraded to a full district.

== Geography ==
Neighboring districts are (from the north clockwise): Phu Kradueng of Loei province; Chum Phae of Khon Kaen Province; Khon San of Chaiyaphum province; and Nam Nao of Phetchabun province.

== Administration ==
The district is divided into five subdistricts (tambons), which are further subdivided into 41 villages (mubans). Phu Pha Man is a township (thesaban tambon) which covers parts of tambons Phu Pha Man and Non Dong. There are a further five tambon administrative organizations (TAO).

No.	Name	Thai name	Villages	Pop.
1.	Non Khom	โนนคอม	8	4,111
2.	Na Fai	นาฝาย	6	2,591
3.	Phu Pha Man	ภูผาม่าน	9	4,767
4.	Wang Suap	วังสวาบ	10	3,900
5.	Huai Muang	ห้วยม่วง	8	6,860
