= Ban Thaen district =

Ban Thaen บ้านแท่น
- District
- District location in Chaiyaphum province
- Coordinates: 16°24′18″N 102°20′31″E
- Country: Thailand
- Province: Chaiyaphum
- Seat: Ban Thaen

Area
  - Total: 308.707 km^{2} (119.192 sq mi)

Population (2000)
  - Total: 43,992
  - Density: 142.5/km^{2} (369/sq mi)
- Time zone: UTC+7 (ICT)
- Postal code: 36190
- Geocode: 3611

Ban Thaen (Thai: บ้านแท่น, pronounced [bâːn tʰɛ̂n]) is the northeasternmost district (amphoe) of Chaiyaphum province, northeastern Thailand.

== History ==
Tambon Sam Suan, Ban Tao, and Ban Thaen were separated from Phu Khiao District to create Ban Thaen minor district (king amphoe) on 16 June 1965. It was upgraded to a full district on 25 February 1969.

== Geography ==
Neighboring districts are (from the southwest clockwise): Kaeng Khro and Phu Khiao of Chaiyaphum Province; Nong Ruea and Mancha Khiri of Khon Kaen province.

== Administration ==
The district is divided into five subdistricts (tambons), which are further subdivided into 66 villages (mubans). The township (thesaban tambon) Ban Thaen covers parts of tambon Ban Thaen. There are a further five tambon administrative organizations (TAO).

1.	Ban Thaen	บ้านแท่น
2.	Sam Suan	สามสวน
3.	Sa Phang	สระพัง
4.	Ban Tao	บ้านเต่า
5.	Nong Khu	หนองคู
