= Nam Phong district =

Nam Phong น้ำพอง
- District
- District location in Khon Kaen province
- Coordinates: 16°42′7″N 102°51′24″E
- Country: Thailand
- Province: Khon Kaen
- Seat: Wang Chai

Area
  - Total: 828.7 km^{2} (320.0 sq mi)

Population (2008)
  - Total: 112,414
  - Density: 136.8/km^{2} (354/sq mi)
- Time zone: UTC+7 (ICT)
- Postal code: 40140
- Geocode: 4007

Nam Phong (Thai: น้ำพอง, pronounced [náːm pʰɔ̄ːŋ]; Northeastern Thai: น้ำพอง, pronounced [nȁːm pʰɔ̂ːŋ]) is a district (amphoe) of Khon Kaen province in Thailand.

== Geography ==
The Nam Phong district is surrounded by Non Sa-at (in the Udon Thani province), Kranuan, Sam Sung, Mueang Khon Kaen, Ubolratana, and Khao Suan Kwang.

The district is located along Mittraphap Road (Thailand Route 2) and the Northeastern Railway. The district office and the train station are about 7 km east of the main settlement, Ban Nam Phong.

Despite its name, Nam Phong National Park does not occupy any of Nam Phong District, but is located farther southeast. Both are named after the Nam Phong River, which originates in the national park (and after the Ubol Ratana Dam flows through the district towards the Chi River).

== Economy ==
The district is mostly agricultural, its main activities being rice and sugar cane growing and animal husbandry. The two major factories are a sugar factory and a distillery for lao kao (white spirits).

An oil survey in 1979 found a natural gas reserve of an estimated 1.5 trillion cubic feet (42 km^{3}). Since 1989 the gas field has been exploited for the Nam Phong power plant operated by EGAT. With a capacity of 710 MW, it is the main source of electricity for northeast Thailand.

== History ==
The district was created on 10 February 1908, at first named Tha Wa (ท่าหว้า). In 1909 it was renamed to Nam Phong.

From 1972 to 1973, the Royal Thai Air Base Nam Phong was a U.S. military facility used in the Vietnam War.

== Attractions ==
Phrathat Kham Kaen is an ancient Buddhist monument. The stupa at Wat Chetiyaphum is believed to mark the original site of Khon Kaen. According to local legend, relics of Buddha were to be brought to Nakhon Phanom. The monks camped at a dead tamarind tree. When they arrived in Nakhon Phanom the Phrathat Phanom was already finished, thus they planned to return the relics. On the return way they found the dead tree flourishing again, and built the stupa at the site of the miracle.

Ban Khok Sa-nga is famous as the King Cobra Village. In 1951 a local doctor started to conduct cobra shows to attract clients to the village. Now the cobra shows are the main income of the villagers, who also travel around to perform the show and sell herbal medicine.

== Administration ==
The district is divided into 12 sub-districts (tambons), which are further subdivided into 167 villages (mubans). There are two sub-district municipalities (thesaban tambons): Nam Phong covering parts of tambon Nam Phong, and Wang Chai covering parts of tambons Wang Chai and Nong Kung. Each of the tambons is administered by a tambon administrative organization (TAO).

| No. | Name | Thai | Villages | Pop. |
|---|---|---|---|---|
| 1. | Nam Phong | น้ำพอง | 17 | 14,081 |
| 2. | Wang Chai | วังชัย | 16 | 10,494 |
| 3. | Nong Kung | หนองกุง | 10 | 9,915 |
| 4. | Bua Yai | บัวใหญ่ | 17 | 7,797 |
| 5. | Sa-at | สะอาด | 14 | 9,657 |
| 6. | Muang Wan | ม่วงหวาน | 14 | 9,385 |
| 7. | Ban Kham | บ้านขาม | 16 | 9,281 |
| 8. | Bua Ngoen | บัวเงิน | 17 | 12,095 |
| 9. | Sai Mun | ทรายมูล | 13 | 7,333 |
| 10. | Tha Krasoem | ท่ากระเสริม | 10 | 7,500 |
| 11. | Phang Thui | พังทุย | 13 | 7,137 |
| 12. | Kut Nam Sai | กุดน้ำใส | 10 | 7,739 |
