= Ubol Ratana Dam =

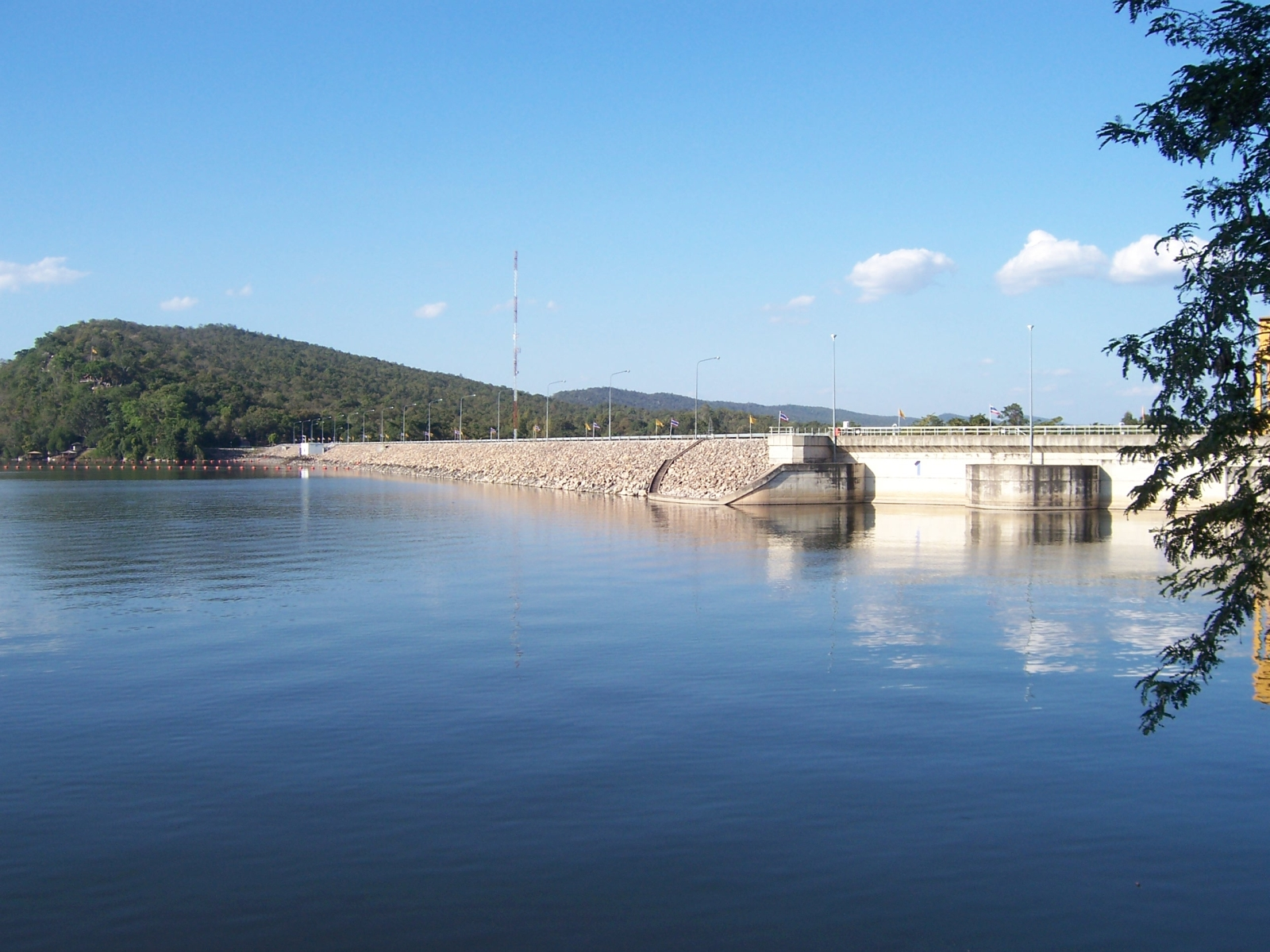
- Upstream side of dam

- Location within Thailand
- Official name: Ubol Ratana Dam
- Country: Thailand
- Location: Ubolratana, Khon Kaen
- Coordinates: 16°46′31.42″N 102°37′5.97″E
- Opening date: 1966
- Owner: Electricity Generating Authority of Thailand

Dam and spillways
- Type of dam: Earth core rock-fill dam
- Impounds: Phong River
- Height: 32 m (105 ft)
- Length: 885 m (2,904 ft)

Reservoir
- Creates: Ubol Ratana Reservoir
- Total capacity: 2,263,000 m^{3} (79,900,000 ft^{3})
- Catchment area: 12,104 km^{2} (4,673 mi^{2})

Power Station
- Operator: Electricity Generating Authority of Thailand
- Turbines: 3 x 8.4 MW Kaplan-type
- Installed capacity: 25.2 MW
- Annual generation: 57 GWh

The Ubol Ratana Dam (pronounced: Ubon Rat), formerly known as the "Phong Neeb Dam", is a multi-purpose dam in tambon Khok Sung, Ubolratana district, approximately 50 km (31 mi) north of Khon Kaen, Khon Kaen province, Thailand. It was the first hydroelectric power project developed in Thailand's northeastern area of Isan. The dam impounds the Nam Phong, which flows into the Chi River and thence to the Mun River, a tributary of the Mekong River. The dam was given its current name by royal permission in 1966, in honour of princess Ubol Ratana, the eldest child of King Bhumibol Adulyadej.

== Description ==
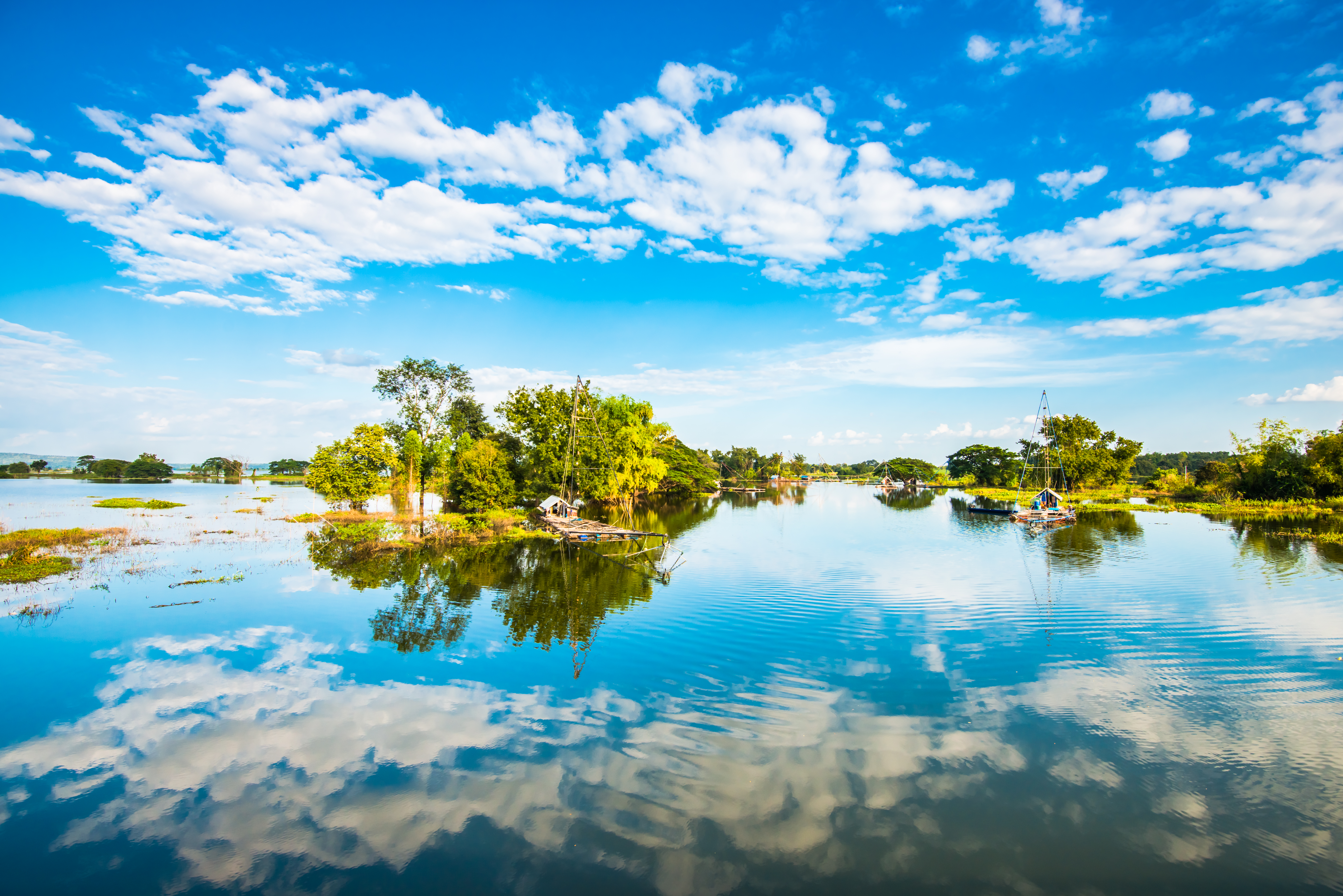
The reservoir inside Nam Phong National Park

The dam is multi-purpose: electricity generation, irrigation, flood control, transportation, fisheries, and as tourist attraction. It is an earth core rockfill dam, constructed in 1964. Its crest length is 885 m (2,904 ft), and 32 m (105 ft) high. Its catchment area is 12,104 km^{2} (4,673 mi^{2}). Its reservoir has a maximum storage capacity of 2,263,000 m^{3} (79,900,000 ft^{3}).

The dam is managed by the Electricity Generating Authority of Thailand (EGAT).

Thirty thousand people were resettled to make way for the large reservoir accompanying the dam. This resettlement resulted in a sharp decrease in forested areas in the catchment areas and an increase in erosion.

In 1984, the dam was modified to reinforce dam safety and to ensure better flood protection.

In 2024, a 24 MW floating solar PV array of approximately 48,000 panels was added. Electricity generation during sunlight hours is now typically solar powered, while hydro electric generation can be reserved primarily at night. Additionally, a 6 MWh BESS (Battery Electric Storage System) was added to provide power when switching between the two sources of generation.

== Power plant ==
The power plant at the dam has three turbines, each with an installed capacity of 8,400 KW. The dam generates an average of 57 GWh a year. The operation of the turbines commenced on 4 February 1966, 14 March 1969, and 12 June 1968 respectively.

== History ==
In April 2016 the dam ran dry for the first time since its construction. With no usable storage it cannot provide irrigation water, cannot generate electricity, and its fish population is dying. Its usable storage stands at minus 3.95 percent (as of (2016-04-04).

Ubol Ratana Dam is the first of the royal dams to run dry. The other royal dams are:

- Bhumibol Dam: opened in 1964 in the north on the Ping River. Capacity: 13,462,000,000 m^{3}.
- Sirindhorn Dam: opened in 1971 in the northeast on the Lam Dom Noi River. Capacity: 1,966,000,000 m^{3}
- Chulabhorn Dam: opened in 1972 in the northeast on the Phrong River. Capacity: 165,000,000 m^{3}
- Sirikit Dam: opened in 1974 in the north on the Nan River. Capacity: 9,510,000,000 m^{3}
- Srinagarind Dam: opened in 1980 in the west on the Khwae Yai River. Capacity: 17,745,000,000 m^{3}
- Vajiralongkorn Dam: opened in 1984 in the west on the Khwae Noi River. Capacity: 8,100,000 m^{3}

Due to the ongoing drought, the royal dams are heavily stressed. According to the Hydro and Agro Informatics Institute, as of 3 April 2016, sixteen Thai dams are at critically low levels of usable reservoir storage. Of the other royal dams, Bhumibol Dam is at four percent, Sirindhorn Dam is at 10 percent, Srinagarind Dam is at 11 percent, Sirikit Dam is at 12 percent, Chulabhorn Dam is at 13 percent, and Vajiralongkorn Dam is at 14 percent.

== See also ==
- Mekong River Basin Hydropower
- Mekong River Commission
- Electricity Generating Authority of Thailand
