= Wiang Kao district =

Wiang Kao เวียงเก่า
- District
- District location in Khon Kaen province
- Coordinates: 16°40′43″N 102°17′40″E
- Country: Thailand
- Province: Khon Kaen
- Seat: Nai Mueang

Area
  - Total: 286.0 km^{2} (110.4 sq mi)

Population (2005)
  - Total: 19,750
  - Density: 69.1/km^{2} (179/sq mi)
- Time zone: UTC+7 (ICT)
- Postal code: 40140
- Geocode: 4029

Wiang Kao (Thai: เวียงเก่า, pronounced [wīaŋ kàw]; Northeastern Thai: เวียงเก่า, pronounced [wîaŋ káw]) is a district (amphoe) of Khon Kaen province, northeastern Thailand.

== History ==
The major district (king amphoe) was created by splitting three tambons from Phu Wiang district. Its creation became effective on 1 May 2006.

On 15 May 2007, all 81 minor districts were upgraded to full districts. With publication in the Royal Gazette on 24 August the upgrade became official.

== Geography ==
Neighboring districts are (from the north clockwise) Nong Na Kham, Phu Wiang, Chum Phae, and Si Chomphu.

The district is in the Phu Wiang Mountains, parts of it in Phu Wiang National Park. In 1976 dinosaur fossils were discovered in the district. Since 2001 the discovery sites are accessible in the Phu Wiang Dinosaur Museum.

== Administration ==
The district is divided into three sub-districts (tambons), which are further subdivided into 36 villages (mubans). There are no municipal (thesaban) areas, and a further three ambon administrative organizations (TAO).

No.	Name	Thai name	Villages	Pop.
1.	Nai Mueang	ในเมือง	15	8,957
2.	Mueang Kao Phatthana	เมืองเก่าพัฒนา	10	5,857
3.	Khao Noi	เขาน้อย	11	4,936
