= Khon Kaen province =

Coordinates: 16°26′41″N 102°50′1″E

Khon Kaen ขอนแก่น
- Province
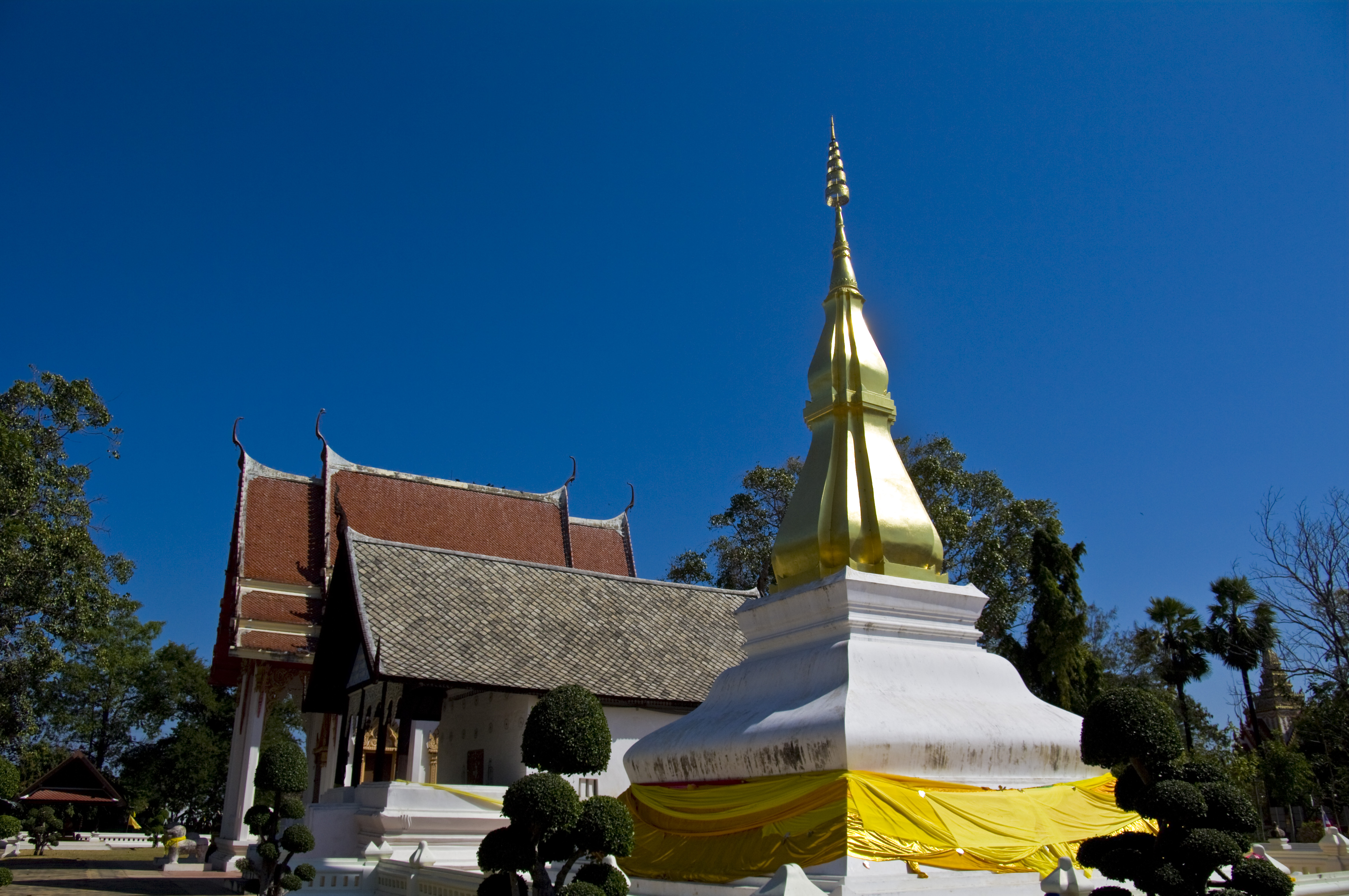
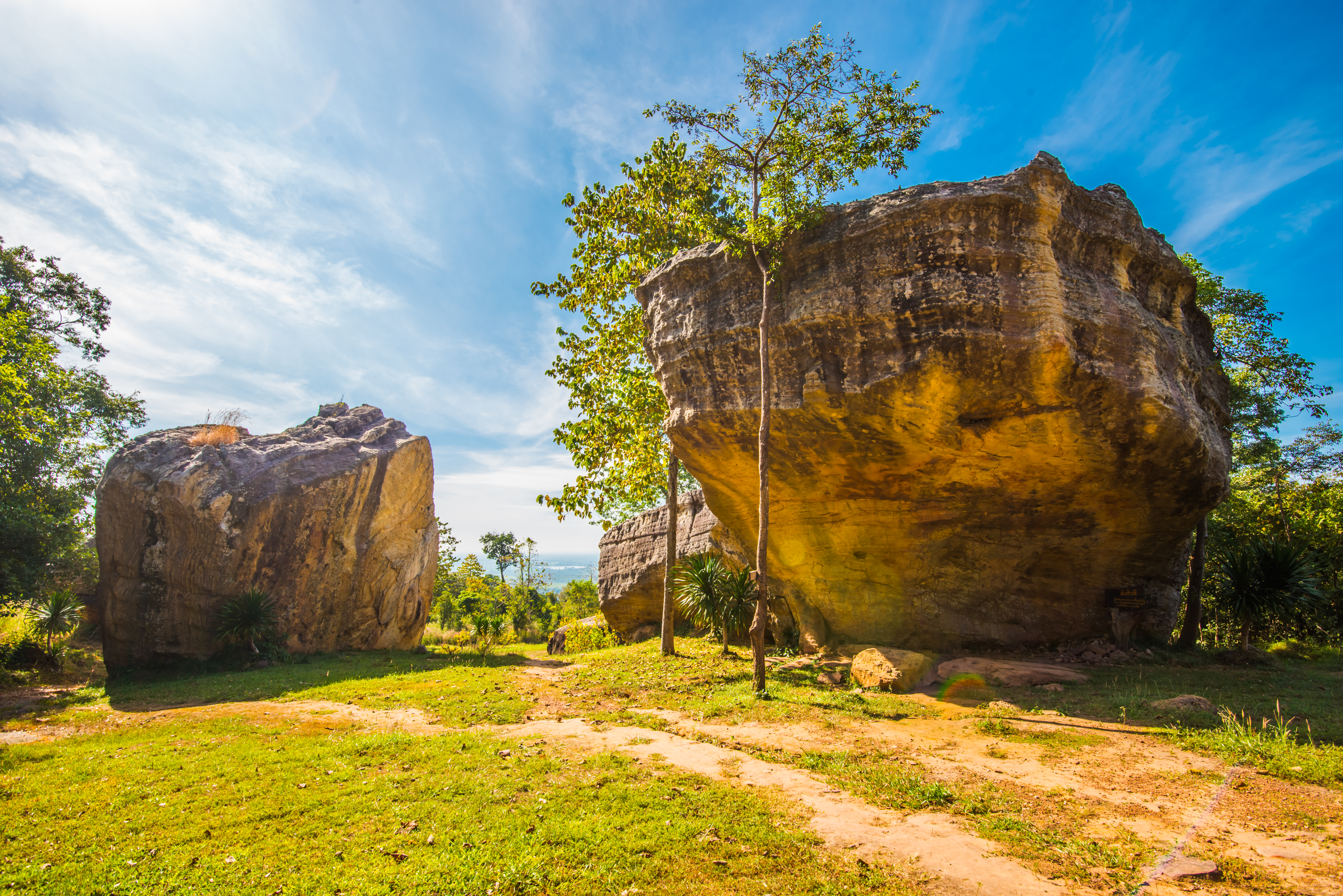
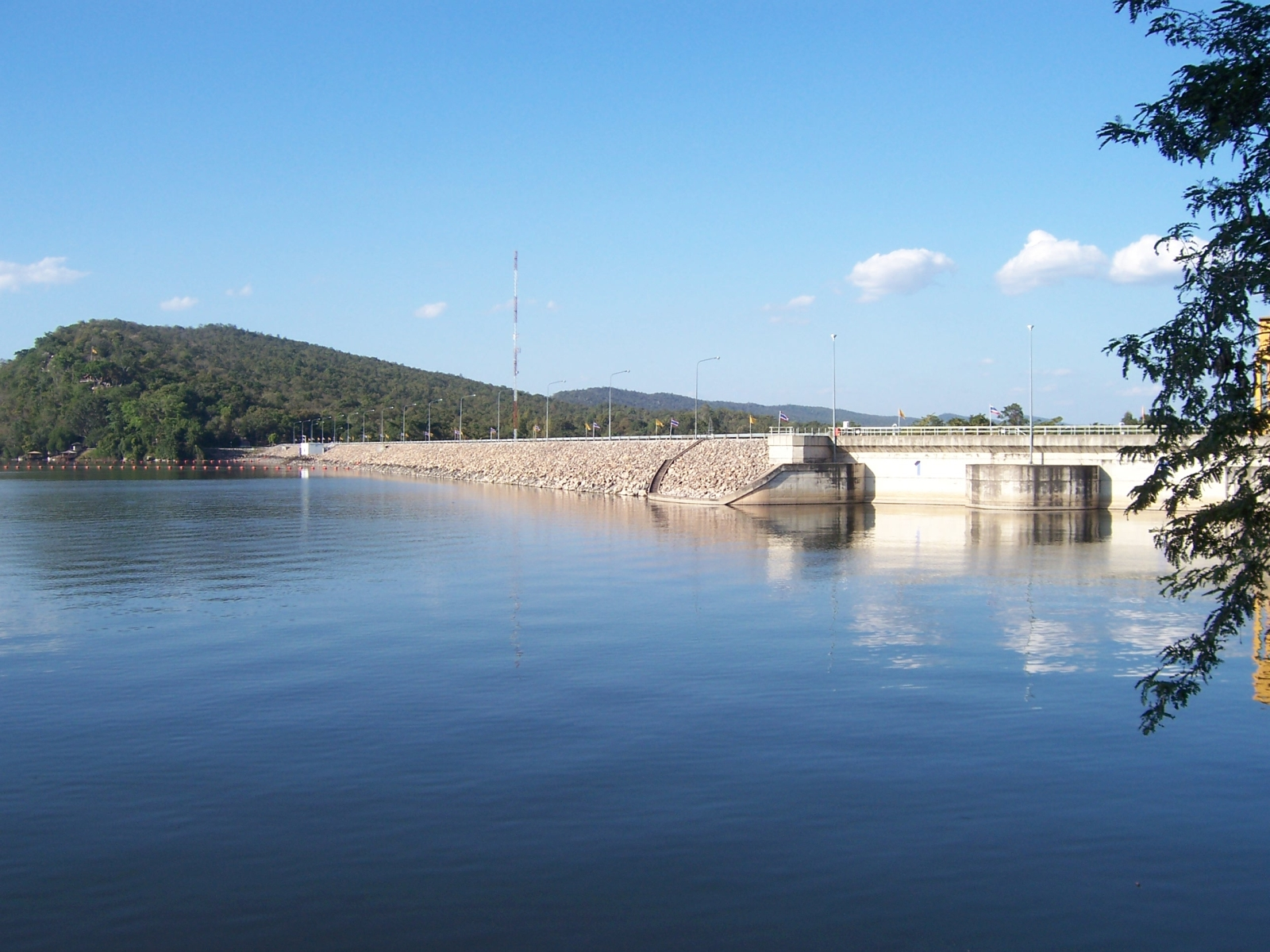
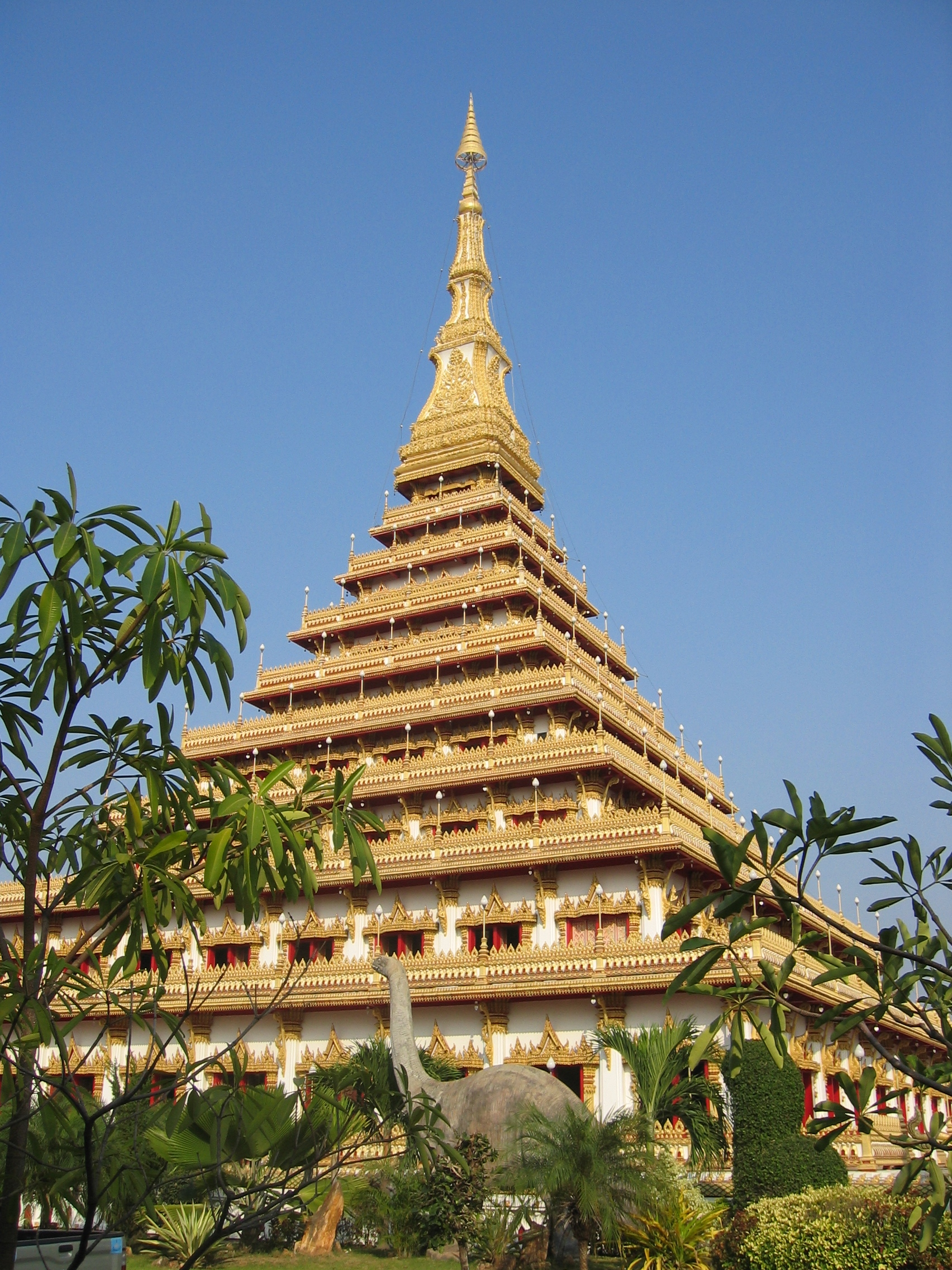
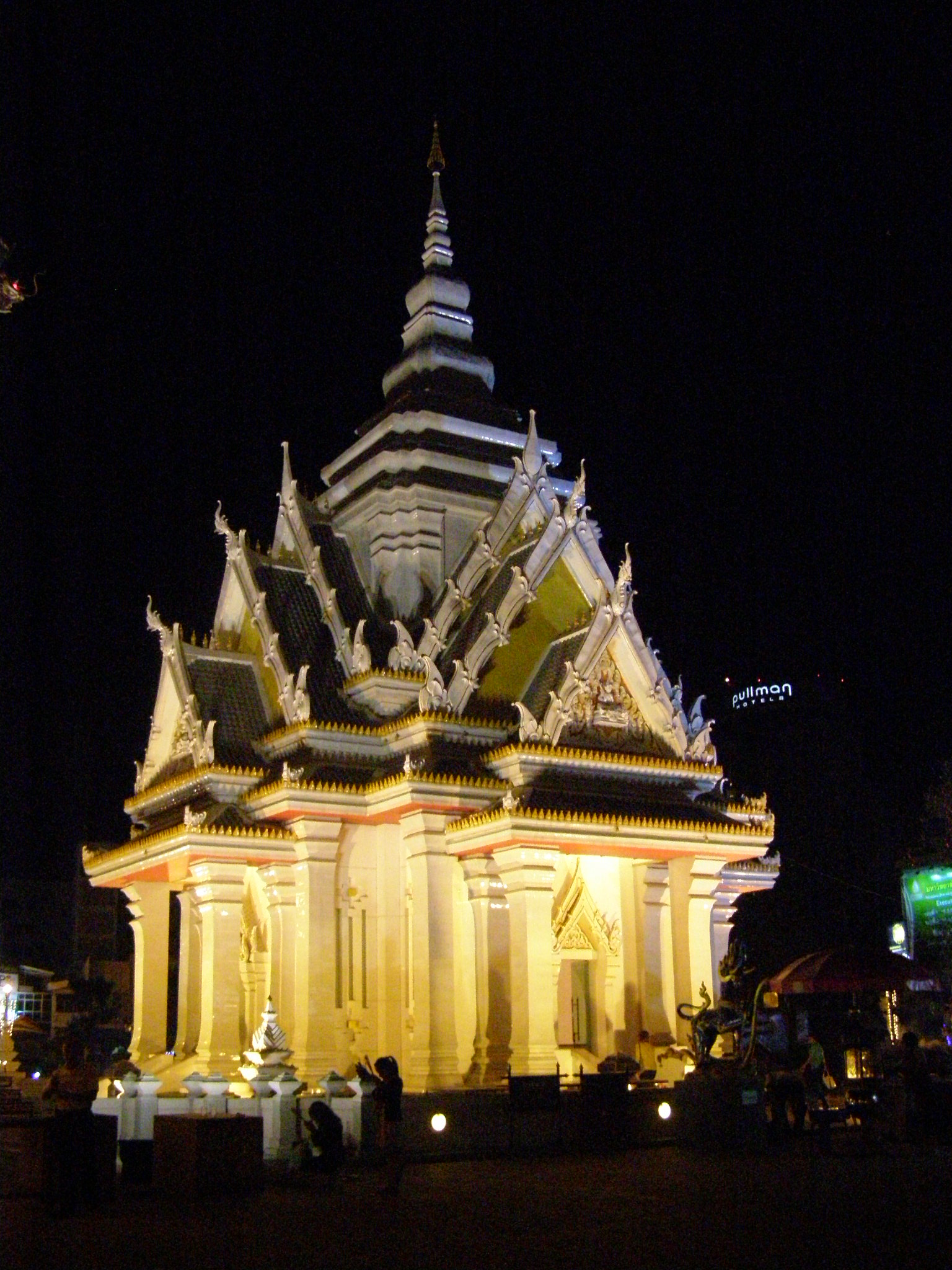
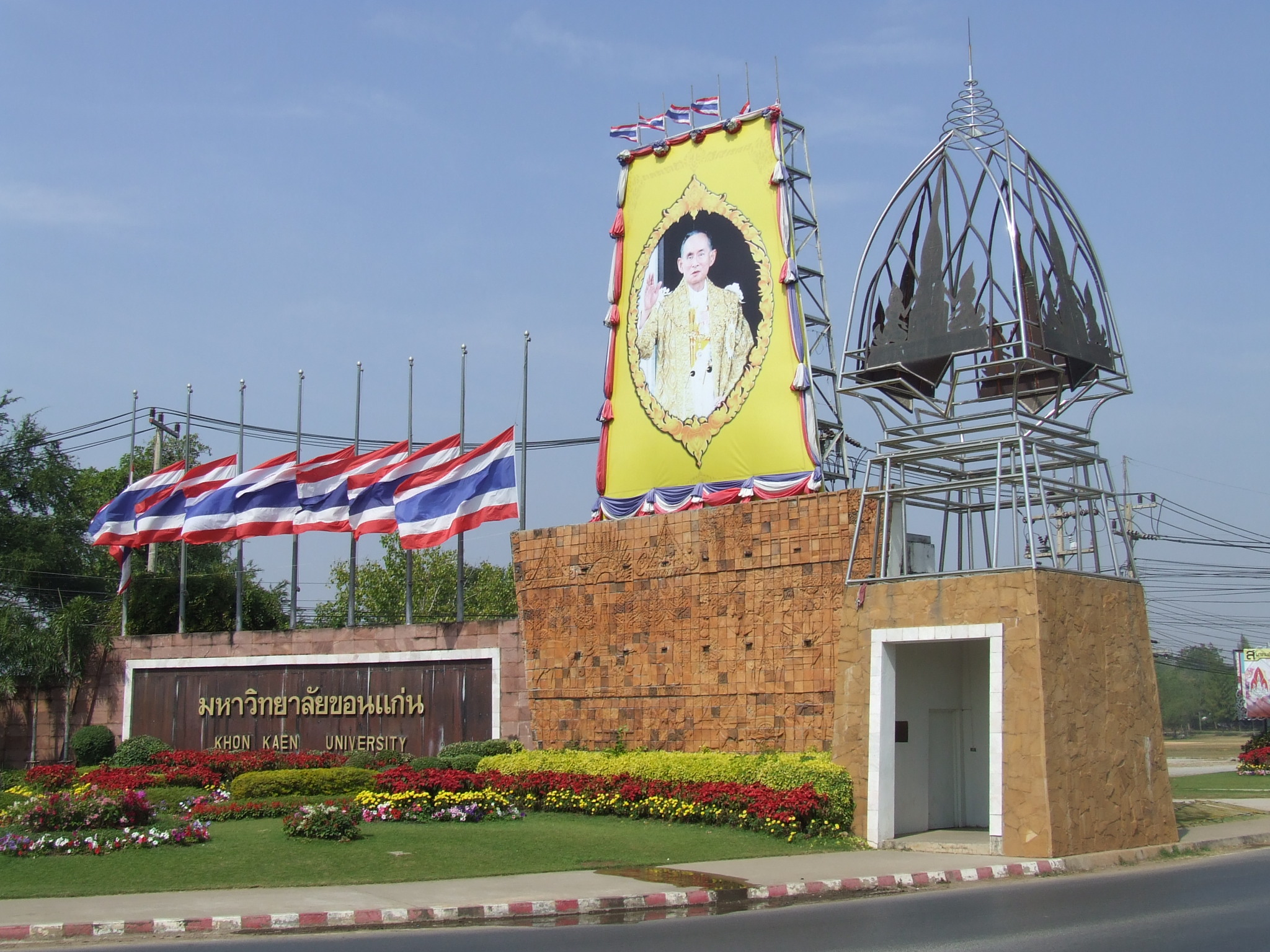
- From left to right, top to bottom : Phra That Kham Kaen, Nam Phong National Park, Ubol Ratana Dam, Phra Mahathat Kaen Nakhon, Khon Kaen City Pillar Shrine, Khon Kaen University

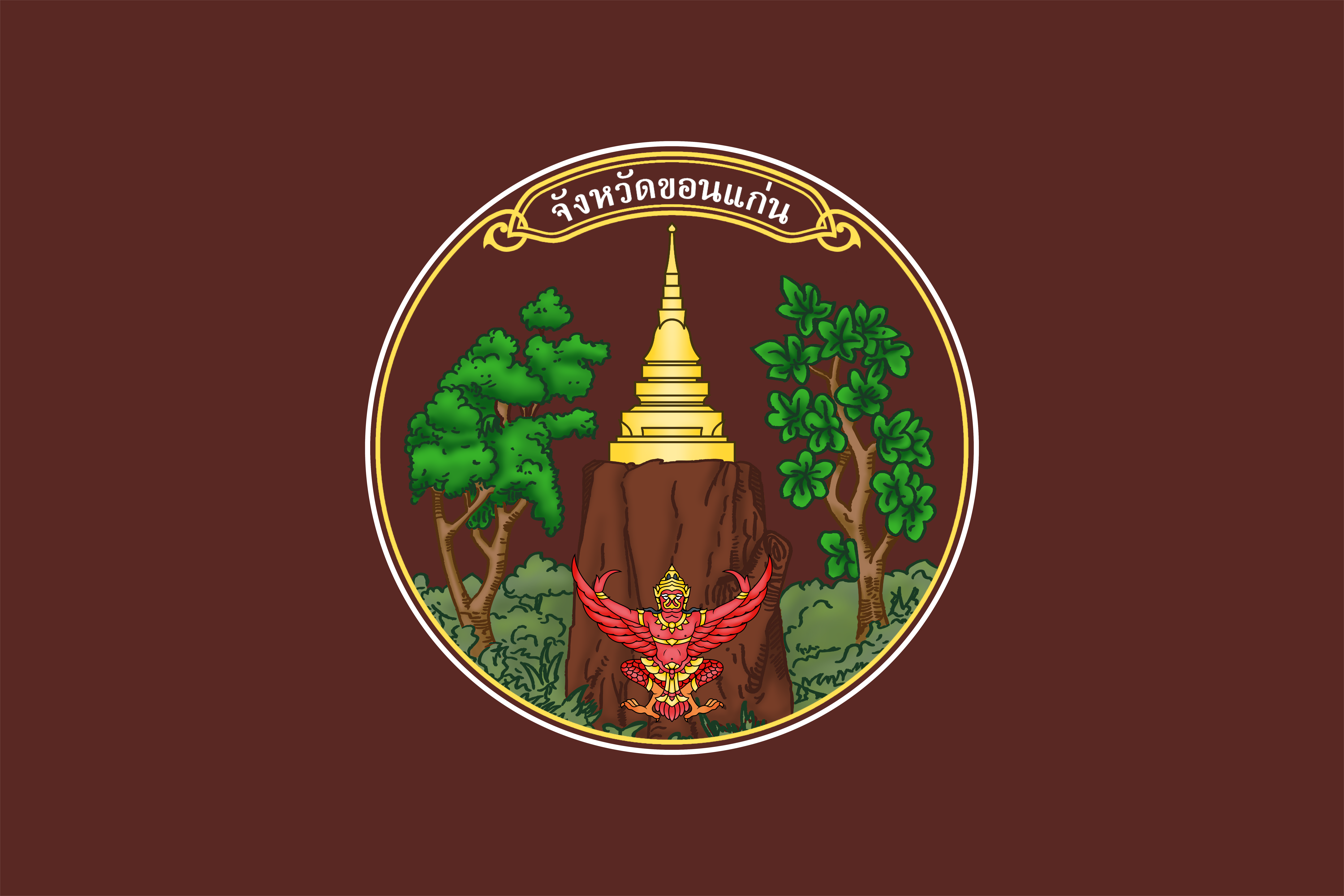
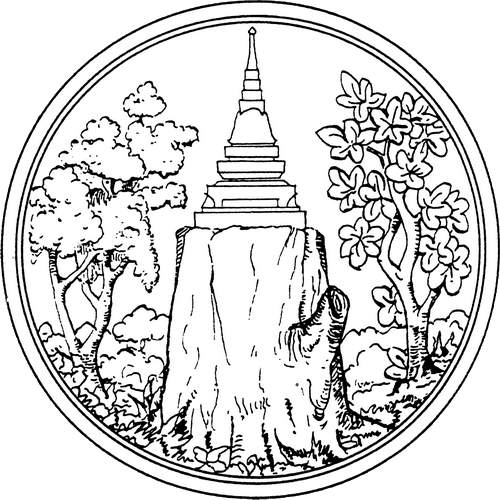
- Flag Seal
- Mottoes: พระธาตุขามแก่น เสียงแคนดอกคูน ศูนย์รวมผ้าไหม ร่วมใจผูกเสี่ยว เที่ยวขอนแก่นนครใหญ่ ไดโนเสาร์สิรินธรเน่ สุดเท่เหรียญทองแรกมวยโอลิมปิก ("Phra That Kham Kaen. The sound of the khaen and the golden shower tree. Center of silk. United in the Phuk Siao tradition. Travel to Khon Kaen, the big city. Sirindhorna dinosaurs. Spectacular first gold in Olympic boxing.")
- Map of Thailand highlighting Khon Kaen province
- Country: Thailand
- Capital: Khon Kaen

Government
  - Governor: Kraison Thongchalart
  - PAO Chief Executive: Wattana Changlao

Area
  - Total: 10,659 km^{2} (4,115 sq mi)
  - Rank: 14th

Population (2024)
  - Total: ▼1,772,381
  - Rank: 5th
  - Density: 166/km^{2} (430/sq mi)
  - Rank: 19th

Human Achievement Index
  - HAI (2022): 0.6532 "somewhat high" Ranked 22nd

GDP
  - Total: baht 204 billion (US$6.8 billion) (2019)
- Time zone: UTC+7 (ICT)
- Postal code: 40xxx
- Calling code: 043
- ISO 3166 code: TH-40
- Vehicle registration: ขอนแก่น
- Website: khonkaen.go.th

Khon Kaen (Thai: ขอนแก่น, pronounced [kʰɔ̌ːn kɛ̀n]; Northeastern Thai: ขอนแก่น, pronounced [kʰɔ̌ːn kɛ́n]) is one of Thailand's 76 provinces (changwat). It is a triply-landlocked province in central northeastern Thailand. Neighboring provinces are (from north, clockwise) Nong Bua Lamphu, Udon Thani, Kalasin, Maha Sarakham, Buriram, Nakhon Ratchasima, Chaiyaphum, Phetchabun, and Loei.

== History ==
Several bronze and iron tools used as axes have been discovered in the province, along with a bronze ring attached to a skeleton. This is in addition to a copper axe found from 4,600 to 4,800 (2600 BC to 2800 BC), the oldest in Southeast Asia. During the Dvaravati period, Khon Kaen was influenced by the culture of the central region. The oldest inscription found in Khon Kaen dates back to the 8th century and is written in the Old Mon language, suggesting the presence of Mon people in the area at that time.The Dvaravati culture is believed to have played a significant role in the region, and the Nyah Kur people are thought to be descendants of the Dvaravati Mon people. During the 10th–11th centuries and onwards, the area came under Khmer influence, as evidenced by various inscriptions. The area fell into the control of Lan Xang before coming under Central Thai control.

The first city of the area was established in 1783 when Rajakruluang settled there with 330 people. King Rama I made Rajakruluang the first governor of the area when establishing tighter connections with the Isan area. The main city was moved six times until in 1879 it reached its present-day location at Nuang Kaw. Khon Kaen was under the governance of Udon in the early period of Rattanakosin, c. 2450 BCE. The Integrated Opisthorchiasis Control Program, also known as the Lawa Project, an internationally recognized liver fluke control program, has its offices in the Ban Phai and Ban Haet Districts south of Khon Kaen city.

Other satellite cities that has to do with the separation from the city of Suwannabhumi and later separated into a city in the province of Khon Kaen after 1797 that includes the city of Mancha Khiri district.

Khon Kaen was incorporated as a city in 1797.

== Symbols ==
The seal of the province shows the stupa (tower) of Phra That Kham Kaen, which is believed to contain relics of Buddha. A tree is depicted on each side. One is a banyan tree (Ficus benghalensis), the other a Golden Shower Tree (Cassia fistula). The Thai name of the golden shower means 'providing support and preventing a decline', and it is also the provincial flower. The provincial tree is the pink shower tree (Cassia bakeriana), the Thai name of which translates as 'wishing tree'. The provincial aquatic life is the edible carp Osteochilus melanopleura.

== Culture ==
=== Sinxay ===
Representations of characters from Sang Sinxay on lampposts in Khon Kaen

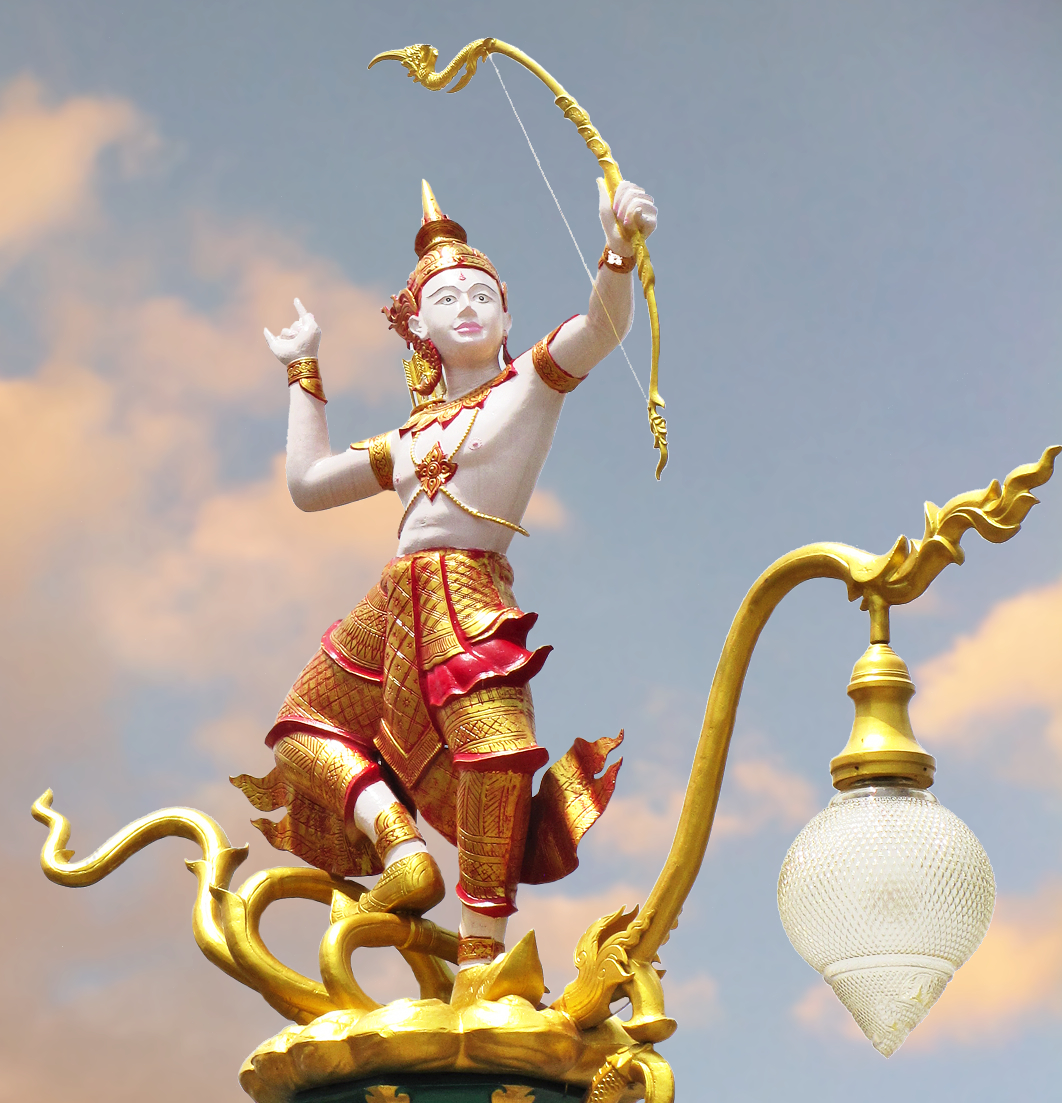
Lamppost finial depicting Sinxay

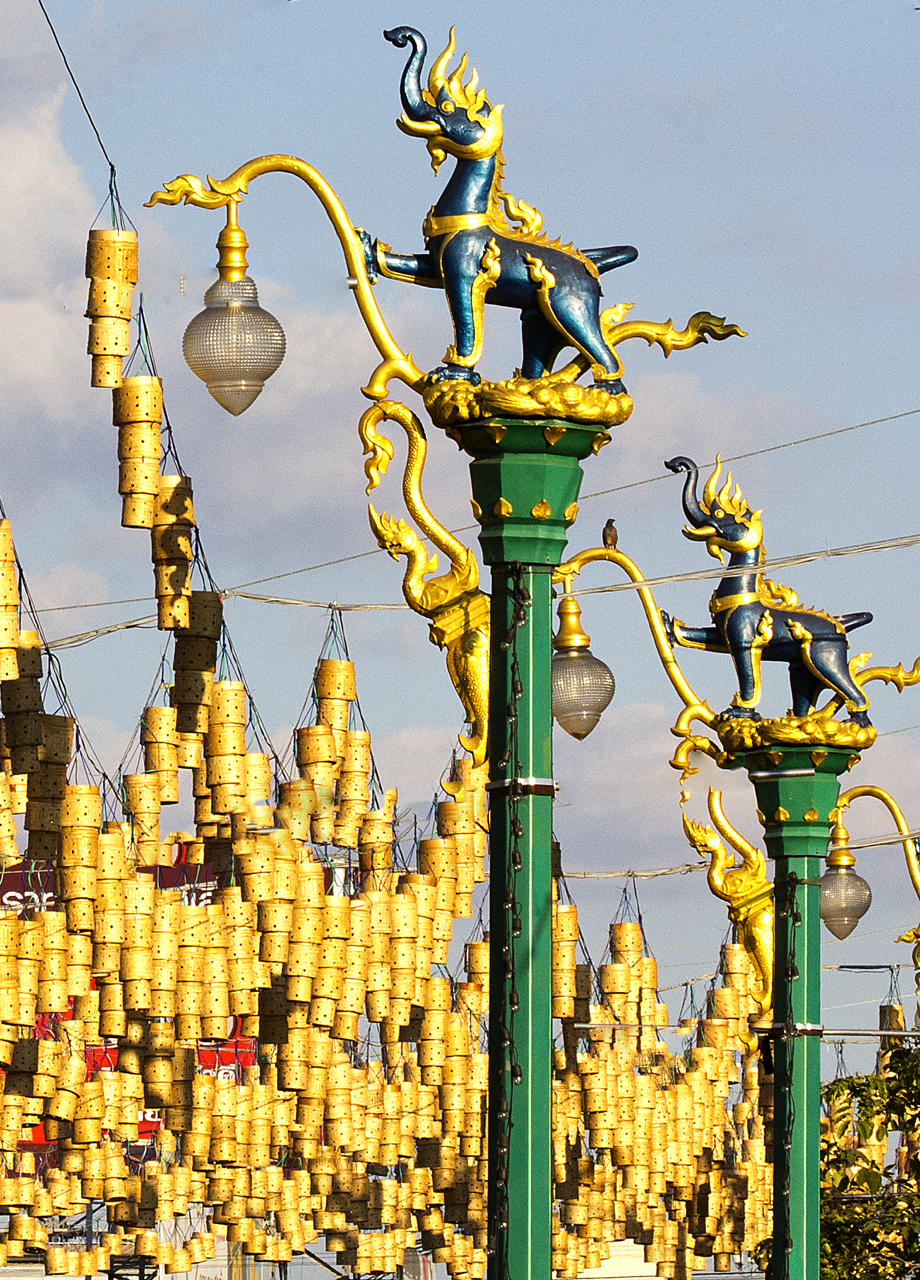
Lamppost finial depicting Siho

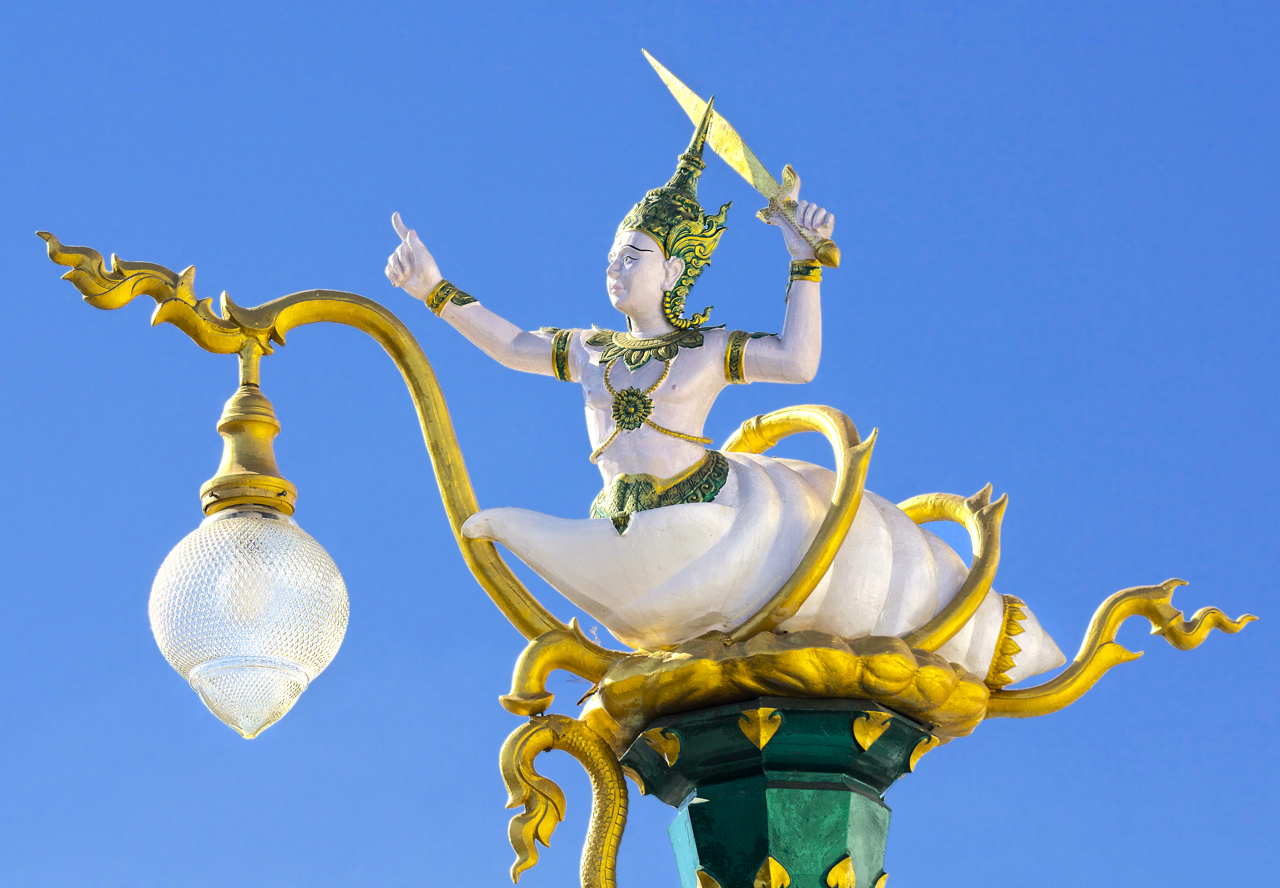
Lamppost finial depicting Sangthong

The mayor of Khon Kaen in 2005 chose Sinxay to be the new identity of the Khon Kaen and had finials designed representing Sinxay and his two brothers, Siho and Sangthong. The story of Sang Sinxay, one of the masterpieces of Lao literature written by Pang Kham in 1649, during the Lan Xang period.

== Geography ==
Khon Kaen occupies part of the Khorat Plateau. The Chi and Phong Rivers flow through the province. The total forest area is 1,222 km^{2} (472 sq mi) or 11.5 percent of provincial area.

=== National parks ===
There are four national parks, three of which along with three other national parks make up region 8 (Khon Kaen), and Phu Kao–Phu Phan Kham in region 10 (Udon Thani) of Thailand's protected areas. (Visitors in fiscal year 2024)

Phu Pha Man National Park	350 km^{2} (140 sq mi)	(37,404)
Phu Wiang National Park	325 km^{2} (125 sq mi)	(68,626)
Phu Kao–Phu Phan Kham National Park	318 km^{2} (123 sq mi)	(84,867)
Nam Phong National Park	197 km^{2} (76 sq mi)	(27,256)

Location protected areas of Khon Kaen

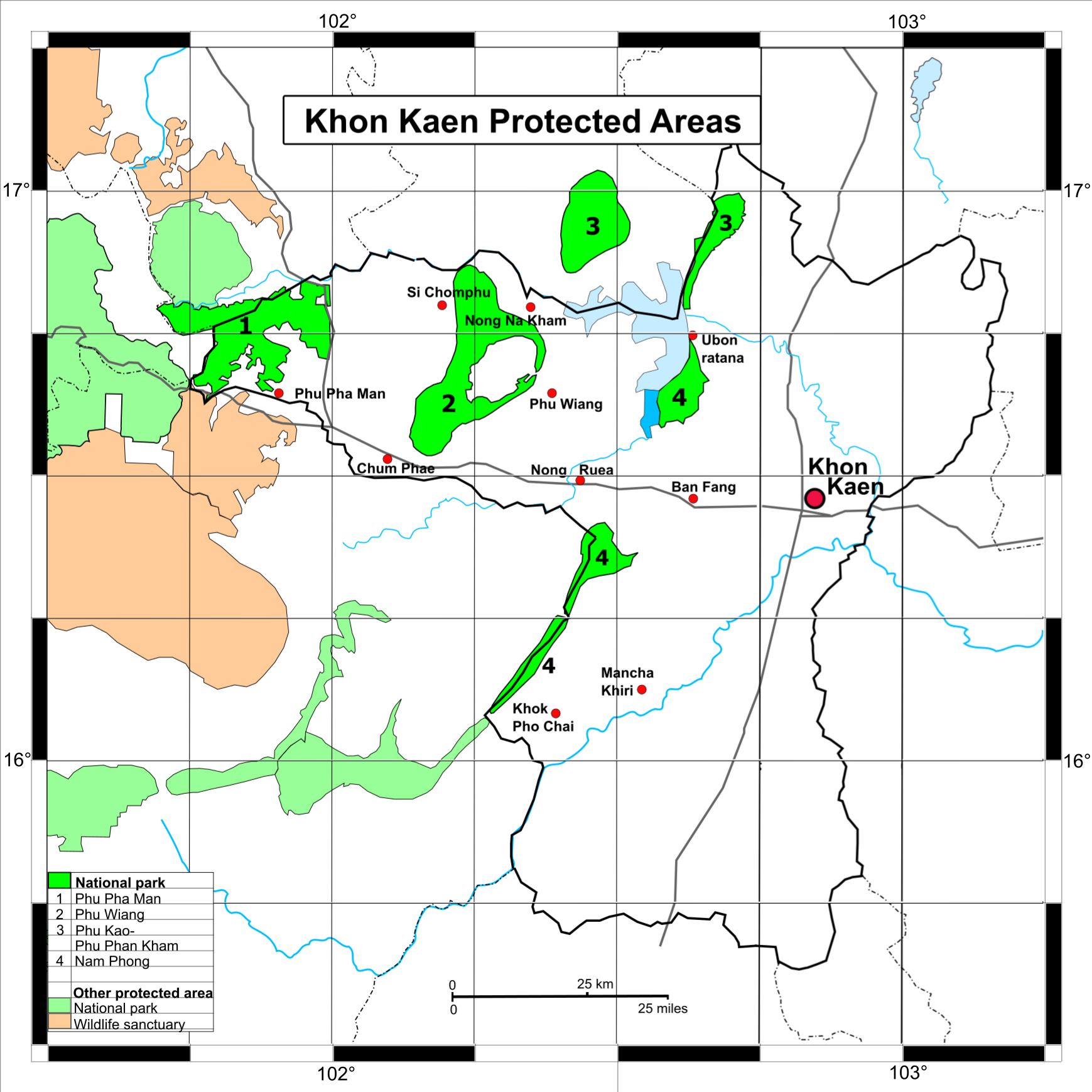
Khon Kaen protected areas

	National park
1	Phu Pha Man
2	Phu Wiang
3	Phu Kao-Phu Phan Kham
4	Nam Phong

== Administrative divisions ==
Map of twenty six districts

=== Provincial government ===
The province is divided into 26 districts (amphoes). The districts are further divided into 198 subdistricts (tambons) and 2,139 villages (mubans).

1. Mueang Khon Kaen
2. Ban Fang
3. Phra Yuen
4. Nong Ruea
5. Chum Phae
6. Si Chomphu
7. Nam Phong
8. Ubolratana
9. Kranuan
10. Ban Phai
11. Pueai Noi
12. Phon
13. Waeng Yai
14. Waeng Noi
15. Nong Song Hong
16. Phu Wiang
17. Mancha Khiri
18. Chonnabot
19. Khao Suan Kwang
20. Phu Pha Man
21. Sam Sung
22. Khok Pho Chai
23. Nong Na Kham
24. Ban Haet
25. Non Sila
26. Wiang Kao

- The numbers 26 to 28 were reserved for three other planned (minor) districts: Phu Kham Noi, Nong Kae, and Non Han.

There are plans to split off the northwestern part of the province to form a new province centered at Phu Wiang. The other districts which will belong to this new province are Nong Ruea, Chum Phae, Si Chomphu, Phu Pha Man, Nong Na Kham, and Wiang Kao.

=== Local government ===
As of 26 November 2019 there are: one Khon Kaen Provincial Administration Organisation (ongkan borihan suan changwat) and 84 municipal (thesaban) areas in the province. Khon Kaen has city (thesaban nakhon) status. Ban Phai, Ban Thum, Chum Phae, Kranuan, Mueang Phon and Sila have town (thesaban mueang) status. Further 77 subdistrict municipalities (thesaban tambon). The non-municipal areas are administered by 140 Subdistrict Administrative Organisations - SAO (ongkan borihan suan tambon).

== Education ==
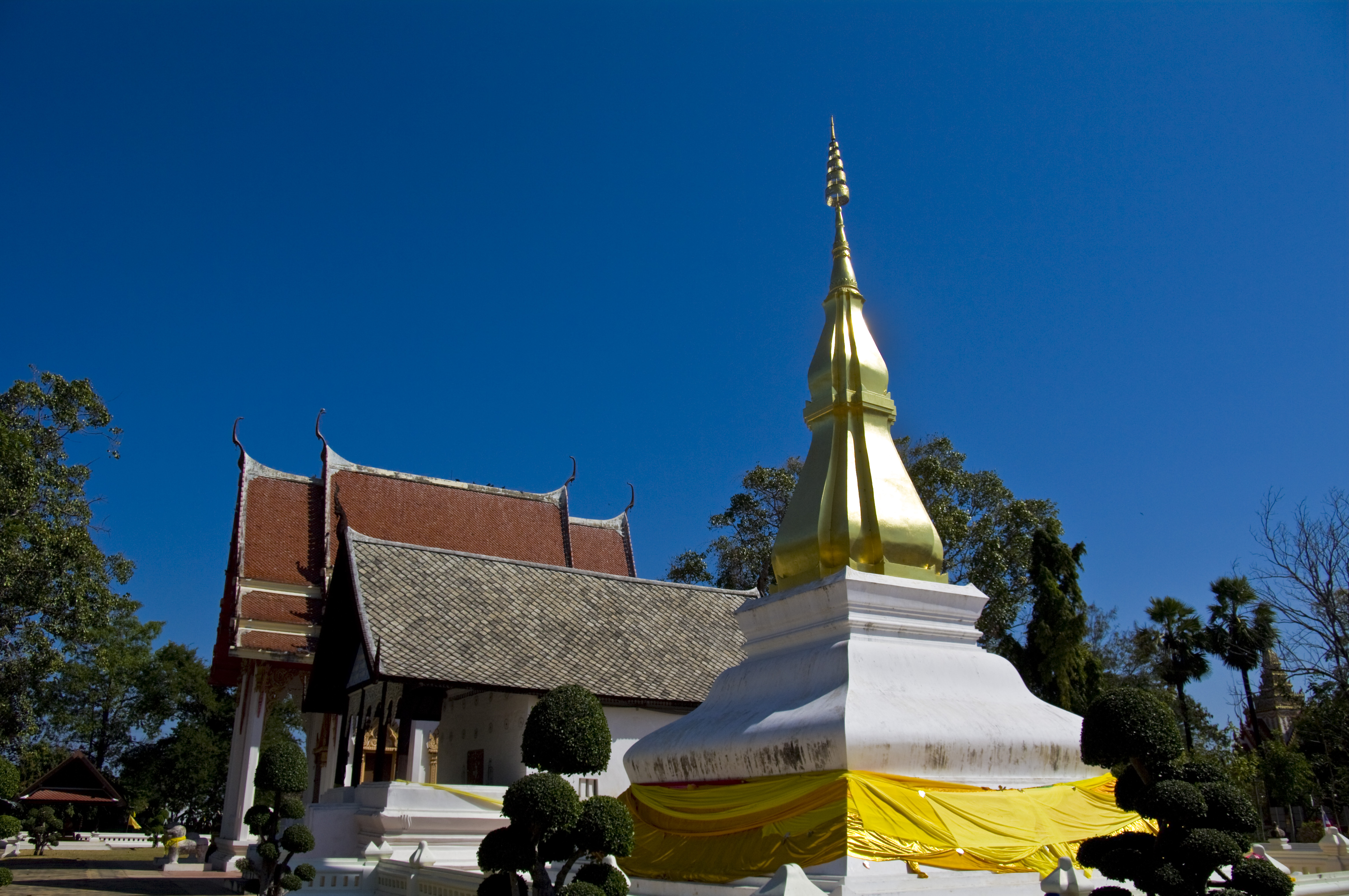
Phra That Kham Kaen, Nam Phong District

Khon Kaen Province has a variety of basic education institutions.

Primary schools are under the jurisdiction of the Khon Kaen Primary Educational Service Area Office, which comprises five districts. Local administrative organizations cover 43 educational opportunity expansion schools, and two are under the jurisdiction of Khon Kaen University.

Secondary schools include schools from three jurisdictions :

- Secondary Educational Service Area Office 25, covering 84 secondary schools in Khon Kaen Province.
- Khon Kaen Provincial Administrative Organization, covering 17 secondary schools in Khon Kaen Province.
- Two are under the jurisdiction of Khon Kaen University.

Vocational education institutions, both public and private, are under the supervision of the Office of the Vocational Education Commission.

Higher education institutions, both public and private, include Khon Kaen University, the largest, oldest, and most important university in the Northeast.

== Health ==
Khon Kaen has both public and private health facilities providing health services to the public. These include major government hospitals such as Khon Kaen Hospital, Srinagarind Hospital Faculty of Medicine, Khon Kaen University, and Khon Kaen Rajanagarindra Psychiatric Hospital, as well as leading private hospitals such as Khon Kaen Ram Hospital, Ratchaphruek Hospital, and Bangkok Hospital Khon Kaen. Other public health facilities, such as health centers, municipal public health service centers, and subdistrict health promotion hospitals, are scattered throughout the province.

== Transport ==
Air

Khon Kaen International Airport (IATA: KKC, ICAO: VTUK) is located in Ban Ped subdistrict, Mueang Khon Kaen district, Khon Kaen province. Approximately 8 kilometers west of the city center and 2 kilometers from Highway No. 12 (Khon Kaen - Loei), it covers an area of 1,780,800 square meters and is an airport under the Department of Airports, Ministry of Transport. It was announced as a customs airport on September 1, 1991.

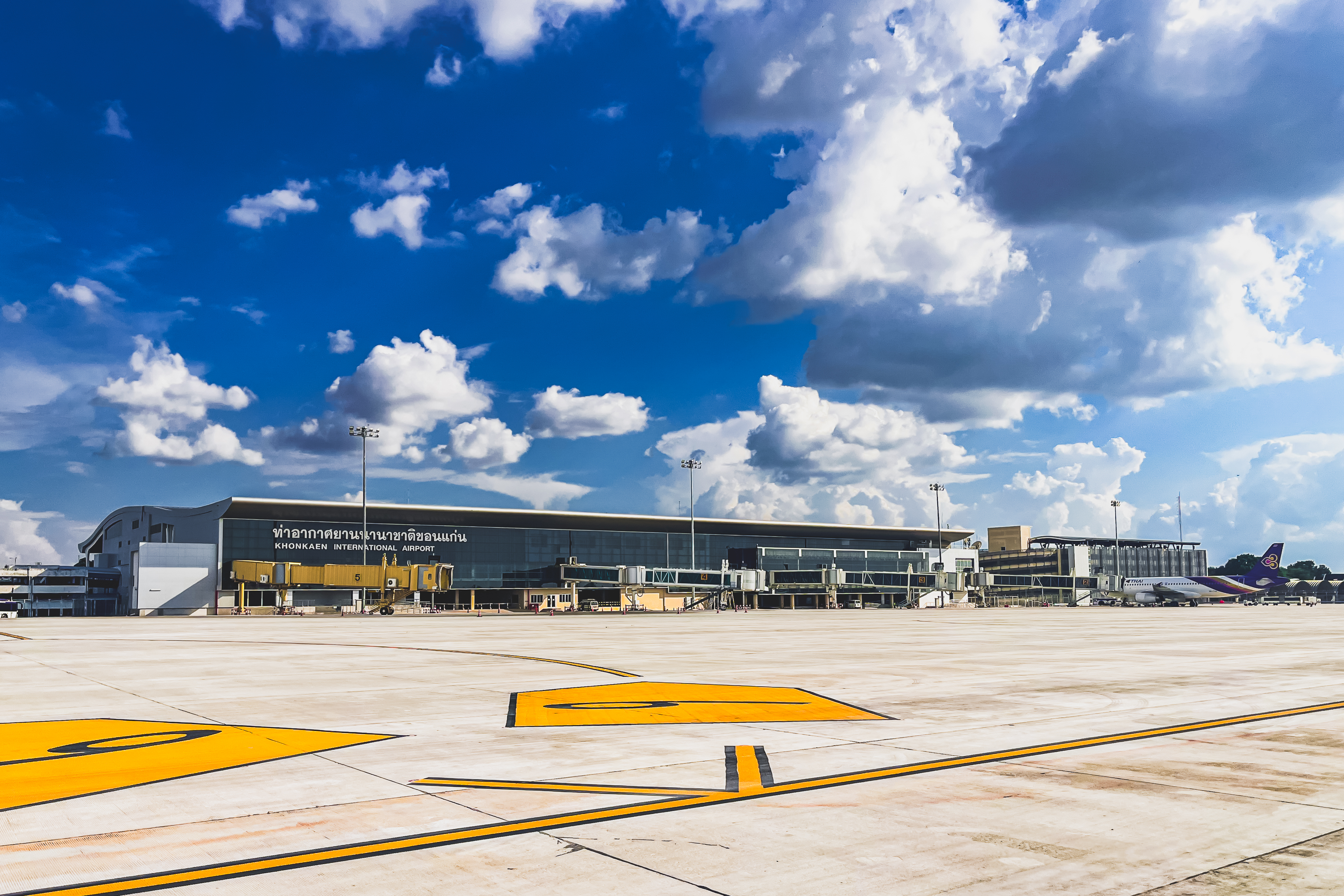
Khon Kaen International Airport

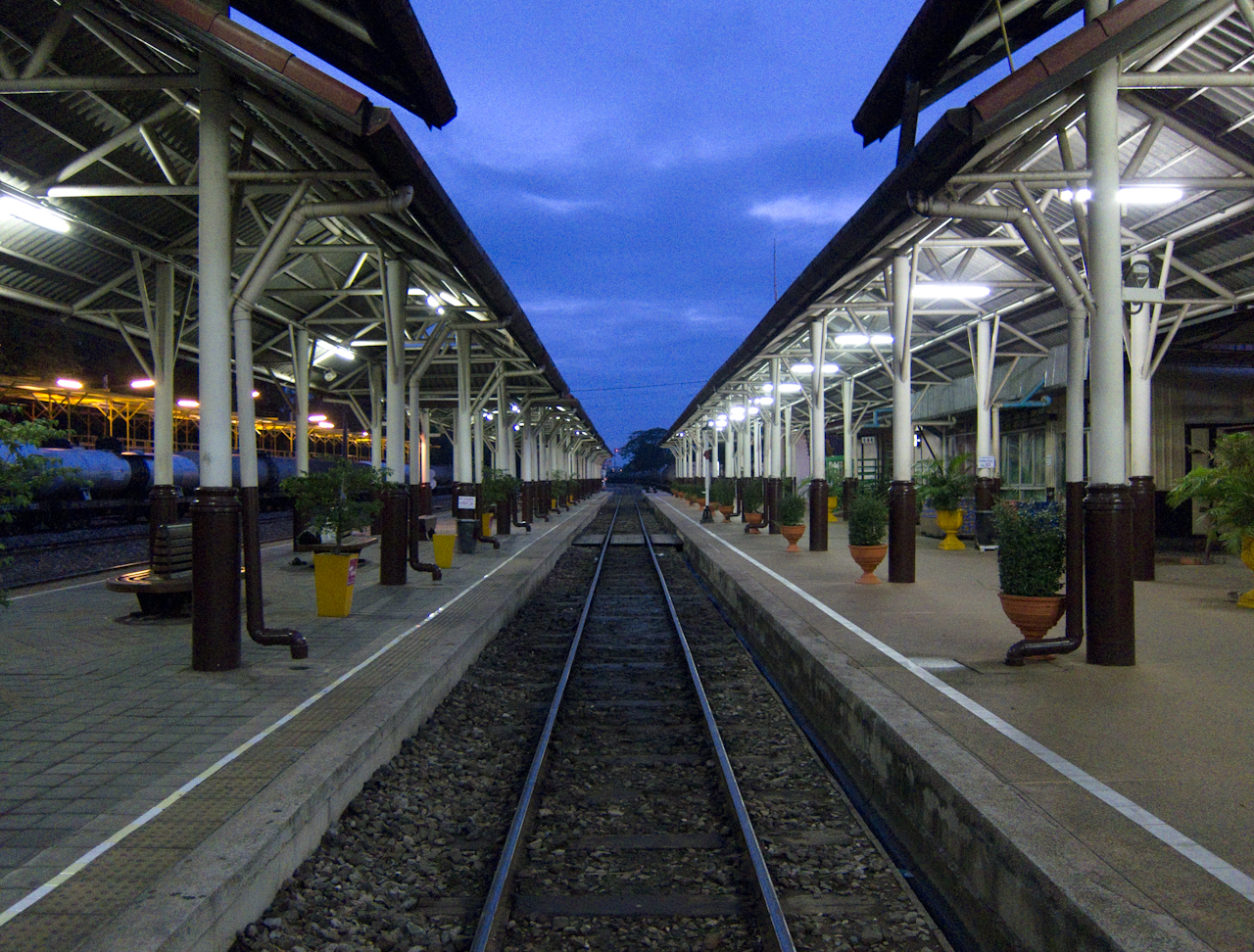
Khon Kaen Railway Station

Rail

The railway system in Khon Kaen is on both northeastern routes from Bangkok Railway Station. Khon Kaen province's main railway stations was Khon Kaen Railway Station. In 2017, a 60 kilometre dual-track line will connect Khon Kaen to Nakhon Ratchasima province. It is the first segment of a dual track network that will connect Isan with the Laem Chabang seaport.

Road

The city is bisected by Mittraphap Road, also known as "Friendship Highway", or Asian Highway 2 (AH2), the road linking Bangkok to the Thai-Lao Friendship Bridge. A multi-lane bypass enables through-traffic to avoid the city center to the west, and connects to the airport and to the main roads to Kalasin province and Maha Sarakham province in the east, and Udon Thani province in the north.

== Sport ==
The sports teams listed below are based in Khon Kaen.

Football

- Khon Kaen (Thai League 2)—Khon Kaen Provincial Stadium
- Khon Kaen United (Thai League 2)—Khon Kaen Provincial Stadium

Volleyball

- Khonkaen Star (Women's Volleyball Thailand League)—Khonkaen International Convention and Exhibition Center

== Human achievement index 2022 ==
Health	Education	Employment	Income
62	5	47	39
Housing	Family	Transport	Participation
35	27	39	46
Province Khon Kaen, with an HAI 2022 value of 0.6532 is "somewhat high", occupies place 22 in the ranking.

Since 2003, United Nations Development Programme (UNDP) in Thailand has tracked progress on human development at sub-national level using the Human achievement index (HAI), a composite index covering all eight key areas of human development. National Economic and Social Development Board (NESDB) has taken over this task since 2017.

Rank	Classification
1–13	"High"
14–29	"Somewhat high"
30–45	"Average"
46–61	"Somewhat low"
62–77	"Low"

Map with provinces and HAI 2022 rankings

== Sister cities ==
- Nanning, Guangxi, China (2001)
- Gaborone, Botswana

== Notable residents ==
- Paradorn Srichaphan, tennis player, the first Asian to reach top ten of the ATP rankings
- Somluck Kamsing, boxer, the first Thai athlete to win a gold medal at the Olympics
- Nadech Kugimiya, actor
- Sukollawat Kanarot, actor
- Peechaya Wattanamontree, actress
- Apichatpong Weerasethakul, filmmaker
- Kanphanitnan Muangkhumsakul, professional golfer (LPGA Tour)
- Prasit Taodee, footballer

== Gallery ==
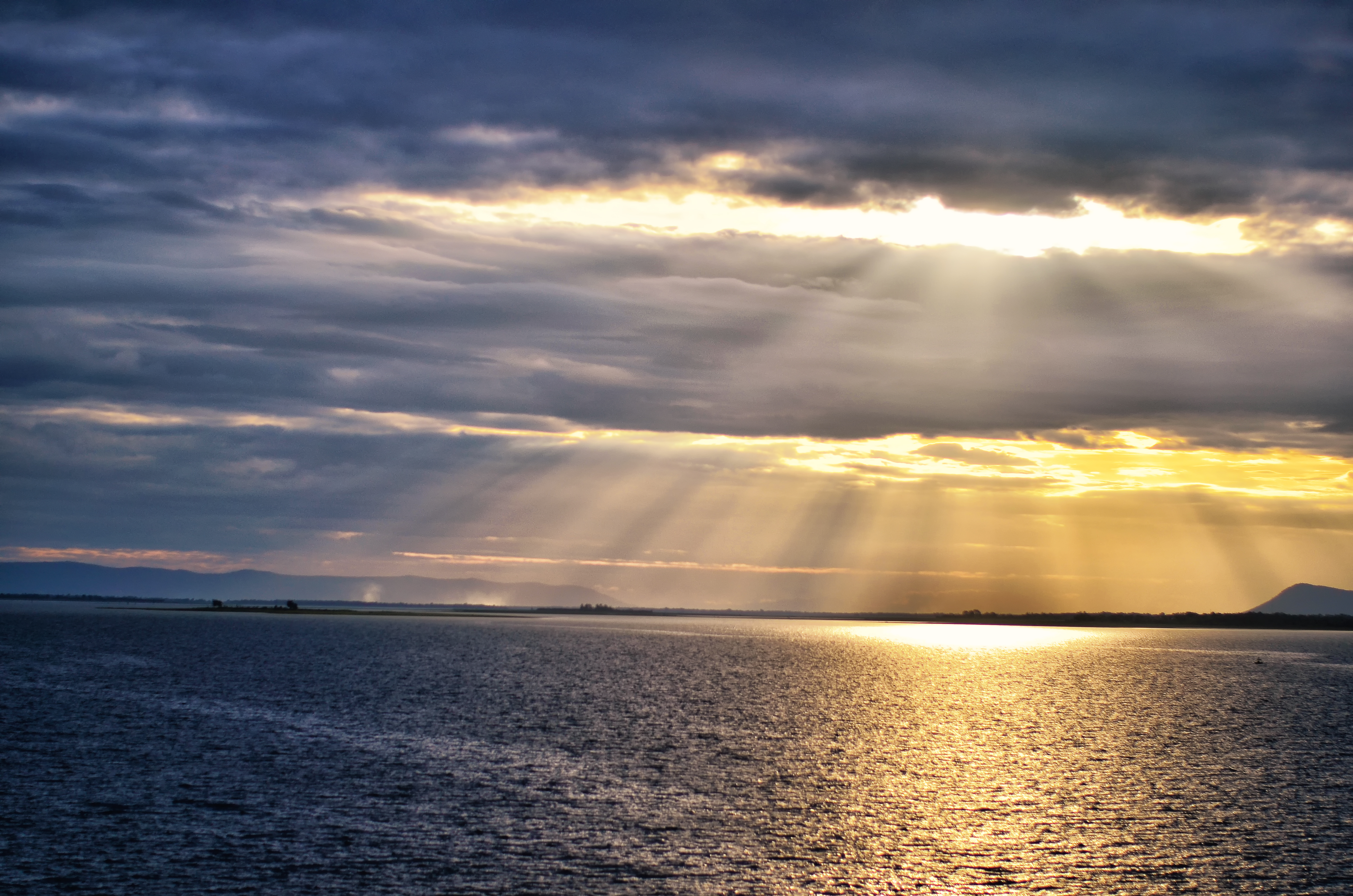
Ubol Ratana Dam
