= Nong Bua Lamphu province =

Province of Thailand

Coordinates: 17°10′N 102°23′E

Nong Bua Lamphu หนองบัวลำภู
- Province
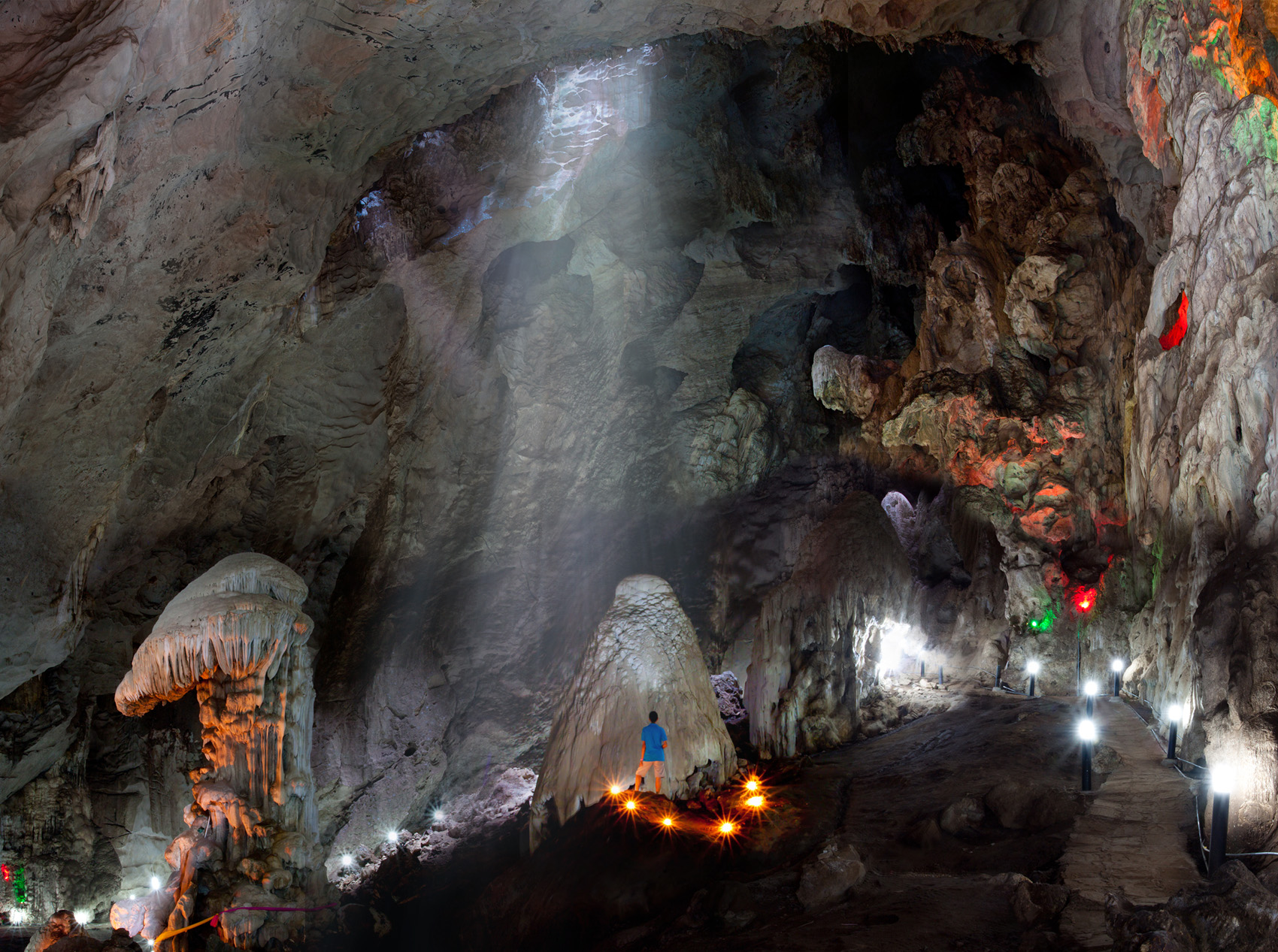
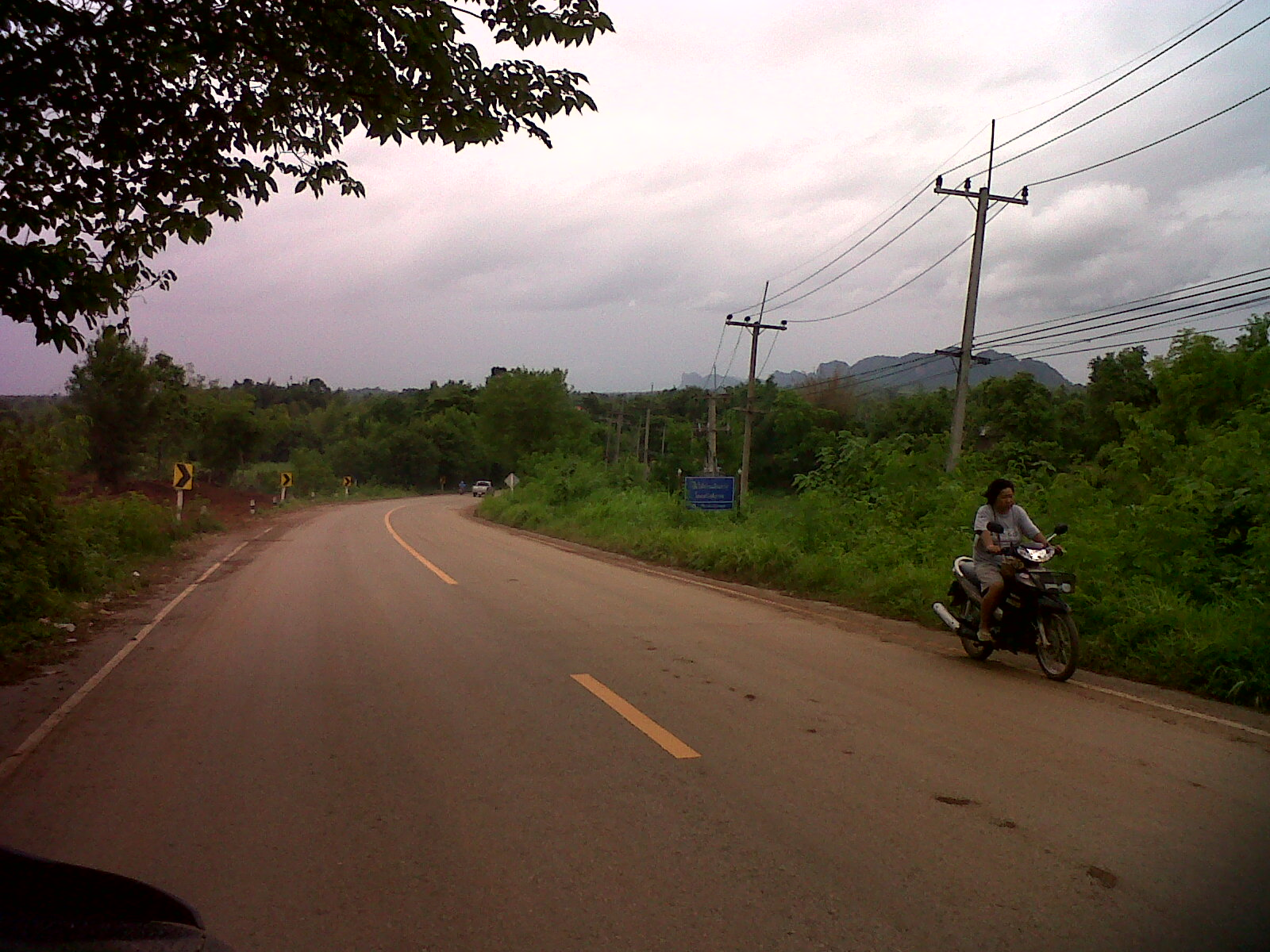
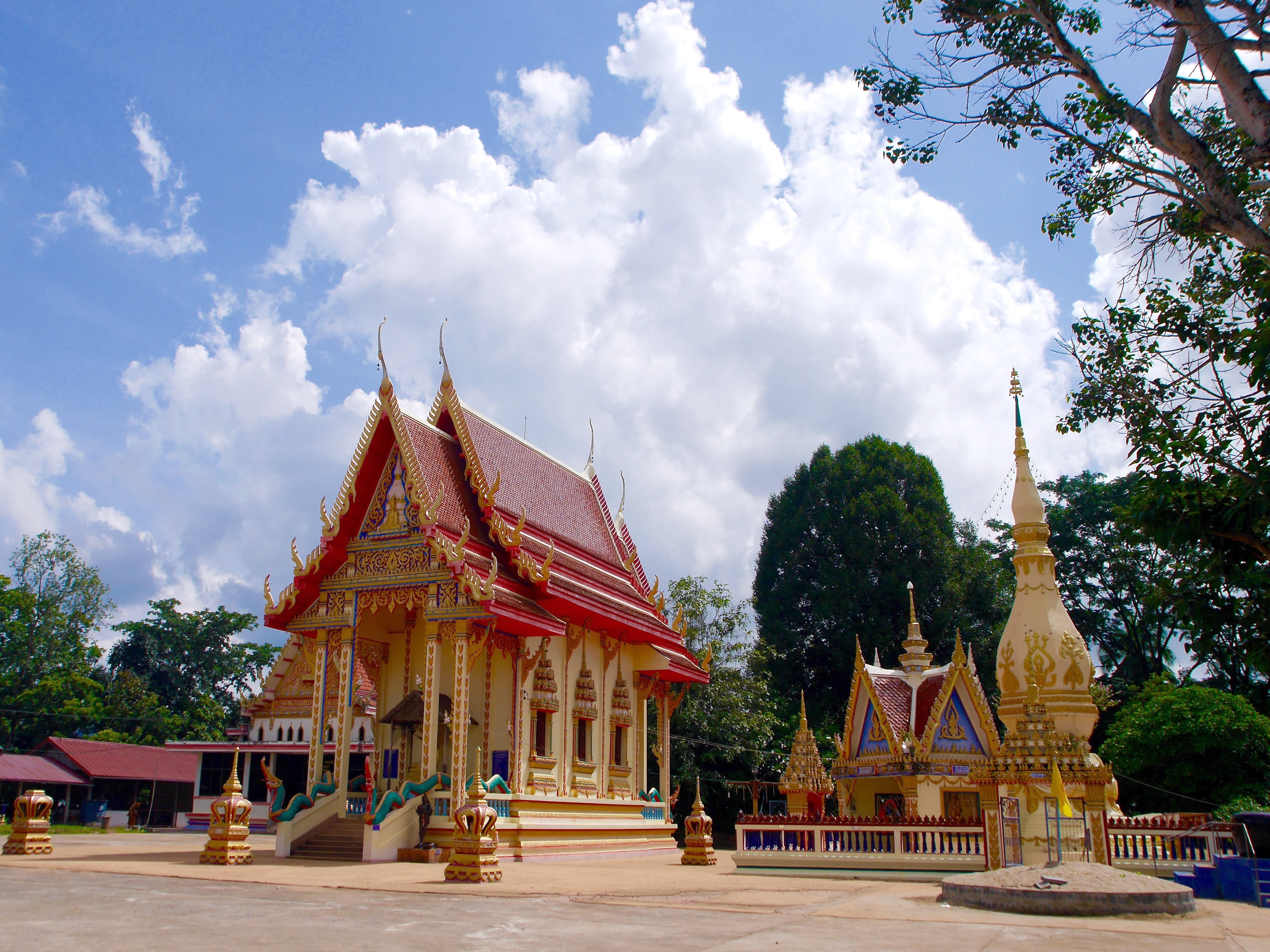
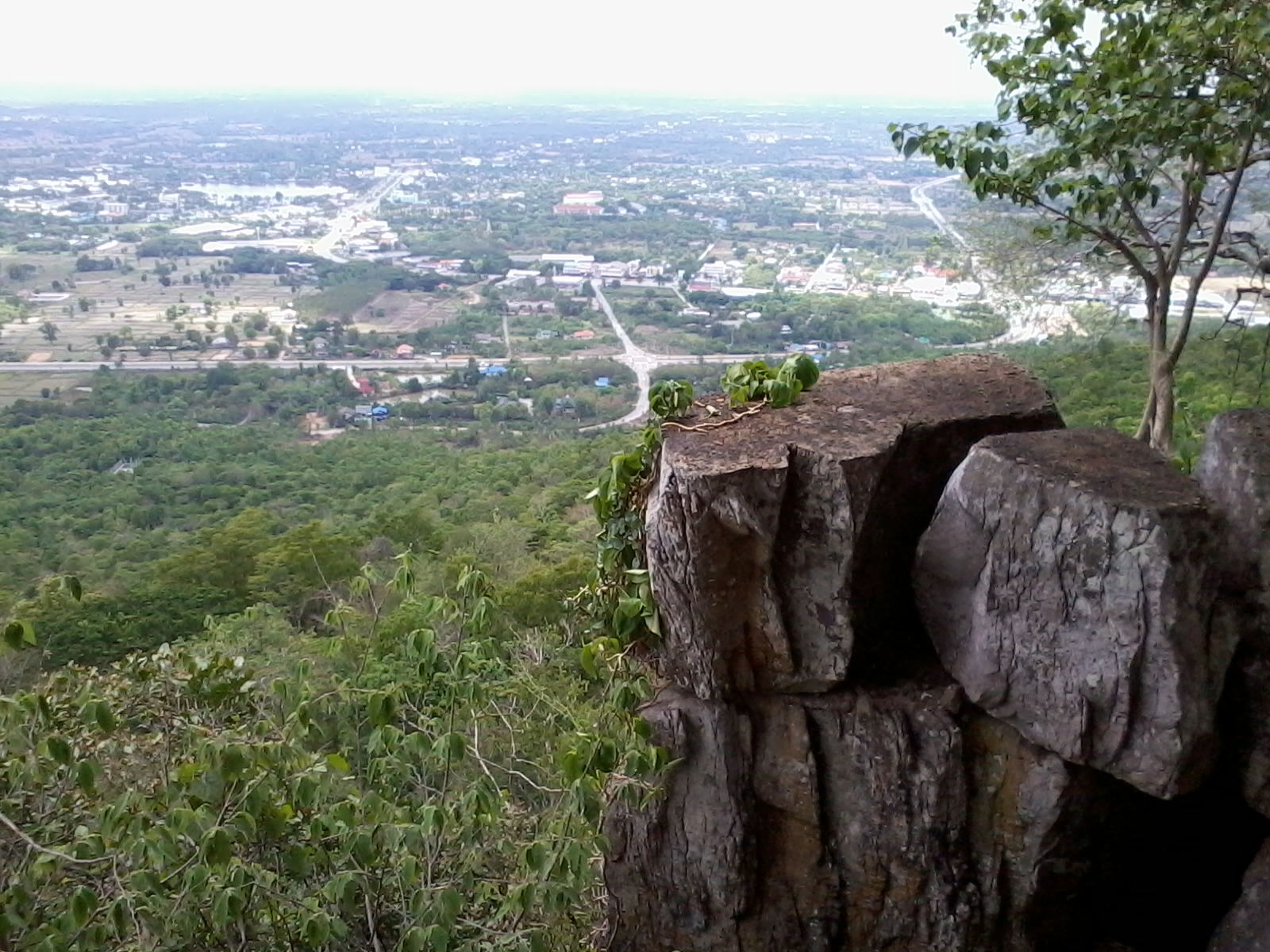
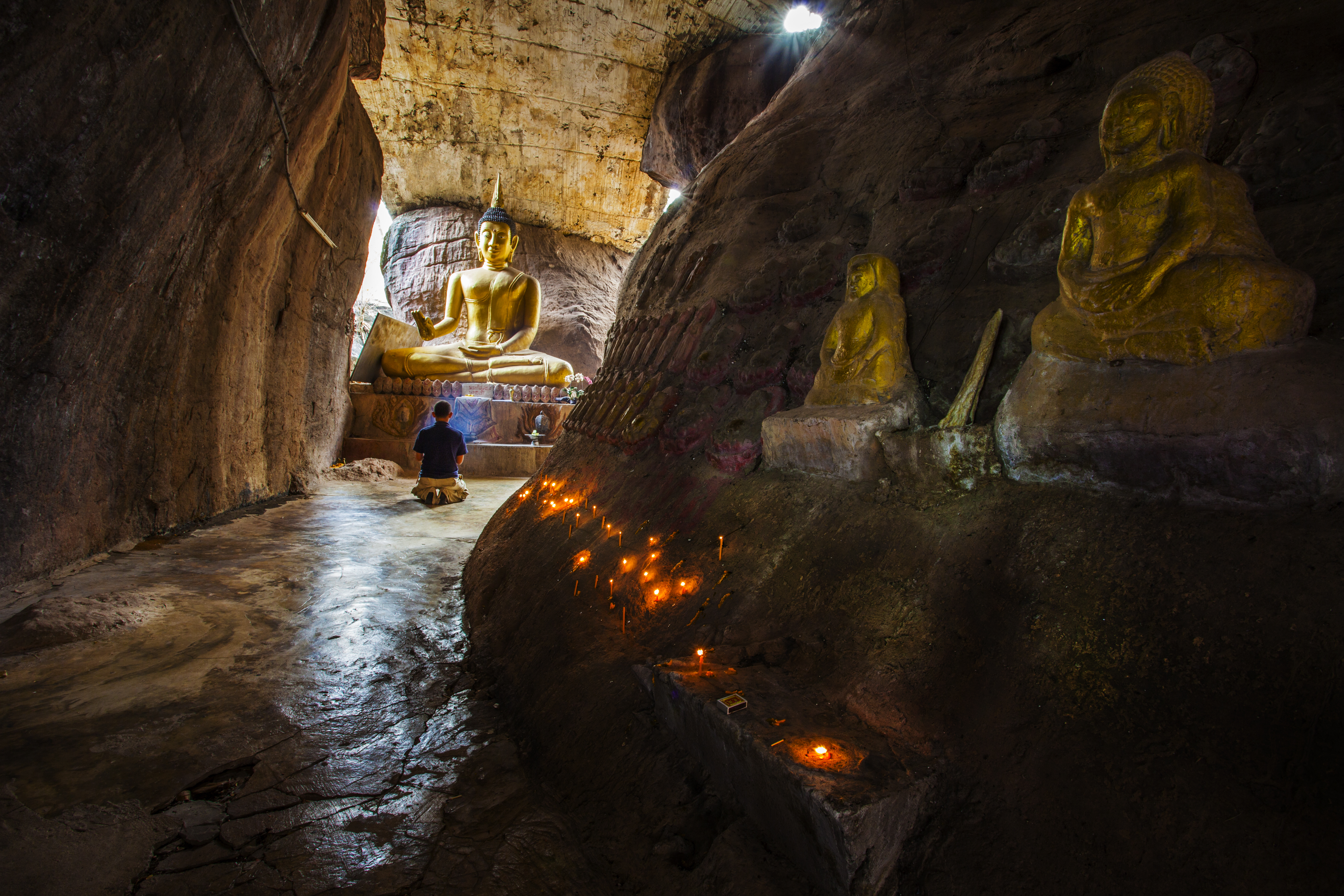
- (Clockwise from top left) Erawan Caves, Nong Bua Lamphu rural road, Wat That Han Thao, Bua Ban Forest Park, Wat Tham Klong Phle

- Flag Seal
- Mottoes: ศาลสมเด็จพระนเรศวรมหาราช อุทยานแห่งชาติภูเก้า ภูพานคำ แผ่นดินธรรมหลวงปู่ขาว เด่นสกาวถ้ำเอราวัณ นครเขื่อนขันธ์กาบแก้วบัวบาน ("Shrine of King Naresuan the Great. Phu Kao National Park. Phu Phan Kham. Land of Dharma and Luang Pu Khao. Famed Erawan cave. Nakhon Khuean Khan Kab Kaew Bua Ban.")
- Map of Thailand highlighting Nong Bua Lam Phu province
- Country: Thailand
- Capital: Nong Bua Lam Phu

Government
  - Type: Province and Provincial Administrative Organization
  - Body: Nong Bua Lamphu Province and Nong Bua Lamphu Provincial Administrative Organization
  - Governor: Surasak Aksornkul
  - PAO Chief Executive: Saranya Suwanphrom

Area
  - Total: 4,099 km^{2} (1,583 sq mi)
  - Rank: 54th

Population (2024)
  - Total: ▲504,379
  - Rank: 54th
  - Density: 123/km^{2} (320/sq mi)
  - Rank: 38th

Human Achievement Index
  - HAI (2022): 0.6098 "low" Ranked 75th

GDP
  - Total: baht 25 billion (US$0.9 billion) (2019)
- Time zone: UTC+7 (ICT)
- Postal code: 39xxx
- Calling code: 042
- ISO 3166 code: TH-39
- Website: nongbualamphu.go.th nppao.go.th

Nong Bua Lamphu (sometimes rendered Nongbua Lamphu and Nong Bua Lam Phu) (Thai: หนองบัวลำภู, RTGS: Nong Bua Lam Phu, pronounced [nɔ̌ːŋ būa lām pʰūː]; Northeastern Thai: หนองบัวลำภู, pronounced [nɔ̌ːŋ bùa lâm pʰûː]) is one of Thailand's seventy-six provinces (changwat). It lies in upper northeastern Thailand, a region also known as Isan. The province was created in 1993 when five districts were split from Udon Thani province. Neighbouring provinces are (clockwise from North) Udon Thani, Khon Kaen, and Loei. Nong Bua Lamphu is one of the eight quadruply-landlocked Thai provinces, as its neighboring provinces are triply-landlocked.

== Geography ==
Nong Bua Lamphu is in the heart of the Khorat Plateau. The total forest area is 480 km^{2} (190 sq mi), or 11.7 percent of the area of the province.

=== National parks ===
There is one national park and one national park (preparation), along with five other national parks, make up region 10 (Udon Thani) of Thailand's protected areas. (Visitors in fiscal year 2024)

Phu Kao–Phu Phan Kham National Park	318 km^{2} (123 sq mi)	(84,867)
Phu Hin Chom That–Phu Phra Bat National Park	177 km^{2} (68 sq mi)	(25,865)

=== Climate ===
Nong Bua Lamphu province has a tropical savanna climate (Köppen climate classification category Aw). Winters are dry and warm. Temperatures rise until May. The monsoon season runs from May through October, with heavy rain and somewhat cooler temperatures during the day, although nights remain warm. Climate statistics: the maximum temperature is 43.6 °C (110.5 °F) in April and the lowest temperature is 10.3 °C (50.5 °F) in January. The highest average temperature is 40.5 °C (104.9 °F) and the minimum average temperature is 16.2 °C (61.2 °F). Annual total rainfall was 1,409 millimetres (55.5 in) with total 105 rainy days. Maximum daily rainfall was 96.4 mm (3.80 in) on August 27, 2024.

== Paleontological remains ==
Chalawan, an extinct genus of crocodylin, is known solely from its holotype collected in the early-1980s from a road-cut near the town of Nong Bua Lam Phu, in the upper part of the Phu Kradung Formation. This single specimen is the most well preserved vertebrate fossil that has been found from the formation. It contains a single species, Chalawan thailandicus.

== History ==
Nong Bua Lam Phu is noted for it being the area where in the 16th century, Naresuan, the king-liberator of Siam, came to learn of the outcome of a war between the Lao and Burmese in the area of Vientiane. This place was formerly a Lao stronghold and named "Nakhon Khuean Khan Kab Kaew Bua Ban" (Thai: นครเขื่อนขันธ์กาบแก้วบัวบาน). During the existence of the Lao Kingdom of Lan Xang (1354–1707), Nong Bua Lam Phu was traditionally given to the crown prince (Uparat) to rule. It was the birthplace of the principal wife of Ong Boun (พระเจ้าศิริบุญสาร), the last independent king of Vientiane. In 1827, Chao Anou of Vientiane designated Phagna Narin to be governor at the onset of the Laotian Rebellion of 1826–1828.

Under Thai rule, the province originally consisted of five amphoe (districts) in Udon Thani province. In 1993 Udon was decentralized and a separate province of Nong Bua Lam Phu was created. It is one of the newest provinces of Thailand, together with Amnat Charoen province, Sa Kaeo province, and Bueng Kan province.

On 6 October 2022, a mass murder occurred at and near a daycare center in Uthai Sawan, a town located in the province. A total of 36 people were killed, and 10 others were injured, before the attacker committed suicide. It was the deadliest mass murder by a single perpetrator in the modern history of Thailand.

== Symbols ==
The seal of the province shows King Naresuan in a shrine. This shrine was built to commemorate the visit of King Naresuan to the city of Nong Bua Lam Phu in 1574 when he was gathering troops to fight the Burmese kingdom Toungoo. Behind the shrine is a pond with lotus flowers (Nymphaea lotus), which is the provincial flower. The provincial tree is the Siamese rosewood (Dalbergia cochinchinensis). The edible minnow Henicorhynchus siamensis is the provincial aquatic life.

== Demography ==
=== Population ===
Population history of Nong Bua Lamphu province is as follows:

2000	2010	2020
482,207	485,974	509,470

=== Religion ===
There are total 475 Theravada Buddhist temples in the province, of which 379 Maha Nikai and 96 Dhammayut temples.

- 135 in Mueang Nong Bua Lamphu district
- 112 in Si Bun Rueang district
- 83 in Non Sang district
- 62 in Suwannakhuha district
- 55 in Na Klang district
- 28 in Na Wang district

== Administrative divisions ==
Map of six districts

=== Provincial government ===
The province is divided into six districts (amphoe). The districts are further divided into 59 subdistricts (tambon) and 636 villages (muban).

1. Mueang Nong Bua Lam Phu
2. Na Klang
3. Non Sang
4. Si Bun Rueang
5. Suwannakhuha
6. Na Wang

=== Local government ===
As of 26 November 2019 there are: one Nong Bua Lamphu Provincial Administration Organisation (ongkan borihan suan changwat) and 24 municipal (thesaban) areas in the province. Nong Bua Lamphu has town (thesaban mueang) status. Further 23 subdistrict municipalities (thesaban tambon). The non-municipal areas are administered by 43 Subdistrict Administrative Organisations – SAO (ongkan borihan suan tambon).

== Education ==
Educational institutions from kindergarten to vocational education in Nong Bua Lamphu province is as follows:

=== Vocational education ===
- Total eleven vocational colleges with 8,723 students.

=== Secondary education ===
- Total 23 upper secondary schools with 8,614 students.
- Total 91 lower secondary schools with 16,031 students.

=== Primary education ===
- Total 234 primary schools with 31,485 pupils.

== Health ==
=== Government hospitals ===
There are six government hospitals in Nong Bua Lamphu province, of which Mueang Nong Bua Lamphu district has one general hospital:

- Mueang Nong Bua Lamphu Hospital with 353 beds.

The other five districts each have a community hospital:

Si Bun Rueang Hospital	90 beds
Na Klang Hospital	60 beds
Non Sang Hospital	40 beds
Suwannakhuha Hospital	40 beds
Na Wang CP Hospital	30 beds

=== Private hospital ===
There is one private hospital in Mueang Nong Bua Lamphu district:

- Veerapolkanpat Hospital with 50 beds.

=== Health promoting hospitals ===
There are total 83 health-promoting hospitals in the province, of which:

- 20 in Mueang Nong Bua Lamphu district
- 17 in Si Bun Rueang district
- 14 in Non sang district
- 13 in Suwannakhuha district
- 12 in Na Klang district
- 7 in Na Wang district

=== Clinics ===
Around 159 clinics are in Nong Bua Lamphu province, of which 62 clinics (39%) in Mueang Nong Bua Lamphu, 31 Si Bun Rueang, 25 Suwannakhuha, 20 Na Klang, 14 Non Sang and 7 Na Wang.

== Economy ==
=== Economic output ===
In 2023, Nong Bua Lamphu province had an economic output of 32.332 billion baht (US$850 million). This amounts to per capita gross provincial product (GPP) of 69,000 baht (US$1,815). In 2025 the total workforce was 219,415 of which 214,568 persons were employed in economic activity. In agriculture and fishery 98,474 persons (45.9%) were employed and in the non-agricultural sector 116,094 persons (54.1%).

Gross Provincial Product (GPP)
	Activities	Baht	Percent
1	Agriculture	7,656,000,000	23.7
2	Manufacturing	6,152,000,000	19.0
3	Trade	4,208,000,000	13.0
4	Education	3,872,000,000	12.0
5	Finance	2,644,000,000	8.2
6	Real estate	1,576,000,000	4.9
7	Defence / publ.admin.	1,391,000,000	4.3
8	Human health	1,057,000,000	3.3
9	Transportation	958,000,000	3.0
10	Construction	755,000,000	2.3
11	Energy	491,000,000	1.5
12	Mining	437,000,000	1.4
13	Other service activity	341,000,000	1.1
14	Information	299,000,000	0.9
15	Pastime	241,000,000	0.7
16	Water supply	204,000,000	0.6
17	Accommodation / food	32,000,000	0.1
18	Administration	13,000,000	-
19	Scientific activity	6,000,000	-
	Total	32,332,000,000	100

Employed persons
	Activities	Workforce	Percent
1	Agriculture and fishery	98,474	45.9
2	Trade	33,517	15.6
3	Manufacturing	17,163	8.0
4	Defence and publ.admin.	16,160	7.5
5	Accommodation / food	12,119	5.6
6	Construction	11,868	5.5
7	Education	7,625	3.6
8	Other service activity	4,181	2.0
9	Human health	3,753	1.7
10	Transportation	2,997	1.4
11	Finance	2,794	1.3
12	Administration	746	0.4
13	Scientific activity	710	0.3
14	Information	599	0.3
15	Pastime	596	0.3
16	Energy	488	0.2
17	Household enterprise	431	0.2
18	Mining	347	0.2
19	Real estate	-	-
	Total	214,568	100

=== Agriculture ===
Agriculture and fishery in Nong Bua Lamphu province, the biggest sector of the economy, generated 7.656 billion baht (US$201 million) or 23.7% of GPP with a workforce of 98,474 (45.9% of all employed persons).

Agricultural land use 2,325 km^{2} (898 sq mi) is 60% of total land of Nong Bua Lamphu province 3,859 km^{2} (1,490 sq mi). This is divided as follows: paddy land: 1,216 km^{2} (470 sq mi) 52.3%, upland rice: 728 km^{2} (281 sq mi) 31.3%, orchard/perennial crop: 257 km^{2} (99 sq mi) 11.1%, farmland: 122 km^{2} (47 sq mi) 5.2% and vegetable/ornamental plant: 2 km^{2} (0.77 sq mi) 0.1%.

Production of the three main arable crops: rice 271,578 tonnes, barley 9,307 tonnes and maize 2,109 tonnes.

Production of the five main vegetable crops: specialty corns 2,197 tonnes, kohlrabi 1,277 tonnes, holy basil 854 tonnes, Chinese chive 631 tonnes and Okra 388 tonnes.

Production of the five main fruit crops: dragon fruit 629,500 tonnes, rambutan 539,419 tonnes; lady finger banana 258,990 tonnes, Java apple 156,618 tonnes and champedak 60,950 tonnes.

=== Animal husbandry ===
Livestock produced included: chickens 1,818,825, ducks 195,566, swines 81,558, beef cattle 64,137, buffalos 19,725, goats 10,829, dairy cattle 1,502 and sheep 181.

=== Fisheries ===
Total catch from 7,873 freshwater aquaculture farms amounted to 883,410 tonnes.

=== Manufacturing ===
The second sector of the economy generated 6.152 billion baht (US$162 million) or 19% of GPP with 5,362 registered entities and a workforce of 17,163 people (8% of all employed persons).

=== Trade ===
Wholesale and retail trade; repair of motor vehicles and motorcycles, the third sector of the economy generated 4.208 billion baht (US$111 million) or 13% of GPP with 6,485 registered entities and a workforce of 33,517 people (15.6%).

=== Transportation ===
Transportation with 14 companies and 2,997 people (5.5%) contributed 958 million baht (US$79 million) or 3% of GPP.

=== Construction ===
189 construction entities and a workforce of 11,868 people (5.5%) contributed 755 million baht (US$20 million) or 2.3% of GPP.

=== Accommodation and food service activities ===
107 registered hotels, restaurants and food service activities contributed 32 million baht (US$0.9 million) or 0.1 percent of GPP, with a workforce numbering 12,119 (5.6%).

== Human achievement index 2022 ==
Health	Education	Employment	Income
34	64	52	73
Housing	Family	Transport	Participation
20	13	18	76
Nong Bua Lamphu, with a 2022 HAI value of 0.6098 is "low", occupies place 75 in the ranking.

Since 2003, the United Nations Development Programme (UNDP) in Thailand has tracked progress on human development at the sub-national level using the Human achievement index (HAI), a composite index covering all the eight key areas of human development. The National Economic and Social Development Board (NESDB) has taken over this task since 2017.

Rank	Classification
1 – 13	"high"
14–29	"somewhat high"
30–45	"average"
46–61	"somewhat low"
62–77	"low"

Map with provinces and HAI 2022 rankings
