= 2023–24 Thai League Cup =

Hilux Revo Cup

Tournament details
- Country: Thailand
- Dates: 2 September 2023 – 16 June 2024
- Teams: 80

Final positions
- Champions: BG Pathum United (1st title)
- Runners-up: Muangthong United

Tournament statistics
- Matches played: 79
- Goals scored: 255 (3.23 per match)
- Top goal scorer(s): Chitsanuphong Phimpsang (6 goals)

Awards
- Best player: Kritsada Kaman

The 2023–24 Thai League Cup is the 14th season in the second era of a Thailand's knockout football competition. All games are played as a single match. It was sponsored by Toyota Motor Thailand, and known as the Hilux Revo Cup (Thai: ไฮลักซ์ รีโว่ คัพ) for sponsorship purposes, Hilux Revo is a truck model of Toyota. 80 clubs were accepted into the tournament, and it began with the first qualification round on 2 September 2023 and concluded with the final on 16 June 2024. The tournament has been readmitted back into Thai football after a 10-year absence. The prize money for this prestigious award is said to be around 5 million baht and the runners-up will be netting 1 million baht.

This is the first edition of the competition and the qualifying round will be played in regions featuring clubs from the Thai League 3.

== Calendar ==
Round	Date	Matches	Clubs	New entries this round
First qualification round	2–3 September 2023	14	28 → 14	28 2023–24 Thai League 3
Second qualification round	9–10 September 2023	18	14 + 22 → 18	22 2023–24 Thai League 3
Qualification play-off round	25 October 2023	16	18 + 14 → 16	14 2023–24 Thai League 2
First round	6 December 2023	16	16 + 16 → 16	16 2023–24 Thai League 1
Second round	13 March 2024	8	16 → 8	
Quarter-finals	11–24 April 2024	4	8 → 4	
Semi-finals	22 May 2024	2	4 → 2	
Final	16 June 2024	1	2 → Champions	
Total				80 clubs

== Results ==
Note: T1: Clubs from Thai League 1; T2: Clubs from Thai League 2; T3: Clubs from Thai League 3.

=== First qualification round ===
28 clubs from 2023–24 Thai League 3 have signed to first qualify in the 2023–24 Thai League cup. This round was drawn on 24 August 2023. 44 goals occurred in this round.

Northern region
The qualifying round would be played in the northern region featuring 6 clubs from the 2023–24 Thai League 3 Northern Region.

2 September 2023	Kamphaengphet (T3)	1–0 (a.e.t.)	Northern Nakhon Mae Sot United (T3)	Mueang, Kamphaengphet
15:00 (UTC+7)	Kaio Marques da Silva 108'	Report		Stadium: Cha Kung Rao Stadium; Attendance: 180; Referee: Chookiat Boonchoo; Assistant referees: Thanapon Kanchanaudom, Rattanapong Pansritanyarat; Fourth official: Bongkod Tiansavang

2 September 2023	Khelang United (T3)	0–1	Nakhon Sawan See Khwae City (T3)	Mueang, Lampang
15:00 (UTC+7)		Report	Vinícius Silva Freitas 10'	Stadium: Stadium of Lampang Rajabhat University; Attendance: 130; Referee: Supat Chaingam; Assistant referees: Pantachai Kantee, Saksit Jantain; Fourth official: Doungkaew Doungtawan

2 September 2023	Kongkrailas United (T3)	2–3 (a.e.t.)	Phitsanulok (T3)	Mueang, Sukhothai
17:00 (UTC+7)	Kunburus Sounses 84'; Samerpak Srinon 90+3' (pen.)	Report	Nonthaphut Panaimthon 9'; Chatchai Narkwijit 54'; Winai Aimoat 99'	Stadium: Thalay Luang Stadium; Referee: Chirawat Chomphoosee; Assistant referees: Suwit Kongtongnok, Phattharaphon Chaknam-arng; Fourth official: Tanyathon Phetch-udom

Northeastern region
The qualifying round would be played in the northeastern region featuring 4 clubs from the 2023–24 Thai League 3 Northeastern Region.

2 September 2023	Mahasarakham SBT (T3)	1–0	Sisaket United (T3)	Mueang, Mahasarakham
18:00 (UTC+7)	Panot Wiriyakul 20'	Report		Stadium: Mahasarakham Provincial Stadium; Attendance: 846; Referee: Komkrit Sawong; Assistant referees: Sutiwat Kaewkhunthong, Panuwat Kamba; Fourth official: Pisal Motongsri

3 September 2023	Suranaree Black Cat (T3)	2–1 (a.e.t.)	Khon Kaen (T3)	Mueang, Nakhon Ratchasima
15:00 (UTC+7)	Watcharapong Nuangprakaew 23'; Sitthiphot Seesen 120' (pen.)	Report	Jose Magson Bezerra Dourado 41'	Stadium: Stadium of Suranaree University of Technology; Attendance: 107; Referee: Suparak Nilkad; Assistant referees: Phattaradanai Jaisue, Nutthawat Kongsuwan; Fourth official: Chanatip Meechai

Eastern region
The qualifying round would be played in the eastern region featuring 6 clubs from the 2023–24 Thai League 3 Eastern Region.

2 September 2023	Marines (T3)	0–1 (a.e.t.)	Navy (T3)	Sattahip, Chonburi
15:00 (UTC+7)		Report	Sirichai Phumpat 107'	Stadium: Sattahip Navy Stadium; Attendance: 160; Referee: Poomnapat Athan; Assistant referees: Adisai Pongnairat, Chaiwat Rupsa-at; Fourth official: Panya Nawasimainam

2 September 2023	Pluakdaeng United (T3)	1–1 (a.e.t.) (3–4 p)	Chachoengsao Hi-Tek (T3)	Pluak Daeng, Rayong
15:00 (UTC+7)	Jakkarin Yaukyen 78'	Report	Kongpon Ployprapai 81'	Stadium: CK Stadium; Attendance: 250; Referee: Somsuk Poosomnuek; Assistant referees: Wararit Suwanjira, Siravich Konngam; Fourth official: Nararit Srivorakul
	Penalties
	Suppasek Kaikaew (penalty scored); Warut Trongkratok (penalty scored); Prin Prathummet (penalty missed); Kittichai Martsala (penalty missed); Bernard Owusu Mintah (penalty scored); Siraphop Dechakul (penalty missed)		(penalty scored) Patiroop Sunjonlord; (penalty missed) Teeranan Saenta; (penalty scored) Kongpon Ployprapai; (penalty scored) Sutanan Aemon; (penalty missed) Guy Hubert; (penalty scored) Panussak Klongkamnuenkan

2 September 2023	Bankhai United (T3)	2–0	Chanthaburi United (T3)	Ban Khai, Rayong
18:00 (UTC+7)	Tishan Tajahni Hanley 59'; Sirisak Foofung 90+4'	Report		Stadium: Wai Krong Stadium; Attendance: 150; Referee: Niruch Panjontuk; Assistant referees: Ekkalak Muangkhotr, Kodcharat Rattanachot; Fourth official: Kanakorn Teansawat

Western region
The qualifying round would be played in the western region featuring 6 clubs from the 2023–24 Thai League 3 Western Region.

3 September 2023	Hua Hin City (T3)	0–4	Rajpracha (T3)	Hua Hin, Prachuap Khiri Khan
15:00 (UTC+7)		Report	Nattawut Namthip 34'; Kueanun Junumpai 40'; Samuel Erik Strong 90'; Eakkanut Kongket 90+5'	Stadium: Hua Hin Municipal Stadium; Attendance: 87; Referee: Chayanan Tuto; Assistant referees: Adisak Thongmaha, Yanin Nanthakampira; Fourth official: Weeraphong Chaiyasuk

3 September 2023	Maraleina (T3)	2–2 (a.e.t.) (3–2 p)	Lopburi City (T3)	Khlong Luang, Pathum Thani
15:00 (UTC+7)	Watcharapol Phothanom 90+5', 99'	Report	Lucas Gaudencio Moraes 44'; Monchit Wanna 103'	Stadium: Stadium of Valaya Alongkorn Rajabhat University under the Royal Patronage; Attendance: 214; Referee: Saravut Suksalee; Assistant referees: Patcharapon Losomsup, Arna Rattanabumchum; Fourth official: Arun Budtasee
	Penalties
	Keron Ornchaiyaphum (penalty scored); Tanakorn Ngamdee (penalty missed); Songran Pungnoy (penalty scored); Sutin Iamsa-ard (penalty missed); Chitsanuphong Phimpsang (penalty scored)		(penalty scored) Lucas Gaudencio Moraes; (penalty missed) Chumpol Seekhiao; (penalty missed) Monchit Wanna; (penalty missed) Sirichai Lamphuttha; (penalty scored) Piravich Aroonrat

3 September 2023	Saraburi United (T3)	2–1	Thap Luang United (T3)	Mueang, Saraburi
18:00 (UTC+7)	Haraan Hajazan Gonçalves Barbosa 25'; Prasit Pattanatanawisut 72'	Report	Kenta Aso 35'	Stadium: Saraburi PAO. Stadium; Attendance: 642; Referee: Yuttana Sadkrathok; Assistant referees: Pichaya Kasem, Kittichok Huthip; Fourth official: Kittichai Huthip

Southern region
The qualifying round would be played in the southern region featuring 2 clubs from the 2023–24 Thai League 3 Southern Region.

3 September 2023	Phuket Andaman (T3)	2–3	MH Nakhon Si City (T3)	Mueang, Phuket
18:00 (UTC+7)	Jefferson Mateus Quirino Rodrigues 19'; Diogo Pereira 76'	Report	Esoh Omogba 28'; Edson dos Santos Costa Júnior 63', 65'	Stadium: Surakul Stadium; Attendance: 197; Referee: Artit Srinoy; Assistant referees: Metawin Chujit, Phongsiri Chusi; Fourth official: Jaruwat Sinprommas

Bangkok metropolitan region
The qualifying round would be played in the Bangkok metropolitan region featuring 4 clubs from the 2023–24 Thai League 3 Bangkok Metropolitan Region.

3 September 2023	AUU Inter Bangkok (T3)	2–5	Thonburi United (T3)	Minburi, Bangkok
15:00 (UTC+7)	Siriwat Sinturak 37'; Tanasorn Janthrakhot 90+4'	Report	Kittipong Seanphong 5', 45+2'; Ramiro Lizaso 41' (pen.); Bright Friday 63', 73'	Stadium: 72nd Anniversary Stadium; Attendance: 151; Referee: Pichit Thongjanmoon; Assistant referees: Theerapon Nonthakhamjan, Ritthiphong Phimpapan; Fourth official: Suthipong Teekhasuk

3 September 2023	Nonthaburi United (T3)	0–5	Prime Bangkok (T3)	Bang Yai, Nonthaburi
17:00 (UTC+7)		Report	Bouda Henry Ismaël 3', 65'; Chawanwit Saelao 43', 60'; Aekkaphong Phlmankasemsri 62'	Stadium: Nonthaburi Provincial Stadium; Attendance: 215; Referee: Aidsara Gaedthai; Assistant referees: Tibeth Longtree, Ukrit Bung-or; Fourth official: Anocha Praphatson

=== Second qualification round ===
The second qualifying round would feature 14 clubs that were the winners of the first qualification round and the new entries that were 22 clubs from the 2023–24 Thai League 3. 71 goals occurred in this round.

Northern region
The qualifying round would be played in the northern region featuring 4 clubs from the 2023–24 Thai League 3 Northern Region.

9 September 2023	Phitsanulok (T3)	3–2	Nakhon Sawan See Khwae City (T3)	Mueang, Phitsanulok
15:00 (UTC+7)	Chatchai Narkwijit 31', 47'; Elivélton de Araújo Rego 77'	Report	Vinícius Silva Freitas 36'; Piyaruck Kwangkaew 65'	Stadium: Phitsanulok PAO. Stadium; Attendance: 323; Referee: Tanavit Prompet; Assistant referees: Suthipong Ontuwong, Michai Changhirai; Fourth official: Chirawat Chomphoosee

9 September 2023	Kamphaengphet (T3)	3–2	Uttaradit Saksiam (T3)	Mueang, Kamphaengphet
15:00 (UTC+7)	Kawin Nuanthat 48'; Abbo Bouba 84', 87'	Report	Mammad Guliyev 21'; Tochio Yodthong 66'	Stadium: Cha Kung Rao Stadium; Attendance: 150; Referee: Tanyathon Phetch-udom; Assistant referees: Thanapon Kanchanaudom, Phichayut Noitathong; Fourth official: Chookiat Boonchoo

Northeastern region
The qualifying round would be played in the northeastern region featuring 6 clubs from the 2023–24 Thai League 3 Northeastern Region.

9 September 2023	Khon Kaen Mordindang (T3)	8–2	Surin Khong Chee Mool (T3)	Mueang, Khon Kaen
15:00 (UTC+7)	Tanapol Srithong 23', 25', 55'; Chetsadaporn Makkharom 29'; Kritsana Khanwong 33'; Athapon Songsuk 80'; Pakawat Wongsrikaew 83'; Phanu Wanchuphloed 90+3'	Report	Mongkhon Sukhawasana 39'; Possawat Wichaiwong 79' (o.g.)	Stadium: Stadium of Khon Kaen University; Attendance: 257; Referee: Rutratchapoom Moolpong; Assistant referees: Sirichai Leepon, Mongkol Uthainang; Fourth official: Natthaphong Saengsuwannarat

9 September 2023	Rasisalai United (T3)	1–2	Udon United (T3)	Mueang, Sisaket
15:00 (UTC+7)	Wichit Kongsinkaew 7'	Report	Niwat Nonkao 5'; João Paulo 80'	Stadium: Sisaket Provincial Stadium; Attendance: 250; Referee: Palakon Hasuk; Assistant referees: Watcharachat Loumpool, Payao Khuankhanueng; Fourth official: Theerapong Baokham

9 September 2023	Mahasarakham SBT (T3)	2–0	Suranaree Black Cat (T3)	Mueang, Mahasarakham
18:00 (UTC+7)	Ramon Mesquita 6'; Phurewat Aunthong 77'	Report		Stadium: Mahasarakham Provincial Stadium; Attendance: 512; Referee: Sittisak Kaewkam; Assistant referees: Nakarin Thongkerd, Panuwat Kamba; Fourth official: Apisit Yotayut

Eastern region
The qualifying round would be played in the eastern region featuring 8 clubs from the 2023–24 Thai League 3 Eastern Region.

9 September 2023	Navy (T3)	1–0	Saimit Kabin United (T3)	Sattahip, Chonburi
15:00 (UTC+7)	Prawit Bureeted 12'	Report		Stadium: Sattahip Navy Stadium; Attendance: 200; Referee: Booncharoen Phochai; Assistant referees: Narit Mungtoemklang, Palakorn Parasatit; Fourth official: Chinnaphat Lablae

9 September 2023	Fleet (T3)	0–0 (a.e.t.) (7–6 p)	Prachinburi City (T3)	Sattahip, Chonburi
15:00 (UTC+7)		Report		Stadium: Battleship Stadium; Attendance: 155; Referee: Pornthep Promsopa; Assistant referees: Chaiwat Rupsa-at, Poomin Lanamtaing; Fourth official: Niruch Panjontuk
	Penalties
	Pakkaphon Phengsuay (penalty scored); Phongpeera Prajongsai (penalty scored); Suraphon Potha (penalty missed); Phanuwit Jitsanoh (penalty missed); Jakrayut Vivatvanit (penalty scored); Panuwat Kongchan (penalty scored); Bollawat Chaisoda (penalty scored); Andayut Nimnuch (penalty scored); Chawalit Waenthong (penalty scored)		(penalty missed) Pornchai Teakprakhon; (penalty scored) Kittikoon Pawong; (penalty scored) Chaiyawat Thungkrathok; (penalty scored) Bannawit Seanbuapho; (penalty missed) Phatthadon Charoenchit; (penalty scored) Piyapan Chantroon; (penalty scored) Nattawut Promsri; (penalty scored) Mathawin Chueanun; (penalty missed) Abdulkordiri Hamid

9 September 2023	Chachoengsao Hi-Tek (T3)	0–0 (a.e.t.) (5–4 p)	BFB Pattaya City (T3)	Mueang, Chachoengsao
18:00 (UTC+7)		Report		Stadium: Chachoengsao Municipality Stadium; Attendance: 495; Referee: Theerapon Nakthong; Assistant referees: Ekkalak Muangkhotr, Apidet Rawangton; Fourth official: Chayapol Laosuphan
	Penalties
	Patiroop Sunjonlord (penalty scored); Nyamsi Jacques Dominique (penalty scored); Yodsaporn In-thong (penalty scored); Thanawat Dechkla (penalty scored); Sirisak Romphothong (penalty scored)		(penalty scored) Kanok Tapsai; (penalty scored) Mekmongkhon Bunmi; (penalty missed) Aekkarat Maneekhot; (penalty scored) Aleksandr Shurchilin; (penalty scored) Rittichai Thobpuak

9 September 2023	Bankhai United (T3)	2–1	ACDC (T3)	Ban Khai, Rayong
18:00 (UTC+7)	Chokchai Sukthed 4'; Tishan Tajahni Hanley 50'	Report	Natchapol Jitkasem 84'	Stadium: Wai Krong Stadium; Attendance: 150; Referee: Poomnapat Athan; Assistant referees: Adisai Pongnairat, Theerayut Radarit; Fourth official: Watcharit Longjit

Western region
The qualifying round would be played in the western region featuring 4 clubs from the 2023–24 Thai League 3 Western Region.

9 September 2023	Rajpracha (T3)	4–1	Saraburi United (T3)	Thawi Watthana, Bangkok
15:00 (UTC+7)	Nattawut Namthip 6'; Sosuke Kimura 19'; Kueanun Junumpai 23'; Samuel Erik Strong 90+4'	Report	Haraan Hajazan Gonçalves Barbosa 45+4'	Stadium: Stadium of Bangkok Thonburi University; Attendance: 270; Referee: Kittichai Huthip; Assistant referees: Pichaya Kasem, Narapat Nittayachat; Fourth official: Arthit Lanongkhan

10 September 2023	Maraleina (T3)	7–2	PTU Pathum Thani (T3)	Khlong Luang, Pathum Thani
15:00 (UTC+7)	Chitsanuphong Phimpsang 4', 42', 51', 53', 65', 90+1'; Jittiphat Wasungnoen 44'	Report	Ali Jafarian 76'; Eric Kumi 90'	Stadium: Stadium of Valaya Alongkorn Rajabhat University under the Royal Patronage; Attendance: 111; Referee: Arun Budtasee; Assistant referees: Kittichok Huthip, Patcharapon Losomsup; Fourth official: Yoottapong Riyasarn

Southern region
The qualifying round would be played in the southern region featuring 8 clubs from the 2023–24 Thai League 3 Southern Region.

10 September 2023	Satun (T3)	4–0	Ranong United (T3)	Mueang, Satun
15:00 (UTC+7)	Ibrohem Adam 23'; Kittiphong Khetpara 32', 42'; Douglas Mineiro 86'	Report		Stadium: Satun PAO. Stadium; Attendance: 950; Referee: Matoha Sayo; Assistant referees: Waranyu Janhor, Satira Yunyongkait; Fourth official: Manop Lempan

10 September 2023	Wiang Sa Surat Thani City (T3)	0–2	Pattani (T3)	Wiang Sa, Surat Thani
15:00 (UTC+7)		Report	Mairon Natan Pereira Maciel Oliveira 2'; Lionel Frank Touko Nzola 34'	Stadium: Ban Song Municipality Stadium; Attendance: 150; Referee: Anon Lohlor; Assistant referees: Masobree Awer, Faosan Wangsoh; Fourth official: Jiraphan Yodphut

10 September 2023	MH Nakhon Si City (T3)	2–1	Muang Trang United (T3)	Ron Phibun, Nakhon Si Thammarat
16:00 (UTC+7)	Omogba Esoh 63'; Edson dos Santos Costa Júnior 90+1'	Report	Arnon Panmeethong 42'	Stadium: Nakhon Si Thammarat PAO. Stadium; Attendance: 600; Referee: Montree Yeereem; Assistant referees: Kiadtisak Waianasen, Charin Kalamad; Fourth official: Pornsak Paksan

10 September 2023	Songkhla (T3)	4–3	Phatthalung (T3)	Mueang, Songkhla
17:00 (UTC+7)	Anwa Alimama 6'; Basree Sanron 26', 52'; Victor Clemente de Oliveira Capinan 90+2'	Report	Jhonatan Bernardo 47' (pen.), 57'; Thammayut Rakbun 80'	Stadium: Tinsulanon Stadium; Attendance: 659; Referee: Nattawut Sangpan; Assistant referees: Hafit Chamnian, Phipat Kongchamnan; Fourth official: Pornchai Anupan

Bangkok metropolitan region
The qualifying round would be played in the Bangkok metropolitan region featuring 6 clubs from the 2023–24 Thai League 3 Bangkok Metropolitan Region.

9 September 2023	Bangkok (T3)	2–1	Kasem Bundit University (T3)	Thung Khru, Bangkok
18:00 (UTC+7)	Carlos Eduardo dos Santos Lima 47'; Woraphot Somsang 90+2'	Report	Chinonso Kingsley Thomas 67'	Stadium: 72nd Anniversary Stadium, Bang Mot; Attendance: 350; Referee: Thapana Thaworn; Assistant referees: Padsakorn Jaihom, Watchara Wongkhan; Fourth official: Anocha Praphatson

10 September 2023	Thonburi United (T3)	2–2 (a.e.t.) (5–6 p)	Prime Bangkok (T3)	Nong Khaem, Bangkok
15:00 (UTC+7)	Bright Friday 64', 112'	Report	Chawanwit Saelao 25'; Natthapong Promorn 120+3'	Stadium: Thonburi Stadium; Referee: Dassakhon Hokla; Assistant referees: Sujin Rodart, Nanthawat Chobsuan; Fourth official: Thaweesak Thounthong
	Penalties
	Ramiro Lizaso (penalty scored); Tanasrap Srikotapach (penalty missed); Bright Friday (penalty scored); Sirakorn Pimbaotham (penalty scored); Natthawut Puangdao (penalty scored); Sirimongkon Khunpanperng (penalty scored); Flodyn Ruchelvy Ulrich Baloki (penalty missed)		(penalty missed) Alexander Philip Dominic Tkacz; (penalty scored) Abdulrahman Kelani A.K. Essadi; (penalty scored) Chaithat Maneein; (penalty scored) Natthapong Promorn; (penalty scored) Bouda Henry Ismaël; (penalty scored) Poppol Zeemadee; (penalty scored) Phoovanet Sutharos

10 September 2023	Samut Sakhon City (T3)	3–2	The iCON RSU (T3)	Mueang, Samut Sakhon
15:00 (UTC+7)	Arthit Sunthornphit 20' (pen.); Alex Mermoz Djatche Nandje 35', 76'	Report	Ahmadi Joupari Ali 50' (pen.); Poonsak Jakpa 57'	Stadium: Stadium of Thailand National Sports University, Samut Sakhon Campus; Attendance: 440; Referee: Suthipong Teekhasuk; Assistant referees: Natthakit Konfu, Arpaporn Thaisoda; Fourth official: Pichit Thongjanmoon

=== Qualification play-off round ===
The qualification play-off round would feature 18 clubs that were the winners of the second qualification round and the new entries that were 14 clubs from the 2023–24 Thai League 2. This round was drawn on 3 October 2023. 35 goals occurred in this round.

25 October 2023	Kamphaengphet (T3)	0–0 (a.e.t.) (5–6 p)	Lampang (T2)	Mueang, Kamphaengphet
15:00 (UTC+7)		Report		Stadium: Cha Kung Rao Stadium; Attendance: 30; Referee: Woottipong Ketkam; Assistant referees: Apichat Prasasak, Songrit Trakulchai; Fourth official: Samrit Ritkaew
	Penalties
	Kawin Nuanthat (penalty scored); Natthaphon Yueayai (penalty scored); Anek Sonsudjai (penalty scored); Natthawut Khlipthong (penalty missed); Kaio Marques da Silva (penalty scored); Jirasak Kunnapan (penalty scored); Eakkarin Harnwang (penalty missed)		(penalty scored) Luan Santos; (penalty missed) Lim Jae-hyuk; (penalty scored) Pannathon Mungmai; (penalty scored) Athipat Saengprakai; (penalty scored) Chatchon Jairangsee; (penalty scored) Woramat Roopngam; (penalty scored) Anuchit Somphakdee

25 October 2023	Prime Bangkok (T3)	1–0	Chiangmai United (T2)	Bang Kapi, Bangkok
15:00 (UTC+7)	Lars William Kvist 73'	Report		Stadium: Stadium of Ramkhamhaeng University; Attendance: 350; Referee: Komgrit Ponpasit; Assistant referees: Sahatnet Deemongkol, Kiadtisak Janmol; Fourth official: Kriangkrai Thiphanunjarukorn

25 October 2023	Navy (T3)	1–0	Chanthaburi (T2)	Sattahip, Chonburi
15:00 (UTC+7)	Sirimongkhon Jitbanjong 27'	Report		Stadium: Sattahip Navy Stadium; Attendance: 230; Referee: Pongthep Raipimai; Assistant referees: Suriya Lee-intr, Pakorn Srichumsin; Fourth official: Sila Jinnigorn

25 October 2023	Khon Kaen Mordindang (T3)	1–1 (a.e.t.) (3–4 p)	Nongbua Pitchaya (T2)	Mueang, Khon Kaen
15:00 (UTC+7)	Pakawat Wongsrikaew 120+2'	Report	Kento Nagasaki 116'	Stadium: Stadium of Khon Kaen University; Attendance: 389; Referee: Vitsawa Nanchana; Assistant referees: Athasit Kaewhiang, Tharanon Naowapan; Fourth official: Jarin Yawapee
	Penalties
	Tanapol Srithong (penalty missed); Thammarat Sukumam (penalty scored); Chetsadaporn Makkharom (penalty scored); Possawat Wichaiwong (penalty scored); Tirapong Siripan (penalty missed)		(penalty scored) Kento Nagasaki; (penalty scored) Nilson; (penalty scored) Wutthichai Marom; (penalty scored) Jakkrit Songma

25 October 2023	Udon United (T3)	2–0	Customs United (T2)	Mueang, Udon Thani
15:00 (UTC+7)	Pitipong Wongbut 10'; Sorathorn Chainamuang 58'	Report		Stadium: Stadium of Thailand National Sports University, Udon Thani Campus; Attendance: 247; Referee: Kanoksak Khiaodaeng; Assistant referees: Nattapong Wadweangcom, Manuschai Chawong; Fourth official: Natthwut Nammuang

25 October 2023	Maraleina (T3)	0–1	Nakhon Si United (T2)	Khlong Luang, Pathum Thani
15:00 (UTC+7)		Report	Pedro Paulo 73'	Stadium: Stadium of Valaya Alongkorn Rajabhat University under the Royal Patronage; Attendance: 105; Referee: Wicharn Klinthaworn; Assistant referees: Khomchalach Lekhawijit, Pathompong Anunluksanakul; Fourth official: Putthipong Issising

25 October 2023	Fleet (T3)	0–1	Samut Prakan City (T2)	Sattahip, Chonburi
15:00 (UTC+7)		Report	Thanadon Supaphon 72'	Stadium: Battleship Stadium; Attendance: 98; Referee: Ekkachai Phetcham; Assistant referees: Chaiyos Sripak, Watcharasak Intharak; Fourth official: Peeratat Kittikanmetee

25 October 2023	Satun (T3)	2–1	Dragon Pathumwan Kanchanaburi (T2)	Mueang, Satun
16:00 (UTC+7)	Douglas Mineiro 20'; Kittiphong Khetpara 22'	Report	Elisio Batista da Conceição Júnior 90+2'	Stadium: Satun PAO. Stadium; Attendance: 1,970; Referee: Phairot Bunkamnoed; Assistant referees: Jareon Nunboon, Abdulrohim Sitiloh; Fourth official: Nakarin Kanantai

25 October 2023	Rajpracha (T3)	1–2 (a.e.t.)	Pattaya United (T2)	Bang Yai, Nonthaburi
16:00 (UTC+7)	Samuel Erik Strong 90+6'	Report	Peemwit Thongnitiroj 83'; Phufah Chuenkomrak 113'	Stadium: Nonthaburi Stadium; Attendance: 170; Referee: Alongkorn Khonwai; Assistant referees: Banpot Khunhong, Siwat Chaithong; Fourth official: Chaikrit Inboonsong

25 October 2023	MH Nakhon Si City (T3)	3–1	Chachoengsao Hi-Tek (T3)	Ron Phibun, Nakhon Si Thammarat
16:00 (UTC+7)	Omogba Esoh 59'; Siwakorn Kidkayan 64'; Edson dos Santos Costa Júnior 85'	Report	Phuwadol Soma 62'	Stadium: Nakhon Si Thammarat PAO. Stadium; Attendance: 150; Referee: Iffan Phanwang; Assistant referees: Suwit Kaewrod, Waranyu Janhor; Fourth official: Pornsak Paksan

25 October 2023	Pattani (T3)	0–1	Kasetsart (T2)	Mueang, Pattani
16:30 (UTC+7)		Report	Sittirak Kerdkhumthong 45'	Stadium: Pattani PAO. Stadium; Attendance: 1,849; Referee: Paisan Bendem-alee; Assistant referees: Hanyot Buangrab, Pornchai Kongdamni; Fourth official: Nasri Tamat

25 October 2023	Songkhla (T3)	3–1 (a.e.t.)	Suphanburi (T2)	Mueang, Songkhla
17:00 (UTC+7)	Thanet Suknate 67' (o.g.); Apichat Eaidsrichay 110'; Sanan Samala 115'	Report	Danusorn Wijitpunya 31'	Stadium: Tinsulanon Stadium; Attendance: 548; Referee: Sapuding Kalong; Assistant referees: Phitsanu Chusi, Phongsiri Chusi; Fourth official: Matoha Sayo

25 October 2023	Samut Sakhon City (T3)	1–0	Nakhon Ratchasima Mazda (T2)	Mueang, Samut Sakhon
17:00 (UTC+7)	Cedrick Platini Kaham 78'	Report		Stadium: Stadium of Thailand National Sports University, Samut Sakhon Campus; Attendance: 230; Referee: Pawara Seejen; Assistant referees: Verayut Kunkure, Poramin Yoopensuk; Fourth official: Kristin Saisombat

25 October 2023	Mahasarakham SBT (T3)	3–1	Chiangmai (T2)	Mueang, Mahasarakham
18:00 (UTC+7)	Wanit Jaisaen 46'; Nattapon Thaptanon 81'; Ramon Mesquita 84'	Report	Amornthep Maundee 30'	Stadium: Mahasarakham Provincial Stadium; Attendance: 949; Referee: Amnat Makklang; Assistant referees: Thinakorn Daensamsuan, Watcharachat Loumpool; Fourth official: Peerasan Krataithong

25 October 2023	Phitsanulok (T3)	2–3	Bangkok (T3)	Mueang, Phitsanulok
18:00 (UTC+7)	Winai Aimoat 5'; Natthawut Nueamai 27'	Report	Wichaya Pornprasart 38'; Woraphot Somsang 48'; Phootran Gingpan 74'	Stadium: Phitsanulok PAO. Stadium; Attendance: 448; Referee: Chitchanuphong Ketsana; Assistant referees: Jarin Champakpriew, Khachonphong Singthana; Fourth official: Siwakorn Singthana

25 October 2023	Bankhai United (T3)	1–1 (a.e.t.) (4–3 p)	Rayong (T2)	Ban Khai, Rayong
18:00 (UTC+7)	Chokchai Sukthed 81'	Report	Lwin Moe Aung 72'	Stadium: Wai Krong Stadium; Attendance: 449; Referee: U-sen Yala; Assistant referees: Anucha Pinamon, Sarayut Sriampri; Fourth official: Atiwat Seelalo
	Penalties
	Tishan Tajahni Hanley (penalty scored); Tawan Huntumlay (penalty scored); Ndlovu Mandlenkosi (penalty scored); Aphirak Suankan (penalty missed); Chokchai Sukthed (penalty scored)		(penalty missed) Hiromichi Katano; (penalty scored) Tiago Chulapa; (penalty scored) Ryoma Ito; (penalty scored) Lwin Moe Aung; (penalty missed) Wasusiwakit Phusirit

=== First round ===
The first round would feature 16 clubs that were the winners of the qualification play-off round including 6 clubs from T2 and 10 clubs from T3 and the new entries that were 16 clubs from the 2023–24 Thai League 1. This round was drawn on 3 November 2023. 58 goals occurred in this round.

6 December 2023	Navy (T3)	1–6	PT Prachuap (T1)	Sattahip, Chonburi
15:00 (UTC+7)	Sirimongkhon Jitbanjong 25'	Report	Prasid Jantum 20'; Tamer Seyam 54', 72'; Chutipol Thongthae 81', 90'; Samuel 83'	Stadium: Sattahip Navy Stadium; Attendance: 67; Referee: Anusorn Nookaew; Assistant referees: Wirot Lokham, Poramin Yoopensuk; Fourth official: Ekkachai Phetcham

6 December 2023	MH Nakhon Si City (T3)	0–3	Lamphun Warriors (T1)	Mueang, Nakhon Si Thammarat
16:00 (UTC+7)		Report; Highlight	Mohammed Osman 45+3'; Anan Yodsangwal 56'; Sila Srikampang 90+2'	Stadium: Stadium of Nakhon Si Thammarat Rajabhat University; Attendance: 2,850; Referee: Wiwat Jumpaoon; Assistant referees: Rachain Srichai, Yossapon Tongprom; Fourth official: Kristin Saisombat

6 December 2023	Prime Bangkok (T3)	0–1	Sukhothai (T1)	Bang Kapi, Bangkok
15:00 (UTC+7)		Report; Highlight	Rafael Galhardo 62'	Stadium: Stadium of Ramkhamhaeng University; Attendance: 320; Referee: Niwat Insa-ard; Assistant referees: Vichet Getkaew, Banpot Khunhong; Fourth official: Komgrit Ponpasit

6 December 2023	Udon United (T3)	2–4	Buriram United (T1)	Mueang, Udon Thani
15:00 (UTC+7)	Kittiphong Pluemjai 44', 57'	Report; Highlight	Natthaphon Wisetchat 6' (o.g.); Nicolao Dumitru 13' (pen.); Kim Min-hyeok 75'; Peeradon Chamratsamee 89' (pen.)	Stadium: Stadium of Thailand National Sports University, Udon Thani Campus; Attendance: 949; Referee: Noppadet Mangngam; Assistant referees: Pattarapong Kijsathit, Chaiya Sripak; Fourth official: Prakasit Chantarasawang

6 December 2023	Satun (T3)	2–0 (a.e.t.)	Nakhon Pathom United (T1)	Mueang, Satun
16:00 (UTC+7)	Douglas Mineiro 105', 112'	Report		Stadium: Satun PAO. Stadium; Attendance: 3,180; Referee: Natee Choosuwan; Assistant referees: Binla Preeda, Jareon Nunboon; Fourth official: Peerasan Krataithong

6 December 2023	Samut Sakhon City (T3)	1–4	BG Pathum United (T1)	Mueang, Samut Sakhon
17:00 (UTC+7)	Arthit Sunthornphit 43'	Report; Highlight	Teerasil Dangda 55' (pen.); Danilo Alves 59', 74'; Shinnaphat Leeaoh 62'	Stadium: Stadium of Thailand National Sports University, Samut Sakhon Campus; Attendance: 1,125; Referee: Pawara Seejen; Assistant referees: Chotrawee Tongduang, Srisuwan Boonnum; Fourth official: Akom Charoensuk

6 December 2023	Kasetsart (T2)	0–2	Trat (T1)	Chatuchak, Bangkok
17:00 (UTC+7)		Report; Highlight	Lidor Cohen 62'; Nattawut Sombatyotha 78'	Stadium: Insee Chantarasatit Stadium; Attendance: 320; Referee: Chaikrit Inboonsong; Assistant referees: Komsan Kampan, Kasama Loyma; Fourth official: Wittaya Junejan

6 December 2023	Nongbua Pitchaya (T2)	1–2	Khon Kaen United (T1)	Mueang, Nongbua Lamphu
17:30 (UTC+7)	Aleksandar Kapisoda 20'	Report	Brenner 15', 50'	Stadium: Pitchaya Stadium; Attendance: 1,332; Referee: Sivakorn Pu-udom; Assistant referees: Tuwae-yusoh Kuji, Watcharasak Intharak; Fourth official: Atiwat Seelalo

6 December 2023	Songkhla (T3)	5–2	Police Tero (T1)	Mueang, Songkhla
18:00 (UTC+7)	Ekene Victor Azike 15'; Anwa A-leemama 50'; Basree Sanron 55'; Sanan Samala 63'; Nobparut Raksachum 79'	Report; Highlight	Maxx Creevey 19'; Marc Landry Babo 65'	Stadium: Tinsulanon Stadium; Attendance: 1,054; Referee: Kotchapoom Meesridaecha; Assistant referees: Suriya Lee-intr, Thanet Jairaw; Fourth official: Sapuding Kalong

6 December 2023	Bangkok (T3)	1–6	Port (T1)	Thung Khru, Bangkok
18:00 (UTC+7)	Wichaya Pornprasart 10'	Report; Highlight	Tanasith Siripala 9'; Chanukun Karin 43'; Kevin Deeromram 47'; Barros Tardeli 49'; Bordin Phala 89'; Supakorn Nutvijit 90+2' (o.g.)	Stadium: 72nd Anniversary Stadium, Bang Mot; Attendance: 2,500; Referee: Thapakorn Thongkon; Assistant referees: Watthana Chonchanakul, Phubes Lekpha; Fourth official: Phadoongkiat Piangdee

6 December 2023	Bankhai United (T3)	0–1	Chiangrai United (T1)	Ban Khai, Rayong
18:00 (UTC+7)		Report; Highlight	Fellipe Cabral Veloso dos Santos 21'	Stadium: Wai Krong Stadium; Attendance: 300; Referee: Veeraporn Maophaeo; Assistant referees: Narin Wongprapipak, Anucha Pinamon; Fourth official: U-sen Yala

6 December 2023	Mahasarakham SBT (T3)	0–3	Bangkok United (T1)	Mueang, Mahasarakham
18:00 (UTC+7)		Report; Highlight	Chayawat Srinawong 23'; Chananan Pombuppha 55'; Amadou Soukouna 84'	Stadium: Mahasarakham Provincial Stadium; Attendance: 2,567; Referee: Phairot Bunkamnoed; Assistant referees: Rachan Dawangpa, Sarayut Sriampri; Fourth official: Jirawit Phonkaew

6 December 2023	Lampang (T2)	1–4	Muangthong United (T1)	Mueang, Lampang
18:00 (UTC+7)	Chatri Rattanawong 90'	Report; Highlight	Stefan Šćepović 4', 69'; Jaroensak Wonggorn 67'; Chatchon Jairangsee 83' (o.g.)	Stadium: Lampang Provincial Stadium; Attendance: 1,515; Referee: Chaireag Ngam-som; Assistant referees: Worapong Prasartsri, Poonsawat Samransuk; Fourth official: Panumas Phansamo

6 December 2023	Nakhon Si United (T2)	0–2	Ratchaburi (T1)	Mueang, Nakhon Si Thammarat
18:30 (UTC+7)		Report	Njiva Rakotoharimalala 14', 69'	Stadium: Nakhon Si Thammarat Provincial Stadium; Attendance: 1,220; Referee: Winat Phophat; Assistant referees: Teerapon Sunyapluem, Hanyot Buangrab; Fourth official: Paisan Bendem-alee

6 December 2023	Pattaya United (T2)	0–2	Uthai Thani (T1)	Bang Lamung, Chonburi
19:00 (UTC+7)		Report	Nontapat Naksawat 90+2'; Ricardo Santos 90+4'	Stadium: Nong Prue Stadium; Attendance: 1,210; Referee: Satchukorn Saenchu; Assistant referees: Tanin Reunjit, Kantrakorn Ngaosri; Fourth official: Kriangkrai Thiphanunjarukorn

6 December 2023	Chonburi (T1)	2–0	Samut Prakan City (T2)	Mueang, Chonburi
19:00 (UTC+7)	Murilo 55'; Amadou Ouattara 73'	Report; Highlight		Stadium: Chonburi UTA Stadium; Attendance: 2,542; Referee: Alongkorn Khonwai; Assistant referees: Apichit Nophuan, Natthaphon Mala; Fourth official: Pongthep Raipimai

=== Second round ===
The second round would feature 16 clubs that were the winners of the first round including 14 clubs from T1 and 2 clubs from T3. This round was drawn on 12 February 2024. 30 goals occurred in this round.

13 March 2024	Satun (T3)	1–3	Muangthong United (T1)	Mueang, Satun
16:00 (UTC+7)	Lee Jae-sung 89' (o.g.)	Report	Teeraphol Yoryoei 39', 45+2'; Thanawat Suengchitthawon 90+2'	Stadium: Satun PAO. Stadium; Attendance: 4,533; Referee: Chaireag Ngam-som; Assistant referees: Worapong Prasartsri, Tuwae-yusoh Kuji; Fourth official: Paisan Bendem-alee

13 March 2024	PT Prachuap (T1)	0–2	Port (T1)	Mueang, Prachuap Khiri Khan
18:00 (UTC+7)		Report; Highlight	Barros Tardeli 39', 90+5'	Stadium: Sam Ao Stadium; Attendance: 1,760; Referee: Satchukorn Saenchu; Assistant referees: Apichit Nophuan, Watthana Chonchanakul; Fourth official: Kristin Saisombat

13 March 2024	Ratchaburi (T1)	1–0	Bangkok United (T1)	Mueang, Ratchaburi
18:00 (UTC+7)	Tyronne del Pino 61'	Report; Highlight		Stadium: Dragon Solar Park; Attendance: 3,379; Referee: Wiwat Jumpaoon; Assistant referees: Rawut Nakarit, Chaowalit Poonprasit; Fourth official: Alongkorn Khonwai

13 March 2024	Khon Kaen United (T1)	4–1 (a.e.t.)	Trat (T1)	Mueang, Khon Kaen
18:00 (UTC+7)	Tawin Butsombat 24'; Jakkit Palapon 93'; Brenner 95', 109'	Report; Highlight	Santipap Ratniyorm 89'	Stadium: Khon Kaen PAO. Stadium; Attendance: 2,813; Referee: Natee Choosuwan; Assistant referees: Rachain Srichai, Chaiya Sripak; Fourth official: Jirawit Phonkaew

13 March 2024	Lamphun Warriors (T1)	3–2 (a.e.t.)	Sukhothai (T1)	Mueang, Lamphun
18:00 (UTC+7)	Akarapong Pumwiset 22'; Dennis Murillo 61'; Tauã Ferreira dos Santos 117' (pen.)	Report; Highlight	Jakkapong Polmart 39'; Kritsana Kasemkulvilai 68'	Stadium: Mae Guang Stadium; Attendance: 2,396; Referee: Kotchapoom Meesridaecha; Assistant referees: Pattarapong Kijsathit, Waranyoo Chomgoson; Fourth official: Woottipong Ketkam

13 March 2024	Songkhla (T3)	0–4	Chiangrai United (T1)	Mueang, Songkhla
19:00 (UTC+7)		Report; Highlight	Rodriguinho 39'; Montree Promsawat 63'; Ronnayod Mingmitwan 82'; Fellipe Cabral Veloso dos Santos 87'	Stadium: Tinsulanon Stadium; Attendance: 872; Referee: Winat Phophat; Assistant referees: Chotrawee Tongduang, Poonsawat Samransuk; Fourth official: Putthipong Issising

13 March 2024	Chonburi (T1)	1–4	BG Pathum United (T1)	Mueang, Chonburi
19:00 (UTC+7)	Amadou Ouattara 6'	Report	Jakkapan Praisuwan 9'; Ikhsan Fandi 39'; Teerasil Dangda 76'; Sarach Yooyen 88'	Stadium: Chonburi UTA Stadium; Attendance: 5,129; Referee: Phairot Bunkamnoed; Assistant referees: Komsan Kampan, Tanin Reunjit; Fourth official: Vitsavet Sangnakorn

13 March 2024	Buriram United (T1)	2–2 (a.e.t.) (3–1 p)	Uthai Thani (T1)	Mueang, Buriram
19:00 (UTC+7)	Thanakrit Chotmuangpak 45+1'; Guilherme Bissoli 80'	Report; Highlight	Jiloan Hamad 57'; Charalampos Charalampous 86'	Stadium: Chang Arena; Attendance: 14,933; Referee: Warintron Sassadee; Assistant referees: Tanate Chuchuen, Natthaphon Mala; Fourth official: Akom Charoensuk
	Penalties
	Guilherme Bissoli (penalty scored); Peeradon Chamratsamee (penalty scored); Kenny Dougall (penalty scored)		(penalty missed) Brinner; (penalty missed) Ricardo Santos; (penalty scored) Muhammatsapwan Klipkaeo; (penalty missed) Ben Davis

=== Quarter-finals ===
The quarter-finals would feature 8 clubs that were the winners of the second round, all are clubs from T1. This round was drawn on 28 March 2024. 11 goals occurred in this round.

11 April 2024	Khon Kaen United (T1)	1–1 (a.e.t.) (4–5 p)	Muangthong United (T1)	Mueang, Khon Kaen
19:00 (UTC+7)	Tawin Butsombat 109'	Report; Highlight	Teeraphol Yoryoei 104'	Stadium: Khon Kaen PAO. Stadium; Attendance: 3,667; Referee: Songkran Bunmeekiart; Assistant referees: Chotrawee Tongduang, Worapong Prasartsri; Fourth official: Chaireag Ngam-som
	Penalties
	Tawin Butsombat (penalty scored); Lossémy Karaboué (penalty scored); Ernesto Amantegui Phumipha (penalty missed); David Cuerva (penalty scored); Shunya Suganuma (penalty scored)		(penalty scored) Willian Popp; (penalty scored) Kotaro Omori; (penalty scored) Tristan Do; (penalty scored) Kannarin Thawornsak; (penalty scored) Poramet Arjvirai

24 April 2024	Chiangrai United (T1)	1–2	Port (T1)	Mueang, Chiangrai
18:00 (UTC+7)	Miguel Bianconi 13'	Report; Highlight	Bordin Phala 18'; Noboru Shimura 69'	Stadium: Singha Chiangrai Stadium; Attendance: 3,691; Referee: Songkran Bunmeekiart; Assistant referees: Pattarapong Kijsathit, Komsan Kampan; Fourth official: Noppadet Mangngam

24 April 2024	Ratchaburi (T1)	0–3	BG Pathum United (T1)	Mueang, Ratchaburi
18:30 (UTC+7)		Report; Highlight	Danilo Alves 8'; Chanathip Songkrasin 85', 89'	Stadium: Dragon Solar Park; Attendance: 2,722; Referee: Chaireag Ngam-som; Assistant referees: Tanate Chuchuen, Chotrawee Tongduang; Fourth official: Natee Choosuwan

24 April 2024	Buriram United (T1)	2–1 (a.e.t.)	Lamphun Warriors (T1)	Mueang, Buriram
19:00 (UTC+7)	Guilherme Bissoli 72'; Dion Cools 119'	Report; Highlight	Akarapong Pumwiset 88'	Stadium: Chang Arena; Attendance: 14,862; Referee: Warintron Sassadee; Assistant referees: Apichit Nophuan, Rachain Srichai; Fourth official: Thapakorn Thongkon

=== Semi-finals ===
The semi-finals would feature 4 clubs that were the winners of the quarter-finals, all are clubs from T1. This round was drawn on 2 May 2024. 5 goals occurred in this round.

22 May 2024	BG Pathum United (T1)	2–1	Port (T1)	Mueang, Ratchaburi
18:00 (UTC+7)	Ikhsan Fandi 41'; Freddy Álvarez 62'	Report; Highlight	Frans Putros 75'	Stadium: Dragon Solar Park; Attendance: 4,112; Referee: Wiwat Jumpaoon; Assistant referees: Chotrawee Tongduang, Komsan Kampan; Fourth official: Winat Phophat

22 May 2024	Buriram United (T1)	0–2	Muangthong United (T1)	Thanyaburi, Pathum Thani
19:00 (UTC+7)		Report; Highlight	Kakana Khamyok 53'; Jaroensak Wonggorn 88'	Stadium: BG Stadium; Attendance: 11,970; Referee: Torphong Somsing; Assistant referees: Rawut Nakarit, Worapong Prasartsri; Fourth official: Niwat Insa-ard

=== Final ===
The final would feature 2 clubs that were the winners of the semi-finals, both are clubs from T1. 1 goal occurred in this round.

16 June 2024	BG Pathum United (T1)	1–0	Muangthong United (T1)	Khlong Luang, Pathum Thani
18:00 (UTC+7)	Teerasil Dangda 90+8'	Report		Stadium: Thammasat Stadium; Attendance: 15,755; Referee: Sivakorn Pu-udom; Assistant referees: Rawut Nakarit, Komsan Kampan; Fourth official: Wiwat Jumpaoon

== Tournament statistics ==
=== Top goalscorers ===
Rank	Player	Club	Goals
1	(Thailand) Chitsanuphong Phimpsang	Maraleina	6
2	(Brazil) Brenner	Khon Kaen United	4
2	(Brazil) Edson dos Santos Costa Júnior	MH Nakhon Si City	4
2	(Brazil) Douglas Mineiro	Satun	4
2	(Nigeria) Bright Friday	Thonburi United	4
6	(Brazil) Danilo Alves	BG Pathum United	3
6	(Thailand) Teerasil Dangda	BG Pathum United	3
6	(Thailand) Tanapol Srithong	Khon Kaen Mordindang	3
6	(Thailand) Teeraphol Yoryoei	Muangthong United	3
6	(Thailand) Chatchai Narkwijit	Phitsanulok	3
6	(Brazil) Barros Tardeli	Port	3
6	(Thailand) Chawanwit Saelao	Prime Bangkok	3
6	(United States) Samuel Erik Strong	Rajpracha	3
6	(Thailand) Kittiphong Khetpara	Satun	3
6	(Thailand) Basree Sanron	Songkhla	3

=== Hat-tricks ===
Player	For	Against	Result	Date	Round
(Thailand) Tanapol Srithong	Khon Kaen Mordindang (T3)	Surin Khong Chee Mool (T3)	8–2 (H)	9 September 2023	Second qualification round
(Thailand) Chitsanuphong Phimpsang^{6}	Maraleina (T3)	PTU Pathum Thani (T3)	7–2 (H)	10 September 2023	Second qualification round

Notes: ^{6} = Player scored 6 goals; (H) = Home team; (A) = Away team

== See also ==
- 2023–24 Thai League 1
- 2023–24 Thai League 2
- 2023–24 Thai League 3
- 2023–24 Thai League 3 Northern Region
- 2023–24 Thai League 3 Northeastern Region
- 2023–24 Thai League 3 Eastern Region
- 2023–24 Thai League 3 Western Region
- 2023–24 Thai League 3 Southern Region
- 2023–24 Thai League 3 Bangkok Metropolitan Region
- 2023–24 Thai League 3 National Championship
- 2023–24 Thai League 3 Cup
- 2023–24 Thai FA Cup
- 2023 Thailand Champions Cup
