= Tha Phra subdistrict =

Coordinates: 16.340480°N 102.801644°E

Tha Phra (Thai: ท่าพระ, pronounced [tʰâː pʰráʔ]; Northeastern Thai: ท่าพระ, pronounced [tʰāː pʰàʔ]) is a tambon (subdistrict) in Mueang Khon Kaen District, Khon Kaen Province, northeast Thailand (Isan).

== History ==
The name "Tha Phra" (literally: "Buddha pier") comes from the Isan word "Ta Phra" (ถ่าพระ) meaning "waiting for a monk".

Tha Phra's prosperity began around 1921–28 when the railway arrived here, an extension from neighbour Ban Phai District. This made this small locality become a passageway and a source of livelihood and homes for many people especially Chinese immigrants or Thai people of Chinese descent.

Most of the shops are in the form of wooden shophouses along Charoen Phanit Road or locally known as "Talat Rot Fai" (ตลาดรถไฟ, "railway market"). There are also other buildings such as movie theatre, Chinese opera house, vegan almshouse, rice mill, jute mill, cassava mill etc.

== Geography ==
The terrain is undulating slopes and hills are alternating with flat plains. There are the Chi River and Huai Chan as a boundary line. The main water resources are Huai Toei Reservoir, Chi River, and Huai Chan.

It is bounded by other subdistricts (from the north clockwise): Mueang Kao and Don Han in its district, Non Som Bun in Ban Haet District, and Don Han in its district again, with Nong Waeng in Phra Yuen District, respectively.

Tha Phra has a total area of approximately 55.5 square kilometers or 34,687.5 rai.

Tha Phra is a southern part of the district and is about 12 km (7.5 mi) from the downtown Khon Kaen on Highway 2 (Mittraphap Road) and about 433 km (269.1 mi) northeast of Bangkok.

== Administration ==
The entire area of Tha Phra is governed by two local government bodies: Subdistrict Administrative Organization Tha Phra (SAO Tha Phra), and Tha Phra Subdistrict Municipality.

It was also divided into 20 muban (village).
