= Non Sombun, Ban Haet =

Non Sombun โนนสมบูรณ์
- Tambon
- Non Sombun
- Interactive map of Non Sombun
- Coordinates: 16°16′25.4″N 102°46′38.6″E
- Country: Thailand
- Province: Khon Kaen
- District: Ban Haet

Government
  - Type: Subdistrict Administrative Organization (SAO)
  - Mayor: Sulapha Taothawong

Area
  - Total: 62 km^{2} (24 sq mi)

Population (2016)
  - Total: 9,337
- Time zone: UTC+7 (ICT)
- Postcode: 40110
- Area code: (+66) 02
- Geocode: 402403

Non Sombun (Thai: โนนสมบูรณ์, pronounced [nōːn sǒm.būːn]) is a tambon (subdistrict) of Ban Haet District, Khon Kaen Province, northeast Thailand (Isan). It is a hometown of Somluck Kamsing, a first Thai Olympic gold medalist.

== History ==
Originally, Non Sombun was a muban (village) of Ban Pao, Ban Phai District, south of Mueang Khon Kaen District, Khon Kaen capital district. Later in 1985, Non Sombun Subdistrict was officially established with the Non Sombun Subdistrict Council as an administrator.

In 1995, the king amphoe (กิ่งอำเภอ, "minor district") Ban Haet was established. So Non Sombun moved up directly to the newly established minor district. Later, on January 19, 1996, the Ministry of Interior established Subdistrict Administrative Organization Non Sombun (SAO Non Sombun) in the administrative network of Ban Haet District until the present.

== Geography ==
Non Sombun is the north part of the district, about 10 km (6.2 mi) from downtown Ban Haet. Its geography is a lowland alternating with some parts of the upland and some are the Chi river basins.

Neighbouring subdistricts are (from the north clockwise): Tha Phra in Mueang Khon Kaen District, Khwao Rai in Kosum Phisai District of Maha Sarakham Province, Ban Haet in its district, and Ban Ton in Phra Yuen District.

== Administration ==
The entire area is under the administration of Subdistrict Administrative Organization Non Sombun.

The area also consists of 12 administrative villages.

| No. | Name | Thai |
|---|---|---|
| 1. | Ban Non Sombun | บ้านโนนสมบูรณ์ |
| 2. | Ban Nong Kham | บ้านหนองขาม |
| 3. | Ban Nong Mex | บ้านหนองเม็ก |
| 4. | Ban Nong Kranuan | บ้านหนองกระหนวน |
| 5. | Ban Nong Phak Tob | บ้านหนองผักตบ |
| 6. | Ban Non Sombun | บ้านโนนสมบูรณ์ |
| 7. | Ban Si Samran | บ้านศรีสำราญ |
| 8. | Ban Non Tan | บ้านโนนทัน |
| 9. | Ban Non Sawan | บ้านโนนสวรรค์ |
| 10. | Ban Non Sombun | บ้านโนนสมบูรณ์ |
| 11. | Ban Non Sombun | บ้านโนนสมบูรณ์ |
| 12. | Ban Nong Kham | บ้านหนองขาม |

The seal of the subdistrict features elephant raising its trunk.
