= Marisol Deluna =

American fashion designer

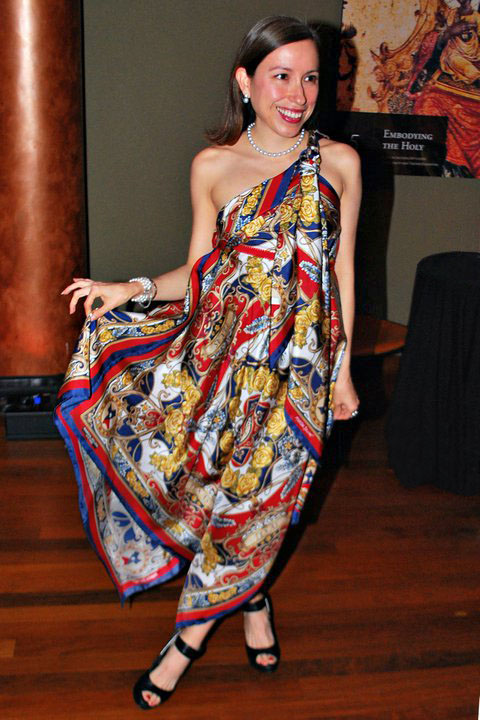
- Deluna in 2010
- Born: Marisol Luna; June 20, 1967 (age 58); San Antonio, Texas, U.S.
- Occupation: fashion designer
- Years active: 1989–present

Marisol Deluna is an American fashion designer based in New York City who specializes in screen-printed fashion accessories, apparel and home décor sold under the label Marisol Deluna New York.

== Early life ==
Born on June 20, 1967, to Rudolfo (Rudy) and Peggy Luna in San Antonio, Texas, Deluna uses her family's original Spanish surname. Her father is a retired aerial cartographer and mother is a museum docent. She grew up in the San Antonio suburb of Alamo Heights, and is one of six children.

Deluna is a graduate of Alamo Heights High School, an alumna of the Kansas City Art Institute and attended the Fashion Institute of Technology.

== Career ==
Her design career in New York's garment district began in 1989 with an entry-level position. In 1997, she began offering fashion accessories and made-to-order designs, followed with a lifestyle brand, adding apparel and home décor. Items are sold under the label Marisol Deluna New York. She uses colorful textiles, designed by hand, often relying on silk screen printing to produce them.

Her company's motto is "New York Designed. Texas Made." Her brand aims to promote manufacturing in the United States.

As a child, Deluna was a Girl Scout. She has continued her affiliation by creating official uniform accessories for the Girl Scouts of the USA.

During New York Fashion Week, Marisol cast Project Runway’s first transgender model, Mimi Tao. She embraces ethnic diversity and encourages her models to smile during shows.

Harlem milliner Rod Keenan is a longtime friend of Deluna, and has collaborated with her.

In 2012, Deluna received a commendation from the largest and oldest Hispanic organization in America, The League of United Latin American Citizens (LULAC) for her charitable outreach and professional achievement.

Marisol was inducted into the San Antonio Women's Hall of Fame in 2018 for her contribution to the arts.

== Foundation ==
The Marisol Deluna Foundation is a 501(c)(3) educational nonprofit which supports a fashion initiative for those interested in fashion and design arts in her home state of Texas. Since 2015, the foundation has been located in the La Villita Historic Arts Village in downtown San Antonio near the San Antonio River Walk.

The foundation's Linda Luna Duffy Creative Hope Initiative was created for the inclusion of those with special needs in artistic endeavors. Duffy was a public school educator and Deluna's older sister, who succumbed to ALS in 2017.

In 2018, the foundation hosted its inaugural community fashion show as an official "SA300" event in partnership with San Antonio to commemorate the city's Tricentennial.

== Personal life ==
Marisol is married to Jonathan Washburn Cole. The couple have no children and live in Lower Manhattan.

She is an alumna of Alpha Phi, member of the Fashion Institute of Technology Couture Council, is an executive member of Fashion Group International, is a supporter of Housing Works and has participated with a PSA for Dan Savage's It Gets Better Project.
