= Calypso Cabaret =

Thai transgender cabaret

- Calypso Cabaret logo
- Genre: Cabaret
- Show type: Resident
- Date of premiere: 1988
- Location: 2194 Charoen Krung Road, Wat Phraya Krai, Bang Kho Laem, Bangkok, Thailand

Creative team
- Director: Beer Sririta
- Official website

Calypso Cabaret (Thai: คาลิปโซ่ คาบาเร่ต์) is a Thai transgender cabaret. It is performed at the open-air mall Asiatique in Bangkok. Calypso Cabaret was founded in 1988 in a renovated movie theater on Sukhumvit Road. It relocated to the Ambassador Hotel theater in 1992 and later to Asia Hotel on Phaya Thai Road. It moved in 2012 to its current location, Asiatique on Charoen Krung Road. The show's director is German television actor Hans Hoenicke. According to The Nation, the company has achieved "international fame stardom" through consistently being called a "must do experience" in travel blogs, periodicals, and travel guides.

Publications have called the show's entertainers "kathoey", "ladyboy", "transgender", "transsexual", and "transvestite" performers. (Note: For "kathoey"; For "ladyboy"; For "transgender"; For "transsexual"; For "transvestite") With 16 acts during the show, the transgender performers lip sync and dance to songs. Calypso Cabaret features songs from a variety of genres including classical music, oldies, avant-garde music, rhythm and blues, and Thai ballads. There are Carmen Miranda and Marilyn Monroe impersonators. There is classical music from China, Japan, Korea, and Thailand.

Calypso Cabaret is billed as a family-friendly show with skilled performers who provide funny entertainment. The show's audience was largely Bangkok residents in the upper middle class and middle class with foreign holidaymakers making up a substantial portion. By 2000, foreign visitors had eclipsed Thai people, who no longer visited as much. The show received largely positive reviews. Commentators praised the ravishing costumes, the spirited dancing, and the excellent acting.

== History ==
Calypso Cabaret was established in 1988 and is Bangkok's earliest cabaret group. (Note: For Calypso Cabaret's being established in 1988; For Calypso Cabaret's being Bangkok's earliest cabaret group) The show was directed by Hans Hoenicke, who was a guest star in the 1970s German television shows Klimbim and Die Gimmicks. When it opened, shows were first held in a renovated movie theater on Sukhumvit Road. By 1992, Calypso Cabaret relocated from Sukhumvit Road's Soi 24 to Soi 11, where it put on shows at an Ambassador Hotel theater that seated 200 people. It later moved to the Asia Hotel on Phaya Thai Road. According to Dirk Weeber-Arayatumsopon of Pattaya Blatt, the theater looked like a 1930s–1940s American club. The room had red walls and carpets and glittering disco balls. The author Carl Parkes called the venue an "uncomfortably small auditorium".

Calypso Cabaret in September 2012 moved from Asia Hotel to the Calypso Bangkok Theatre in Asiatique's Warehouse 3 on Charoen Krung Road. The show is performed at the 540-seat Calypso Bangkok Theatre, which is 1,425 square metres (15,340 ft^{2}). The theater has tables with room for five people as well one-person seating. The ticket comes with an included beverage. The establishment has a 1,096-square-metre (11,800 ft^{2}) restaurant that can seat 200 people and houses its own stage. At the end of the show, viewers can take pictures with the cast for an additional charge.

Produced by Antony Thomas, the 2005 ITV documentary Middlesex begins with a profile of the show. A voice-over says, "At the Club Calypso the most fundamental distinction – man/ woman, falls away". During the 2008 Thai political crisis, protesters took over the Suvarnabhumi Airport for eight days, which severely impacted the tourism industry. According to Nipon Boonmasuwaran, who did sales management and marketing management for Calypso Cabaret, ticket sales had dropped by 90%, leading to fewer than 50 guests occupying a theater that had a capacity of 350. Aiming to get audience members to buy drinks, the company gave complimentary tickets in the thousands to people staying in the hotels who were stuck because they could not fly.

According to The Nation, the company has achieved "international fame stardom" through consistently being called a "must do experience" in travel blogs, periodicals, and travel guides. Transgender cabaret competitors in Bangkok include Mambo Cabaret and Playhouse Theater Cabaret. The Australian photographer Polixeni Papapetrou took photos of the drag queens at Calypso Cabaret in 1991. During her Born This Way Ball concert tour in 2012, Lady Gaga watched Calypso Cabaret. At her concert after watching the drag show, she said she was awed by how the Bangkok performers were able to be open about their identities.

Owing to the COVID-19 pandemic in Thailand, there were border shutdowns and international flight discontinuations, which caused ticket sales for Calypso Cabaret to drop. The cabaret stopped doing performances on 14 October 2020, instead repurposing the location for putting on events. After shows had been paused for two years, Calypso Cabaret resumed their shows in December 2022. The finals of the 2025 and 2026 editions of Miss Thailand International were held at Calypso Cabaret.

== Music and choreography ==
Calypso Cabaret features 16 acts. The show features songs from a diversity of genres. It has classical music, oldies, avant-garde music, rhythm and blues, and Thai ballads. The show features China's, Japan's, Korea's, and Thailand's classical music and attire. Go-go bars, well-known movies, songs, and ethnic stereotypes influence the show's numerous brief skits. Performers dance to a Chinese ballad containing heartrending scenes and a surprise ending. They put on the 20th-century Chinese song "Ye Shanghai", which a Posts & Telecommunications Press book called "full of charm". Another scene features the performers in traditional Korean attire, waving fans and doing Korean dances. Other songs feature Romani men with guitars, a geisha wielding large fans, and an ostrich plume-adorned Carmen Miranda. Chicago songs "All That Jazz" and "Hot Honey Rag"; "I Who Have Nothing"; the Korean folk song "Arirang"; and the Wonder Girls song "Nobody" are also performed. One scene featured the men and women wearing white while performing a Busby Berkeley dance.

An entertainer mimics Marilyn Monroe while wearing high-heeled shoes, a blonde wig, and a dress with silver sequin decorations. Suit-wearing men with black masks put diamond necklaces and bracelets on her. Admiring the gleaming accessories, the Monroe impersonator enthusiastically does lip-synced renditions of the songs "Diamonds Are a Girl's Best Friend" and "Material Girl". The scholar Reya Farber said the Monroe performance was "embodying glamorous consumption and an iteration of classic American femininity". At the beginning of a scene featuring the George Gershwin and Ira Gershwin song "They Can't Take That Away from Me", the transgender headliner is adorned in a bra, hose, and panties. Her ensemble consists of men who are wearing sunglasses, caps, and black military jackets. After the headliner swaps out her attire for a red military clothing and heels, the men swap out their attire for black-colored panties and bras. They all do the Charleston dance.

The Nation theater critic Pawit Mahasarinand praised the performers, writing "all the cast member[s] know how to act, showing the meanings of the lyrics of the songs they lip-synch through their facial expressions and physical movements". The author Wilfried Hahn said Calypso Cabaret had "opulent costuming and sophisticated staging and choreography", while Daily Mirror's Pippa Crerar wrote in that it was "surprisingly family friendly, with catchy (though mimed, sadly) show tunes, energetic dancing and flamboyant costumes". Marjorie Pravden of the Orlando Sentinel lauded the show for having "vaudevillelike acts with ribald humor, high-kicking chorus lines". Pattaya Blatt 's Dirk Weeber-Arayatumsopon said Calypso Cabaret distinguished itself from other cabarets through its "cheeky, frivolous presentation".

== Imagery ==
College of William & Mary sociology professor Reya Farber said the Tourism Authority of Thailand (TAT) was using transgender cabaret shows like Calypso Cabaret to change the image of tourist places seen as being seedy. TAT's website said that instead of pushing disreputable services, the cabarets provide funny entertainment. Farber found that Calypso Cabaret contributed to the positive perception through its promotional materials that say the performance is "suitable to open-minded audiences of all ages and nationalities" and that the entertainers "highly valued class, style and taste" and "rigorously trained and educated". The Rutgers University scholar Jillana Beth Enteen considered Calypso Cabaret to be a family-friendly show owing to its talented entertainers and expertly designed outfits.

The National University of Singapore scholar Qian Hui Tan said that Calypso Cabaret's kathoey performers have felt that their bodies are debased to being "oddities on display", while their dancing has been debased to being "freak shows". Tan cited Pui, a Calypso Cabaret performer, who said that viewers do not view the entertainers as women because the cabaret is billed as a "men dancing in women's clothes" spectacle. She criticized the marketing for overlooking their being skilled, disciplined entertainers through highlighting their gender variance. According to Pui, the marketing inaccurately portrays them to foreign viewers as "just a group of men who dress in women’s clothes and prance about the place". Pui further lamented that the foreign viewers have a preconceived notion that as not being "real" women, the kathoey performers will have blemishes. The viewers try to find performers who still have male traits. She said, "Some members of the audience are so taken back, they look as if they have seen a ghost. I don't know whether it is because they didn't expect us to look this bad or this good." Tan, the scholar, stated that kathoeys may be pioneering activism for "erotic justice" and gender equality, citing Pui who said, "every performance in Calypso is like a battle to gain respect for our third gender".

== Audience ==
Of Calypso Cabaret's audience in 1992, Bangkok residents in the upper middle class and middle class made up over half and farang holidaymakers made up a substantial portion. The academic Jillana Beth Enteen found that the Thai people's having substantial representation in the audience demonstrated that kathoeys were recognized by the Thais as entertainers. In a shift, the Bangkok Post reported in 2000 that not as many Thai people watched the show as foreign visitors. The Nation's Pawit Mahasarinand in 2015 called Calypso Cabaret a show for non-Thai tourists that was inapplicable to Thai viewers. Mahasarinand said audience members are incorrectly influenced into thinking the show exemplifies modern Thai theater. In the late 2000s, European customers, particularly the Dutch and the Belgians, made up a significant portion of their customer base. Asian customers including from South Korea, Japan, and Singapore, also comprised a substantial part of the audience. The Stars and Stripes' called Calypso Cabaret "the family-friendly Disney World of drag shows".

== Notable performers ==
The Thai fashion model Mimi Tao performed at Calypso Cabaret for several months and resigned after determining she was not interested in the role. Angele Anang, the winner of Drag Race Thailand's season 2, got her start in the entertainment industry as a Calypso Cabaret dancer.

== Reception ==
The Nation theater critic Pawit Mahasarinand praised the show, writing, "Most scenes have fun twists here and there that are either cheekily surprising or hilariously grotesque. There's also a nice contrast in moods and tones from one scene to the next, and that, coupled with quick scene changes and practical props, keeps the whole 75-minute show moving along at a fine pace." He said that although Calypso Bangkok caters to foreigners, Thai people are also able to feel enthralled and honored by it. In a positive review, a Taiwanese guide book about Bangkok said, "The dancers used their beautiful bodies to transcend gender and played each role vividly, which made people cheer loudly."

Calling the show "terrific entertainment", the Orlando Sentinel's Marjorie Pravden said Calypso Cabaret was "alternately funny, sensitive and outrageous" and "challenges one's own perspective on gender identification". The Bangkok Post's Mick Shippen called the show "a fabulously camp show". In a mixed review, Business Day theater critic Katy Chance criticized the "poor personal grooming" in which the entertainers did not sufficiently "shave, pluck or wax". Chance said that although the show had "the most spectacularly bad dancing" she had ever viewed, she found that "the sheer scale of the event was commendable" and enjoyed "the spirit of fun and celebration of the whole evening". She praised the numerous costume switches in the big cast and the stage crew's "excellent lighting" and good music timing.

The National Geographic Society's Phil MacDonald said the show was "wildly spectacular", while The Thaiger's Alessio Francesco Fedeli called it "a very vibrant and entertaining drag show". The author Charles Agar found the show to be "more creative than the standard drag parades at cabarets in Phuket or Pattaya". In a positive review, a Hachette Livre guidebook said, "The beautiful costumes are not by Donald Cadwell but they could have been. Libertine friend, be careful, the show is eminently soft and good-natured and the candor competes with naivety as they say in three-baht novels. That said, it's quite funny."

== Bibliography ==
- Aldous, Susan; Sereemongkonpol, Pornchai (2008). "Pui: Cabaret Girl". Ladyboys: The Secret World of Thailand's Third Gender. Bangkok: Maverick House. pp. 64–65, 91–92. ISBN 978-1-905379-48-4 – via Internet Archive.
- Tan, Qian Hui (22 April 2014). "Orientalist obsessions: fabricating hyper-reality and performing hyperfemininity in Thailand's kathoey tourism". Annals of Leisure Research. 17 (2): 148–150. doi:10.1080/11745398.2014.906312. S2CID 144446342.
