= Mancha Khiri district =

Mancha Khiri มัญจาคีรี
- District
- District location in Khon Kaen province
- Coordinates: 16°7′36″N 102°32′32″E
- Country: Thailand
- Province: Khon Kaen
- Seat: Kut Khao

Area
  - Total: 735.825 km^{2} (284.104 sq mi)

Population (2005)
  - Total: 72,244
  - Density: 98.2/km^{2} (254/sq mi)
- Time zone: UTC+7 (ICT)
- Postal code: 40160
- Geocode: 4017

Mancha Khiri (Thai: มัญจาคีรี, pronounced [mān.tɕāː khīː.rīː]; Northeastern Thai: มัญจาคีรี, pronounced [ma᷇n.tɕāː kʰi᷇ː.li᷇ː]) is a district (amphoe) in the southern part of Khon Kaen province, northeastern Thailand.

== Geography ==
Neighboring districts are (from the north clockwise): Nong Ruea, Ban Fang, Phra Yuen, Ban Haet, Ban Phai, Chonnabot, Khok Pho Chai of Khon Kaen Province; Kaeng Khro and Ban Thaen of Chaiyaphum province.

== History ==
The district was renamed from Kut Khao to Mancha Khiri in 1939.

== Administration ==
The district is divided into eight subdistricts (tambons), which are further subdivided into 116 villages (mubans). Mancha Khiri is a township (thesaban tambon) and covers parts of tambon Kut Khao. There are a further eight tambon administrative organizations (TAO).

No.	Name	Thai name	Villages	Pop.
1.	Kut Khao	กุดเค้า	17	12,775
2.	Suan Mon	สวนหม่อน	14	7,885
3.	Nong Paen	หนองแปน	16	9,109
4.	Phon Phek	โพนเพ็ก	14	7,957
5.	Kham Khaen	คำแคน	13	9,162
6.	Na Kha	นาข่า	17	9,919
7.	Na Ngam	นางาม	14	7,885
10.	Tha Sala	ท่าศาลา	11	7,552

Missing numbers belong to subdistricts which now form Khok Pho Chai District.
