= Non Sila district =

Non Sila โนนศิลา
- District
- District location in Khon Kaen province
- Coordinates: 15°58′26″N 102°40′9″E
- Country: Thailand
- Province: Khon Kaen
- Seat: Non Sila

Area
  - Total: 182.601 km^{2} (70.503 sq mi)

Population (2005)
  - Total: 25,987
  - Density: 142.3/km^{2} (369/sq mi)
- Time zone: UTC+7 (ICT)
- Postal code: 40110
- Geocode: 4025

Non Sila (Thai: โนนศิลา, pronounced [nōːn sì.lāː]; Northeastern Thai: โนนศิลา, pronounced [nôːn sȉ.lâː]) is a district (amphoe) of Khon Kaen province, northeastern Thailand.

== History ==
The minor district was established on 15 July 1996 by splitting it from Ban Phai district.

On 15 May 2007, all 81 minor districts were upgraded to full districts. With publication in the Royal Gazette on 24 August the upgrade became official.

== Geography ==
Neighboring districts are (from the north clockwise) Ban Phai, Nong Song Hong, Phon, and Chonnabot.

== Economy ==
As of 2019, Thai sugar giant, the Mitr Phol Group, plans to construct a sugarcane mill and biomass power plant in the district. The initiative will occupy 4,000 rai (640 ha; 1,600 acres) of three of the province's neighbouring districts: Non Sila, Ban Phai, and Chonnabot. The operation will form part of the Ban Phai Bio-Hub Industrial Estate and is linked to the Eastern Economic Corridor (EEC) project. Mitr Phol's plans have been met with some opposition from local residents. Mitr Phol has pledged that the factory will have no adverse environmental effects.

== Administration ==
The district is divided into five sub-districts (tambons), which are further subdivided into 45 villages (mubans). The township (thesaban tambon) Non Sila covers parts of tambons Non Sila and Ban Han. There are a further four tambon administrative organizations (TAO), the non-municipal area of tambon Non Sila is administered by a tambon administration (TA).

No.	Name	Thai name	Villages	Pop.
1.	Non Sila	โนนศิลา	7	4,180
2.	Nong Pla Mo	หนองปลาหมอ	8	4,536
3.	Ban Han	บ้านหัน	15	10,292
4.	Pueai Yai	เปือยใหญ่	8	3,403
5.	Non Daeng	โนนแดง	7	3,576
