= Waeng Yai district =

Waeng Yai แวงใหญ่
- District
- District location in Khon Kaen province
- Coordinates: 15°57′34″N 102°32′52″E
- Country: Thailand
- Province: Khon Kaen
- Seat: Waeng Yai

Area
  - Total: 189.069 km^{2} (73.000 sq mi)

Population (2005)
  - Total: 29,424
  - Density: 155.6/km^{2} (403/sq mi)
- Time zone: UTC+7 (ICT)
- Postal code: 40330
- Geocode: 4013

Waeng Yai (Thai: แวงใหญ่, pronounced [wɛ̄ːŋ jàj], Northeastern Thai: แวงใหญ่ pronounced [wɛ̂ːŋ ɲāj]) is a district (amphoe) of Khon Kaen province, northeastern Thailand.

== Geography ==
Neighboring districts are (from the north clockwise): Khok Pho Chai, Chonnabot, Phon, and Waeng Noi of Khon Kaen Province; Khon Sawan of Chaiyaphum province.

== History ==
The minor district (king amphoe) Waeng Yai was established on 3 January 1977, when the three tambons Khon Chim, Non Thong, and Mai Na Phiang were split off from Phon district. It was upgraded to a full district on 26 May 1980.

== Administration ==
The district is divided into five subdistricts (tambons), which are further subdivided into 50 villages (mubans). Waeng Yai is a township (thesaban tambon) which covers tambon Wang Yai. There are a further four tambon administrative organizations (TAO).

No.	Name	Thai name	Villages	Pop.
1.	Khon Chim	คอนฉิม	9	4,673
2.	Mai Na Phiang	ใหม่นาเพียง	14	7,912
3.	Non Thong	โนนทอง	11	5,588
4.	Waeng Yai	แวงใหญ่	7	5,259
5.	Non Sa-at	โนนสะอาด	9	5,992
