= Chonnabot district =

Chonnabot ชนบท
- District
- District location in Khon Kaen province
- Coordinates: 16°5′18″N 102°37′18″E
- Country: Thailand
- Province: Khon Kaen
- Seat: Chonnabot

Area
  - Total: 404.29 km^{2} (156.10 sq mi)

Population (2005)
  - Total: 48,756
  - Density: 120.6/km^{2} (312/sq mi)
- Time zone: UTC+7 (ICT)
- Postal code: 40180
- Geocode: 4018

Chonnabot (Thai: ชนบท, pronounced [tɕʰōn.nā.bòt]; Northeastern Thai: ซนบท, pronounced [so᷇n.nā.bǒt]) is a district (amphoe) of Khon Kaen province, northeastern Thailand.

== History ==
Mueang Chonbot (ชลบถ) was established at the beginning of the Rattanakosin era of around 1783. Its center was at Ban Nong Kong Kaeo. In 1914, it was converted to a district. In 1943 it was downgraded to be part of Ban Phai district. In 1966, the district was re-established, consisting of tambons Chonnabot, Kut Phia Khom, Ban Thaen, and Wang Saeng.

== Geography ==
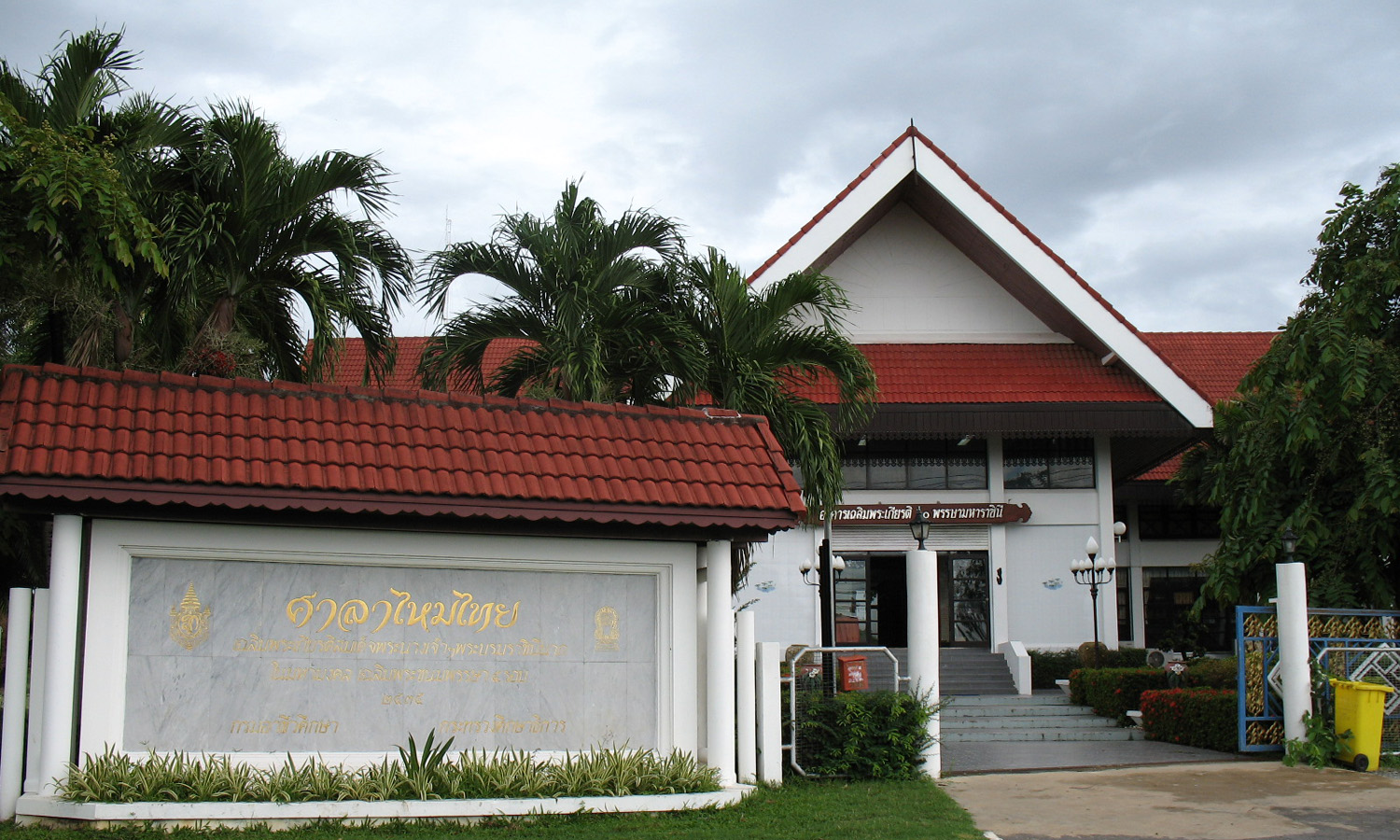
Thai Silk Cottage

Neighboring districts are (from the north clockwise): Mancha Khiri, Ban Phai, Non Sila, Phon, Waeng Yai and Khok Pho Chai.

== Economy ==
As of 2019, Thai sugar giant, the Mitr Phol Group, plans to construct a sugarcane mill and biomass power plant in the district. The initiative will occupy 4,000 rai (640 ha; 1,600 acres) of three of the province's neighbouring districts: Chonnabot, Ban Phai, and Non Sila. The operation will form part of the Ban Phai Bio-Hub Industrial Estate and is linked to the Eastern Economic Corridor (EEC) project. Mitr Phol's plans have been met with some opposition from local residents. Mitr Phol has pledged that the factory will have no adverse environmental effects.

== Administration ==
The district is divided into eight subdistricts (tambons), which are further subdivided into 80 villages (mubans). Chonnabot is a township (thesaban tambon) which covers parts of tambons Chonnabot and Si Bun Rueang. There are a further eight tambon administrative organizations (TAO).

No.	Name	Thai name	Villages	Pop.
1.	Chonnabot	ชนบท	13	9338
2.	Kut Phia Khom	กุดเพียขอม	7	3815
3.	Wang Saeng	วังแสง	11	7362
4.	Huai Kae	ห้วยแก	9	5805
5.	Ban Thaen	บ้านแท่น	8	4365
6.	Si Bun Rueang	ศรีบุญเรือง	12	6792
7.	Non Phayom	โนนพะยอม	10	6328
8.	Po Daeng	ปอแดง	10	4951
