= Khok Pho Chai district =

Khok Pho Chai โคกโพธิ์ไชย
- District
- District location in Khon Kaen province
- Coordinates: 16°5′1″N 102°23′56″E
- Country: Thailand
- Province: Khon Kaen
- Seat: Ban Khok

Area
  - Total: 238.824 km^{2} (92.210 sq mi)

Population (2005)
  - Total: 25,483
  - Density: 106.7/km^{2} (276/sq mi)
- Time zone: UTC+7 (ICT)
- Postal code: 40160
- Geocode: 4022

Khok Pho Chai (Thai: โคกโพธิ์ไชย, pronounced [kʰôːk pʰōː tɕʰāj]; Northeastern Thai: โคกโพธิ์ไชย, pronounced [kʰôːk pʰo᷇ː sa᷇j]) is a district (amphoe) of Khon Kaen province, northeastern Thailand.

== History ==
The minor district (king amphoe) was established on 30 April 1994 by splitting it from Mancha Khiri district.

On 15 May 2007, all 81 minor districts were upgraded to full districts. On 24 August the upgrade became official.

== Geography ==
Neighboring districts are (from the north clockwise): Mancha Khiri, Chonnabot, and Waeng Yai of Khon Kaen Province; Khon Sawan and Kaeng Khro of Chaiyaphum province.

== Administration ==
The district is divided into four subdistricts (tambons), which are further subdivided into 40 villages (mubans). The township (thesaban tambon) Ban Khok covers parts of tambon Ban Khok. There are a further four tambon administrative organizations (TAO).

No.	Name	Thai name	Villages	Pop.
1.	Ban Khok	บ้านโคก	11	7,141
2.	Pho Chai	โพธิ์ไชย	10	7,404
3.	Sap Sombun	ซับสมบูรณ์	11	6,401
4.	Na Phaeng	นาแพง	8	4,537
