= Ban Fang district =

Ban Fang บ้านฝาง
- District
- District location in Khon Kaen province
- Coordinates: 16°27′12″N 102°38′18″E
- Country: Thailand
- Province: Khon Kaen
- Seat: Ban Fang

Area
  - Total: 334.0 km^{2} (129.0 sq mi)

Population (2005)
  - Total: 52,999
  - Density: 158.7/km^{2} (411/sq mi)
- Time zone: UTC+7 (ICT)
- Postal code: 40270
- Geocode: 4002

Ban Fang (Thai: บ้านฝาง, pronounced [bâːn fǎːŋ]) is a district (amphoe) of Khon Kaen province, northeastern Thailand.

== History ==
The minor district (king amphoe) Ban Fang was established on 1 May 1975 by splitting off four tambons: Nong Bua, Pa Wai Nang, Ban Lao, and Non Khong from Mueang Khon Kaen district. On 25 March 1979 it was upgraded to a full district.

== Geography ==
Neighboring districts are (from the north clockwise): Ubolratana, Mueang Khon Kaen, Phra Yuen, Mancha Khiri, and Nong Ruea.

== Administration ==
The district is divided into seven sub-districts (tambons), which are further subdivided into 74 villages (mubans). The township (thesaban tambon) Ban Fang covers parts of tambon Ban Fang. There are a further seven tambon administrative organizations (TAO).

No.	Name	Thai name	Villages	Pop.
1.	Nong Bua	หนองบัว	11	6,962
2.	Pa Wai Nang	ป่าหวายนั่ง	9	7,856
3.	Non Khong	โนนฆ้อง	10	6,055
4.	Ban Lao	บ้านเหล่า	13	10,133
5.	Pa Manao	ป่ามะนาว	9	6,173
6.	Ban Fang	บ้านฝาง	12	10,296
7.	Khok Ngam	โคกงาม	10	5,524
