= Khon Kaen =

Khon Kaen ขอนแก่น
- City Municipality
- City of Khon Kaen เทศบาลนครขอนแก่น
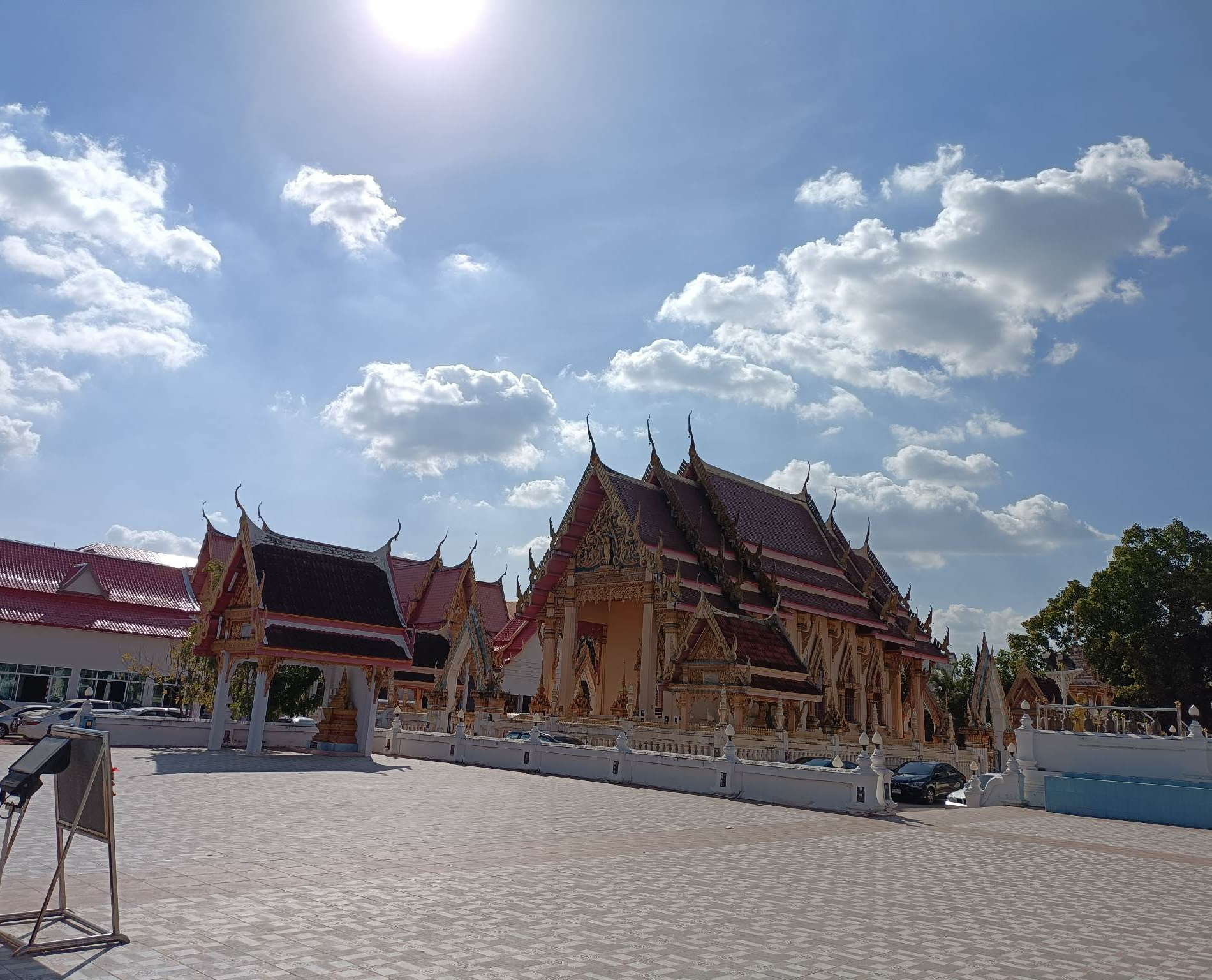
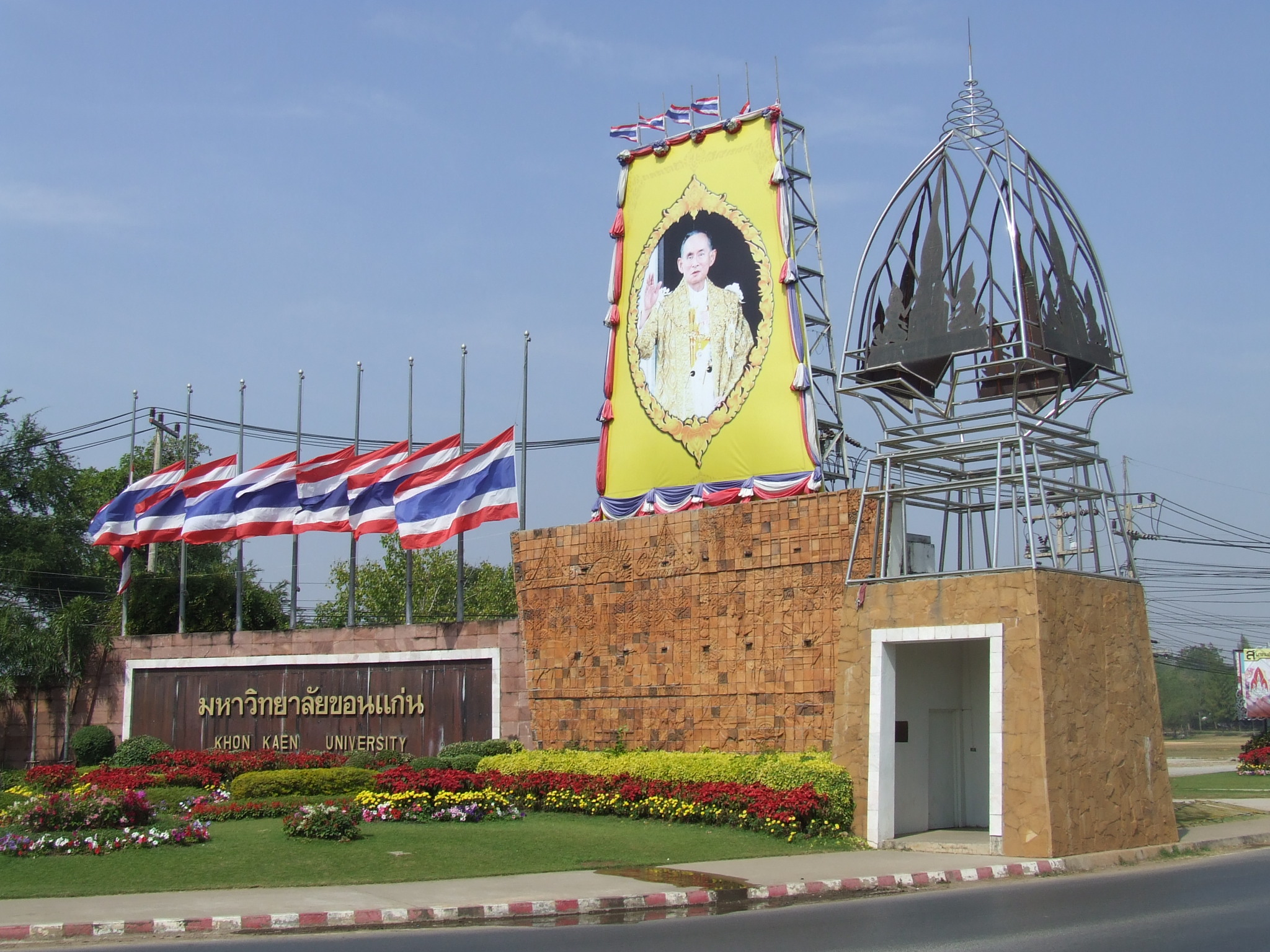
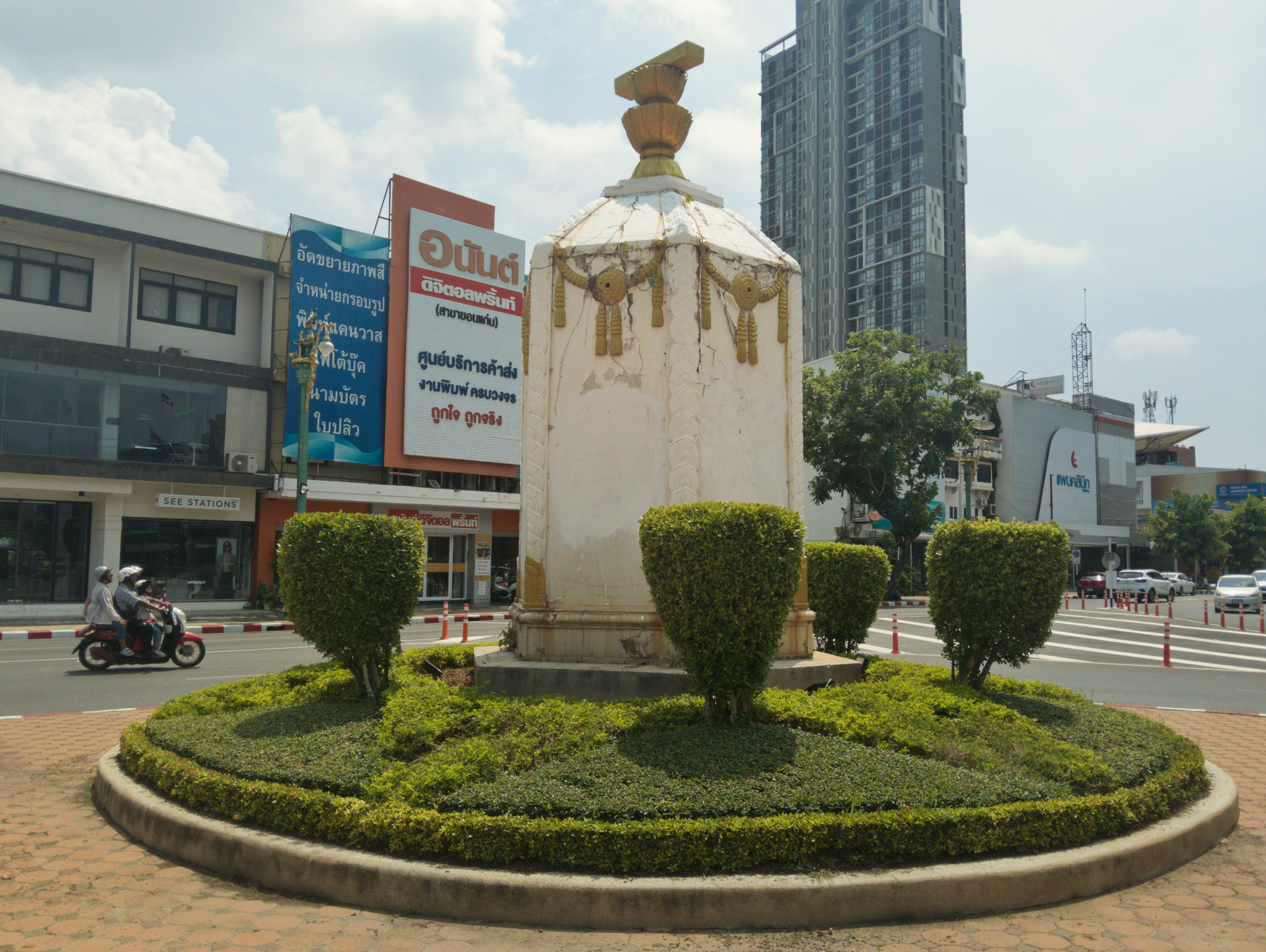
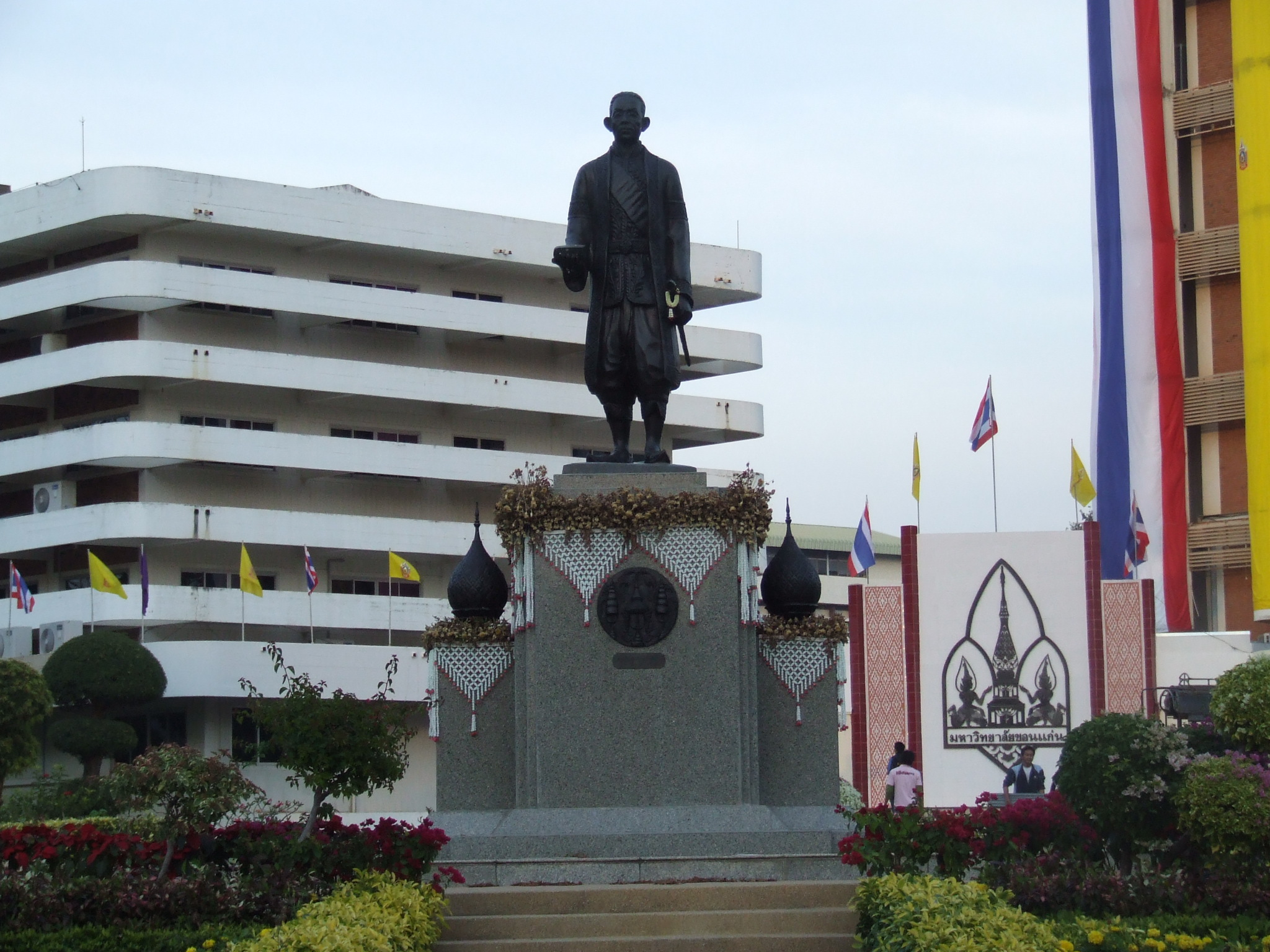
- From top, left to right: Aerial view of Khon Kaen City; Wat Klang Khon Kaen; Sithan Gate of Khon Kaen University, flags half-raised to honor Princess Galyani Vadhana; Khon Kaen democracy monument; statue of King Rama IV at Khon Kaen University.

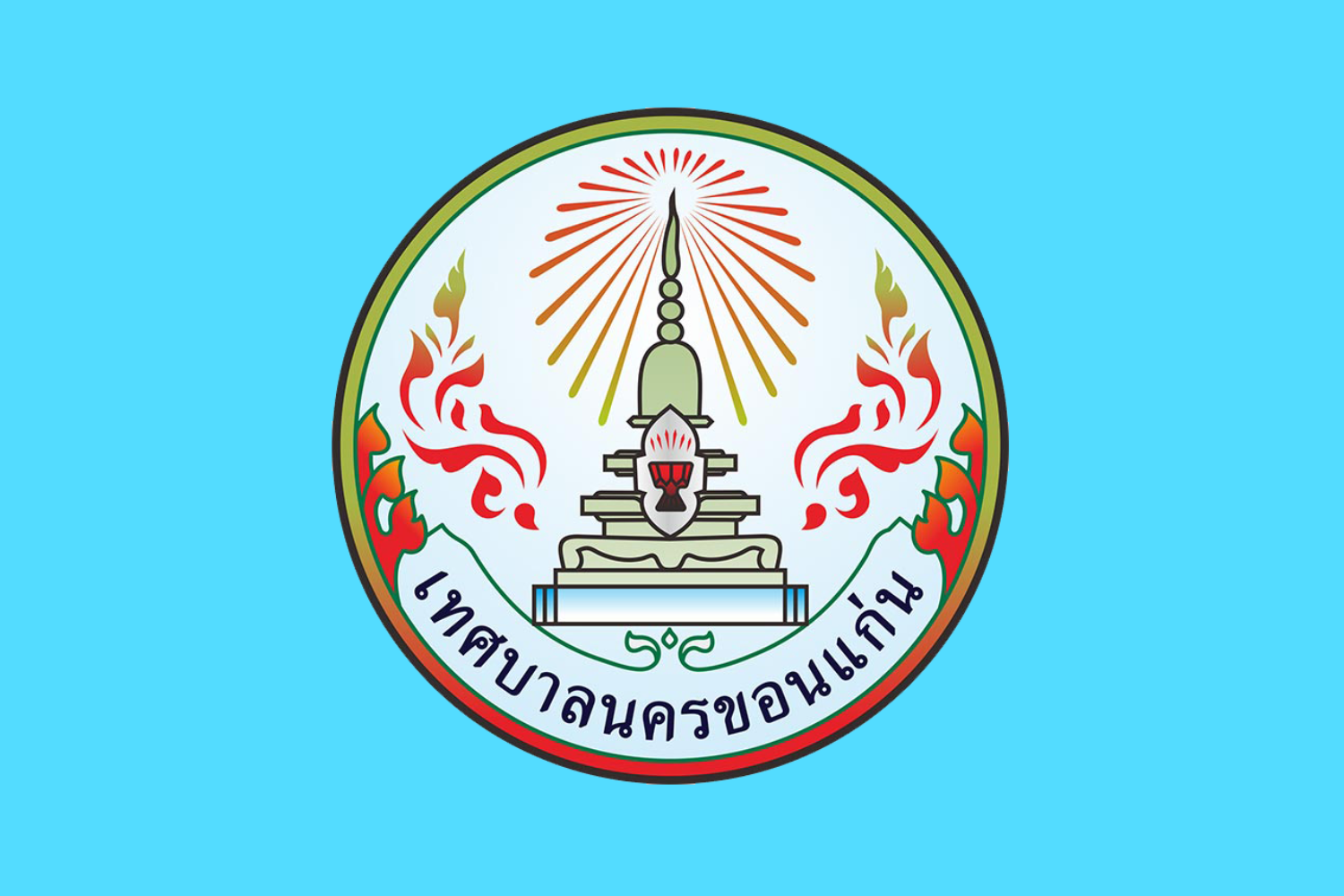
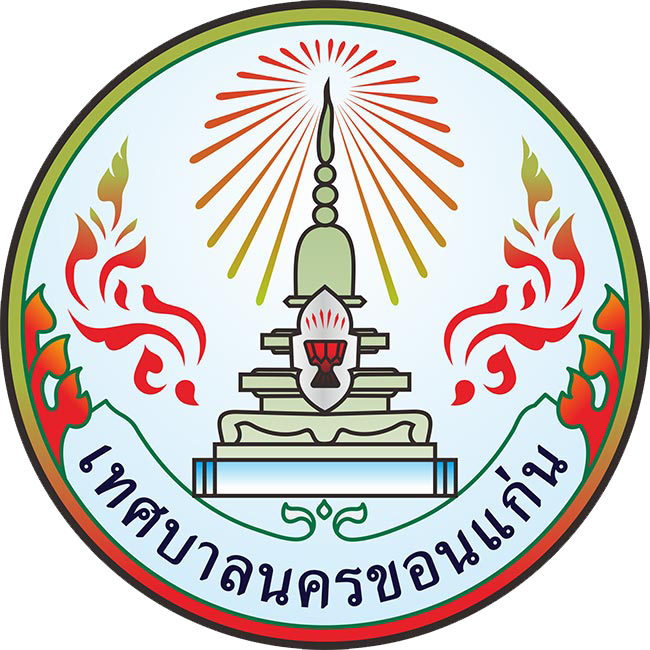
- Flag Seal

- Location in Thailand
- Coordinates: 16°26′N 102°50′E
- Country: Thailand
- Province: Khon Kaen
- District: Muang Khon Kaen
- Town municipality: 20 Aug 1935
- City municipality: 24 Sept 1995

Government
  - Type: City Municipality
  - Mayor: Prasit Thongtangthai

Area
  - City Municipality: 46 km^{2} (18 sq mi)
  - Urban: 953.4 km^{2} (368.1 sq mi)
  - Rank: 10th
- Elevation: 187 m (614 ft)

Population (2019)
  - City Municipality: 114,459
  - Density: 2,488/km^{2} (6,440/sq mi)
  - Urban (2024): 416,988
  - Urban density: 437.4/km^{2} (1,133/sq mi)
- Registered residents
- Time zone: UTC+7 (ICT)
- Postcode: 40000
- Calling Code: 043
- Website: www.kkmuni.go.th

Khon Kaen (Thai: ขอนแก่น, pronounced [kʰɔ̌(ː)n kɛ̀n]) is the capital of Khon Kaen province and the fourth-largest city in Thailand. It is one of the four major cities of Isan, Northeast Thailand, also known as the "big four of Isan", the others being Udon Thani, Nakhon Ratchasima, and Ubon Ratchathani.

The city municipality of Khon Kaen (thesaban nakhon) acts as the governmental seat of the province, as well as the Mueang Khon Kaen district and lies 450 kilometres (280 mi) northeast of Bangkok. Since the late 20th century, urban development has expanded beyond the municipal boundary into neighbouring local government areas, forming a continuous urban area.

== Geography and demography ==
Khon Kaen is on the Khorat Plateau, elevation 187 m, and is the center of the mid-northeastern provincial group of Thailand, according to the Thai government. Its coordinates are 16°26′N 102°50′E. The city municipality has a population of 114,459, while the Mueang Khon Kaen district, forming the city's urban area, has a population of 416,988. Khon Kaen therefore ranks as the fourth-largest city in Thailand after Bangkok, Chiang Mai and Korat.

=== Location ===
Khon Kaen is a city in the northeastern region of Thailand. The city is bisected by Mithraphap Road, also known as the "Friendship Highway", or "Highway 2", the road linking Bangkok to the Thai-Lao Friendship Bridge. Highway 230, a modern, multi-lane by-pass enables through-traffic to avoid the city center to the west, and connects to the airport, the new main bus station (BKS3).

=== Smart City ===
The province of Khon Kaen's 2017 population was 1.8 million with a GDP of 190 billion baht. Its Smart City development plan aims to double its GDP per person to 394,000-493,000 baht by 2029 from an average of about 192,000 baht in 2016. Khon Kaen's plan has been incorporated into Thailand's 12th national social and economic plan (2017–2021). The plan has been driven largely by the Khon Kaen Think Tank (KKTT), a group of involved citizens. The Smart City's signature project is the Khon Kaen Transit System Co (KKTS), founded in 2017. Its plans for a 26 km light rail network from Samran to Tha Phra in the Mueang Khon Kaen District are complete and awaiting Thai Cabinet approval before bidding on the project can begin. The light rail system will feature 18 to 21 stations, take two years to complete, and will cost 15 billion baht. The Land Traffic Management Commission (LTMC), a national think tank for transportation policy, has already blessed the plan.

== Culture ==
Thailand's 2014 EU Film Festival included Khon Kaen, together with Chiang Mai and Bangkok, as host locations. A selection of six films were shown in the city, including the Spanish film The Pelayos, and the Polish film Walesa, Man of Hope.

== Administration ==
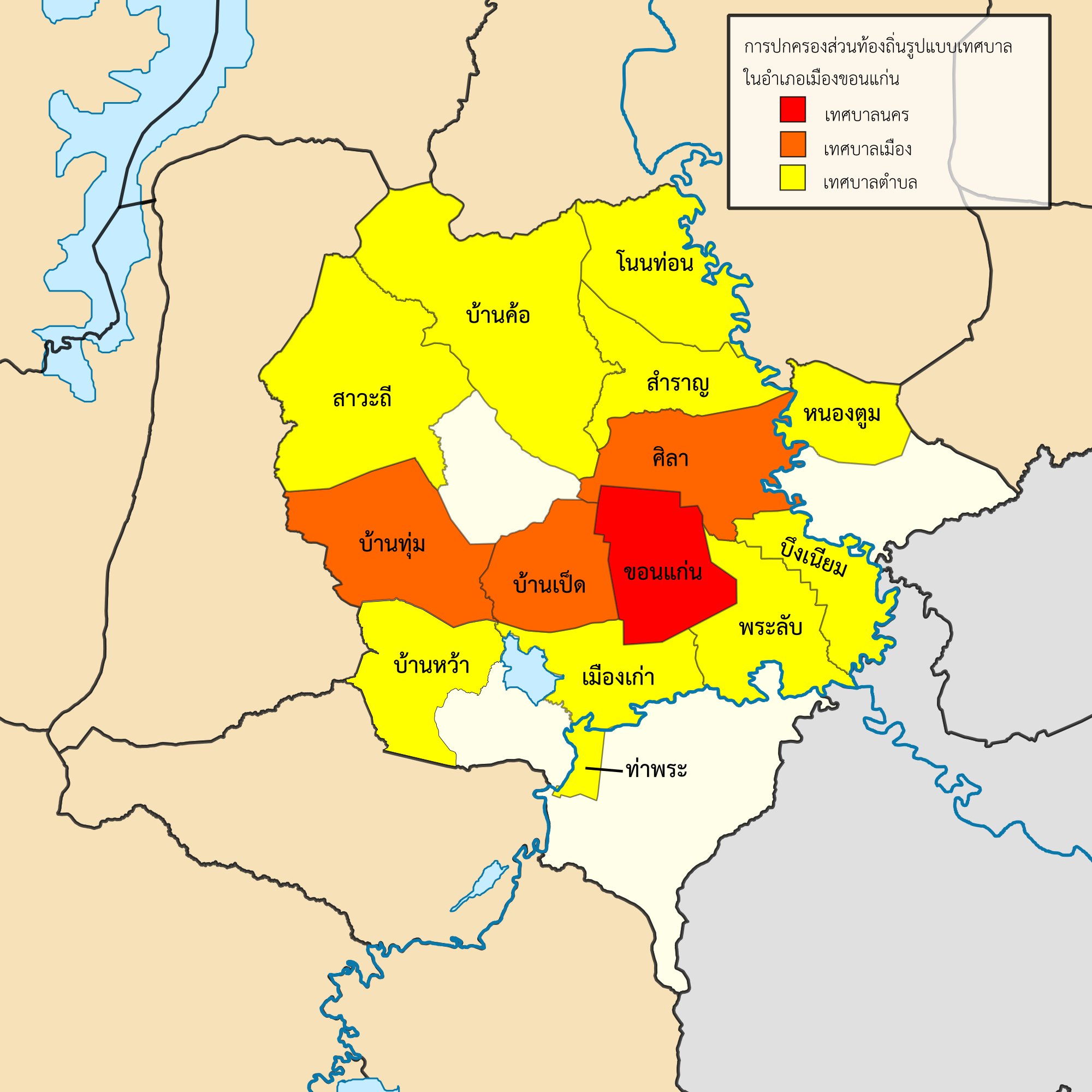
Municipalities in Mueang Khon Kaen district by municipality type, with Khon Kaen City Municipality highlighted in red.

The municipality of Khon Kaen was established on 20 August 1935, with an area of 4 square kilometers. It was later upgraded to a city municipality on 24 September 1995.

The municipality is coterminous with Nai Mueang Subdistrict in Mueang Khon Kaen district and administers an area of approximately 46 km^{2}. It is divided into 95 communities (chumchon), which are grouped into four administrative zones for the coordination of municipal services and community development.

Khon Kaen City Municipality is governed under the Municipalities Act by an elected mayor and the Khon Kaen City Municipal Council. The municipality is responsible for local public services, including urban planning, public works, environmental management, waste management, public health, primary education, parks, and local infrastructure within its jurisdiction.

== Urban development ==
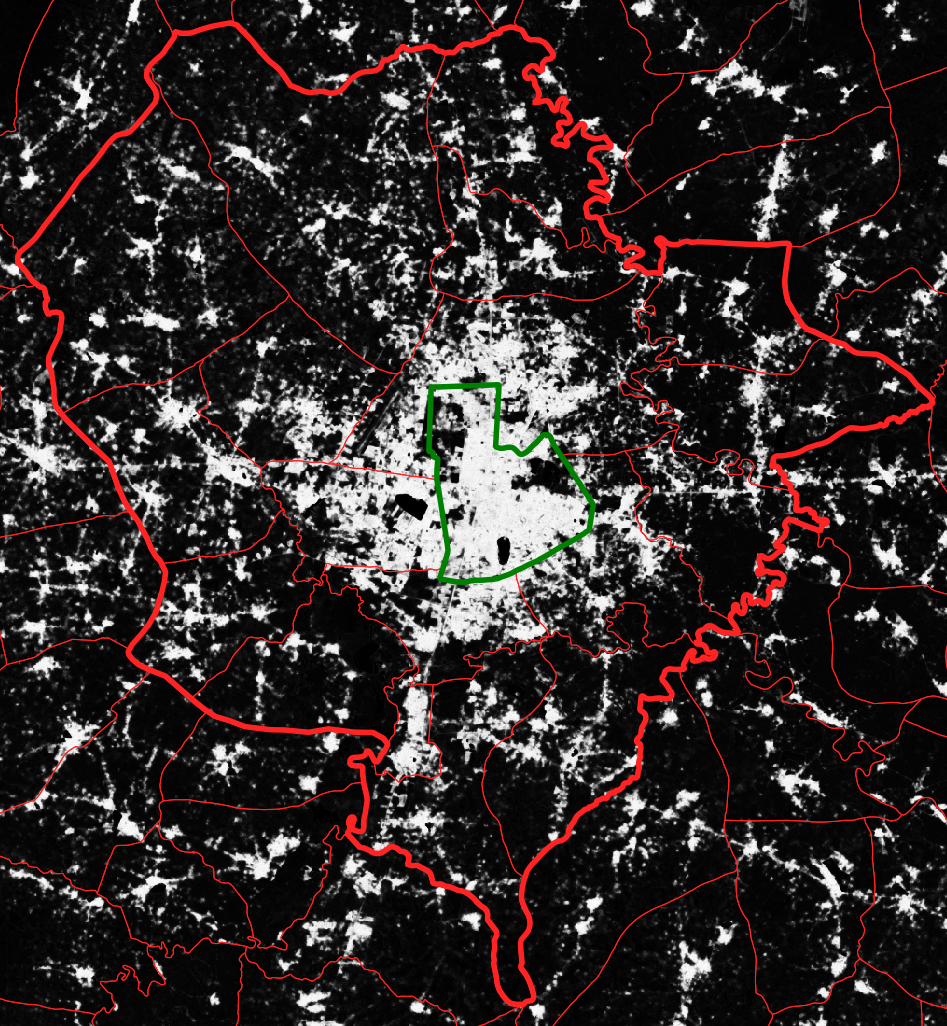
The contiguous built-up area of Khon Kaen extends well beyond the administrative boundary of Khon Kaen City Municipality (green), encompassing neighbouring local government areas within Mueang Khon Kaen district.

Since the late 20th century, Khon Kaen has experienced rapid urban expansion driven by population growth, regional economic development, the expansion of Khon Kaen University, and improvements to the highway network centred on Mittraphap Road. As a result, the city's built-up area has expanded beyond the administrative boundary of Khon Kaen City Municipality into adjacent municipalities and subdistrict administrative organizations within Mueang Khon Kaen district.

The contiguous urban area today extends across several municipalities surrounding the city centre, including Sila, Ban Pet, , Ban Thum, Mueang Kao, Phra Lap, and Tha Phra, while suburban development has also continued into adjacent subdistrict administrative organizations (SAOs: องค์การบริหารส่วนตำบล).

Remote sensing studies have identified a substantial increase in built-up land between 1990 and 2015, largely through the conversion of agricultural land. This pattern of outward urban expansion has been accompanied by increasing landscape fragmentation and linear development along major transport corridors, particularly Mittraphap Road.

== Climate ==
Khon Kaen's climate is categorized as tropical savanna (Köppen climate classification Aw), with winters that are dry and very warm. Temperatures rise until April, a very hot month, with an average daily maximum of 36.3 °C (97.3 °F). The monsoon season runs from May until October, with heavy rain and somewhat cooler temperatures during the day, although nights remain warm.

Climate data for Khon Kaen (1991–2020, extremes 1951-present)
Month	Jan	Feb	Mar	Apr	May	Jun	Jul	Aug	Sep	Oct	Nov	Dec	Year
Record high °C (°F)	37.3 (99.1)	41.0 (105.8)	41.8 (107.2)	43.1 (109.6)	42.8 (109.0)	39.6 (103.3)	40.0 (104.0)	37.7 (99.9)	36.5 (97.7)	36.5 (97.7)	37.5 (99.5)	37.5 (99.5)	43.1 (109.6)
Mean daily maximum °C (°F)	30.8 (87.4)	32.8 (91.0)	35.2 (95.4)	36.2 (97.2)	34.9 (94.8)	34.0 (93.2)	33.0 (91.4)	32.4 (90.3)	32.0 (89.6)	31.8 (89.2)	31.6 (88.9)	30.3 (86.5)	32.9 (91.2)
Daily mean °C (°F)	23.8 (74.8)	25.9 (78.6)	28.6 (83.5)	29.9 (85.8)	29.1 (84.4)	28.8 (83.8)	28.2 (82.8)	27.6 (81.7)	27.3 (81.1)	26.8 (80.2)	25.5 (77.9)	23.7 (74.7)	27.1 (80.8)
Mean daily minimum °C (°F)	18.1 (64.6)	20.0 (68.0)	23.0 (73.4)	24.8 (76.6)	25.1 (77.2)	25.1 (77.2)	24.6 (76.3)	24.3 (75.7)	24.1 (75.4)	22.9 (73.2)	20.7 (69.3)	18.2 (64.8)	22.6 (72.6)
Record low °C (°F)	5.7 (42.3)	10.3 (50.5)	11.1 (52.0)	17.2 (63.0)	17.4 (63.3)	21.1 (70.0)	21.0 (69.8)	21.1 (70.0)	20.3 (68.5)	14.6 (58.3)	9.4 (48.9)	5.6 (42.1)	5.6 (42.1)
Average precipitation mm (inches)	6.0 (0.24)	17.3 (0.68)	38.0 (1.50)	94.6 (3.72)	155.0 (6.10)	145.7 (5.74)	177.9 (7.00)	222.2 (8.75)	246.0 (9.69)	102.1 (4.02)	21.5 (0.85)	5.1 (0.20)	1,231.4 (48.48)
Average precipitation days (≥ 1.0 mm)	0.8	1.6	3.3	5.9	11.2	10.4	12.4	14.4	15.1	6.8	1.6	0.5	84.0
Average relative humidity (%)	64.4	61.9	61.2	64.8	74.0	75.8	78.2	81.1	83.3	76.9	69.3	64.5	71.3
Mean monthly sunshine hours	237.4	237.3	244.1	223.5	189.6	154.3	136.5	128.0	144.9	209.0	221.8	221.7	2,348.1
Mean daily sunshine hours	8.9	8.6	8.9	6.8	6.4	5.2	3.9	3.8	4.8	6.4	7.3	8.3	6.6
Source 1: World Meteorological Organization
Source 2: Office of Water Management and Hydrology, Royal Irrigation Department (daily sun 1981–2010) (extremes)

== Notable people ==
- Thaiboy Digital - musician
- Kaoklai Kaennorsing - Muay Thai fighter
- Tee Ritson - rugby league player
- Nadech Kugimiya - actor
- Tin Sritrai - racing driver
- Mimi Tao, fashion model
