= Chatchon Jairangsee =

Thai footballer (born 1995)

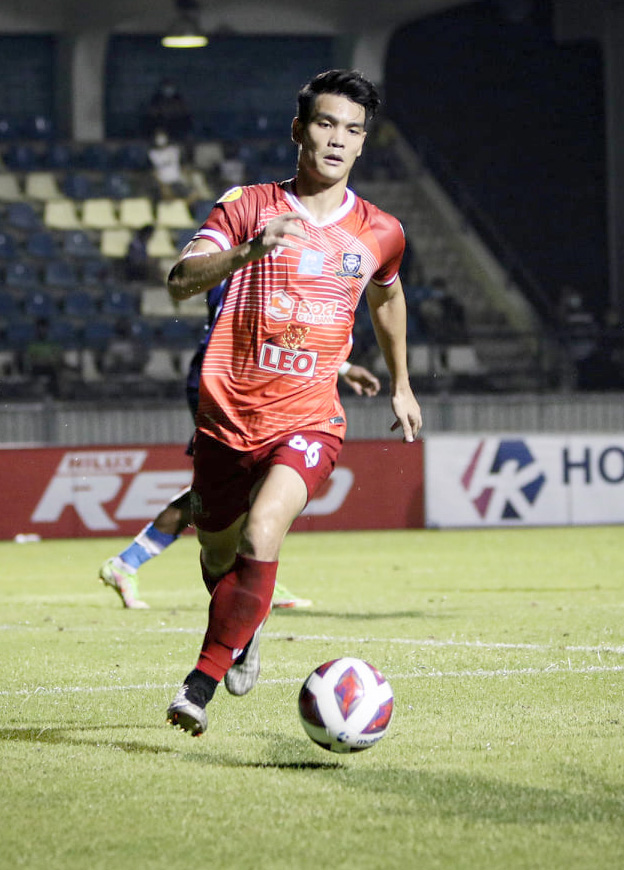

Personal information
- Full name: Chatchon Jairangsee
- Date of birth: 19 May 1995 (age 31)
- Place of birth: Chiang Mai, Thailand
- Height: 1.78 m (5 ft 10 in)
- Position: Centre-back

Team information
- Current team: Chiangmai United
- Number: 66

Youth career
- 2010–2012: Suankularb Wittayalai School
- 2013: Buriram United

Senior career*
Years	Team	Apps	(Gls)
2014–2016	Buriram United	0	(0)
2014	→ Surin City (loan)		
2015	→ Phichit (loan)		
2016	→ Nonthaburi (loan)		
2017	Bangkok Christian College		
2018–2019	Chainat Hornbill	15	(0)
2020	Samut Sakhon		
2020–2021	Rayong	19	(1)
2021–2022	MOF Customs United	27	(1)
2022–2023	Pattani	20	(2)
2023–2024	Lampang	24	(1)
2024–2025	Chanthaburi	10	(0)
2026–	Chiangmai United	0	(0)
- * Club domestic league appearances and goals as of 18:28, 12 October 2025 (UTC)

Chatchon Jairangsee (Thai: ชัชชน ใจรังสี, born on 19 May 1995) is a Thai professional footballer who plays as a centre-back for Thai League 2 club Chiangmai United.
