= Brenner (footballer, born 1999) =

Brazilian footballer

Personal information
- Full name: Brenner Alves Sabino
- Date of birth: 10 February 1999 (age 27)
- Place of birth: Porto Alegre, Brazil
- Height: 1.83 m (6 ft 0 in)
- Position: Forward

Youth career
- Internacional

Senior career*
Years	Team	Apps	(Gls)
2018–2020	Internacional	9	(0)
2019	→ Oeste (loan)	1	(0)
2019	→ Vejle BK (loan)	3	(0)
2020	→ Iwate Grulla Morioka (loan)	28	(4)
2021–2022	Iwate Grulla Morioka	56	(9)
2023	PT Prachuap	6	(1)
2023–2025	Khon Kaen United	43	(11)
- * Club domestic league appearances and goals as of 13:26, 26 July 2025 (UTC)

Brenner Alves Sabino (born 10 February 1999), commonly known as Brenner, is a Brazilian professional footballer who plays as a forward.

== Career ==
=== Internacional ===
Brenner made his debut for Internacional against Esporte Clube Cruzeiro on 7 March 2018.

=== Oeste ===
Brenner made his debut for Oeste against São Bento on 25 May 2019.

=== Vejle ===
On 13 August 2019 Danish 1st Division club Vejle Boldklub announced, that they had signed Brenner on a one-year loan deal with an option to buy. He made his debut for Vejle against Kolding IF on 21 August 2019. However, the club announced on 20 December 2019, that the deal had been terminated after having played only three games for the club.

=== Loan to Grulla Morioka ===
During his loan spell, Brenner made his debut for Grulla Morioka against Blaublitz Akita on 27 June 2020. He scored his first goal for the club against Kataller Toyama on 18 October 2020, scoring a penalty in the 61st minute

=== Grulla Morioka ===
Brenner made his debut for Grulla Morioka against Tegevajaro Miyazaki on 14 March 2021. He scored his first goal for the club against Kagoshima United on 2 May 2021, scoring in the 14th minute.

=== Prachuap ===
Brenner made his debut for Prachuap against Khon Kaen United on 2 April 2023. He scored his first goal for the club against Bangkok United on 30 April 2023, scoring in the 89th minute.

=== Khon Kaen ===
Brenner made his debut for Khon Kaen against Buriram United on 12 August 2023. He scored his first goal for the club against Prachuap on 24 September 2023, scoring in the 79th minute.

== Career statistics ==
As of 1 January 2022

Appearances and goals by club, season and competition
Club	Season	League			Cup		Total	
Club	Season	Division	Apps	Goals	Apps	Goals	Apps	Goals
Iwate Grulla Morioka	2020	J3 League	28	4	–		28	4
Iwate Grulla Morioka	2021	J3 League	24	5	3	2	27	7
Career total			52	9	3	2	55	11
