= Ban Haet district =

Ban Haet บ้านแฮด
- District
- District location in Khon Kaen province
- Coordinates: 16°12′9″N 102°45′3″E
- Country: Thailand
- Province: Khon Kaen
- Seat: Ban Haet

Area
  - Total: 205.2 km^{2} (79.2 sq mi)

Population (2005)
  - Total: 32,135
  - Density: 156.6/km^{2} (406/sq mi)
- Time zone: UTC+7 (ICT)
- Postal code: 40110
- Geocode: 4024

Ban Haet (Thai: บ้านแฮด, pronounced [bâːn hɛ̂(ː)t]; Northeastern Thai: บ้านแฮด, pronounced [bâːn hɛ̂(ː)t]) is a district (amphoe) of Khon Kaen province, northeastern Thailand.

== History ==
The minor district (king amphoe) was established on 1 April 1995 with area split off from Ban Phai district.

On 15 May 2007, all 81 minor districts in Thailand were upgraded to full districts. With publication in the Royal Gazette on 24 August the upgrade became official.

== Geography ==
Neighboring districts are (from the south clockwise) Ban Phai, Mancha Khiri, Phra Yuen, Mueang Khon Kaen of Khon Kaen Province, and Kosum Phisai of Maha Sarakham province.

== Administration ==
The district is divided into four sub-districts (tambons), which are further subdivided into 45 villages (mubans). The township (thesaban tambon) Ban Haet covers parts of tambon Ban Haet. There are a further four tambon administrative organizations (TAO).

No.	Name	Thai name	Villages	Pop.
1.	Ban Haet	บ้านแฮด	11	8,888
2.	Khok Samran	โคกสำราญ	16	9,014
3.	Non Sombun	โนนสมบูรณ์	11	9,260
4.	Nong Saeng	หนองแซง	7	4,973
