= Mimi Tao =

Thai fashion model

- มีมี่ เทา
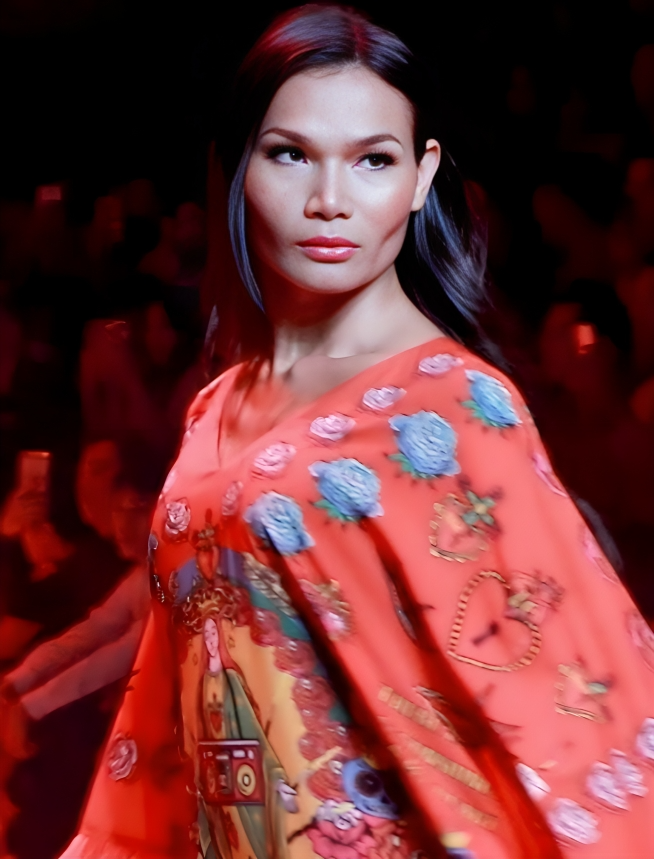
- Tao at the Bangkok International fashion Week 2019
- Born: Phajaranat Nobantao; March 19, 1993 (age 33); Khon Kaen, Thailand
- Occupation: Fashion model
- Television: Project Runway
- Modeling information
- Height: 5 ft 10 in (2 m)
- Hair color: Dark Brown
- Eye color: Brown
- Agency: Super Red Modeling
- Website: Mimi Tao

Mimi Tao (Thai: มีมี่ เทา, RTGS: Mimi Thao; born 19 March 1993) is a Thai fashion model. She is best known for being the first transgender model to appear on the reality television series, Project Runway.

== Early life ==
Tao was born and raised in Khon Kaen, Thailand. She is the middle child of three, with an older sister and a younger brother, all born one year apart. At eleven she became a monk, but left the monastery after six years to help her family, who had been bankrupted by a financial crisis. She left for Pattaya and there she was offered a job as a cabaret dancer. After working for three months she left Pattaya to search for a better paying job in Bangkok. Tao successfully applied to work for the renowned Calypso Cabaret show and held that position for another couple of months. A TV documentary about the Thai supermodel Rojjana “Yui” Phetkanha which she came across while working there, sparked her interest in modelling. She was a fan and after some persuasion, convinced Phetkanha to help her learn modeling. Yui taught Tao everything she knew: catwalk techniques, posing skills, how to get in the best light at a photo shoot, and how to book jobs. Tao spent three months studying under Yui until she was ready to enter the modeling industry on her own.

Phetkanha’s story was what touched me and made me want to become a model. She came from a poor family and, like me, had tanned skin, high cheekbones and a squarish face—all of which weren’t features that Thai people would traditionally consider beautiful—yet she was still able to make it and become so famous. That’s when I decided I wanted to be like her, and I set out looking for her, hoping that she would teach me to model.

— Tao for Tatler Asia.

== Career ==
Tao moved to the United States in 2017 to pursue a modeling career after failed attempts in Thailand and Singapore. In 2018, Tao appeared in 24 shows at New York Fashion Week.

In 2021 Tao became a regular model on season 19 of Project Runway. She was the show's first transgender model. She also was a regular model in 2023's season 20.

In 2019, Tao was represented by the Los Angeles modeling agency Slay, which represents only transgender models. As of 2024, Tao is represented by Super Red Modeling.

== Personal life ==
Tao is a Buddhist. She is transgender.
