= Sirichai Phumpat =

Thai footballer

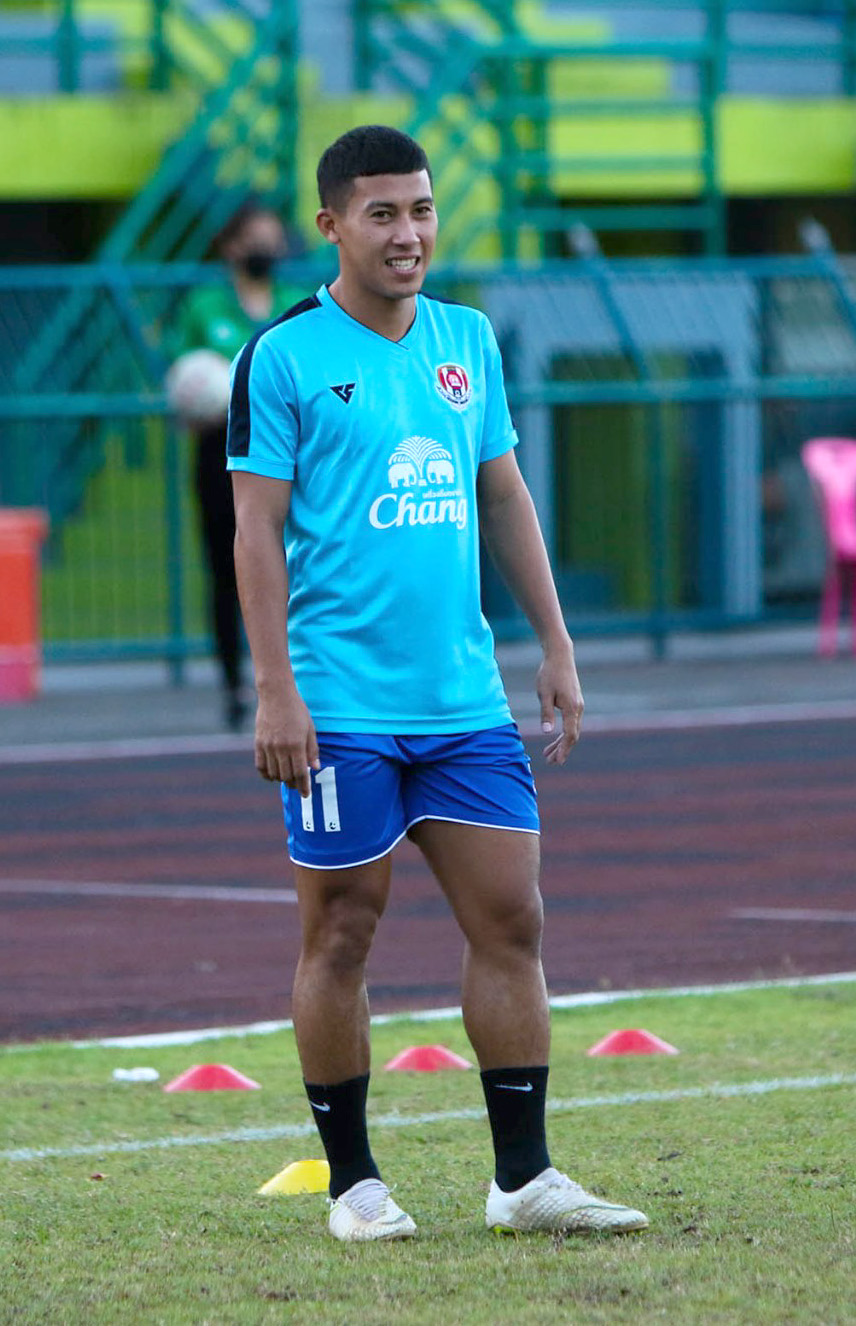

Personal information
- Full name: Sirichai Phumpat
- Date of birth: 3 August 1994 (age 32)
- Place of birth: Thailand
- Position: Forward

Senior career*
Years	Team	Apps	(Gls)
2016	Navy	2	(0)
2016–2018	Trat		
2018–2024	Navy	105	(17)
- * Club domestic league appearances and goals as of 18 March 2023

Sirichai Phumpat (Thai: ศิริชัย ภูมิพัฒน์) is a Thai professional footballer who is currently playing as a forward.
