= Phra Yuen district =

Phra Yuen พระยืน
- District
- District location in Khon Kaen province
- Coordinates: 16°19′26″N 102°38′55″E
- Country: Thailand
- Province: Khon Kaen

Area
  - Total: 172.0 km^{2} (66.4 sq mi)

Population (2005)
  - Total: 34,064
  - Density: 198/km^{2} (510/sq mi)
- Time zone: UTC+7 (ICT)
- Postal code: 40320
- Geocode: 4003

Phra Yuen (Thai: พระยืน, pronounced [pʰráʔ jɯ̄ːn], Northeastern Thai: พระยืน, pronounced [pʰàʔ jɯ̄ːn]) is a district (amphoe) of Khon Kaen province, northeastern Thailand.

== History ==
The minor district (king amphoe) Phra Yuen was established on 18 October 1976 by splitting off the three tambons: Phra Yuen, Phra Bu, and Ban Ton from Mueang Khon Kaen district. On 1 January 1988 it was upgraded to a full district.

== Geography ==
Neighboring districts are (from the north clockwise): Ban Fang, Mueang Khon Kaen, Ban Haet and Mancha Khiri.

== Administration ==
The district is divided into five subdistricts (tambons), which are further subdivided into 46 villages (mubans). There are two townships (thesaban tambons): Ban Ton covers tambon Ban Ton, and Phra Yuen covers parts of tambon Phra Yuen. There are a further four tambon administrative organizations (TAO).

No.	Name	Thai name	Villages	Pop.
1.	Phra Yuen	พระยืน	15	12,500
2.	Phra Bu	พระบุ	8	4,378
3.	Ban Ton	บ้านโต้น	6	6,540
4.	Nong Waeng	หนองแวง	8	4,917
5.	Kham Pom	ขามป้อม	9	5,729
