= Ban Phai district =

Ban Phai บ้านไผ่
- District
- District location in Khon Kaen province
- Coordinates: 16°3′36″N 102°43′51″E
- Country: Thailand
- Province: Khon Kaen

Area
  - Total: 477.7 km^{2} (184.4 sq mi)

Population (2007)
  - Total: 101,031
  - Density: 211.5/km^{2} (548/sq mi)
- Time zone: UTC+7 (ICT)
- Postal code: 40110
- Geocode: 4010

Ban Phai (Thai: บ้านไผ่, pronounced [bâːn pʰàj]; Northeastern Thai: บ้านไผ่, pronounced [bâːn pʰāj]) is a district (amphoe) of Khon Kaen province, northeastern Thailand.

== Geography ==
Neighboring districts are (from the south clockwise): Pueai Noi, Nong Song Hong, Non Sila, Chonnabot, Mancha Khiri, and Ban Haet of Khon Kaen Province; Kosum Phisai and Kut Rang of Maha Sarakham province.

== History ==
Originally named Ban Keng (บ้านเกิ้ง), the area was at first a subdistrict (tambon) of Chonnabot district. In 1928 the minor district (king amphoe) Ban Phai was established consisting of three subdistricts split off from Chonnabot. It was upgraded to a full district on 1 February 1940. In 1946 Chonnabot was downgraded to be a part of Ban Phai District, until it was reestablished in 1966.

== Economy ==
As of 2019, Thai sugar giant, the Mitr Phol Group, plans to construct a sugarcane mill and biomass power plant in the district. The initiative will occupy 4,000 rai (640 ha; 1,600 acres) of three of the province's neighbouring districts: Ban Phai, Chonnabot, and Non Sila. The operation will form part of the Ban Phai Bio-Hub Industrial Estate and is linked to the Eastern Economic Corridor (EEC) project. Mitr Phol's plans have been met with some opposition from local residents. Mitr Phol has pledged that the factory will have no adverse environmental effects.

== Administration ==
The district is divided into 10 subdistricts (tambons), which are further subdivided into 113 villages (mubans). Ban Phai is a town (thesaban mueang) which covers parts of tambons Ban Phai, Khaen Nuea, and Nai Mueang. There are a further 10 tambon administrative organizations (TAO).

No.	Name	Thai name	Villages	Pop.
1.	Ban Phai	บ้านไผ่	13	17,858
2.	Nai Mueang	ในเมือง	9	26,566
5.	Mueang Phia	เมืองเพีย	13	9,634
9.	Ban Lan	บ้านลาน	15	8,768
10.	Khaen Nuea	แคนเหนือ	9	6,973
11.	Phu Lek	ภูเหล็ก	8	5,966
13.	Pa Po	ป่าปอ	9	7,505
14.	Hin Tang	หินตั้ง	11	7,864
16.	Nong Nam Sai	หนองน้ำใส	11	6,246
17.	Hua Nong	หัวหนอง	6	3,651

Missing numbers are subdistricts which now form Ban Haet and Non Sila Districts.
