= Mueang Khon Kaen district =

Mueang Khon Kaen เมืองขอนแก่น
- District
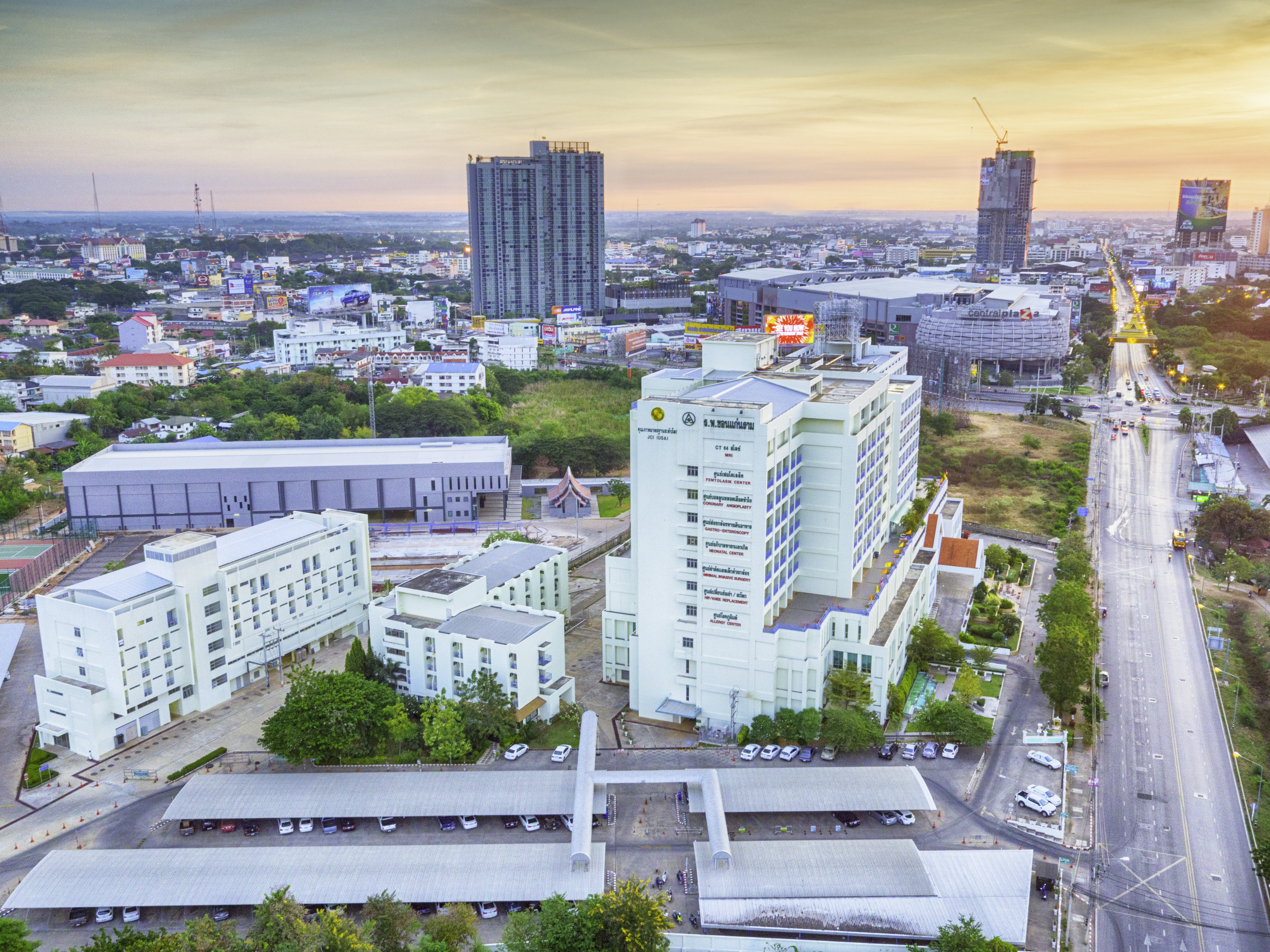
- Aerial view of the district
- Mottoes: รักษาประเพณี พัฒนาท้องที่ สร้างสามัคคีในสังคม นิยมประหยัด; Protect culture, Upgrade local, build Unity in Society, admire conserve.
- District location in Khon Kaen province
- Coordinates: 16°26′18″N 102°50′20″E
- Country: Thailand
- Province: Khon Kaen
- Seat: Nai Mueang

Area
  - Total: 953.4 km^{2} (368.1 sq mi)

Population (2022)
  - Total: 412,758
  - Density: 432.93/km^{2} (1,121.3/sq mi)
- Time zone: UTC+7 (ICT)
- Postal code: 40000
- Geocode: 4001

Mueang Khon Kaen (Thai: เมืองขอนแก่น, pronounced [mɯ̄aŋ kʰɔ̌ːn kɛ̀n]; Northeastern Thai: เมืองขอนแก่น, pronounced [mɯ̂aŋ kʰɔ̌ːn kɛ́n]) is the capital district (amphoe mueang) of Khon Kaen province, northeastern Thailand.

== Geography ==
Neighboring districts are (from the south clockwise) Ban Haet, Phra Yuen, Ban Fang, Ubolratana, Nam Phong, and Sam Sung of Khon Kaen Province; Kosum Phisai and Chiang Yuen of Maha Sarakham province.

== History ==
On 29 April 1917, the district name was changed from Mueang to Phra Lap (พระลับ). On 14 November 1937 it was renamed Mueang Khon Kaen.

== Administration ==
The district is divided into 17 sub-districts (tambons), which are further subdivided into 272 villages (mubans). The city (thesaban nakhon) Khon Kaen covers the whole tambon Nai Mueang. Tha Phra is a sub-district municipality (thesaban tambon) covering parts of tambon Tha Phra. There are a further 16 tambon administrative organizations (TAO).

No.	Name	Thai	Villages	Pop. (2008)
1.	Nai Muang	ในเมือง	-	118,203
2.	Samran	สำราญ	13	9,637
3.	Khok Si	โคกสี	14	8,788
4.	Tha Phra	ท่าพระ	20	19,197
5.	Ban Thum	บ้านทุ่ม	17	17,088
6.	Mueang Kao	เมืองเก่า	17	24,840
7.	Phra Lap	พระลับ	19	20,803
8.	Sawathi	สาวะถี	23	17,751
9.	Ban Wa	บ้านหว้า	13	10,632
10.	Ban Kho	บ้านค้อ	19	15,352
11.	Daeng Yai	แดงใหญ่	10	7,190
12.	Don Chang	ดอนช้าง	8	4,745
13.	Don Han	ดอนหัน	15	9,812
14.	Sila	ศิลา	28	44,194
15.	Ban Pet	บ้านเป็ด	23	29,801
16.	Nong Tum	หนองตูม	11	7,375
17.	Bueng Niam	บึงเนียม	12	7,291
18.	Non Thon	โนนท่อน	10	9,457
