= Sylvie von Duuglas-Ittu =

American Muay Thai fighter

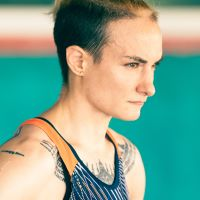
- Born: 3 November 1983 (age 42); Boulder, Colorado, U.S.
- Other names: Sylvie Petchruangruang; Sylvie Kemical X
- Height: 1.57 m (5 ft 2 in)
- Weight: 45 kg (99 lb; 7.1 st)
- Style: Muay Khao
- Stance: Orthodox
- Fighting out of: Pattaya, Thailand
- Team: Petchrungruang Gym (former)
- Years active: 2009-present

Kickboxing record
- Total: 286
- Wins: 194
- By knockout: 97
- Losses: 79
- By knockout: 6
- Draws: 13
- No contests: 0

Other information
- Occupation: Freelance journalist
- Notable school: Sarah Lawrence College
- Website: https://www.8limbsus.com/

YouTube information
- Channel: Sylvie von Duuglas-Ittu - Muay Thai
- Years active: 2009-present
- Genres: vlog; documentary
- Subscribers: 87.3 thousand
- Views: 18.6 million
- Last updated: 21 October 2024

Sylvie Von Duuglas-Ittu (born 3 November 1983) is an American professional Muay Thai fighter. Living and competing in Thailand, where she holds the most recorded number of fights by a foreigner in the country, Duuglas-Ittu is a two-times International Professional Combat Council (IPCC) World Champion and the 2023 WBC Minimumweight Muay Thai World Champion. As of June 16, 2023, she is ranked No. 1 and No. 10 respectively in the World Muay thai Organization (WMO) Mini flyweight and the IFMA Pinweight Muay Thai rankings.

== Biography ==
Von Duuglas-Ittu was born on 3 November 1983. Duuglas-Ittu discovered Muay Thai in Boulder, Colorado, before started training under veteran fighter Kumron Vaitayanon (Master K) in New Jersey. On 27 June 2009 she had her first amateur fight in Richmond, Virginia. After receiving a Liberal Arts degree from Sarah Lawrence College, she moved permanently to Thailand in 2012 to train and fight.

In May 2019 and in 2020, on two separate occasions, she won the International Professional Combat Council (IPCC) World 108 lbs title. In March 2021 she was ranked No. 2 in Mini flyweight by the WBC MuayThai. In November 2022 Duuglas-Ittu held the most recorded number of fights by a foreigner in Thailand with 270 fights. In December 2022 she was ranked No. 2 in Minimumweight by the WBC MuayThai.

On 4 February 2023, in Hua Hin, Thailand, she became WBC Muay Thai Minimumweight World Champion after defeating Elisabetta Solinas of Italy. In June 2023, Von Duuglas-Ittu was ranked No. 1 at Mini flyweight by the World Muaythai Organization (WMO), and No. 10 at Pinweight by the International Federation of Muaythai Associations (IFMA).

Duuglas-Ittu is a freelance journalist and runs a popular Muay Thai blog called 8limbsus.com. She also runs a vlog and documentary YouTube channel where she documents her fighting career as well as the careers old Muay Thai legends.

In August 2026, Sylvie von Duuglas-Ittu is ranked No. 2 in the WBC MuayThai World Division’s minimumweight rankings, behind Islay Erika Bomogao.

== Titles and accomplishments ==
Muay Thai

- 2014 Queen's Cup -46 kilograms (101 lb) Champion
- 2014 Chonburi Buffalo Race Festival (Chua Kraow Stadium) -47 kilograms (104 lb) Champion
- 2014 Sriracha -50 kilograms (110 lb) Champion
- 2014 Thepprasit Stadium -47 kilograms (104 lb) Champion
- 2015 Chonburi Buffalo Race Festival (Chua Kraow Stadium) -48 kilograms (106 lb) Champion
- 2015 Sattahip Loi Krathong Festival -52 kilograms (115 lb) Champion
- 2016 Muay Siam -105 pounds (48 kg) Northern Thailand Champion
- 2017 Thepprasit Stadium -45 kilograms (99 lb) Champion
- 2019 IPCC World -49 kilograms (108 lb) Champion
- 2020 IPCC World -51 kilograms (112 lb) Champion
- 2022 Western Region (Thailand) -47.5 kilograms (105 lb) Champion
- 2023 WBC Minimumweight Muay Thai World Champion
- 2026 Hua Hin Fight Night World -54 kilograms Champion
- 2026 Hua Hin Fight Night World -51 kilograms Champion
- 2026 Hua Hin Fight Night World -57 kilograms Champion

Awards

- Awakening Magazine Female Muay Thai Fighter of the Year (2015/2017)
- Awakening Magazine Journalist of the Year (2014)

== Fight record ==
Professional Muay Thai record
194 Wins (97 (T)KO's), 79 Losses, 12 Draws
Date	Result	Opponent	Event	Location	Method	Round	Time
2026-10-02	Loss	(Thailand) Yelli Kru Wut Muay Thai	Suranaree Stadium	Nakhon Ratchasima, Thailand	Decision		
2026-09-19	Win	(Thailand) Namphet Pumpantung	Hua Hin Fight Night	Hua Hin, Thailand	Decision	5	
Wins the Huahin Fight Night 57 kg World title.
2026-09-05	Win	(Thailand) Tidapet Petyothin	Huahin Muay Thai Soi 102	Hua Hin, Thailand	Decision	5	
Wins the Huahin Fight Night 51 kg World title.
2026-07-25	Loss	(Thailand) Namphet Pumpantung	Hua Hin Fight Night	Hua Hin, Thailand	Decision	5	
2026-06-06	Win	(Thailand) Linping Pumpanitung	Huahin Muay Thai Soi 102	Hua Hin, Thailand	Decision	5	
Wins the Huahin Fight Night 54 kg World title.
2026-05-09	Win	(Thailand) Mod Dam Lukmuangpet	Wang Sai Stadium	Nakhon Ratchasima Province, Thailand	Decision	5	2:00
2026-04-12	Win	(Thailand) Sudsuay Cafefahsai	Suek Muay Man	Buriram, Thailand	Decision	5	2:00
2026-03-21	Win	(Thailand) Lomfon Sor. Silarak	Silk Fight Night 4	Pattaya, Thailand	Decision	5	2:00
2025-12-13	Win	(Thailand) Lomfon Sor. Silarak	Silk Fight Night 1	Pattaya, Thailand	Decision	5	2:00
2025-05-24	Win	(Thailand) Rungsawapa Sit Sudyod		Khaen Dong, Buriram, Thailand	TKO	2	
2025-04-13	Win	(Thailand) Namgulap Or. Siritham		Khaen Dong, Buriram, Thailand	Decision	5	
2024-12-27	Loss	(Thailand) Prajahnchai Wor. Petchonjan		Sisaket, Thailand	Decision	5	
2024-08-24	Win	(Thailand) Nongbiew Sor.Jor.Tongkam		Buriram, Thailand	TKO	2	
2024-07-19	Draw	(Thailand) Pornnapa Por.Tochaichowin	Muay Kard Chuek	Kamphaeng Phet, Thailand	Decision	5	3:00
2024-05-18	Win	(Thailand) Phetnamwan Chor.Chokchai		Buriram, Thailand	TKO	3	
2024-03-10	Loss	(Thailand) Petchompu RungpichaiMuayThai		Phuket, Thailand	Decision	5	3:00
2024-02-15	Win	(Thailand) Phetnamwan Chor.Chokchai		Buriram, Thailand	Decision	5	3:00
2023-12-29	Win	(Thailand) Phetmorakot Mor.Rajabatmubanjombeung		Buriram, Thailand	Decision	5	3:00
2023-09-16	Loss	(Thailand) Neena Liamtanawat		Hua Hin, Thailand	Decision	5	3:00
2023-07-22	Draw	(Thailand) Petchjanchai R.R. Baankuiyae	Kard Chuek	Samut Sakhon, Thailand	Time limit	5	2:00
2023-03-30	Loss	(Thailand) Karaket Por.Muangphet		Khorat, Thailand	Decision	5	3:00
2023-02-04	Win	(Italy) Elisabetta Solinas	Amazing Muay Thai Festival	Hua Hin, Thailand	Decision	5	3:00
Wins the inaugural WBC Muaythai World Minimumweight Title.
2022-12-23	Draw	(Thailand) Plaifah Boonmarkpraewa	Siam Kard Chuek Pharanakhon	Bangkok, Thailand	Time limit	5	2:00
2022-08-25	Win	(Thailand) Gulapphet Sonpichai	Patong Boxing Stadium	Phuket, Thailand	TKO	3	
2022-07-02	Win	(Thailand) Nuafaa Sor.Songpam		Hua Hin, Thailand	TKO	3	
2022-04-30	Win	(Thailand) Nong Bell Phetpirat		Hua Hin, Thailand	TKO	4	
2022-02-25	Win	(Thailand) Nong Aim GT Fitness		Hua Hin, Thailand	Decision	5	2:00
2021-12-19	Win	(Thailand) Petchrodtang Sungilaboplab		Phuket, Thailand	TKO	2	
2021-03-18	Win	(Thailand) Phettae Kaewsamrit		Chaiyaphum, Thailand	TKO	2	
2020-12-12	Win	(Thailand) Aiyara Kohyaomuaythai	Muay Kard Chuek	Songkhla, Thailand	Decision	3	3:00
2020-11-21	Win	(Thailand) Jumliat Phetsimuen		Phatthalung, Thailand	KO	2	
2020-10-23	Win	(Thailand) Namthip Sor.Anucha	MahakramMuaykokietSanjorn SomsernkantorntrielChiangRai + Parkodamfight SuekMadamOh	Chiang Rai, Thailand	Decision	5	3:00
Wins 112 lbs IPCC World title
2020-03-08	Win	(Thailand) Palmy Or.Sanitpan	Thapae Boxing Stadium	Chiang Rai, Thailand	Decision	5	3:00
2020-02-09	Win	(Thailand) Phetampu Kiatpetmongkol	Patong Boxing Stadium	Phuket, Thailand	Decision	5	3:00
2020-02-08	Win	(Thailand) Kulappet Sornpichai	Patong Boxing Stadium	Phuket, Thailand	TKO	3	
2020-01-06	Win	(Thailand) Pornpan Por.Muangpet	Grand Boxing Stadium	Hua Hin, Thailand	Decision	5	3:00
2020-01-02	Win	(Thailand) Namthip Sor.Anucha		Chiang Mai, Thailand	Decision	5	3:00
2019-12-25	Win	(Thailand) Kulabdam Kohyaomuaythai	Muay Kard Chuek	Khao Lak, Thailand	TKO	4	
2019-11-15	Loss	(Thailand) Nongpon Singwangcha	Grand Boxing Stadium	Hua Hin, Thailand	Decision	5	3:00
2019-11-11	Win	(Thailand) Aiyara Kohyaomuaythai	Muay Kard Chuek	Nakhon Pathom, Thailand	TKO	4	
2019-11-09	Win	(Thailand) Khaotommat Sitpootong	Hua Hin Boxing Stadium	Hua Hin, Thailand	TKO	3	
2019-10-31	Loss	(Thailand) Dangkongfah Jaoseuanoimuaythai		Khorat, Thailand	Decision	5	3:00
2019-10-11	Win	(Thailand) Nanghong Liangprasert	Anusarn Ring	Chiang Rai, Thailand	Decision	5	3:00
2019-10-09	Win	(Thailand) Namthip Sor.Anucha	Anusarn Ring	Chiang Mai, Thailand	TKO	4	
2019-09-27	Draw	(Thailand) Rungarun Suan NongnuchaPattaya	Muay Kard Chuek	Lopburi, Thailand	Time limit	5	3:00
2019-09-22	Loss	(Thailand) Kulabpit Ayumuaythai	JF Boxing Stadium	Pattaya, Thailand	Decision	3	3:00
2019-09-13	Win	(Thailand) Namthip Sor.Anucha	Anusarn Ring	Chiang Mai, Thailand	Decision	5	3:00
2019-09-11	Win	(Thailand) Phetnamnueng R.R.Kelalampang	Chiang Mai Boxing Stadium	Chiang Mai, Thailand	TKO	2	
2019-08-30	Win	(Thailand) Nanghong Liangprasert	Anusarn Ring	Chiang Mai, Thailand	Decision	5	3:00
2019-08-28	Loss	(Thailand) Palmy Or.Sanitpan	Anusarn Ring	Chiang Mai, Thailand	Decision	5	3:00
2019-08-24	Win	(Thailand) Jomkwan SitThongsak	Hua Hin Boxing Stadium	Hua Hin, Thailand	Decision	5	3:00
2019-07-29	Win	(Thailand) Palmy Or.Sanitpan	Thapae Stadium	Chiang Mai, Thailand	Decision	5	3:00
2019-07-27	Win	(Thailand) Jomkwan SitThongsak	Hua Hin Boxing Stadium	Hua Hin, Thailand	KO	4	
2019-06-27	Win	(Thailand) Palmy Or.Sanitpan	Thapae Stadium	Chiang Mai, Japan	TKO	4	
2019-06-06	Loss	(Thailand) Hongthong Liangprasert	Thapae Stadium	Chiang Mai, Thailand	Decision	5	3:00
2019-05-11	Win	(Thailand) Nongbenz Sakchatri		Chiang Rai, Thailand	TKO	3	
Wins 105 lbs IPCC World title
2019-04-24	Win	(Thailand) Hongthong Liangprasert		Chiang Mai, Thailand	Decision	5	3:00
2019-04-22	Win	(Thailand) Namthip Sor.Anucha	Thapae Stadium	Chiang Mai, Thailand	TKO	3	
2019-04-14	Win	(Thailand) Sangmanee Sor.Prasongchai		Trat, Thailand	Decision	5	3:00
2019-03-21	Loss	(Thailand) Palmy Or.Sanitpan	Thapae Stadium	Chiang Mai, Thailand	Decision	5	3:00
2019-03-15	Win	(Thailand) Phetngerntong Mor.Krunghtepthonburi	Muay Kard Chuek	Nakhon Pathom, Thailand	Decision	5	3:00
2019-03-10	Win	(Thailand) Palmy Or.Sanitpan		Chiang Mai, Thailand	Decision	5	3:00
2019-02-27	Win	(Thailand) Nongbenz Sakchatri	Thapae Stadium	Chiang Mai, Thailand	KO	4	
2019-02-01	Win	(Thailand) Darphet LampangUniversity	Thapae Stadium	Chiang Mai, Thailand	TKO	3	
2019-01-14	Loss	(Thailand) Thanonchanok Kaewsamrit	Thapae Stadium	Chiang Mai, Thailand	Decision	5	3:00
2018-12-22	Loss	(Thailand) Nongbenz Sakchatri	Thapae Stadium	Chiang Mai, Thailand	Decision	5	3:00
2018-11-26	Win	(Thailand) Nanghong Liangprasert	Thapae Stadium	Chiang Mai, Thailand	TKO	4	
2018-11-26	Draw	(Thailand) Nongnan Wor.Wor.Kelasukhotai	Muay Kard Chuek	Phitsanulok, Thailand	Time limit	5	3:00
2018-11-08	Win	(Thailand) Hongmorakot Liangprasert	Thapae Stadium	Chiang Mai, Thailand	KO	5	
2018-10-26	Win	(Thailand) Thanonchanok Kaewsamrit	Thapae Stadium	Chiang Mai, Thailand	Decision	5	3:00
2018-10-08	Win	(Thailand) Payayong SSChiangmai	Thapae Stadium	Chiang Mai, Thailand	Decision	5	3:00
2018-09-24	Loss	(Thailand) Payayong SSChiangmai	Thapae Stadium	Chiang Mai, Thailand	Decision	5	3:00
2018-09-12	Win	(Thailand) Phetseerung Wor.Worakon	Thapae Stadium	Chiang Mai, Thailand	TKO	4	
2018-08-31	Win	(Thailand) Motdaeng Cherngtalaymuaythai	Muay Kard Chuek	Lopburi, Thailand	TKO	3	
2018-08-22	Loss	(Thailand) Palmy Or.Sanitpan	Thapae Stadium	Chiang Mai, Thailand	TKO (doctor stoppage)	3	
2018-08-01	Win	(Thailand) Petseerung Wor.Worakon	Thapae Stadium	Chiang Mai, Thailand	Decision	5	3:00
2018-07-30	Loss	(Thailand) Wondergirl Lookjaroonsak		Bangkok, Thailand	Decision	5	3:00
2018-07-06	Loss	(Thailand) Nongbenz Sitdobwad	Thapae Stadium	Chiang Mai, Thailand	Decision	5	3:00
2018-06-19	Win	(Thailand) Nanghong Liangprasert	Thapae Stadium	Chiang Mai, Thailand	Decision	5	3:00
2018-06-09	Win	(Thailand) Hongthong Liangprasert	Thapae Stadium	Chiang Mai, Thailand	Decision	5	3:00
2012-06-07	Win	(Thailand) Nanghong Liangprasert		Uttaradit, Thailand	Decision	5	3:00
2018-05-30	Win	(Thailand) Muangsingjiew Or.Wanchert	Thepprasit Boxing Stadium	Pattaya, Thailand	Decision	5	3:00
2018-05-22	Win	(Thailand) Nongbenz Sitdobwad	Thapae Stadium	Chiang Mai, Thailand	Decision	5	3:00
2018-05-04	Loss	(Thailand) Nongprae Sitjenwong		Roi Et, Thailand	Decision	5	3:00
2018-04-24	Loss	(Thailand) Thanonchanok Kaewsamrit	Thapae Stadium	Chiang Mai, Thailand	Decision	5	3:00
2018-03-19	Win	(Thailand) Phetseerung Wor.Woragon	Thapae Stadium	Chiang Mai, Thailand	Decision	5	3:00
2018-03-16	Loss	(Thailand) Kaewda Por.Muangpet		Ayutthaya, Thailand	Decision	5	3:00
2018-02-28	Win	(Thailand) Muangsingjiew Or.Wanchert		Nakhon Ratchasima, Thailand	Decision	5	3:00
2018-02-17	Win	(Thailand) Duangpen Sitthongsak		Nakhon Ratchasima, Thailand	Decision	5	3:00
2018-01-20	Win	(Thailand) Khaotip Moobangawin	Chiang Mai Boxing Stadium	Chiang Mai, Thailand	KO	2	
2018-01-18	Win	(Thailand) Kulabdam Sor.Nor.Nor.Lampang	Thapae Stadium	Chiang Mai, Thailand	TKO	4	
2017-12-29	Draw	(Thailand) Phetyodying Mor.Rajabhatchombueng	Muay Kard Chuek	Suphan Buri, Thailand	Time limit	5	3:00
2017-12-22	Win	(Thailand) Nongnit Chor.Jaylimchai	Chiang Mai Boxing Stadium	Chiang Mai, Thailand	TKO	3	
2017-12-20	Win	(Thailand) Ticha R.R.Kelakhorat	Thapae Stadium	Chiang Mai, Thailand	Decision	5	3:00
2017-11-25	Loss	(Thailand) Thaksapon Intachai	Muay Kard Chuek	Prachinburi, Thailand	Decision	5	3:00
2017-11-14	Loss	(Thailand) Nong Biew	Thepprasit Stadium	Pattaya, Thailand	TKO (stoppage)	5	
2017-11-03	Draw	(Thailand) Hongkhao Sor.Sayan	Muay Kard Chuek	Pathum Thani, Thailand	time limit	5	3:00
2017-10-24	Win	(Thailand) Payayong S.S.Chiangmai	Thapae Stadium	Chiang Mai, Thailand	Decision	5	3:00
2017-10-09	Win	(Thailand) Sudsiam Sor.Sumalee	Chiang Mai Boxing Stadium	Chiang Mai, Thailand	Decision	5	3:00
2017-10-08	Win	(Thailand) Hongthong Liangprasert	Thapae Stadium	Chiang Mai, Thailand	Decision	5	3:00
2017-09-28	Win	(Thailand) Daolomduan Mekvolum	Thepprasit Stadium	Pattaya, Thailand	TKO	4	
Wins 105 lbs Thepprasit Stadium title
2017-09-21	Win	(Thailand) Koogik Soonkelaboplap	Muay Kard Chuek, Siam Plaza	Nakhon Pathom, Thailand	TKO	4	
2017-09-15	Win	(Thailand) Phetseerung Wor.Woragon	Thapae Stadium	Chiang Mai, Thailand	TKO	4	
2017-09-14	Loss	(Thailand) Sudsiam Sor.Sumalee	Chiang Mai Boxing Stadium	Chiang Mai, Thailand	Decision	5	3:00
2017-08-25	Loss	(Thailand) Muangsingjiew Or.Wanchert		Suphan Buri, Thailand	Decision	5	3:00
2017-07-18	Win	(Thailand) Nanghong Liangprasert	Thapae Stadium	Chiang Mai, Thailand	Decision	5	3:00
2017-09-17	Win	(Thailand) Honey Bor.Boondit	Chiang Mai Boxing Stadium	Chiang Mai, Thailand	Decision	5	3:00
2017-07-07	Draw	(Thailand) Thaksapon Intachai	Muay Kard Chuek	Suphan Buri, Thailand	Time limit	5	3:00
2017-06-29	Win	(Thailand) Kulabkhao Kiatnumpotong	Thapae Stadium	Chiang Mai, Thailand	TKO	4	
2017-06-16	Draw	(Thailand) Phetyodying Mor.Rabjabhatchombueng	Muay Kard Chuek	Nakhon Pathom, Thailand	Time limit	5	3:00
2017-06-02	Win	(Thailand) Payayong S.SChiangmai	Thapae Stadium	Chiang Mai, Thailand	Decision	5	3:00
2017-05-06	Loss	(Thailand) Thanonchanok Kaewsamrit	Thapae Stadium	Chiang Mai, Thailand	Decision	5	3:00
2017-05-02	Win	(Thailand) Sudsiam Sor.Sumalee	Thapae Stadium	Chiang Mai, Thailand	Decision	5	3:00
2017-04-22	Win	(Thailand) Duanpen Sitthongsak		Khorat, Thailand	Decision	5	3:00
2017-04-10	Win	(Thailand) Nong-On Bor.Buipoonput		Chiang Mai, Thailand	TKO	3	
2017-04-08	Win	(Thailand) NongKwangtong Phettongput		Chiang Mai, Thailand	Decision	5	3:00
2017-04-06	Win	(Thailand) NongMorakot Liangprasert		Chiang Mai, Thailand	TKO	4	
2017-03-28	Loss	(Thailand) Stamp Kiatboongern	Thepprasit Stadium	Pattaya, Thailand	Decision	5	3:00
For the 108 lbs Thepprasit Stadium title
2017-03-16	Win	(Thailand) Sudsiam Sor.Sumalee	Thapae Stadium	Chiang Mai, Thailand	Decision	5	3:00
2017-02-25	Win	(Thailand) Nantida Sitweerachat		Nong Bua Lam Phu, Thailand	Decision	5	3:00
2017-02-20	Loss	(Thailand) Thanonchanok Kaewsamrit		Chiang Mai, Thailand	Decision	5	3:00
2017-02-18	Win	(Thailand) Yodying Sor.Sumalee	Thapae Stadium	Chiang Mai, Thailand	TKO	3	
2017-02-10	Win	(Thailand) NongMat Huasarayiam		Nakhon Ratchasima, Thailand	Decision	5	3:00
2017-02-06	Loss	(Thailand) Zaza Sor.Aree		Bangkok, Thailand	Decision	5	3:00
2017-01-29	Loss	(Thailand) Fahchiangrai Sor.Sakunthong		Lopburi, Thailand	Decision	5	3:00
2017-01-24	Win	(Thailand) Baifern Bor.Buipoonput	U.S.A vs Thailand, Kawilla Stadium	Chiang Mai, Thailand	Decision	5	3:00
2017-01-07	Loss	(Thailand) Nanghong Liangprasert	Thapae Stadium	Chiang Mai, Thailand	TKO (cut)	5	3:00
2016-12-24	Win	(Thailand) Namwan Senyentafo		Chiang Mai, Thailand	Decision	5	3:00
2016-12-23	Loss	(Thailand) Thanonchanok Kaewsamrit	Kawilla Stadium	Chiang Mai, Thailand	Decision	5	3:00
2016-12-21	Win	(Thailand) Hongpet Liangprasert	Thapae Stadium	Chiang Mai, Thailand	TKO	3	
2016-12-05	Loss	(Thailand) Mari Veronafarm	King Rama IX Memorial, Lumpinee Park	Bangkok, Thailand	Decision	5	3:00
For the 115 lbs WMC World title
2016-11-17	Win	(Thailand) Nongkwangtong Phettonpung		Chiang Mai, Thailand	Decision	5	3:00
2016-11-16	Win	(Thailand) Thanonchanok Kaewsamrit		Chiang Mai, Thailand	Decision	5	3:00
2016-11-09	Win	(Thailand) Nongkwangtong Phettonpung		Chiang Mai, Thailand	Decision	5	3:00
2016-11-08	Win	(Thailand) Nongbenz Sitdobwad	Thapae Stadium	Chiang Mai, Thailand	TKO	3	
2016-10-08	Win	(Thailand) Gretay Sitjaypa		Buriram, Thailand	TKO	3	
2016-10-07	Win	(Thailand) Nantida Sitweerachat		Khorat, Thailand	Decision	5	3:00
2016-09-30	Win	(Thailand) Ochin Sitthongsak	Suranaree Stadium	Khorat, Thailand	TKO	2	
2016-09-10	Win	(Thailand) Nongfern Nakhonpanomwitayakom	Thapae Stadium	Chiang Mai, Thailand	TKO	4	
2016-08-22	Loss	(Thailand) Kaewda Por.Muangpet		Suphanburi, Thailand	Decision	5	3:00
2016-08-12	Loss	(Thailand) Loma Lookboonmee	Asiatique Mall	Bangkok, Thailand	Decision	3	3:00
2016-07-22	Win	(Thailand) Nongnaen Mor.Krungthepthonburi	Grand Boxing Stadium	Hua Hin, Thailand	TKO	4	
2016-06-28	Win	(Thailand) Denkaewsa Baengarenggym		Chiang Mai, Thailand	Decision	5	3:00
2016-06-27	Win	(Thailand) Phetdawan SitYodpayaklampang	Chiang Mai Bowing Stadium	Chiang Mai, Thailand	TKO	4	
2016-06-25	Win	(Thailand) Fahgnam Wangchompu	Chiang Rai University	Chiang Rai, Thailand	TKO	4	
2016-06-01	Win	(Thailand) Baifern Por.Puipoonput	Thapae Stadium	Chiang Mai, Thailand	Decision	5	3:00
2016-05-27	Loss	(Thailand) Fahchiangrai Sor.Sakulthong		Prachinburi, Thailand	Decision	5	3:00
2016-04-23	Win	(Thailand) Fahchiangrai Sor.Sakulthong	Wat Chaiyo Worawihan	Ang Thong, Thailand	Decision	5	3:00
2016-04-16	Win	(Thailand) Phetwapee Chor.Decha		Hua Hin, Thailand	Decision	5	3:00
2016-04-15	Win	(Thailand) Kaenkaew Kor.Klomkliao		Nakhon Nayok, Thailand	Decision	5	3:00
2016-04-13	Win	(Thailand) Rungnapa Por.Muangpet	Santi Chai Prakan Park	Bangkok, Thailand	Decision	5	3:00
2016-03-17	Win	(Thailand) Duangdaonoi Looklongfan		Ayutthaya, Thailand	Decision	5	3:00
2016-03-04	Win	(Thailand) Fahchiangrai Sor.Sakulthong		Chiang Rai, Thailand	Decision	5	3:00
For the 105 lbs Muay Siam Northern Thailand title
2016-03-01	Win	(Thailand) Fahchiangrai Sor.Sakulthong	Thepprasit Stadium	Pattaya, Thailand	Decision	5	3:00
2016-02-21	Win	(Thailand) Nongsom Sor.Wassana		Khorat, Thailand	TKO	3	
2016-02-13	Loss	(Thailand) Jomkwan Sitthongsak	Rajabhat Maha Sarakham University	Maha Sarakham, Thailand	Decision	5	3:00
2016-02-05	Win	(United States) Gianna Cuello	Grand Boxing Stadium	Hua Hin, Thailand	Decision	5	3:00
2016-01-15	Win	(Thailand) Fahchiangrai Sor.Sakulthong	Chiang Mai Boxing Stadium	Chiang Mai, Thailand	Decision	5	3:00
2016-01-08	Win	(Thailand) Jompu Por.Penprapa	Rajabhat Maha Sarakham University	Maha Sarakham, Thailand	TKO	4	
2016-01-05	Win	(Thailand) Mintza Por.Samingdam	Thepprasit Stadium	Pattaya, Thailand	TKO	3	
2015-12-27	Win	(Thailand) Ploynapa Sakrungruang	Wat Hom Sin	Samut Prakan, Thailand	TKO	2	
2015-12-18	Loss	(Thailand) Loma Lookboonmee	Grand Boxing Stadium	Hua Hin, Thailand	Decision	5	3:00
2015-12-07	Loss	(Thailand) Rungnapa Por.Muangphet		Chonburi, Thailand	Decision	5	3:00
2015-12-03	Win	(Thailand) Nongbenz Sitdobwad	Chiang Mai Bowing Stadium	Chiang Mai, Thailand	TKO	3	
2015-11-30	Loss	(Thailand) Muangsingjiew Or.Wanchert	Thapae Stadium	Lopburi, Thailand	Decision	5	3:00
2015-11-25	Win	(Thailand) Chalamlek Phetdaotan	Thapae Stadium	Chonburi, Thailand	Decision	5	3:00
For the 112 lbs Loi Krathong title
2015-11-17	Win	(Thailand) Kaewda Por.Muangphet	Thepprasit Stadium	Pattaya, Thailand	Decision	5	3:00
2015-11-09	Win	(Thailand) Platutong Por.Kiatgym		Udon Thani, Thailand	TKO	4	
2015-11-08	Win	(Thailand) Rungnapa Por.Muangphet		Chonburi, Thailand	Decision	5	3:00
For the 105 lbs Buffalo race Festival title
2015-11-02	Win	(Thailand) Nongnui Sitdobwad	Chiang Mai Bowing Stadium	Chiang Mai, Thailand	TKO	3	
2015-10-20	Win	(Thailand) Rungnapa Por.Muangphet	Thepprasit Stadium	Pattaya, Thailand	Decision	5	3:00
2015-10-07	Loss	(Thailand) Baifern Bor.Buipoonput	Thapae Stadium	Chiang Mai, Thailand	Decision	5	3:00
2015-09-29	Loss	(Thailand) Kaewda Por.Muangphet	Thepprasit Stadium	Pattaya, Thailand	Decision	5	3:00
2015-08-21	Loss	(Thailand) Cherry Kor.Twingym	Savan Vegas Casino	Savannakhet, Laos	Decision	5	3:00
2015-08-12	Loss	(Thailand) Kaewda Por.Muangphet	Queen's Birthday, Sanam Luang	Bangkok, Thailand	Decision	5	3:00
2015-08-05	Win	(Thailand) Jomkwan Sitthongsak	Suranaree Stadium	Khorat, Thailand	Decision	5	3:00
2015-07-05	Loss	(Thailand) Nongying Phettonpung		Chiang Mai, Thailand	Decision	5	3:00
2015-07-03	Win	(Thailand) Kraidatong Por.Promin	Grand Boxing Stadium	Hua Hin, Thailand	Decision	5	3:00
2015-06-12	Win	(Thailand) Superbon Paladongym	Grand Boxing Stadium	Hua Hin, Thailand	TKO	1	
2015-06-04	Win	(Thailand) Nanghong Liangprasert	Thapae Stadium	Chiang Mai, Thailand	Decision	5	3:00
2015-05-01	Loss	(Thailand) Cherry Kor.Twingym	Kalare Stadium	Chiang Mai, Thailand	Decision	5	3:00
2015-04-27	Win	(Thailand) Rungtiwa Kiatmongkol		Trat, Thailand	TKO	3	
2015-04-25	Win	(Thailand) Nongmai Sor.Phetsuphan		Sa Kaeo, Thailand	TKO	3	
2015-04-19	Loss	(Thailand) Loma Lookboonmee		Chonburi, Thailand	Decision	5	3:00
2015-04-11	Loss	(Thailand) Lookget Payalampong		Chachoengsao, Thailand	Decision	5	3:00
2015-03-26	Loss	(Thailand) Nongrung Sitkrudaeng		Chanthaburi, Thailand	Decision	5	3:00
2015-03-17	Win	(Thailand) Saotai Sor.Somgiatgym		Ayutthaya, Thailand	Decision	5	3:00
2015-03-08	Win	(Thailand) Lookget Payalampong		Khorat, Thailand	Decision	5	3:00
2015-02-22	Win	(Thailand) Kaewda Por.Muangpet		Chachoengsao, Thailand	Decision	5	3:00
2015-02-20	Loss	(Thailand) Nongfah Tor.Buamas		Khon Kaen, Thailand	Decision	5	3:00
2015-02-15	Loss	(Thailand) Loma Lookboonmee		Khorat, Thailand	Decision	5	3:00
2015-02-09	Loss	(Thailand) Thanonchanok Kaewsamrit	Kalare Stadium	Chiang Mai, Thailand	Decision	5	3:00
2015-02-06	Win	(Thailand) Baifern Por.Buipoonbut	Kalare Stadium	Chiang Mai, Thailand	Decision	5	3:00
2015-01-25	Win	(Thailand) Muangsingjiew Or.Wanchert		Suphan Buri, Thailand	Decision	5	3:00
2015-01-04	Win	(Thailand) Muangsingjiew Or.Wanchert	Max Muay Thai Stadium	Pattaya, Thailand	Decision	3	3:00
2014-12-30	Win	(Thailand) Phetnaree Phetsakchai		Surin, Thailand	TKO	3	
2014-12-15	Win	(Thailand) Cherry Sityodtong	Thepprasit Stadium	Chiang Mai, Thailand	TKO	4	
2014-12-05	Win	(Thailand) Thaksaporn Intachai		Hua Hin, Thailand	Decision	5	3:00
2014-12-01	Win	(Thailand) Chalamlek Phetdaotan	Thepprasit Stadium	Pattaya, Thailand	Decision	5	3:00
2014-11-18	Win	(Thailand) Nongnoon Mor.Krunghtepthonburi		Si Racha, Thailand	TKO	3	
2014-11-16	Win	(Thailand) Saochongaen Sor.Sampon		Bangkok, Thailand	TKO	3	
2014-11-15	Win	(Thailand) Newnamchok Sor.Wilachat		Buriram, Thailand	TKO	2	
2014-11-06	Win	(Thailand) Muaylek Or.Janubon		Prachinburi, Thailand	Decision	5	3:00
2014-11-05	Draw	(Thailand) Chalamlek Petdaotan		Chonburi, Thailand	Decision	5	3:00
2014-11-01	Win	(Thailand) "Kanda Por.Muangphet"		Buriram, Thailand	TKO	2	
2014-10-26	Win	(Thailand) Tawan Sitpoosakrasidtong		Rayong, Thailand	TKO	3	
2014-10-25	Win	(Thailand) Kangwan Sor.Praithong		Bangkok, Thailand	TKO	3	
2014-10-17	Win	(Thailand) Namtan-A Sitthailand		Buriram, Thailand	TKO	4	
2014-10-06	Win	(Thailand) Muangchonlek Sor.Hengcharoen	Chua Kraow Stadium	Chonburi, Thailand	TKO	4	
For the 105 lbs Buffalo Race Festival title
2014-10-04	Win	(Thailand) Sam-A Sit		Maha Sarakham, Thailand	TKO	3	
2014-09-29	Loss	(Thailand) Star Sor.Klimnee	Thepprasit Stadium	Chiang Mai, Thailand	Decision	5	3:00
2014-09-15	Win	(Thailand) Phetseegnern Sor.Adisorn	Suranaree Stadium	Khorat, Thailand	TKO	4	
2014-08-26	Win	(Thailand) Nongna Lookponak		Buriram, Thailand	TKO	2	
2014-08-12	Win	(Japan) Saya Ito		Bangkok, Thailand	Decision	5	3:00
2014-08-08	Loss	(Thailand) Cherry Sityodtong	Pattaya World Boxing Stadium	Pattaya, Thailand	Decision	5	3:00
2014-07-04	Win	(Thailand) Benchamin Looktaidon	Pattaya World Boxing Stadium	Pattaya, Thailand	TKO	2	
2014-06-13	Win	(Thailand) Kaewda Por.Muangphet	Thepprasit Stadium	Pattaya, Thailand	Decision	5	3:00
2014-05-18	Win	(Thailand) Baifern Bor.Buipoonput	Thapae Stadium	Chiang Mai, Thailand	TKO (cut)	3	
2014-05-05	Win	(Thailand) Gwantong Pettriantong	Thapae Stadium	Chiang Mai, Thailand	TKO	4	
2014-04-21	Loss	(Thailand) Nongem Tor.Witthaya	Thapae Stadium	Chiang Mai, Thailand	Decision	5	3:00
2014-04-17	Win	(Thailand) Nongploy WPChiangmai		Chiang Mai, Thailand	TKO (doctor stoppage)	3	
2014-04-09	Win	(Thailand) Phetdara Sitkruod		Chiang Mai, Thailand	TKO (elbows & knees)	4	
2014-04-05	Loss	(Thailand) Nongpin Phettonpueng		Chiang Mai, Thailand	Decision	5	3:00
2014-04-02	Win	(Thailand) Pupae Soongeelamoo7		Chiang Mai, Thailand	TKO	2	
2014-03-25	Win	(Thailand) Phetdara Sitkruod		Chiang Mai, Thailand	Decision	5	3:00
2014-03-18	Win	(Thailand) Nongtoy Yodkhunsuk		Chiang Mai, Thailand	TKO	3	
2014-02-19	Loss	(Thailand) Lommanee Sor.Hiran	Pattaya Boxing World Stadium	Pattaya, Thailand	TKO (doctor stoppage)	2	
2014-02-07	Loss	(Thailand) Star Sor.Klimnee	Pattaya Boxing World Stadium	Pattaya, Thailand	Decision	3	3:00
2014-01-31	Win	(Thailand) Duangphet Sitputia	Pattaya Boxing World Stadium	Pattaya, Thailand	TKO	2	
2014-01-11	Win	(Thailand) Namwan Senyentafo		Chiang Mai, Thailand	Decision	5	3:00
2013-12-28	Loss	(Thailand) Nongem Tor.Witthaya		Chiang Mai, Thailand	Decision	5	3:00
2013-12-22	Loss	(Thailand) Nongphet Kor.Saklampun		Chiang Mai, Thailand	Decision	5	3:00
2013-12-08	Loss	(Thailand) Sudsiam Sor.Sumalee	Maejo University	Chiang Mai, Thailand	Decision	5	3:00
2013-11-30	Loss	(Thailand) Thanonchanok Kaewsamrit		Lampang, Thailand	Decision	5	3:00
2013-11-16	Loss	(Thailand) Cherry Kor.Towingym		Chiang Mai, Thailand	Decision	5	3:00
2013-11-10	Loss	(Thailand) Phetnamgarm Phettongpueng		Chiang Mai, Thailand	Decision	5	3:00
2013-11-02	Loss	(Thailand) Nongploy WPChiangmai		Chiang Mai, Thailand	Decision	5	3:00
2013-10-23	Loss	(Thailand) Hongfah Sitjenok		Chiang Mai, Thailand	TKO (knees)	3	
2013-10-20	Win	(Thailand) Phetlanna Phettongpueng		Chiang Mai, Thailand	TKO (knees)	4	
2013-10-14	Win	(Thailand) Nongmai Sor.Phetphupan		Chiang Mai, Thailand	TKO (knees)	4	
2013-10-10	Win	(Thailand) Seuaphet Liangprasert	Thapae Stadium	Chiang Mai, Thailand	TKO (knees)	3	
2013-09-28	Win	(Thailand) Cherry Kor.Towingym	Thapae Stadium	Chiang Mai, Thailand	Decision	5	3:00
2013-09-16	Win	(Thailand) Tukatatong Pichitman	Thapae Stadium	Chiang Mai, Thailand	TKO (knees)	2	
2013-08-30	Loss	(Thailand) Sudsiam Sor.Sumalee	Kalare Stadium	Chiang Mai, Thailand	Decision	5	3:00
2013-08-23	Win	(Thailand) Fahchiangrai Sor.Sakulthong	Kalare Stadium	Chiang Mai, Thailand	Decision	5	3:00
2013-08-12	Win	(Thailand) Yodying Sor.Sumalee	Kalare Stadium	Chiang Mai, Thailand	Decision	5	3:00
2013-07-26	Win	(Thailand) Yodying Sor.Sumalee	Kalare Stadium	Chiang Mai, Thailand	Decision	5	3:00
2013-07-16	Loss	(Thailand) Yodying Sor.Sumalee	Kalare Stadium	Chiang Mai, Thailand	Decision	5	3:00
2013-07-12	Win	(Thailand) Kulabhin Sor.Chalermchai	Kalare Stadium	Chiang Mai, Thailand	TKO (knees)	3	
2013-06-28	Loss	(Thailand) Muangsingjiew Or.Wanchert	700 Year Stadium	Chiang Mai, Thailand	Decision	5	3:00
2013-06-01	Win	(Thailand) Nongying Phettongpueng		Chiang Mai, Thailand	TKO	2	
2013-05-25	Win	(Thailand) Phetmuangfang Sor.Sor.Chiangmai		Chiang Mai, Thailand	Decision	5	3:00
2013-05-18	Loss	(Thailand) Fahchiangrai Sor.Sakulthong		Chiang Mai, Thailand	Decision	5	3:00
2013-05-08	Win	(Thailand) Phetmuangfang Sor.Sor.Chiangmai		Chiang Mai, Thailand	Decision	5	3:00
2013-05-01	Win	(Thailand) Nongkwangngern Sitthahanek		Chiang Mai, Thailand	Decision	5	3:00
2013-04-11	Draw	(Thailand) Fahchiangrai Sor.Sakulthong		Chiang Mai, Thailand	Decision	5	3:00
2013-03-26	Loss	(Thailand) Nongkwangngern Sitthahanek		Phayao, Thailand	Decision	5	3:00
2013-03-19	Win	(Thailand) Nongkwangngern Sitthahanek	Kalare Stadium	Chiang Mai, Thailand	TKO (knees)	3	
2013-03-08	Win	(Thailand) Nongying Phettongpueng	Kalare Stadium	Chiang Mai, Thailand	TKO (knees)	3	
2013-03-01	Win	(Thailand) Yodying Sor.Sumalee	Kalare Stadium	Chiang Mai, Thailand	TKO (knees)	4	
2013-02-15	Loss	(Thailand) Yodying Sor.Sumalee	Kalare Stadium	Chiang Mai, Thailand	Decision	5	3:00
2013-02-09	Loss	(Thailand) Nongmai Sitrapee		Chiang Mai, Thailand	Decision	5	3:00
2013-01-22	Loss	(Thailand) Yodying Sor.Sumalee	Kalare Stadium	Chiang Mai, Thailand	Decision	5	3:00
2013-01-12	Win	(Thailand) Nongmaem Por.Puipoonput	Kalare Stadium	Chiang Mai, Thailand	Decision	5	3:00
2012-12-11	Draw	(Thailand) Phetjing J.A.Gym	Kalare Stadium	Chiang Mai, Thailand	Decision	5	3:00
2012-12-05	Win	(Thailand) Yodying Sor.Sumalee	King's Birthday	Chiang Mai, Thailand	Decision	5	3:00
2012-11-29	Win	(Thailand) Nongploy WPChiangmai		Chiang Rai, Thailand	TKO (knees)	2	
2012-11-16	Win	(Thailand) Kendo WPChiangmai	Kalare Stadium	Chiang Mai, Thailand	TKO (knees)	3	
2012-11-03	Win	(Thailand) Kwangngern Wor.Bor		Chiang Mai, Thailand	TKO	4	
2012-10-26	Win	(Thailand) Saolampang J.A.Gym	Kalare Stadium	Chiang Mai, Thailand	Decision	5	3:00
2012-10-12	Win	(Thailand) Yodying Sor.Sumalee	Kalare Stadium	Chiang Mai, Thailand	TKO (knees)	2	
2012-10-02	Win	(Thailand) Thaemtong Sittongplee		Chiang Mai, Thailand	TKO	3	
2012-09-21	Loss	(Thailand) Phetchaodoi J.A.Gym	Kalare Stadium	Chiang Mai, Thailand	Decision	5	3:00
2012-08-31	Win	(Thailand) Yodying Sor.Sumalee	Kalare Stadium	Chiang Mai, Thailand	Decision	5	3:00
2012-08-17	Loss	(Thailand) Phetchaodoi J.A.Gym	Kalare Stadium	Chiang Mai, Thailand	Decision	5	3:00
2012-07-27	Win	(Thailand) Yodying Sor.Sumalee	Kalare Stadium	Chiang Mai, Thailand	TKO (knees)	4	
2012-07-13	Loss	(Thailand) Yodying Sor.Sumalee	Kalare Stadium	Chiang Mai, Thailand	Decision	5	3:00
2012-06-29	Draw	(Thailand) Phetngama J.A.Gym	Kalare Stadium	Chiang Mai, Thailand	Decision	5	3:00
2012-06-20	Win	(Thailand) Phetkarat Phettongpueng		Chiang Mai, Thailand	TKO (knees)	3	
2012-06-09	Win	(Thailand)		Chiang Mai, Thailand	TKO (elbows)	2	
2012-05-25	Win	(Thailand) Payaksaw Phettongpueng		Chiang Mai, Thailand	TKO	2	
2012-05-11	Loss	(Thailand) Phetkarat Phettongpueng	Kalare Stadium	Chiang Mai, Thailand	Decision	5	3:00
2012-04-27	Loss	(Thailand) Phetngama J.A.Gym	Kalare Stadium	Chiang Mai, Thailand	Decision	5	3:00
2012-04-20	Win	(Thailand)	Kalare Stadium	Chiang Mai, Thailand	TKO (knees)	1	
2010-03-05	Loss	(United States) Tori Richardson	Modified Kickboxing rules	Bangkok, Thailand	Decision	3	3:00
2010-02-16	Win	(Thailand)		Chiang Mai, Thailand	TKO (body kick)	2	
2010-02-02	Win	(Thailand)		Chiang Mai, Thailand	TKO (knees)	2	
Legend: Win Loss Draw/No contest Notes

Amateur Muay Thai record
2 Wins (1 (T)KO's), 8 Losses, 0 Draws
Date	Result	Opponent	Event	Location	Method	Round	Time
2012-01-20	Loss	(United States) Angela Hill	Friday Night Fights	Manhattan, U.S.A	Decision	5	3:00
2011-09-20	Loss	(United States) Patti Teran	Lion Fight 3	Las Vegas, U.S.A	Decision	5	3:00
2011-05-13	Loss	(United States) Jessica Ng	Take-on Productions	Queens, U.S.A	Decision	5	3:00
2011-04-30	Loss	(United States) Giovanna Camacho	Gleason's Gym, Boxing rules	Brooklyn, U.S.A	Decision	5	3:00
2011-03-04	Loss	(United States) Angela Hill	Friday Night Fights	Manhattan, U.S.A	Decision	5	3:00
2010-12-11	Loss	(Thailand) Piloshmee Deonarain	Take-on Productions	Queens, U.S.A	Decision	5	3:00
2010-10-18	Loss	(United States) Tanya Lohr	Take-on Productions	Queens, U.S.A	Decision	5	3:00
2010-07-18	Win	(United States) Jessica Ng	Take-on Productions	Queens, U.S.A	Decision	5	3:00
2010-06-11	Win	(United States) Min Godspeed	Friday Night Fights	United States	TKO	2	
2009-06-27	Loss	(Thailand) Piloshmee Deonarain	WKA Nationals	Richmond, U.S.A	Decision	5	3:00
Legend: Win Loss Draw/No contest Notes

== Professional boxing record ==
5 fights	4 wins	1 loss
By knockout	3	0
By decision	1	1
By disqualification	0	0
Draws	0	
No contests	0	

Result	Record	Opponent	Type	Round, Time	Date	Location	Notes
Win	4–1	(Thailand) Wandee Sinongkhrot	TKO (Retirement)	Round 2 of 6, End of Round	July 18, 2026	Thanyaburi, Thailand	Thai Payak Fight
Win	3–1	(Thailand) Katsara Jatpukdee	Decision, Unanimous	6 Rounds, 12:00 Total	October 26, 2025	Thanyaburi, Thailand	Thai Payak Fight 9
Win	2–1	(Thailand) Manatsanan Srithongkham	TKO	1:45 Round 2 of 6, 3:45 Total	June 21, 2025	Thanyaburi, Thailand	Thai Payak Fight 7
Win	1–1	(Thailand) Phanit Yongyut	TKO (Retirement)	2:00 Round 4 of 6, 8:00 Total	February 28, 2025	Thanyaburi, Thailand	Thai Payak Fight 5
Loss	0–1	(Thailand) Wandee Sinongkhrot	Decision (Unanimous)	4 Rounds, 8:00 Total	November 29, 2024	Thanyaburi, Thailand	Thai Payak Fight 2
