= Ban Haet railway station =

Railway station in Thailand

Ban Haet บ้านแฮด

General information
- Location: Ban Haet Subdistrict, Ban Haet District; Khon Kaen Province; Thailand
- Coordinates: 16°11′52″N 102°45′58″E
- Operator: State Railway of Thailand
- Line: Nong Khai Main Line
- Platforms: 4
- Tracks: 4

Construction
- Structure type: At-grade

Other information
- Station code: ฮด.
- Classification: Class 3

History
- Rebuilt: 2019

Services
Preceding station	State Railway of Thailand	Following station
Ban Phai towards Hua Lamphong or Krung Thep Aphiwat	Northeastern Line	Tha Phra towards Khamsavath (Laos)
Location

Ban Haet station (Thai: สถานีบ้านแฮด) is a railway station located in Ban Haet Subdistrict, Ban Haet District, Khon Kaen Province. It is a class 3 railway station located 423.60 km (263.2 mi) from Bangkok railway station. The station was rebuilt in 2019 as part of the double tracking project between Thanon Chira Junction and Khon Kaen.
