= Nong Maeo railway station =

Railway station in Thailand

Nong Maeo หนองแมว

General information
- Location: Dan Khla Subdistrict, Non Sung District; Nakhon Ratchasima Province; Thailand
- Coordinates: 15°08′28″N 102°12′58″E
- Operator: State Railway of Thailand
- Line: Nong Khai Main Line
- Platforms: 2
- Tracks: 2

Construction
- Structure type: At-grade

Other information
- Station code: นง.
- Classification: Class 3

History
- Rebuilt: 2019

Services
Preceding station	State Railway of Thailand	Following station
Ban Nong Kan Nga Halt towards Hua Lamphong or Krung Thep Aphiwat	Northeastern Line	Non Sung towards Khamsavath (Laos)
Location

Nong Maeo railway station is a railway station located in Dan Khla Subdistrict, Non Sung District, Nakhon Ratchasima Province. It is a class 3 railway station located 289.79 km (180.1 mi) from Bangkok railway station. The station was rebuilt in 2019 as part of the double tracking project between Thanon Chira Junction and Khon Kaen.
