= Nong Makhuea railway station =

Railway station in Thailand

Nong Makhuea หนองมะเขือ

General information
- Location: Non Kha Subdistrict, Phon District; Khon Kaen Province; Thailand
- Coordinates: 15°45′30″N 102°34′03″E
- Operator: State Railway of Thailand
- Line: Nong Khai Main Line
- Platforms: 2
- Tracks: 2

Construction
- Structure type: At-grade

Other information
- Station code: งอ.
- Classification: Class 3

History
- Rebuilt: 2019

Services
Preceding station	State Railway of Thailand	Following station
Sala Din Halt towards Hua Lamphong or Krung Thep Aphiwat	Northeastern Line	Mueang Phon towards Khamsavath (Laos)
Location

Nong Makhuea railway station is a railway station located in Non Kha Subdistrict, Phon District, Khon Kaen Province. It is a class 3 railway station located 370.04 km (229.9 mi) from Bangkok railway station.

== History ==
The station was rebuilt in 2019 as part of the double tracking project between Thanon Chira Junction and Khon Kaen.
