= Thanyaburi =

Thanyaburi may refer to:

- Thanyaburi District, Pathum Thani province, Thailand
- Thanyaburi Town, town in Thanyaburi district
