= Ban Han railway station =

Railway station in Thailand

Ban Han บ้านหัน

General information
- Location: Non Sila Subdistrict, Non Sila District; Khon Kaen Province; Thailand
- Coordinates: 15°57′57″N 102°41′38″E
- Operator: State Railway of Thailand
- Line: Nong Khai Main Line
- Platforms: 4
- Tracks: 4

Construction
- Structure type: At-grade

Other information
- Station code: าห.
- Classification: Class 2

History
- Rebuilt: 2019

Services
Preceding station	State Railway of Thailand	Following station
Mueang Phon towards Hua Lamphong or Krung Thep Aphiwat	Northeastern Line	Ban Phai towards Khamsavath (Laos)
Location

Ban Han station (Thai: สถานีบ้านหัน) is a railway station located in Non Sila Subdistrict, Non Sila District, Khon Kaen Province. It is a class 2 railway station located 396.82 km (246.6 mi) from Bangkok railway station. The station was rebuilt in 2019 as part of the double tracking project between Thanon Chira Junction and Khon Kaen.
