= Ban Don Yai railway station =

Railway station in Thailand

Ban Don Yai บ้านดอนใหญ่

General information
- Location: Don Yai Subdistrict, Khong District; Nakhon Ratchasima Province; Thailand
- Coordinates: 15°23′22″N 102°18′46″E
- Operator: State Railway of Thailand
- Line: Nong Khai Main Line
- Platforms: 2
- Tracks: 2

Construction
- Structure type: At-grade

Other information
- Station code: ดญ.
- Classification: Class 3

History
- Rebuilt: 2019

Services
Preceding station	State Railway of Thailand	Following station
Phon Songkhram towards Hua Lamphong or Krung Thep Aphiwat	Northeastern Line	Mueang Khong towards Khamsavath (Laos)
Location

Ban Don Yai station (Thai: สถานีบ้านดอนใหญ่) is a railway station located in Don Yai Subdistrict, Khong District, Nakhon Ratchasima Province. It is a class 3 railway station located 320.35 km (199.1 mi) from Bangkok railway station. The station was rebuilt in 2019 as part of the double tracking project between Thanon Chira Junction and Khon Kaen.
