= Non Sung railway station =

Railway station in Thailand

Non Sung โนนสูง

General information
- Location: Non Sung Subdistrict, Non Sung District; Nakhon Ratchasima Province; Thailand
- Coordinates: 15°10′36″N 102°14′54″E
- Operator: State Railway of Thailand
- Manager: Ministry of Transport
- Line: Nong Khai Main Line
- Platforms: 4
- Tracks: 4

Construction
- Structure type: At-grade

Other information
- Station code: นโ.
- Classification: Class 1

History
- Rebuilt: 2019

Services
Preceding station	State Railway of Thailand	Following station
Nong Maeo towards Hua Lamphong or Krung Thep Aphiwat	Northeastern Line	Ban Dong Phlong towards Khamsavath (Laos)
Location

Non Sung railway station is a railway station located in Non Sung Subdistrict, Non Sung District, Nakhon Ratchasima Province. It is a class 1 railway station located 295.08 km (183.4 mi) from Bangkok railway station and is the main station for Non Sung District. The station was rebuilt in 2019 as part of the double tracking project between Thanon Chira Junction and Khon Kaen.
