= Ban Dong Phlong railway station =

Railway station in Thailand

Ban Dong Phlong บ้านดงพลอง

General information
- Location: Lum Khao Subdistrict, Non Sung District; Nakhon Ratchasima Province; Thailand
- Coordinates: 15°13′32″N 102°17′20″E
- Operator: State Railway of Thailand
- Line: Nong Khai Main Line
- Platforms: 2
- Tracks: 2

Construction
- Structure type: At-grade

Other information
- Station code: ดพ.
- Classification: Class 3

History
- Rebuilt: 2019

Services
Preceding station	State Railway of Thailand	Following station
Non Sung towards Hua Lamphong or Krung Thep Aphiwat	Northeastern Line	Ban Makha towards Khamsavath (Laos)
Location

Ban Dong Phlong station (Thai: สถานีบ้านดงพลอง) is a railway station located in Lum Khao Subdistrict, Non Sung District, Nakhon Ratchasima Province. It is a class 3 railway station located 302.19 km (187.8 mi) from Bangkok railway station. The station was rebuilt in 2019 as part of the double tracking project between Thanon Chira Junction and Khon Kaen.
