= Mueang Khong railway station =

Railway station in Thailand

Mueang Khong เมืองคง

General information
- Location: Mueang Khong Subdistrict, Khong District; Nakhon Ratchasima Province; Thailand
- Coordinates: 15°26′42″N 102°19′53″E
- Operator: State Railway of Thailand
- Manager: Ministry of Transport
- Line: Nong Khai Main Line
- Platforms: 4
- Tracks: 4

Construction
- Structure type: At-grade

Other information
- Station code: งค.
- Classification: Class 1

History
- Rebuilt: 2019

Services
Preceding station	State Railway of Thailand	Following station
Ban Don Yai towards Hua Lamphong or Krung Thep Aphiwat	Northeastern Line	Ban Rai Halt towards Khamsavath (Laos)
Location

Mueang Khong railway station is a railway station located in Mueang Khong Subdistrict, Khong District, Nakhon Ratchasima Province. It is a class 1 railway station located 326.80 km (203.1 mi) from Bangkok railway station and is the main station for Khong District. The station was rebuilt in 2019 as part of the double tracking project between Thanon Chira Junction and Khon Kaen.
