= Mueang Phon railway station =

Railway station in Thailand

Mueang Phon เมืองพล
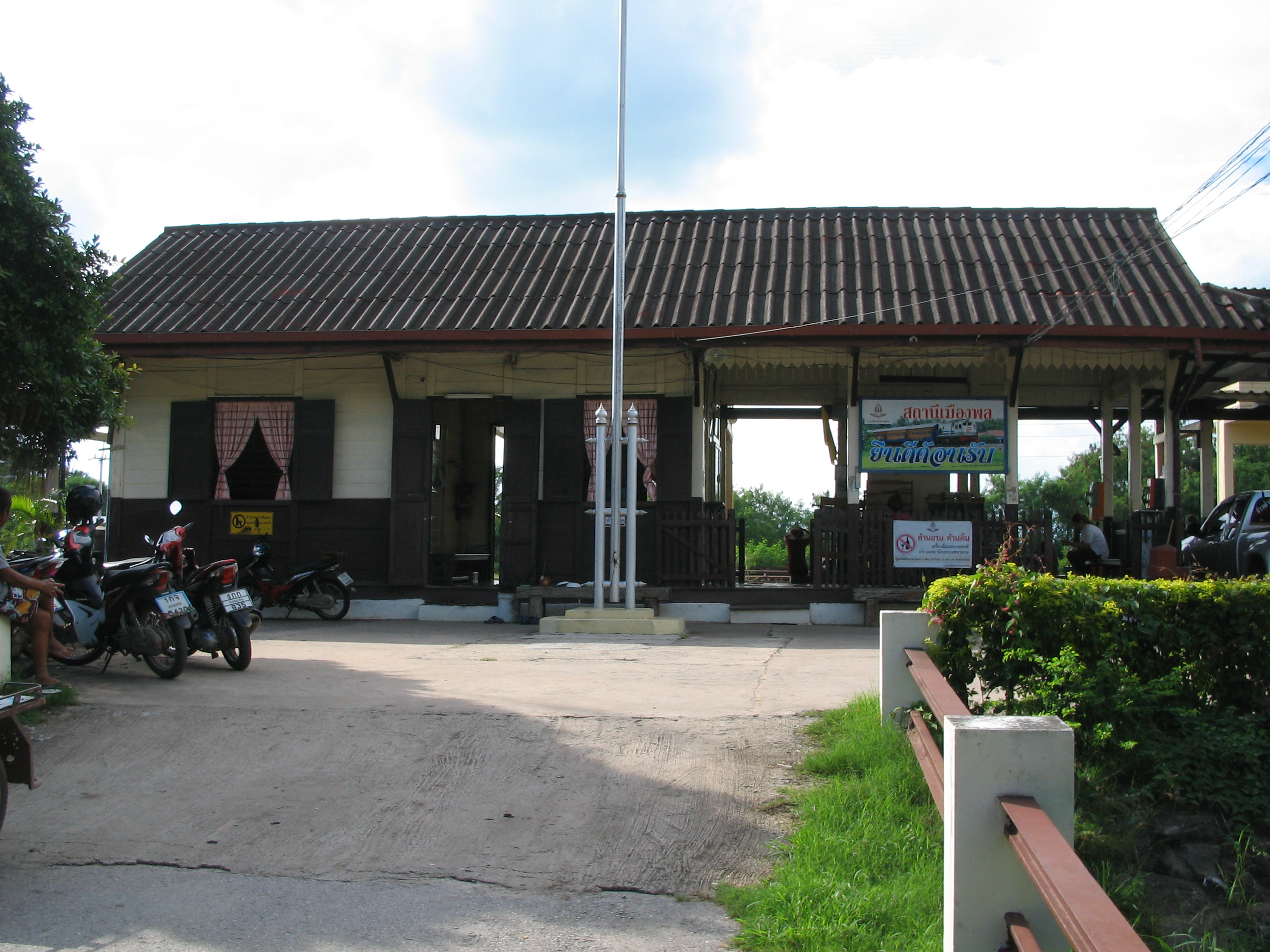
- Mueang Phon in 2015

General information
- Location: Mueang Phon Subdistrict, Phon District; Khon Kaen Province; Thailand
- Coordinates: 15°49′11″N 102°36′03″E
- Operator: State Railway of Thailand
- Manager: Ministry of Transport
- Line: Nong Khai Main Line
- Platforms: 4
- Tracks: 4

Construction
- Structure type: At-grade

Other information
- Station code: อล.
- Classification: Class 1

History
- Rebuilt: 2019

Services
Preceding station	State Railway of Thailand	Following station
Nong Makhuea towards Hua Lamphong or Krung Thep Aphiwat	Northeastern Line	Ban Han towards Khamsavath (Laos)
Location

Mueang Phon railway station is a railway station located in Mueang Phon Subdistrict, Phon District, Khon Kaen Province. It is a class 1 railway station located 377.66 km (234.7 mi) from Bangkok railway station and is the main station for Phon District. The station was rebuilt in 2019 as part of the double tracking project between Thanon Chira Junction and Khon Kaen.
