= Ban Makha railway station =

Railway station in Thailand

Ban Makha บ้านมะค่า

General information
- Location: Makha Subdistrict, Non Sung District; Nakhon Ratchasima Province; Thailand
- Coordinates: 15°16′52″N 102°17′44″E
- Operator: State Railway of Thailand
- Line: Nong Khai Main Line
- Platforms: 2
- Tracks: 2

Construction
- Structure type: At-grade

Other information
- Station code: มค.
- Classification: Class 3

History
- Rebuilt: 2019

Services
Preceding station	State Railway of Thailand	Following station
Ban Dong Phlong towards Hua Lamphong or Krung Thep Aphiwat	Northeastern Line	Noen Thua Paep Halt towards Khamsavath (Laos)
Location

Ban Makha station (Thai: สถานีบ้านมะค่า) is a railway station located in Makha Subdistrict, Non Sung District, Nakhon Ratchasima Province. It is a class 3 railway station located 308.20 km (191.5 mi) from Bangkok railway station. The station was rebuilt in 2019 as part of the double tracking project between Thanon Chira Junction and Khon Kaen.
