= Phon Songkhram railway station =

Railway station in Thailand

Phon Songkhram พลสงคราม

General information
- Location: Phon Songkhram Subdistrict, Non Sung District; Nakhon Ratchasima Province; Thailand
- Coordinates: 15°20′54″N 102°18′12″E
- Operator: State Railway of Thailand
- Line: Nong Khai Main Line
- Platforms: 4
- Tracks: 4

Construction
- Structure type: At-grade

Other information
- Station code: พค.
- Classification: Class 3

History
- Rebuilt: 2019

Services
Preceding station	State Railway of Thailand	Following station
Noen Thua Paep Halt towards Hua Lamphong or Krung Thep Aphiwat	Northeastern Line	Ban Don Yai towards Khamsavath (Laos)
Location

Phon Songkhram railway station is a railway station located in Phon Songkhram Subdistrict, Non Sung District, Nakhon Ratchasima Province. It is a class 3 railway station located 315.65 km (196.1 mi) from Bangkok railway station. The station was rebuilt in 2019 as part of the double tracking project between Thanon Chira Junction and Khon Kaen.
