= Udon Thani =

Udon Thani อุดรธานี Udon
- City municipality
- City of Udon Thani เทศบาลนครอุดรธานี
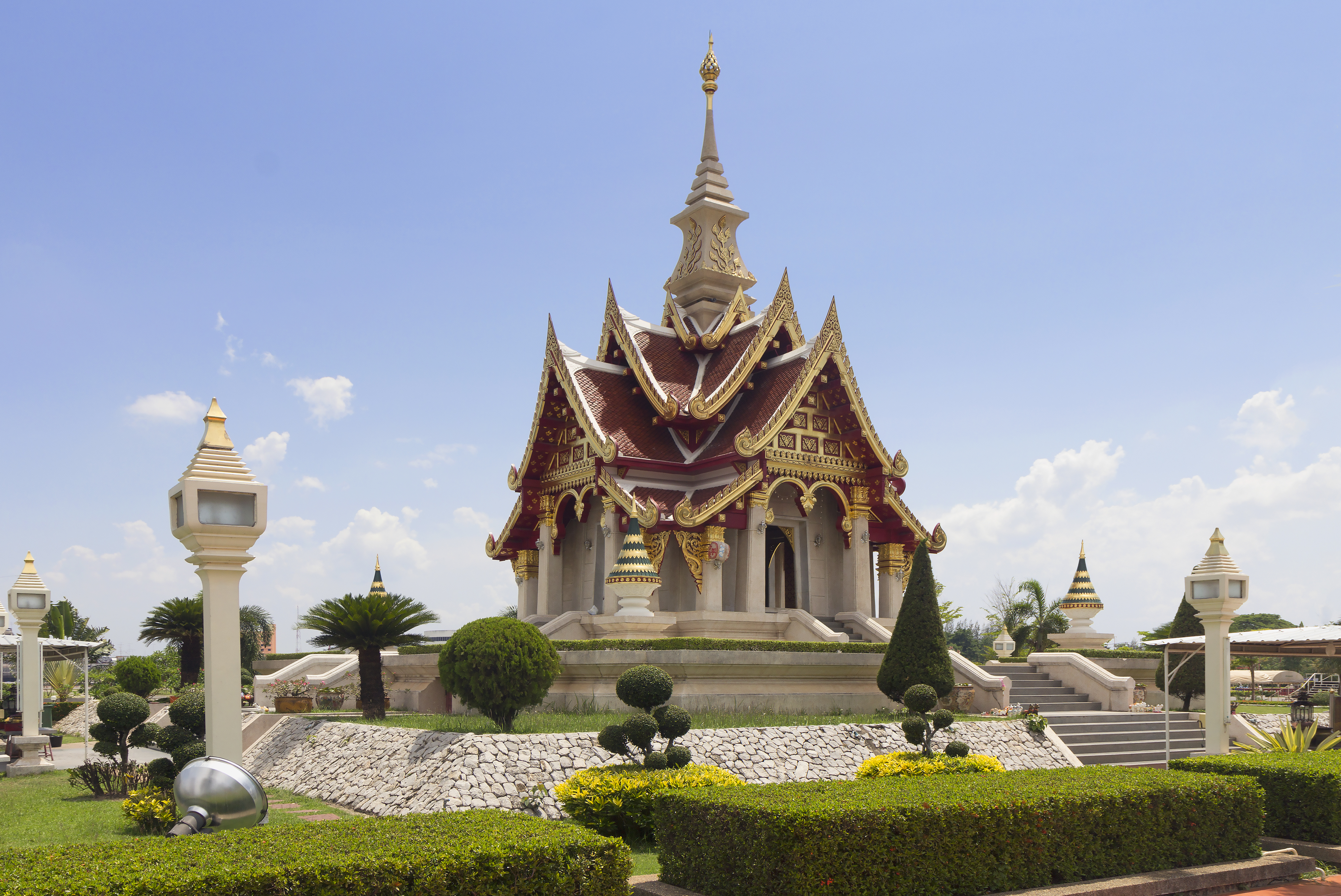
- City pillar shrine of Udon Thani

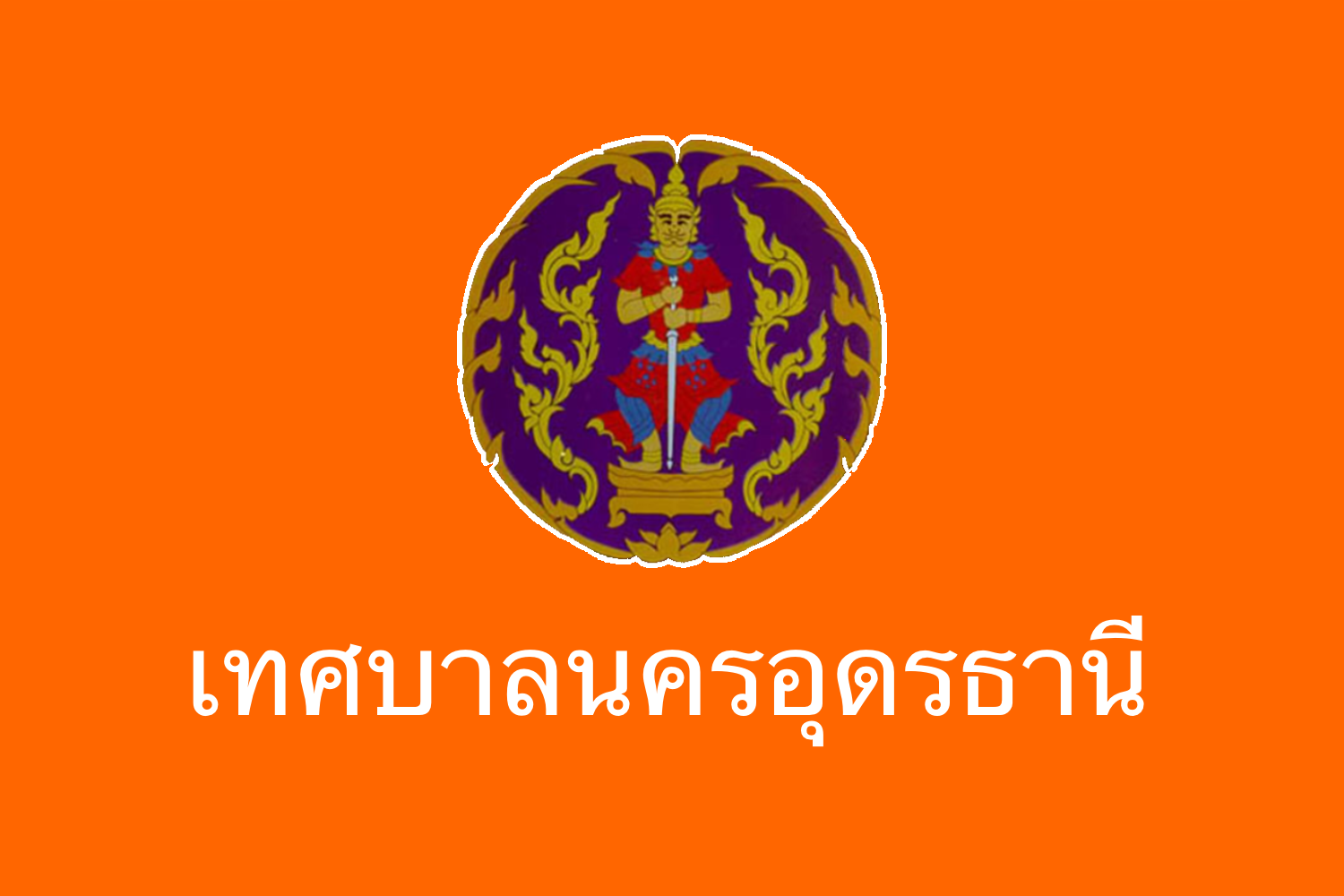
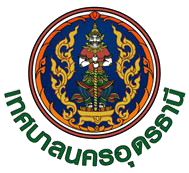
- Flag Seal

- Location in Thailand
- Coordinates: 17°25′0″N 102°45′00″E
- Country: Thailand
- Province: Udon Thani
- District: Mueang Udon Thani
- Town municipality: 14 March 1936
- City municipality: 25 September 1995

Government
  - Type: City Municipality
  - Mayor: Itthipol Treewatanasuwan

Area
  - City municipality: 47.7 km^{2} (18.4 sq mi)
  - Metro: 1,095 km^{2} (423 sq mi)
  - Rank: 9th

Population (2019)
  - City municipality: 130,531 (Registered residents)
  - Rank: 9th in Thailand
  - Density: 2,736/km^{2} (7,090/sq mi)
  - Metro: 430,000
  - Metro density: 393/km^{2} (1,020/sq mi)
- Time zone: UTC+7 (ICT)
- Postcode: 41000
- Calling code: 042
- Website: udoncity.go.th

Udon Thani (Thai: อุดรธานี, pronounced [ʔù.dɔ̄ːn tʰāː.nīː]) is a city in Isan (Northeast Thailand), the capital of Udon Thani province and the sixth largest city in Thailand. The city municipality (thesaban nakhon / city proper) had a population of 130,531 people as of 2019, while Udon Thani's urban area, Mueang Udon Thani, has a population of approximately 400,000. Udon Thani is one of four major cities in Isan, the others being Nakhon Ratchasima, Ubon Ratchathani, and Khon Kaen. Together they are known as the "big four of Isan".

== Location ==
Udon is approximately 560 km from Bangkok. It is a major official and commercial center in northern Isan, Thailand, and the gateway to Laos, northern Vietnam, and southern China.

== History ==
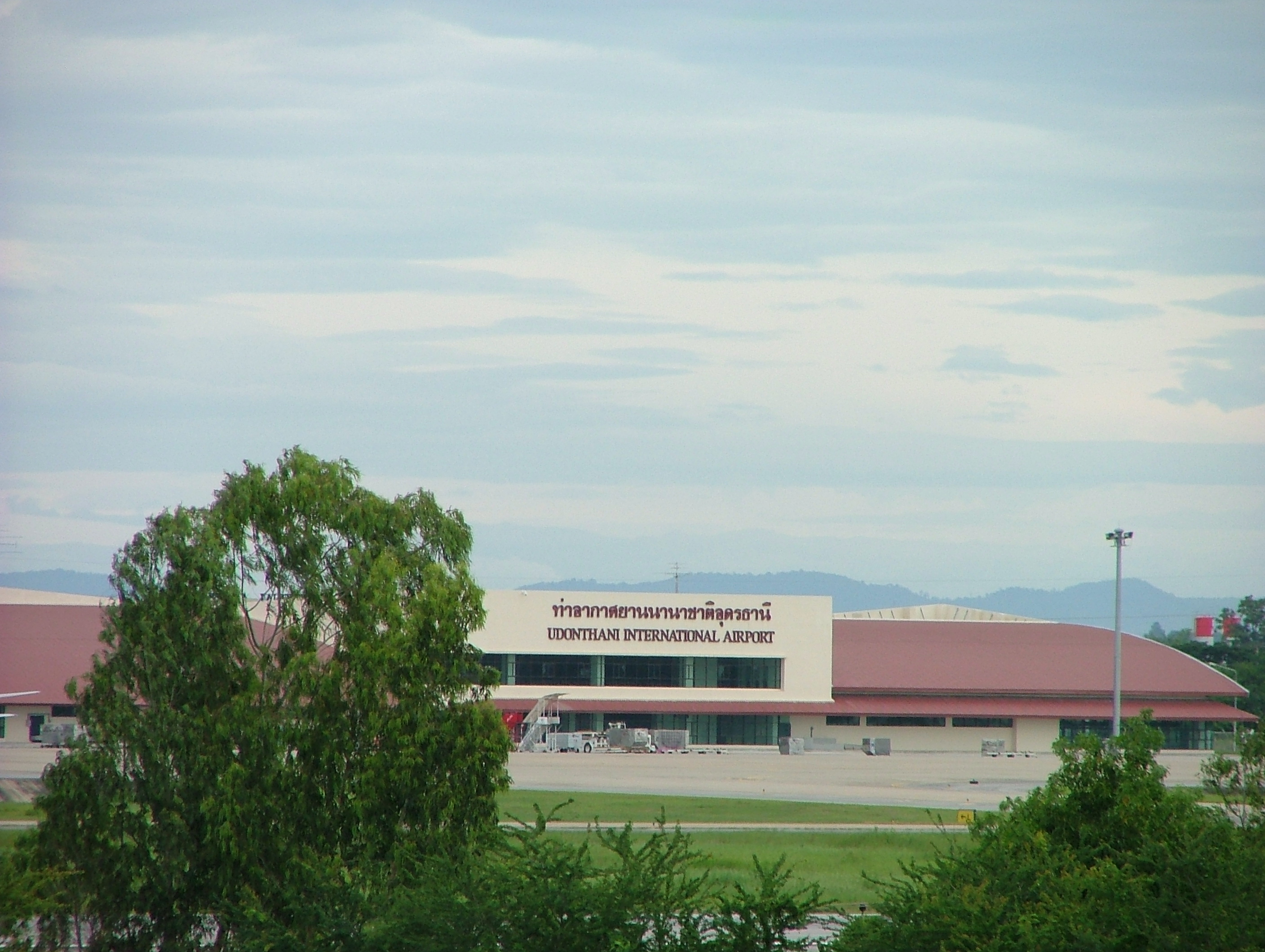
Udon Thani International Airport

The city's economy was boosted by the proximity to Udorn Royal Thai Air Force Base during the Vietnam War and retains reminders of that time in the form of bars, coffee shops, and hotels. "Udon sort of became like Pattaya when the GIs arrived," said a local architect. "Restaurants serving Western cuisine, hotels and nightclubs sprouted up everywhere to meet their needs. It was an extremely busy city back then."

The BBC has reported that Udon Thani's Royal Air Force Base was the site of a CIA black site, known to insiders as "Detention Site Green", used to interrogate Abu Zubaydah, Saudi-born Palestinian, believed to be one of Osama bin Laden's top lieutenants. In December 2014 the United States Senate Select Committee on Intelligence (SSCI) published an executive summary of a secret 6,000-page report on CIA techniques. The report alleges that at least eight Thai senior officials knew of the secret site. The site was closed in December 2002.

Earlier reports alleged that a Voice of America relay station in a rural area of Udon Thani Province, Ban Dung District, was the CIA black site.

== Administration ==
Udon Thani town municipality (thesaban mueang) with an area of 5.6 km^{2} (2.2 sq mi) was established on 15 March 1936. On 27 May 1953, the area covered by the municipality was increased to 8.3 km^{2} (3.2 sq mi). As a result of the town's continuing growth, the total area of the municipality was enlarged for the second time to 47.7 km^{2} (18.4 sq mi). on 31 December 1993. On 25 September 1995 Udon Thani was upgraded to city municipality (thesaban nakhon), and is divided into 21 sub-districts (tambons), which are further subdivided into 248 villages (mubans). (chumchon), 130,531 people in 60,659 households.

== Transport ==
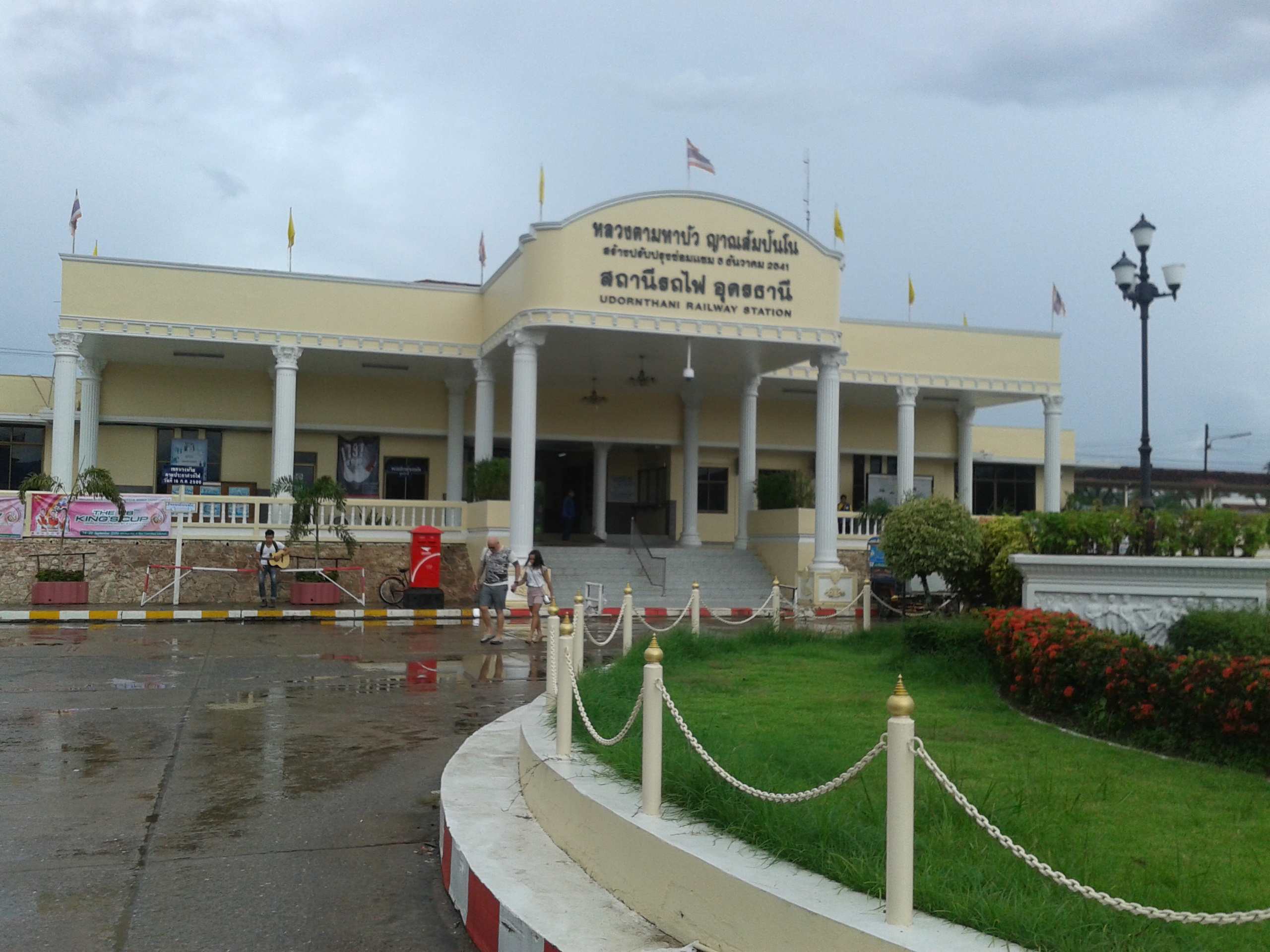
Udon Thani Railway Station

Udon Thani International Airport, close to the city centre (within the ring road), serves a number of domestic airports: Chiang Mai International Airport, U-Tapao International Airport (Pattaya), and Phuket, with approximately 24 daily flights to Bangkok (Don Mueang International and Suvarnabhumi Airport). During the 2020-2021 COVID-19 pandemic flights were reduced to 10-14 daily to Bangkok airports only.

Udon Thani railway station in the city centre receives four trains daily from Bangkok railway station (Hua Lamphong) including overnight sleepers.

== Economy ==
=== Mining ===
Asia Pacific Potash Corporation (APPC), a wholly owned subsidiary of Italian-Thai Development PLC, owns the concession to the Udon North and Udon South potash mines and plans to develop them. Potash deposits in northeast Thailand are believed to contain the world's third-largest—after Canada and Russia—unexploited potash reserves. Potash is one of the main components of agricultural fertilizer.

== Climate ==
Udon Thani has a tropical savanna climate (Köppen climate classification Aw). Winters are fairly dry and very warm. Temperatures rise until April, which is hot with the average daily maximum at 36.2 °C (97.2 °F). The monsoon season runs from late-April through early-October, with heavy rain and somewhat cooler temperatures during the day, although nights remain warm. The range of reliably recorded temperatures in the city is from 2.5 °C (36.5 °F) to 44.1 °C (111.4 °F).

Climate data for Udon Thani (1991–2020, extremes 1951-present)
Month	Jan	Feb	Mar	Apr	May	Jun	Jul	Aug	Sep	Oct	Nov	Dec	Year
Record high °C (°F)	37.6 (99.7)	39.2 (102.6)	42.0 (107.6)	44.1 (111.4)	43.4 (110.1)	38.6 (101.5)	39.8 (103.6)	36.5 (97.7)	36.8 (98.2)	37.2 (99.0)	37.0 (98.6)	35.6 (96.1)	44.1 (111.4)
Mean daily maximum °C (°F)	30.3 (86.5)	32.7 (90.9)	35.2 (95.4)	36.5 (97.7)	35.0 (95.0)	33.6 (92.5)	32.8 (91.0)	32.2 (90.0)	32.2 (90.0)	32.0 (89.6)	31.4 (88.5)	29.5 (85.1)	32.8 (91.0)
Daily mean °C (°F)	23.1 (73.6)	25.2 (77.4)	28.2 (82.8)	29.9 (85.8)	29.2 (84.6)	28.8 (83.8)	28.3 (82.9)	27.8 (82.0)	27.7 (81.9)	27.1 (80.8)	25.3 (77.5)	22.9 (73.2)	27.0 (80.5)
Mean daily minimum °C (°F)	16.7 (62.1)	18.6 (65.5)	22.0 (71.6)	24.4 (75.9)	25.0 (77.0)	25.1 (77.2)	25.0 (77.0)	24.6 (76.3)	24.3 (75.7)	22.9 (73.2)	20.0 (68.0)	16.7 (62.1)	22.1 (71.8)
Record low °C (°F)	2.5 (36.5)	7.8 (46.0)	11.5 (52.7)	15.7 (60.3)	20.4 (68.7)	21.5 (70.7)	21.2 (70.2)	21.1 (70.0)	21.0 (69.8)	14.2 (57.6)	8.4 (47.1)	4.2 (39.6)	2.5 (36.5)
Average precipitation mm (inches)	6.4 (0.25)	21.2 (0.83)	50.2 (1.98)	73.0 (2.87)	188.3 (7.41)	218.5 (8.60)	224.8 (8.85)	298.9 (11.77)	249.5 (9.82)	94.3 (3.71)	14.0 (0.55)	5.8 (0.23)	1,444.9 (56.89)
Average precipitation days (≥ 1.0 mm)	0.9	1.9	3.7	5.2	12.9	14.7	16.1	18.1	14.2	6.1	1.2	0.5	95.5
Average relative humidity (%)	65.8	62.7	61.0	63.3	73.3	77.5	78.8	81.1	81.4	75.1	69.2	67.0	71.4
Mean monthly sunshine hours	272.8	259.9	275.9	243.0	198.4	156.0	120.9	117.8	144.0	198.4	252.0	257.3	2,496.4
Mean daily sunshine hours	8.8	9.2	8.9	8.1	6.4	5.2	3.9	3.8	4.8	6.4	8.4	8.3	6.9
Source 1: World Meteorological Organization, (extremes)
Source 2: Office of Water Management and Hydrology, Royal Irrigation Department (sun 1981–2010)

== Sister cities ==
- Bandung, West Java, Indonesia
- Reno, Nevada, United States
- Lusaka, Zambia
