= Loma Lookboonmee =

Thai martial artist

- Born: Suphisara Konlack (สุภิสรา คนหลัก); January 18, 1996 (age 30); Buriram, Thailand
- Native name: โลมา ลูกบุญมี
- Other names: Kanda Por Muangpetch; Kanda Kokietgym; Loma Sitjaou
- Height: 5 ft 1 in (1.55 m)
- Weight: 115 lb (52 kg; 8 st)
- Division: Atomweight (2019); Strawweight (2019–present)
- Reach: 61 1/2 in (156 cm)
- Style: Muay Thai
- Fighting out of: Phuket, Thailand
- Team: Tiger Muay Thai (2017–2021); Bangtao Muay Thai & MMA (2021–present)
- Trainer: George Hickman
- Rank: Purple belt in Brazilian Jiu Jitsu

Professional boxing record
- Total: 7
- Wins: 6
- Losses: 1

Mixed martial arts record
- Total: 15
- Wins: 10
- By knockout: 1
- By submission: 1
- By decision: 8
- Losses: 5
- By submission: 2
- By decision: 3

Other information
- Boxing record from BoxRec
- Mixed martial arts record from Sherdog

Suphisara Konlak (Thai: สุภิสรา คนหลัก) (born January 18, 1996), known professionally as Loma Lookboonmee (Thai: โลมา ลูกบุญมี), is a Thai martial artist who has competed in Muay Thai, boxing, kickboxing, and mixed martial arts. In boxing she has fought under the names Kanda Por Muangpetch (Thai: กานดา พ.เมืองเพชร) and Kanda Kokietgym (Thai: กานดา ก่อเกียรติยิม). She currently competes in the women’s Strawweight division of the Ultimate Fighting Championship (UFC), being the first Thai fighter to sign with the organization.

== Career ==
=== Early career ===
Lookboonmee began training Muay Thai at seven years old at her father Boonmee Suphisara's gym. She began competing against girls, but soon was facing boys due to the lack of competition. She eventually gained several titles and competed for the Thai national team.

Lookboonmee transitioned to mixed martial arts in 2017, training under coach George Hickman at Tiger Muay Thai. She made her amateur debut for Thailand Fighting Championship at the music/MMA festival event RockWars on September 23. She won the bout, submitting Filipina fighter Krisna Limbaga by rear naked choke in the second round, after which she quickly turned pro, signing with Invicta Fighting Championships in October. She made her professional debut in January 2018 at Invicta FC 27. She amassed a record of three wins against one loss before going to the UFC.

=== Ultimate Fighting Championship ===
In September 2019, it was announced that Lookboonmee had signed with the UFC. She made her debut against Aleksandra Albu at UFC on ESPN+ 20. She won the fight via split decision.

Lookboonmee was scheduled to face Hannah Goldy on February 23, 2020 at UFC Fight Night 168. However, Goldy pulled out due to a shoulder injury and was replaced by Angela Hill. She lost the fight via unanimous decision.

Lookboonmee faced Jinh Yu Frey on October 4, 2020 at UFC on ESPN: Holm vs. Aldana. She won the fight via unanimous decision.

As the first bout of her new multi-fight contract, Lookboonmee faced Sam Hughes on May 1, 2021 at UFC on ESPN: Reyes vs. Procházka. She won the bout via unanimous decision.

Lookboonmee was scheduled to face Cheyanne Buys on November 20, 2021 at UFC Fight Night 198. However, Buys withdrew from the bout for undisclosed reasons and she was replaced by Lupita Godinez. She lost the bout via unanimous decision.

Lookboonmee was scheduled to face Diana Belbiţă on September 17, 2022 at UFC Fight Night 210. However, Belbiţă withdraw due to undisclosed reason and was replaced by Denise Gomes. Lookboonmee won the fight via unanimous decision.

As the first bout of her new multi-fight contract, Lookboonmee was scheduled to face Elise Reed on February 4, 2023, at UFC Fight Night 218. However, the pair was moved to UFC 284 for undisclosed reasons. She won the fight via a rear-naked choke submission in the second round.

Lookboonmee faced Bruna Brasil on February 10, 2024, at UFC Fight Night 236, winning the fight via unanimous decision.

Lookboonmee was scheduled to face Ariane Carnelossi on April 5, 2025 at UFC on ESPN 65. However, Carnelossi withdrew from the fight due to an ankle injury and was replaced by Istela Nunes. She won the fight via unanimous decision.

Lookboonmee faced Alexia Thainara on September 28, 2025, at UFC Fight Night 260. She lost the fight by unanimous decision.

Lookboonmee faced Jacqueline Amorim on May 30, 2026, at UFC Fight Night 277. She lost the fight via an armbar in round one.

== Championships and achievements ==
=== Mixed martial arts ===
- Invicta Fighting Championships
  - Fight of the Night (one time) vs. Monique Adriane

=== Muay Thai ===
- Onesongchai
  - 2012 S-1 World -100 lbs Champion
- International Federation of Muaythai Associations
  - 2015 I.F.M.A. World Championship -45 kg Champion
  - 2016 I.F.M.A. World Championship -45 kg runner-up
  - 2017 I.F.M.A. World Championship -48 kg champion
  - 2018 I.F.M.A. World Championship -48 kg champion
  - 2019 I.F.M.A. World Championship -48 kg bronze

== Mixed martial arts record ==
Professional record breakdown
| 15 matches | 10 wins | 5 losses |
| By knockout | 1 | 0 |
| By submission | 1 | 2 |
| By decision | 8 | 3 |

| Res. | Record | Opponent | Method | Event | Date | Round | Time | Location | Notes |
|---|---|---|---|---|---|---|---|---|---|
| Loss | 10–5 | Jaqueline Amorim | Submission (armbar) | UFC Fight Night: Song vs. Figueiredo | May 30, 2026 | 1 | 4:04 | Macau SAR, China | |
| Loss | 10–4 | Alexia Thainara | Decision (unanimous) | UFC Fight Night: Ulberg vs. Reyes | September 28, 2025 | 3 | 5:00 | Perth, Australia | |
| Win | 10–3 | Istela Nunes | Decision (unanimous) | UFC on ESPN: Emmett vs. Murphy | April 5, 2025 | 3 | 5:00 | Las Vegas, Nevada, United States | |
| Win | 9–3 | Bruna Brasil | Decision (unanimous) | UFC Fight Night: Hermansson vs. Pyfer | February 10, 2024 | 3 | 5:00 | Las Vegas, Nevada, United States | |
| Win | 8–3 | Elise Reed | Submission (rear-naked choke) | UFC 284 | February 12, 2023 | 2 | 0:44 | Perth, Australia | |
| Win | 7–3 | Denise Gomes | Decision (unanimous) | UFC Fight Night: Sandhagen vs. Song | September 17, 2022 | 3 | 5:00 | Las Vegas, Nevada, United States | |
| Loss | 6–3 | Lupita Godinez | Decision (unanimous) | UFC Fight Night: Vieira vs. Tate | November 20, 2021 | 3 | 5:00 | Las Vegas, Nevada, United States | |
| Win | 6–2 | Sam Hughes | Decision (unanimous) | UFC on ESPN: Reyes vs. Procházka | May 1, 2021 | 3 | 5:00 | Las Vegas, Nevada, United States | |
| Win | 5–2 | Jinh Yu Frey | Decision (unanimous) | UFC on ESPN: Holm vs. Aldana | October 4, 2020 | 3 | 5:00 | Abu Dhabi, United Arab Emirates | |
| Loss | 4–2 | Angela Hill | Decision (unanimous) | UFC Fight Night: Felder vs. Hooker | February 23, 2020 | 3 | 5:00 | Auckland, New Zealand | |
| Win | 4–1 | Aleksandra Albu | Decision (split) | UFC Fight Night: Maia vs. Askren | October 26, 2019 | 3 | 5:00 | Kallang, Singapore | Strawweight debut. |
| Win | 3–1 | Monique Adriane | Decision (unanimous) | Invicta FC 35 | June 7, 2019 | 3 | 5:00 | Kansas City, Kansas, United States | Fight of the Night. |
| Loss | 2–1 | Suwanan Boonsorn | Submission (armbar) | Full Metal Dojo 16 | November 3, 2018 | 1 | 2:06 | Bangkok, Thailand | For the vacant Full Metal Dojo Atomweight Championship. |
| Win | 2–0 | Hana Date | TKO (punches) | Pancrase 298 | August 5, 2018 | 2 | 4:32 | Tokyo, Japan | |
| Win | 1–0 | Melissa Wang | Decision (unanimous) | Invicta FC 27 | January 13, 2018 | 3 | 5:00 | Kansas City, Missouri, United States | Atomweight debut. |

| Amateur record breakdown | | |
| 1 match | 1 win | 0 losses |
| By submission | 1 | 0 |

| Res. | Record | Opponent | Method | Event | Date | Round | Time | Location | Notes |
|---|---|---|---|---|---|---|---|---|---|
| Win | 1–0 | Krisna Limbaga | Submission (rear-naked choke) | RockWars Pattaya | September 23, 2017 | 2 | 2:13 | Pattaya, Thailand | Strawweight bout. |

== Muay Thai record ==
Professional Muay Thai record
| Date | Result | Opponent | Event | Location | Method | Round | Time |
|---|---|---|---|---|---|---|---|
| 2016-08-12 | Win | (United States) Sylvie Petchrungruang | Road to Abu Dhabi | Bangkok, Thailand | Decision | 3 | 3:00 |
| 2016-07-09 | Win | (Australia) Kim Townsend | Epic Fight Promotions 15: Pride | Perth, Australia | Decision (Unanimous) | 5 | 2:00 |
| 2016-04- | Win | (Thailand) Phetnaree Phetsakchai | | Thailand | Decision | 5 | 2:00 |
| 2015-12-19 | Win | (United States) Sylvie Petchrungruang | | Hua Hin, Thailand | Decision | 5 | 2:00 |
| 2015-04-19 | Win | (United States) Sylvie Petchrungruang | Songkran Show | Bang Saray, Thailand | Decision | 5 | 2:00 |
| 2015-02-15 | Win | (United States) Sylvie Petchrungruang | Pakthongchai Show | Khorat, Thailand | Decision | 5 | 2:00 |
| 2014-09-05 | Win | (Thailand) Plathuthong Sitkwangthong | | Lampang, Thailand | TKO | 4 | |
| 2014-07-30 | Loss | (Thailand) Nongprai Mor.RajabatChombueng | Tha Chang Market | Singburi province, Thailand | Decision | 5 | 2:00 |
| 2013-08-18 | Win | (Thailand) NongAm Jakrapantour | | Lampang, Thailand | Decision | 5 | 2:00 |
| 2013-06-22 | Loss | (United Kingdom) Denise Castle | Muaythai World Series UK vs Thailand | United Kingdom | Decision (Unanimous) | 5 | 2:00 |
Loses S-1 World 100lb title.
| 2012-12-05 | Win | (United Kingdom) Denise Castle | King's Birthday | Bangkok, Thailand | Decision | 5 | 2:00 |
Wins S-1 World 100lb title.
| 2012-12-02 | Loss | (Japan) Erika Kamimura | RISE/M-1 ~Infinity~ | Tokyo, Japan | KO (Right Straight) | 3 | 1:21 |
For the vacant WPMF World Women's Mini Flyweight (105lb) title.
Legend: Win Loss Draw/No contest Notes

Amateur Muay Thai Record
| Date | Result | Opponent | Event | Location | Method | Round | Time |
|---|---|---|---|---|---|---|---|
| 2019-07-27 | Loss | (Australia) Sze Sze Rowlinson | 2019 IFMA World Championship, Semi Final | Bangkok, Thailand | Decision | 3 | 3:00 |
Wins 2019 IFMA World Championship -45kg Bronze Medal.
| 2019-07-25 | Win | (Russia) Vera Buga | 2019 IFMA World Championship, Quarter Final | Bangkok, Thailand | Decision | 3 | 3:00 |
| 2019-07-24 | Win | (Sweden) Jessica Petterson | 2019 IFMA World Championship, Round of 16 | Bangkok, Thailand | Decision | 3 | 3:00 |
| 2018-05-19 | Win | (Russia) Vera Buga | 2018 IFMA World Championship, Final | Cancun, Mexico | Decision | 3 | 3:00 |
Wins 2018 IFMA World Championship -48kg Gold Medal.
| 2018-05-18 | Win | (France) Myriame Djedidi | 2018 IFMA World Championship, Semi Final | Cancun, Mexico | Decision | 3 | 3:00 |
| 2018-05-14 | Win | (Singapore) Cheryl Gwa | 2018 IFMA World Championship, Quarter Final | Cancun, Mexico | Decision | 3 | 3:00 |
| 2018-05-13 | Win | (Czech Republic) Lucie Aubrechtova | 2018 IFMA World Championship, Round of 16 | Cancun, Mexico | Decision | 3 | 3:00 |
| 2017-05-12 | Win | (Belarus) Liudmila Chyslova | 2017 IFMA World Championship, Final | Minsk, Belarus | Decision | 3 | 3:00 |
Wins 2017 IFMA World Championship -48kg Gold Medal.
| 2017-05-08 | Win | (Morocco) Meriame Mahfoud | 2017 IFMA World Championship, Semi Final | Minsk, Belarus | Decision | 3 | 3:00 |
| 2017-05-07 | Win | (Russia) Vera Buga | 2017 IFMA World Championship, Quarter Final | Minsk, Belarus | Decision | 3 | 3:00 |
| 2016-09- | Win | (Hong Kong) Wu Hoi Yan | 2016 Asian Beach Games, Final | Da Nang, Vietnam | Decision | 3 | 3:00 |
Wins 2016 Asian Beach Games Muay Thai -48kg Gold Medal.
| 2016-09- | Win | | 2016 Asian Beach Games, Semi Final | Da Nang, Vietnam | Decision | 3 | 3:00 |
| 2016-05-28 | Loss | (Belarus) Alena Liashkevich | 2016 IFMA World Championship, Final | Jönköping, Sweden | Decision | 3 | 3:00 |
Wins 2016 IFMA World Championship -45kg Silver Medal.
| 2016-05-26 | Win | (Russia) Vera Megodina | 2016 IFMA World Championship, Semi Final | Jönköping, Sweden | Decision | 3 | 3:00 |
| 2015-08-20 | Win | (Belarus) Alena Liashkevich | 2015 IFMA World Championship, Final | Bangkok, Thailand | Decision | 3 | 3:00 |
Wins 2015 IFMA World Championship -45kg Gold Medal.
| 2015-08-19 | Win | (Finland) Pia Urpulahti | 2015 IFMA World Championship, Semi Final | Bangkok, Thailand | Decision | 3 | 3:00 |
| 2015-08-16 | Win | (Hong Kong) Wu Hoi Yan | 2015 IFMA World Championship, Quarter Final | Bangkok, Thailand | Decision | 3 | 3:00 |
Legend: Win Loss Draw/No contest Notes

== Professional boxing record ==
| 7 fights | 6 wins | 1 loss |
|---|---|---|
| By decision | 6 | 1 |

| No. | Result | Record | Opponent | Type | Round, time | Date | Location | Notes |
|---|---|---|---|---|---|---|---|---|
| 7 | Win | 6–1 | (Thailand) Superball Paradorngym | PTS | 6 | 12 Jun 2015 | Lam Luk Ka, Thailand | |
| 6 | Win | 5–1 | (Thailand) Nongmew Sor Pornchai | PTS | 6 | 18 Apr 2015 | Pattaya Boxing World, Pattaya, Thailand | |
| 5 | Win | 4–1 | (Laos) Sroithong Kwanjaisrikot | PTS | 6 | 18 Mar 2015 | Wang Noi, Thailand | |
| 4 | Win | 3–1 | (Laos) Namnung Kwanjaisrikot | PTS | 6 | 8 Nov 2014 | Nakhon Ratchasima, Thailand | |
| 3 | Win | 2–1 | (Laos) Lamnammoon Kwanjaisrikort | UD | 6 | 3 Oct 2014 | Ban Rai Temple, Nakhon Ratchasima, Thailand | |
| 2 | Loss | 1–1 | (Laos) Myna Ketsana | UD | 10 | 8 Aug 2014 | Sawan Vegas Hotel, Savannakhet, Laos | For vacant WBC Asia female light-flyweight title. |
| 1 | Win | 1–0 | (Thailand) Nongple Sor Sakuljeor | PTS | 6 | 10 Jul 2014 | Pak Kret Pier, Pak Kret, Thailand | |

== See also ==
- List of current UFC fighters
- List of female mixed martial artists
