= Nong Khon Kwang railway station =

Railway station in Nong Khon Kwang, Thailand

Nong Khon Kwang หนองขอนกว้าง

General information
- Location: Nong Khon Kwang Subdistrict, Mueang Udon Thani District; Udon Thani Province; Thailand
- Coordinates: 17°22′31″N 102°48′47″E
- Operator: State Railway of Thailand
- Line: Nong Khai Main Line
- Platforms: 1
- Tracks: 4

Construction
- Structure type: At-grade

Other information
- Station code: ออ.
- Classification: Class 3

Services
Preceding station	State Railway of Thailand	Following station
Kham Kling Halt towards Hua Lamphong or Krung Thep Aphiwat	Northeastern Line	Udon Thani towards Khamsavath (Laos)
Location

Nong Khon Kwang railway station is a railway station located in Nong Khon Kwang Subdistrict, Mueang Udon Thani District, Udon Thani Province. It is a class 3 railway station located 565.40 km (351.3 mi) from Bangkok railway station.
