= Ban Phai railway station =

Railway station in Thailand

Ban Phai บ้านไผ่
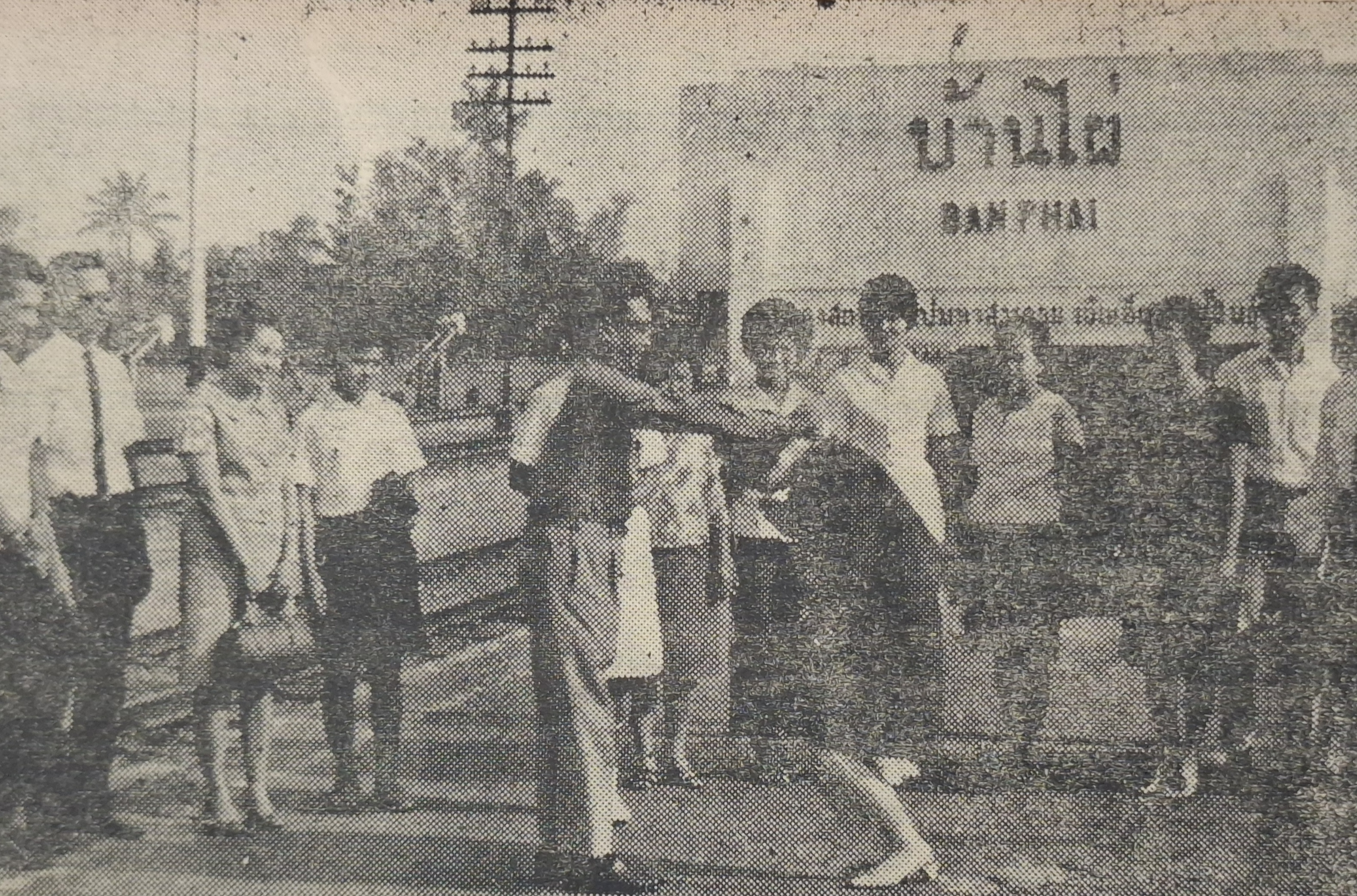
- Ban phai railway station on 1968

General information
- Location: Nai Mueang Subdistrict, Ban Phai District; Khon Kaen Province; Thailand
- Coordinates: 16.0595°N 102.7254°E
- Operator: State Railway of Thailand
- Line: Nong Khai Main Line
- Platforms: 4
- Tracks: 4

Construction
- Structure type: Elevated

Other information
- Station code: บผ.
- Classification: Class 1

History
- Rebuilt: 14 February 2019

Services
Preceding station	State Railway of Thailand	Following station
Ban Han towards Hua Lamphong or Krung Thep Aphiwat	Northeastern Line	Ban Haet towards Khamsavath (Laos)
Location

Ban Phai station (Thai: สถานีบ้านไผ่) is a railway station located in Nai Mueang Subdistrict, Ban Phai District, Khon Kaen. It is a class 1 railway station located 407.723 km (253.3 mi) from Bangkok railway station. It was originally a ground-level station and it was refurbished and reopened as an elevated station on 14 February 2019.
