= Nong Khai railway station =

Railway station in Mi Chai, Thailand

Coordinates: 17.8646°N 102.7311°E

Nong Khai หนองคาย
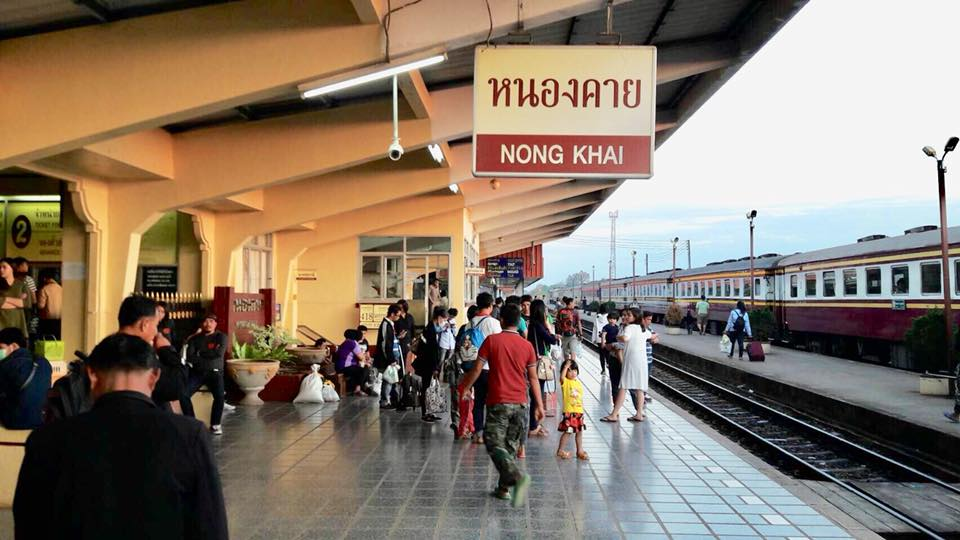

General information
- Location: Mi Chai Sub-district, Mueang Nong Khai District; Nong Khai Province; Thailand
- Operator: State Railway of Thailand
- Manager: Ministry of Transport
- Line: Nong Khai Main Line
- Platforms: 2
- Tracks: 6
- Connections: Local transportation

Construction
- Structure type: At-grade
- Parking: Yes

Other information
- Station code: นค
- Classification: Class 1

History
- Opened: May 2000
- Former names: Nong Khai Mai

Services
Preceding station	State Railway of Thailand	Following station
Na Tha towards Hua Lamphong or Krung Thep Aphiwat	Northeastern Line	Thanaleng (Laos) towards Khamsavath (Laos)
Location

Nong Khai railway station is a railway station located in Mi Chai Sub-district, Mueang Nong Khai District, Nong Khai Province. It is a class 1 railway station located 623.58 km (387.5 mi) from Bangkok railway station.

== History ==
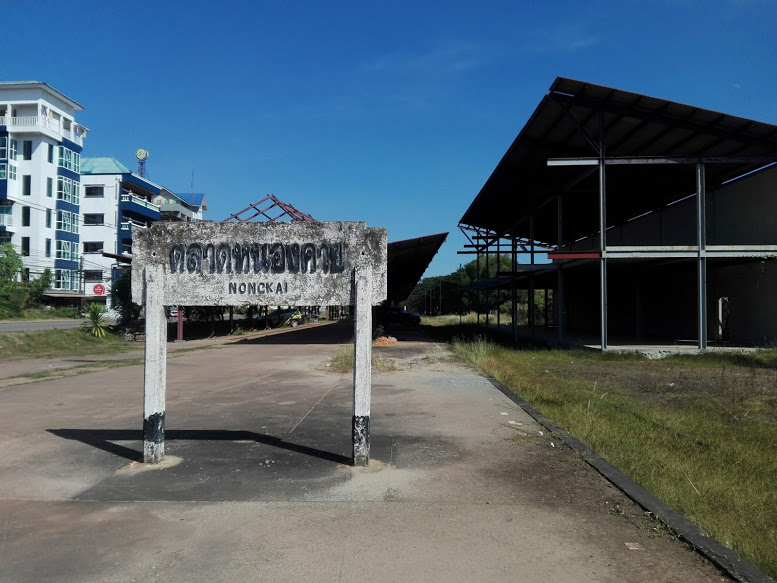
Former Talat Nong Khai railway station

Originally, Nong Khai railway station opened at the location of the present-day Na Tha railway station as part of the Northeastern Line Udon Thani–Na Tha section on September 13, 1955. In July 1958, the line extended to near the Mekong River and the terminus station there was then the Nong Khai railway station, and the old was renamed Na Tha railway station. The station by the river acted as "Nong Khai" railway station for about 42 years, until the newer and present-day opened in May 2000 as Nong Khai railway station before Nong Khai Mai railway station. The station by the river was renamed to "Talat Nong Khai" and closed down in 2008.

On March 5, 2009, the Northeastern Line extended to Thanaleng in Laos across the First Thai–Lao Friendship Bridge, and international services between the present-day Nong Khai station and Thanaleng station began.

The metre gauge railway was extended to Khamsavath railway station several kilometres northwest of Thanaleng station and is located just 4 km from the centre of Vientiane. Freight transport by train between Nong Khai and Laos were increased to 24 round trips a day over the next five years, with each service consisting of 25 carriages, to handle growing cargo traffic from the rail link from standard gauge Boten–Vientiane railway, which opened in December 2021.

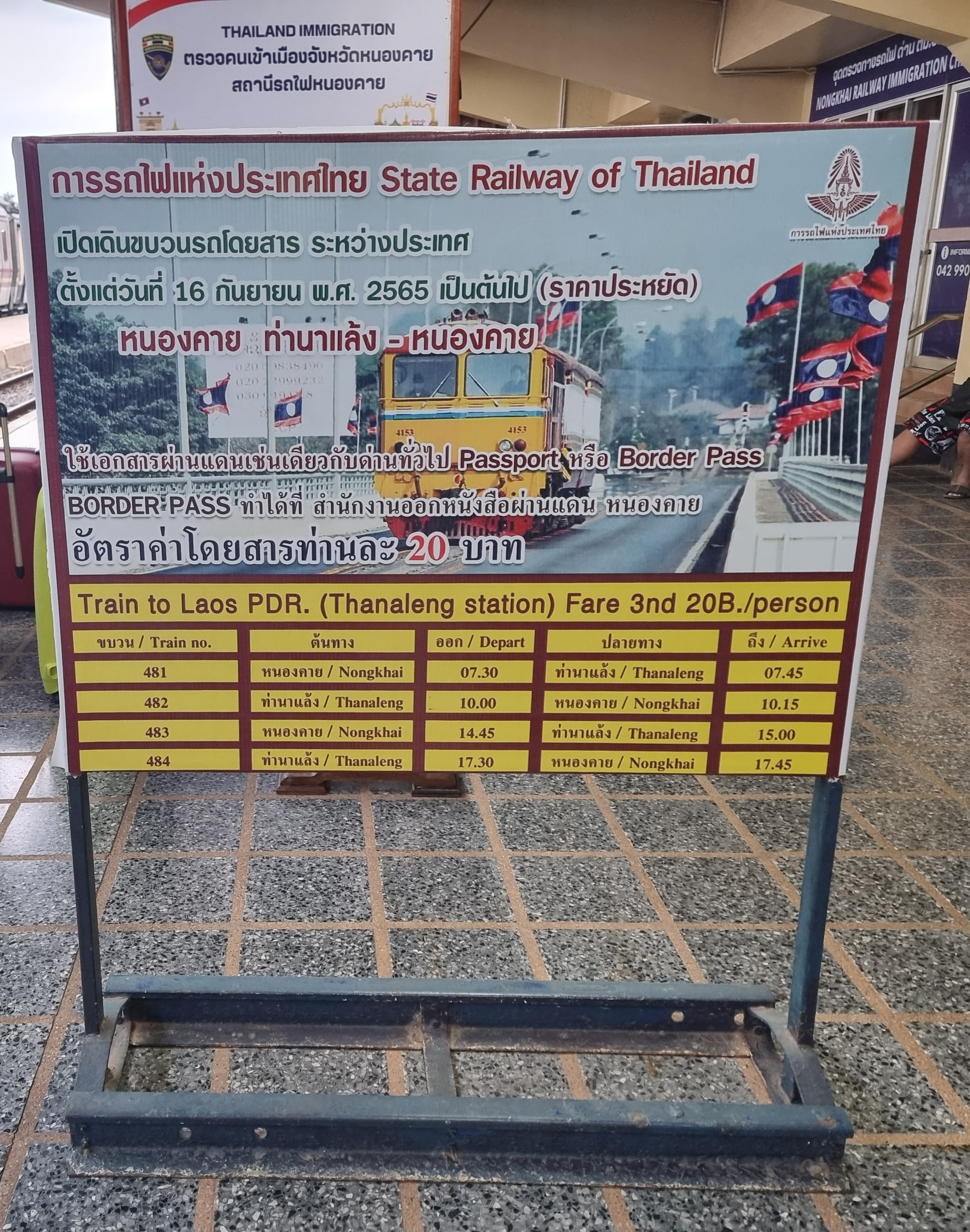
Information about the cross-border shuttle posted on the Thai side of the border

== Train services ==
As of 19 July 2024, 10 trains serve Nong Khai railway station.

=== Northbound ===
Train No.	Type	Origin		Nong Khai	Terminus		Notes
Train No.	Type	Station	Depart	Nong Khai	Station	Arrive	Notes
415	Local	Nakhon Ratchasima	06:20	Terminus	Nong Khai	12:05	
75	Express diesel railcar	Krung Thep Aphiwat	08:20	Terminus	Nong Khai	17:30	
25	Special Express "Isan Makkha"	Krung Thep Aphiwat	20:00	Terminus	Nong Khai	06:25	
133	Rapid	Krung Thep Aphiwat	21:25	07:55	Vientiane (Khamsavath)	09:05	
147	Rapid	Udon Thani	16:00	16:40	Vientiane (Khamsavath)	17:55	

=== Southbound ===
Train No.	Type	Origin		Nong Khai	Terminus		Notes
Train No.	Type	Station	Depart	Nong Khai	Station	Arrive	Notes
76	Express diesel railcar	Nong Khai	07:45	Origin	Krung Thep Aphiwat	17:10	
418	Local	Nong Khai	12:55	Origin	Nakhon Ratchasima	18:35	
134	Rapid	Vientiane (Khamsavath)	18:20	20:15	Krung Thep Aphiwat	07:30	
26	Special Express "Isan Makkha"	Nong Khai	19:40	Origin	Krung Thep Aphiwat	06:00	
148	Rapid	Vientiane (Khamsavath)	9:35	10:05	Udon Thani	11:25	
