= Samran railway station =

Railway station in Thailand

Samran สำราญ

General information
- Location: Sila Subdistrict, Mueang Khon Kaen District; Khon Kaen Province; Thailand
- Coordinates: 16°31′02″N 102°50′35″E
- Operator: State Railway of Thailand
- Manager: Ministry of Transport
- Line: Nong Khai Main Line
- Distance: 460.71 km (286.3 mi) from Bangkok
- Platforms: 1
- Tracks: 3

Construction
- Structure type: At-grade

Other information
- Station code: าญ.
- Classification: Class 3

Services
| Preceding station | State Railway of Thailand | Following station |
|---|---|---|
| Khon Kaen towards Hua Lamphong or Krung Thep Aphiwat | Northeastern Line | Non Phayom towards Khamsavath (Laos) |
Location

Samran railway station is a railway station located in Sila Subdistrict, Mueang Khon Kaen District, Khon Kaen Province. It is a class 3 railway station located 460.71 km (286.3 mi) from Bangkok railway station. It is the location of PTT's LPG Khon Kaen Depot.
