= Na Phu railway station =

Railway station in Thailand

Na Phu นาพู่

General information
- Location: Na Phu Subdistrict, Phen District; Udon Thani Province; Thailand
- Coordinates: 17°37′11″N 102°46′22″E
- Operator: State Railway of Thailand
- Line: Nong Khai Main Line
- Platforms: 1
- Tracks: 2

Construction
- Structure type: At-grade

Other information
- Station code: ภู.
- Classification: Class 3

History
- Opened: 16 March 2015 (new station)
- Closed: mid-1980s (original)

Services
Preceding station	State Railway of Thailand	Following station
Udon Thani towards Hua Lamphong or Krung Thep Aphiwat	Northeastern Line	Na Tha towards Khamsavath (Laos)
Location

Na Phu railway station is a railway station located in Na Phu Subdistrict, Phen District, Udon Thani Province. It is a class 3 railway station located 593.00 km (368.5 mi) from Bangkok railway station. Na Phu was originally a railway station built a long time ago, but it was closed down in the 1980s. The station was rebuilt and reopened on 16 March 2015.
