= Tha Phra railway station =

Railway station in Khon Kaen Province, Thailand

Tha Phra ท่าพระ

General information
- Location: Tha Phra Subdistrict, Mueang Khon Kaen District; Khon Kaen Province; Thailand
- Coordinates: 16°20′19″N 102°48′15″E
- Operator: State Railway of Thailand
- Line: Nong Khai Main Line
- Platforms: 2
- Tracks: 5

Construction
- Structure type: At-grade

Other information
- Station code: พะ.
- Classification: Class 3

History
- Rebuilt: 2019

Services
Preceding station	State Railway of Thailand	Following station
Ban Haet towards Hua Lamphong or Krung Thep Aphiwat	Northeastern Line	Khon Kaen towards Khamsavath (Laos)
Location

Tha Phra railway station is a railway station located in Tha Phra Subdistrict, Mueang Khon Kaen District, Khon Kaen Province. It is a class 3 railway station located 439.81 km (273.3 mi) from Hua Lamphong railway station. The station was rebuilt in 2019 as part of the double tracking project between Thanon Chira Junction and Khon Kaen.
