= Na Tha railway station =

Railway station in Thailand

Na Tha นาทา
- Station in 2026

General information
- Location: Nong Kom Ko Subdistrict, Mueang Nong Khai District; Nong Khai Province; Thailand
- Coordinates: 17°50′31″N 102°44′54″E
- Operator: State Railway of Thailand
- Line: Nong Khai Main Line
- Platforms: 2
- Tracks: 6

Construction
- Structure type: At-grade

Other information
- Station code: ยน.
- Classification: Class 3

History
- Opened: 23 September 1955
- Former names: Nong Khai (until July 1958)

Services
| Preceding station | State Railway of Thailand | Following station |
|---|---|---|
| Na Phu towards Hua Lamphong or Krung Thep Aphiwat | Northeastern Line | Nong Khai towards Khamsavath (Laos) |
Location

Na Tha railway station is a railway station located in Nong Kom Ko Subdistrict, Mueang Nong Khai District, Nong Khai Province. It is a class 3 railway station located 617.84 km (383.9 mi) from Bangkok railway station. The station is opened on 23 September 1955 as part of opening section of Udon Thani–Nong Khai

Na Tha was originally known as Nong Khai, and served as the main railway station for Nong Khai Province until the extension to the new Nong Khai railway station near Mekong river was built and open in July 1958. The first Nong Khai station was later renamed to Na Tha.

The station by the river acted as "Nong Khai" railway station for about 42 years, until the newer and present-day opened in May 2000 as Nong Khai railway station before Nong Khai Mai railway station. The station by the river was renamed to "Talat Nong Khai" and closed in 2008.

== Train services ==
- Ordinary No. 415/418 Nakhon Ratchasima–Nong Khai
