= Non Phayom railway station =

Railway station in Thailand

Non Phayom โนนพยอม

General information
- Location: Muang Wan Subdistrict, Nam Phong District; Khon Kaen Province; Thailand
- Coordinates: 16°38′36″N 102°49′07″E
- Operator: State Railway of Thailand
- Manager: Ministry of Transport
- Line: Nong Khai Main Line
- Distance: 474.93 km (295.1 mi) from Bangkok
- Platforms: 1
- Tracks: 6

Construction
- Structure type: At-grade

Other information
- Station code: พอ.
- Classification: Class 3

Services
Preceding station	State Railway of Thailand	Following station
Samran towards Hua Lamphong or Krung Thep Aphiwat	Northeastern Line	Ban Wang Chai Halt towards Khamsavath (Laos)
Location

Non Phayom railway station is a railway station located in Muang Wan Subdistrict, Nam Phong District, Khon Kaen Province. It is a class 3 railway station located 474.93 km (295.1 mi) from Bangkok railway station.
