= Udon Thani railway station =

Railway station in Thailand

Coordinates: 17.4042°N 102.8055°E

Udon Thani อุดรธานี
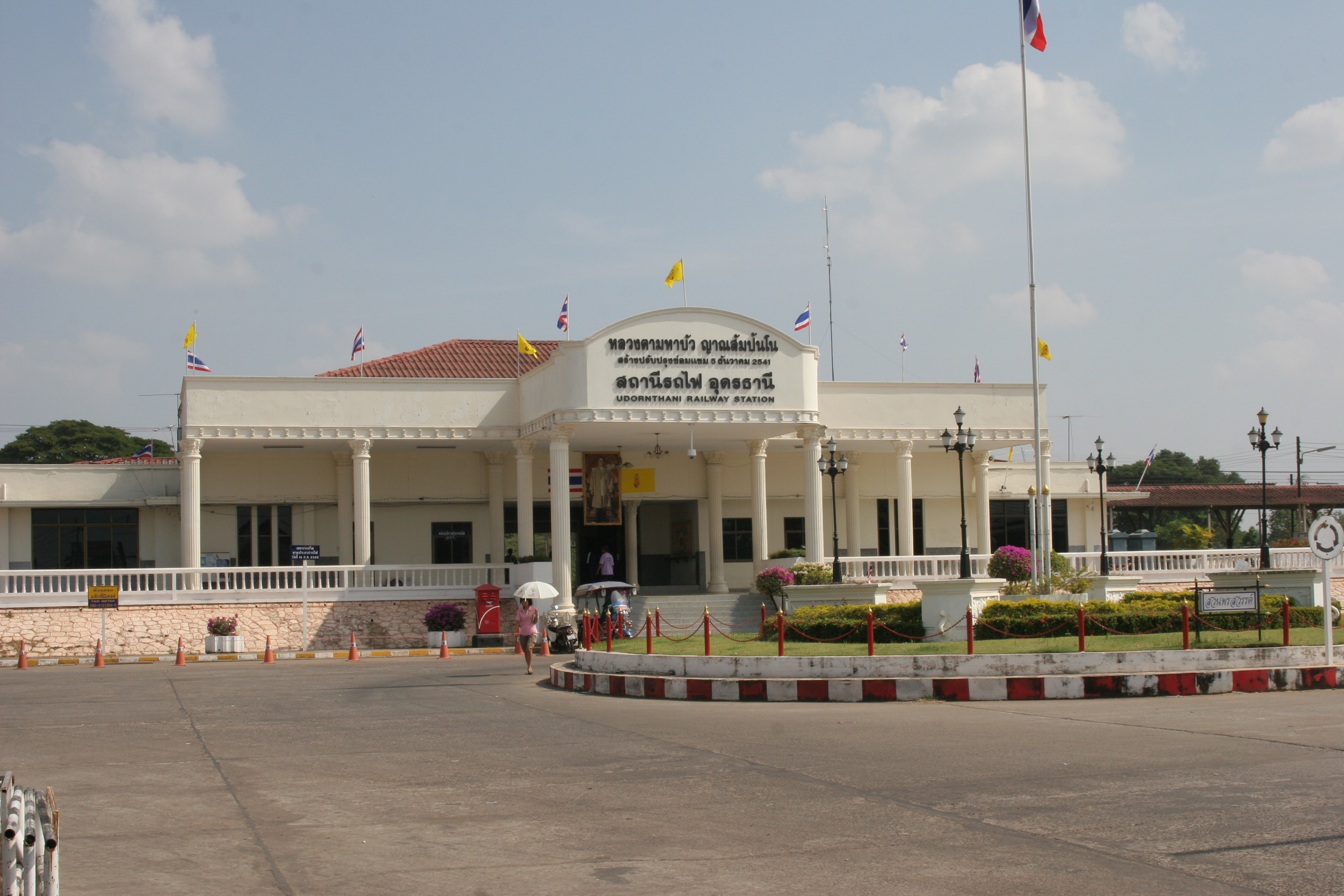

General information
- Location: Mak Khaeng Sub-district, Mueang Udon Thani District; Udon Thani Province; Thailand
- Operator: State Railway of Thailand
- Line: Nong Khai Main Line
- Platforms: 3
- Tracks: 7
- Connections: Local transportation

Construction
- Structure type: At-grade
- Parking: Yes
- Cycle facilities: Yes

Other information
- Station code: รด.
- Classification: Class 1

History
- Opened: 24 June 1941

Services
Preceding station	State Railway of Thailand	Following station
Nong Khon Kwang towards Hua Lamphong or Krung Thep Aphiwat	Northeastern Line	Na Phu towards Khamsavath (Laos)
Location

Udon Thani railway station is a railway station located in Mak Khaeng Sub-district, Mueang Udon Thani district, Udon Thani province. It is a class 1 railway station located 568.843 km (353.5 mi) from Bangkok railway station. It is the main railway station of Udon Thai province.

== History ==
The station opened on June 24, 1941, as part of the Northeastern Line Khon Kaen–Udon Thani section. In September 1955, the line extended to Na Tha railway station (at the time Nong Khai main station).
