= Thanyaburi Town =

Coordinates: 14°01′N 100°45′E

Thanyaburi is a municipality in central Thailand, in Pathum Thani Province, about 40 km north of Bangkok. Recent population estimates cited on the Internet range between 113,825 and 118,773.
