= Khon Kaen railway station =

Railway station in Nai Mueang, Thailand

Khon Kaen ขอนแก่น
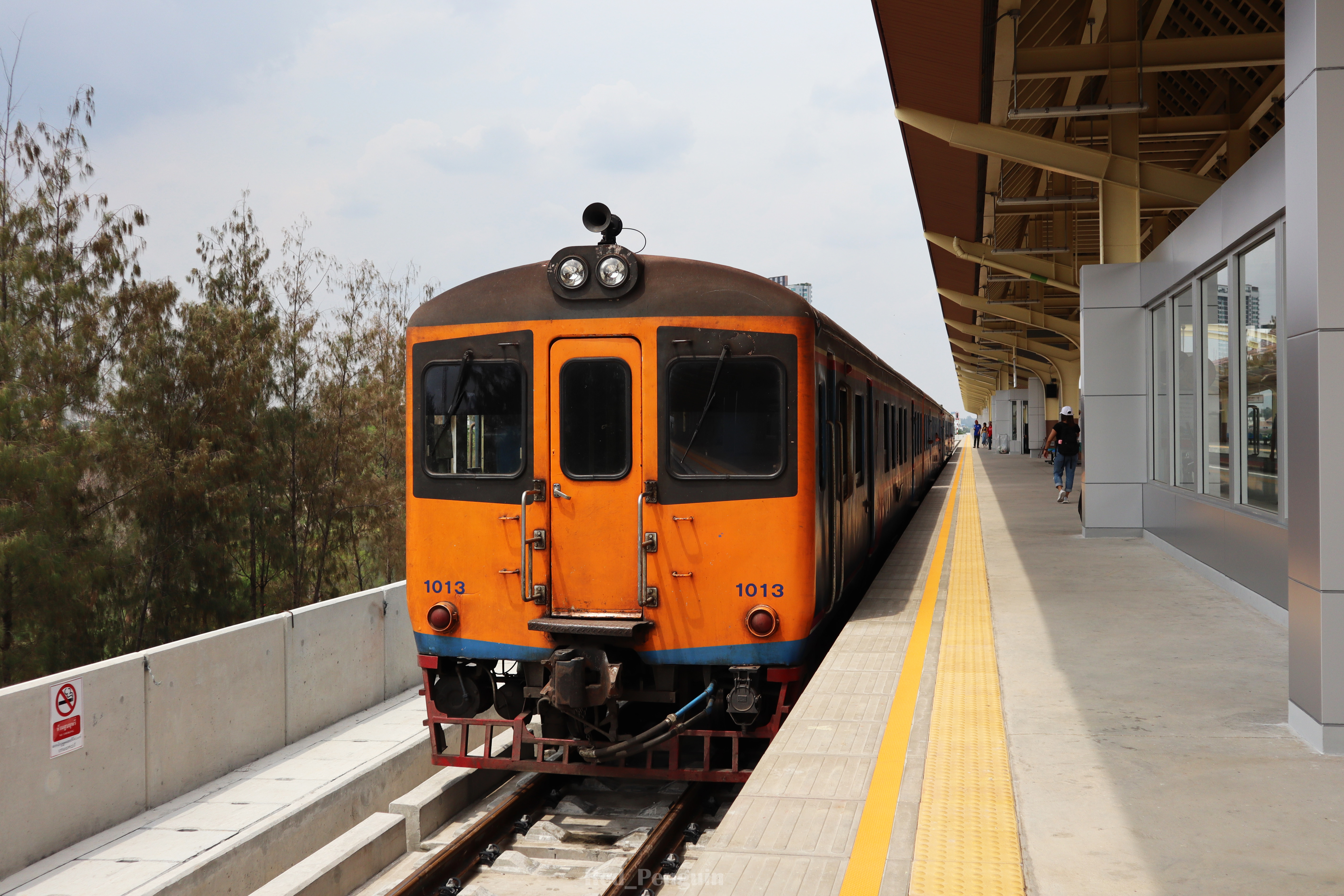
- RHN1013, Local Train no.432 Train stopping at Khon Kaen in 2019

General information
- Location: Nai Mueang Subdistrict, Mueang Khon Kaen District; Khon Kaen Province; Thailand
- Coordinates: 16.4268°N 102.8256°E
- Operator: State Railway of Thailand
- Manager: Ministry of Transport
- Line: Nong Khai Main Line
- Platforms: 4
- Tracks: 4

Construction
- Structure type: Elevated
- Parking: Yes

Other information
- Station code: ขอ.
- Classification: Class 1

History
- Opened: 1 April 1933
- Rebuilt: 2019

Services
Preceding station	State Railway of Thailand	Following station
Tha Phra towards Hua Lamphong or Krung Thep Aphiwat	Northeastern Line	Samran towards Khamsavath (Laos)
Location

Khon Kaen railway station is a railway station located in Nai Mueang Subdistrict, Khon Kaen City, Khon Kaen. It is a class 1 railway station located 449.752 km (279.5 mi) from Bangkok railway station. The station opened on April 1, 1933, as part of the Northeastern Line Nakhon Ratchasima–Khon Kaen section. On June 24, 1941, the line extended to Udon Thani. The station was rebuilt as the first elevated station of Northeastern region in 2019, with the Thanon Chira Junction–Khon Kaen double-track railway project.

== Train services ==
As of November 2021, 6 trains serve Khon Kaen railway station.

=== Outbound ===
Train	Departaure		Khon Kaen	Destination		Notes
Train	Station	Depart	Khon Kaen	Station	Arrive	Notes
Local 415	Nakhon Ratchasima	06:20	09:27	Nong Khai	12:05	
Express 75	Krung Thep Aphiwat	08:45	15:30	Nong Khai	17:30	
Special Express "Isan Makkha" 25	Krung Thep Aphiwat	20.25	04.10	Nong Khai	06.45	
Rapid 133	Krung Thep Aphiwat	21.25	05:19	Nong Khai	07:55	

=== Inbound ===
Train	Departaure		Khon Kaen	Destination		Notes
Train	Station	Depart	Khon Kaen	Station	Arrive	Notes
Express 76	Nong Khai	07:45	09:29	Krung Thep Aphiwat	16.45	
Local 418	Nong Khai	12:55	15:27	Nakhon Ratchasima	18:35	
Rapid 134	Nong Khai	18:00	21:10	Krung Thep Aphiwat	05:30	
Special Express "Isan Makkha" 26	Nong Khai	19.40	21.47	Krung Thep Aphiwat	04.50	

== Gallery ==
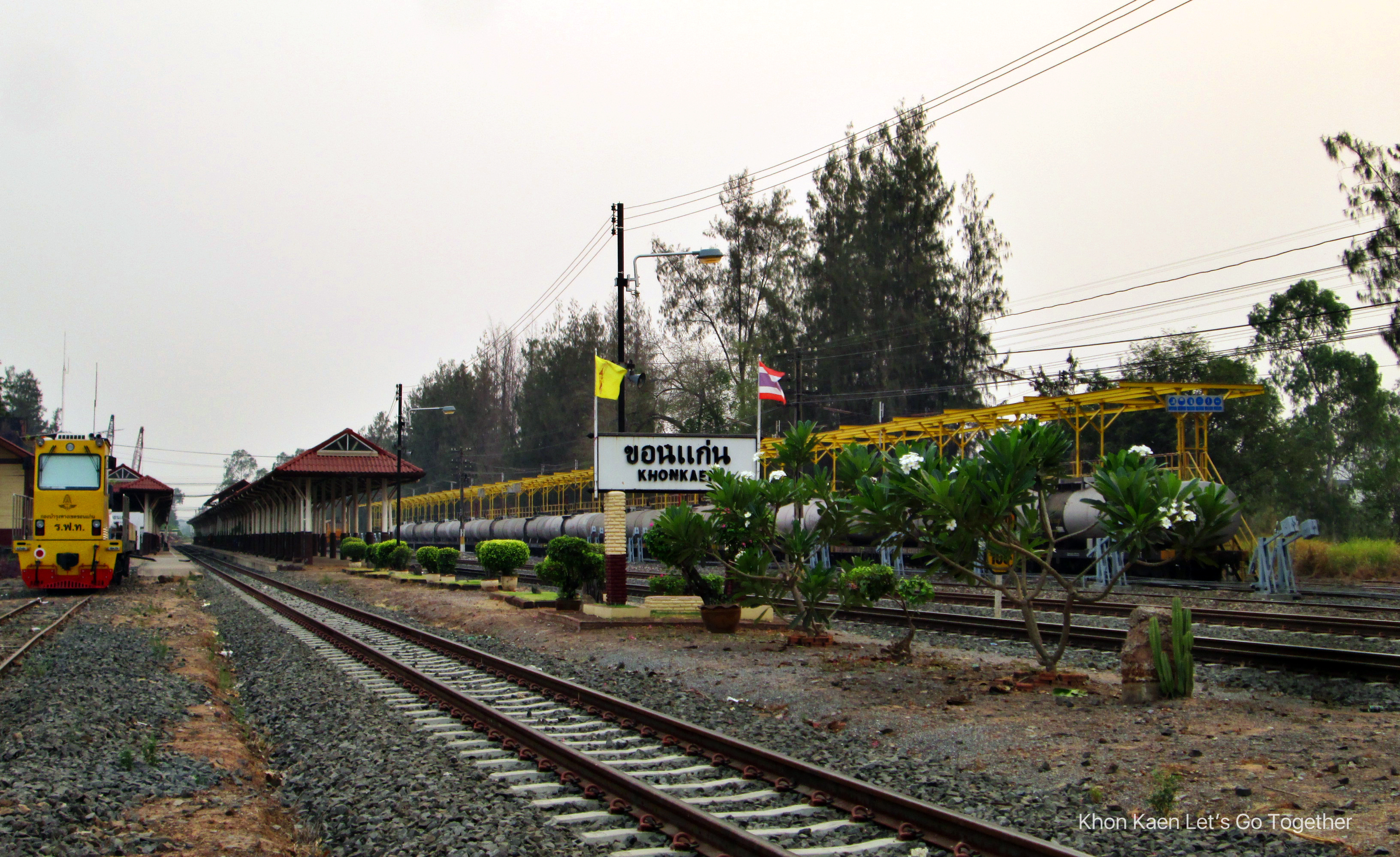
Signage before refurbishment

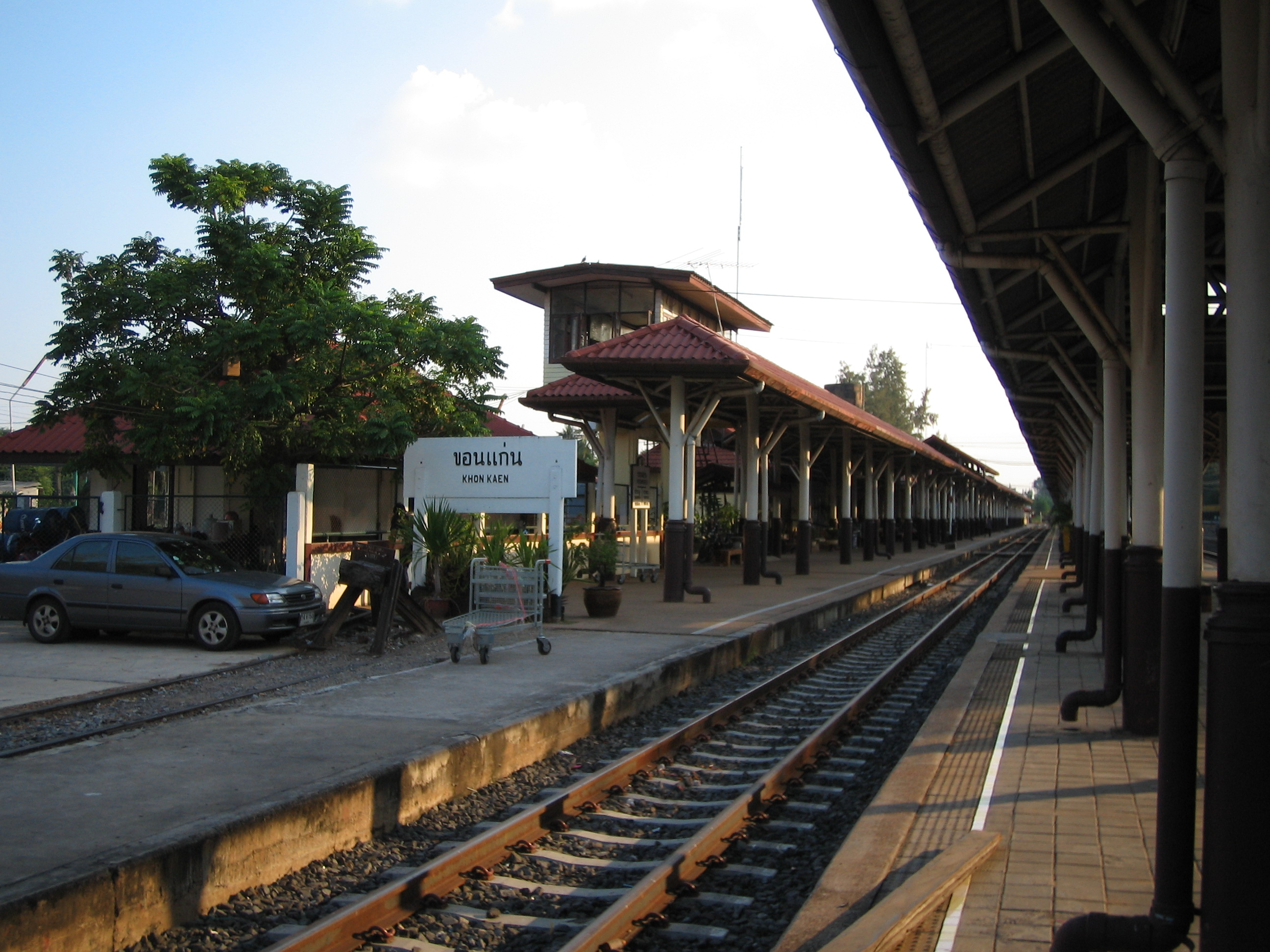
Structure before refurbishment

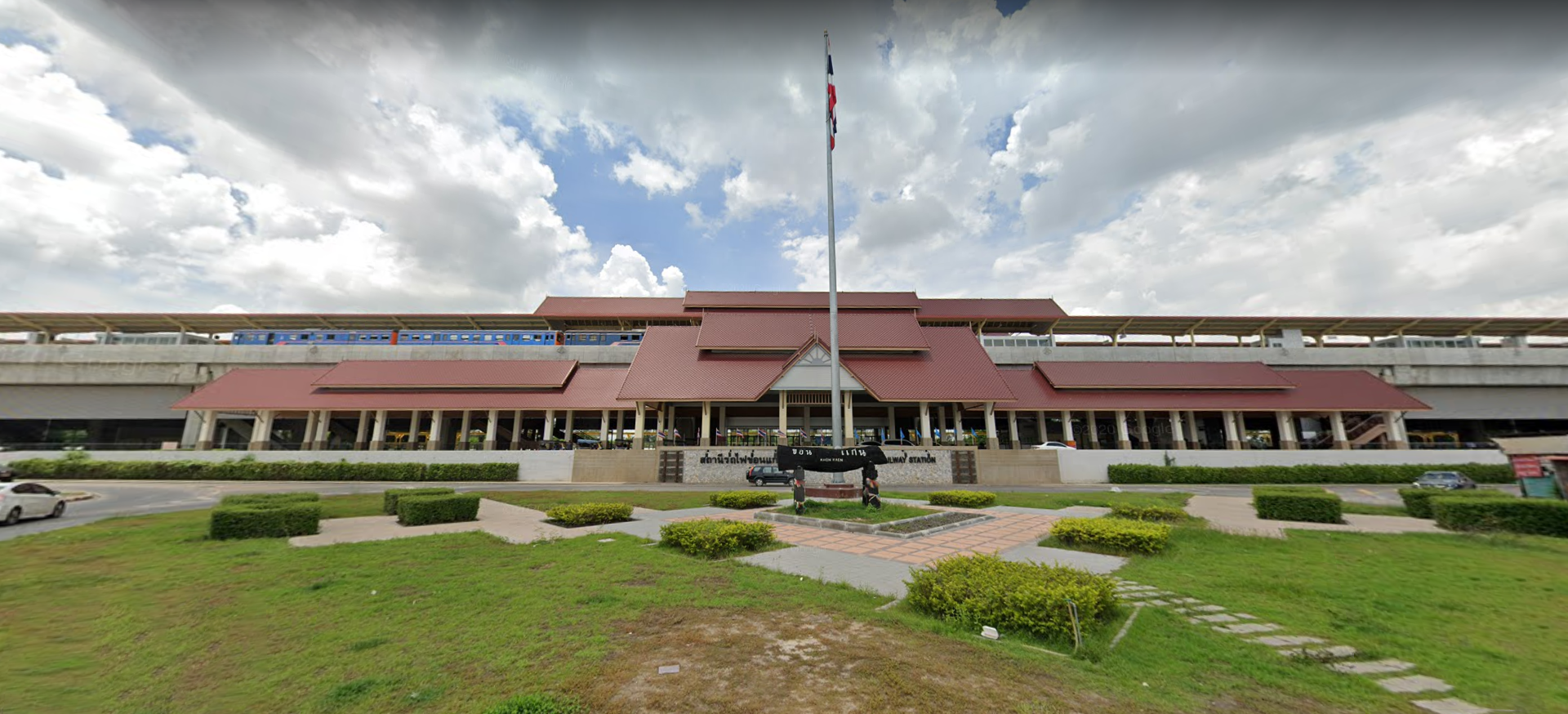
Station after refurbishment

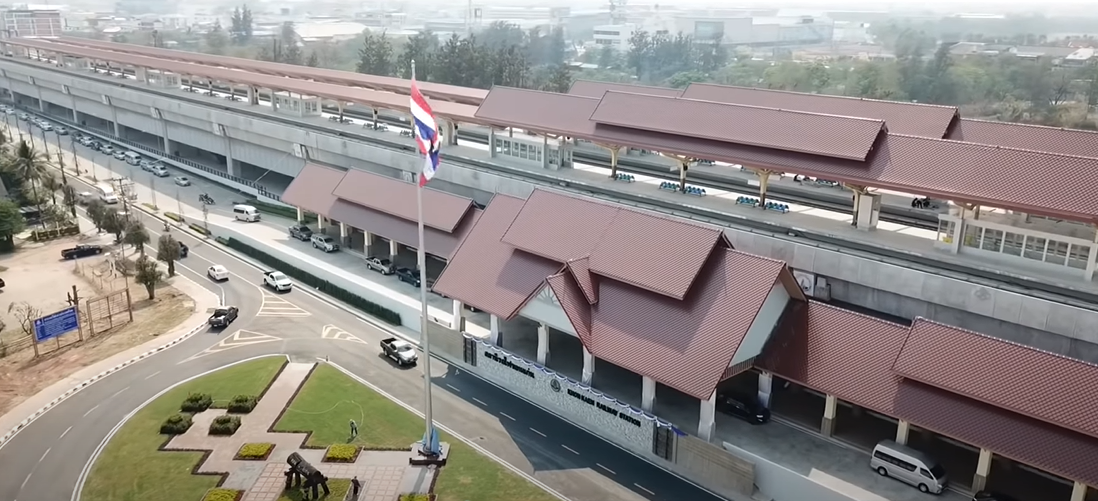
Aerial view after refurbishment
