= List of tributaries of the Chao Phraya River =

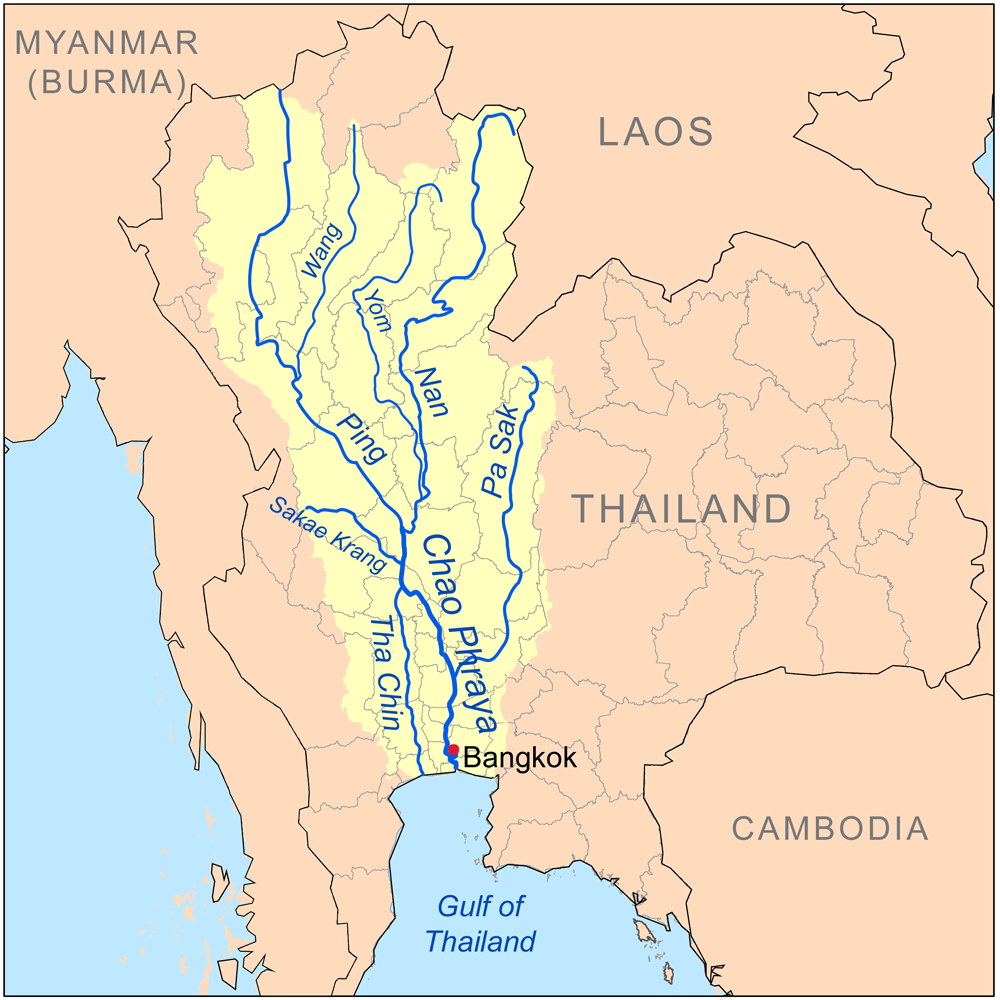
Map of the Chao Phraya River drainage basin

The principal tributaries of the Chao Phraya River of Thailand are the Pa Sak River, the Sakae Krang River, the Nan River (along with its principal confluent the Yom River), the Ping River (with its principal confluent the Wang River), and the Tha Chin River. Each of these tributaries (and the Chao Phraya itself) is further tributed by additional minor tributaries often referred to as khwae. All of the tributaries, including the lesser khwae, form an extensive tree-like pattern, with branches flowing through nearly every province in central and northern Thailand. None of the tributaries of the Chao Phraya extend beyond the nation's borders. The Nan and the Yom River flow nearly parallel from Phitsanulok to Chumsaeng in the north of Nakhon Sawan province. The Wang River enters the Ping River near Sam Ngao district in Tak province.

== Tributary tree ==
The following is a tree demonstrating the points at which the major tributaries of the Chao Phraya River branch off from the main river and from each other.

- Gulf of Thailand
  - Chao Phraya River (Drains into the Gulf of Thailand via the Chao Phraya Delta)
    - Noi River (Joins the Chao Phraya at Bang Sai)
    - Pa Sak River (Joins the Lopburi at Ayutthaya Island)
      - Lopburi River (Joins the Pa Sak at Ayutthaya)
      - Additional tributaries of the Pa Sak include the Muak Lek, Phung, Pa Daeng, Kong, Sonthi, Wang Chomphu, Na, Chun, Duk, Khon Kaen, Yai, Saduang Yai, Ban Bong, Tarang and Phaya Klang Rivers.
    - Sakae Krang River (Joins the Chao Phraya at Uthai Thani)
      - Tributaries of the Sakae Krang River include Huai Thap Salao and Khlong Pho.
    - Nan River (Joins the Chao Phraya at Nakhon Sawan)
      - Yom River (Joins the Nan within Amphoe Chum Saeng in the Nakhon Sawan Province)
        - Tributaries of the Yom include Pong, Ngao, Ngim, Sin, Suat, Pi, Mok, Phuak, Ramphan, Lai, Khuan and Kam Mi Rivers
      - Butsabong River
      - Wang Pong River
      - Tha Luang River (Joins the Nan at 16°26′27″N 100°21′21″E in Phichit)
        - Wat Ta Yom River
          - Tha Muen Ram River
            - Chomphu River
      - Wang Thong River (Joins the Nan at 16°31′06″N 100°19′36″E within Phichit Province)
      - Khwae Noi River (Joins the Nan within Chom Thong, Amphoe Mueang Phitsanulok in the Phitsanulok Province)
        - Om Sing River
          - Fua River
        - Phak River
      - Tron River (Joins the Nan within Uttaradit Province)
      - Pat River (Joins the Nan within Uttaradit Province)
        - Phai River
      - Wa River (Joins the Nan within Nan Province)
      - Haet River
      - Yao River
      - Hao River (Joins the Nan at Ban A Ham within Nan Province)
        - Yang River
        - Bua River
      - Khun River
      - Pua River
      - Yao River (2)
      - Additional tributaries of the Nan include the Than, Khan, Khlung, Haeng River, Fia, Kaem, Kap, Kleung, Bang Kaeo, Grung Grak, Ban Mung, and Sai Yoi Rivers, although the Royal Irrigation Department report provides insufficient data to link them to tributary tree.
    - Ping River (Joins the Chao Phraya at Nakhon Sawan)
      - Khlung River (2)
      - Suan Mak River (Joins the Ping at 16°29′42″N 99°29′56″E)
      - Wang Chao River (Joins the Ping at 16°41′02″N 99°16′16″E)
      - Pra Dang River (Joins the Ping at 16°44′46″N 99°13′05″E)
      - Raka River (Placement in tributary tree is approximate, geographical coordinates unavailable due to poor satellite resolution)
      - Wang River (Joins the Ping at 17°07′25″N 99°03′35″E in the town of Tak)
        - Tributaries include Mo, Tui, Chang & Soi Rivers
      - Tak River (Joins the Ping at 17°02′18″N 99°04′00″E)
      - Ko River (Joins the Ping at 17°41′17″N 98°45′01″E)
      - Tun River (Placement in tributary tree is approximate, geographical coordinates unavailable due to poor satellite resolution)
      - Pa River
      - Chaem River (Joins the Ping at 18°11′19″N 98°38′02″E)
      - Klang River (Joins the Ping at 18°22′12″N 98°40′55″E)
      - Li River (Joins the Ping at 18°25′43″N 98°42′08″E)
      - Tun River (2) (Placement in tributary tree is approximate, geographical coordinates unavailable due to poor satellite resolution)
      - Khan River (2) (Joins the Ping at 18°30′05″N 98°51′04″E)
        - Wang River (2) (Joins the Khan at 18°32′58″N 98°51′37″E)
      - Kuang River (Joins the Ping at 18°32′33″N 98°56′07″E)
        - Tha River (Joins Kuang at 18°32′23″N 98°56′29″E)
          - Sapuat River (Placement in tributary tree is approximate, geographical coordinates unavailable due to inaccurate station data from Royal Irrigation Department)
      - Khanat River (Placement in tributary tree is approximate, geographical coordinates unavailable due to poor satellite resolution)
      - San River (Placement in tributary tree is approximate, geographical coordinates presently undeterminable due to recently built dam)
      - Tip River (Placement in tributary tree is approximate, geographical coordinates presently undeterminable due to recently built dam)
      - Phaem River (Placement in tributary tree is approximate, geographical coordinates unavailable due to poor satellite resolution)
      - Mempin River (Placement in tributary tree is approximate, geographical coordinates unavailable due to poor satellite resolution)
      - Lai River (2) (Placement in tributary tree is approximate, geographical coordinates unavailable due to poor satellite resolution)
      - Sa River (Joins the Ping at 18°53′28″N 98°58′22″E)
      - Rim River (Joins the Ping at 18°55′13″N 98°58′02″E)
      - Nai River (Placement in tributary tree is approximate, geographical coordinates unavailable due to poor satellite resolution)
      - Taeng River (Joins the Ping at 19°06′08″N 98°56′49″E)
      - Ngat River (Joins the Ping at 19°09′11″N 99°00′44″E)
    - Additional tributaries of the Chao Phraya include the Wang River (3), the Yai River (2), the Bang Kaeo River, and the Khun Kaeo River.
  - Tha Chin River
    - Tributaries of the Tha Chin include the Kra Sieo, Yang, Tawip, Chorakhe Sam, Bang Len and Chin Si Rivers.

Rivers marked with a number in parentheses indicate multiple rivers in this system bearing the same name in English.
