= Bang Rakam =

Bang Rakam may refer to:

- Bang Rakam District
- Bang Rakam Subdistrict
