= Chum Saeng Songkhram =

Chum Saeng Songkhram ชุมแสงสงคราม
- Tambon
- Interactive map of Chum Saeng Songkhram
- Coordinates: 16°50′00″N 100°04′00″E
- Country: Thailand
- Province: Phitsanulok
- District: Bang Rakam

Population (2005)
  - Total: 8,026
- Time zone: UTC+7 (ICT)
- Postal code: 65240
- Geocode: 650407

Chum Saeng Songkhram (Thai: ชุมแสงสงคราม) is a subdistrict in the Bang Rakam District of Phitsanulok Province, Thailand.

== Geography ==
Chum Saeng Songkhram lies in the Yom Basin, which is part of the Chao Phraya Watershed.

== Administration ==
The following is a list of the subdistrict's muban (villages):

No.	English	Thai
1	Ban Bang Ba	บ้านบางบ้า
2	Ban Chum Saeng Songkhram	บ้านชุมแสงสงคราม
3	Ban Wang Rae	บ้านวังแร่
4	Ban Nong Phayom	บ้านหนองพยอม
5	Ban Wat Thaen	บ้านวัดแตน
6	Ban Huang Gradai	บ้านห้วงกระได
7	Ban Nong Oh	บ้านหนองอ้อ
8	Ban Nong Phaeng Puay	บ้านหนองแพงพวย
9	Ban Thabak Ngam	บ้านตะแบกงาม
10	Ban Khlong Luek	บ้านคลองลึก
11	Ban Fak Khlong	บ้านฟากคลอง

== Domestic dog breed ==
Chum Saeng Songkhram is origin of Thai dog breed Thai Bangkaew Dog or just called Bang Kaew, a spitz-type dog.
