= Sai Ngam, Kamphaeng Phet =

Sai Ngam ไทรงาม
- Tambon
- Sai Ngam subdistrict ตำบลไทรงาม
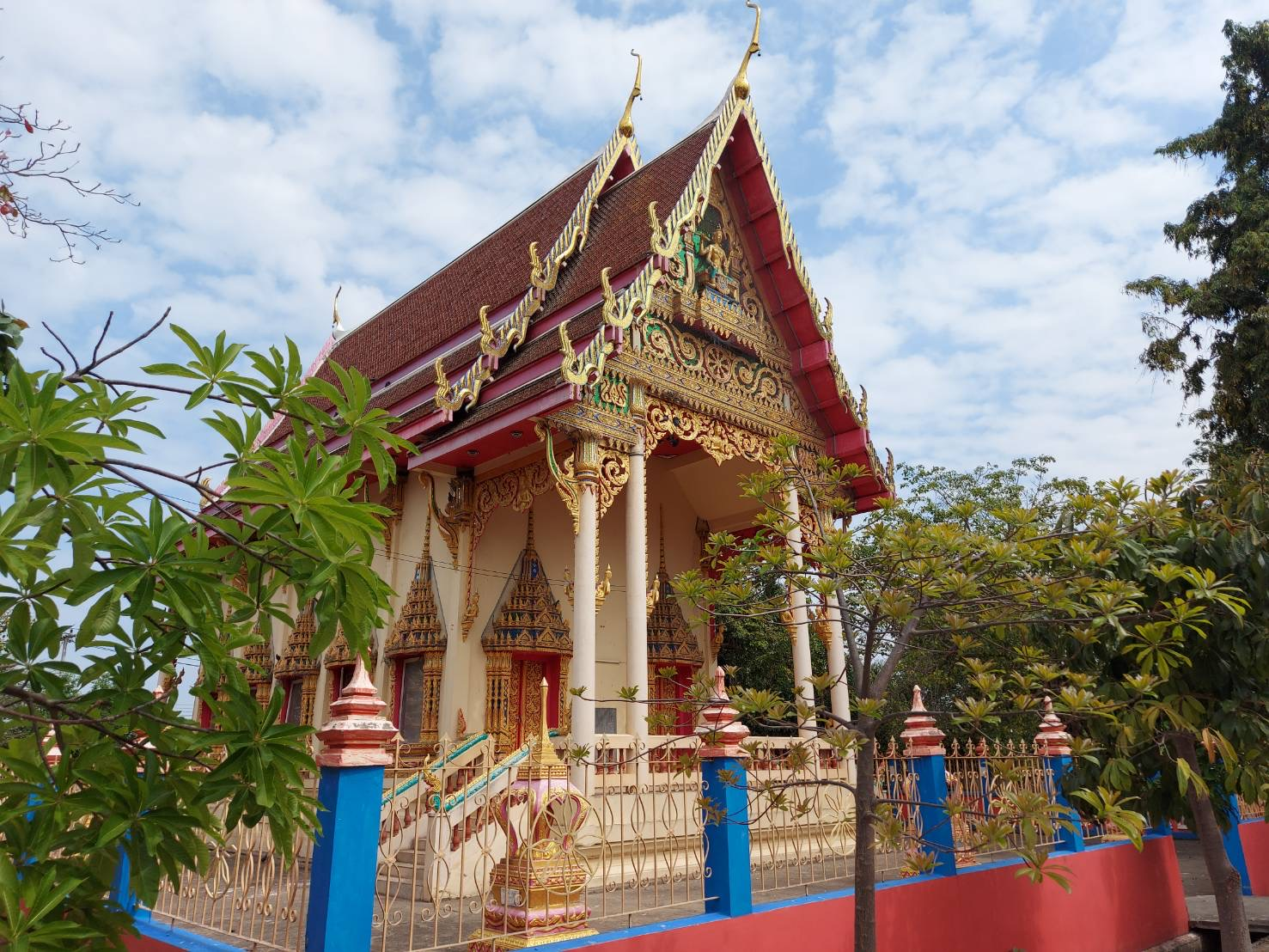
- Wat Thep Nimit Mongkhon
- Interactive map of Sai Ngam
- Coordinates: 16°28′01.0″N 99°53′24.9″E
- Country: Thailand
- Established: 1969
- Subdivisions: 10 villages

Area
  - Total: 77.96 km^{2} (30.10 sq mi)

Population (2023)
  - Total: ▼8,918
  - Density: 114/km^{2} (300/sq mi)
- Time zone: UTC+07 (TST)
- Postal code: 62150
- Geocode: 620201

Sai Ngam (Thai: ไทรงาม, pronounced [sāj ŋāːm]) is a subdistrict in the middle part of Sai Ngam, Kamphaeng Phet, Thailand, with an estimated population of 8,900 in 2023. Founded by Luang Pu In (หลวงปู่อินทร์), a Buddhist monk who came from Nakhon Sawan along with his family in 1958. It shares boundaries with the subdistricts of Nong Mai Kong to the east, Nong Mae Taeng to the south, and Nong Khla and Maha Chai to the west. In the north it borders with the Lan Krabue district (Chong Lom and Non Phluang). Sai Ngam is divided into 10 villages and governed by two local administrative bodies.

Originally, Sai Ngam was the part of Nong Khla, Mueang Kamphaeng Phet, where located in the Reserve Forest area. By the late 1950s, many people from Thung Sai and Nakhon Sawan came to settle around a swamp known as Nong Sai (หนองทราย) and named the village after it. The name was later changed to "Sai Ngam", and it was separated from Nong Khla to become a subdistrict in 1958.

A large section of the center of the subdistrict, including buildings and homes, covering 5.1 square kilometres (2.0 sq mi), is part of Sai Ngam subdistrict municipality. The subdistrict serves as the economic and educational center of the district. Most of the population practices Theravada Buddhism and is engaged in agriculture.

== Administration ==
=== Central administration ===
The tambon is subdivided into 10 administrative villages (muban).

No.	Name	Thai
1.	Ban Sai Ngam Nuea	บ้านไทรงามเหนือ
2.	Ban Noen Sam Ran	บ้านเนินสำราญ
3.	Ban Sai Ngam	บ้านไทรงาม
4.	Ban Sai Ngam	บ้านไทรงาม
5.	Ban Sai Ngam	บ้านไทรงาม
6.	Ban Nong Mai Daeng	บ้านหนองไม้แดง
7.	Ban Sai Ngam Tai	บ้านไทรงามใต้
8.	Ban Kaeo Chai Mongkol	บ้านแก้วชัยมงคล
9.	Ban Tham Sadao	บ้านถ้ำสะเดา
10.	Ban Dong Yen	บ้านดงเย็น

=== Local administration ===
The area of the subdistrict is shared by 2 local governments.

- the subdistrict municipality (Thesaban Tambon) Sai Ngam (เทศบาลตำบลไทรงาม)
- the subdistrict administrative organization (SAO) Sai Ngam (องค์การบริหารส่วนตำบลไทรงาม)
