= Lai River =

Lai River may refer to:

== Pakistan ==
- Lai Nullah, also Lai River, flowing from the Margalla Hills through Rawalpindi

== Papua New Guinea ==
- Lai River (Purari) is a tributary of the Purari River in Southern Highlands Province in the central highlands
- Lai River (Sepik) is a tributary of the Sepik River in Enga Province in the central highlands

== Thailand ==
- Nam Mae Lai is a tributary of the Yom River and part of the Chao Phraya River basin

== Vietnam ==
- Ba Lai River in the Mekong Delta region
- Lai Giang River, known as the Lai River, in central Vietnam by Bồng Sơn
