= Tha Nang Ngam =

Tha Nang Ngam ท่านางงาม
- Tambon
- District: Bang Rakam
- Province: Phitsanulok
- Country: Thailand

Population (2005)
  - Total: 5,531
- Time zone: UTC+7 (ICT)
- Postal code: 65140
- Geocode: 650410

Tha Nang Ngam (Thai: ท่านางงาม) is a sub-district in the Bang Rakam District of Phitsanulok Province, Thailand.

== Geography ==
Tha Nang Ngam lies in the Yom Basin, part of the Chao Phraya Watershed.

== Administration ==
The following is a list of the sub-district's muban (villages):

No.	English	Thai
1	Ban Tha Nang Ngam	บ้านท่านางงาม
2	Ban Krung Grak	บ้านกรุงกรัก
3	Ban Bang Gaew	บ้านบางแก้ว
4	Ban Prong Mo Kao	บ้านโปร่งหม้อข้าว
5	Ban Huai Chan	บ้านห้วยชัน
6	Ban Nachak Wai	บ้านนาชักหวาย
7	Ban Nong Pling	บ้านหนองปลิง
8	Ban Yan Yai	บ้านย่านใหญ่
9	Ban Yomrat	บ้านยมราช
10	Ban Taen Nang Ngam	บ้านแท่นนางงาม
11	Ban Mai Krung Thong	บ้านใหม่กรุงทอง
