= Yangjiang (disambiguation) =

Yangjiang is a prefecture-level city in Guangdong, China.

Yangjiang may also refer to the following towns in China:

- Yangjiang, Hainan (阳江), in Qionghai, Hainan
- Yangjiang, Jiangsu (阳江), in Nanjing, Jiangsu
- Yangjiang, Jiangxi (洋江), in Fenyi County, Jiangxi
- Yangjiang, Yunnan (漾江), in Yangbi Yi Autonomous County, Yunnan

== See also ==
- Yang Jiang (1911–2016), Chinese dramatist, writer, and translator
- Yang River (disambiguation)
- Yang Jian (disambiguation)
