= Wang Ithok =

Wang Ithok วังอิทก
- Tambon
- Interactive map of Wang Ithok
- Coordinates: 16°38′00″N 100°10′00″E
- Country: Thailand
- Province: Phitsanulok
- District: Bang Rakam

Population (2005)
  - Total: 4,652
- Time zone: UTC+7 (ICT)
- Postal code: 65140
- Geocode: 650404

Wang Ithok (Thai: วังอิทก) is a subdistrict in the Bang Rakam District of Phitsanulok Province, Thailand.

== Geography ==
Wang Ithok lies in the Yom Basin, which is part of the Chao Phraya Watershed.

== Administration ==
The following is a list of the sub-district's muban (villages):

No.	English	Thai
1	Ban Grap Phuang	บ้านกรับพวง
2	Ban Krathum Yot Nam	บ้านกระทุ่มยอดน้ำ
3	Ban Wang Ithok	บ้านวังอิทก
4	Ban Nong Thao Dam	บ้านหนองเต่าดำ
5	Ban Wat Klang	บ้านวัดกลาง
6	Ban Khlong Grap Phuang	บ้านคลองกรับพวง
7	Ban Wang Yai	บ้านวังใหญ่
8	Ban Tang Chaylimphragat	บ้านพันต่างเฉลิมพระเกียรติ
9	Ban Mai Chai Mongkhon	บ้านใหม่ชัยมงคล
10	Ban Phuang Thong	บ้านพวงทอง
