= YAI =

YAI may stand for:

- Yachting Association of India, the governing body for sailing in India
- Youth Action International, a non-profit organization
- You Am I, an Australian rock band
- YAI: Seeing Beyond Disability, a non-profit organization that serves people with intellectual and developmental disabilities

Yai may refer to:

- Yai River, Thailand

YAI or yai may also be an official code:

- IATA airport code YAI: General Bernardo O'Higgins Airport, Chillán, Chile
- ISO 639-3 language code yai: Yaghnobi language, a living, East Iranian language

People with the given name or surname Yai include:

- Yai Nilwong (born 1985), Thai footballer
- Anok Yai (born 1997), American fashion model of South Sudanese descent

== See also ==
- YA (disambiguation)
- Yao (disambiguation)
