= Thai Dog =

Thai Dog may refer to:

- Thai Bangkaew Dog
- Thai Ridgeback

== See also ==
- List of dog breeds by country § Thailand
