= Bueng Kok =

Bueng Kok บึงกอก
- Tambon
- Interactive map of Bueng Kok
- Coordinates: 16°41′00″N 100°02′00″E
- Country: Thailand
- Province: Phitsanulok
- District: Bang Rakam
- Elevation: 47 m (154 ft)

Population (2005)
  - Total: 9,688
- Time zone: UTC+7 (ICT)
- Postal code: 65140
- Geocode: 650405

Bueng Kok (Thai: บึงกอก) is a sub-district in the Bang Rakam District of Phitsanulok Province, Thailand.

== Geography ==
Bueng Kok lies in the Yom Basin, which is part of the Chao Phraya Watershed.

== Administration ==
The following is a list of the sub-district's muban (villages):

No.	English	Thai
1	Ban Bueng Kok	บ้านบึงกอก
2	Ban Prue Krathiam (part)	บ้านปรือกระเทียม
3	Ban kho Chan	บ้านเกาะจันทร์
4	Ban Khui Matoom	บ้านคุยมะตูม
5	Ban Kok Sawang	บ้านโคกสว่าง
6	Ban Khlong Toie	บ้านคลองเตย
7	Ban Sawoie Sung	บ้านเสวยซุง
8	Ban Prada	บ้านประดา
9	Ban Nong Bua	บ้านหนองบัว
10	Ban Buek Kok Phatana	บ้านบึกกอกพัฒนา
11	Ban Prue Krathiam Tai (South Ban Prue Krathiam)	บ้านปรือกระเทียมใต้
