= Nikhom Phatthana, Phitsanulok =

Nikhom Phatthana นิคมพัฒนา
- Tambon
- Interactive map of Nikhom Phatthana
- Coordinates: 16°43′27″N 99°58′11″E
- Country: Thailand
- Province: Phitsanulok
- District: Bang Rakam

Population (2005)
  - Total: 8,936
- Time zone: UTC+7 (ICT)
- Postal code: 65140
- Geocode: 650408

Nikhom Phatthana (Thai: นิคมพัฒนา) is a subdistrict in the Bang Rakam District of Phitsanulok Province, Thailand.

== Geography ==
Nikhom Phatthana lies in the Yom Basin, which is part of the Chao Phraya Watershed.

== Administration ==
The following is a list of the subdistrict's muban (villages):

| No. | English | Thai |
| 1 | Ban Thung Ai Ho | บ้านทุ่งอ้ายโห้ |
| 2 | Bang Mai Jaroen Phon | บ้านใหม่เจริญผล |
| 3 | Ban Mai Jaroen Tham | บ้านใหม่เจริญธรรม |
| 4 | Ban Khlong Namyen | บ้านคลองน้ำเย็น |
| 5 | Ban Nikhom Phattana | บ้านนิคมพัฒนา |
| 6 | Ban Pa Sak | บ้านป่าสัก |
| 7 | Ban Tha Maklua | บ้านท่ามะเกลือ |
| 8 | Ban Thung Yai | บ้านทุ่งใหญ่ |
| 9 | Ban Porn Sawan | บ้านพรสวรรค์ |
| 10 | Ban Nong Na Bua | บ้านหนองนาบัว |
| 11 | Ban Sri Nakharin | บ้านศรีนครินทร์ |
| 12 | Ban Bo Sai Ngam | บ้านบ่อไทรงาม |
