= Plak Raet =

Plak Raet ปลักแรด
- Tambon
- Interactive map of Plak Raet
- Coordinates: 16°40′00″N 100°06′00″E
- Country: Thailand
- Province: Phitsanulok
- District: Bang Rakam
- Elevation: 42 m (138 ft)

Population (2005)
  - Total: 8,329
- Time zone: UTC+7 (ICT)
- Postal code: 65140
- Geocode: 650402

Plak Raet (Thai: ปลักแรด) is a sub-district in the Bang Rakam District of Phitsanulok Province, Thailand.

== Geography ==
Plak Raet lies in the Yom Basin, which is part of the Chao Phraya Watershed.

== Administration ==
The following is a list of the subdistrict's muban, which roughly correspond to the villages:

No.	English	Thai
1 & 3 & 5	Ban Plak Raet	บ้านปลักแรด
2	Ban Dong Khok Kam	บ้านดงโคกขาม
4	Ban Nong Kaem	บ้านหนองแขม
6	Ban Lai Muesee	บ้านหล่ายมือสี
7	Ban Lai Pho	บ้านหล่ายโพธิ์
8	Ban Thung Sa	บ้านทุ่งซา
9	Ban Nong Maprang	บ้านหนองมะปราง
10	Ban Thapao Thong Chaylimphragat	บ้านตะเภาทองเฉลิมพระเกียรติ
