= Phan Sao =

Phan Sao พันเสา
- Tambon
- Interactive map of Phan Sao
- Coordinates: 16°39′00″N 100°05′00″E
- Country: Thailand
- Province: Phitsanulok
- District: Bang Rakam
- Elevation: 43 m (141 ft)

Population (2005)
  - Total: 6,108
- Time zone: UTC+7 (ICT)
- Postal code: 65140
- Geocode: 650403

Phan Sao (Thai: พันเสา) is a sub-district in the Bang Rakam District of Phitsanulok Province, Thailand.

== Geography ==
Phan Sao lies in the Yom Basin, which is part of the Chao Phraya Watershed.

== Administration ==
The following is a list of the sub-district's muban, (villages):

No.	English	Thai
1	Ban Hua Kua	บ้านหัวขัว
2 - 3	Ban Phan Sao	บ้านพันเสา
4	Ban Nong Pradoo	บ้านหนองประดู่
5	Ban Bon Daeng	บ้านบอนแดง
6	Ban Na Man	บ้านนาหมัน
7	Ban Laem Makha	บ้านแหลมมะค่า
8	Ban Lai Kanang	บ้านหล่ายขานาง
9	Ban Nong Bua Si Bat	บ้านหนองบัวสี่บาท
10	Ban Nong Thagoo	บ้านหนองตะกู
11	Ban Makha Ngam	บ้านมะค่างาม
