= Nong Kula =

Nong Kula หนองกุลา
- Tambon
- Interactive map of Nong Kula
- Coordinates: 16°39′00″N 99°57′00″E
- Country: Thailand
- Province: Phitsanulok
- District: Bang Rakam
- Elevation: 50 m (160 ft)

Population (2005)
  - Total: 14,273
- Time zone: UTC+7 (ICT)
- Postal code: 65140
- Geocode: 650406
- Chief roadway: Route 1065

Nong Kula (Thai: หนองกุลา) is a subdistrict in the Bang Rakam District of Phitsanulok Province, Thailand.

== Geography ==
Nong Kula lies in the Yom Basin, which is part of the Chao Phraya Watershed.

== Administration ==
The following is a list of the subdistrict's muban (villages):

No.	English	Thai
1	Ban Nong Grap	บ้านหนองกรับ
2	Ban Nong Phai	บ้านหนองไผ่
3	Ban Dong kwang	บ้านดงกวาง
4	Ban Nong Kula	บ้านหนองกุลา
5	Ban Nong Luang	บ้านหนองหลวง
6	Ban Bueng Bon	บ้านบึงบอน
7	Ban Bueng Jamka	บ้านบึงจำกา
8	Ban Nong Na	บ้านหนองนา
9	Ban Nong Takhian	บ้านหนองตะเคียน
10	Ban Bueng Phing	บ้านบึงพิง
11	Ban Mai Khlong Jaroen	บ้านใหม่คลองเจริญ
12	Ban Tha Mai Ngam	บ้านท่าไม้งาม
13	Ban Nong Phong	บ้านหนองโพง
14	Ban Nong Pluak	บ้านหนองปลวก
15	Ban Montian Thong	บ้านมณเฑียรทอง
16	Ban Huai Nam Yen	บ้านห้วยน้ำเย็น
17	Ban Pla Yana	บ้านปลายนา
18	Ban Gor Gang	บ้านเกาะก่าง
19	Ban Huai Yai	บ้านห้วยใหญ่
20	Ban Nong Khot	บ้านหนองคต
21	Ban Nong Chum Saeng	บ้านหนองชุมแสง
22	Ban nong kula tai	บ้านหนองกุลาใต้
