= Mok (disambiguation) =

Mok is a romanisation of several Chinese surnames, as well as a Dutch, Hungarian, and Korean surname.

Mok or MOK may also refer to:

- Mok clan, a noble clan in Korean history
- Mok language, a Palaungic language of China and Thailand
- Morori language (ISO 639-3: mok), a Trans-New Guinea language of Indonesian

== Locations ==
- Mok River, a tributary of the Yom River, Thailand
- Mok-dong (Mok Ward), a ward of Yangcheon District, Seoul, South Korea
- Mong Kok station (MTR station code), Hong Kong

== People ==
- Mok, Palatine of Hungary (fl. 12–13th century), Hungarian lord
- Hŏ Mok (1595–1682), Korean scholar-official of the Joseon dynasty
- MOK (born 1976), stage name of Tarkan Karaalioglu, a German rapper of Turkish descent
- Ta Mok (1924-2006), Khmer Rouge military chief

== Fictional characters ==
- Ookla the Mok, a character in Thundarr the Barbarian voiced by Henry Corden
- Mok, one of the title characters in Pok & Mok
- Mok, the antagonist of Rock & Rule

== Science and Technology ==
- Machine Owner Key, a computer booting security feature of Unified Extensible Firmware Interface (UEFI)
- RAGE (gene), a gene also denoted MOK
