= Bo Thong =

Bo Thong may refer to several places in Thailand:

- Bo Thong District in Chonburi Province
- Bo Thong, Bang Rakam
- Bo Thong, Uttaradit
