= Kosamphi Nakhon district =

Kosamphi Nakhon โกสัมพีนคร
- District
- District location in Kamphaeng Phet province
- Coordinates: 16°37′54″N 99°20′54″E
- Country: Thailand
- Province: Kamphaeng Phet
- Seat: Kosamphi

Area
  - Total: 476.167 km^{2} (183.849 sq mi)

Population (2005)
  - Total: 28,347
  - Density: 59.5/km^{2} (154/sq mi)
- Time zone: UTC+7 (ICT)
- Postal code: 62000
- Geocode: 6211

Kosamphi Nakhon (Thai: โกสัมพีนคร, pronounced [kōː.sǎm.pʰīː ná(ʔ).kʰɔ̄ːn]) is a district (amphoe) in the northwestern part of Kamphaeng Phet province, central Thailand.

== History ==
In Sukhothai Kingdom era, Mueang Kosamphi was a satellite city of the frontier city Mueang Chakangrao (Kamphaeng Phet), at same level as Mueang Nakhon Chum, Trai Trueng, Phan, and Phangkha. Archaeological evidence of the ancient city was found in Ban Khlong Mueang, Tambon Kosamphi.

The minor district was separated from Mueang Kamphaeng Phet district and created on 15 July 1996.

On 15 May 2007, all 81 minor districts were upgraded to full districts. On 24 August the upgrade became official.

== Geography ==
Neighboring districts are (from the northeast clockwise) Phran Kratai, Mueang Kamphaeng Phet of Kamphaeng Phet Province and Wang Chao and Mueang Tak of Tak province.

Important water resources are the Ping and Wang Chao River.

== Administration ==
The district is divided into three sub-districts (tambons), which are further subdivided into 43 villages (mubans). There are no municipal (thesaban) areas. There are three tambon administrative organizations (TAO).

No.	Name	Thai name	Villages	Pop.
1.	Kosamphi	โกสัมพี	25	17,627
2.	Phet Chomphu	เพชรชมภู	9	5,437
3.	Lan Dokmai Tok	ลานดอกไม้ตก	9	5,283
