= Yang River =

Yang River may refer to:

- Yang River (洋河, Yanghe), which flows into Yongding River in northern China
- Yang River (洋河, Yanghe), which flows into Jiaozhou Bay in Qingdao, Shandong Province, China
- Yang River (阳河, Yanghe, "Sunny River"), a tributary of the Xiaoqing River in Qingzhou, Shandong Province, China
- Lam Nam Yang (Thai: ลำน้ำยัง) in northeastern Thailand

== See also ==
- Yangjiang, a city and prefecture in Guangdong, China, named for the Yang River
