= Wachirabarami district =

Vajirabarami วชิรบารมี
- District
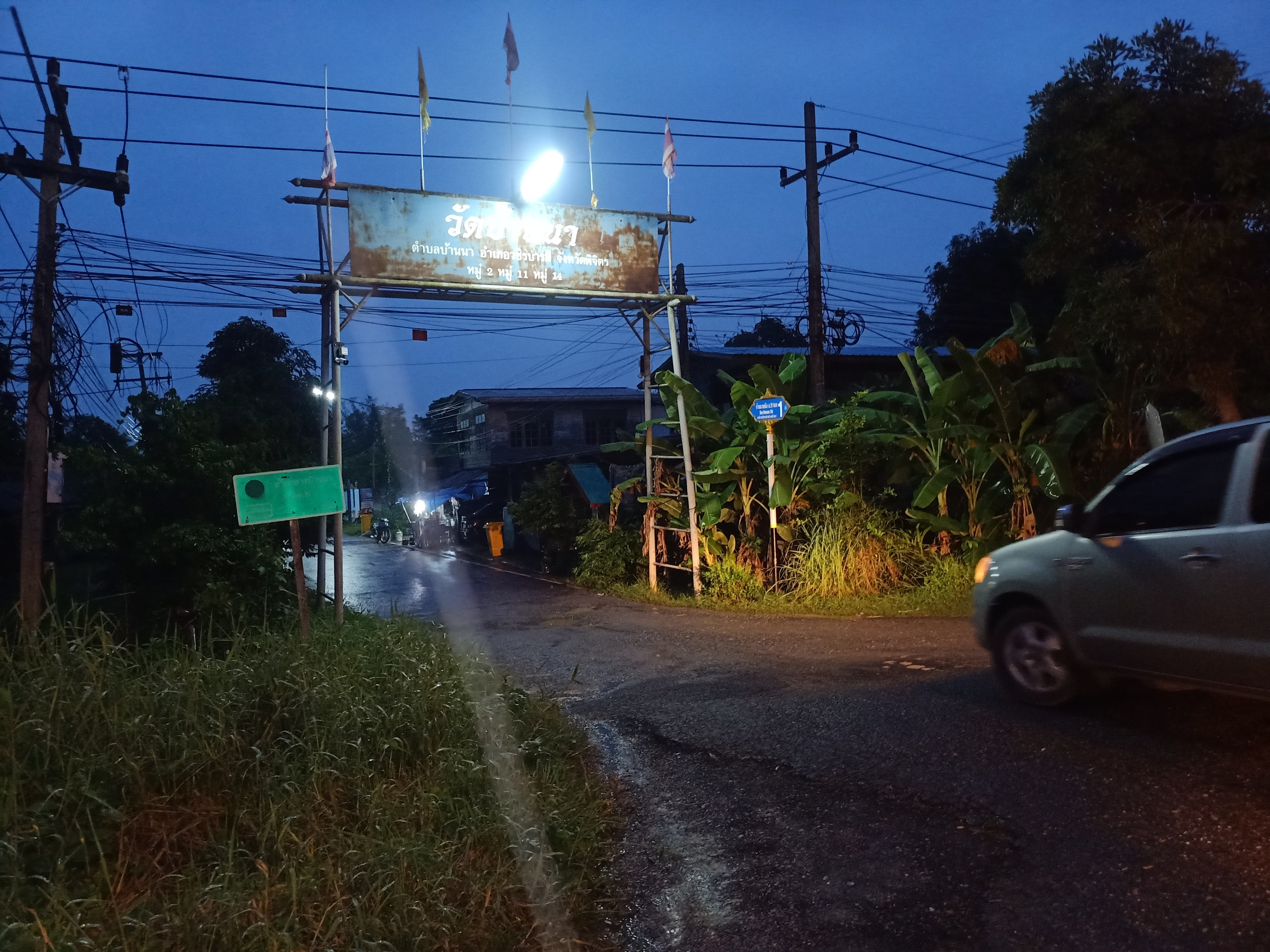

- District location in Phichit province
- Coordinates: 16°31′30″N 100°8′42″E
- Country: Thailand
- Province: Phichit
- Seat: Ban Na

Area
  - Total: 259.5 km^{2} (100.2 sq mi)

Population (2005)
  - Total: 30,739
  - Density: 118.5/km^{2} (307/sq mi)
- Time zone: UTC+7 (ICT)
- Postal code: 66140
- Geocode: 6612

Vajirabarami (Thai: วชิรบารมี, pronounced [wá.t͡ɕʰī.rá.bāː.rā.mīː]) is an amphoe in the northwestern part of Phichit province, central Thailand.

== Geography ==
Neighboring districts are (from the north clockwise) Bang Rakam of Phitsanulok province, Sam Ngam of Phichit Province, Sai Ngam and Lan Krabue of Kamphaeng Phet province.

== History ==
The district was established on 21 October 1998 by splitting off four tambons from Sam Ngam district.

== Administration ==
The district is divided into four sub-districts (tambons), which are further subdivided into 50 villages (mubans). There are no municipal (thesaban) areas, and four tambon administrative organizations (TAO).

No.	Name	Thai name	Villages	Pop.
1.	Ban Na	บ้านนา	16	10,155
2.	Bueng Bua	บึงบัว	12	8,353
3.	Wang Mok	วังโมกข์	10	6,610
4.	Nong Lum	หนองหลุม	12	5,621
