= Khui Muang =

คุยม่วง คุยม่วง
- Subdistrict
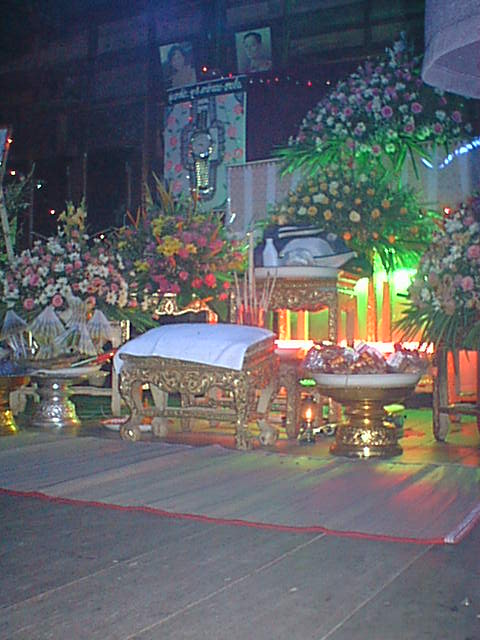
- Reminder for drowning children in Ban Nong Kha Nang
- Interactive map of คุยม่วง
- District: Bang Rakam
- Province: Phitsanulok
- Country: Thailand

Population (2005)
  - Total: 7,262
- Time zone: UTC+7 (ICT)
- Postal code: 65240
- Geocode: 650411

คุยม่วง (Thai: คุยม่วง) is a subdistrict in the Bang Rakam District of Phitsanulok Province, Thailand.

== Administration ==
The following is a list of the subdistrict's mubans (villages):

No.	English	Thai
1	Ban Khui Muang	บ้านคุยม่วง
2	Ban Khui Khwang	บ้านคุยขวาง
3	Ban koh klang Na	บ้านเกาะกลางนา
4	Ban Dong	บ้านดง
5	Ban Prong kra don	บ้านโปร่งกระโดน
6	Ban Nong Khanang	บ้านหนองขานาง
7	Ban Riang kradok	บ้านเรียงกระดก
8	Ban Thung Sao Noi	บ้านทุ่งสาวน้อย
9	Ban Thung Phattana	บ้านทุ่งพัฒนา
10	Ban Nang Phaya	บ้านนางพญา
11	Ban Ying Jaroen	บ้านยิ่งเจริญ
12	Ban Khui Muang Misuk	บ้านคุยม่วงมีสุข
