= Huai Mae Thawip =

Watercourse in Thailand

Coordinates: 14°50′N 99°40′E

Huai Mae Thawip (Thai: ห้วยแม่ทวีป, pronounced [hûa̯j mɛ̂ː tʰā.wîːp]) is a watercourse in the provinces of Kanchanaburi and Suphan Buri, Thailand. It is a tributary of Huai Krasiao, part of the Tha Chin River basin.
