= Bang Rakam district =

Bang Rakam บางระกำ
- District
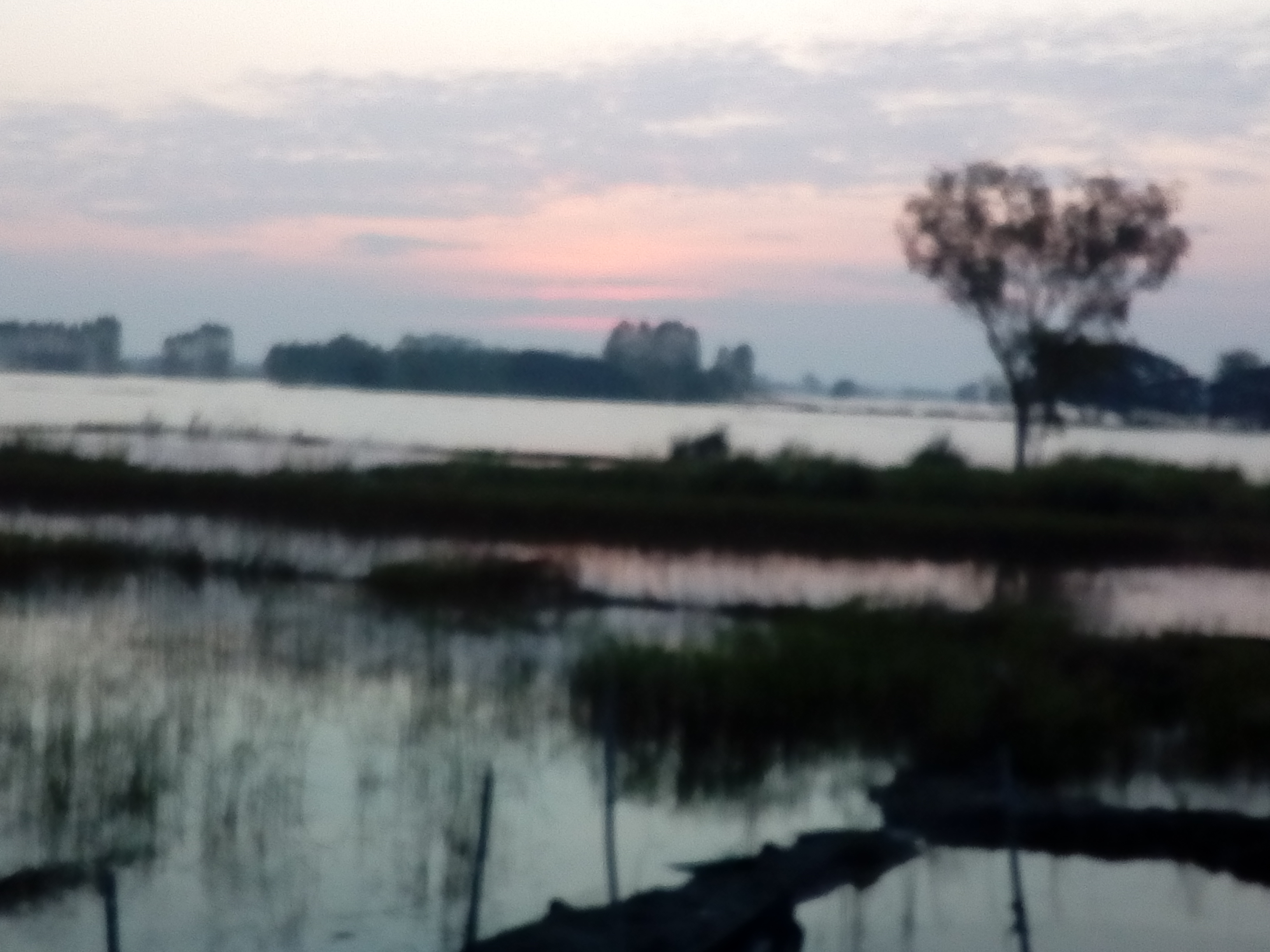
- A rice field scenery in Bang Rakam

- District location in Phitsanulok province
- Coordinates: 16°45′30″N 100°7′5″E
- Country: Thailand
- Province: Phitsanulok
- Seat: Bang Rakam

Area
  - Total: 936.0 km^{2} (361.4 sq mi)

Population (2025)
  - Total: 90,796
  - Density: 97/km^{2} (250/sq mi)
- Time zone: UTC+7 (ICT)
- Postcode: 65140
- Calling code: 055
- ISO 3166 code: TH-6504
- LAO code: 02650401

Bang Rakam (Thai: บางระกำ, pronounced [bāːŋ rā.kām]) is a district (amphoe) in the western part of Phitsanulok province, lower northern region of Thailand.

== History ==
The district was established on 10 December 1905, then named Chum Saeng (ชุมแสง) District. Khun Phadet Prachadun was the first district head officer. Later King Rama VI ordered the district name to be changed to be the same as the central tambon, thus the district name was changed to Bang Rakam on 24 April 1917.

== Geography ==
Neighboring districts are (from the north clockwise), Phrom Phiram, Mueang Phitsanulok, and Bang Krathum of Phitsanulok Province; Sam Ngam and Wachirabarami of Phichit province; Lan Krabue of Kamphaeng Phet province; Khiri Mat and Kong Krailat of Sukhothai province.

The district's chief water resources are the Yom River, and the secondary Khlong Bang Kaeo and Khlong Grung Grak. Bang Rakam lies within the Yom Basin, although the district's eastern border with Mueang Phitsanulok district is essentially the boundary between the Yom Basin and the Nan Basin. The distinction between the basins is blurry in this region, as the terrain is flat, and residents have diverted much of the water flow for agriculture over the years. Both basins are part of the Chao Phraya Watershed.

== Administration ==
=== Provincial government ===
The district is divided into 11 subdistricts (tambons), which are further subdivided into 142 villages (mubans), as of 2025: 90,796 people of 34,930 families.

No	Subdistrict	Population	Villages
1	Bang Rakam	16,799	19
2	Plak Raet	7,784	10
3	Phan Sao	5,941	11
4	Wang Ithok	4,389	11
5	Bueng Kok	9,157	12
6	Nong Kula	14,229	22
7	Chum Saeng Songkhram	7,562	11
8	Nikhom Phatthana	7,930	13
9	Bo Thong	4,305	10
10	Tha Nang Ngam	5,734	11
11	Khui Muang	6,966	12
	Total population	90,796	142

=== Local government ===
There are five subdistrict municipalities (thesaban tambon). Bang Rakam municipality covers villages 1–7 and Bang Rakam Muang Mai municipality is responsible for the remaining area of Bang Rakam subdistrict. Plak Raet municipality covers villages 1, 3 and 5 and Bueng Raman municipality is responsible for the remaining area of Plak Raet subdistrict. Phan Sao municipality covers the whole Phan Sao subdistrict.

Subdistrict municipality	Population
Bang Rakam Muang Mai	12,847
Phan Sao	5,941
Bueng Raman	4,373
Bang Rakam	3,952
Plak Raet	3,411

Further there are eight subdistrict administrative organizations (SAO), which all cover the whole same-named subdistrict.

== Flooding ==
During the rainy season of 2006, 24,400 Bang Rakam residents were affected by flooding, including 1,122 residents who contracted conjunctivitis. In late-September 2006, Princess Siribha Chudhabhorn sent trucks of food from the Princess Pa Foundation to assist 11 of the district's villages. In 2006, there were also reported cases of leptospirosis among residents of Bang Rakam, contracted due to the amount of standing water.

== Geology ==
The Thung Yai oil field is in Bang Rakam.
