= Bo Thong, Phitsanulok =

Bo Thong บ่อทอง
- Tambon
- District: Bang Rakam
- Province: Phitsanulok
- Country: Thailand

Population (2005)
  - Total: 4,321
- Time zone: UTC+7 (ICT)
- Postal code: 65140
- Geocode: 650409

Bo Thong (Thai: บ่อทอง) is a subdistrict in the Bang Rakam District of Phitsanulok Province, Thailand.

== Geography ==
Bo Thong lies in the Yom Basin, which is part of the Chao Phraya Watershed.

== Administration ==
The following is a list of the subdistrict's muban (villages):

No.	English	Thai
1	Ban Nong Bua	บ้านหนองบัว
2	Ban Bo Thong	บ้านบ่อทอง
3	Ban Nong Tha Kieaw	บ้านหนองตาเขียว
4	Ban Pho Prasat	บ้านโพธิ์ประสาท
5	Ban Gwang An	บ้านกวางอั้น
6	Ban Nong Na	บ้านหนองนา
7	Ban Dong Yang	บ้านดงยาง
8	Ban Nong Nang Nuan	บ้านหนองนางนวล
9	Ban Nong Oh	บ้านหนองอ้อ
10	Ban Don Apai	บ้านดอนอภัย
