= Sai Ngam district =

Sai Ngam ไทรงาม
- District
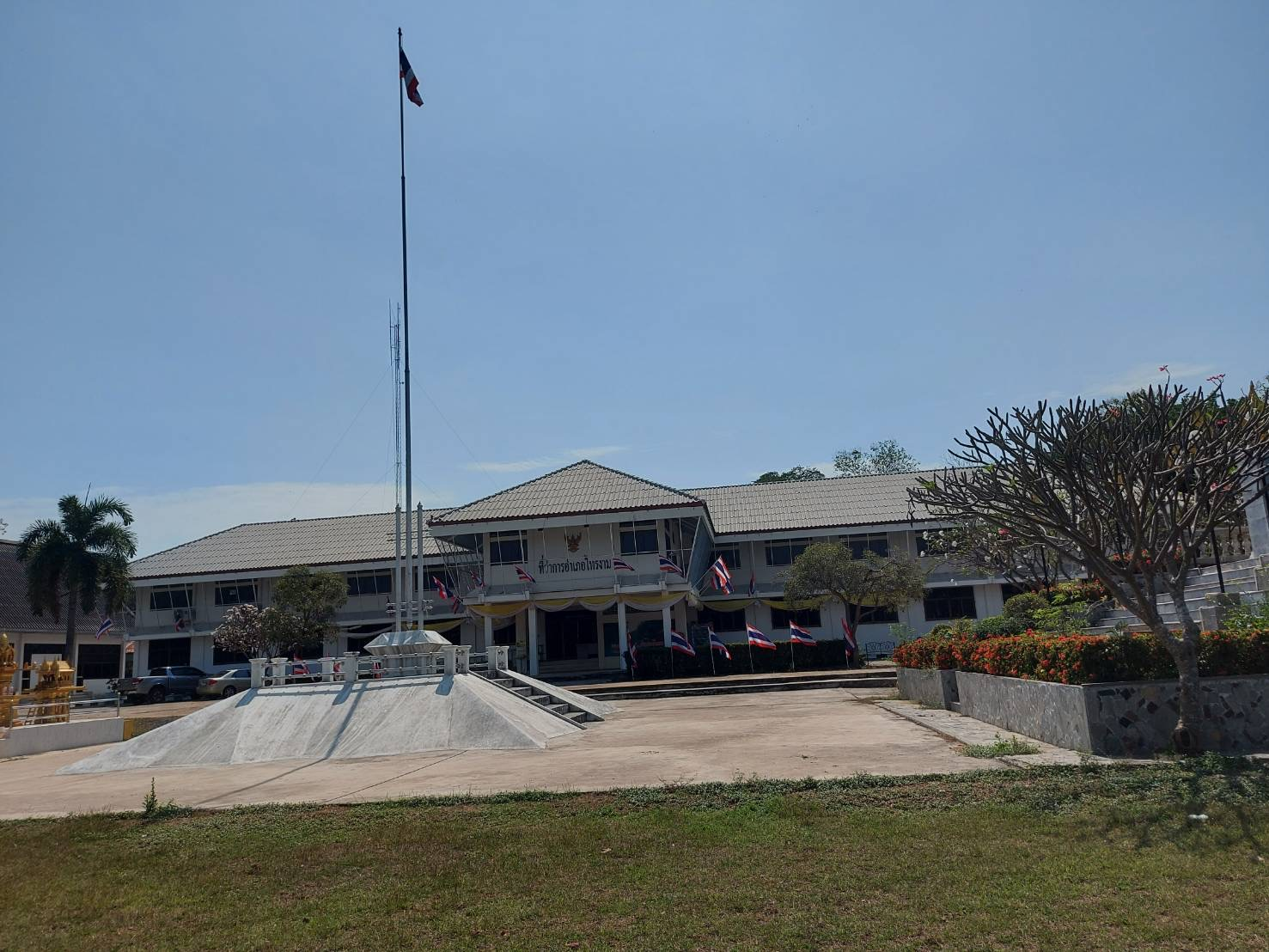
- District office, Sai Ngam District, Kamphaeng Phet Province, Thailand.

- District location in Kamphaeng Phet province
- Coordinates: 16°28′20″N 99°53′48″E
- Country: Thailand
- Province: Kamphaeng Phet
- Seat: Sai Ngam

Area
  - Total: 448.9 km^{2} (173.3 sq mi)

Population (2005)
  - Total: 51,183
  - Density: 114/km^{2} (300/sq mi)
- Time zone: UTC+7 (ICT)
- Postal code: 62150
- Geocode: 6202

Sai Ngam (Thai: ไทรงาม, pronounced [sāj ŋāːm]) is a district (amphoe) in the eastern part of Kamphaeng Phet province, central Thailand.

== Geography ==
Neighboring districts are (from the south clockwise) Sai Thong Watthana, Mueang Kamphaeng Phet, Phran Kratai, Lan Krabue of Kamphaeng Phet Province, Wachirabarami and Sam Ngam of Phichit province.

== History ==
The minor district (king amphoe) Sai Ngam was created on 15 May 1975, when the two tambons Sai Ngam and Nong Khla were split off from Mueang Kamphaeng Phet district. It was upgraded to a full district on 25 March 1979.

== Administration ==
The district is divided into seven sub-districts (tambons), which are further subdivided into 72 villages (mubans). Sai Ngam is a township (thesaban tambon) and covers parts of tambon Sai Ngam. There are a further seven tambon administrative organizations (TAO).

No.	Name	Thai name	Villages	Pop.
1.	Sai Ngam	ไทรงาม	10	9,098
2.	Nong Khla	หนองคล้า	8	5,279
3.	Nong Thong	หนองทอง	11	6,746
4.	Nong Mai Kong	หนองไม้กอง	10	6,860
5.	Maha Chai	มหาชัย	12	7,317
6.	Phan Thong	พานทอง	10	7,917
7.	Nong Mae Taeng	หนองแม่แตง	11	7,966
