= Ngao River =

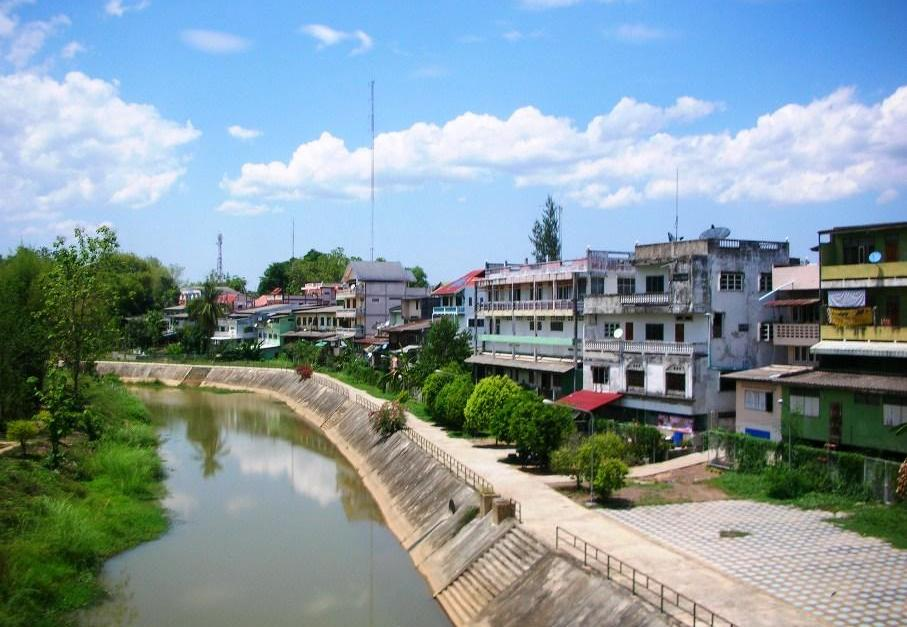
- Ngao River in Ngao town
- Native name: แม่น้ำงาว (Thai)

Location
- Country: Thailand
- State: Phayao Province, Lampang Province, Phrae Province
- City: Ngao town

Physical characteristics
- Source
  - location: Phi Pan Nam Range, Phayao Province
  - elevation: 1,267 m (4,157 ft)
- Mouth: Yom River
  - location: Kaeng Suea Ten area, Song District, Phrae Province
  - coordinates: 18°35′54″N 100°8′53″E
  - elevation: 195 m (640 ft)
- Length: 98 km (61 mi)
- Basin size: 1,800 km^{2} (690 sq mi)

The Ngao River (Thai: แม่น้ำงาว, RTGS: Maenam Ngao, pronounced [mɛ̂ː.náːm ŋāːw]; Northern Thai: ᨶᩣᩴ᩶ᩯᨾ᩵ᨦᩣ᩠ᩅ, pronounced [náːm mɛ̂ː.ŋāːw]) is a river of Thailand with its source in the Phi Pan Nam Range. It is a tributary of the Yom River, part of the Chao Phraya River basin.

The Ngao in this basin should not be confused with the Ngao River that is a tributary of the Yuam River (แม่น้ำยวม), part of the Salween basin, located to the west.

== See also ==
- Tributaries of the Chao Phraya River
