= Phran Kratai district =

Phran Kratai พรานกระต่าย
- District
- District location in Kamphaeng Phet province
- Coordinates: 16°39′53″N 99°35′19″E
- Country: Thailand
- Province: Kamphaeng Phet

Area
  - Total: 781.9 km^{2} (301.9 sq mi)

Population (2005)
  - Total: 68,529
  - Density: 87.6/km^{2} (227/sq mi)
- Time zone: UTC+7 (ICT)
- Postal code: 62110
- Geocode: 6206

Phran Kratai (Thai: พรานกระต่าย, pronounced [pʰrāːn krā.tàːj]) is the northernmost district (amphoe) of Kamphaeng Phet province, central Thailand.

== History ==
The name of the district translates to 'rabbit hunter' and refers to a local legend. A hunter (phran) surveyed southward to seek a strategic location to build a frontier city for Sukhothai Kingdom. When he spent the night in the area of the district, he found a golden haired rabbit (kratai) in front of a cave, which however quickly disappeared. The hunter reported his discovery to the King of Sukhothai and volunteered to catch the rabbit. He set a permanent village in front of the cave, but cannot catch the rabbit. Later more and more people moved to stay in the village. They called their village Ban Phran Kratai to commemorate the hunter.

Phran Kratai was made a district in 1895.

== Geography ==
Neighboring districts are (from the southeast clockwise): Lan Krabue, Sai Ngam, Mueang Kamphaeng Phet, Kosamphi Nakhon of Kamphaeng Phet Province; Mueang Tak of Tak province; Ban Dan Lan Hoi and Khiri Mat of Sukhothai province.

== Administration ==
The district is divided into 10 subdistricts (tambons), which are further subdivided into 116 villages (mubans). Phran Kratai is a subdistrict municipality (thesaban tambon) which covers parts of tambons Phran Kratai and Tham Kratai Thong. There are a further 10 tambon administrative organizations (TAO).

| No. | Name | Thai name | Villages | Pop. |
|---|---|---|---|---|
| 1. | Phran Kratai | พรานกระต่าย | 13 | 11,147 |
| 2. | Nong Hua Wua | หนองหัววัว | 8 | 4,461 |
| 3. | Tha Mai | ท่าไม้ | 14 | 8,583 |
| 4. | Wang Khuang | วังควง | 12 | 6,817 |
| 5. | Wang Tabaek | วังตะแบก | 10 | 4,851 |
| 6. | Khao Khirit | เขาคีริส | 18 | 7,963 |
| 7. | Khui Ban Ong | คุยบ้านโอง | 8 | 4,249 |
| 8. | Khlong Phikrai | คลองพิไกร | 10 | 5,996 |
| 9. | Tham Kratai Thong | ถ้ำกระต่ายทอง | 14 | 9,305 |
| 10. | Huai Yang | ห้วยยั้ง | 9 | 5,157 |
