= Bang Rakam subdistrict =

Bang Rakam บางระกำ
- Tambon
- Interactive map of Bang Rakam
- Coordinates: 16°45′00″N 100°07′00″E
- Country: Thailand
- Province: Phitsanulok
- District: Bang Rakam

Population (2006)
  - Total: 16,841
- Time zone: UTC+7 (ICT)
- Postal code: 65140
- Geocode: 650401
- Chief roadway: Route 1065
- Chief watercourse: Yom River

Bang Rakam (Thai: บางระกำ) is a subdistrict in the Bang Rakam District of Phitsanulok Province, Thailand.

== Geography ==
Bang Rakam lies in the Yom Basin, which is part of the Chao Phraya Watershed. The Yom River flows through the subdistrict.

== Administration ==
No.	English	Thai
1	Ban Rai	บ้านไร่
2	Ban Wang Pet	บ้านวังเป็ด
3	Ban Tha Ko	บ้านท่าโก
4	Ban Khlong Wat Rai	บ้านคลองวัดไร่
5	Ban Thamai	บ้านตะโม่
6	Ban Yang Kaew Oo	บ้านยางแขวนอู่
7	Ban Bang Rakam	บ้านบางระกำ
8	Ban Laem Chedi	บ้านแหลมเจดีย์
9	Ban Gao Rang	บ้านเก้ารัง
10	Ban Wang Dan	บ้านวังดาน
11	Ban Bueng kat	บ้านบึงคัด
12	Ban Nong Kao Khwae	บ้านหนองเขาควาย
13	Ban Khui Yang	บ้านคุยยาง
14	Ban Rai Glang	บ้านไร่กลาง
15	Ban Wang Gum	บ้านวังกุ่ม
16	Ban Thaluk Raet	บ้านตลุกแรด
17	Ban Hua Bueng	บ้านหัวบึง
18	Ban Sri Mongkhon	บ้านศรีมงคล
19	Ban khlong wat rai nuea	บ้านคลองวัดไร่เหนือ

== Industry ==
Ban Wang Gum is home to the Phitsanulok plant of Tipco Asphalt PCL. Tipco manufactures cationic asphalt emulsion, cutback asphalt and polymer modified asphalt cement.
