= Thai Bangkaew Dog =

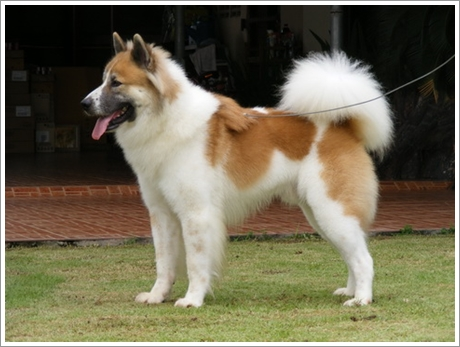
- Origin: Bang Rakam, Phitsanulok, Thailand
Traits
| Height | Males | 46–56 cm (18–22 in) |
| | Females | 41–50 cm (16–19.5 in) |
| Weight | Males | 18–20 kg (39–43 lb) |
| | Females | 16–18 kg (35–40 lb) |
- Coat: Double
- Colour: Pied White Cream Black Gray Brown Red
Kennel club standards
- Fédération Cynologique Internationale: standard

The Thai Bangkaew Dog (Thai: ไทยบางแก้ว) is a dog breed from Thailand. It is a medium-sized spitz-type dog.

== History ==
Bangkaew is a village located in the Bang Rakam District, Phitsanulok Province in the central region of Thailand. In this district, near the Yom River, a Buddhist abbot's local black and white female dog was crossed with a now extinct wild dog, producing the first of the breed. Since 1957, selective breeding from their single litters produced today's breed.

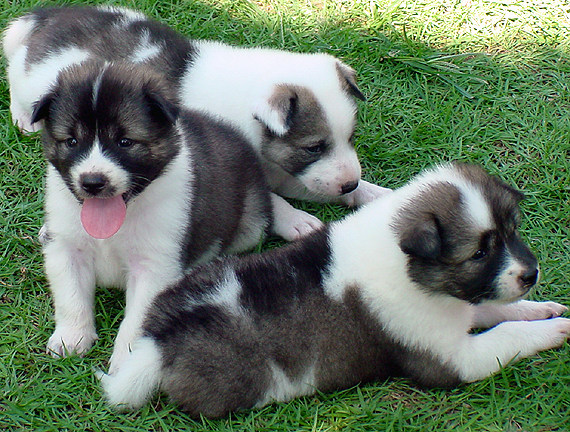
A Thai Bangkaew Dog puppies

== See also ==
- List of dog breeds
