= Huai Nam Duk =

Watercourse in Phetchabun Province, Thailand

Huai Nam Duk (Thai: ห้วยน้ำดุก, pronounced [hûa̯j náːm dùk]) is a watercourse in Phetchabun Province, Thailand. It is a tributary of the Pa Sak River, part of the Chao Phraya River basin.
