= Khlong San Thao =

Watercourse in Thailand

Coordinates: 16°09′N 100°26′E

Khlong San Thao (Thai: คลองสันเทา, pronounced [kʰlɔ̄ːŋ sǎn tʰāw]) is a watercourse in the provinces of Phetchabun and Phichit, Thailand, and part of the overall Chao Phraya River basin. It is a tributary of the Nan River in the lower Nan basin.

The watercourse is referred to by various local names including the Khlong Duea (คลองเดื่อ), Khlong Yai (คลองใหญ่), Khlong Wang Pong (คลองวังโป่ง), Khlong Phikun (คลองพิกุล), Khlong Lam Prada (คลองลำประดา), Khlong Daeng (คลองแดง), Khlong Thap Khlo (คลองทับคล้อ), Khlong Bang Phai (คลองบางไผ่), Khlong Thai Thung (คลองท้ายทุ่ง) and Khlong San Thao.
