= Huai Khon Kaen =

River in Thailand

Huai Khon Kaen (Thai: ห้วยขอนแก่น, pronounced [hûa̯j kʰɔ̌ːn kɛ̀n]) is a watercourse in Phetchabun Province, Thailand. It is a tributary of the Pa Sak River, part of the Chao Phraya River basin.
