= Nam Mae Kham Mi =

Watercourse in Thailand

The Nam Mae Kham Mi (Thai: น้ำแม่คำมี) is a watercourse in Thailand. It is a tributary of the Yom River, which is part of the Chao Phraya River basin.
