= Yai River =

River in Thailand

Coordinates: 14°20′N 101°05′E

The Yai River is a river of Thailand. It is a tributary of the Pa Sak River, part of the Chao Phraya River basin.

== See also ==
- Tributaries of the Chao Phraya River
