= Nam Ngim =

Watercourse in Thailand

Coordinates: 19°16′N 100°22′E

The Nam Ngim (Thai: น้ำงิม, pronounced [náːm ŋīm]) is a watercourse in Northern Thailand. Its source is located in the Phi Pan Nam Range. It is a tributary of the Yom River, which is part of the Chao Phraya River basin.
