= Nam Khuan =

Watercourse in Thailand

The Nam Khuan (Thai: น้ำควร, pronounced [náːm kʰūa̯n]) is a watercourse of Thailand. It is a tributary of the Yom River, part of the Chao Phraya River basin.
