= Khlong Ban Bong =

Watercourse in Thailand

Khlong Ban Bong (Thai: คลองบ้านบง, pronounced [kʰlɔ̄ːŋ bâːn bōŋ]) is a watercourse of Thailand. It is a tributary of the Pa Sak River, part of the Chao Phraya River basin.
