= Huai Mae Sin =

Watercourse in Thailand

The Huai Mae Sin (Thai: ห้วยแม่สิน, pronounced [hûa̯j mɛ̂ː sǐn]) is a watercourse of Thailand. It is a tributary of the Yom River, forming part of the Chao Phraya River basin.
