= Pa Sak River =

Coordinates: 14°21′51″N 100°34′48″E

Pa Sak River (แม่น้ำป่าสัก)
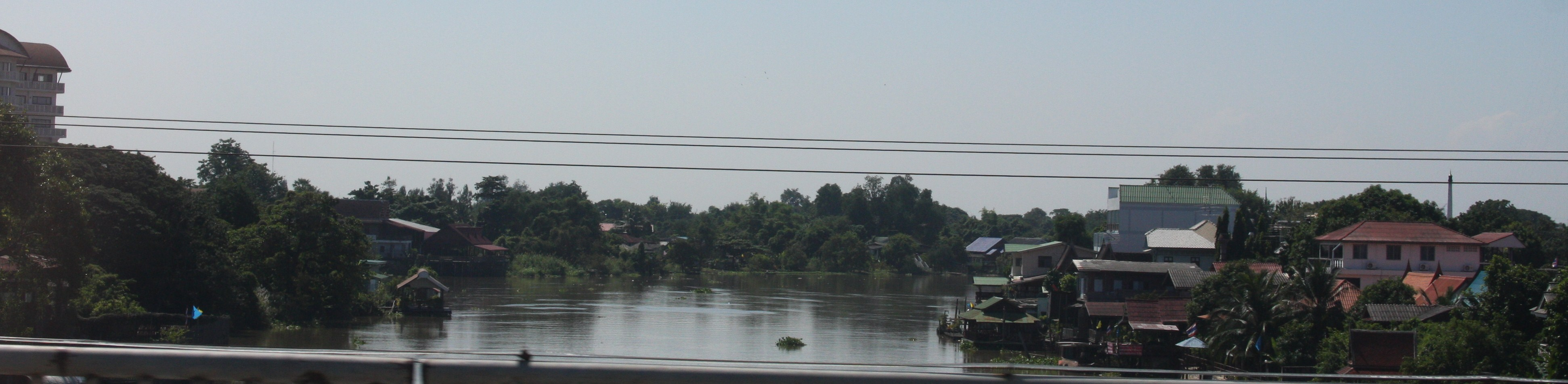
- The Pa Sak River flowing east of Ayuttaya's old city

Location
- Country: Thailand

Physical characteristics
- Source
  - location: Phetchabun Mountains
- Mouth
  - location: Chao Phraya River at Ayutthaya Island
- Length: 513 km (319 mi)
- Basin size: 16,291 km^{2} (6,290 sq mi)
- Discharge
  - average: 2.4 km^{3} (0.58 cu mi)/yr

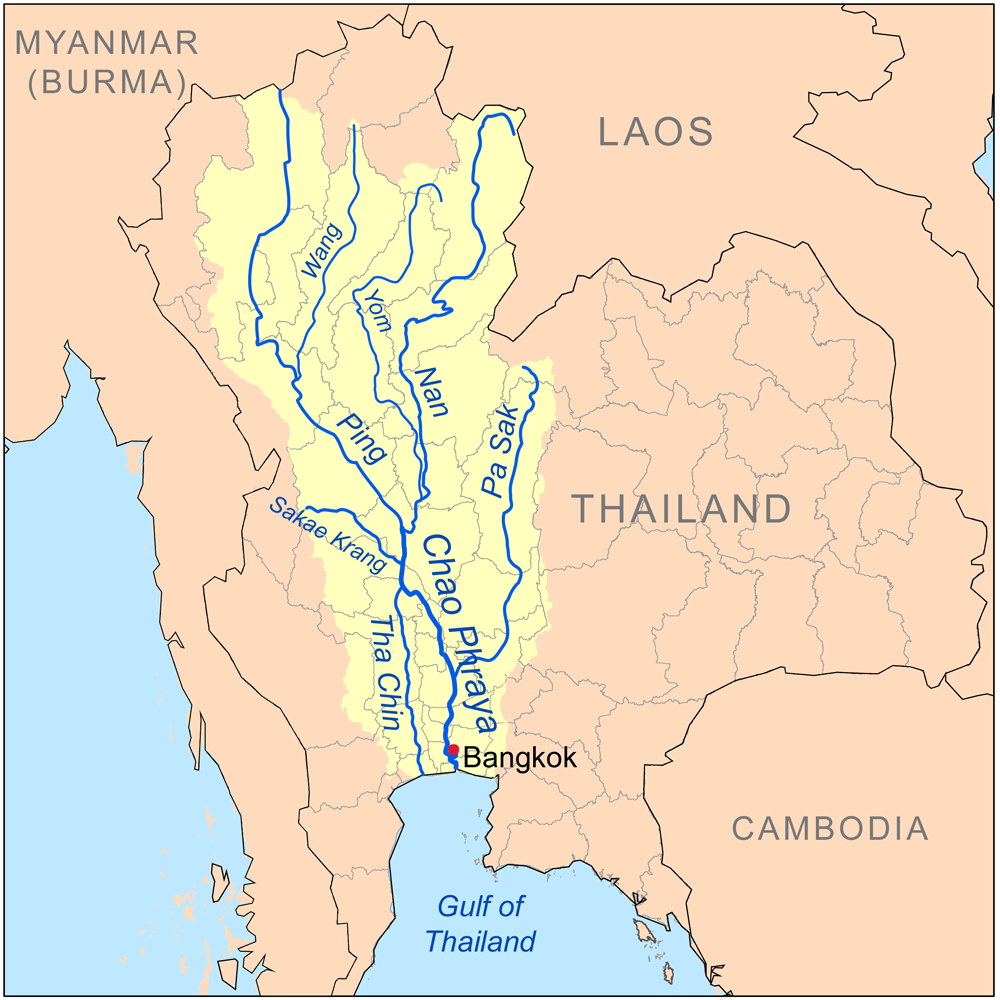
The Chao Phraya River drainage basin showing the Pa Sak River

The Pa Sak River (Thai: แม่น้ำป่าสัก, RTGS: Maenam Pa Sak, IPA: [mɛ̂ːnáːm pàː sàk], pronunciation) is a river in central Thailand. The river originates in the Phetchabun Mountains, Dan Sai District, Loei Province, and passes through Phetchabun Province as the backbone of the province. It then passes through the eastern part of Lopburi Province and Saraburi Province, until it joins the Lopburi River northeast of Ayutthaya Island, before it runs into the Chao Phraya River southeast of Ayutthaya near Phet Fortress. It has a length of 513 km (319 mi) and drains a watershed of 16,291 km^{2} (6,290 sq mi). The annual discharge is 2.4 km^{3} (0.58 cu mi).

The valley of the Pa Sak through the Phetchabun Mountains is a dominant feature of Phetchabun Province. Water levels vary seasonally. To address drought problems in the lower Pa Sak valley, the Pa Sak Cholasit Dam (เขื่อนป่าสักชลสิทธิ์) in Lopburi Province was built in the 1990s. The 4,860-meter (15,940 ft) wide and 36.5-meter (120 ft) high dam retains 0.785 km^{3} (0.188 cu mi) of water. The dam also supplies about 6.7 MW of electricity.

== Tributaries ==
Tributaries of the Pa Sak include the Lopburi River, Khlong Muak Lek, Huai Nam Phung, Huai Pa Daeng, Khlong Lam Kong, Lam Sonthi, Khlong Wang Chomphu, Khlong Huai Na, Huai Nam Chun, Huai Nam Duk, Huai Khon Kaen, Huai Yai, Khlong Saduang Yai, Khlong Ban Bong, Khlong Tarang, and Lam Phaya Klang.

== Pa Sak Basin ==
The Pa Sak drains an area of 16,291 square kilometres (6,290 mi^{2}). The Pa Sak Basin is part of the Chao Phraya watershed.

== Cultural and societal significance ==
In addition to being used as a waterway, no less than 60 years ago, the course of the Pa Sak River, especially in Phra Nakhon Si Ayutthaya Province, was well known for its Khanom chin as well as its use as a waterway. Because of this, it was also known as Khlong Khanom chin. Additionally, the water in the canal was clean and clear, suitable for consumption and use. It was the habitat of the zig-zag eel, an eel-like freshwater fish considered a delicacy.

Around the same time, Wat Mondop, located across from the Hua Ro quarter, was an important pier where people boarded boats bound for Bangkok. Around this area, many rafts and boats sold Khanom chin as well as other Khanom Thai (Thai snacks and sweets), including Khanom thuai, Khanom thuai fu, Khanom mo kaeng, Khanom tan, Khanom kluai, Khao lam, Khao mak, Lot chong, Pakrim khai tao, Thong yip, and Thong yod. Many of these were made by people living along the river, which was referred to as Khlong Hantra.

Today, Pa Sak River in the Khlong Khanom chin section, is still known for producing Khanom chin and Lot chong to sell at Hua Ro market.

Moreover, in terms of folk traditions, there is a natural khlong linking Khlong Bang Kaeo in Maha Rat District and the river at Nakhon Luang District. On its banks are two important Buddhist temples, Wat Khot Khema Pitaram and Wat Tan En, which are gathering places for flying foxes. During the 11th and 12th Thai lunar months, following the Buddhist retreat, Wan Ok Phansa, when the waters rise and the paddies flood, it used to be a time for courting, boat song festivals, and boat races between the two temples. Nowadays, only the boat racing tradition is still preserved.
