= Huai Chin Si =

Watercourse in Thailand

Coordinates: 13°28′N 99°49′E

Huai Chin Si (Thai: ห้วยชินสีห์, pronounced [hûa̯j t͡ɕʰīn sǐː]) is a watercourse in Ratchaburi Province, Thailand. It is a tributary of the Mae Klong River.
