= Khlong Bang Len =

Watercourse in Thailand

Coordinates: 14°04′N 100°03′E

Khlong Bang Len (Thai: คลองบางเลน, pronounced [kʰlɔ̄ːŋ bāːŋ lēːn]) is a watercourse in Nakhon Pathom Province, Thailand. It is a tributary of the Tha Chin River.
