= Khlong Huai Na =

River in Thailand

Khlong Huai Na (Thai: คลองห้วยนา, pronounced [kʰlɔ̄ːŋ hûa̯j nāː]) is a watercourse of Thailand. It is a tributary of the Pa Sak River, part of the Chao Phraya River basin.
