= Nam Pi =

Watercourse in Thailand

The Nam Pi (Thai: น้ำปี้, pronounced [náːm pîː]) is a watercourse in Thailand's provinces Phayao and Nan. It is a tributary of the Yom River, part of the Chao Phraya River basin.
