= Mueang Kamphaeng Phet district =

Mueang Kamphaeng Phet เมืองกำแพงเพชร
- District
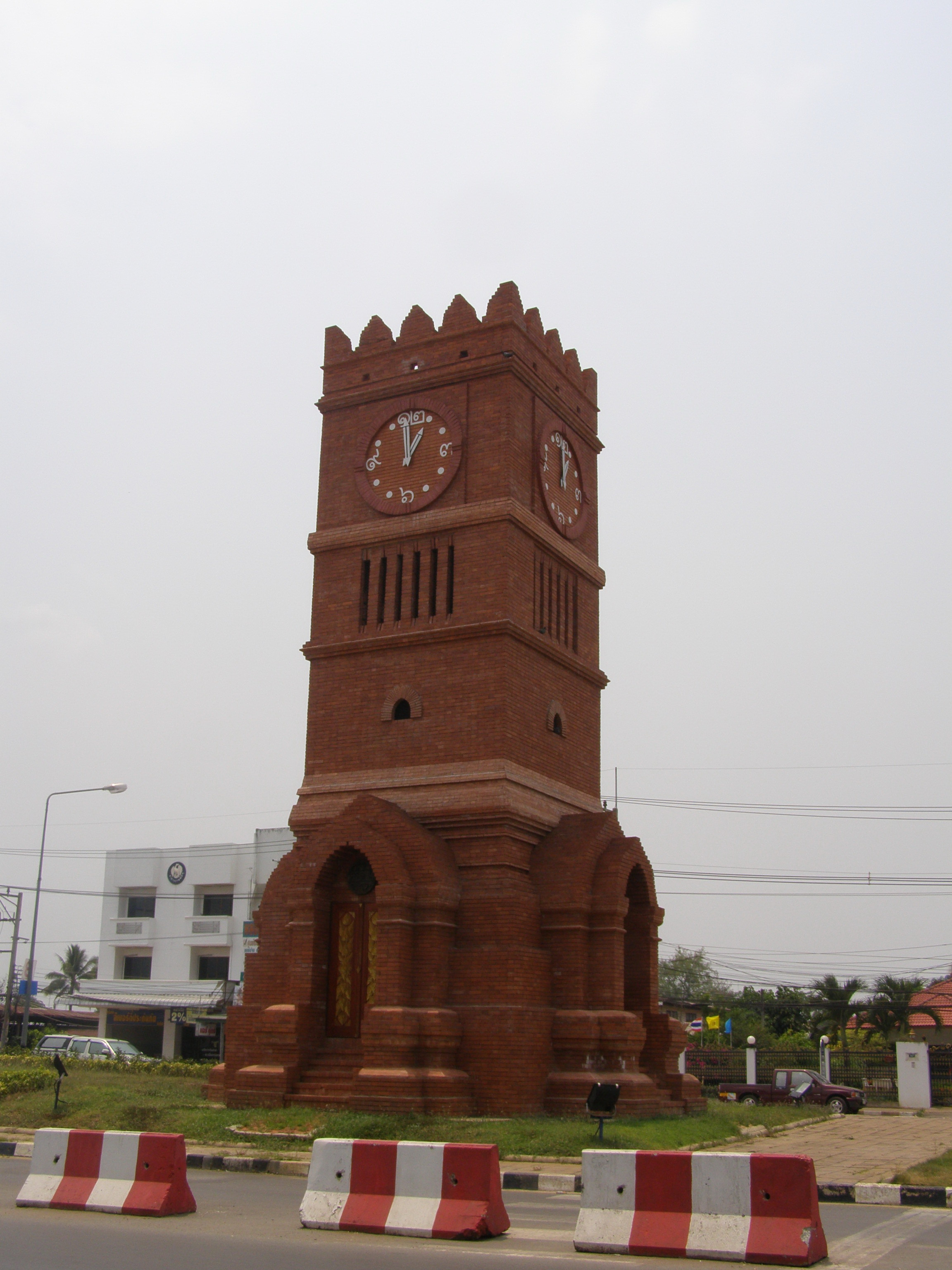
- Mueang Kamphaeng Phet Clock Tower located at the entrance of Mueang Kamphaeng Phet close to Wongwian Ton Pho

- District location in Kamphaeng Phet province
- Coordinates: 16°29′0″N 99°31′12″E
- Country: Thailand
- Province: Kamphaeng Phet
- Seat: Nai Mueang

Area
  - Total: 1,962.0 km^{2} (757.5 sq mi)

Population (2015)
  - Total: 213,228
  - Density: 108.1/km^{2} (280/sq mi)
- Time zone: UTC+7 (ICT)
- Postal code: 62000
- Geocode: 6201

Mueang Kamphaeng Phet (Thai: เมืองกำแพงเพชร, pronounced [mɯ̄a̯ŋ kām.pʰɛ̄ːŋ pʰét]) is the capital district (amphoe mueang) of Kamphaeng Phet province, central Thailand.

== Geography ==
Neighboring districts are (from the northwest clockwise) Kosamphi Nakhon, Phran Kratai, Sai Ngam, Khlong Khlung, Khlong Lan of Kamphaeng Phet Province and Wang Chao of Tak province.

== History ==
In 1917 the district was renamed Mueang Kamphaeng Phet.

== Administration ==
=== Central administration ===
The district Mueang Kamphaeng Phet is divided into 16 sub-districts (tambons), which are further subdivided into 220 administrative villages (mubans).

No.	Name	Thai	Villages	Pop.
1.	Nai Mueang	ในเมือง	-	29,191
2.	Trai Trueng	ไตรตรึงษ์	15	15,095
3.	Ang Thong	อ่างทอง	21	18,106
4.	Na Bo Kham	นาบ่อคำ	22	20,074
5.	Nakhon Chum	นครชุม	13	17,475
6.	Song Tham	ทรงธรรม	12	7,552
7.	Lan Dokmai	ลานดอกไม้	11	6,931
10.	Nong Pling	หนองปลิง	11	12,338
11.	Khonthi	คณฑี	13	9,747
12.	Nikhom Thung Pho Thale	นิคมทุ่งโพธิ์ทะเล	16	9,378
13.	Thep Nakhon	เทพนคร	22	20,369
14.	Wang Thong	วังทอง	21	10,819
15.	Tha Khun Ram	ท่าขุนราม	13	9,065
17.	Khlong Mae Lai	คลองแม่ลาย	10	7,435
18.	Thammarong	ธำมรงค์	8	4,454
19.	Sa Kaeo	สระแก้ว	12	15,199

Missing numbers are the tambon which now form Kosamphi Nakhon District.

=== Local administration ===
There are three towns (thesaban mueangs) in the district:

- Kamphaeng Phet (Thai: เทศบาลเมืองกำแพงเพชร) consisting of sub-district Nai Mueang.
- Nong Pling (Thai: เทศบาลเมืองหนองปลิง) consisting of sub-district Nong Pling.
- Sa Kaeo (Thai: เทศบาลเมืองสระแก้ว) consisting of sub-district Sa Kaeo.

There are five sub-district municipalities (thesaban tambons) in the district:

- Khlong Mae Lai (Thai: เทศบาลตำบลคลองแม่ลาย) consisting of parts of sub-districts Ang Thong, Khlong Mae Lai.
- Nakhon Chum (Thai: เทศบาลตำบลนครชุม) consisting of parts of sub-district Nakhon Chum.
- Pak Dong (Thai: เทศบาลตำบลปากดง) consisting of parts of sub-district Trai Trueng.
- Thep Nakhon (Thai: เทศบาลตำบลเทพนคร) consisting of sub-district Thep Nakhon.
- Nikhom Thung Pho Thale (Thai: เทศบาลตำบลนิคมทุ่งโพธิ์ทะเล) consisting of sub-district Nikhom Thung Pho Thale.

There are 11 sub-district administrative organizations (SAO) in the district:

- Trai Trueng (Thai: องค์การบริหารส่วนตำบลไตรตรึงษ์) consisting of parts of sub-district Trai Trueng.
- Ang Thong (Thai: องค์การบริหารส่วนตำบลอ่างทอง) consisting of parts of sub-district Ang Thong.
- Na Bo Kham (Thai: องค์การบริหารส่วนตำบลนาบ่อคำ) consisting of sub-district Na Bo Kham.
- Nakhon Chum (Thai: องค์การบริหารส่วนตำบลนครชุม) consisting of parts of sub-district Nakhon Chum.
- Song Tham (Thai: องค์การบริหารส่วนตำบลทรงธรรม) consisting of sub-district Song Tham.
- Lan Dokmai (Thai: องค์การบริหารส่วนตำบลลานดอกไม้) consisting of sub-district Lan Dokmai.
- Khonthi (Thai: องค์การบริหารส่วนตำบลคณฑี) consisting of sub-district Khonthi.
- Wang Thong (Thai: องค์การบริหารส่วนตำบลวังทอง) consisting of sub-district Wang Thong.
- Tha Khun Ram (Thai: องค์การบริหารส่วนตำบลท่าขุนราม) consisting of sub-district Tha Khun Ram.
- Khlong Mae Lai (Thai: องค์การบริหารส่วนตำบลคลองแม่ลาย) consisting of parts of sub-district Khlong Mae Lai.
- Thammarong (Thai: องค์การบริหารส่วนตำบลธำมรงค์) consisting of sub-district Thammarong.

== See also ==
- Kamphaeng Phet province
