= Khlong Saduang Yai =

Watercourse in Thailand

Khlong Saduang Yai (Thai: คลองสะดวงใหญ่, pronounced [kʰlɔ̄ːŋ sā.dūa̯ŋ jàj]) is a watercourse of Thailand. It is a tributary of the Pa Sak River, part of the Chao Phraya River basin.
