= Khlong Tron =

Watercourse in Thailand

Coordinates: 17°26′N 100°08′E

The Khlong Tron (Thai: คลองตรอน, pronounced [kʰlɔ̄ːŋ trɔ̄ːn]) is a watercourse of Thailand and part of the Chao Phraya River basin. It joins the Nan River in Uttaradit Province. Khlong Tron is located in Ton Sak Yai National Park (known as Khlong Tron National Park until 2003).
