= Huai Nam Chun =

Watercourse in Phechaboon Province, Thailand

Huai Nam Chun (Thai: ห้วยน้ำชุน, pronounced [hûa̯j náːm t͡ɕʰūn]) is a watercourse in Phechaboon Province, Thailand. It is a tributary of the Pasak River, part of the Chao praya River basin.
