= Lan Krabue district =

Lan Krabue ลานกระบือ
- District
- District location in Kamphaeng Phet province
- Coordinates: 16°36′2″N 99°50′57″E
- Country: Thailand
- Province: Kamphaeng Phet
- Seat: Lan Krabue

Area
  - Total: 359.1 km^{2} (138.6 sq mi)

Population (2005)
  - Total: 41,297
  - Density: 115/km^{2} (300/sq mi)
- Time zone: UTC+7 (ICT)
- Postal code: 62170
- Geocode: 6207

Lan Krabue (Thai: ลานกระบือ, pronounced [lāːn krā.bɯ̄ː]) is the northeasternmost district (amphoe) of Kamphaeng Phet province, central Thailand.

== History ==
In the past the district area was covered by dense forests. Many wild animals visited salt lick areas inside, especially water buffalo (Bubalus bubalis). Thus the people called their village Ban Lan Khwai (Kwai 'buffalo'). Later more people moved to establish their new estate in the area, then the government upgraded the village to be Tambon Lan Krabue of Phran Kratai district. It was made a minor district (king amphoe) on 16 June 1977, when the two tambons Lan Krabue and Chong Lom were split off from Phran Kratai. It was upgraded to a full district on 16 July 1984.

== Geography ==
Neighboring districts are (from the south clockwise): Sai Ngam, Phran Kratai of Kamphaeng Phet Province, Khiri Mat of Sukhothai province, Bang Rakam of Phitsanulok province and Wachirabarami of Phichit province.

== Administration ==
The district is divided into seven subdistricts (tambons), which are further subdivided into 67 villages (mubans). There are two townships (thesaban tambons): Lan Krabue covers parts of tambons Lan Krabue and Non Phluang, and Cong Lom the whole same-named tambon. There are a further seven tambon administrative organizations (TAO).

| No. | Name | Thai name | Villages | Pop. |
|---|---|---|---|---|
| 1. | Lan Krabue | ลานกระบือ | 11 | 7,633 |
| 2. | Chong Lom | ช่องลม | 8 | 5,536 |
| 3. | Nong Luang | หนองหลวง | 14 | 8,994 |
| 4. | Non Phluang | โนนพลวง | 8 | 4,414 |
| 5. | Pracha Suk San | ประชาสุขสันต์ | 10 | 7,666 |
| 6. | Bueng Thap Raet | บึงทับแรต | 8 | 3,123 |
| 7. | Chanthima | จันทิมา | 8 | 3,931 |

== Oil field ==
Lan Krabue is famous for being the largest oil field in the country, "Sirikit Oil Field" (NMM-Cx).

It was discovered by Thai Shell Exploration & Production Co., Ltd. from the end of 1981 to the present. It still holds the record as the largest onshore crude oil source in Thailand. It is currently owned by PTT.
