= Khlong Wang Chomphu =

Watercourse in Thailand

Khlong Wang Chomphu (Thai: คลองวังชมภู, pronounced [kʰlɔ̄ːŋ wāŋ t͡ɕʰōm.pʰūː]) is a watercourse in Phetchabun Province, Thailand. It is a tributary of the Pa Sak River, part of the Chao Phraya River basin.
