= Huai Mae Phuak (Yom tributary) =

Watercourse in Thailand

The Huai Mae Phuak (Thai: ห้วยแม่พวก, pronounced [hûa̯j mɛ̂ː pʰûa̯k]) is a watercourse of Thailand. It is a tributary of the Yom River, part of the Chao Phraya River basin.
