= Lam Phaya Klang =

River in Thailand

Coordinates: 15°14′03″N 101°22′25″E

Lam Phaya Klang (Thai: ลำพญากลาง, pronounced [lām pʰā.jāː klāːŋ]) is a river of Thailand. It is a tributary of the Pa Sak River, part of the Chao Phraya River basin.
