= Nam Hao =

Watercourse in China

Coordinates: 19°05′N 100°51′E

The Nam Hao (Thai: น้ำฮาว, pronounced [náːm hāːw]) or Huai Nam Hao (ห้วยน้ำฮาว) is a watercourse of Thailand. It is a tributary of the Nan River, which it joins near Ban Aham in Nan Province.

An ancient castle moat in Nantong, China is also referred to as the Hao River.
