= Tha Chin River =

Distributary of the Chao Phraya River

Coordinates: 15°13′33″N 100°04′44″E

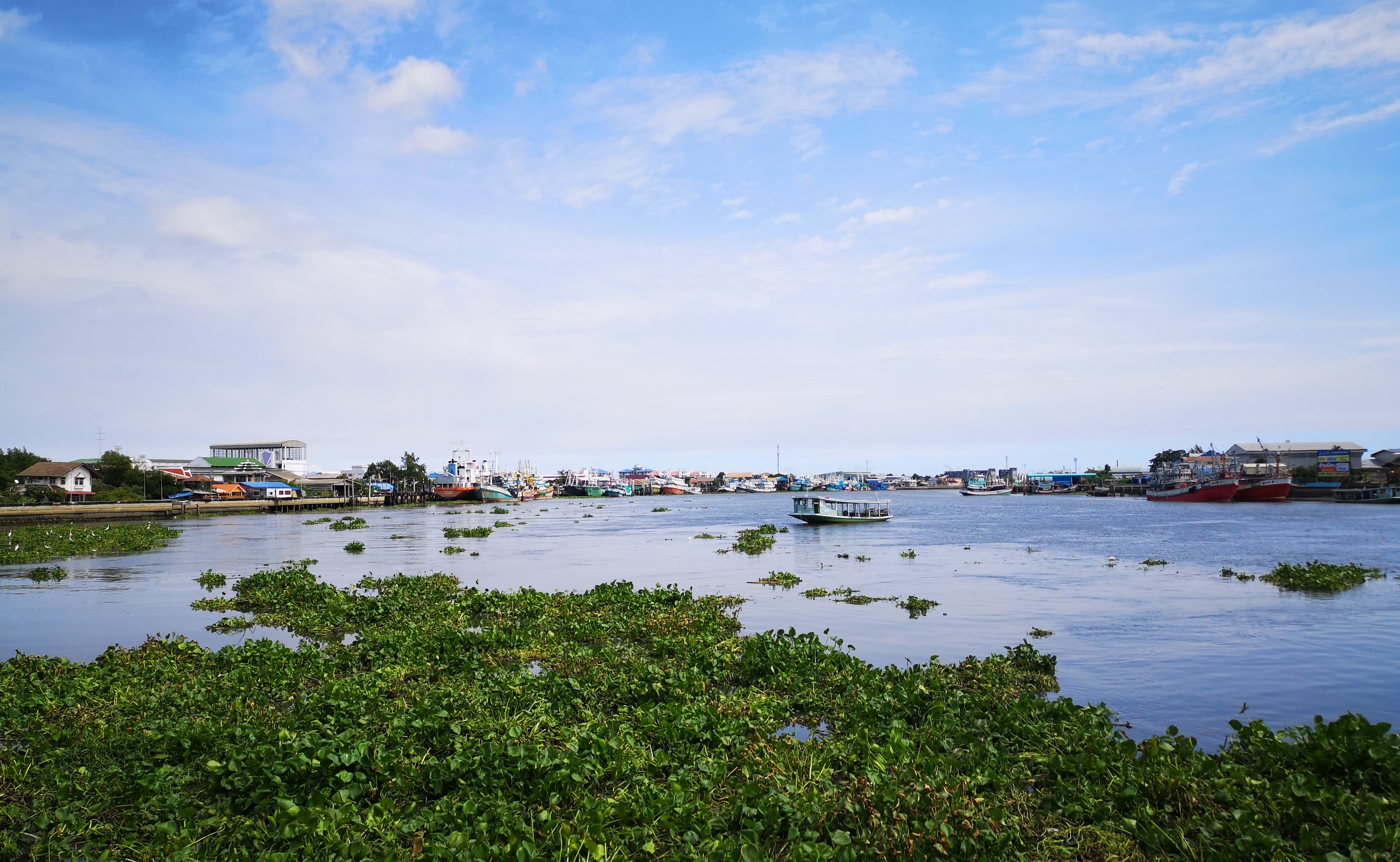
Tha Chin River in the area of Tha Chalom, Samut Sakhon, where it empties into the Gulf of Thailand

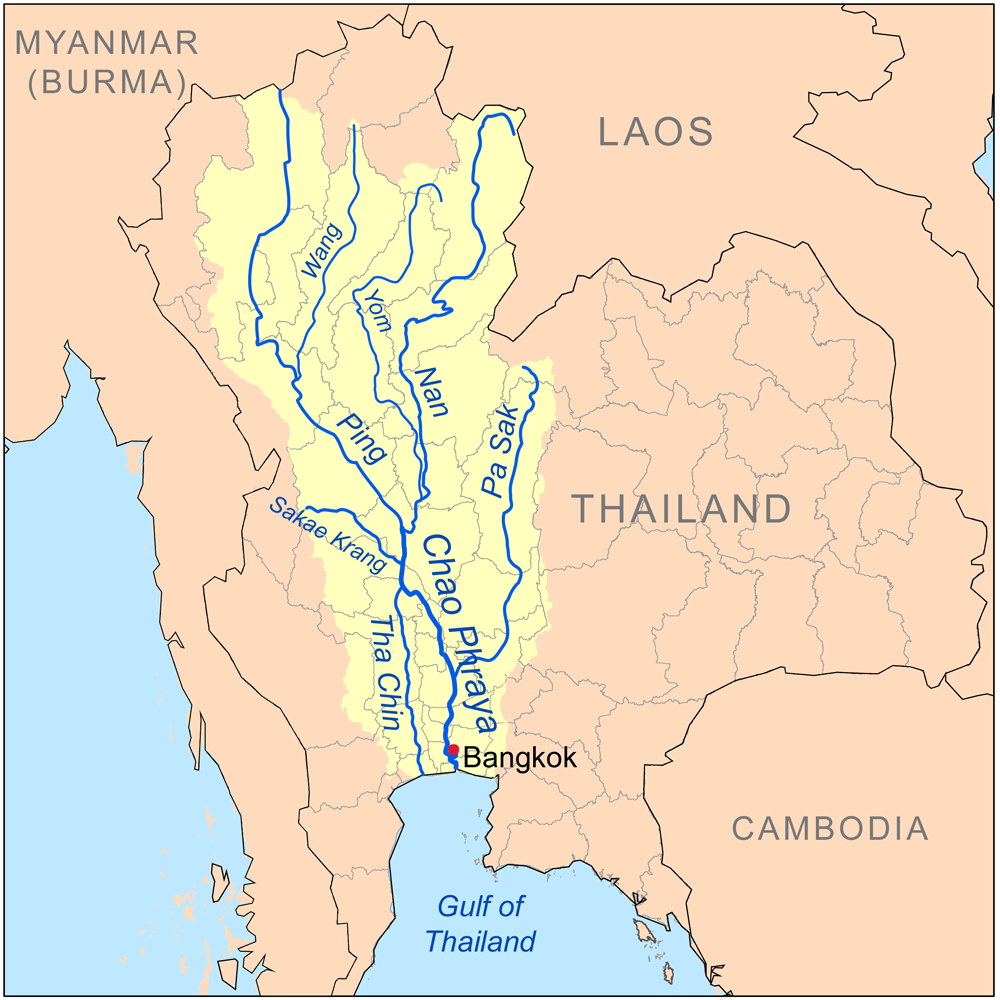
Map of the Chao Phraya River drainage basin showing the Tha Chin River

The Tha Chin River (Thai: แม่น้ำท่าจีน, RTGS: Maenam Tha Chin, pronounced [mɛ̂ːnáːm tʰâː tɕīːn]) is a distributary of the Chao Phraya River, in Thailand. It splits in the province of Chai Nat and then flows west from the Chao Phraya through the central plains, until it empties into the Gulf of Thailand in Samut Sakhon province.

== Regional names ==
The Tha Chin river has many regional names. After it splits from Chao Phraya River at Chai Nat, it is called Makham Thao River or Khlong Makham Thao; while passing Suphan Buri it is the Suphan River; while passing Nakhon Pathom it becomes the Nakhon Chai Si River. Only near its mouth at Samut Sakhon does it become the Tha Chin River, named after the former name of Samut Sakhon. The name Tha Chin is the convention used in most scientific documents.

The name "Tha Chin" literally means "Chinese pier". More than a thousand years ago, the area where the river now flows, in what is today Samut Sakhon province, was home to a large Chinese community. Their descendants still live there today. For this reason, the area is also known in the Teochew dialect as "Leng Kia Chu" (Chinese: 龍仔厝; pinyin: lóng zǐ cuò), which means "home of the descendants of the dragon".

== Tributaries ==
Tributaries of the Tha Chin include Huai Krasiao, Huai Mae Thawip, Khlong Chorakhe Sam Phan, and Khlong Bang Len.

== Tha Chin basin ==
The Tha Chin drains a total area of 13,681 square kilometers (5,282 sq mi). The Tha Chin Basin is part of the Chao Phraya Watershed.

== Passenger boats of the river ==
In the past, passenger boats used to run back and forth along the Tha Chin river, from Suphan Buri to Tha Tian pier in Bangkok. Occasionally, passengers would disembark at Wat Ngiu Rai railway station to continue their journey to Bangkok by train. The passenger boat service was operated by a private company, the Suphan Steam Packet Company.

Later, as land transportation developed and became more convenient, water travel declined. As a result, the passenger boat service on the Tha Chin river came to an end in the early 1960s.

== Health of the river ==
The Thai Pollution Control Department (PCD) has reported that the water quality of rivers flowing into the upper Gulf of Thailand has seriously deteriorated in the past decade. The department found the Tha Chin estuary contains bacteria and nutrient pollution from phosphates, phosphorus, and nitrogen. Nutrient pollution causes algae to grow faster than ecosystems can handle, harming water quality, food resources for aquatic animals, and marine habitats. It also decreases the oxygen that fish need to survive. PCD rated water quality in the river in 2015 as "poor". The PCD findings indicated large amounts of wastewater were discharged into the river from households, industry, and agriculture.
