= Huai Krasiao =

River in Thailand

Coordinates: 14°51′N 100°00′E

Huai Krasiao (Thai: ห้วยกระเสียว, pronounced [hûa̯j krā.sǐa̯w]) or Khlong Krasiao (คลองกระเสียว, pronounced [kʰlɔ̄ːŋ krā.sǐa̯w]) is a watercourse in the provinces of Uthai Thani and Suphan Buri in Thailand. It is a tributary of the Tha Chin River.
