= Lam Nam Yang =

Watercourse in Thailand

Coordinates: 15°48′N 104°00′E

Lam Nam Yang (Thai: ลำน้ำยัง, pronounced [lām náːm jāŋ]; Northeastern Thai: ลำน้ำยัง, pronounced [la᷇m nâːm ɲa᷇ŋ]) is a watercourse of Thailand. It is a tributary of the Chi River.
