= Nan River =

Major tributary of the Chao Phraya River

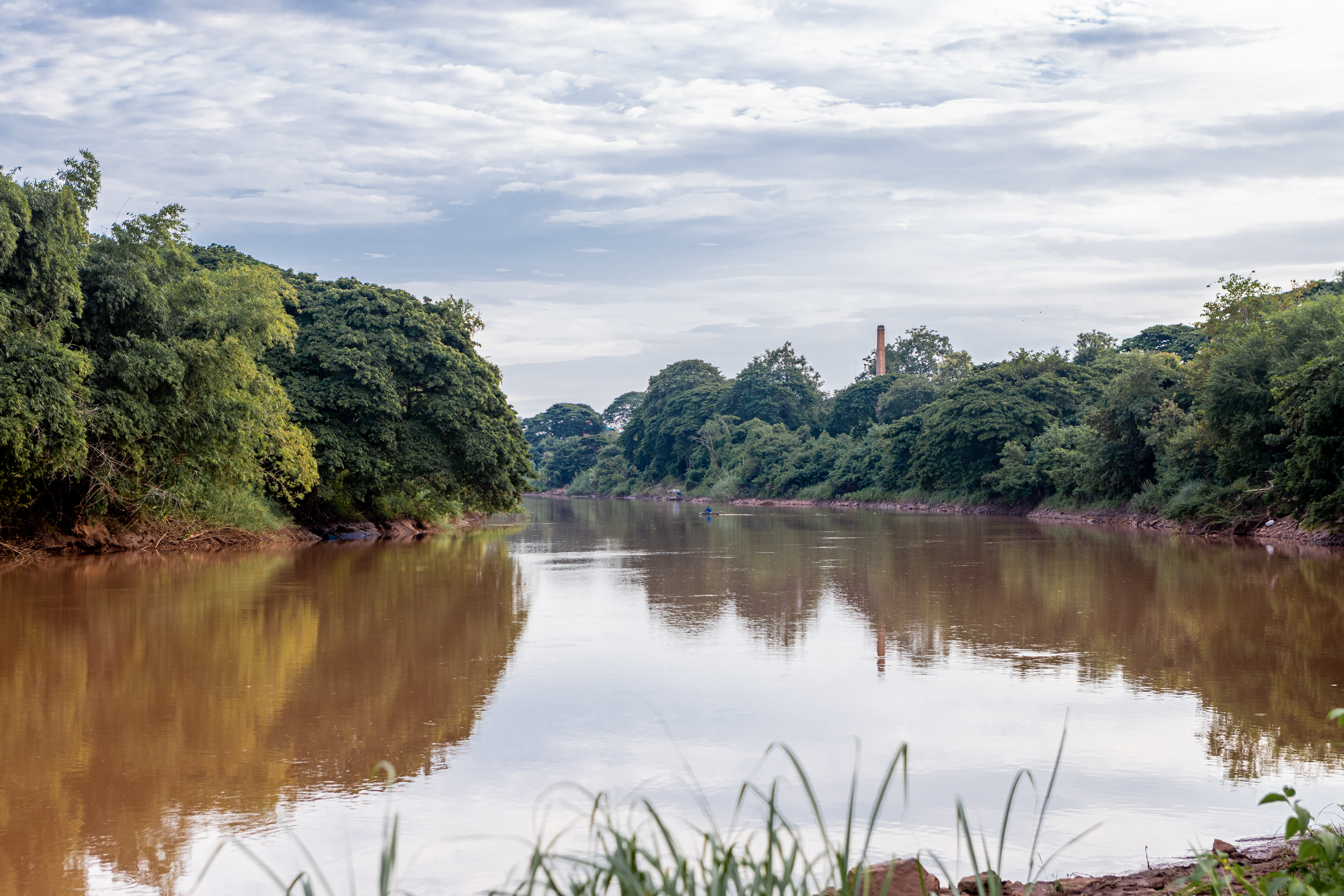
- Nan River at Mueang Uttaradit District, Uttaradit Province

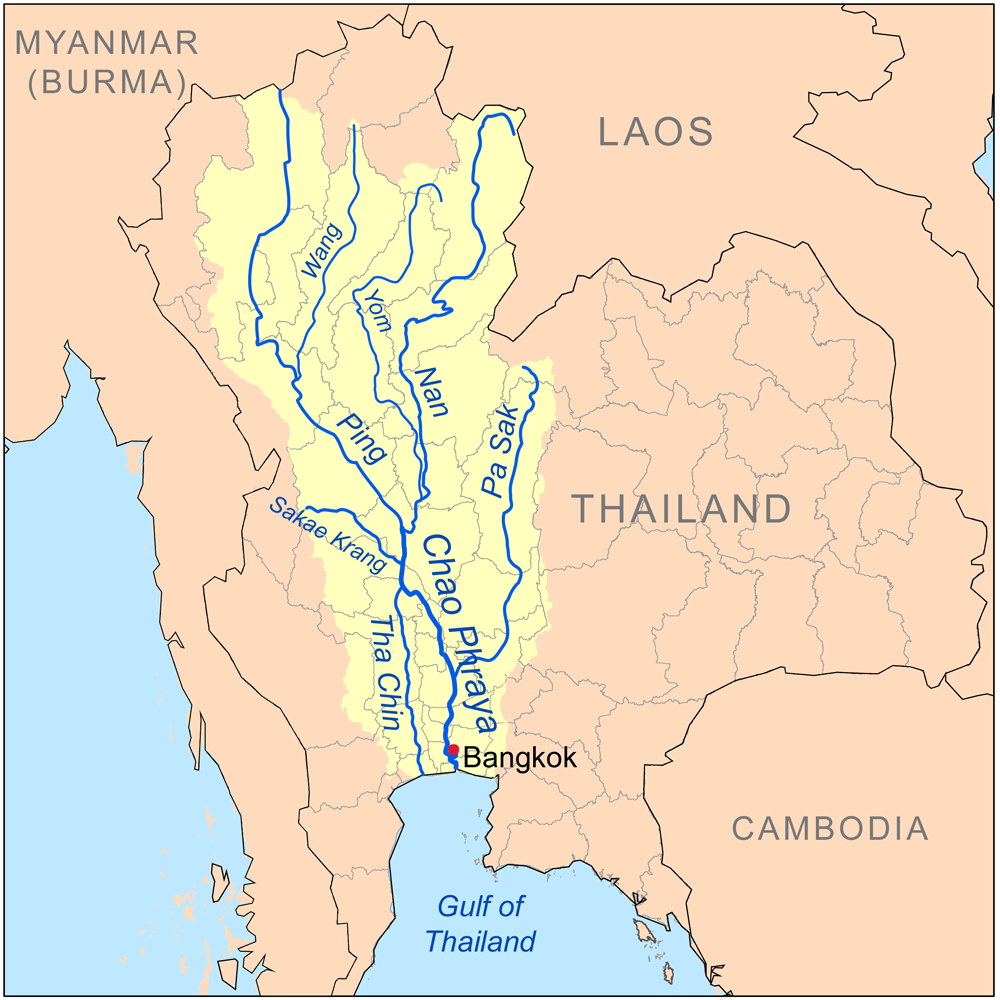
- Map of the Chao Phraya River drainage basin showing the Nan River

Location
- Country: Thailand
- Cities: Nan, Uttaradit, Phitsanulok, Phichit, Nakhon Sawan

Physical characteristics
- Source: Luang Prabang Range
  - location: Bo Kluea District, Nan Province
  - coordinates: 19°20′0″N 101°12′0″E
  - elevation: 1,240 m (4,070 ft)
- Mouth: Chao Phraya
  - location: Pak Nam Pho, Nakhon Sawan
  - coordinates: 15°42′04″N 100°08′31″E
  - elevation: 25 m (82 ft)
- Length: 740 km (460 mi)
- Basin size: 57,947 km^{2} (22,373 sq mi)
- Discharge
  - location: Nakhon Sawan
  - average: 472 m^{3}/s (16,700 cu ft/s)
  - maximum: 1,522 m^{3}/s (53,700 cu ft/s)

Basin features
- Tributaries
  - left: Lam Wa, Nam Pat, Khwae Noi River, Wang Thong River
  - right: Yom River

The Nan River (Thai: แม่น้ำน่าน, RTGS: Maenam Nan, pronounced [mɛ̂ː.náːm nâːn]; Northern Thai: ᨶᩣᩴ᩶ᩯᨾ᩵ᨶᩣ᩠᩵ᨶ, pronounced [náːm mɛ̂ː nâːn]) is a river in Thailand. It is one of the most important tributaries of the Chao Phraya River.

== Geography ==
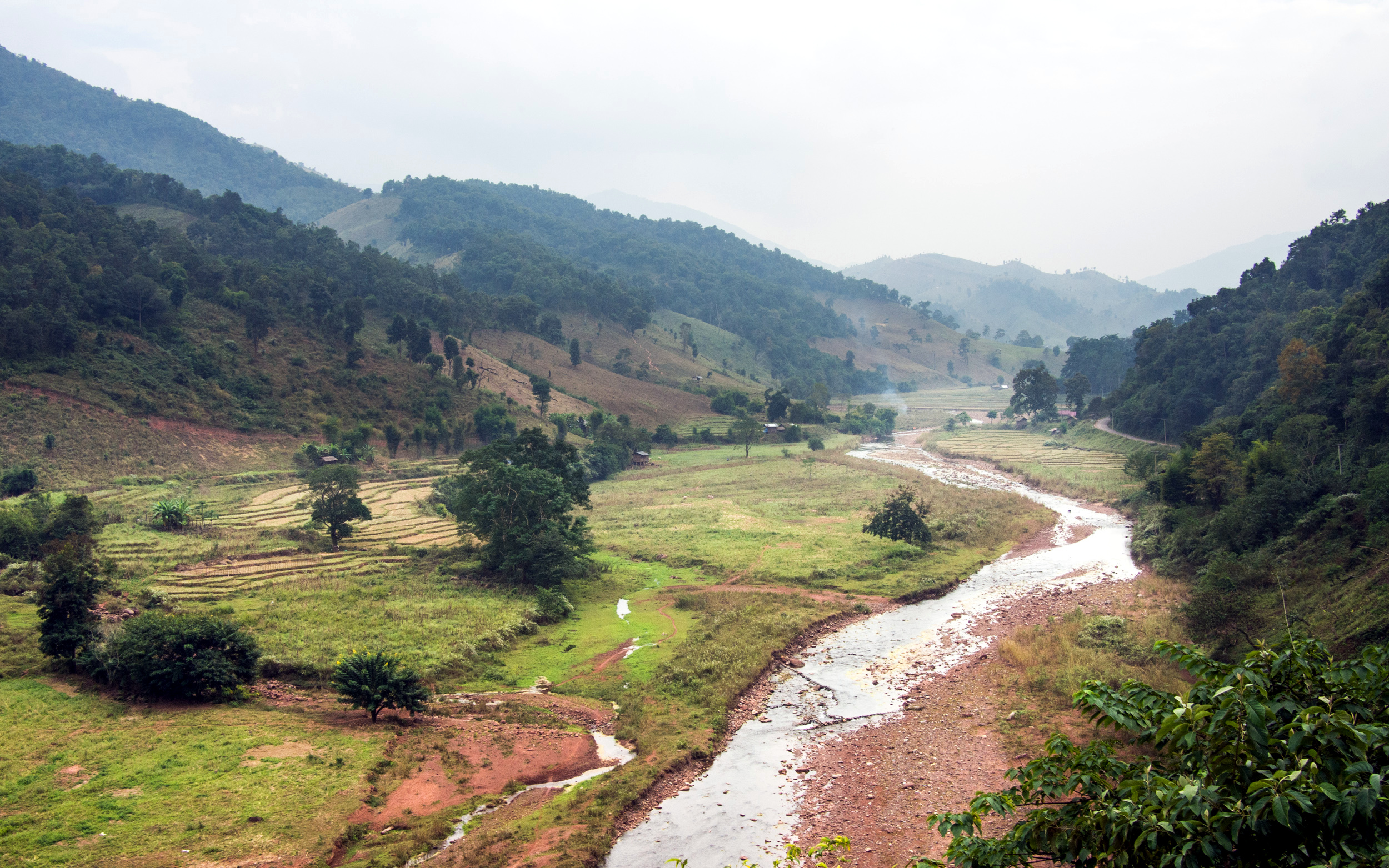
The Nan River in Chaloem Phra Kiat District, Nan, very near to its source in Bo Kluea District

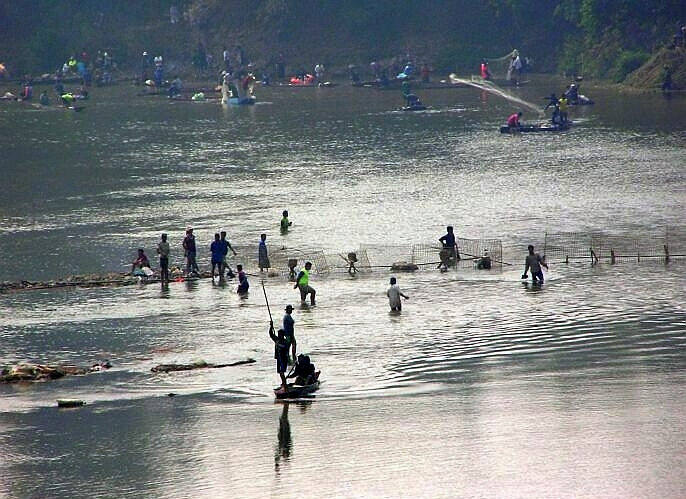
A whole community out fishing in the Nan River on a Sunday, Nan Province, Thailand

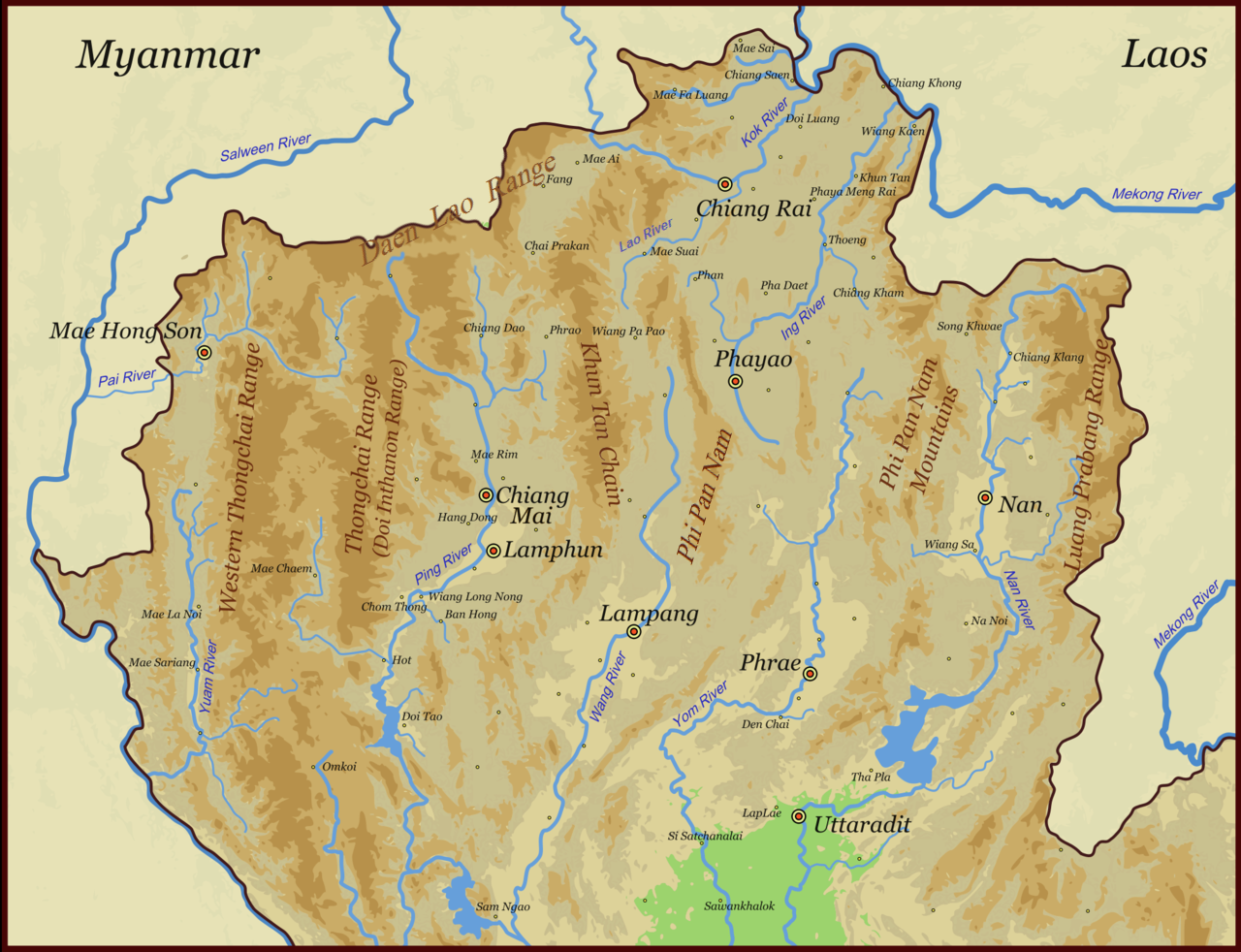
Map of the Thai highlands showing the Nan River and the Sirikit Dam

The Nan River originates in the Luang Prabang Range, Nan Province. The provinces along the river after Nan Province are Uttaradit, Phitsanulok and Phichit. The Yom River joins the Nan at Chum Saeng District, Nakhon Sawan Province. When the Nan river joins together with the Ping River at Pak Nam Pho within the town Nakhon Sawan it becomes the Chao Phraya River. The Nan river runs about 630 kilometres (390 mi) south.

=== Tributaries ===
The chief tributary of the Nan is the Yom River, which joins the Nan in Chum Saeng District in Nakhon Sawan Province. Other direct tributaries include Khlong Butsabong and Khlong San Thao of the lower Nan Basin, the Wat Ta Yom and Wang Thong Rivers which join the Nan within Phichit Province, the Khwae Noi River which joins the Nan within Phitsanulok Province, the Khlong Tron and Nam Pat, which join the Nan within Uttaradit Province, and the Lam Wa, Nam Haet, Nam Pua, Nam Yao and Nam Hao, which join the Nan within Nan Province.

=== Waterfalls ===
Kaeng Luang is a waterfall on the Nan River in Nan Province.

== Drainage ==
=== Greater Nan Basin ===
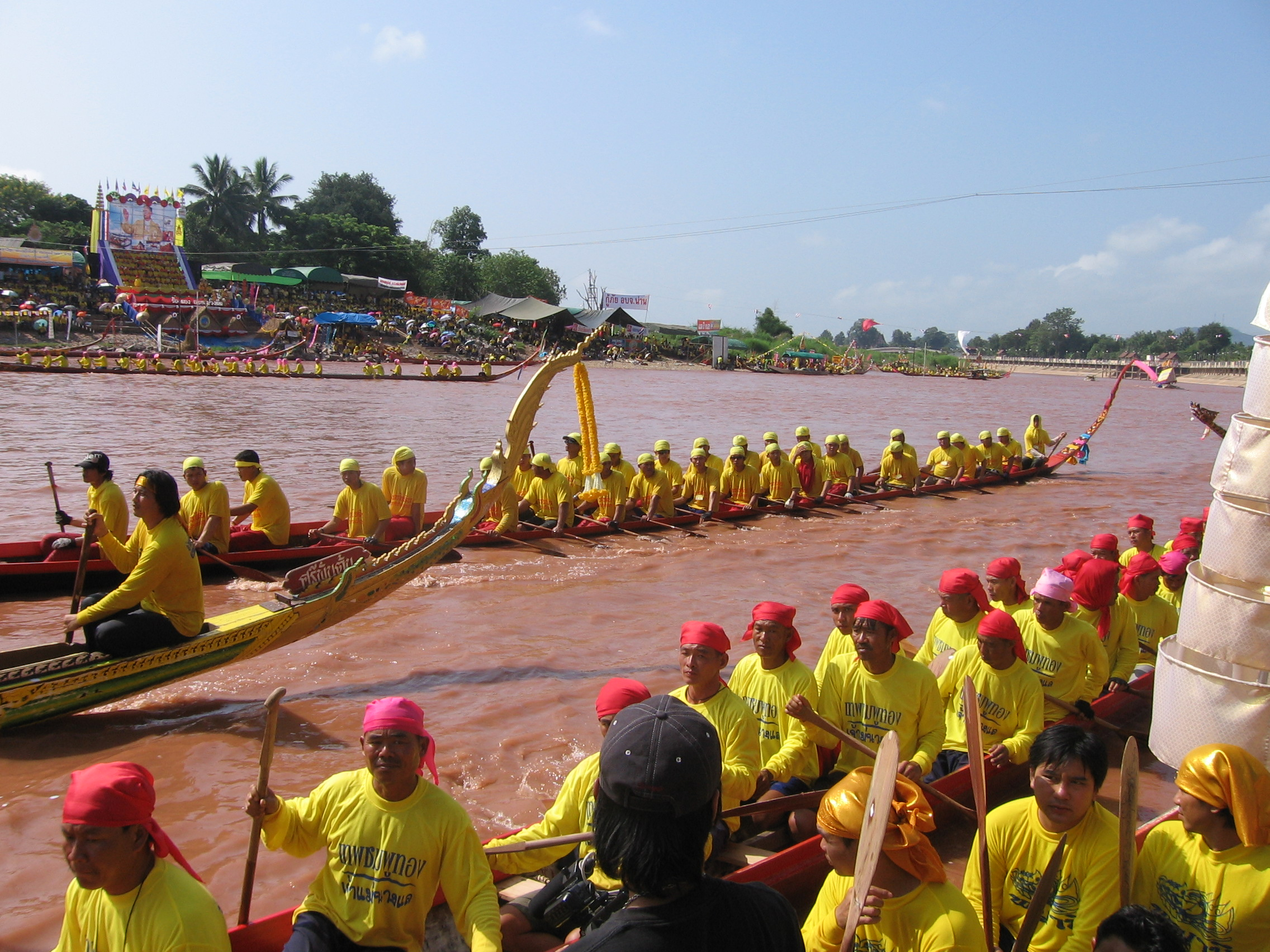
A regatta on the Nan

The expanse of the Nan River's tributaries, i.e. the Nan River System, together with the land upon which falling rain drains into these bodies of water, form the Greater Nan Drainage Basin, which is part of the Chao Phraya watershed. The total area drained by the Nan and its tributaries is 57,947 square kilometres (22,373 mi^{2}). Much of the lower basin has perfect soil for farming.

=== Nan Basin ===
Most drainage analyses, however, divide the Greater Nan Basin into the Nan Basin and the Yom River Basin. Using this convention, and subtracting the 23,616 square kilometres (9,118 mi^{2}) of land drained by the Yom and its tributaries, the Nan basin drains a total of 34,331 square kilometres (13,255 mi^{2}) of land in the provinces of Phitsanulok, Phichit, Nan and Uttaradit.

== History ==
=== Early civilizations ===
Ancient civilizations lived in the fertile land along the Nan River and its tributaries, as is evidenced by Stone Age tools unearthed near Phitsanulok. However, these early hunter-gatherers are not likely to be ancestors of the Tai who presently inhabit the Nan basin. The human population around the Chao Phraya River and its tributaries, such as the Nan, remained sparse until late in the region’s history. The settlement of the indigenous populations of the region began around the advent of rice agriculture during the Bronze Age, and continued through the Iron Age. Archaeologists suspect that Mon–Khmer speaking tribes spread through the region, bringing rice agriculture, metalworking, domestic animals. The main course of migration during the metal ages probably ran along the coast of Thailand, but migrants also travelled inland along the Chao Phraya to the Nan Basin and other areas, where it was relatively easier to establish settlements. The next major wave of migration into the Nan Basin came not from the coast along the Chao Phraya, but rather from the mountainous areas of northern Thailand. These migrants were the Tai. Their course of immigration probably began south of the Yangzi River. As the Han Chinese spread south of the Yangzi around the sixth century BC, the ancestors of the Thai retreated into the high valleys and, over many centuries, migrated west along an arc from the Guangxi to the Brahmaputra Valley. The Thai brought rice-farming expertise to the mountainous areas of Northern Thailand, and eventually to the Nan Basin and the other lowland regions of Thailand. Some of the Nan River Mon-Khmer retreated into the hills as the Thai expansion continued, while others generally adopted dialects of the Tai language and blended into the culture of the new settlers. The Tai language spoken in the area was heavily influenced by the Khmer culture as well, and evolved into the language we now call Thai, which is considerably different from other Tai dialects. Even after this Thai migration, the population in the Nan Basin, other than along the banks of the Nan River and its major tributaries, was sparse. predator animal species, as well as malaria, tropical temperatures and other hardships, kept the population from expanding far from the river, despite the region's extremely fertile soil. As the population grew during these ancient times, settlements along the Nan eventually became more urban, as populations of larger scale were better able to survive the hardships of the heavily forested region. The earliest urban developments along the Nan were modelled after the Mon-Khmer capital at Angkor in Cambodia, which was already quite advanced by the time the Nan Basin had significant population to support urban settlement. Along with the positive effects of urbanization (e.g., development of art and specialization of labor), however, came slavery, war and other societal problems associated with urban culture in the forecoming city-state period. Even in spite of urbanization along the river banks, most of the Nan Basin (aside from the river-side settlements) consisted of virgin forests until around the turn of the 20th century. One of the early river-side urban areas of the Nan emerging during the era of the Khmer Empire was Song Khwae, which over the years developed into the modern city of Phitsanulok.

=== Houseboats ===
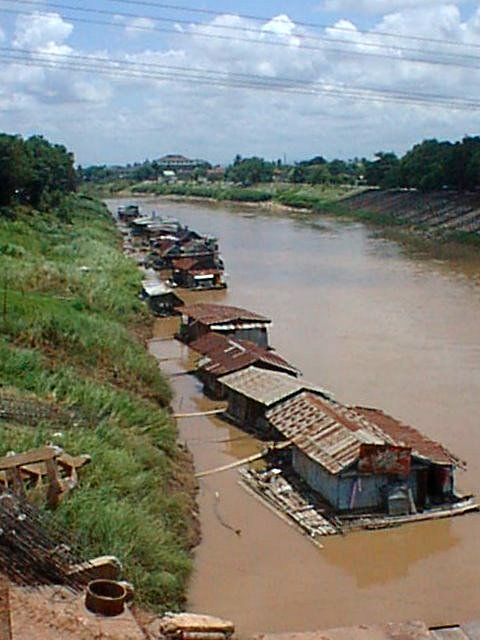
River houses in Phitsanulok

Phitsanulok is the only place in Thailand where houseboats are legal, as they have been an important aspect of regional culture since long before the drafting of modern municipal law. People of Phitsanulok still gather on houseboats and raft houses along both sides of the Nan River in the city, and adhere to a traditional way of life. There is even a floating houseboat museum along the Nan in Phitsanulok, which allows tourists to experience the Nan houseboat culture first-hand.

=== Naresuan Dam ===
The Naresuan Dam, named after King Naresuan, was constructed throughout the span of 1976 through 1985 on the Nan River in Phitsanulok Province, north of the city of Phitsanulok, as part of the Phitsanulok Irrigation Project.

== Pollution ==
Water quality in the Nan River is deteriorating from heavy bacterial contamination attributed primarily to the rapid increase of urban development in the provinces of Phitsanulok, Phichit, Nan and Uttaradit.
