= Nam Mae Lai =

Watercourse in Thailand

Location
- Country: Thailand
- Province: Phrae

Physical characteristics
- Mouth: Yom River
  - location: Ban Bun Charoen
  - coordinates: 18°13′12″N 100°11′26″E

Basin features
- River system: Chao Phraya River basin

The Nam Mae Lai (Thai: น้ำแม่หล่าย, pronounced [náːm mɛ̂ː làːj]) is a river in Phrae Province of Thailand. It is a tributary of the Yom River, part of the Chao Phraya River basin. The Nam Mae Lai flows into the Yom at 18°13′12″N 100°11′26″E, next to the village of Ban Bun Charoen.
