= Mae Mok (Yom tributary) =

Watercourse in Thailand

The Mae Mok (Thai: แม่มอก, pronounced [mɛ̂ː mɔ̂ːk]) is a watercourse in the provinces of Lampang and Sukhothai, Thailand. It is a tributary of the Yom River, part of the Chao Phraya River basin.
