= Yom River =

Coordinates: 19°23′24″N 100°27′18″E

Yom River แม่น้ำยม
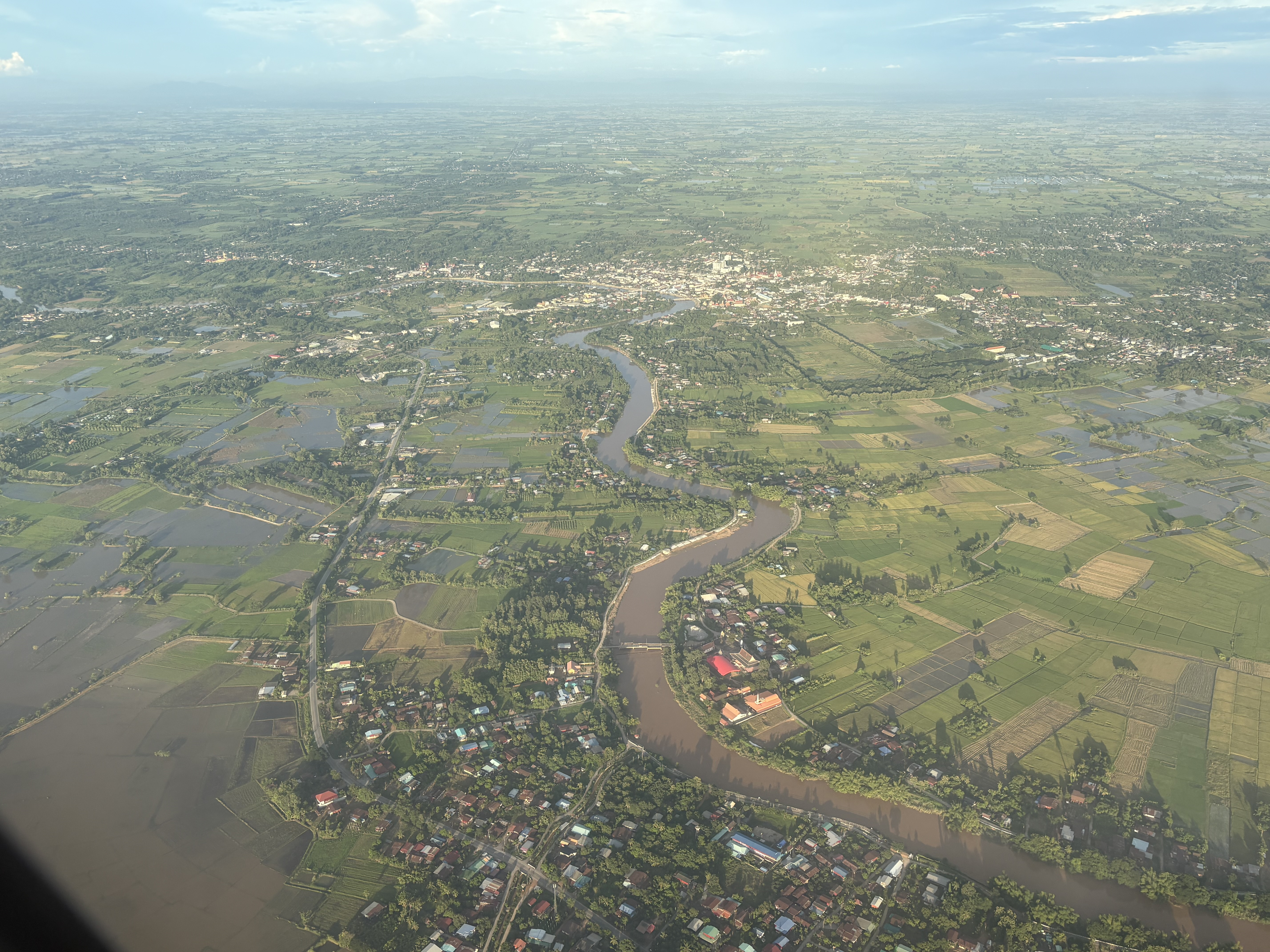
- Aerial photo of the Yom River in Si Samrong district, Sukhothai province

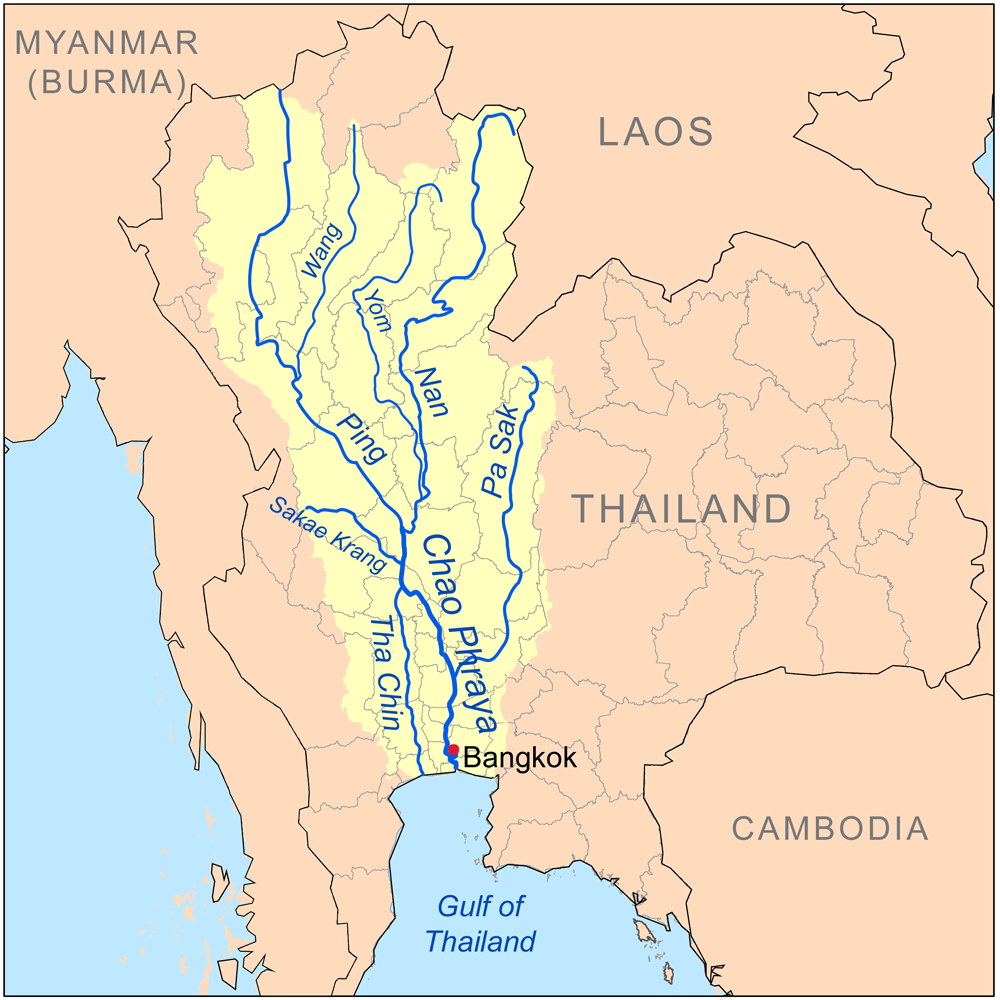
- Map of the Chao Phraya River drainage basin showing the Yom River

Location
- Country: Thailand

Physical characteristics
- Source
  - location: Bun Yuen village, Pong district, Phi Pan Nam Range, Phayao Province
  - elevation: 347 m (1,138 ft)
- Mouth: Nan River
  - location: Chum Saeng district, Nakhon Sawan province
  - elevation: 28 m (92 ft)
- Length: 700 km (430 mi)
- Basin size: 24,047 km^{2} (9,285 sq mi)
- Discharge
  - location: Nakhon Sawan
  - average: 103 m^{3}/s (3,600 cu ft/s)
  - maximum: 1,916 m^{3}/s (67,700 cu ft/s)

Basin features
- Tributaries
  - right: Ngao River

The Yom River (Thai: แม่น้ำยม, RTGS: Maenam Yom, pronounced [mɛ̂ː.náːm jōm]; Northern Thai: ᨶᩣᩴ᩶ᩯᨾ᩵ᨿᩫ᩠ᨾ, pronounced [náːm mɛ̂ː.ɲōm]) is a river in Thailand. It is the main tributary of the Nan River (which itself is a tributary of the Chao Phraya River). The Yom River has its source in the Phi Pan Nam Range in Pong District, Phayao Province. Leaving Phayao, it flows through the Phrae and Sukhothai provinces as the main water resource of both provinces before it joins the Nan River at Chum Saeng District, Nakhon Sawan Province.

== Tributaries ==
Tributaries of the Yom include the Nam Mae Phong (น้ำแม่ผง), Ngao River, Nam Ngim, Huai Mae Sin, Nam Suat (น้ำสวด), Nam Pi, Mae Mok, Huai Mae Phuak, Mae Ramphan, Nam Mae Lai, Nam Khuan, and Nam Mae Kham Mi.

== Yom Basin ==
The Yom river and its tributaries drain a total area of 24,047 square kilometres (9,285 mi^{2}) of land (called the Yom Basin) in the provinces of Sukhothai, Phitsanulok, Phichit, Phrae, and Lampang. The Yom Basin is part of the Greater Nan Basin and the Chao Phraya Watershed.

A controversial large dam was planned on the Yom River in the central area of the Phi Pan Nam mountains in Kaeng Suea Ten in 1991 but the project was later abandoned. The debate about the dam was opened again in 2011. Currently a proposal is being debated to build two smaller dams on the Yom River in the area instead of the Kaeng Suea Ten mega-dam.

== Protected areas ==
The Yom River flows through Mae Yom National Park in Phrae Province.

== Gallery ==
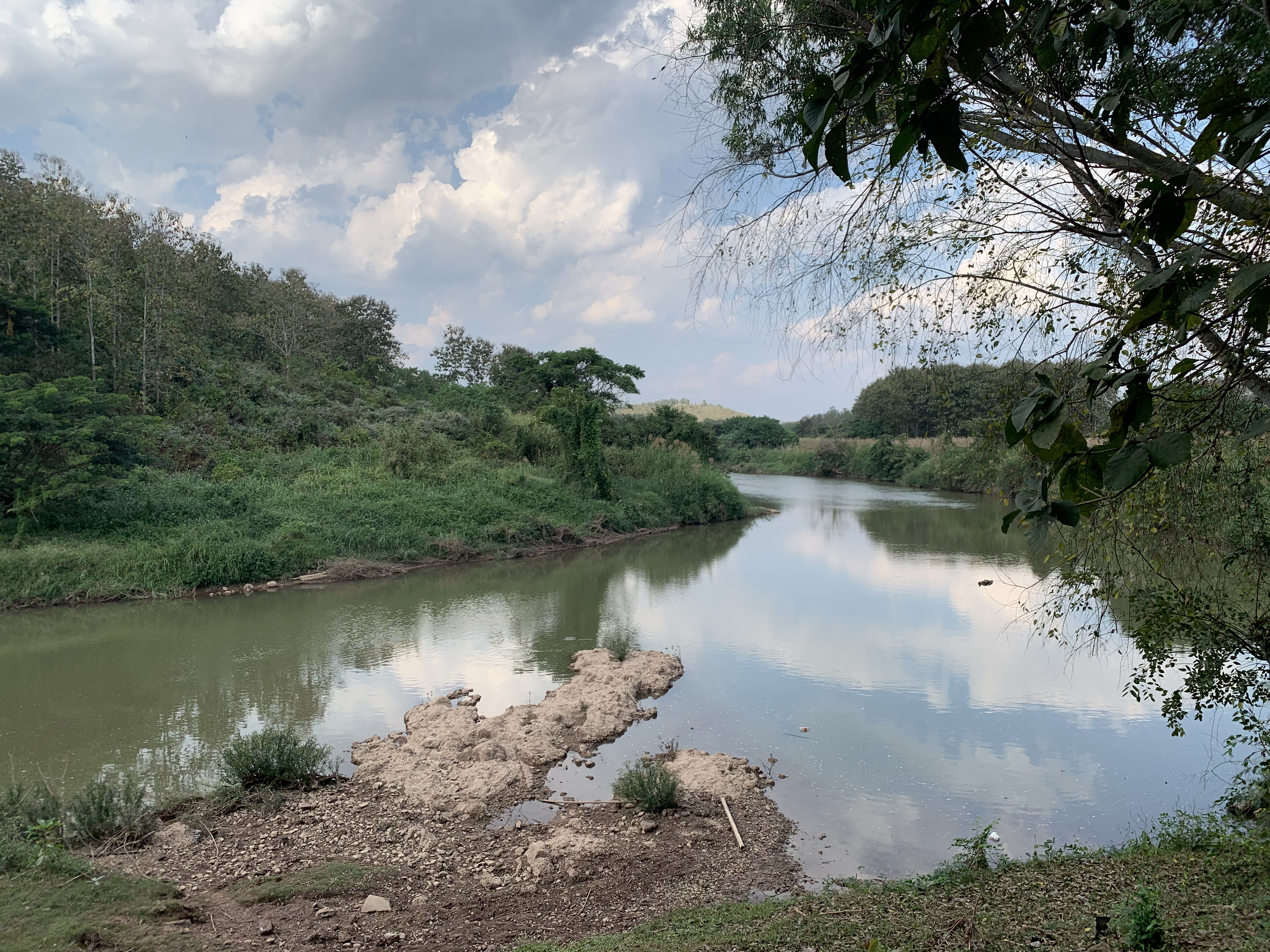
Yom River at Kaeng Luang in Doi Phu Nang National Park near Chiang Muan

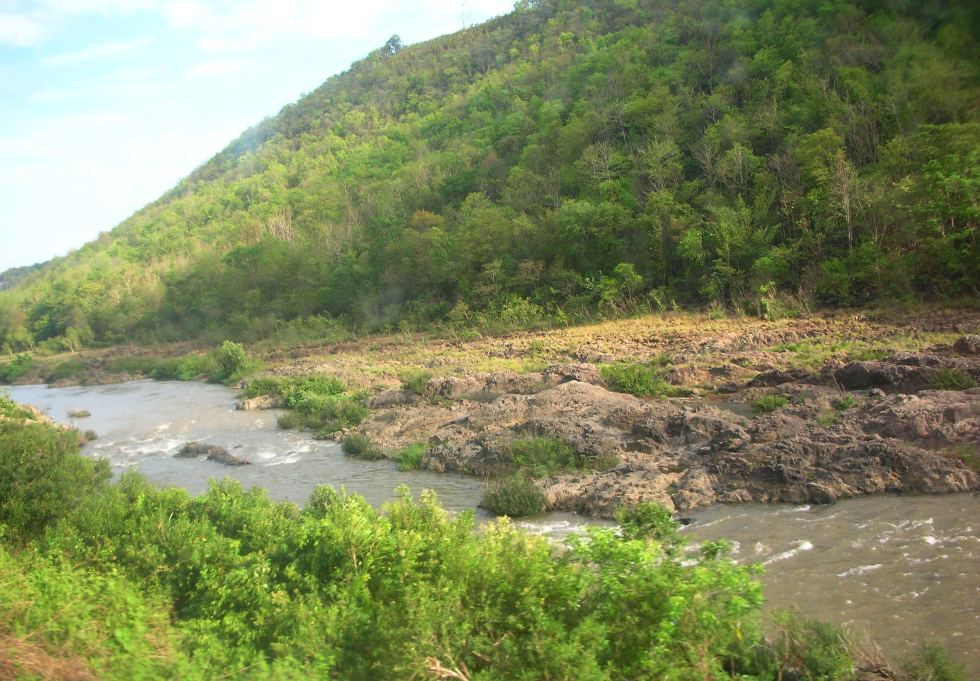
The Yom River and the Phi Pan Nam Range, Long District, Phrae Province

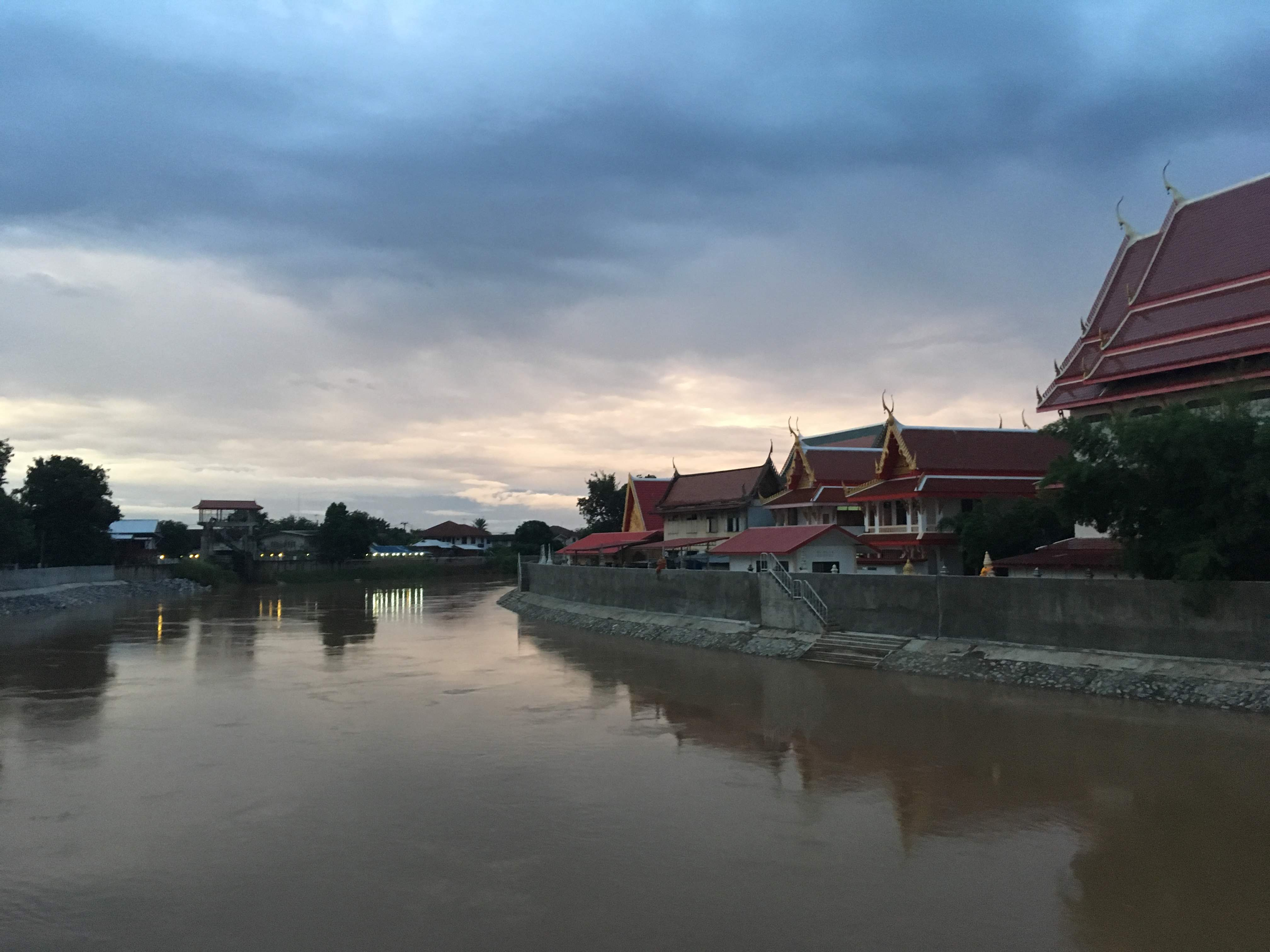
By the Wat Rachathani Temple in Sukhothai province
