= Ban Pang Ton Phueng =

Ban Pang Ton Phueng บ้านปางต้นผึ้ง
- Village
- Location within Thailand
- Coordinates: 17°48′38.6″N 100°03′55.5″E
- Country: Thailand
- Province: Uttaradit
- Amphoe: Mueang Uttaradit
- Tambon: Ban Dan Na Kham
- Named after: Honey bee tree

Government
  - Phu Yai Ban: Boontham Jinda
- Time zone: UTC+7 (Thailand)
- Postal code: 53000

Ban Pang Ton Phueng (Thai: บ้านปางต้นผึ้ง, pronounced [bâːn pāːŋ t̂n pʰɯ̂ŋ]) is a muban (village) in the area of Ban Dan Na Kham subdistrict, Mueang Uttaradit district, Uttaradit province, northern Thailand. It has been promoted as one of Uttaradit's tourist community villages.

== Toponymy ==
The name "Ban Pang Ton Phueng" literally translates to "village of lodging in the wild with honey bee trees". The first element "Ban" means "house" or "village", the second element "Pang" means "lodging in the wild", and the third element "Ton Phueng" means "honey bee tree" (Koompassia excelsa). This village has a tree of this kind larger than 18 people embracing in the backyard of the railway station. In the past, the area surrounding the village was filled with this kind of perennial plant, endowed with its location in the enclave of the valley.

== Sights ==
Ban Pang Ton Phueng is a settlement that can be reached by the northern railway line. Pang Ton Phueng railway station was built during King Rama V's reign along with the northern line. Until now, it retained its original architecture.

The highlight of the village is keeping everything traditional, for example, the railway station, is still the original one. Most of the places of interest are located along the railway tracks, including Ruangphueng Bridge ("honeycomb bridge"), also known as upside-down bridge. This is a crossing that spans the path under the railway, but the arch shape steel beams are underneath the railway, hence the name. The reason it was built this way is that the railway was built in World War II by the Japanese army to transport war weapons by train. During the construction it couldn't be built like a traditional railway with arch-shaped beams on top, lest the allies would know that it is a railway and bomb it. Therefore, they built the arch shape under the railway instead. This bridge has never been blown up, while other bridges nearby were destroyed by bombs.

Another bridge not far from the Ruangphueng Bridge is a railway bridge with the highest piers in Uttaradit. It was built across a waterway in the valley. In the rainy season, this area is filled with water and the railway must be above the water level, so it does not stop the flow of water. Anything that obstructs the water flow would cause problems for the locals. That's way it must be a railway bridge so that the water can flow underneath. In this case, the higher the safer.

Pang Tub Khob Tunnel is the shortest railway tunnel in Thailand with a length of only 120.09 m (394.0 ft), but it is the first railway tunnel of the northern route if traveling from the central region.

In addition to the historical sites of the railway line, Ban Pang Ton Phueng also has agroforestry that serves famous local fruits such as durian, longan, duku, longkong, banana etc.
