= Pang Tup Khop Tunnel =

Tunnel in Thailand

Coordinates: 17°49′29″N 100°3′2″E

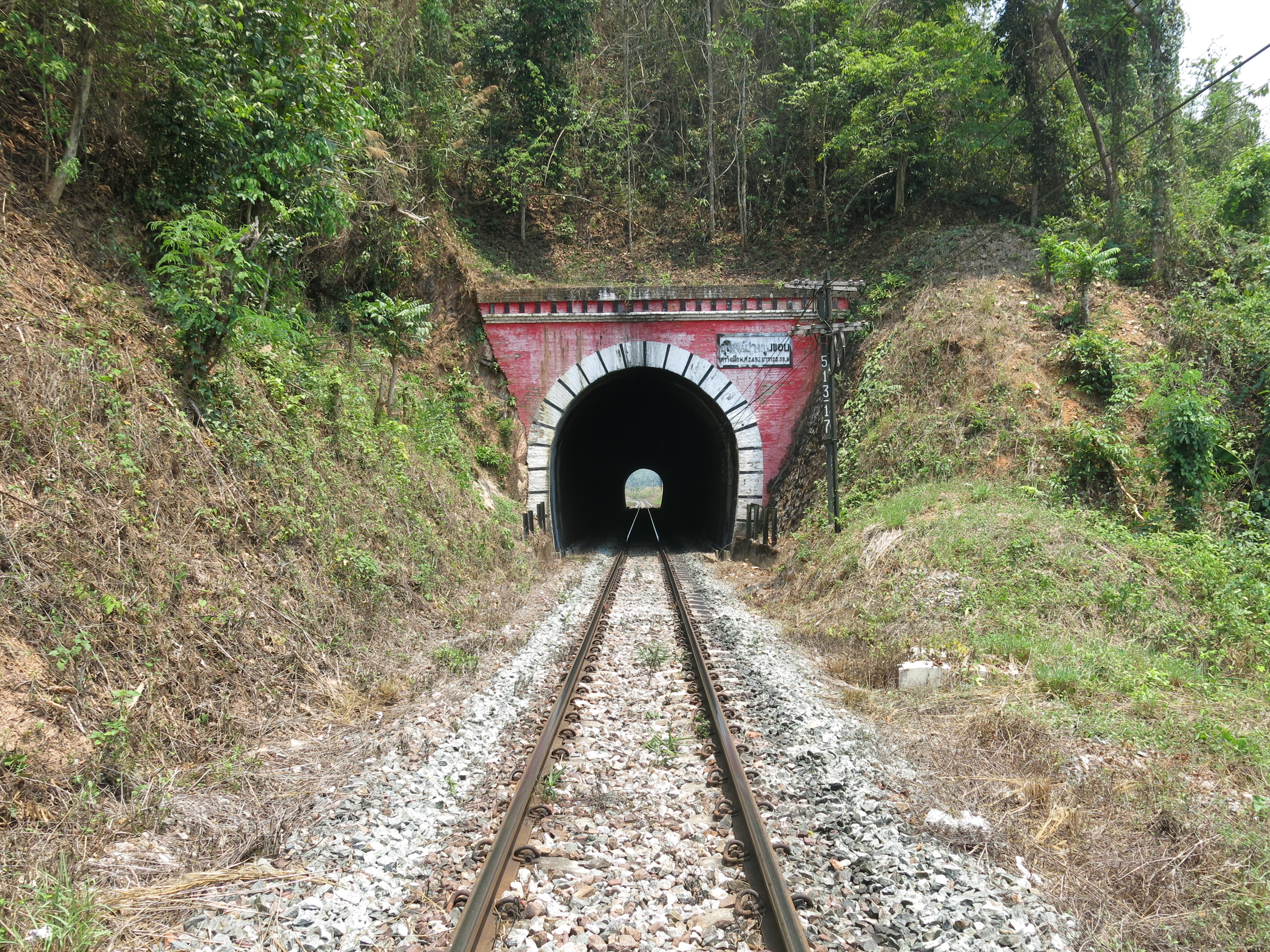
Pang Tup Khop Tunnel (northern side)

Pang Tup Khop Tunnel (Thai: อุโมงค์ปางตูบขอบ) is a railway tunnel of Thailand on the northern route. Considered another railway tunnel of northern Thailand besides the famed Khun Tan Tunnel.

Pang Tup Khop is just a short railway tunnel with a length of 120.09 m (394.0 ft), the shortest in Thailand. However, it is the first railway tunnel that all trains to the northern have to enter. It was first built in the King Rama V's reign (1902) along with the northern line, regarded as the gateway to the north.

The tunnel located in the area of Ban Pang Ton Phueng, Ban Dan Na Kham Subdistrict, Mueang Uttaradit District, Uttaradit Province between Pang Ton Phueng railway station and Khao Phlueng halt on the 513.721–513.841 km of the northern line.

Its name "Pang Tup Khop" comes from the railway workmen used to build their huts along the railway. The word "Tub" means huts and they were built along the railway or "Khob" is a vernacular. The prefix "Pang" means lodging in the wild.

The tunnel itself was made of red bricks and the telegram's wire inside it.

== See also ==
- List of railway tunnels in Thailand
