= Wat Khung Taphao =

Buddhist temple in Uttaradit province, Thailand

Coordinates: 17.6536°N 100.1403°E

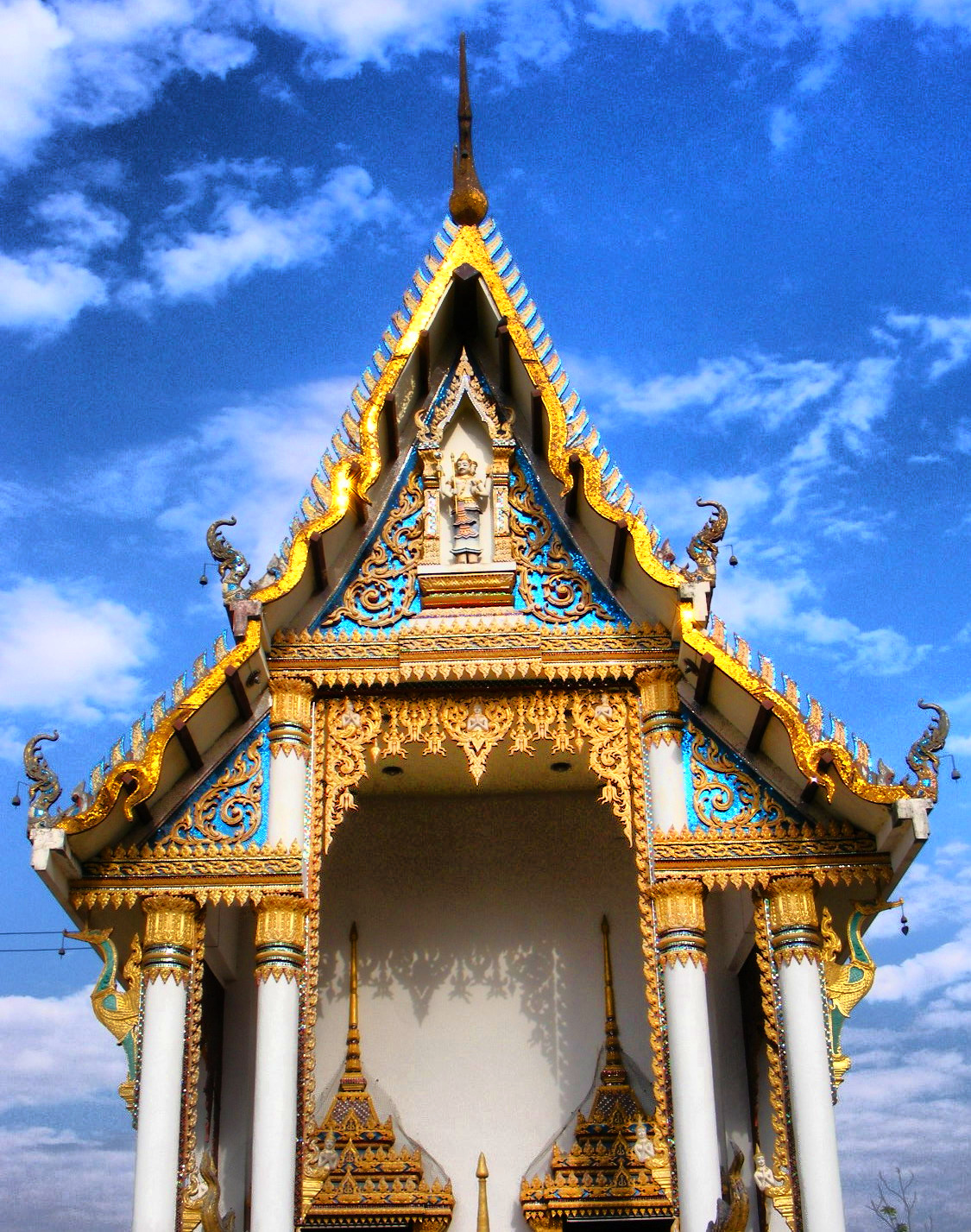
Ubosoth of Wat Khung Taphao, 2008.

Wat Khung Taphao (Thai: วัดคุ้งตะเภา, literally Temple of the bend of sailing ship watercourse) is a Buddhist temple (wat) is an ancient monastery located in Ban Khung Taphao, Mueang Uttaradit District of Uttaradit Province in Northern Thailand. It is near Khung Taphao intersection on national highway route number 11.

This temple is the oldest in Kung Taphao sub-district that include Buddha's relics and two Buddha images Phra Buddha Suwannaphetar and Phra Buddha Sukosamrit. The Buddha images are two of nine of the most important Buddha image in Uttaradit.

Wat Khung Taphao was established in the era of the Thonburi Kingdom (1768–1782), and is still an important active temple in the Ban Khung Taphao region.

== Management ==
This temple is under control of the Maha Nikaya, and is one of nine important local temples. In 2018, 20 monks and 3 novices work there. Most Venerable Phra Ajahn Somchai jirapunno is the leader and abbot. Venerable Dr. Phramaha Tevaprapas Makklay is the Deputy Abbot.

== History ==
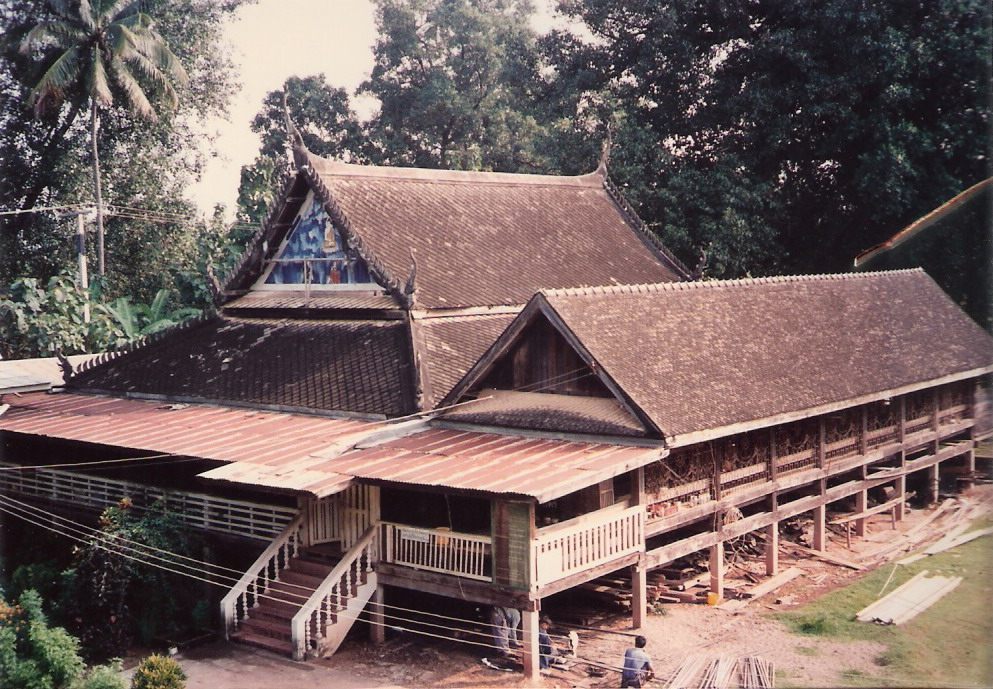
Lecture hall at the monastery is now 70 years old.

Wat Khung Taphao is an ancient temple established by King of Thonburi (Thonburi Kingdom), in year of the Tiger 1771. Buddhists arrived sometime in the early 18th century.

That year the King of Thonburi came to suppress Phra Fang faction (Chao Phra Fang Muang Sawangkaburi). After that he spent time there to organize a ministry of Buddhism. According to the Royal Chronicles of Ayutthaya (issue of Panjantanumas), Wat Khung Taphao was the only one temple in the areas of Muang Pichai and Muang Sawangkaburi to be established that year.

When government representatives came to record the names of the villages and landmarks in the area, the names for the village and temple were recorded incorrectly. The village name was changed from its original, "Ban Khung Sam Phao" to "Ban Khung Taphao", and the temple became "Wat Khung Taphao". These new names remained official.

The King of Thonburi ordered the construction of a hall for religious observances at Wat Khung Taphao as a symbol of victory of the normalcy it enjoyed during the Ayutthaya kingdom and invited ecclesiastical dignitaries from the capital to teach monks and bring them back in line with the main teachings of Buddhism.

The old hall for religious observances of Wat Khung Taphao was where were taught until the government began supplying teachers in 1922.

When the river floods, it scours under the monastery foundations. Khung Taphao villagers decided to establish a new monastery further from the river in 1929. After the new monastery was built, the river changed its course and moved away from the monastery; and this land became monastery property.

== Temple name ==
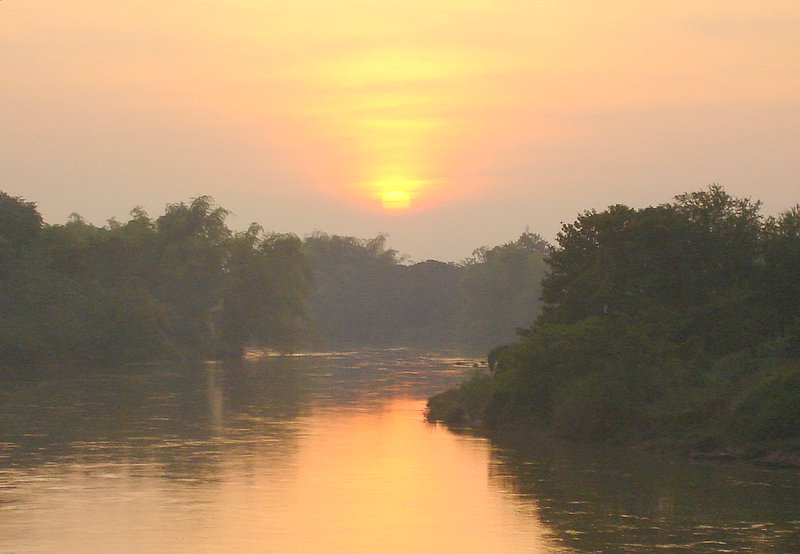
Wat Khung Taphao seen in silhouette along the river.

When King of Thonburi government representatives came to record the names of the villages and landmarks in the area, the names for the village and temple were recorded incorrectly. The village name was changed from its original, "Ban Khung Sam Phao" (Thai: บ้านคุ้งสำเภา) to "Ban Khung Taphao", and the temple became "Wat Khung Taphao". These new names have remained the official ones to the present day.

== Facilities ==
Wat Khung Taphao is the center of the community. Buddhist Sunday Education center contributed to support the community. Moreover, other organizations are located within Wat Khung Taphao and local training of Kung Taphao sub-district.

Surrounding the temple, it includes a chapel, pavilion and cubicle. Others areas were separated to become a herb garden and local museum.

An important Buddha image is called "Phra Buddha Suwannaphetar" inside the building. This building can accommodate approximately 100 people.

The main pavilion is used for religious ceremonies on festival days such as making merit, giving food to the monks and paying respect to Buddha. A Buddha image called "Phra Buddha Sukosamrit" and Buddha's relics from India are present.

On the second floor of this building is a local museum where scriptures of Buddhism and Thai Herbal Pharmacopoeia are available.

== See also ==
- List of Buddhist temples
