= Ruam Chit =

Ruam Chit ร่วมจิต
- Tambon
- Interactive map of Ruam Chit
- Coordinates: 17°42′32″N 100°20′47″E
- Country: Thailand
- Province: Uttaradit
- Amphoe: Tha Pla

Population (2018)
  - Total: 5,540
- Time zone: UTC+7 (TST)
- Postal code: 53190
- TIS 1099: 530308

Ruam Chit (Thai: ร่วมจิต) is a tambon (subdistrict) of Tha Pla District, in Uttaradit Province, Thailand. In 2018 it had a total population of 5,540 people.

== History ==
The subdistrict was created effective September 14, 1976 by splitting off 2 administrative villages from Hat Ngio.

== Administration ==
=== Central administration ===
The tambon is subdivided into 11 administrative villages (muban).

No.	Name	Thai
1.	Ban Ruam Chit	บ้านร่วมจิต
2.	Ban Sa Kaeo	บ้านสระแก้ว
3.	Ban Ruam Chai	บ้านร่วมใจ
4.	Ban Huai Hua Chang	บ้านห้วยหัวช้าง
5.	Ban Nong Po	บ้านหนองโป้
6.	Ban Nong Yara	บ้านหนองย่ารำ
7.	Ban Nong Bot	บ้านหนองโบสถ์
8.	Ban Daen Thong	บ้านแดนทอง
9.	Ban Noen Sing	บ้านเนินสิงห์
10.	Ban Rat Bamrung	บ้านราษฎร์บำรุง
11.	Ban Mai Phatthana	บ้านใหม่พัฒนา

=== Local administration ===
The area of the subdistrict is shared by 2 local governments.

- the subdistrict municipality (Thesaban Tambon) Ruam Chit (เทศบาลตำบลร่วมจิต)
- the subdistrict administrative organization (SAO) Ruam Chit (องค์การบริหารส่วนตำบลร่วมจิต)
