= Tham Chalong =

Tham Chalong ถ้ำฉลอง
- Tambon
- Country: Thailand
- Province: Uttaradit
- District: Mueang Uttaradit

Population (2015)
  - Total: 2,800
- Time zone: UTC+7 (ICT)
- Postal code: 53000
- TIS 1099: 530117

Tham Chalong (Thai: ถ้ำฉลอง, pronounced [tʰâm t͡ɕʰā.lɔ̌ːŋ]) is a tambon (sub-district) of Mueang Uttaradit District, in Uttaradit Province, Thailand. In 2015 it had a population of 2,800 people.

== History ==
The sub-district was created effective 1 August 1984 by splitting off three administrative villages from Hat Ngio.

== Administration ==
=== Central administration ===
The tambon is divided into four administrative villages (muban).

No.	Name	Thai
1.	Ban Nong Phai	บ้านหนองไผ่
2.	Ban Huai Chalong	บ้านห้วยฉลอง
3.	Ban Wang Tham	บ้านวังถ้ำ
4.	Ban Ton Tong	บ้านต้นต้อง

=== Local administration ===
The area of the sub-district is covered by the sub-district administrative organization (SAO) Tham Chalong (องค์การบริหารส่วนตำบลถ้ำฉลอง).
