= Khun Fang =

Khun Fang ขุนฝาง
- Tambon
- Country: Thailand
- Province: Uttaradit
- District: Mueang Uttaradit

Population (2015)
  - Total: 3,936
- Time zone: UTC+7 (ICT)
- Postal code: 53000
- TIS 1099: 530116

Khun Fang (Thai: ขุนฝาง, pronounced [kʰǔn fǎːŋ]) is a tambon (sub-district) of Mueang Uttaradit District, in Uttaradit Province, Thailand. In 2015 it had a population of 3,936 people.

== History ==
The sub-district was created 1 July 1983 by splitting off five administrative villages from Pha Chuk.

== Administration ==
=== Central administration ===
The tambon is divided into seven administrative villages (muban).

No.	Name	Thai
1.	Ban Lao Pa Sa	บ้านเหล่าป่าสา
2.	Ban Huai Phu Nok	บ้านห้วยภูนก
3.	Ban Lao Pa Sa	บ้านเหล่าป่าสา
4.	Ban Fang Laeng	บ้านฝางแล้ง
5.	Ban Khun Fang	บ้านขุนฝาง
6.	Ban Khun Fang	บ้านขุนฝาง
7.	Ban Pang Wua	บ้านปางวัว

=== Local administration ===
The area of the sub-district is covered by the sub-district administrative organization (SAO) Khun Fang (องค์การบริหารส่วนตำบลขุนฝาง).
