= Khung Taphao =

Khung Taphao คุ้งตะเภา
- Tambon
- Interactive map of Khung Taphao
- Country: Thailand
- Province: Uttaradit
- District: Mueang Uttaradit

Population (2016)
  - Total: 8,899
- Time zone: UTC+7 (ICT)
- Postal code: 53000
- TIS 1099: 530105

Khung Taphao (Thai: คุ้งตะเภา, pronounced [kʰúŋ tā.pʰāw]) is a tambon (sub-district) of Mueang Uttaradit District, in Uttaradit Province, Thailand. In 2016 it had a population of 8,899 people.

== Administration ==
=== Central administration ===
The tambon is divided into eight administrative villages (muban).

No.	Name	Thai
1.	Ban Pa Kluai	บ้านป่ากล้วย
2.	Ban Pa Kluai	บ้านป่ากล้วย
3.	Ban Pa Khanun	บ้านป่าขนุน
4.	Ban Khung Taphao	บ้านคุ้งตะเภา
5.	Ban Hua Hat	บ้านหัวหาด
6.	Ban Hat Suea Ten	บ้านหาดเสือเต้น
7.	Ban Bo Phra	บ้านบ่อพระ
8.	Ban Hat Suea Ten	บ้านหาดเสือเต้น

=== Local administration ===
The area of the sub-district is covered by the sub-district municipality (Thesaban Tambon) Khung Taphao (เทศบาลตำบลคุ้งตะเภา).
