= Ban Dan railway station =

Railway station in Ban Dan Na Kham, Thailand

Coordinates: 17.7184°N 100.1277°E

Ban Dan บ้านด่าน
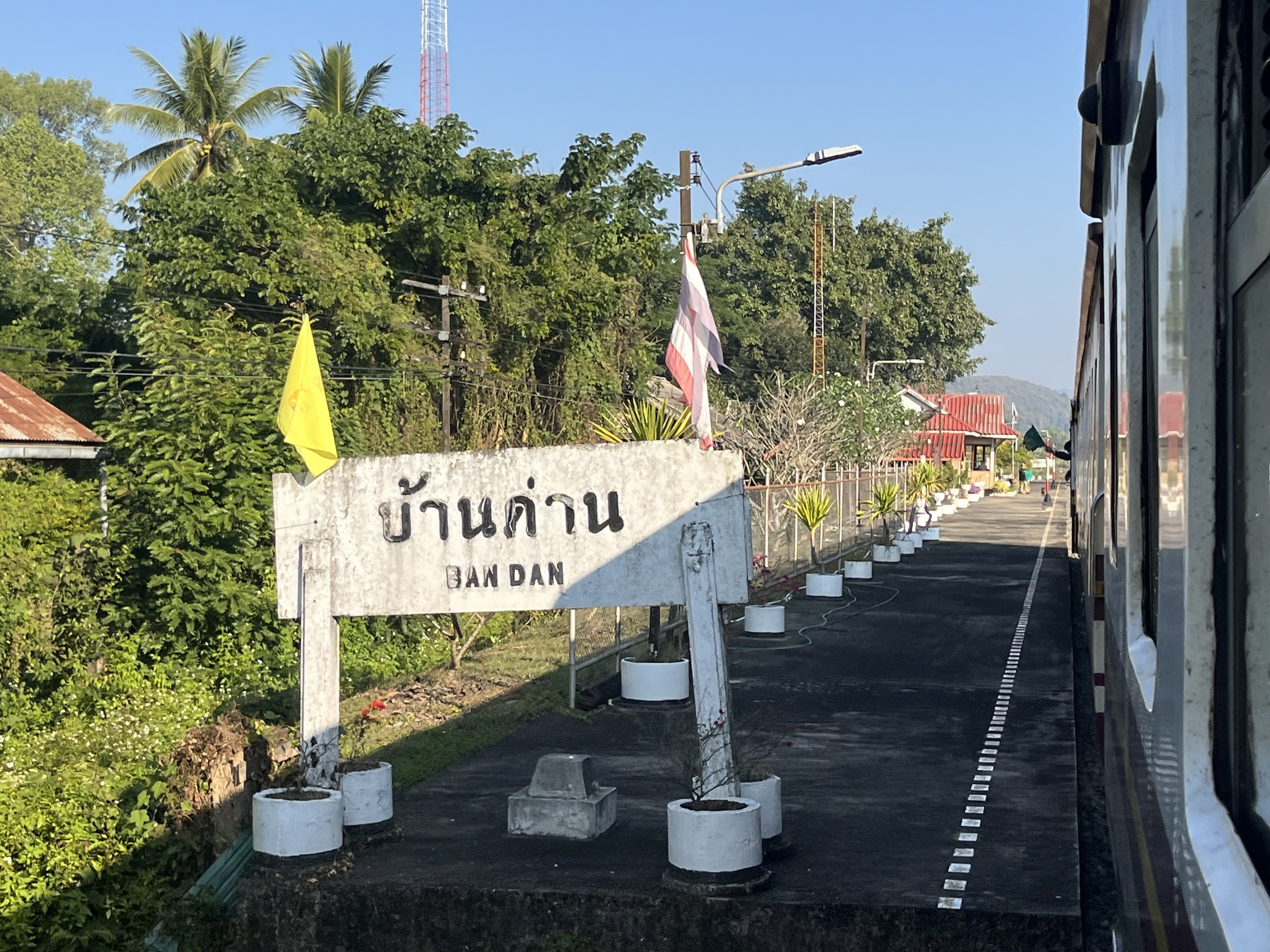
- Station in 2026

General information
- Location: Ban Dan, Ban Dan Na Kham Subdistrict, Uttaradit City
- Owner: State Railway of Thailand
- Line: Northern Line
- Platforms: 1
- Tracks: 3

Other information
- Station code: บด.

Services
Preceding station	State Railway of Thailand	Following station
Tha Sao Halt towards Hua Lamphong or Krung Thep Aphiwat	Northern Line	Pang Ton Phueng towards Chiang Mai
Location

Ban Dan railway station is a railway station located in Ban Dan Na Kham Subdistrict, Uttaradit City, Uttaradit. It is located 497.561 km from Bangkok railway station and is a class 3 railway station. It is on the Northern Line of the State Railway of Thailand.

== Gallery ==
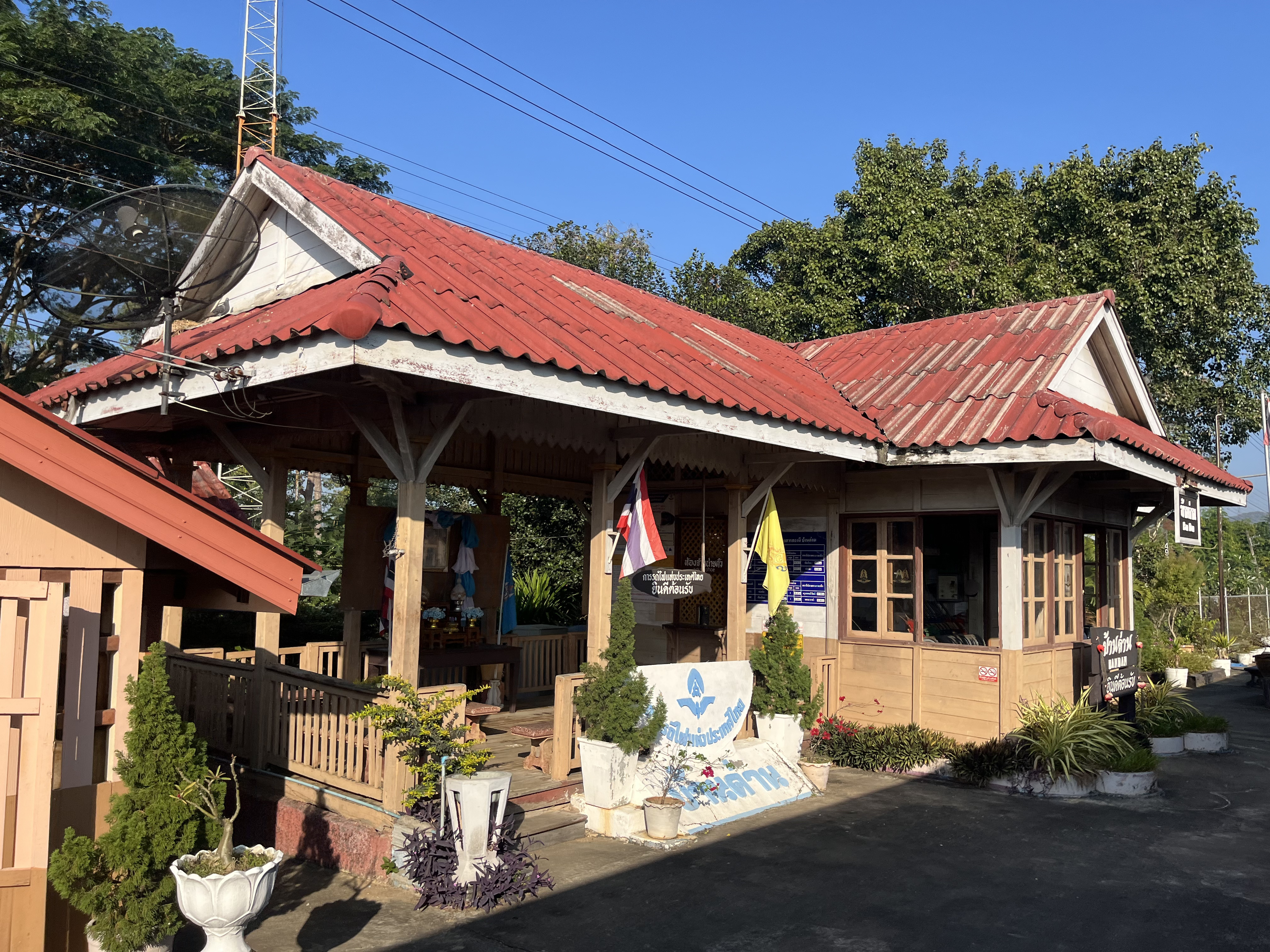
Station building
