= Khoi Sung =

Khoi Sung ข่อยสูง
- Tambon
- Country: Thailand
- Province: Uttaradit
- District: Tron District

Population (2005)
  - Total: 4,255
- Time zone: UTC+7 (ICT)

Khoi Sung (Thai: ข่อยสูง, pronounced [kʰɔ̀j sǔːŋ]) is a village and tambon (sub-district) of Tron District, in Uttaradit Province, Thailand. In 2005 it had a population of 4,255 people. The tambon contains eight villages.
