= Ban Kaeng =

Ban Kaeng บ้านแก่ง
- Tambon
- Interactive map of Ban Kaeng
- Coordinates: 17.453323°N 100.137586°E
- Country: Thailand
- Province: Uttaradit
- District: Tron District

Population (2005)
  - Total: 7,567
- Time zone: UTC+7 (ICT)

Ban Kaeng (Thai: บ้านแก่ง, pronounced [bâːn kɛ̀ŋ]) is a village and tambon (sub-district) of Tron District, in Uttaradit Province, Thailand. In 2005 it had a population of 7567 people. The tambon contains 10 villages.
