= Ban Ko =

Ban Ko (Thai: บ้านเกาะ) may refer to several places in Thailand:

- Ban Ko, Bang Sai, Phra Nakhon Si Ayutthaya Province
- Ban Ko, Mueang Nakhon Ratchasima
- Ban Ko, Mueang Samut Sakhon
- Ban Ko, Mueang Uttaradit
- Ban Ko, Phrom Khiri, Nakhon Si Thammarat Province
- Ban Ko, Phra Nakhon Si Ayutthaya District

== See also ==
- List of tambon in Thailand – B
