= Tha It =

Tha It may refer to:

- Tha It, Mueang Uttaradit, a subdistrict in Mueang Uttaradit District, Thailand
- Tha It, Pak Kret, a subdistrict in Pak Kret District, Nonthaburi, Thailand
