= Dan Mae Kham Man =

Coordinates: 17.5421°N 99.9574°E

Dan Mae Kham Man ด่านแม่คำมัน
- Tambon
- Interactive map of Dan Mae Kham Man
- Country: Thailand
- Province: Uttaradit
- District: Laplae District

Population (2005)
  - Total: 5,423
- Time zone: UTC+7 (ICT)

Dan Mae Kham Man (Thai: ด่านแม่คำมัน, pronounced [dàːn mɛ̂ː kʰām mān]) is a village and tambon (sub-district) of Laplae District, in Uttaradit Province, Thailand. In 2005, it had a population of 5,423 people. The tambon contains eight villages.
