= Nam Ang =

Nam Ang น้ำอ่าง
- Tambon
- Country: Thailand
- Province: Uttaradit
- District: Tron District

Population (2005)
  - Total: 7,975
- Time zone: UTC+7 (ICT)

Nam Ang (Thai: น้ำอ่าง, pronounced [náːm ʔàːŋ]) is a village and tambon (sub-district) of Tron District, in Uttaradit Province, Thailand. In 2005 it had a population of 7,975. The tambon contains 10 villages.
