= Nam Man =

Village and tambon of Tha Pla district, Uttaradit province, Thailand

- Tambon
- Country: Thailand
- Province: Uttaradit
- District: Tha Pla district

Population (2005)
  - Total: 7,270
- Time zone: UTC+07:00 (ICT)

Nam Man (Thai: น้ำหมัน, pronounced [náːm mǎn]) is a village and tambon (sub-district) of Tha Pla district, in Uttaradit province, Thailand. In 2005 it had a population of 7,270 people. The tambon contains 12 villages.
