= Tha Sao =

Tha Sao ท่าเสา
- Tambon
- Interactive map of Tha Sao
- Coordinates: 17°39′32″N 100°05′52″E
- Country: Thailand
- Province: Uttaradit
- Amphoe: Mueang Uttaradit

Population (2020)
  - Total: 14,691
- Time zone: UTC+7 (TST)
- Postal code: 53000
- TIS 1099: 530102

Tha Sao (Thai: ท่าเสา) is a tambon (subdistrict) of Mueang Uttaradit District, in Uttaradit Province, Thailand. In 2020 it had a total population of 14,691 people.

== Administration ==
=== Central administration ===
The tambon is subdivided into 10 administrative villages (muban).

No.	Name	Thai
1.	Ban Khlong Huai Phai	บ้านคลองห้วยไผ่
2.	Ban Nong Bua	บ้านหนองบัว
3.	Ban Nong Pha - Na Prong	บ้านหนองผา-นาโปร่ง
4.	Ban Nong Kham Hoi	บ้านหนองคำฮ้อย
5.	Ban Mon Din Daeng	บ้านม่อนดินแดง
6.	Ban Bon Dong	บ้านบนดง
7.	Ban Dong Takhop	บ้านดงตะขบ
8.	Ban Dong Takhop	บ้านดงตะขบ
9.	Ban Nong Hin	บ้านหนองหิน
10.	Ban Mon Din Daeng	บ้านม่อนดินแดง

=== Local administration ===
The area of the subdistrict is shared by 2 local governments.

- the town (Thesaban Mueang) Uttaradit (เทศบาลเมืองอุตรดิตถ์)
- the subdistrict municipality (Thesaban Tambon) Tha Sao (เทศบาลตำบลท่าเสา)
