= Pa Sao =

Pa Sao ป่าเซ่า
- Tambon
- Interactive map of Pa Sao
- Coordinates: 17°35′46″N 100°07′40″E
- Country: Thailand
- Province: Uttaradit
- District: Mueang Uttaradit

Population (2005)
  - Total: 7,478
- Time zone: UTC+7 (ICT)

Pa Sao (Thai: ป่าเซ่า, pronounced [pàː sâw]) is a village and tambon (sub-district) of Mueang Uttaradit District, in Uttaradit Province, Thailand. In 2005 it had a population of 7,478 people. The tambon contains eight villages.
