= Chai Chumphon =

Chai Chumphon ชัยจุมพล
- Tambon
- Country: Thailand
- Province: Uttaradit
- District: Laplae District

Population (2005)
  - Total: 8,607
- Time zone: UTC+7 (ICT)

Chai Chumphon (Thai: ชัยจุมพล, pronounced [t͡ɕʰāj t͡ɕūm.pʰōn]) is a village and tambon (sub-district) of Laplae District, in Uttaradit Province, Thailand. In 2005, it had a population of 8,607 people. The tambon contains 11 villages.
