= Si Phanom Mat =

Si Phanom Mat ศรีพนมมาศ
- Tambon
- Interactive map of Si Phanom Mat
- Coordinates: 17°39′10″N 100°2′23″E
- Country: Thailand
- Province: Uttaradit
- District: Laplae District

Area
  - Total: 1.48 km^{2} (0.57 sq mi)

Population (2005)
  - Total: 3,276
- Time zone: UTC+7 (ICT)

Si Phanom Mat (Thai: ศรีพนมมาศ, pronounced [sǐː pʰā.nōm mâːt]), also spelled Sriphanommas and Sripanommas, is a village and tambon (sub-district) of Laplae District, in Uttaradit Province, Thailand. In 2005 it had a population of 3,276 people.
