= Pha Lueat =

Pha Lueat ผาเลือด
- Tambon
- Country: Thailand
- Province: Uttaradit
- District: Tha Pla District

Population (2005)
  - Total: 6,865
- Time zone: UTC+7 (ICT)

Pha Lueat (Thai: ผาเลือด, pronounced [pʰǎː lɯ̂a̯t]) is a village and tambon (sub-district) of Tha Pla District, in Uttaradit Province, Thailand. In 2005 it had a population of 6,865 people. The tambon contains 13 villages.
