= Ban Dan, Uttaradit =

Ban Dan บ้านด่าน
- Tambon
- Interactive map of Ban Dan
- Coordinates: 17.661361°N 100.286157°E
- Country: Thailand
- Province: Uttaradit
- Amphoe: Mueang Uttaradit

Population (2005)
  - Total: 5,118
- Time zone: UTC+7 (ICT)
- Website: www.bandan.go.th

Ban Dan (Thai: บ้านด่าน, pronounced [bâːn dàːn]) is a village and tambon (sub-district) of Mueang Uttaradit District, in Uttaradit Province, Thailand. In 2005, it had a population of 5,118 people. The tambon contains 12 villages.
