= Charim =

Charim may refer to:

- Harim (biblical figure)
- Charim, Uttaradit, Thailand
