= Hat Song Khwae =

Hat Song Khwae หาดสองแคว
- Tambon
- Country: Thailand
- Province: Uttaradit
- District: Tron District

Population (2005)
  - Total: 4,148
- Time zone: UTC+7 (ICT)

Hat Song Khwae (Thai: หาดสองแคว, pronounced [hàːt sɔ̌ːŋ kʰwɛ̄ː]) is a village and tambon (sub-district) of Tron District, in Uttaradit Province, Thailand. In 2005, it had a population of 4,148 people. The tambon contains seven villages.
