= Hat Kruat =

Coordinates: 17°33′55″N 100°08′05″E

Hat Kruat หาดกรวด
- Tambon
- Interactive map of Hat Kruat
- Country: Thailand
- Province: Uttaradit
- District: Mueang Uttaradit

Population (2005)
  - Total: 7,771
- Time zone: UTC+7 (ICT)

Hat Kruat (Thai: หาดกรวด, pronounced [hàːt krùa̯t]) is a village and tambon (sub-district) of Mueang Uttaradit District, in Uttaradit Province, Thailand. In 2005, it had a population of 7,771 people. The tambon contains nine villages.
