= Ngio Ngam =

Ngio Ngam may refer to several places in Thailand:

- Ngio Ngam, Mueang Phitsanulok
- Ngio Ngam, Uttaradit
