= Pang Ton Phueng railway station =

Railway station in Ban Dan Na Kham, Thailand

Coordinates: 17.7998°N 100.0763°E

Pang Ton Phueng ปางต้นผึ้ง
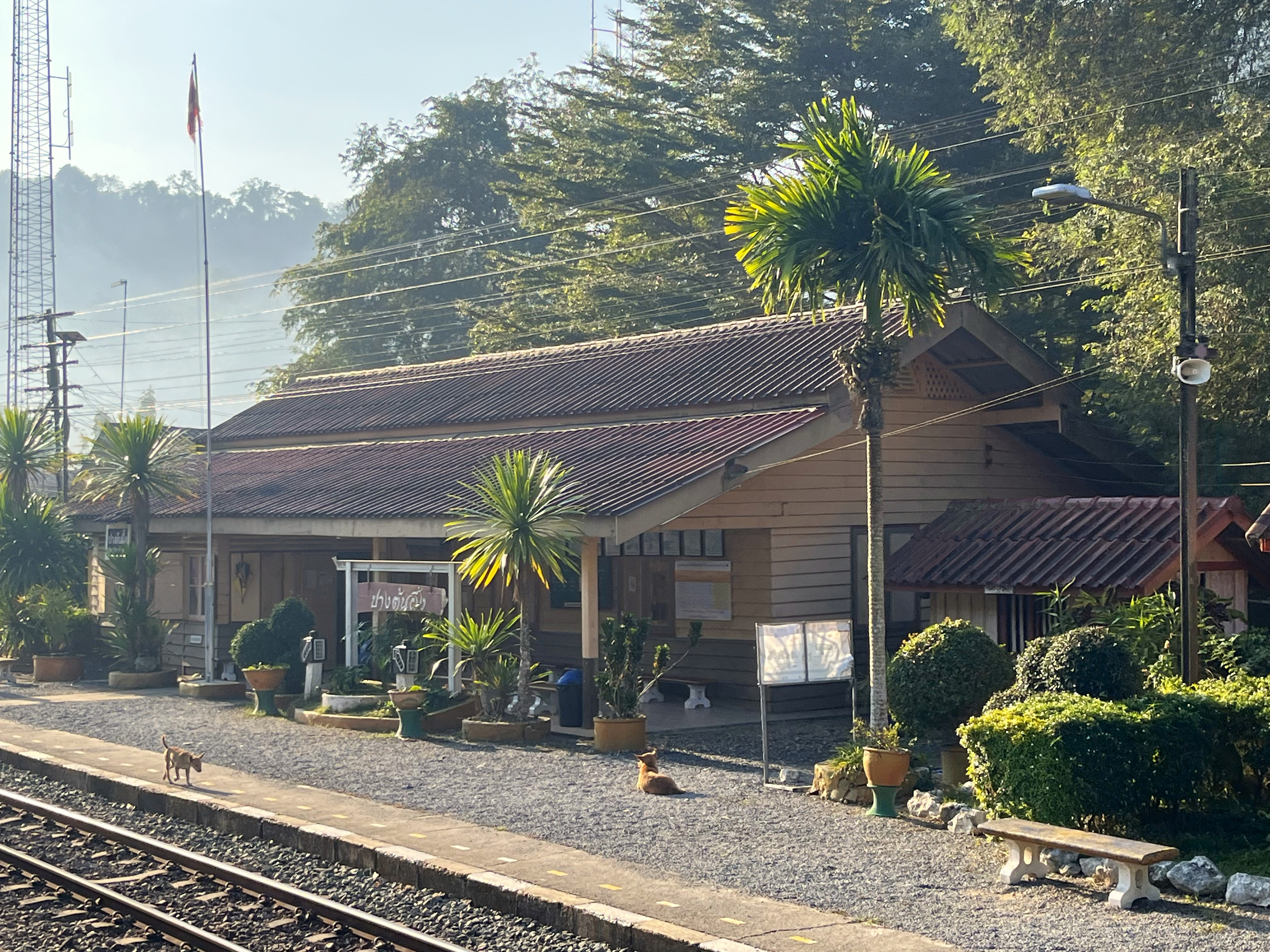
- Station in 2026

General information
- Location: Mu 10 (Ban Pang Ton Phueng), Ban Dan Na Kham Subdistrict, Uttaradit City
- Owner: State Railway of Thailand
- Line: Northern Line
- Platforms: 1
- Tracks: 3

Other information
- Station code: ปต.

Services
Preceding station	State Railway of Thailand	Following station
Ban Dan towards Hua Lamphong or Krung Thep Aphiwat	Northern Line	Khao Phlueng Halt towards Chiang Mai
Location

Pang Ton Phueng railway station is a railway station located in Ban Dan Na Kham Subdistrict, Uttaradit City, Uttaradit. It is located 509.363 km from Bangkok railway station and is a class 3 railway station. It is on the Northern Line of the State Railway of Thailand.

The condition of the station building remains the same as when it was first built. Its name comes from the name of a village (Ban Pang Ton Phueng) in this area.
