= Na Nok Kok =

Na Nok Kok นานกกก
- Tambon
- Country: Thailand
- Province: Uttaradit
- District: Laplae District

Population (2005)
  - Total: 2,862
- Time zone: UTC+7 (ICT)

Na Nok Kok (Thai: นานกกก, pronounced [nāː nók kòk]) is a village and tambon (sub-district) of Laplae District, in Uttaradit Province, Thailand. In 2005 it had a population of 2,862 people. The tambon contains five villages.
