= Nang Phaya =

بني مطيز นางพญา
- Tambon
- Country: Thailand
- Province: Uttaradit
- District: Tha Pla District

Population (2005)
  - Total: 2,593
- Time zone: UTC+7 (ICT)

Nang Phaya (Thai: นางพญา, pronounced [nāːŋ pʰā.jāː]) is a village and tambon (sub-district) of Tha Pla District, in Uttaradit Province, Thailand. In 2005 it had a population of 2,593 people. The tambon contains six villages.
