= Saen To =

Saen To may refer to several places in Thailand:

- Saen To, Mueang Uttaradit
- Saen To, Nam Pat
- Saen To, Tha Maka
- Saen To, Khanu Woralaksaburi
