= Wang Daeng =

Coordinates: 17.4790°N 100.1247°E

Wang Daeng วังแดง
- Tambon
- Interactive map of Wang Daeng
- Country: Thailand
- Province: Uttaradit
- District: Tron District

Population (2005)
  - Total: 11,091
- Time zone: UTC+7 (ICT)

Wang Daeng (Thai: วังแดง, pronounced [wāŋ dɛ̄ːŋ]) is a village and tambon (sub-district) of Tron District, in Uttaradit Province, Thailand. In 2005 it had a population of 11,091 people. The tambon contains 12 villages.
