= Wang Din =

Wang Din วังดิน
- Tambon
- Interactive map of Wang Din
- Country: Thailand
- Province: Uttaradit
- District: Mueang Uttaradit

Population (2015)
  - Total: 4,705
- Time zone: UTC+7 (ICT)
- Postal code: 53000
- TIS 1099: 530113

Wang Din (Thai: วังดิน, pronounced [wāŋ dīn]) is a tambon (sub-district) of Mueang Uttaradit District, in Uttaradit Province, Thailand. In 2015 it had a population of 4,705 people.

== Administration ==
=== Central administration ===
The tambon is divided into 10 administrative villages (muban).

No.	Name	Thai
1.	Ban Wang Din	บ้านวังดิน
2.	Ban Wang Din	บ้านวังดิน
3.	Ban Yang Chum	บ้านยางจุ้ม
4.	Ban Yang Thon	บ้านยางโทน
5.	Ban Nong Pa Rai	บ้านหนองป่าไร่
6.	Ban Huai Prong	บ้านห้วยโปร่ง
7.	Ban Wang Kha	บ้านวังข่า
8.	Ban Huai Pop	บ้านห้วยปอบ
9.	Ban Khlong Samphan	บ้านคลองสัมพันธ์
10.	Ban Wang Din	บ้านวังดิน

=== Local administration ===
The area of the sub-district is covered by the subdistrict administrative organization (SAO) Wang Din (องค์การบริหารส่วนตำบลวังดิน).
