= Hat La =

Hat La หาดล้า
- Tambon
- Country: Thailand
- Province: Uttaradit
- District: Tha Pla District

Population (2005)
  - Total: 4,822
- Time zone: UTC+7 (ICT)

Hat La (Thai: หาดล้า, pronounced [hàːt láː]) is a village and tambon (sub-district) of Tha Pla District, in Uttaradit Province, Thailand. In 2005, it had a population of 4,822 people. The tambon contains nine villages.
