= Mae Phun =

Mae Phun แม่พูล
- Tambon
- Country: Thailand
- Province: Uttaradit
- District: Laplae District

Population (2005)
  - Total: 10,050
- Time zone: UTC+7 (ICT)

Mae Phun (Thai: แม่พูล, pronounced [mɛ̂ː pʰūːn]) is a village and tambon (sub-district) of Laplae District, in Uttaradit Province, Thailand. In 2005 it had a population of 10,050 people. The tambon contains 11 villages.
