= Tha Pla subdistrict =

Coordinates: 17°47′N 100°23′E

Tha Pla ท่าปลา
- Tambon
- Interactive map of Tha Pla
- Country: Thailand
- Province: Uttaradit
- District: Tha Pla District

Population (2005)
  - Total: 8,648
- Time zone: UTC+7 (ICT)

Tha Pla (Thai: ท่าปลา, pronounced [tʰâː plāː]) is a town and tambon (sub-district) of Tha Pla District, in Uttaradit Province, Thailand. In 2005 it had a population of 8,648 people. The tambon contains 12 villages.
