= Phai Lom =

Phai Lom may refer to:

- Phai Lom, Phitsanulok
- Phai Lom, Uttaradit
- Phai Lom, Ban Phaeng
- Phai Lom, Phachi
