= Fai Luang =

Fai Luang ฝายหลวง
- Tambon
- Country: Thailand
- Province: Uttaradit
- District: Laplae District

Population (2005)
  - Total: 9,493
- Time zone: UTC+7 (ICT)

Fai Luang (Thai: ฝายหลวง, pronounced [fǎːj lǔa̯ŋ]) is a village and tambon (sub-district) of Laplae District, in Uttaradit Province, Thailand. In 2005, it had a population of 9,493 people. The tambon contains 11 villages.
