= Nam Rit =

Nam Rit น้ำริด
- Tambon
- Country: Thailand
- Province: Uttaradit
- District: Mueang Uttaradit

Population (2005)
  - Total: 7,127
- Time zone: UTC+7 (ICT)

Nam Rit (Thai: น้ำริด, pronounced [náːm rít]) is a village and tambon (sub-district) of Mueang Uttaradit District, in Uttaradit Province, Thailand. In 2005 it had a population of 7,127 people. The tambon contains 10 villages.
