= Wang Kaphi =

Wang Kaphi วังกะพี้
- Tambon
- Country: Thailand
- Province: Uttaradit
- District: Mueang Uttaradit

Population (2005)
  - Total: 10,364
- Time zone: UTC+7 (ICT)

Wang Kaphi (Thai: วังกะพี้, pronounced [wāŋ kā.pʰíː]) is a village and tambon (sub-district) of Mueang Uttaradit District, in Uttaradit Province, Thailand. In 2005 it had a population of 10,364 people. The tambon contains nine villages.
