= Tha Pla district =

District in Uttaradit province, Thailand

Tha Pla ท่าปลา
- District
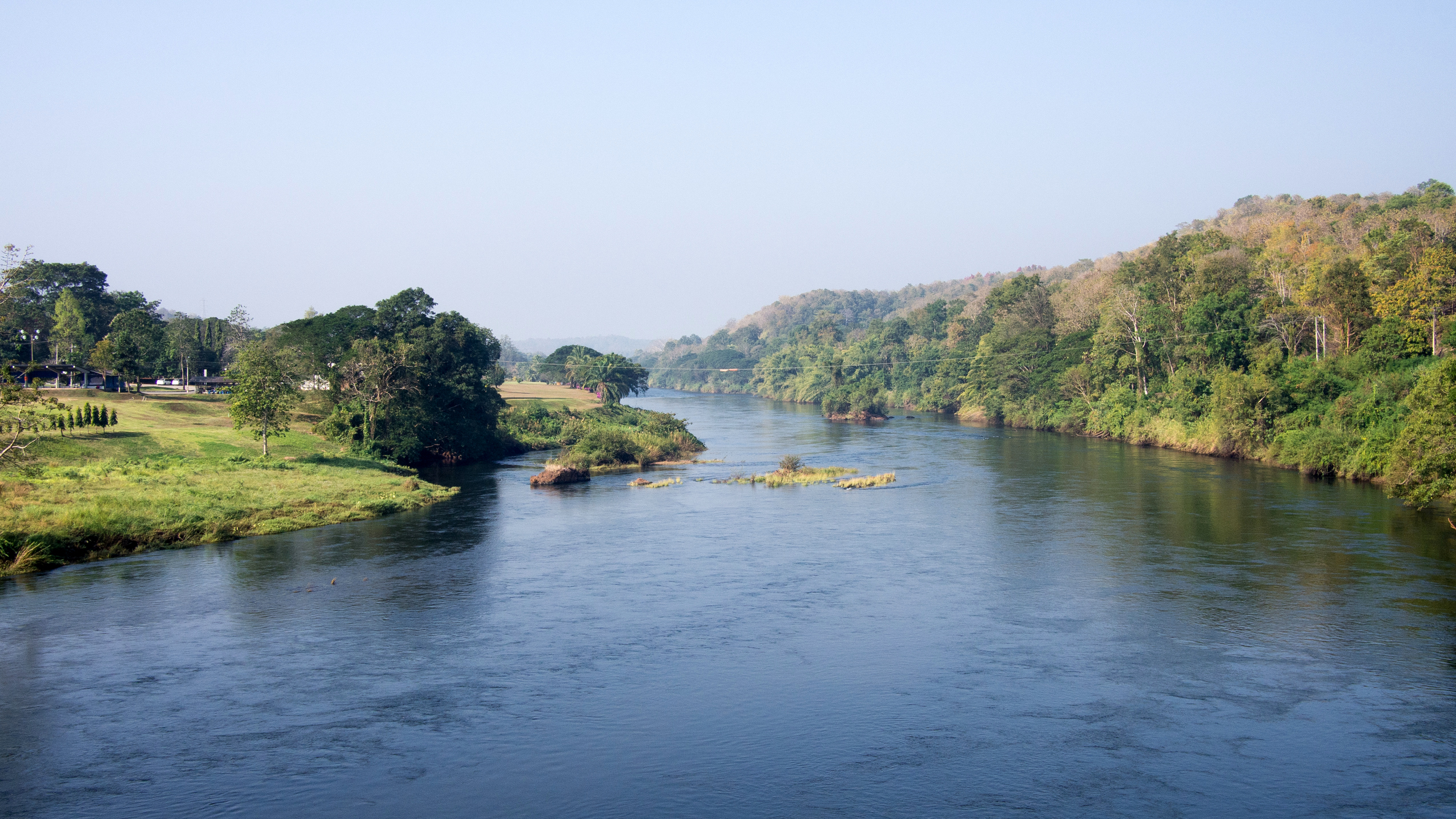
- The Nan River, Tha Pla district

- District location in Uttaradit province
- Coordinates: 17°47′35″N 100°22′38″E
- Country: Thailand
- Province: Uttaradit
- Seat: Tha Pla
- Tambon: 7
- Muban: 76

Area
  - Total: 1,681.445 km^{2} (649.210 sq mi)

Population (2014)
  - Total: 44,025
  - Density: 29.1/km^{2} (75/sq mi)
- Time zone: UTC+07:00 (ICT)
- Postal code: 53150
- Geocode: 5303

Tha Pla (Thai: ท่าปลา, pronounced [tʰâː plāː]; Northern Thai: ᨴ᩵ᩣᨸᩖᩣ, pronounced [tʰâː pǎː]) is a district (amphoe) of Uttaradit province, in Northern Thailand.

== History ==
Tha Pla was originally part of Nan province until it was reassigned in 1923 to Uttaradit Province.

== Geography ==
Neighbouring districts are (from the east in a clockwise order): Nam Pat, Thong Saen Khan and Mueang Uttaradit of Uttaradit Province, Den Chai, Sung Men and Mueang Phrae of Phrae province, and Na Muen of Nan province.

The main river of the district is the Nan River, with the Sirikit Dam creating a 250 km^{2} artificial lake. The Pat River joins the Nan below the dam.

== Administration ==
=== Central administration ===
Tha Pla is divided into seven sub-districts (tambon), which are further subdivided into 76 administrative villages (Muban).

No.	Name	Thai	Villages	Pop.
1.	Tha Pla	ท่าปลา	12	8,574
2.	Hat La	หาดล้า	9	4,696
3.	Pha Lueat	ผาเลือด	13	6,748
4.	Charim	จริม	13	8,642
5.	Nam Man	น้ำหมัน	12	7,172
7.	Nang Phaya	นางพญา	6	2,634
8.	Ruam Chit	ร่วมจิต	11	5,559

Number 6 belonged to the subdistrict Tha Faek reassigned to Nam Pat District in 2015.

=== Local administration ===
There are three sub-district municipalities (thesaban tambon) in the district:

- Tha Pla (Thai: เทศบาลตำบลท่าปลา) consisting of parts of sub-district Tha Pla.
- Ruam Chit (Thai: เทศบาลตำบลร่วมจิต) consisting of parts of sub-district Ruam Chit.
- Charim (Thai: เทศบาลตำบลจริม) consisting of sub-district Charim.

There are six sub-district administrative organizations (SAO) in the district:

- Tha Pla (Thai: องค์การบริหารส่วนตำบลท่าปลา) consisting of parts of sub-district Tha Pla.
- Hat La (Thai: องค์การบริหารส่วนตำบลหาดล้า) consisting of sub-district Hat La.
- Pha Lueat (Thai: องค์การบริหารส่วนตำบลผาเลือด) consisting of sub-district Pha Lueat.
- Nam Man (Thai: องค์การบริหารส่วนตำบลน้ำหมัน) consisting of sub-district Nam Man.
- Nang Phaya (Thai: องค์การบริหารส่วนตำบลนางพญา) consisting of sub-district Nang Phaya.
- Ruam Chit (Thai: องค์การบริหารส่วนตำบลร่วมจิต) consisting of parts of sub-district Ruam Chit.

== Local festival ==
Phi Talok (Thai: ผีตลก; lit: funny ghost) - a post Buddhist Lent festival (around October) of Tha Pla, this ghost mask festival has dual names. While Tha Pla people call this ‘Phi Talok,’ those in Hat La or Tha Faek know it as ‘Phi Hua Khon’ (Khon mask ghost). But whatever the name, this event is all about the belief in heaven and hell. This festival is similar to Phi Ta Khon of Dan Sai district, Loei province and has been organized continuously for over 200 years.
