= Ban Khung Taphao =

Ban Khung Taphao บ้านคุ้งตะเภา (English: Bend of Argosy Watercourse Village)
- Village
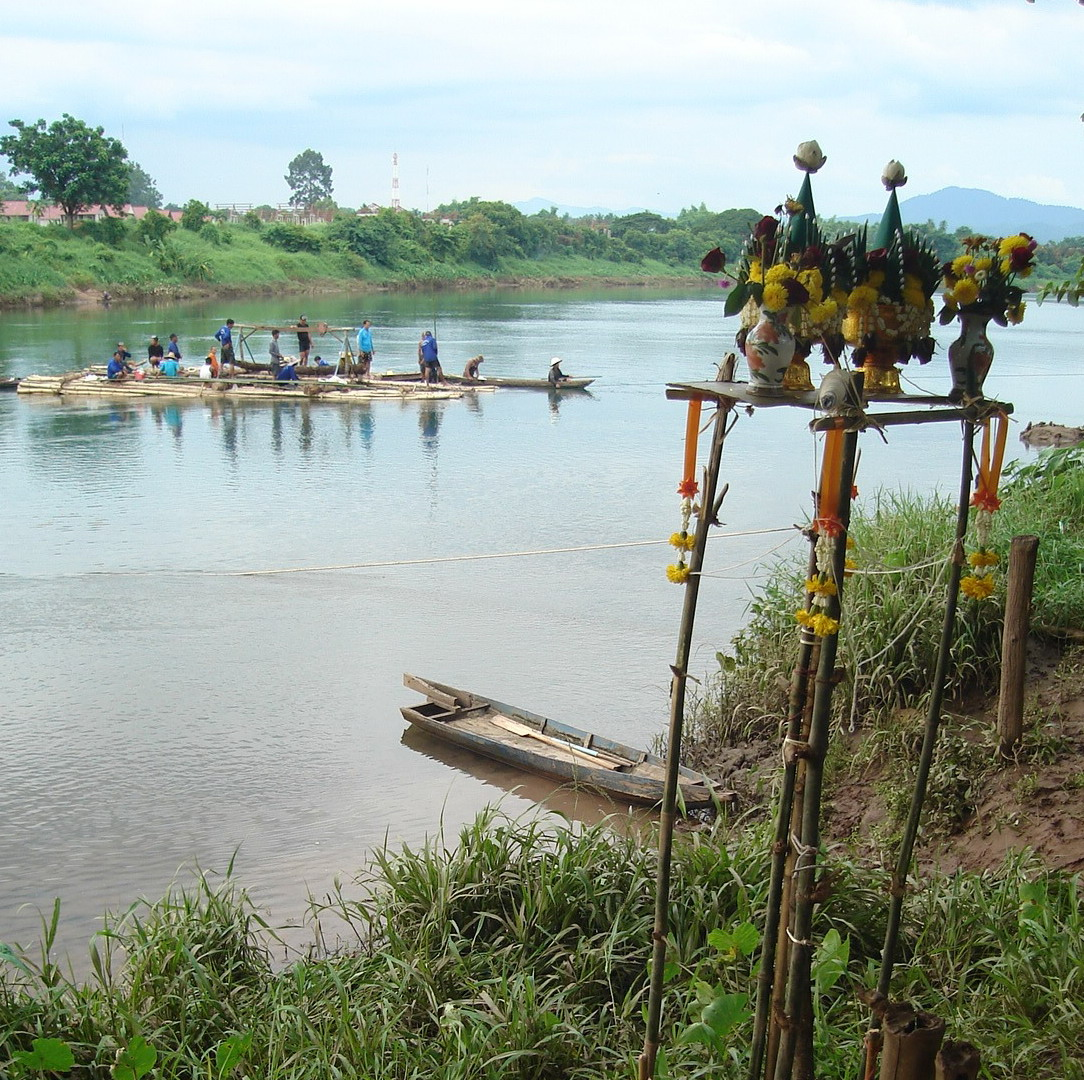
- Kungthapao villagers performs a ceremony to worship about a stream Thailand.

- Location within Thailand
- Coordinates: 17°39′24.44″N 100°8′54.56″E
- Country: Thailand
- Province: Uttaradit
- Amphoe: Mueang Uttaradit
- Tambon: Khung Taphao

Government
  - Phu Yai Ban: Somchai Samphaothong
- Time zone: UTC+7 (Thailand)
- Postal code: 53000
- Chief watercourse: Nan River

Ban Khung Taphao (Thai: บ้านคุ้งตะเภา) is a village in the Khung Taphao subdistrict of Mueang Uttaradit of Uttaradit Province, Thailand.

== Etymology ==
The first element ban, (Thai: บ้าน) means village. The second element khung, (Thai: คุ้ง) means bend of watercourse. The third element taphao, (Thai: ตะเภา) means a sailing ship.

== Geography ==
Ban Khung Taphao lies in the northern portion of Tambon Khung Taphao on the Nan River.

== Government ==
The current village headman of Ban Khung Taphao is Phu Yai Ban Somchai Samphaothong (Thai:สมชาย สำเภาทอง). The headman is an elected post, followed by appointment by the Ministry of the Interior.

== Culture ==
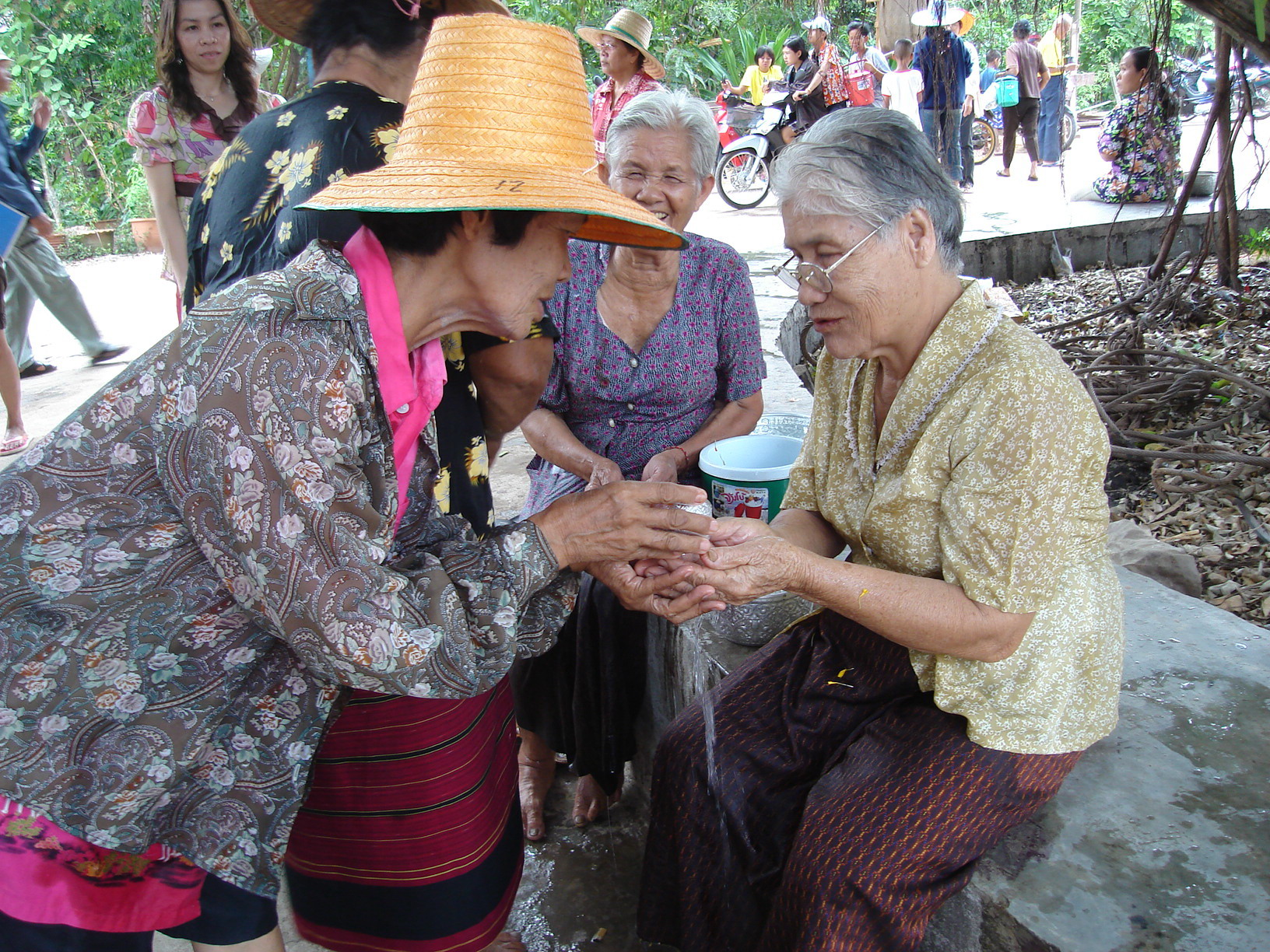
Songkran festival in Wat Khung Taphao

Residents are Theravada Buddhists. Ancestor worship is practiced, and homes often have shrines dedicated to elders of the family who have died; offerings of food and drink are placed beside the shrines.

Children attend school at the Ban Khung Taphao School. They travel to Ban Khung Taphao School by bicycle or on foot. Traditional ethnic clothing is no longer worn by villagers, other than for certain religious ceremonies.
