= Laplae district =

Laplae ลับแล
- District
- District location in Uttaradit province
- Coordinates: 17°39′5″N 100°2′21″E
- Country: Thailand
- Province: Uttaradit

Area
  - Total: 448.8 km^{2} (173.3 sq mi)

Population (2005)
  - Total: 57,559
  - Density: 128.3/km^{2} (332/sq mi)
- Time zone: UTC+7 (ICT)
- Postal code: 53130
- Geocode: 5308

Laplae or Lablae (Thai: ลับแล, pronounced [láp.lɛ̄ː]) is a district (amphoe) in the western part of Uttaradit province, northern Thailand.

== History ==
=== Mueang Thung Yang ===
Mueang Thung Yang, a walled town in the east of the district, is named in Lan Na and central Thai writing but not in the inscriptions of Sukhothai itself. Phiset Jiajanphong proposed that it was Mueang Rat, the seat of Pha Mueang. That identification is one of several, and they are set out at Pha Mueang#Origin.

The Northern Chronicle calls the town Kamphotchanakhon and has it built by Ba Thammarat, ruler of Sawankhalok, for a son, with several dependent towns including Mueang Fang. Phiset read the name as one attached elsewhere to Angkor and to Lopburi, and took it for a mark of standing rather than of rule. The same chronicle groups Thung Yang with Hariphunchai, Sawankhalok and Boribun as towns whose rulers were independent of one another.

Little of the town survives. Its moat was cut into the laterite and can still be traced in places. Wiang Chao Ngo, at the north-western corner, was taken by Thai and foreign scholars of the early 20th century for a site far older than the Sukhothai period, and was heavily looted in the reign of Rama VII. The chedi of Wat Phra Borommathat Thung Yang was rebuilt before 1901. Reports of its earlier shape and the three-tier base that survives point to a lotus-bud form, like the base still standing at Wat Thong Luea outside the town to the east. Ku Ruesi, a small laterite building inside the town, was destroyed before it was recorded. Phiset took it for the one monument there that might predate the Sukhothai period. He described it from villagers' photographs and from the debris on the site, with solid side walls, a corbelled gable roof and a laterite core for a Buddha image.

On the low hill west of the town stand Wat Phra Yuen Phutthabat Yukhon and Wat Phra Thaen Sila At, where the oldest datable pieces are Buddha images of the Sukhothai period. A relic chronicle of Long district in Phrae province, written down about 1638, tells of a lord of Lopburi who came to Thung Yang and raised a Buddha image from the river to Wat Phra Yuen.

=== The district office ===
In the past, the district office of Laplae was in Mueang Thung Yang. Later it was moved to Mon Cham Sin (Thai: ม่อนจำศีล), about 1 km north of the present location. As the location of the office was inconvenient to reach, Luang Si Phanon Mat ordered to move the district office to Mon Sayammin (Thai: ม่อนสยามินทร์). At the same time, King Chulalongkorn visited Laplae and chose Mon Cham Sin as the location of the Buddha statue named Phra Luea (Thai: พระเหลือ). This statue was made from the gold left after completion of the Buddha statue called Phra Phuttha Chinnarat in neighboring Phitsanulok.

=== Legend of Laplae ===
Laplae means 'hidden from sight'. One guess as to the origin of the name is that the path to get there is so obscure that the uninitiated get lost. Another idea is that in ancient times the people of the cities of Nan and Phrae would seek refuge in the densely forested valleys of Laplae in times of war. The local people believe that only a good man can reach Laplae.

There is a story that has been passed down known as "the legend of Laplae". It tells that once upon a time, there was a man who saw two beautiful women walking out from Laplae carrying leaves. The women proceeded to hide these leaves. The man was curious so he took one of the leaves. In the afternoon, one of the women came back and couldn't find her leaf. The man then appeared before her and offered her a trade: she had to take the man to Laplae with her if he gave her the leaf. She accepted and led the man to Laplae. Then the man noticed that in Laplae there were only women. The woman explained that in Laplae there is a rule that no one is allowed to lie and that the men couldn't keep their word and only the women could.

Time passed by and the man and woman fell in love with each other and they married and had a child. One day, the woman went outside and the baby cried so the man lied to it and said that his mother had already returned. The mother came back and heard the man lie so he needed to leave Laplae. Before the man left Laplae, the woman prepared filled a bag with food and turmeric roots for him to take back to his own village. The man took the bag but during his journey it became very heavy so he threw out some of the turmeric roots. When he arrived home he found that the one remaining turmeric had turned into gold. He was very surprised so he ran back to where he had thrown away the rest but these had changed back into ordinary turmeric roots. He tried to return to Laplae but he couldn't find it so he went back to his own village.

== Geography ==
Neighboring districts are (from the east clockwise) Mueang Uttaradit, Tron of Uttaradit province, Si Satchanalai of Sukhothai province and Den Chai of Phrae province.

== Language ==
A popular account of the Sukhothai dialect, reproduced in a 2023 study of its use in song, names Thung Yang among the few places in Uttaradit province still using the old Sukhothai accent. It lists Laplae among the districts where the older vocabulary survives most fully.

== Economy ==
Approximately 27,000 rai, 43 km^{2}, of Laplae district is cultivated in durians, making it the biggest durian producer in northern Thailand.

Handwoven cotton from Laplae, using natural dyes, are a five-star OTOP product.

== Administration ==
The district is divided into eight sub-districts (tambon), which are further subdivided into 63 villages (muban). There are three townships (thesaban tambon): Si Phanom Mat covers tambon Si Phanom Mat, Hua Dong parts of tambon Mae Phun, and Thung Yang parts of the tambon Thung Yang and Phai Lom. There are a further seven tambon administrative organizations (TAO).

No.	Name	Thai	Villages	Pop.
1.	Si Phanom Mat	ศรีพนมมาศ	-	3,276
2.	Mae Phun	แม่พูล	11	10,050
3.	Na Nok Kok	นานกกก	5	2,862
4.	Fai Luang	ฝายหลวง	11	9,493
5.	Chai Chumphon	ชัยจุมพล	11	8,607
6.	Phai Lom	ไผ่ล้อม	7	6,727
7.	Thung Yang	ทุ่งยั้ง	10	11,121
8.	Dan Mae Kham Man	ด่านแม่คำมัน	8	5,423

== Festivals ==
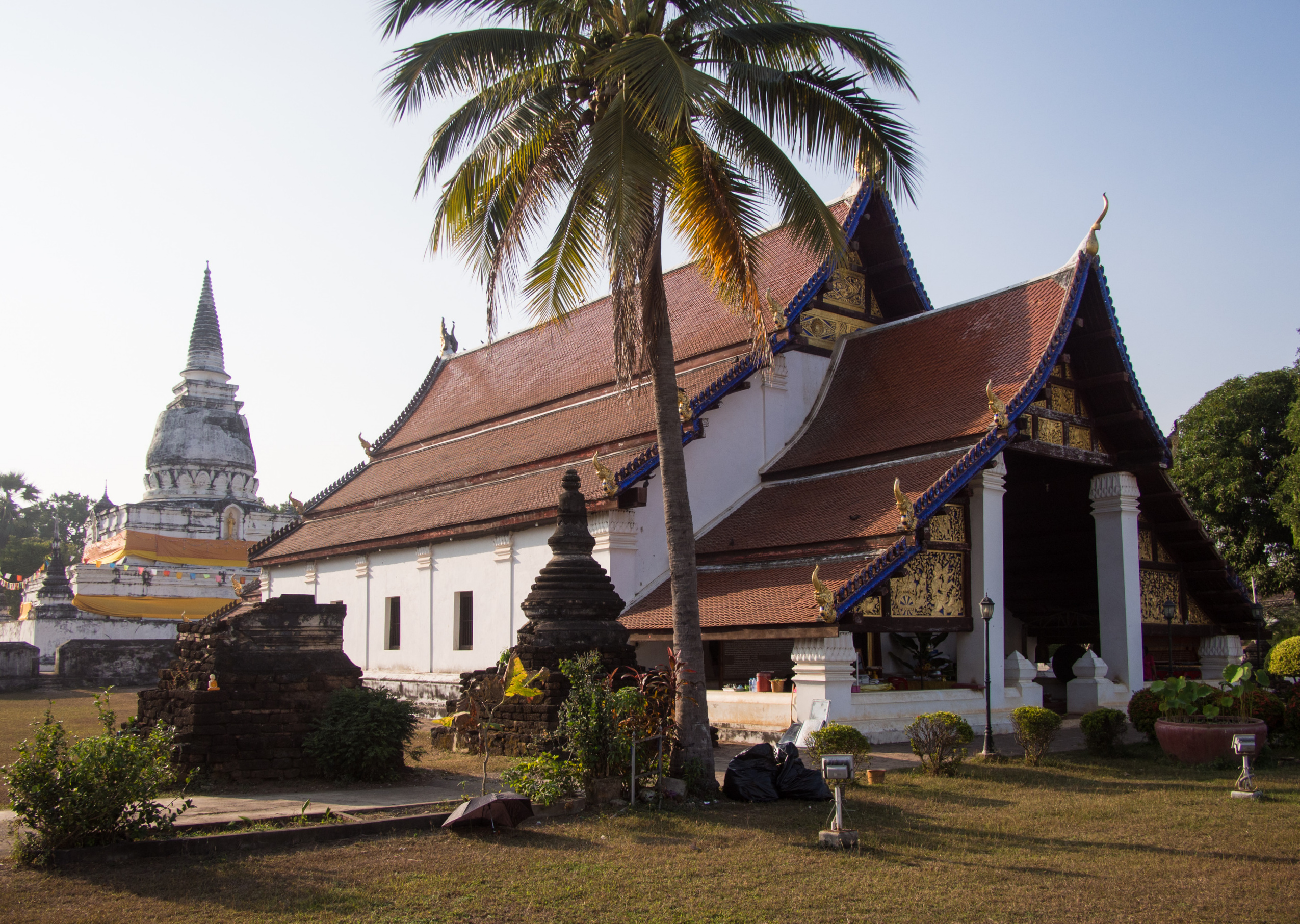
Wat Phra Borom That Thung Yang

- The Atthami Bucha Festival Laplae is held each year a week after Vesak at Wat Phra Borom That Thung Yang to commemorate the cremation of the Buddha.
- The Durian Festival is held each year around the beginning of June.
