= Ban Ko, Mueang Uttaradit =

Ban Ko บ้านเกาะ
- Tambon
- Country: Thailand
- Province: Uttaradit
- District: Mueang Uttaradit

Population (2019)
  - Total: 9,130
- Time zone: UTC+7 (ICT)
- Postal code: 53000, 53170
- TIS 1099: 530103

Ban Ko (Thai: บ้านเกาะ, pronounced [bâːn kɔ̀ʔ]) is a tambon (sub-district) of Mueang Uttaradit District, in Uttaradit Province, Thailand. In 2019, it had a population of 9,130 people. The tambon contains eight villages.
