= Charim, Uttaradit =

- Tambon
- Country: Thailand
- Province: Uttaradit
- District: Tha Pla District

Population (2005)
  - Total: 8,650
- Time zone: UTC+7 (ICT)

Charim (Thai: จริม, pronounced [t͡ɕā.rīm]) is a village and tambon (sub-district) of Tha Pla District, in Uttaradit Province, Thailand. In 2005 it had a population of 8,650 people. The tambon contains 13 villages.
