= Tron district =

Tron ตรอน
- District
- District location in Uttaradit province
- Coordinates: 17°28′56″N 100°6′47″E
- Country: Thailand
- Province: Uttaradit
- Seat: Wang Daeng

Area
  - Total: 314.501 km^{2} (121.430 sq mi)

Population (2008)
  - Total: 35,036
  - Density: 113.6/km^{2} (294/sq mi)
- Time zone: UTC+7 (ICT)
- Postal code: 53140
- Geocode: 5302

Tron (Thai: ตรอน, pronounced [trɔ̄ːn]) is a district (amphoe) of Uttaradit province, northern Thailand.

== Geography ==
Neighboring districts are (from the north clockwise) Laplae, Mueang Uttaradit, Thong Saen Khan, Phichai, of Uttaradit Province, Si Nakhon and Si Satchanalai of Sukhothai province

== History ==
The Northern Chronicle describes a journey from Chiang Saen to Phitsanulok by way of Nan, on which the travellers crossed a river it calls the Tromtanim before reaching the Kaeo Noi. Phiset Jiajanphong identified the first as Khlong Tron, which runs through the district and joins the Nan from the east, and the second as the Khwae Noi. He noted that the names as the chronicle gives them are corrupt.

== Administration ==
The district is divided into five sub-districts (tambons), which are further subdivided into 47 villages (mubans). There are two sub-district municipalities (thesaban tambon): Tron covers parts of tambon Wang Daeng, and Ban Kaeng covers parts of the same-named tambon. There are a further five tambon administrative organizations (TAO).

| No. | Name | Thai | Villages | Pop. |
|---|---|---|---|---|
| 1. | Wang Daeng | วังแดง | 12 | 11,091 |
| 2. | Ban Kaeng | บ้านแก่ง | 10 | 7,567 |
| 3. | Hat Song Khwae | หาดสองแคว | 7 | 4,148 |
| 4. | Nam Ang | น้ำอ่าง | 10 | 7,975 |
| 5. | Khoi Sung | ข่อยสูง | 8 | 4,255 |
