= Pha Chuk =

Pha Chuk ผาจุก
- Tambon
- Interactive map of Pha Chuk
- Coordinates: 17°40′42″N 100°13′56″E
- Country: Thailand
- Province: Uttaradit
- Amphoe: Mueang Uttaradit

Population (2019)
  - Total: 8,125
- Time zone: UTC+7 (TST)
- Postal code: 53000
- TIS 1099: 530112

Pha Chuk (Thai: ผาจุก) is a tambon (subdistrict) of Mueang Uttaradit District, in Uttaradit Province, Thailand. In 2019 it had a total population of 8,125 people.

== Administration ==
=== Central administration ===
The tambon is subdivided into 14 administrative villages (muban).

No.	Name	Thai
1.	Ban Wang Yang	บ้านวังยาง
2.	Ban Wang Yang	บ้านวังยาง
3.	Ban Phra Fang	บ้านพระฝาง
4.	Ban Phra Fang	บ้านพระฝาง
5.	Ban Pha Chuk	บ้านผาจุก
6.	Ban Mon Mai	บ้านหมอนไม้
7.	Ban Khlong Na Phong	บ้านคลองนาพง
8.	Ban Pha Chak	บ้านผาจักร
9.	Ban Nong Bua	บ้านหนองบัว
10.	Ban Mon Hin Khao	บ้านม่อนหินขาว
11.	Ban Den Kratai	บ้านเด่นกระต่าย
12.	Ban Daeng Long	บ้านแดงหลง
13.	Ban Hat Fang	บ้านหาดฝาง
14.	Ban Wang Yang	บ้านวังยาง

=== Local administration ===
The whole area of the subdistrict is covered by the subdistrict municipality (Thesaban Tambon) Pha Chuk (เทศบาลตำบลผาจุก).
