= Phai Lom, Uttaradit =

Phai Lom ไผ่ล้อม
- Tambon
- Country: Thailand
- Province: Uttaradit
- District: Laplae District

Population (2005)
  - Total: 6,727
- Time zone: UTC+7 (ICT)
- Postal code: 53210
- TIS 1099: 530806

Phai Lom (Thai: ไผ่ล้อม, pronounced [pʰàj lɔ́ːm]) is a tambon (sub-district) of Laplae District, in Uttaradit Province, Thailand. In 2005 it had a population of 6,727. The tambon contains seven villages.
