= Ngio Ngam, Uttaradit =

Coordinates: 17.6671°N 100.1754°E

Ngio Ngam
- Tambon
- Interactive map of Ngio Ngam
- Country: Thailand
- Province: Uttaradit
- District: Mueang Uttaradit

Population (2005)
  - Total: 9,040
- Time zone: UTC+7 (ICT)

Ngio Ngam (Thai: งิ้วงาม, pronounced [ŋíw ŋāːm]) is a village and tambon (sub-district) of Mueang Uttaradit District, in Uttaradit Province, Thailand. In 2005 it had a population of 9,040 people. The tambon contains 15 villages.
