= Saen To, Mueang Uttaradit =

Saen To แสนตอ
- Tambon
- Country: Thailand
- Province: Uttaradit
- District: Mueang Uttaradit

Population (2005)
  - Total: 3,374
- Time zone: UTC+7 (ICT)

Saen To (Thai: แสนตอ, pronounced [sɛ̌ːn tɔ̄ː]) is a village and tambon (sub-district) of Mueang Uttaradit District, in Uttaradit Province, Thailand. In 2005 it had a population of 3374 people. The tambon contains eight villages.
