= List of railway tunnels in Thailand =

This is a list of tunnels on Thailand's railway network.

Railway Tunnels in Thailand
Tunnel	Picture	Length	Location	Line(s)	Note(s)
Khun Tan Tunnel	Khun Tan North Western Portal, Lamphun Province	1,352.15 m (4,436.2 ft)	Lampang and Lamphun Province	Northern Line	Located adjacent to Khun Tan station at an altitude of 577 m, it is the highest station on the Thai rail network. The tunnel is in Doi Khun Tan National Park and it took 11 years to build, being completed in 2461 (1918).
Phra Putthachai Tunnel		1,197 m (3,927 ft)	Saraburi Province	Eastern Line	The longest only Thai construction railway tunnel of Thailand.
Khao Phlung Tunnel	The northern portal of Khao Plueng Tunnel, Phrae Province	362.44 m (1,189.1 ft)	Uttaradit and Phrae Province	Northern Line	Khao Phlung Tunnel was constructed in 1910 (BE 2453). Alsthom Loco emerging from the northern portal
Chong Khao Tunnel		235.90 m (774.0 ft)	Nakhon Si Thammarat Province	Southern Line	
Khao Phang Hoei Tunnel		230.60 m (756.6 ft)	Lopburi Province	Northeastern Line	Established on August 19, 1967.
Huai Mae Lan Tunnel	Northern portal of Huai Mae Lan Tunnel, Phrae Province.	130.20 m (427.2 ft)	Phrae Province	Northern Line	Huai Mae Lan Tunnel was constructed in 1912 (BE 2455) A railcar emerging from the northern portal An Alsthom Loco emerging from the southern portal
Pang Tub Khob Tunnel	The northern portal of Pang Tub Khob Tunnel, in Uttaradit Province	120.09 m (394.0 ft)	Uttaradit Province	Northern Line	The shortest tunnel, constructed 1909 (BE 2452) Alsthom loco passing south through the tunnel

== See also ==
- Railway Bridges in Thailand
- Thai Railways: Past and Present - Facebook Group
- Thai Railway videos, including tunnels
