= Sirikit Dam =

Dam in Tha Pla, Uttaradit, Thailand

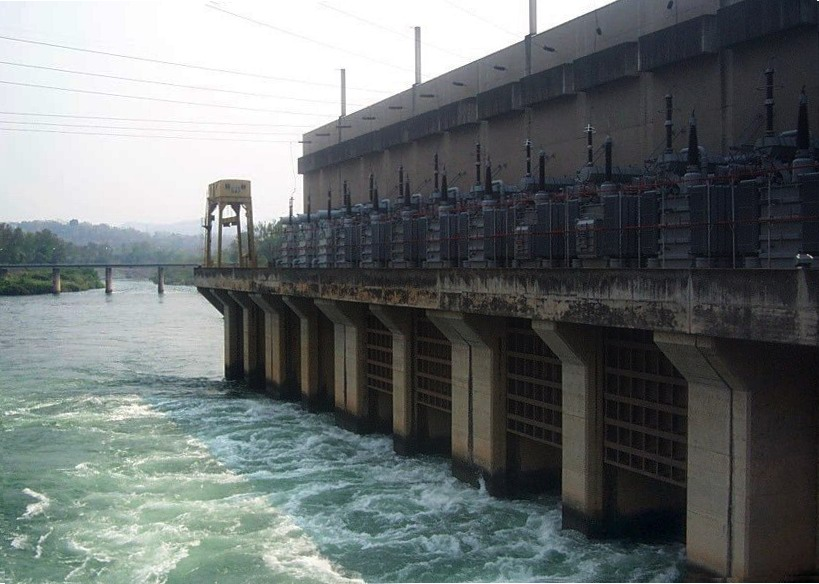
- The dam's power station at its base

- Location within Thailand
- Official name: Queen Sirikit Dam
- Country: Thailand
- Location: Tha Pla, Uttaradit
- Coordinates: 17°45′50″N 100°33′48″E
- Status: In use
- Construction began: 1968
- Opening date: 1974
- Owner: Electricity Generating Authority of Thailand

Dam and spillways
- Type of dam: Embankment
- Impounds: Nan River
- Height: 113.6 m (373 ft)
- Length: 800 m (2,625 ft)
- Width (crest): 12 m (39 ft)
- Width (base): 630 m (2,067 ft)
- Spillway type: Tunnel, service
- Spillway capacity: 3,250 m^{3}/s (114,773 cu ft/s)

Reservoir
- Creates: Sirikit Reservoir
- Total capacity: 9,510,000,000 m^{3} (7,709,882 acre⋅ft)
- Active capacity: 6,668,000,000 m^{3} (5,405,836 acre⋅ft)
- Catchment area: 13,130 km^{2} (5,070 sq mi)
- Surface area: 259 km^{2} (100 sq mi)

Power Station
- Commission date: 1974, 1995
- Hydraulic head: 75.4 m (247 ft) (rated)
- Turbines: 4 x 125 MW Francis-type
- Installed capacity: 500 MW

The Queen Sirikit Dam is an embankment dam on the Nan River, a tributary of the Chao Phraya River, in Tha Pla district, Uttaradit province, Thailand. It is at the southeastern edge of the Phi Pan Nam Range. The dam was built for the purpose of irrigation, flood control and hydroelectric power production. It is named after Queen Sirikit.

== Background ==
The Sirikit Dam among others in the Chao Phraya basin were constructed beginning in the 1950s to exploit the agricultural and hydroelectric potential of the basin. Preliminary construction on the dam began in 1968 and it was finished in 1972. The power plant and first three units were commissioned in 1974, the fourth in 1995. Previously in 1964, the Bhumibol Dam was completed on the Ping River, one of two major tributaries of the Chao Phraya including the Nan. The Bhumibol and Sirkit Dams control 22% of the Chao Phraya's annual runoff combined. Both dams also help provide for the irrigation of 1,200,000 ha (4,633 sq mi) in the wet season and 480,000 ha (1,853 sq mi) in the dry season.

== Design ==
The dam is a 113.6 m (373 ft) high and 800 m (2,625 ft) long embankment dam that is 630 m (2,067 ft) wide at its base and 12 m (39 ft) wide at its crest. The dam withholds a reservoir of 9,510,000,000 m^{3} (7,709,882 acre⋅ft) of which 6,666,000,000 m^{3} (5,404,214 acre⋅ft) is active or "useful" storage. The reservoir has a surface area of 259 km^{2} (100 sq mi). The dam's spillway consists of a tunnel controlled by two radial gates, it has a capacity of 3,250 m^{3}/s (114,773 cu ft/s). The dam's power station contains 4 x 125 MW Francis turbines for an installed capacity of 500 MW.

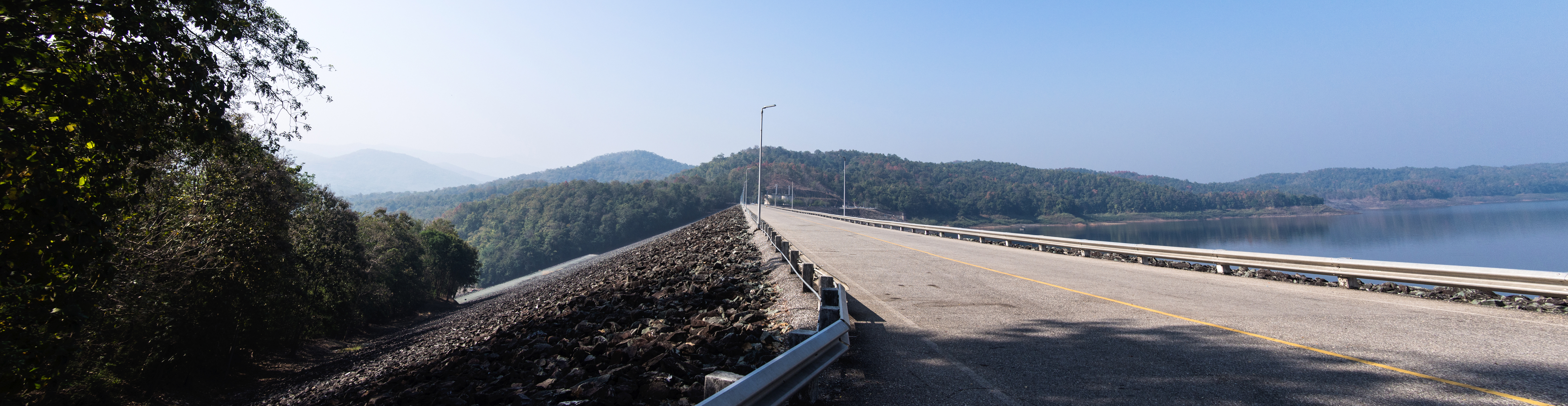
Panorama of the Sirikit Dam, with on the right, the reservoir of the Nan River

== See also ==
- List of power stations in Thailand
