= Tha It, Uttaradit =

Tha It ท่าอิฐ
- Tambon
- Country: Thailand
- Province: Uttaradit
- District: Mueang Uttaradit

Population (2005)
  - Total: 34,500
- Time zone: UTC+7 (ICT)

Tha It (Thai: ท่าอิฐ, pronounced [tʰâː ʔìt]) is a tambon (sub-district) of Mueang Uttaradit District, in Uttaradit Province, Thailand. In 2005 it had a population of 34,500 people. The sub-district covers the same area as the town of Uttaradit.
