= Hat Ngio =

Hat Ngio หาดงิ้ว
- Tambon
- Country: Thailand
- Province: Uttaradit
- District: Mueang Uttaradit

Population (2005)
  - Total: 4,979
- Time zone: UTC+7 (ICT)

Hat Ngio (Thai: หาดงิ้ว, pronounced [hàːt ŋíw]) is a village and tambon (sub-district) of Mueang Uttaradit District, in Uttaradit Province, Thailand. In 2005, it had a population of 4,979 people. The tambon contains 10 villages.
