= Ban Dan Na Kham =

Coordinates: 17°43′N 100°08′E

Ban Dan Na Kham บ้านด่านนาขาม
- Tambon
- Interactive map of Ban Dan Na Kham
- Country: Thailand
- Province: Uttaradit
- Amphoe: Mueang Uttaradit

Population (2005)
  - Total: 10,329
- Time zone: UTC+7 (ICT)

Ban Dan Na Kham (Thai: บ้านด่านนาขาม, pronounced [bâːn dàːn nāː kʰǎːm]) is a village and tambon (sub-district) of Mueang Uttaradit District, in Uttaradit Province, Thailand. In 2005, it had a population of 10,329 people. The tambon contains 11 villages.
