= Mueang Uttaradit district =

Mueang Uttaradit เมืองอุตรดิตถ์
- District
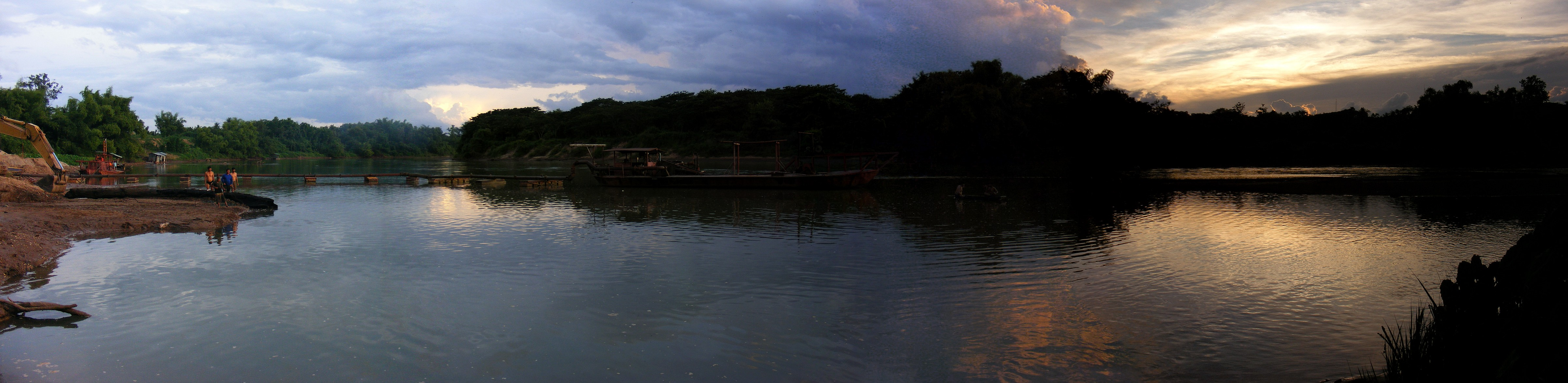
- Panorama of Nan River in the area of Khung Taphao Sub-District, Mueang Uttaradit District, it was called "Kung Sam Phao Lom" (คุ้งสำเภาล่ม)

- District location in Uttaradit province
- Coordinates: 17°37′33″N 100°5′48″E
- Country: Thailand
- Province: Uttaradit
- Seat: Tha It

Area
  - Total: 765.476 km^{2} (295.552 sq mi)

Population (2009)
  - Total: 151,108
  - Density: 200.6/km^{2} (520/sq mi)
- Time zone: UTC+7 (ICT)
- Postal code: 53000
- Geocode: 5301

Mueang Uttaradit (Thai: เมืองอุตรดิตถ์, pronounced [mɯ̄a̯ŋ ʔùt.tā.rā.dìt]) is the capital district (amphoe mueang) of Uttaradit province, northern Thailand.

== Geography ==
Neighboring districts are (from the east clockwise) Tha Pla, Thong Saen Khan, Tron, Laplae of Uttaradit Province and Den Chai of Phrae province.

== History ==
In 1917 the district's name was changed from "Mueang" to "Bang Pho" (บางโพ). In 1938 it was again renamed "Mueang Uttaradit".

== Administration ==
The district is divided into 17 sub-districts (tambons), which are further subdivided into 154 villages (mubans). The town (thesaban mueang) Uttaradit covers the whole tambon Tha It. There are three more sub-district municipalities (thesaban tambon): Wang Kaphi and Ban Ko each cover the whole of their eponymous tambons, and Ban Dan Na Kham covers parts of tambon Ban Dan Na Kham. There are a further 15 tambon Administrative Organizations (TAO).

| No. | Name | Thai | Villages | Pop. |
|---|---|---|---|---|
| 1. | Tha It | ท่าอิฐ | - | 34,500 |
| 2. | Tha Sao | ท่าเสา | 10 | 13,436 |
| 3. | Ban Ko | บ้านเกาะ | 8 | 8,863 |
| 4. | Pa Sao | ป่าเซ่า | 8 | 7,478 |
| 5. | Khung Taphao | คุ้งตะเภา | 8 | 8,765 |
| 6. | Wang Kaphi | วังกะพี้ | 9 | 10,364 |
| 7. | Hat Kruat | หาดกรวด | 9 | 7,771 |
| 8. | Nam Rit | น้ำริด | 10 | 7,127 |
| 9. | Ngio Ngam | งิ้วงาม | 15 | 9,040 |
| 10. | Ban Dan Na Kham | บ้านด่านนาขาม | 11 | 10,329 |
| 11. | Ban Dan | บ้านด่าน | 12 | 5,118 |
| 12. | Pha Chuk | ผาจุก | 14 | 8,499 |
| 13. | Wang Din | วังดิน | 11 | 4,664 |
| 14. | Saen To | แสนตอ | 8 | 3,374 |
| 15. | Hat Ngio | หาดงิ้ว | 10 | 4,979 |
| 16. | Khun Fang | ขุนฝาง | 7 | 3,926 |
| 17. | Tham Chalong | ถ้ำฉลอง | 4 | 2,875 |
