= Uttaradit province =

Province of Thailand

Coordinates: 17°37′47″N 100°5′48″E

Uttaradit อุตรดิตถ์ ᩏᨲ᩠ᨲᩁᨯᩥᨲ᩠ᨳ᩺
- Province
- จังหวัดอุตรดิตถ์ · ᨧᩢ᩠ᨦᩉ᩠ᩅᩢᨯᩏᨲ᩠ᨲᩁᨯᩥᨲ᩠ᨳ᩺
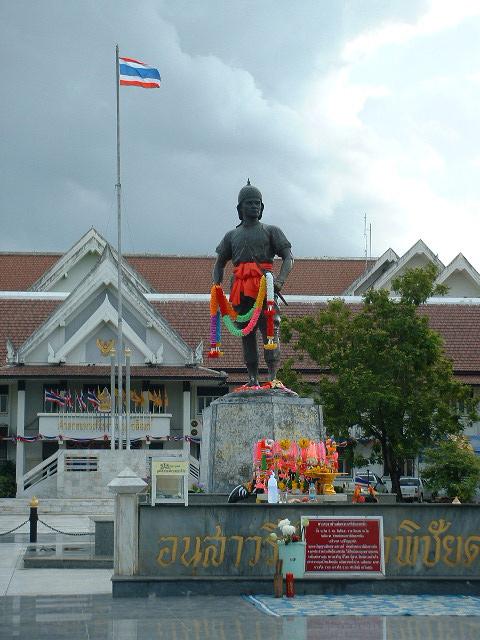
- Phraya Phichai Dap Hak Monument, in front of Uttaradit City Hall

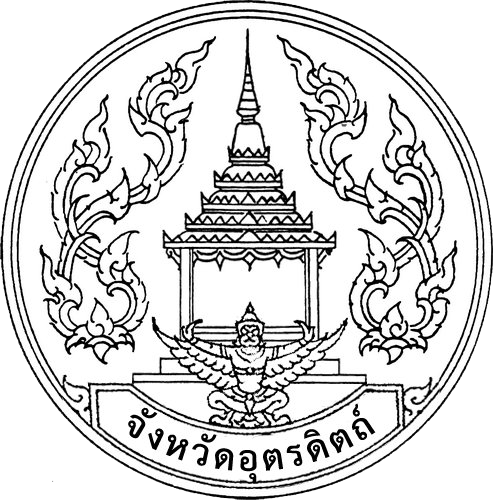
- Flag Seal
- Motto: เหล็กน้ำพี้ลือเลื่อง เมืองลางสาดหวาน บ้านพระยาพิชัยดาบหัก ถิ่นสักใหญ่ของโลก ("Famed Namphi metal. City of sweet longan. Home of Phraya Phichai Dap Hak. World's large source of teakwood.")
- Map of Thailand highlighting Uttaradit province
- Country: Thailand
- Capital: Uttaradit town

Government
  - Governor: Siriwat Bupphacharoen

Area
  - Total: 7,906 km^{2} (3,053 sq mi)
  - Rank: 24th

Population (2024)
  - Total: ▼436,283
  - Rank: 60th
  - Density: 55/km^{2} (140/sq mi)
  - Rank: 71st

Human Achievement Index
  - HAI (2022): 0.6541 "somewhat high Ranked 21st

GDP
  - Total: baht 38 billion (US$1.3 billion) (2019)
- Time zone: UTC+7 (ICT)
- Postal code: 53xxx
- Calling code: 055
- ISO 3166 code: TH-53
- Website: uttaradit.go.th

Uttaradit Provincial Administrative Organization องค์การบริหารส่วนจังหวัดอุตรดิตถ์
- Provincial Administrative Organization
- Interactive map of Uttaradit Provincial Administrative Organization

Government
  - Type: Local administrative divisions
  - Body: Uttaradit Provincial Administrative Organization
  - President: Chaisiri Supharakjinda
- Website: uttaradit-pao.go.th

Uttaradit province
- "Uttaradit" in Thai language (top) and Northern Thai with Tai Tham script (bottom)

Thai name
- Thai: อุตรดิตถ์
- RTGS: Uttaradit

Northern Thai name
- Northern Thai: ᩏᨲ᩠ᨲᩁᨯᩥᨲ᩠ᨳ᩺ (Uttaradit)

Uttaradit (Thai: อุตรดิตถ์, pronounced [ʔùt.tā.rā.dìt]; Northern Thai:ᩏᨲ᩠ᨲᩁᨯᩥᨲ᩠ᨳ᩺) is one of Thailand's seventy-six provinces (changwat). It lies in upper northern Thailand. Neighboring provinces are (from south clockwise) Phitsanulok, Sukhothai, Phrae and Nan. To the east it borders Xaignabouli of Laos. Uttaradit is 488 km north of Bangkok, and 238 km southeast of Chiang Mai. Its name, "port of the north", recalls its former role as a trading post on the Nan River.

== History ==
Uttaradit means the "port of the north" or "northern landing", as it was formerly a trade center on the Nan River. Large boats could ascend the Nan only as far as Bang Pho, where the town now stands, rapids beginning above it, so cargo changed between river and overland carriage here. The beach market at Tha It, a little upstream, drew traders from Phrae, Nan, Luang Prabang and Sipsong Panna, and closed only when the northern railway reached the province.

A Dong Son bronze drum and bronze vessels were dug up in the reign of Rama VII at the low hill by Wat Kasem Chittaram at Khlong Pho, in tambon Tha Sao of Mueang Uttaradit district. They are held at the Bangkok National Museum, whose register gave the find-spot instead as Wiang Chao Ngo in tambon Thung Yang, Laplae district. Withaya Inthakosai, then an archaeologist of the Fine Arts Department, found that record to be wrong. Phiset Jiajanphong confirmed the Khlong Pho find-spot from residents of Ban Thung Yang who remembered the pieces being shown at the Wat Phra Thaen Sila At fair after the discovery. Wiang Chao Ngo was being looted at the time, which Phiset took to be the source of the confusion.

Surface finds at Khlong Pho include grey-black stoneware of Lopburi type, Sukhothai celadon and Chinese celadon of the 12th and early 13th centuries, with an earth rampart cored in laterite and a moat at the creek mouth. Phiset read Khlong Pho and Thung Yang as one unit, Thung Yang the centre and Khlong Pho its landing on the Nan. He noted that the material was collected from the surface or seen in private hands rather than excavated.

In the Sukhothai era several city states (Mueang) subject to the king were in the area of the modern province. Mueang Fang, an old town whose relic shrine was venerated at least from the Sukhothai period, lay on the east bank of the Nan in modern-day Mueang Uttaradit district, and Mueang Thung Yang in Laplae. Chusak Satienpattanodom treats Thung Yang as a frontier town of Si Satchanalai guarding the Khao Phlueng pass, with Mueang Phichai holding the same position further down the Nan. Wiang Chao Ngo itself is thought to be older than the Sukhothai period. Mueang Ta Chuchok lay further down the Nan in Tron district, beside the kiln field of Ban Tao Hai, and it is by that town that the kiln site is identified.

Mueang Rat, the seat of Pha Mueang, has also been sought in the province. Griswold and Prasert na Nagara argued from the terrain for the Nan valley about 50 km upstream from Uttaradit, a reading David K. Wyatt follows while stating that the town has never been found. Prasert placed it at Tha Pla, on a reading of Inscription 8 that takes its list of towns in clockwise order. Phiset Jiajanphong argued for Thung Yang in Laplae, and held that the two do not compete, Thung Yang and Uttaradit lying on one stretch of plain. The Nan was also a route of settlement. Wyatt traces the founders of the towns of the upper valley, and the ancestry of the rulers of late-13th-century Sukhothai, to families who came down the river from the U River valley. They moved into country already held by Mōn and Khmer speakers. Other proposals place it in the Pasak valley, at Lom Sak or Lom Kao in Phetchabun province, and at the old Khorat site in Sung Noen district.

Kilns in the province worked in the shadow of the Si Satchanalai industry. Chusak Satienpattanodom lists Ban Kaeng and Ban Tao Hai in Tron district among the groups that copied Sangkhalok wares, all of them later and of lower quality than the originals. He also argues that the kiln town called Ban Tao Hai Chae Liang in the Phuen Mueang Nan cannot be the Si Satchanalai kiln field, because the journey the chronicle describes is too short. He identifies it with the Tron kilns beside Mueang Ta Chuchok instead. Sangkhalok itself is found east of the Yom at Mueang Thung Yang, Mueang Fang and Mueang Tron.

During the Ayutthaya kingdom, Mueang Phichai was one of the 16 main Mueang of the Thai kingdom. In the reign of King Naresuan, the ruler of Phichai rebelled, joined by the ruler of the Sawankhalok region. Their revolt was suppressed and the inhabitants of both cities were forced to move south to Phitsanulok.

Following the fall of the city of Ayutthaya to the Burmese in 1767, Phichai was the site of several battles against the invaders. The ruler of Phichai drove the Burmese back and was awarded the title Phraya Phichai Dap Hak, the "Lord of Phichai with a Broken Sword". He had broken one of his swords in hand-to-hand fighting.

Chaipong Samnieng reads the province's monuments as a measure of what that position was worth. He takes the size of Phra That Thung Yang and of Wat Phra Fang, and the ability of the Phra Fang faction to gather men and supplies, as signs of the wealth of a junction trading with Luang Prabang and Lan Na; the faction was the last of the Thonburi risings to be put down, and its workshops cast crowned Buddha images in the Ayutthayan cakravartin manner. He reads the muster at Phichai for the campaigns against the Haw in the later nineteenth century the same way.

In the reign of King Rama III Mueang Phichai controlled several Mueang of northern Siam like Nan or Phrae, and even Luang Prabang and Vientiane. At the point where the Nan river became shallow a port was established. As this town grew in importance as an important trade point, in 1887 it was made a Mueang subordinate of Phichai. 1899 the center of Phichai was moved to this new location, which was renamed to Uttaradit in 1915.

== Geography ==
The province is in the Nan River valley. About 45 kilometers north of the city of Uttaradit is the Queen Sirikit Dam, which created a 250 km^{2} artificial lake. The Phi Pan Nam Range reaches the northwest of the province.

Most of the province was once covered with teak forests, then the major product of Uttaradit. The largest teak tree in the world is found at the Ton Sak Yai Park in the Luang Prabang Range. The 1,500-year-old tree measures 9.87 m in circumference and 37 m in height. Originally it was 48.5 m high, but it was damaged in a storm. The total forest area is 4,415 km^{2} (1,705 sq mi) or 55.9 percent of provincial area.

=== National parks ===
There are ten national parks in region 11 (Phitsanulok), of which three are in Uttaradt province. (Visitors in fiscal year 2024)

| Lam Nam Nan National Park | 999 km^{2} (386 sq mi) | (37,174) |
| Ton Sak Yai National Park | 519 km^{2} (200 sq mi) | (19,040) |
| Phu Soi Dao National Park | 340 km^{2} (130 sq mi) | (26,811) |

=== Wildlife sanctuaries ===
There are six wildlife sanctuaries in region 11 (Phitsanulok), of which three are in Uttaradit province and Lam Nam Nan Fang Khwa Wildlife Sanctuary in region 13 (Phrae) is also in Uttaradit province.

| Phu Miang–Phu Thong Wildlife Sanctuary | 696 km^{2} (269 sq mi) |
| Mae Charim Wildlife Sanctuary | 660 km^{2} (250 sq mi) |
| Nam Pat Wildlife Sanctuary | 512 km^{2} (198 sq mi) |
| Lam Nam Nan Fang Khwa Wildlife Sanctuary | 235 km^{2} (91 sq mi) |

=== Location protected areas ===
Overview of protected areas of Uttaradit

Uttaradit protected areas

| | National park |
| 1 | Lam Nam Nan |
| 2 | Phu Soi Dao |
| 3 | Ton Sak Yai |

| | Wildlife sanctuary |
| 4 | Lam Nam Nan Fang Khwa |
| 5 | Mae Charim |
| 6 | Nam Pat |
| 7 | Phu Miang–Phu Thong |

== Economy ==
Uttaradit is largely an agricultural province. Among its best known crops are two fruits, durian and langsat. A durian festival is held each year around the beginning of June in Laplae District. The province is known for two varieties of durian which lack the usual, and to some people offensive, odour: Longlaplae and Linlaplae, both named after Laplae District. Durian production in Uttaradit province was estimated to be around 20,000 tonnes in 2012. The province has approximately 10,600 acres of durian orchards.

The langsat (ลางสาด) (Lansium parasiticum), for which Uttaradit is famous, and its thick-skinned sibling, longkong (ลองกอง), is a fruit that is similar in taste to the longan. A langsat festival is held each year around the middle to end of September.

== Health ==
Uttaradit's main hospital is Uttaradit Hospital, operated by the Ministry of Public Health.

== Language ==
A popular account of the Sukhothai dialect is reproduced at length in a 2023 study of its use in song. It names Ban Khung Taphao and Tha Sao in Mueang Uttaradit district, Ban Phra Fang, and Thung Yang in Laplae district as among the few places in the province still using the old Sukhothai accent. It explains their speech by descent from people of Sukhothai who were given to temples and so exempt from military service.

A 2015 study of the northernmost Sukhothai-dialect community of the upper Nan basin, which lies in the province, links its mangkhala pipe-and-drum music to the Sukhothai kingdom of the 15th century. It traces the decline of that music there to the late 20th century.

== Symbols ==
The provincial seal shows the mondop at the temple Wat Phra Thaen Sila At, in Baan Phra Thaen in the Laplae district. The main item of worship in the temple is a laterite block, which is believed to have been used by Buddha to seek enlightenment. The mondhop is built upon this block.

The seal was first designed in 1940, later a garuda as the symbol of Thailand and the name of the province were added.

The provincial tree is the teak (Tectona grandis). The largest teak tree in the world stands in Ton Sak Yai National Park (สักใหญ่). The tree, estimated to be more than 1,500 years old, is 37 meters high and has a circumference of 9.58 meters at its base. Although the upper part of the tree broke off in a storm, the trunk is still alive. Discovered in 1927, the giant teak tree is part of the 35 square kilometer park of mixed deciduous forest. The edible cyprinid fish Cyclocheilichthys enoplus is the provincial aquatic life.

== Transport ==
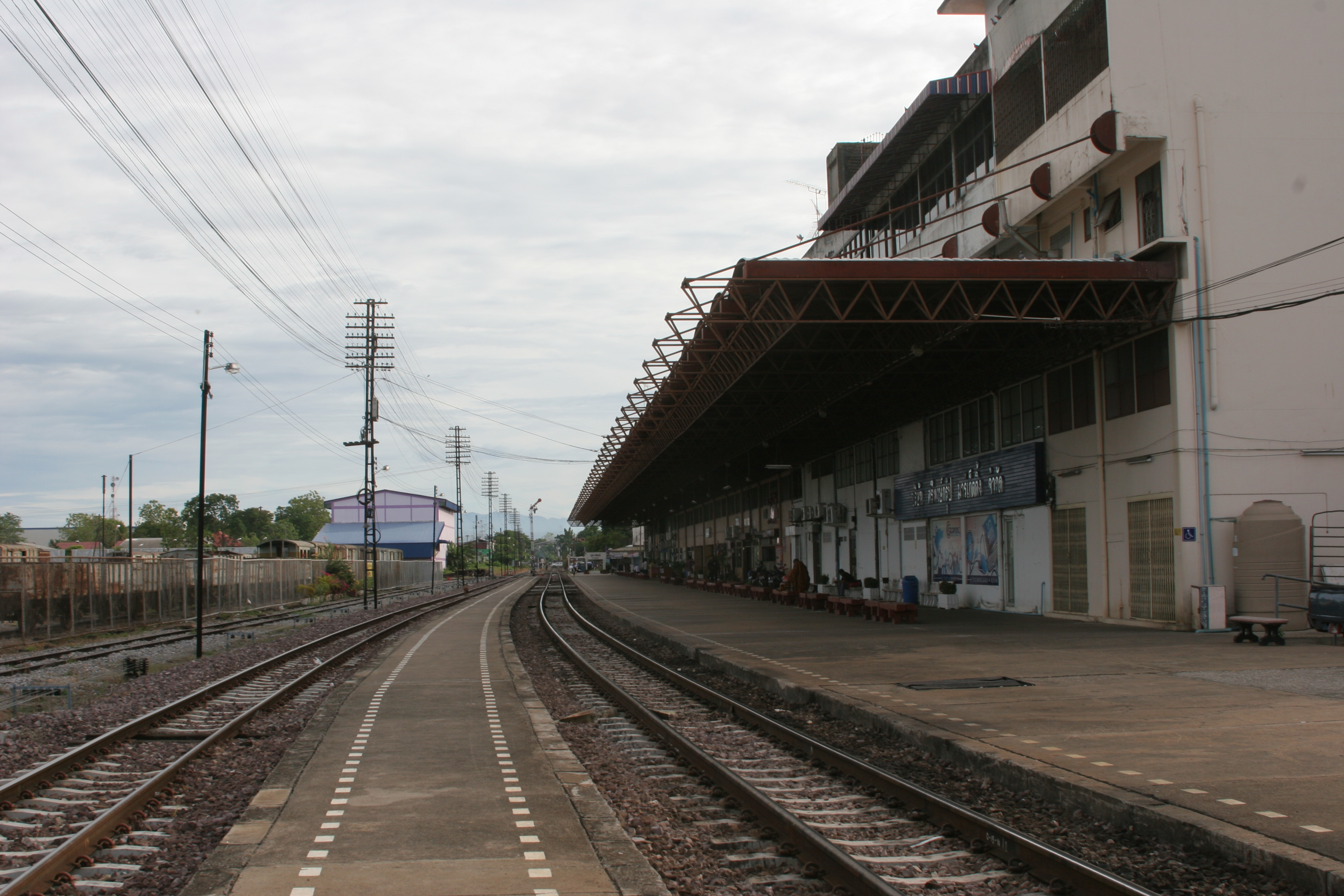
Uttaradit Station

Uttaradit is served by the Northern Line of the State Railway of Thailand. There are two stations in Uttaradit town: Uttaradit railway station, the main station and Sila At railway station, where it is a major centre for Northern Line operations. It does not have an airport. The nearest airport is in Phrae.

== Administrative divisions ==
Map of nine districts

=== Provincial government ===
The province is divided into nine districts (amphoe). These are further divided into 67 subdistricts (tambon) and 562 villages (muban).

1. Mueang Uttaradit
2. Tron
3. Tha Pla
4. Nam Pat
5. Fak Tha
6. Ban Khok
7. Phichai
8. Laplae
9. Thong Saen Khan

=== Local government ===
As of 26 November 2019 there are: one Uttaradit Provincial Administration Organisation (ongkan borihan suan changwat) and 26 municipal (thesaban) areas in the province. Uttaradit has town (thesaban mueang) status. Further 25 subdistrict municipalities (thesaban tambon). The non-municipal areas are administered by 53 Subdistrict Administrative Organisations - SAO (ongkan borihan suan tambon).

== Human achievement index 2022 ==
| Health | Education | Employment | Income |
| 73 | 15 | 38 | 63 |
| Housing | Family | Transport | Participation |
| 1 | 65 | 28 | 8 |
Province Uttaradit, with an HAI 2022 value of 0.6541 is "somewhat high", occupies place 21 in the ranking.

Since 2003, United Nations Development Programme (UNDP) in Thailand has tracked progress on human development at sub-national level using the Human achievement index (HAI), a composite index covering all the eight key areas of human development. National Economic and Social Development Board (NESDB) has taken over this task since 2017.

| Rank | Classification |
| 1 – 13 | "high" |
| 14 – 29 | "somewhat high" |
| 30 – 45 | "average" |
| 46 – 61 | "somewhat low" |
| 62 – 77 | "low" |

Map with provinces and HAI 2022 rankings

== Gallery ==
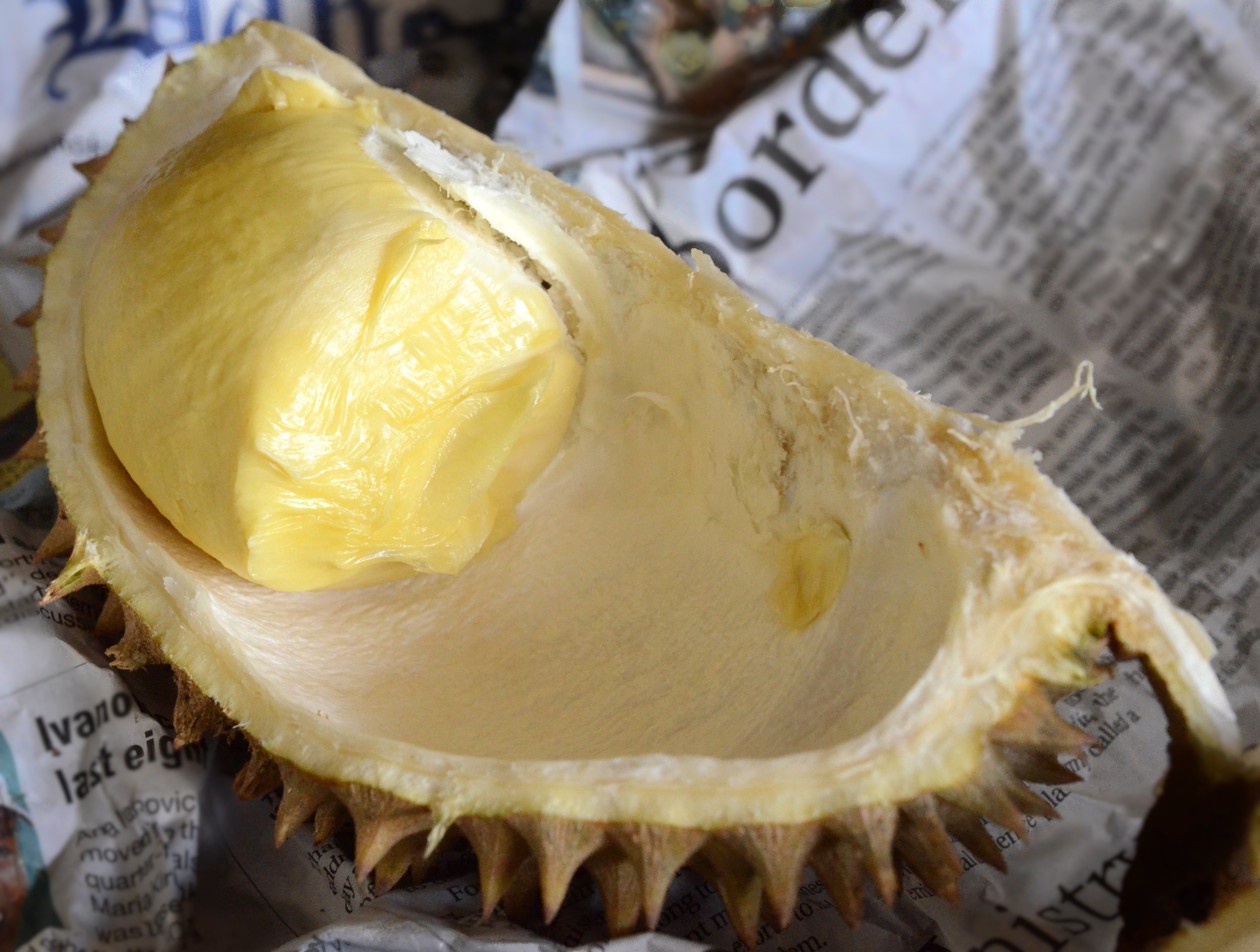
Durian long laplae, Uttaradit province

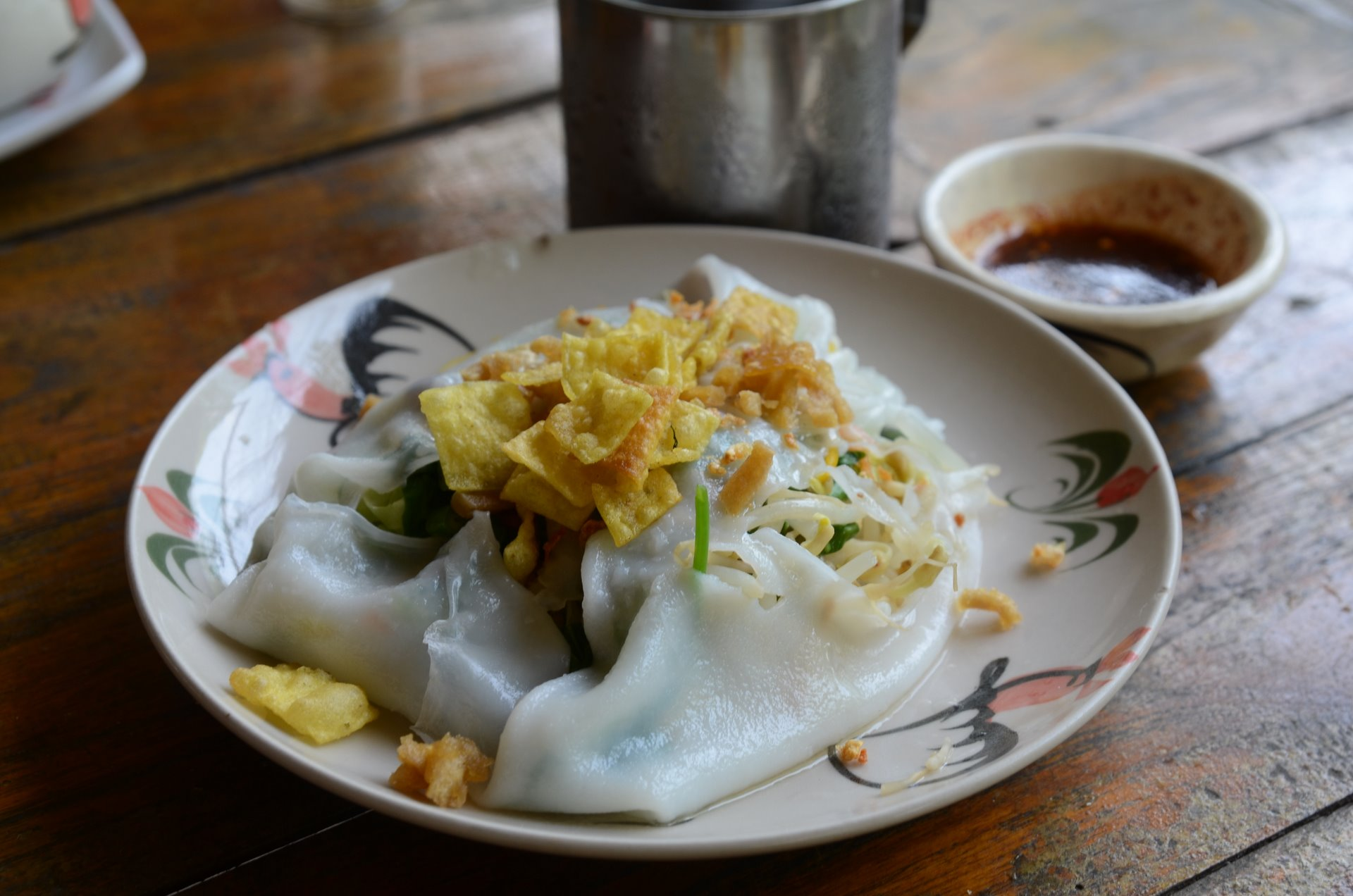
Khao phan, found only in Uttaradit province

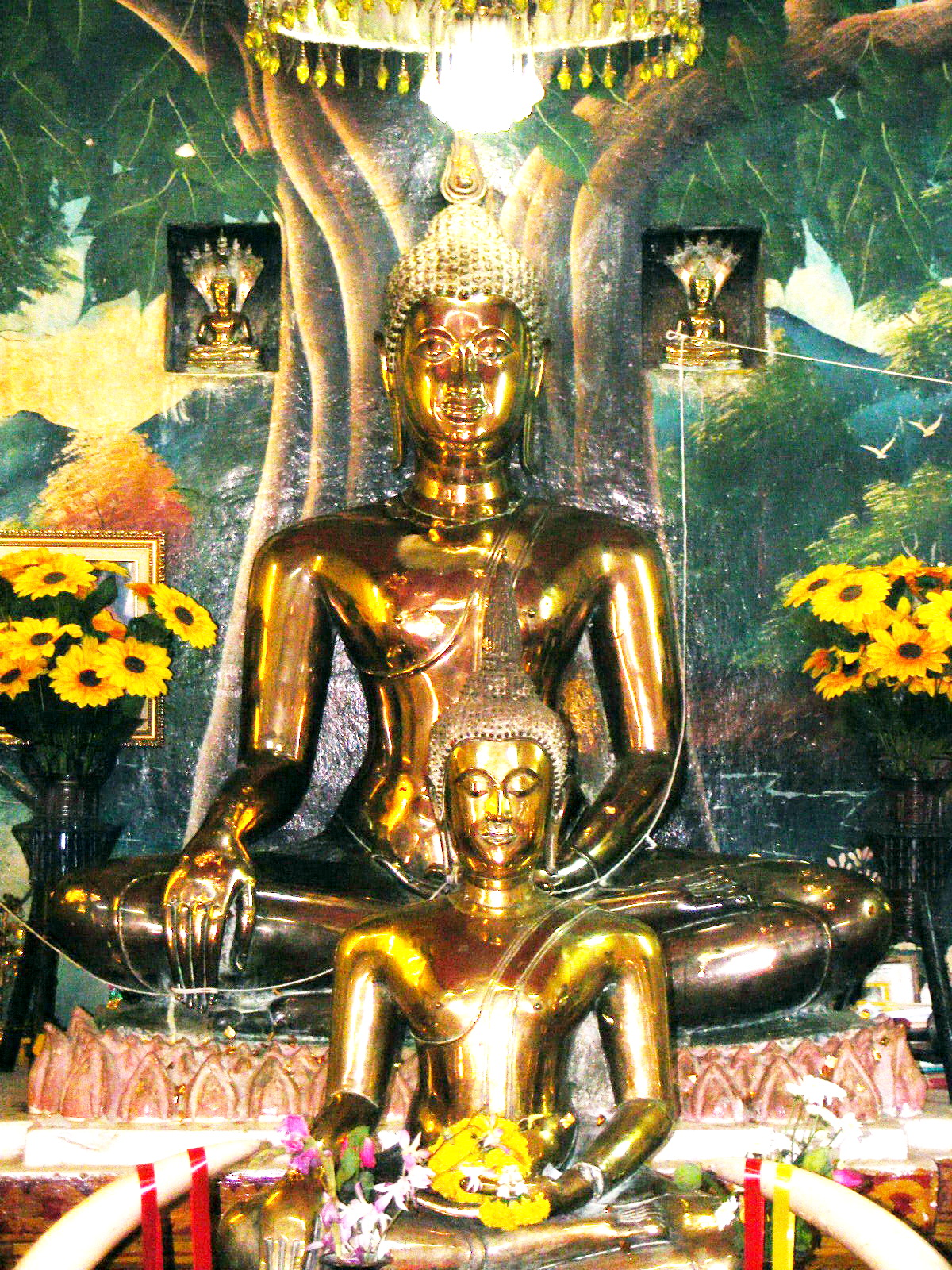
Bronze Buddha, Wat Phra Yun Phutthabat Yukhon

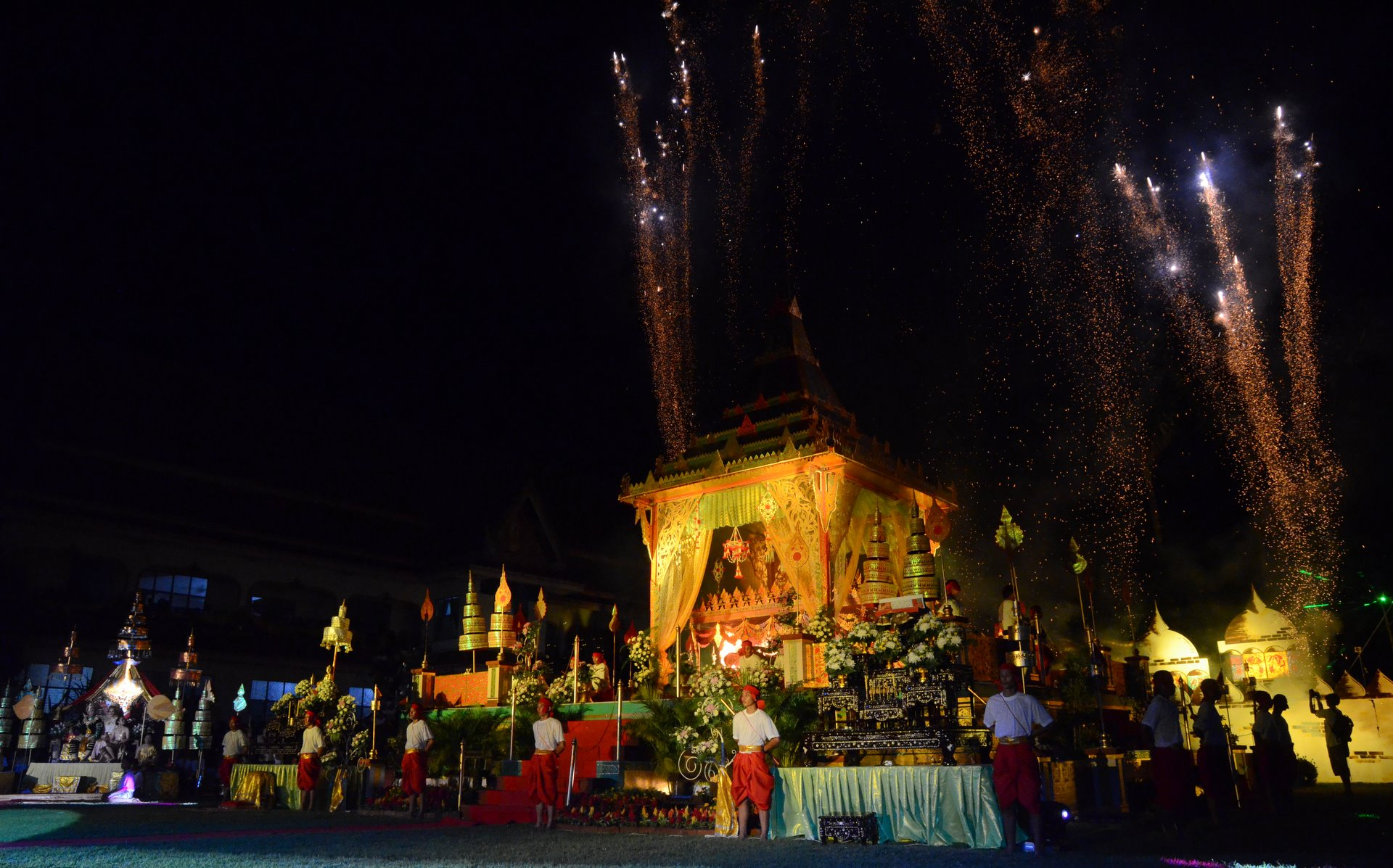
Atthami Bucha Festival, cremation of the Buddha

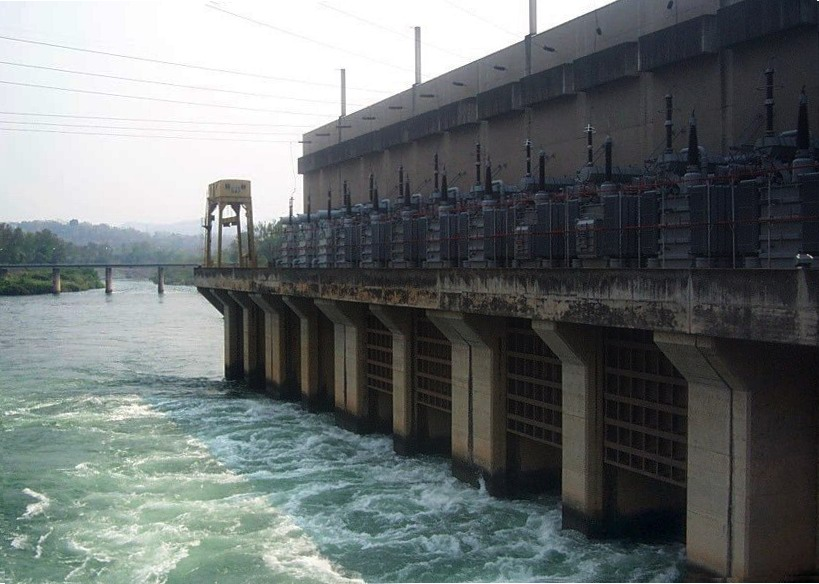
Sirikit Dam

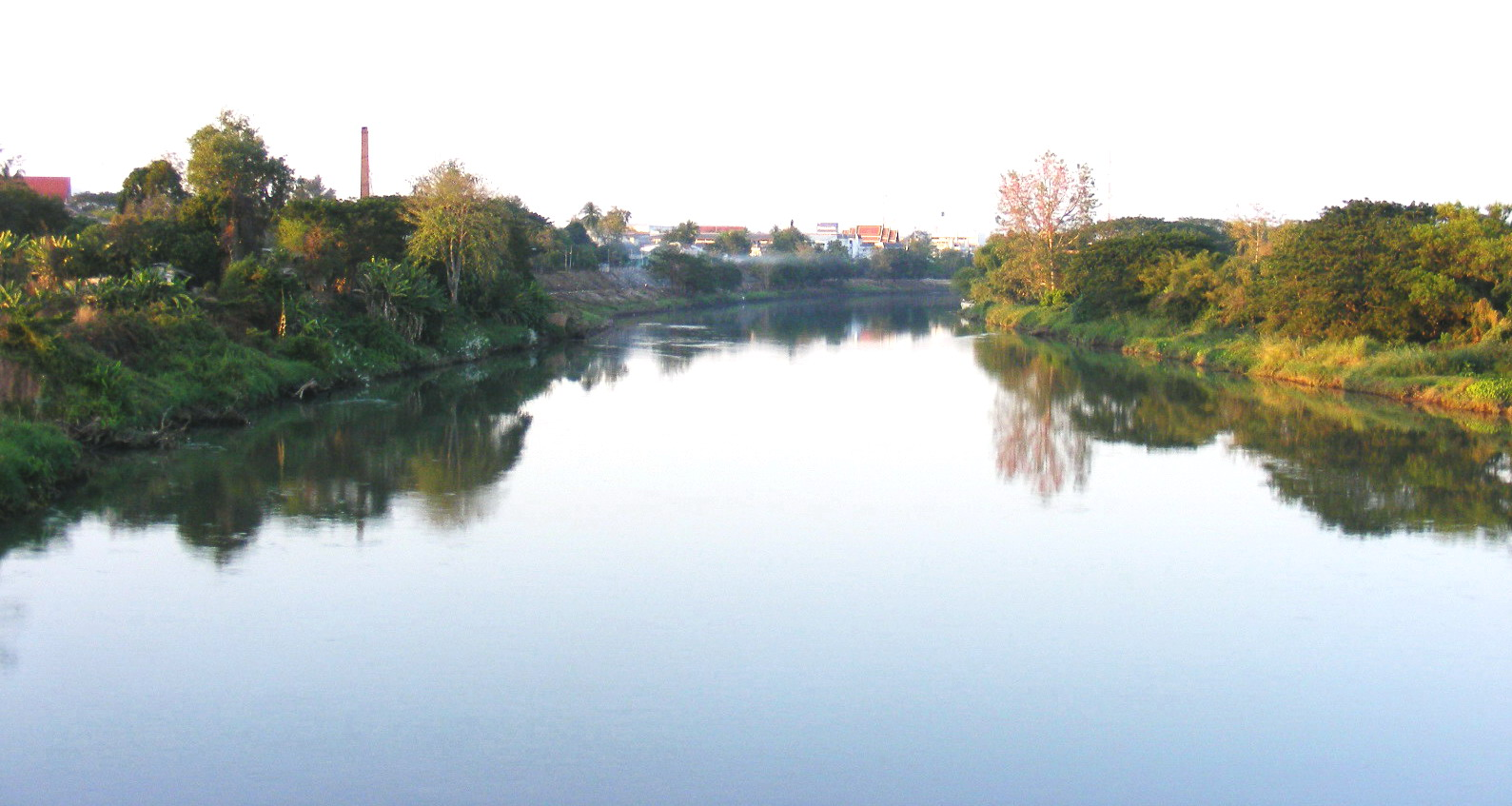
Nan River, Uttaradit

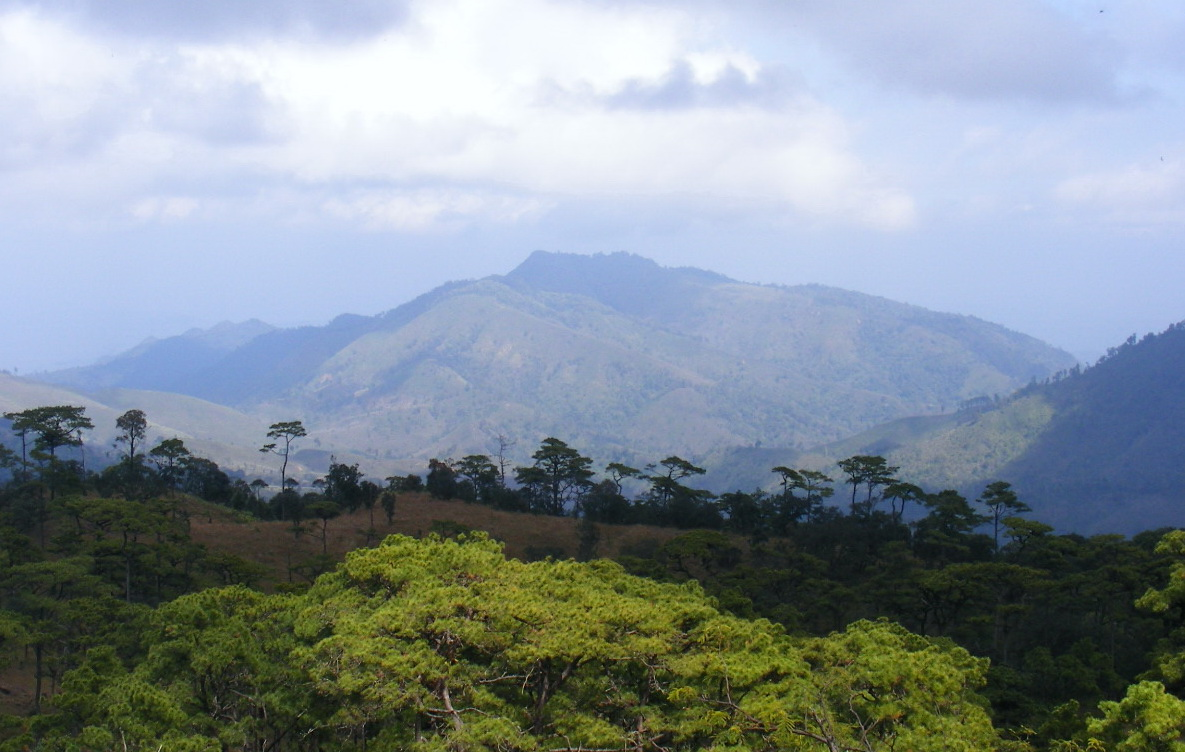
Hill 1428, scene of the Thai–Laotian Border War, Dec 1987 – Feb 1988

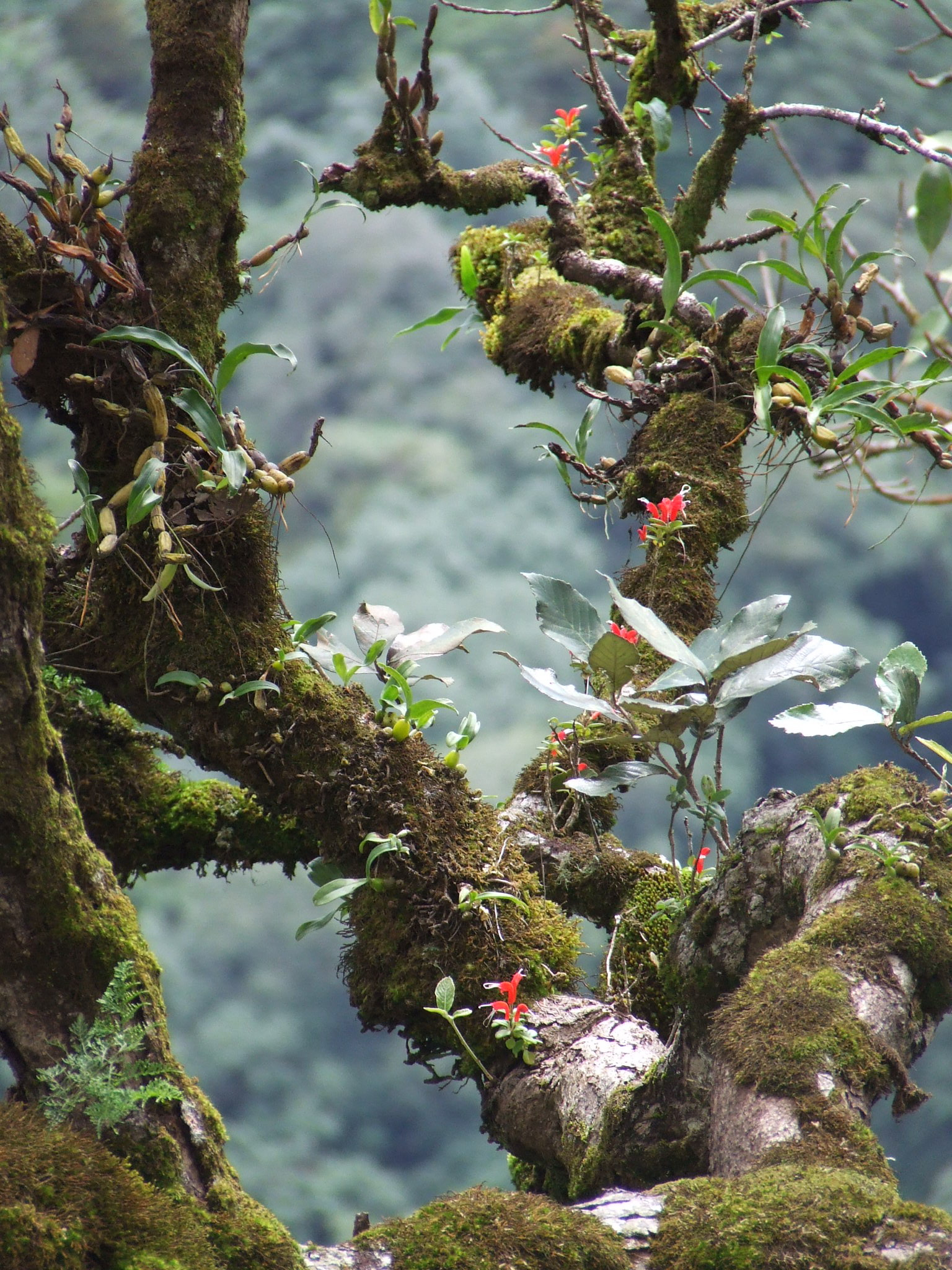
Gesneriaceae in Phu Soi Dao National Park

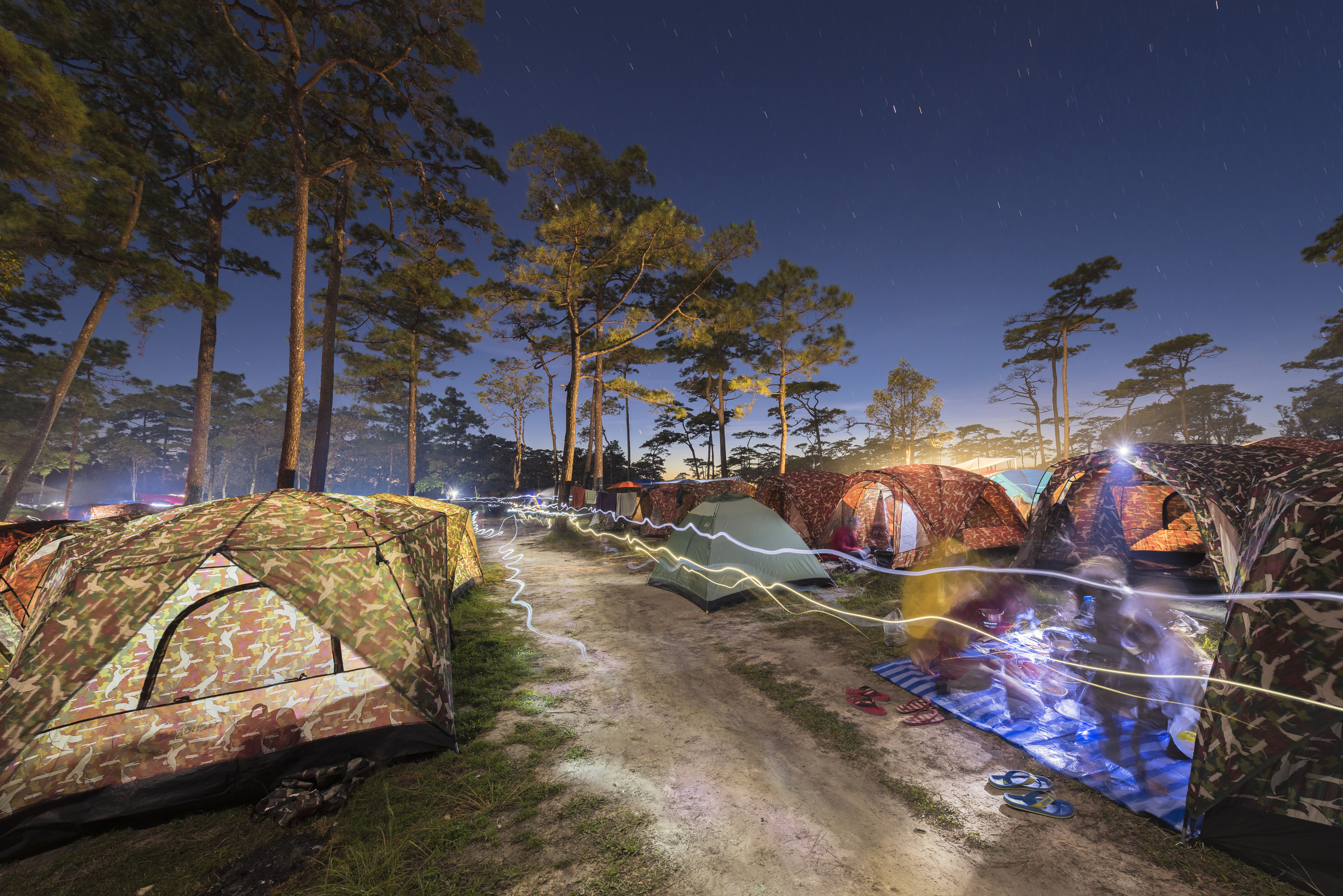
Phu Soi Dao National Park
