= Wang Thong subdistrict =

Coordinates: 16.81°N 100.43°E

Wang Thong วังทอง
- Subdistrict
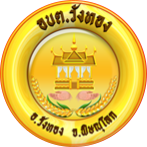
- Seal
- Interactive map of Wang Thong
- Country: Thailand
- Province: Phitsanulok
- District: Wang Thong

Government
  - Type: Subdistrict administrative organization (SAO)

Area
  - Total: 58 km^{2} (22 sq mi)

Population (2025)
  - Total: 17,974
  - Density: 310/km^{2} (800/sq mi)
- Time zone: UTC+7 (ICT)
- Postal code: 65130
- Calling code: 055
- ISO 3166 code: TH-650801
- LAO code: 06650802
- Website: www.wangthonglocal.go.th

Wang Thong (Thai: วังทอง) is a subdistrict (tambon) in Wang Thong district, in Phitsanulok province. It lies at the intersection of Highways 11 and 12, 17 kilometres (11 mi) east of Phitsanulok city and 380 kilometres (240 mi) north of Bangkok. The economy is based on farming and animal husbandry.

== History ==
Originally named Talat Chum, on 17 April 1939 it was renamed Wang Thong. On 30 March 1996 Wang Thong subdistrict administrative organization (SAO) was established.

== Geography ==
The topography of Wang Thong subdistrict is flat plains and is located in the lower northern part of Thailand. There are mountains in the northern part of the subdistrict, such as Khao Samo Khlaeng and Khao Fa. The subdistrict is bordered to the north by Samo Khae and Don Thong subdistricts, Mueang Phitsanulok district, to the east by Chaiyanam and Din Thong subdistricts, Wang Thong district, to the south by Wang Phikun subdistrict, Wang Thong district and to the west by Samo Khae subdistrict. The Wang Thong River (Khek River) is the main river flowing through the subdistrict. Bueng Rachanok is a popular tourist destination. The subdistrict lies in the Nan Basin, which is part of the Chao Phraya Watershed.

== Administration ==
=== Provincial government ===
The administration of Wang Thong subdistrict is responsible for an area that covers 58 square kilometres (22 sq mi) and consists of fifteen administrative villages, as of 2025: 17,974 people from 8,232 families.

Wang Thong subdistrict with villages

Village	English	Thai	People
-----	Ban Wang Thong	บ้านวังทอง	438
Moo1	Ban Wang Thong	บ้านวังทอง	1,667
Moo2	Ban Than Prong	บ้านตาลโปร่ง	861
Moo3	Ban Nam Duan	บ้านน้ำด้วน	1,337
Moo4	Ban Bang Saphan	บ้านบางสะพาน	1,083
Moo5	Ban Nong Suea	หนองเสือ	1,324
Moo6	Ban Bueng Rachanok	บ็งราชนก	1,253
M007	Ban Wang Phrom	บ้านวังพรม	1,162
Moo8	Ban Khao Samo Khlaeng	บ้านเขาสมอแคลง	2,782
Moo9	Ban Suea Lak Hang	บ้านเสือลากหาง	651
Moo10	Ban Don Muang	บ้านดอนม่วง	659
Moo11	Ban Rong Bom	บ้านโรงบ่ม	1,788
Moo12	Ban Wang Khrut	บ้านวังครุฑ	776
Noo13	Ban Nam Yen	บ้านน้ำเย็น	796
Moo14	Ban Nong Bon	บ้านหนองบอน	879
Moo15	Ban Si Thanoothit	บ้านศรีธนูทิศ	410

=== Local government ===
Wang Thong municipality is a subdistrict municipality (thesaban tambon), which covers tambon Moo1 (part east), Moo2 (Than Prong) and Moo3 (Nam Duan), with an area of 1.8 square kilometres (0.69 sq mi) with a population of 3,926 of 1,756 families.
Wang Thong administrative organization (Thai: องค์การบริหารส่วนตำบลวังทอง, romanized: ongkan borihan suan tambon wangthong - abbreviated Thai: อบต.วังทอง, romanized: o bo to wangthong) is responsible for the remaining area of the subdistrict, village Moo1 (part west) and Moo4 to Moo15, with an area of 56.2 square kilometres (21.7 sq mi) with a population of 14,048 of 6,476 families.

For FY2022, the revenues and expenditures of Wang Thong SAO were as follows:

Revenue of Wang Thong SAO per million baht
Total	Taxes, duties	Fees, fines	Property	Commerce	Varied	Subsidies	Others
68.6	32.7	0.7	0.4	0.0	0.1	34.7	0.0

Expenditure of Wang Thong SAO per million baht
Total	Central fund	Personnel	Operations	Investments	Subsidies	Others
50.7	19.4	16.4	8.9	1.4	4.6	0.0

The profit corresponds to 17.9 million baht (US$ 0.5 million).

== Temples ==
Wang Thong subdistrict is home to the following active temples, where Theravada Buddhism is practiced by local residents, of which nine Maha Nikai and one Dhammayut temples.

Temple name	Thai	Location
Wat Wang Thong Wararam	วัดวังทองวราราม	Moo1
Wat Bang Saphan	วัดบางสะพาน	Moo4
Wat Bueng Rachanok	วัดบึงราชนก	Moo6
Wat Wang Phrom	วัดวังพรม	Moo7
Wat Khlong Ruea	วัดคลองเรึอ	Moo8
Wat Ratchakiri Hiranyaram	วัดคีรีหิญยาราม	Moo8
Wat Phra Phutthabat Khao Samo Khlaeng	วัดพระพุทธบาทเขาสมอแคลง	Moo11
Wat Wachira Thammawas	วัดวชิรธรรมาวาส	Moo11
Wat Mongkon Nimit	วัดมงคลนิมิต	Moo14
Wat Si Sphon	วัดศรีโสภณ	Moo15

== Education ==
The following elementary/secondary schools are located in Wang Thong subdistrict.

- Wat Bang Saphan Prachanchananuson school - Moo4
- Bueng Ratchanok school - Moo6
- Ban Wang Phrom school - Moo7
- Ban Khao Samo Khlaeng school - Moo8
- Khuru Pracha Chanuthit school - Moo15

== Health ==
There is one community hospital Wang Thong Hospital in Moo5 with 68 beds.
There are two community health centers in Moo9 and Moo13.

== Transportation ==
The subdistrict is the intersection of highway 11 southbound (Nakhon Sawan route), highway 12 westbound (Tak route), highway 12 eastbound (Khon Kaen route) and bypass road 126, northern ring road of Phitsanulok.

== Radio ==
There is one radio station broadcast from Wang Thong, the Sathaanii Witthayu Ratthasaphaa (Parliament Radio Station). The frequency is 92.25 FM.Radio Stations in Phitsanulok Province, Thailand
