= Chai Nam =

Coordinates: 16.85°N 100.47°E

Chai Nam ชัยนาม
- Subdistrict
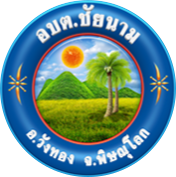
- Seal
- Interactive map of Chai Nam
- Country: Thailand
- Province: Phitsanulok
- District: Wang Thong

Government
  - Type: Subdistrict administrative organization (SAO)

Area
  - Total: 45.6 km^{2} (17.6 sq mi)

Population (2025)
  - Total: 6,190
  - Density: 137/km^{2} (350/sq mi)
- Time zone: UTC+7 (ICT)
- Postal code: 65130
- Calling code: 055
- ISO 3166 code: TH-650810
- LAO code: 06650806
- Website: www.chainam.go.th

Chai Nam (Thai: ชัยนาม) is a subdistrict in Wang Thong district, Phitsanulok province. It is connected to Highways 11 and 12. In 2025 it had a population of 6,190. The economy is mainly based on agriculture.

== Geography ==
The topography of Chai Nam subdistrict is lowland with mountainous areas in the northern parts of Moo1, Moo7 and Moo8 and part of Moo6. The southernmost part of Khao Noi–Khao Pradu Non-hunting Area is located in Moo1. In the national reserved forest are: north of highway 12 Wang Thong River Basin (forest right) and south of highway 12 Wang Thong River Basin (forest left). The subdistrict is located in the lower northern part of Thailand. The subdistrict is bordered to the north by Don Thong subdistrict, Mueang Phitsanulok district, to the east by Wang Nok Aen subdistrict, Wang Thong district, to the south by Din Thong subdistrict, Wang Thong district, to the west by Din Thong and Wang Thong subdistricts, Mueang Phitsanulok district. The Wang Thong River flows through the subdistrict and lies in the Nan Basin, which is part of the Chao Phraya Watershed. The subdistrict has connections with highway 12 and to the nearby highway 11.

== Administration ==
=== Provincial government ===
The administration of Chai Nam subdistrict is responsible for an area that covers 28,500 rai ~ 45.6 square kilometres (17.6 sq mi) and consists of nine administrative villages, as of 2025: 6,190 people of 2,478 families.

Chai Nam subdistrict with villages

Village	English	Thai	People
Moo1	Ban Chai Nam	บ้านไชยนาม	774
Moo2	Ban Wang Bon	บ้านวังบอน	924
Moo3	Ban Bueng Phrao	บ้านบึงพรัาว	911
Moo4	Ban Tha Prong	บ้านท่าโปร่ง	906
Moo5	Ban Tao It	บ้านเตาอิฐ	507
Moo6	Ban Sam Bon	น้ำนซำบอน	166
Moo7	Ban Noen Khli	บ้านเนินคลี	611
Moo8	Ban Rong Som Muang	บ้านรัองสัมมวง	789
Moo9	Ban Khlong Na Mueang	บ้านคลองนาเมื่ยง	602

=== Local government ===
Chai Nam is a subdistrict administrative organization - SAO (Thai: องค์การบริหารส่วนตำบลชัยนาม, romanized: ongkan borihan suan tambon Chai Nam, abbreviated: อบต.ชัยนาม, o bo toh Chai Nam), which covers the whole tambon Chai Nam.

For FY2022, the revenues and expenditures of Chai Nam SAO were as follows:

Revenue of Chai Nam SAO per million baht
Total	Taxes, duties	Fees, fines	Property	Commerce	Varied	Subsidies	Others
46.4	23.1	0.1	0.2	0.4	0.1	22.5	0.0

Expenditure of Chai Nam SAO per million baht
Total	Central fund	Personnel	Operations	Investments	Subsidies	Others
38.6	13.9	11.0	8.7	3.0	2.0	0.0

The profit corresponds to 7.8 million baht (US$ 0.2 million).

== Temples ==
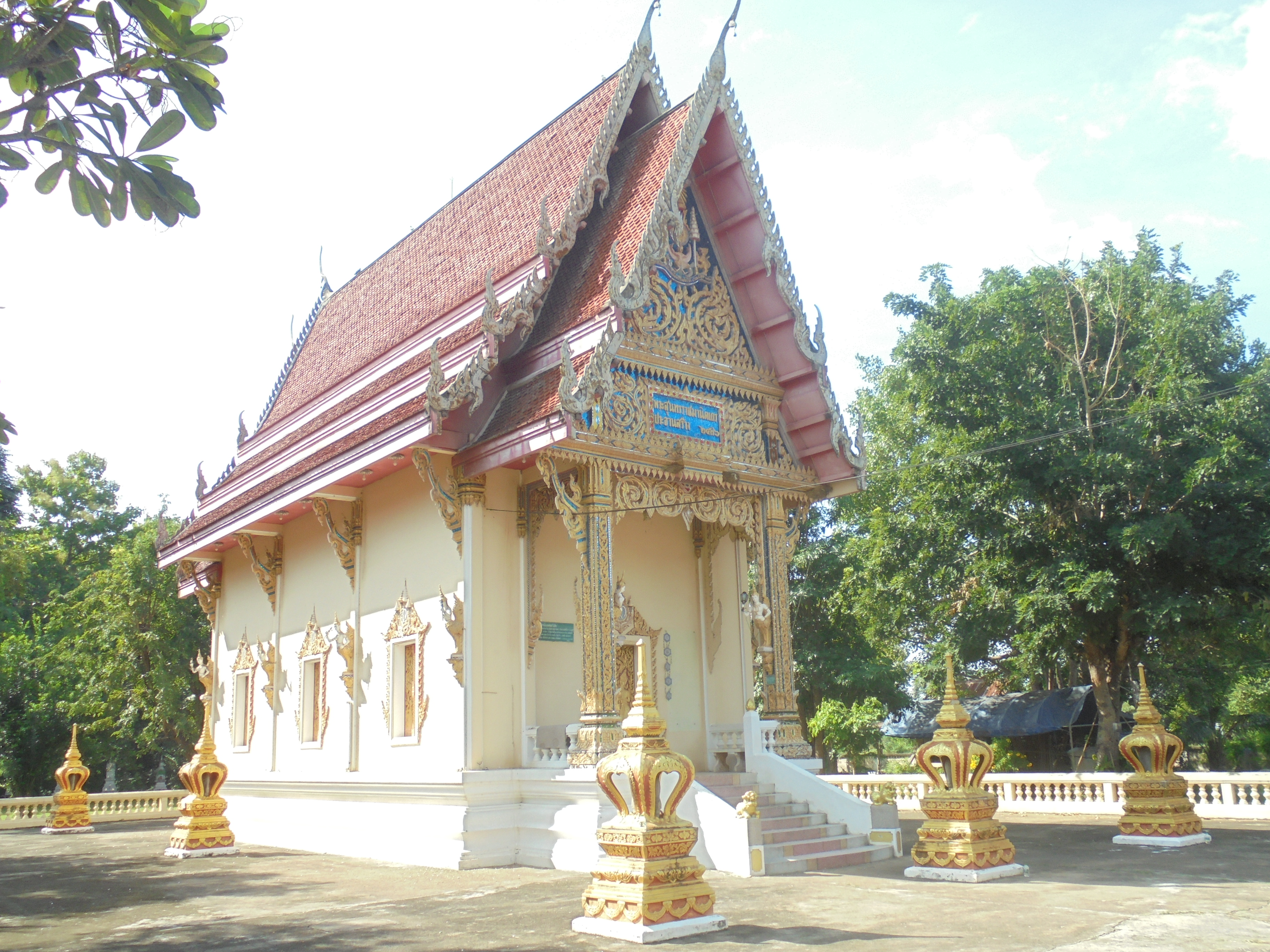
Ubosot of Wat Bueng Phrao

Chai Nam subdistrict is home to the following active temples, where Theravada Buddhism is practiced by local residents.

Temple name	Thai	Location
Wat Chaiyanam	วัดไชยนาม	Moo1
Wat Koh Kaew Prachanurak	วัดเกาะแก้วประชานุรักษ์	Moo2
Wat Bueng Phrao	วัดบึงพร้าว	Moo3
Wat Nen Noi	วัดเณรนเอย	Moo3

== Economy ==
The majority of people, about 80 percent, work in agriculture: growing rice, fruit orchards and vegetable crops.

== Education ==
The following elementary/secondary schools are located in Chai Nam.

- Rat Upatham school - Moo2
- Ban Bueng Phrao school - Moo7
- Wang Thong Phithayakhom school - Moo7

== Healthcare ==
There is Chai Nam health-promoting hospital in Moo3.

== Transportation ==
The subdistrict is connected to highways 11 southbound (Nakhon Sawan route), 12 westbound (Tak route) and 12 eastbound (Khon Kaen route).
