= Samo Khae =

Coordinates: 16.8408°N 100.3415°E

Samo Khae สมอแข
- Tambon
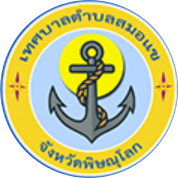
- Seal
- Interactive map of Samo Khae
- Country: Thailand
- Province: Phitsanulok
- District: Mueang Phitsanulok

Government
  - Type: Subdistrict Municipality

Area
  - Total: 40.19 km^{2} (15.52 sq mi)

Population (December 2025)
  - Total: 16,017
  - Density: 398/km^{2} (1,030/sq mi)
- Time zone: UTC+7 (ICT)
- Postcode: 65000
- Calling code: 055
- ISO 3166 code: TH-65010700
- LAO code: 05650121
- Website: www.samokhae.go.th

Samo Khae (Thai: สมอแข) is a subdistrict in the Mueang Phitsanulok District of Phitsanulok Province, Thailand. In 2025 it had a population of 16,017 and 9,142 households.

== Geography ==
The topography of Samo Khae is fertile lowlands with an area of 40.19 km^{2} and lies east of the Nan river. The subdistrict is bordered to the north by Don Thong subdistrict, to the east by Wang Thong subdistrict of Wang Thong district, to the south by Wang Phikun subdistrict of Wang Thong district, and to the west by Aranyik subdistrict and Hua Ro subdistrict. Samo Khae subdistrict lies in the Nan Basin, which is part of the Chao Phraya Watershed.

== History ==
Originally, Samo Khae subdistrict was divided into five administrative villages: Moo1 Ban Nong Tho, Moo2 Ban Ladlak Bua Khao, Moo3 Ban Dong Pradok-Krommethan, Moo4 Ban Samo Khae and Moo5 Ban Go.
Samo Khae Subdistrict Administrative Organization-SAO (ongkan borihan suan tambon) was established, published 19 January 1996 in Royal Thai Government Gazette, but effective 30 March 1996.
In 1998, Ban Noen Makhuek (Moo6) was separated from Ban Ladlak Bua Khao (Moo2).
In 2001 Ban Krommethan-Dong Pradok (Moo3) was split into three villages: Ban Dong Pradok (Moo3), Ban Phong Sathon-Chinlap (Moo7) and Ban Krommethan-Chatkaew (Moo8).
In 2025, Moo7 Ban Phong Sathon-Chinlap splits into three villages: Moo7 Ban Phong Sathon-Chinlap, Moo9 Ban Chinlap and Moo10 Ban Indochine.
Since the start of the year 2026 Samo Khae SAO is upgraded to Samo Khae subdistrict municipality.

== Administration ==
=== Provincial government ===
The administration of Samo Khae subdistrict is responsible for an area that covers 40.19 km^{2} and consists of ten administrative villages, as of December 2025: 16,017 people and 9,142 households.

Samo Khae subdistrict with villages

Village	English	Thai	People	Households
Moo1	Ban Nong Tho	บ้านนองตอ	1,326	713
Moo2	Ban Lat Bua Khao	บ้านลาดบัวขาว	2,437	1,196
Moo3	Ban Dong Pradok	บ้านดงประโดก	1,821	812
Moo4	Ban Samo Khae	บ้านสมอแข	1,743	998
Moo5	Ban Go	บ้านก่อ	446	287
Moo6	Ban Noen Makhuek	บ้านเนินมะคึก	943	384
Moo7	Ban Phong Sathon-Chinlap	บ้านพงศธร-ชินลาภ	1,216	679
Moo8	Ban Krommethan-Chatkaew	บ้านกรมธรรม์-ฉัตรแก้ว	2,223	1,298
M009	Ban Chinlap	บ้านชินลาภ	2,977	1,969
Moo10	Ban Indochine	บ้านอินโดจิน	885	806

Administrative villages contain many villages such as:

- M004 - Montha Thong
- Moo10 - Indochina View Point, Prueksa Thara and Supaporn Resort 2

=== Local government ===
Samo Khae subdistrict municipality (Thai: เทศบาลตำบลสมอแข, romanized: thesaban tambon Samo Khae) covers the whole Samo Khae subdistrict.

== Logo ==
The logo of Samo Khae subdistrict municipality shows an anchor (solidarity), a rope (unity) and a moon (prosperity).

== Temples ==
Samo Khae subdistrict is home to the following active temples, where Theravada Buddhism is practiced by local residents:

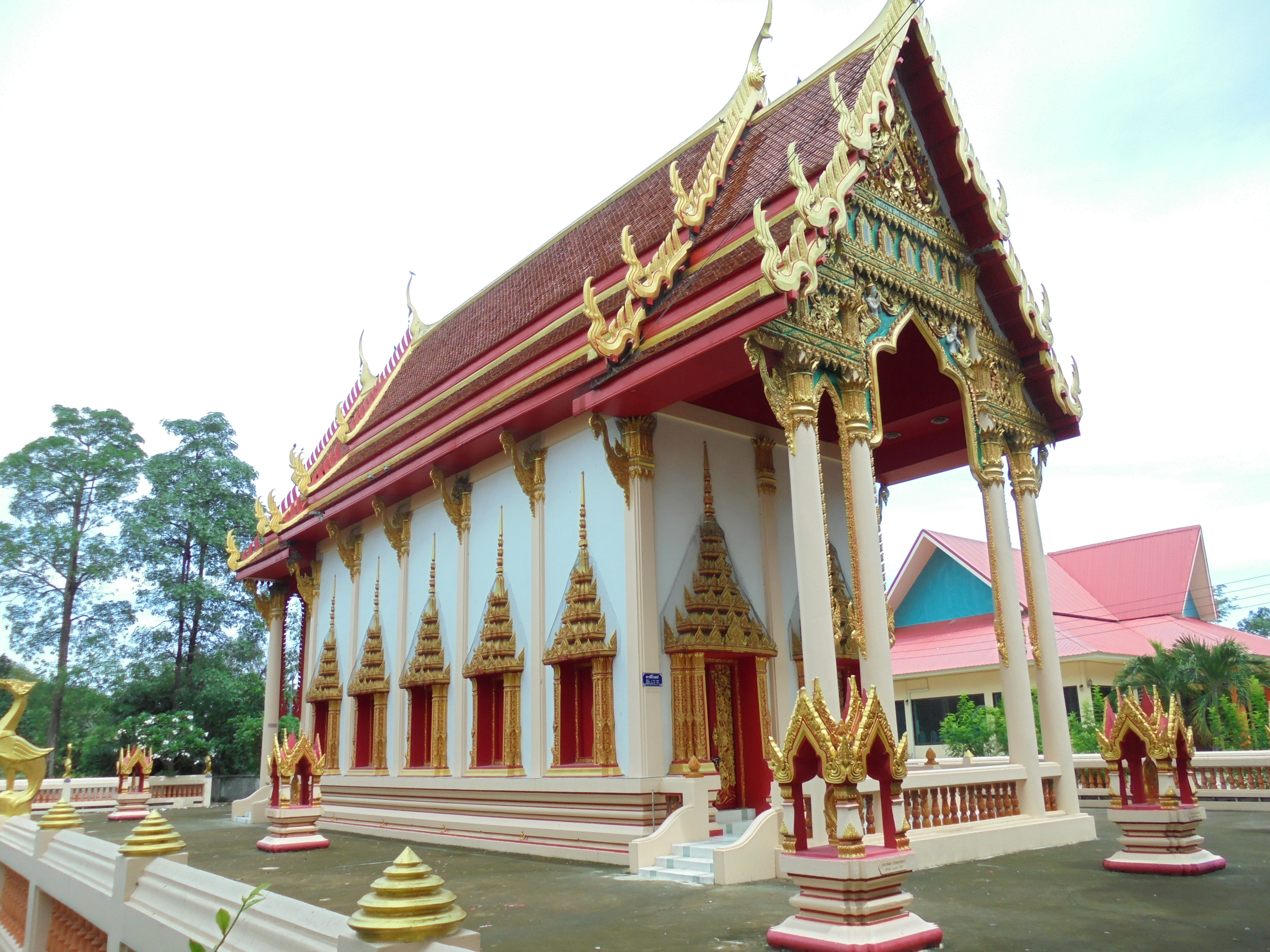
Wat Krommethan

Temple name	Thai	Location
Wat Sala Song Phi Nong	วัดศาลสองพี่น้อง	Moo1
Wat Lat Bua Khao	วัดลาดบ้วขาว	Moo2
Wat Si Wanaram	วัดศรีวนาราม	Moo3
Wat Samo Khae	วัดสมอแข	Moo4
Wat Noen Makhuek	วัดเนินมะคึก	Moo6
Wat Krommethan	วัดกรมธรรม์	Moo8

In Samo Khae subdistrict (Moo1) there is a Chinese shrine to worship Guan Yu.
File:Guan Yu Shrine001, Phitsanulok.jpg

== Economy ==
ฺBecause the land is suitable for agriculture, most people work in this sector. The following companies also play a role in the employment service: CPF factory, Kaset Phattana Industry, Makro Phitsanulok 2 and Thai Watsadu Phitsanulok.

== Government institutions ==
The following government institutions in Samo Khae subdistrict are:

- Phitsanulok Provincial Administrative Organization (PPAO) - Moo4.
- Phitsanulok Provincial Industrial Office - Moo4.
- Provincial Electricity Authority (PEA) area 2 - Moo7.
- King Baromma Trailokkanat Camp (Royal Thai Army) - Moo2.
- Highway Police Station 3 Division 5 - Moo4.

== Infrastructure ==
=== Education ===
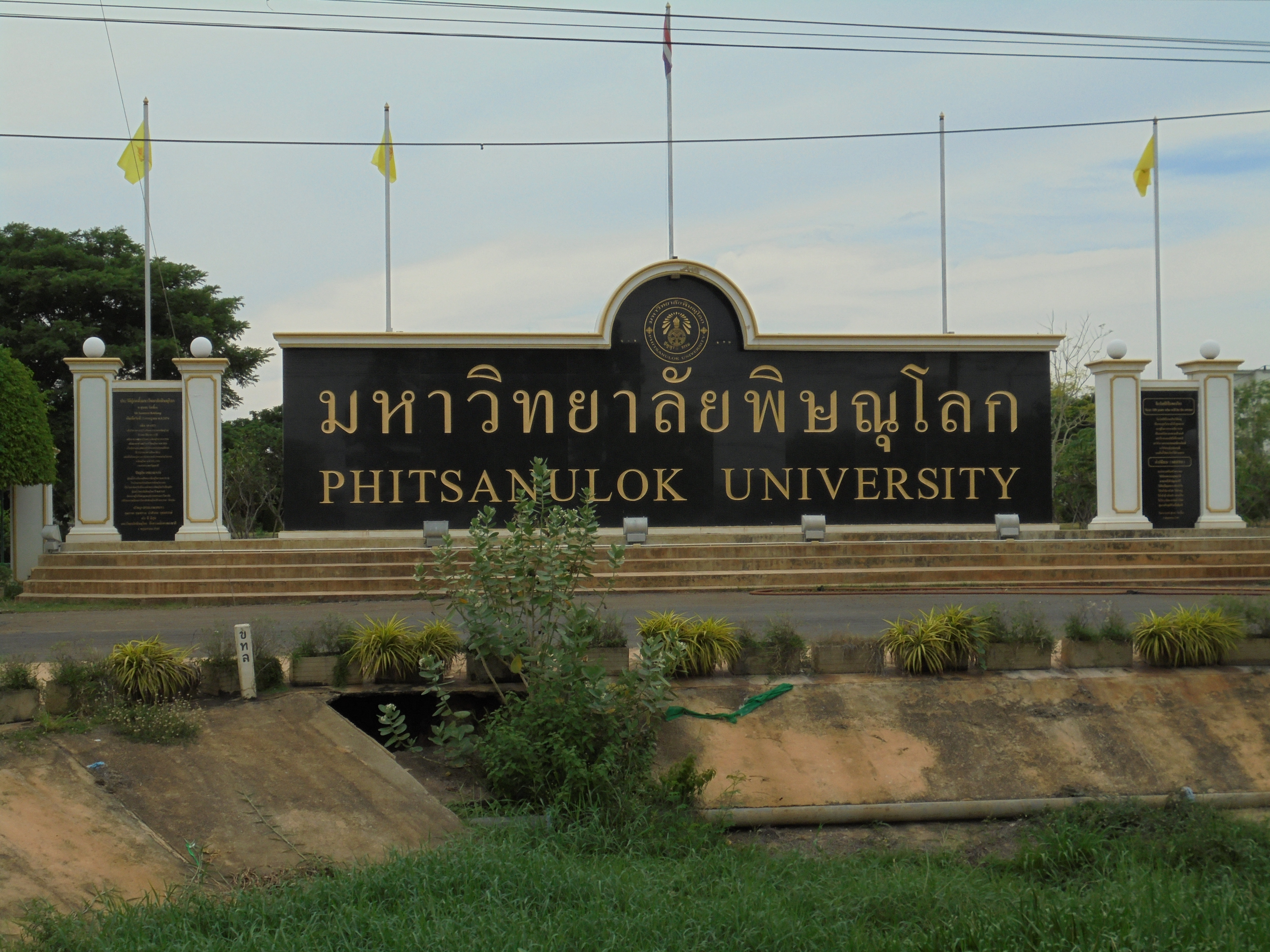
Phitsanulok University

==== Higher education ====
Phitsanulok University is a private university - Moo5.

- Faculty of Business and Accountancy
- Faculty of Law
- Faculty of Liberal Arts and Education
- Faculty of Public Administration
- Faculty of Public Health

==== Primary/secondary education ====
- New Cambridge International school - Moo3.
- Teeratada Phitsanulok school - Moo3.
- Wat Krommethan school - Moo3.
- Wat Si Wanaram school - Moo3.
- Wat Samo Khae school - Moo4.
- Wat Noen Makhuek school - Moo6.

==== Child development center ====
- Samo Khae SAO child development center.
- Noen Makhuek child development center.

=== Healthcare ===
There is Samo Khae health-promoting hospital in Ban Dong Pradok (Moo3).

=== Transportation ===
==== Roads ====
Major roads are:

- Highway 11, Phitsanulok-Uttaradit route.
- Highway 12, Phitsanulok-Lom Sak route.
- Bypass road 126, northern ring road of Phitsanulok, starts at junction CP.
- Bypass road 126, southern ring road of Phitsanulok, starts at intersection Indochina (old name Rong Pho).
  Because the intersection Indochina is a transportation hub in the connection between Myanmar-Thailand-Laos-Vietnam, East-West-Economic Corridor (EWEC), it was expanded in 2019 with a flyover and a roundabout to avoid a waiting time of three minutes at traffic lights.

==== Buses and taxis ====
From bus station no.2 buses provide mass transport through Phitsanulok province. Connection to Bangkok and cities of northern Thailand (except Mae Hong Son province) and northern northeastern Thailand is via direct bus routes daily and at night. All these bus routes are offered by eight bus companies, such as Esantour, Kingdom tour, Nakhonchai Air, Phet Prasert, Sombat tour and Win Tour Phitsanulok. Phet Prasert also has direct bus lines to eastern Thailand (Pattaya and Chanthaburi). Piya Chai Pattana offers a direct bus line to the south of Thailand (Hat Yai, Ko Samui, Phang Nga, Phuket and Surat Thani).
There are taxis with the necessary meters; motorcycle taxis and tuk-tuk tricycle taxis with negotiated rates.

=== Electricity ===
All households in Samo Khae subdistrict have access to the electricity network.

=== Communications ===
80 percent of all households in Samo Khae subdistrict have access to the fixed and mobile telephone network.

=== Waterworks ===
All households in Samo Khae subdistrict have access to the water network of Provincial Waterworks Authority (PWA).

== Culture ==
Watthanathai-Yuan (thai:ว้ฒนธรรมไท-ยวน) is a culture conservation center of Thai-Yuan club in Moo3. The purpose is to preserve maintain customs, arts, culture and local wisdom with the Samo Khae subdistrict.
