= Nong Phra =

Coordinates: 16.976°N 100.56°E

Nong Phra หนองพระ
- Subdistrict
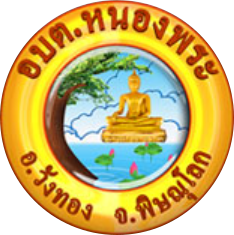
- Seal
- Interactive map of Nong Phra
- Country: Thailand
- Province: Phitsanulok
- District: Wang Thong

Government
  - Type: Subdistrict administrative organization (SAO)

Area
  - Total: 60.7 km^{2} (23.4 sq mi)

Population (2025)
  - Total: 6,672
  - Density: 110/km^{2} (280/sq mi)
- Time zone: UTC+7 (ICT)
- Postal code: 65130
- Calling code: 055
- ISO 3166 code: TH-650809
- LAO code: 06650812
- Website: www.nongpra.go.th

Nong Phra (Thai: หนองพระ) is a subdistrict in Wang Thong district, Phitsanulok province. The subdistrict is lowland. In 2025 it had a population of 6,672. The economy is mainly based on agriculture.

== Geography ==
The topography of Nong Phra subdistrict is lowland, sloping from north to southwest. The subdistrict is bordered to the north by Din Thong subdistrict, Wang Thong district, to the east by Tha Muen Ram subdistrict, Wang Thong district, to the south by Phan Chali subdistrict, Wang Thong district and Wat Ta Yom substrict, Bang Krathum district, to the west by Nakhon Pa Mak subdistrict, Bang Krathum district and Mae Raka subdistrict, Wang Thong district. Highway 11 southbound (Nakhon Sawan route) and northbound (Wang Thong route) runs through the subdistrict. Buildings are mainly found along this highway.

== History ==
On 19 January 1996 Ministry of Interior announced the establishment of Nong Phra Subdistrict Administrative Organization - SAO (ongkan borihan suan tambon). On 30 January 1996 it was published in Government Gazette, volume 113, section 9 Ngor. This was effective from 30 March 1996.

== Economy ==
The economy of Nong Phra subdistrict depends on rice farming and field crops.

== Administration ==
=== Provincial government ===
The administration of Nong Phra subdistrict is responsible for an area that covers 37,936 rai ~ 60.7 square kilometres (23.4 sq mi) and consists of twelve administrative villages, as of 2025: 6,672 people of 2,717 families.

Nong Phra subdistrict with villages

Village	English	Thai	People
Moo1	Ban Sadao	บ้านสะเดา	1,058
Moo2	Ban Khlong Rae	บ้านคลองแร่	240
Moo3	Ban Nong Phra	บ้านหนองพระ	801
Moo4	Ban Dong Phluang	บ้านดงพลวง	700
Moo5	Ban Charoen Phon	บ้านเจริญผล	629
Moo6	Ban Nong Pho Thale	น้ำนหนองโพทะเล	352
Moo7	Ban Nong Bua	บ้านหนองบัว	624
Moo8	Ban Dong Taeng	บ้านดงแตง	325
Moo9	Ban Nong Faek	บ้านหนองแฝก	381
Moo10	Ban Sadao Noi	น้ำนสะเดาน้อย	337
Moo11	Ban Sadao Tai	บ้านสะเดาใต้	946
Moo12	Ban Phathana	บ้านพัฒนาทร	279

=== Local government ===
Nong Phra is a subdistrict administrative organization - SAO (Thai: องค์การบริหารส่วนตำบลหนองพระ, romanized: ongkan borihan suan tambon Nong Phra, abbreviated: อบต.หนองพระ, o bo toh Nong Phra), which covers the whole subdistrict Nong Phra.

For FY2022, the revenues and expenditures of Nong Phra SAO were as follows:

Revenue of Nong Phra SAO per million baht
Total	Taxes, duties	Fees, fines	Property	Commerce	Varied	Subsidies	Others
49.1	26.5	0.1	0.1	0.3	0.1	22.0	0.0

Expenditure of Nong Phra SAO per million baht
Total	Central fund	Personnel	Operations	Investments	Subsidies	Others
36.3	14.7	10.8	5.4	3.4	2.0	0.0

The profit corresponds to 12.8 million baht (US$0.4 million).

== Temples ==
Nong Phra subdistrict is home to the following active temples, where Theravada Buddhism is practiced by local residents of which six Maha Nikai and one Dhammayut temples.

Temple name	Thai	Location
Wat Sadao	วัดสะเดา	Moo1
Wat Bua Thong	วัดบัวทอง	Moo3
Wat Charoen Phon	วัดเจริญผล	Moo4
Wat Pa Si Thawon	วัดป่าศรีถาวร	Moo5
Wat Nong Bua	วัดหนองบ้ว	Moo7
Wat Dong Taeng	วัดดงแตง	Moo8
Wat Nong Faek	วัดหนองแฝก	Moo9

== Education ==
The following elementary/secondary schools are located in Nong Phra subdistrict.

- Ban Sadao school - Moo1
- Ban Nong Phra school - Moo3
- Nong Phra Pittaya school - Moo3
- Ban Charoen Phon school - Moo5

== Healthcare ==
There is Nong Phra health-promoting hospital in Moo3.
