= Din Thong =

Coordinates: 16.76°N 100.42°E

Din Thong ดินทอง
- Subdistrict
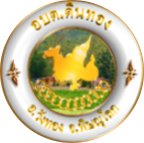
- Seal
- Interactive map of Din Thong
- Country: Thailand
- Province: Phitsanulok
- District: Wang Thong

Government
  - Type: Subdistrict administrative rganization (SAO)

Area
  - Total: 63.8 km^{2} (24.6 sq mi)

Population (2025)
  - Total: 6,409
  - Density: 100/km^{2} (260/sq mi)
- Time zone: UTC+7 (ICT)
- Postal code: 65130
- Calling code: 055
- ISO 3166 code: TH-650811
- LAO code: 06650807
- Website: www.dinthong.go.th

Din Thong (Thai: ดินทอง) is a subdistrict in Wang Thong district, Phitsanulok province. The subdistrict is a plain area with one hill. In 2025 it had a population of 6,409. The economy is mainly based on agriculture.

== Geography ==
The topography of Din Thong subdistrict is a plain area, except Moo10 is a hill. The subdistrict is bordered to the north by Wang Thong and Chai Nam subdistricts, Wang Thong district, to the east by Wang Nok Aen and Tha Muen Ram subdistricts, Wang Thong district, to the south by Nong Phra subdistrict, Wang Thong district and to the west by Wang Phikun and Wang Thong subdistricts, Wang Thong district. Highway 11 southbound (Nakhon Sawan route) and northbound (Wang Thong route) runs through the subdistrict.

== History ==
On 19 January 1996 Ministry of Interior announced the establishment of Din Thong Subdistrict administrative organization - SAO (ongkan borihan suan tambon). On 30 January 1996 it was published in Government Gazette, volume 113, section 9 Ngor, no.1148. This was effective from 30 March 1996.

== Economy ==
The economy of Din Thong subdistrict depends on agriculture, such as breeding seedlings, corn farming, oil farming and fruit orchards.

== Administration ==
=== Provincial government ===
The administration of Din Thong subdistrict is responsible for an area that covers 39,883 rai ~ 63.8 square kilometres (24.6 sq mi) and consists of eleven administrative villages, as of 2025: 6,409 people of 2,785 families.

Village	English	Thai	People
Moo1	Ban Khlong Ta Khong	บ้านคลองตาคง	954
Moo2	Ban Sam Toei	บ้านซำเตย	1,141
Moo3	Ban Din Thong	บ้านดินทอง	668
Moo4	Ban Nong Tabaek	บ้านหนองตะแบก	360
Moo5	Ban Nong Tao	บ้านหนองเต่า	275
Moo6	Ban Mai Din Thong	น้ำนใหม่ดินทอง	370
Moo7	Ban Laem Muang	บ้านแหลมม่วง	491
Moo8	Ban Mai Kok Mai Daeng	บ้านใหม่กกไม้แดง	645
Moo9	Ban Kok Mai Daeng	บ้านกกไม้แดง	840
Moo10	Ban Khao Kop	น้ำนเขากบ	332
Moo11	Ban Din Thong Phatthana	บ้านดินทองพัฒนา	333

=== Local government ===
Din Thong is a subdistrict administrative organization - SAO (Thai: องค์การบริหารส่วนตำบลดินทอง, romanized: ongkan borihan suan tambon Din Thong, abbreviated: อบต.ดินทอง, o bo toh Din Thong), which covers the whole subdistrict Din Thong.

For FY2022, the revenues and expenditures of Din Thong SAO were as follows:

Revenue of Din Thong SAO per million baht
Total	Taxes, duties	Fees, fines	Property	Commerce	Varied	Subsidies	Others
57.0	25.1	0.1	0.3	0.0	0.1	22.3	9.1

Expenditure of Din Thong SAO per million baht
Total	Central fund	Personnel	Operations	Investments	Subsidies	Others
36.2	13.3	9.1	7.2	5.2	1.4	0.0

The profit corresponds to 20.8 million baht (US$ 0.6 million).

== Temples ==
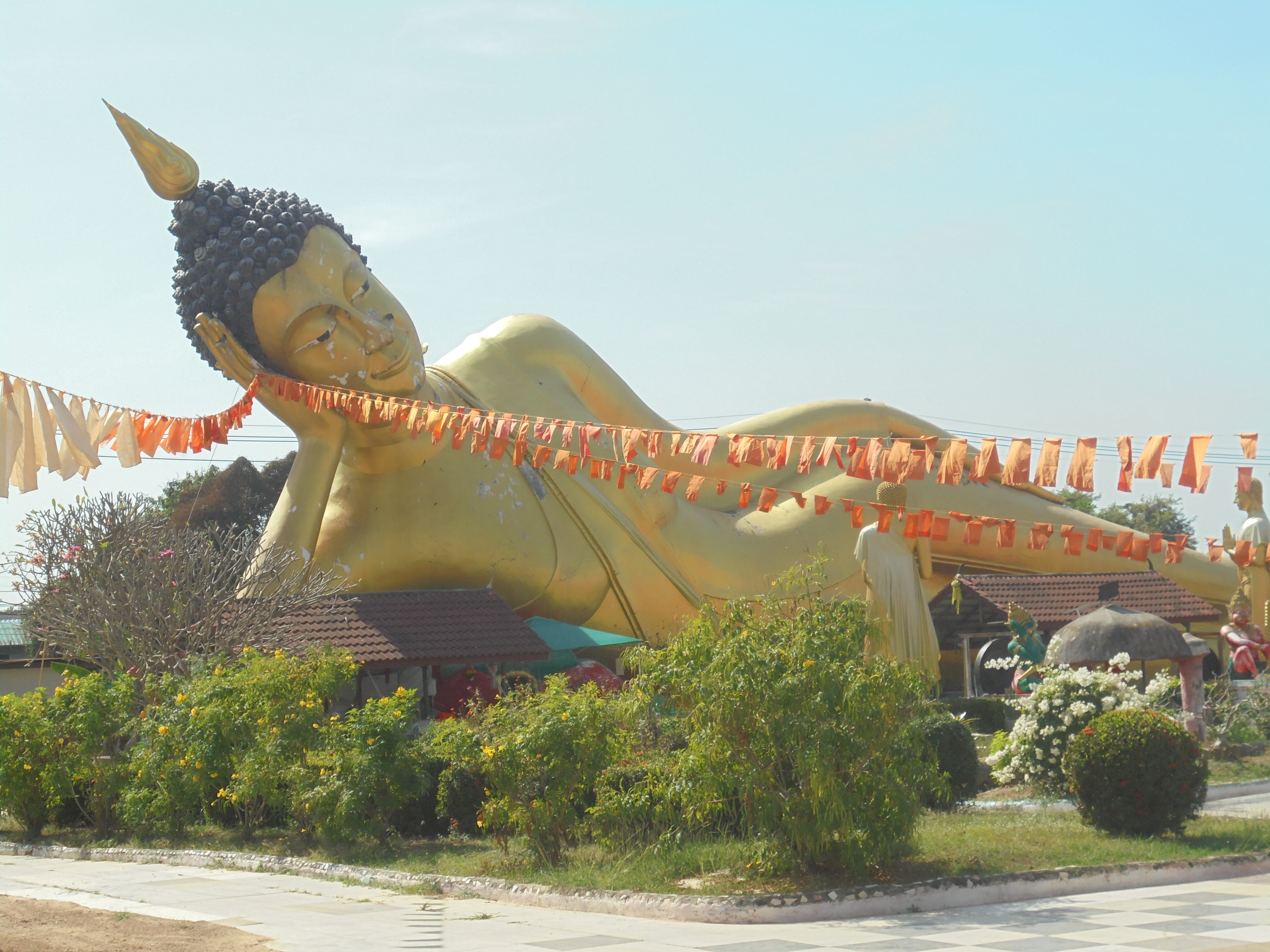
Reclining Buddha - Wat Kok Mai Daeng

Din Thong subdistrict is home to the following active temples, where Theravada Buddhism is practiced by local residents.

Temple name	Thai	Location
Wat Mai Sam Toei	วัดใหม่ซำเตย	Moo2
Wat Sam Toei	วัดซำเตย	Moo2
Wat Din Thong	วัดดินทอง	Moo3
Wat Kok Mai Daeng	วัดกกไม้แดง	Moo9

== Education ==
The following elementary/secondary schools are located in Din Thong subdistrict.

- Ban Sam Toei school - Moo2
- Ban Din Thong school - Moo3
- Ban Kok Mai Daeng school - Moo5

== Healthcare ==
There is Din Thong health-promoting hospital in Moo3.
