= Mae Raka =

Coordinates: 16.71°N 100.37°E

Mae Raka แม่ระกา
- Subdistrict
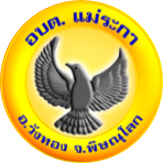
- Seal
- Interactive map of Mae Raka
- Country: Thailand
- Province: Phitsanulok
- District: Wang Thong

Government
  - Type: Subdistrict administrative organization (SAO)

Area
  - Total: 85 km^{2} (33 sq mi)

Population (2025)
  - Total: 6,908
  - Density: 81/km^{2} (210/sq mi)
- Time zone: UTC+7 (ICT)
- Postal code: 65130
- Calling code: 055
- ISO 3166 code: TH-650803
- LAO code: 06650804
- Website: www.maeraka.go.th

Mae Raka (Thai: แม่ระกา) is a subdistrict in Wang Thong district, Phitsanulok province. It is connected to Highway 11. In 2025 it had a population of 6,908. The economy is mainly based on agriculture and animal husbandry.

== Geography ==
The topography of Mae Raka subdistrict is flat plains and is located in the lower northern part of Thailand. The subdistrict is bordered to the north by Wang Phikun subdistrict, Wang Thong district, to the east by Nong Phra subdistrict, Wang Thong district, to the south by Bang Rakam district, to the west by Mueang Phitsanulok district. The Wang Thong River flows west of the subdistrict and lies in the Nan Basin, which is part of the Chao Phraya Watershed. The subdistrict has connections to the nearby highway 11 northbound (Wang Thong route) and southbound (Nakhon Sawan route).

== History ==
On 28 April 1996 Mae Raka subdistrict administrative organization (SAO) was established.

== Administration ==
=== Provincial government ===
The administration of Mae Raka subdistrict is responsible for an area that covers 53,142 rai ~ 85 square kilometres (33 sq mi) and consists of 15 administrative villages, as of 2025: 6,908 people and 2,614 families.

Mae Raka subdistrict with villages

Village	English	Thai	People
Moo1	Ban Thaew	บ้านแถว	644
Moo2	Ban Mae Raka	บ้านแม่ระกา	850
Moo3	Ban Nong Ta Rueang	บ้านหนองตาเรือง	372
Moo4	Ban Khek	บ้านเข็ก	730
Moo5	Ban Tham Tao	ถ้ำเต่า	283
Moo6	Ban Nam Khong Nuea	น้ำโค้งเหนือ	741
Moo7	Ban Laem Du	บ้านแหลมดู่	357
Moo8	Ban Wang Nam Sai	บ้านวังน้ำใส	505
Moo9	Ban Nong Phak Wan	บ้านหนองผักหวาน	200
Moo10	Ban Nong Bot	บ้านหนองโบสถ์	313
Moo11	Ban Laem Khak	บ้านแหลมคัก	313
Moo12	Ban Dong	บ้านดง	220
Moo13	Ban Bueng Pan	บ้านบึงปัน	635
Moo14	Ban Thung Yai	บ้านทุ่งใหญ่	258
Moo15	Mae Raka Phatana	บ้านแม่ระกาพัฒนา	487

=== Local government ===
Mae Raka is a subdistrict administrative organization - SAO (Thai: องค์การบริหารส่วนตำบลแม่ระกาฅ, romanized: ongkan borihan suan tambon Mae Raka, abbreviated: อบต.แม่ระกา, o bo toh Mae Raka), which covers the whole tambon Mae Raka.

For FY2022, the revenues and expenditures of Mae Raka SAO were as follows:

Revenue of Mae Raka SAO per million baht
Total	Taxes, duties	Fees, fines	Property	Commerce	Varied	Subsidies	Others
65.8	24.8	0.1	0.2	0.0	0.1	34.1	6.6

Expenditure of Mae Raka SAO per million baht
Total	Central fund	Personnel	Operations	Investments	Subsidies	Others
41.4	16.3	11.2	8.1	3.0	2.8	0.0

The profit corresponds to 24.4 million baht (US$ 0.7 million).

== Temples ==
Mae Raka subdistrict is home to the following active temples, where Theravada Buddhism is practiced by local residents.

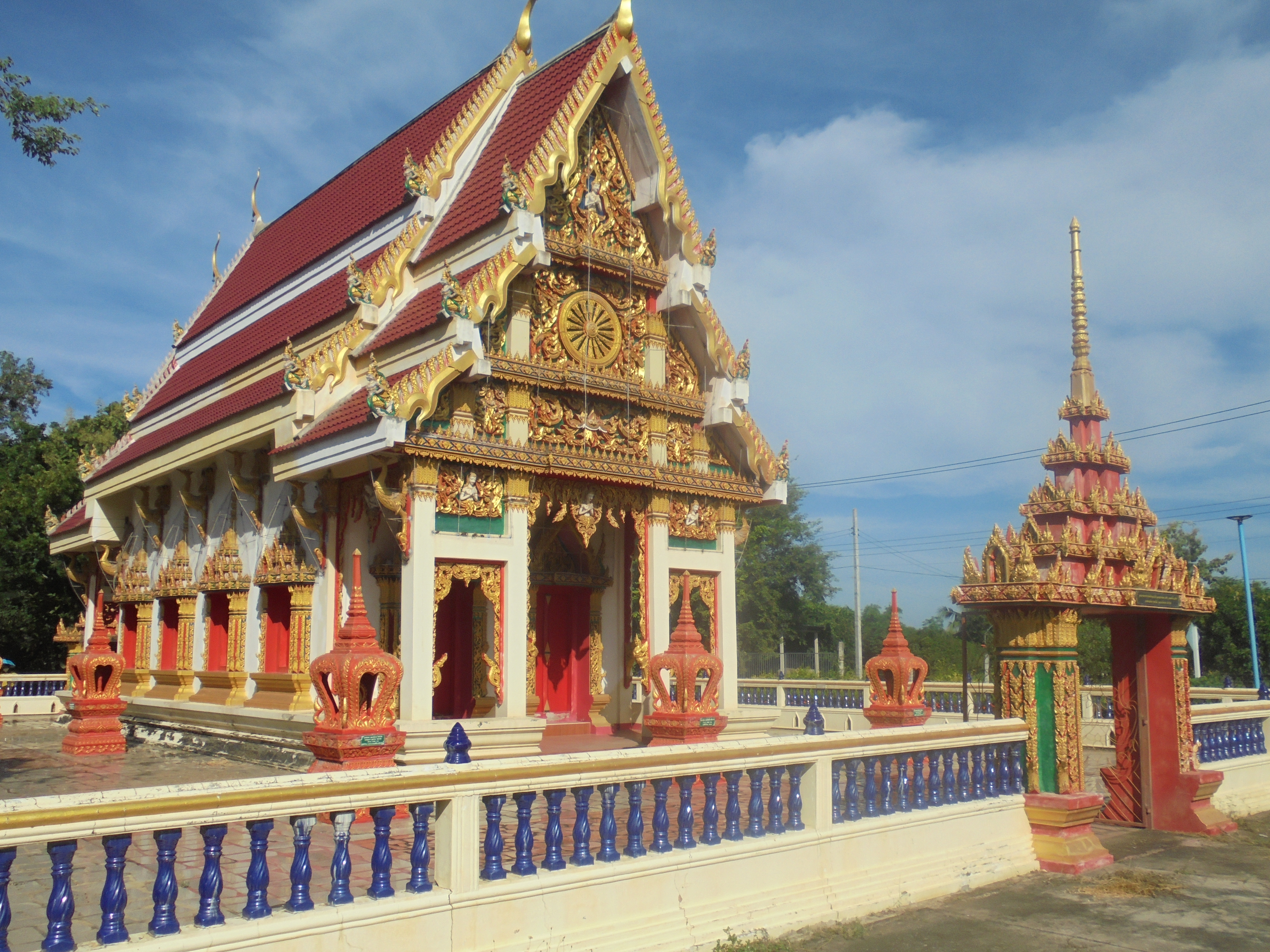
Ubosot of Wat Wang Nam Sai

Temple name	Thai	Location
Wat Ban Thaew	วัดบ้านแถว	Moo1
Wat Nong Ta Rueang	วัดหนองตาเรือง	Moo3
Wat Ban Khek	วัดบ้านเข็ก	Moo4
Wat Wang Nam Sai	วัดวังน้ำใส	Moo8
Wat Wang Waree Si Satthatham	วัดวังวารีศรีศรัทธาถรรม	Moo8
Wat Nong Bot	วัดหนองโบสถ์	Moo10
Wat Sa Thong Samakkhee	วัดสะทองสามัคคี	Moo12
Wat Mae Raka	วัดแม่ระกา	Moo15

== Economy ==
Most of the population worked in agriculture and animal husbandry.

- agriculture - 65%
- animal husbandry - 20%
- other - 15%

== Education ==
The following elementary/secondary schools are located in Mae Raka.

=== Primary/secondary education ===
- Ban Nong Ta Rueang school - Moo3
- Ban Khek school - Moo4
- Ban Tham Tao school - Moo5
- Ban Thaew Wang Nam Sai school - Moo8
- Ban Mae Raka school - Moo15

== Healthcare ==
There are Mae Raka and Ban Wang Nam Sai health-promoting hospitals in Moo2 and Moo8.
