= Wang Phikun, Phitsanulok =

Coordinates: 16.76°N 100.35°E

Wang Phikun วังพิกุล
- Subdistrict
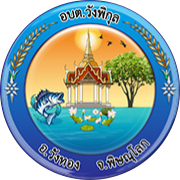
- Seal
- Interactive map of Wang Phikun
- Country: Thailand
- Province: Phitsanulok
- District: Wang Thong

Government
  - Type: Subdistrict administrative organization (SAO)

Area
  - Total: 70.5 km^{2} (27.2 sq mi)

Population (2025)
  - Total: 9,035
  - Density: 128/km^{2} (330/sq mi)
- Time zone: UTC+7 (ICT)
- Postal code: 65130
- Calling code: 055
- ISO 3166 code: TH-650805
- LAO code: 06650811
- Website: www.wangpikul.go.th

Wang Phikun (Thai: วังพิกุล) is a subdistrict in Wang Thong district, Phitsanulok province. It is connected to Highways 11, 12 and 126. In 2025 it had a population of 9,035. The economy is mainly based on agriculture and animal husbandry.

== Geography ==
The topography of Wang Phikun subdistrict is flat plains and is located in the lower northern part of Thailand. The subdistrict is bordered to the north by Samo Khae subdistrict, Mueang Phitsanulok district and Wang Thong subdistrict, to the east by Din Thong subdistrict, Wang Thong district, to the south by Mae Raka subdistrict, Wang Thong district, to the west by Aranyik and Bueng Phra subdistricts, Mueang Phitsanulok district. The Wang Thong River flows through the subdistrict and lies in the Nan Basin, which is part of the Chao Phraya Watershed. The subdistrict has connections to the nearby highway 11, highway 12 and 126 (Phitsanulok bypass).

== Administration ==
=== Provincial government ===
The administration of Wang Phikun subdistrict is responsible for an area that covers 44,037 rai ~ 70.5 square kilometres (27.2 sq mi) and consists of 15 administrative villages, as of 2025: 9,035 people and 3,736 families.

Wang Phikun subdistrict with villages

Village	English	Thai	People
Moo1	Ban Wang Pradu	บ้านวังประดู่	503
Moo2	Ban Wang Phikun	บ้านวังพิกุล	770
Moo3	Ban Dong Khoi	บ้านดงข่อย	1,150
Moo4	Ban Khlong Pet	บ้านคลองเป็ด	859
Moo5	Ban Thang Lat	บ้านทางลัด	362
Moo6	Ban Khlong Mueang	น้ำคลองเมือง	912
Moo7	Ban Dong Phluang	บ้านดงพลวง	756
Moo8	Ban Wang Samrong	บ้านวังสำโรง	446
Moo9	Ban Dong Phai	บ้านดงไผ่	290
Moo10	Ban Dong Chan	บ้านดงจันทร์	357
Moo11	Ban Nong Ta See	บ้านหนองตาสี	482
Moo12	Ban Taku Samnang	บ้านตะกูสามนาง	505
Moo13	Ban Dong Phluang	บ้านดงพลวง	646
Moo14	Ban Wang Chamcha	บ้านวังฉำฉา	279
Moo15	Ban Lang San	บ้านหลังศาล	718

=== Local government ===
Wang Phikun is a subdistrict administrative organization - SAO (Thai: องค์การบริหารส่วนตำบลวังพิกุล, romanized: ongkan borihan suan tambon Wang Phikun, abbreviated: อบต.วังพิกุล, o bo toh Wang Phikun), which covers the whole tambon Wang Phikun.

For FY2022, the revenues and expenditures of Wang Phikun SAO were as follows:

Revenue of Wang Phikun SAO per million baht
Total	Taxes, duties	Fees, fines	Property	Commerce	Varied	Subsidies	Others
58.0	31.0	0.1	0.1	0.0	0.1	26.7	0.0

Expenditure of Wang Phikun SAO per million baht
Total	Central fund	Personnel	Operations	Investments	Subsidies	Others
43.6	17.0	12.5	7.4	4.5	2.2	0.0

The profit corresponds to 14.4 million baht (US$ 0.4 million).

== Temples ==
Wang Phikun subdistrict is home to the following active temples, where Theravada Buddhism is practiced by local residents.

Temple name	Thai	Location
Wat Wang Pradu	วัดวังประดู่	Moo1
Wat Wang Phikun Wararam	วัดวังพิกุลวราราม	Moo2
Wat Dong Khoi	วัดดงข่อย	Moo3
Wat Khlong Pet Henue	วัดคลองเป็ดเหนือ	Moo4
Wat Khlong Pet Tai	วัดคลองเป็ดใต้	Moo4
Wat Thanglat Pracharam	วัดทางลัดประชาราม	Moo5
Wat Khlong Mueang	วัดคลองเมือง	Moo6
Wat Dong Phluang	วัดดงพลวง	Moo7
Wat Wang Waree Si Sattharam	วัดวังวารีศรีศรัทธาราม	Moo7
Wat Wang Samrong	วัดวังสำโรง	Moo8
Wat Dong Chan	วัดดงชันทร์	Moo10
Wat Duang Rattana Prathip	วัดดวงรัตนประทีป	Moo11

== Economy ==
Most of the population worked in agriculture (rice and vegetable farming) and animal husbandry (raising chickens, ducks, cattle, pigs and buffaloes).

== Healthcare ==
There are two health-promoting hospitals in Wang Phikun subdistrict, (Moo4 and Moo7).

== Transportation ==
The subdistrict is connected to highways 11 northbound (Chiang Mai route), 12 westbound (Tak route), 12 eastbound (Khon Kaen route) and 126 (Phitsanulok bypass).
