= Ban Pa =

Coordinates: 16.9244°N 100.3503°E

Ban Pa บ้านป่า
- Tambon
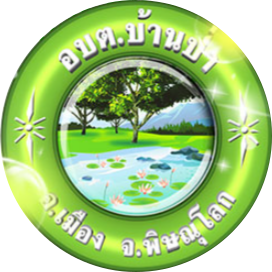
- Seal
- Interactive map of Ban Pa
- Country: Thailand
- Province: Phitsanulok
- District: Mueang Phitsanulok

Government
  - Type: Subdistrict Administration Organization (SAO)

Area
  - Total: 60 km^{2} (23 sq mi)

Population (2025)
  - Total: 5,779
  - Density: 96/km^{2} (250/sq mi)
- Time zone: UTC+7 (ICT)
- Postal code: 65000
- Calling code: 055
- ISO 3166 code: TH-65010900
- LAO code: 06650115
- Website: www.banpa.go.th

Ban Pa (Thai: บ้านป่า) is a subdistrict in Mueang Phitsanulok District of Phitsanulok Province, Thailand. In 2025 it had a population of 5,779 and 2,684 households. The economy of this subdistrict is mainly based on agriculture and fishery.

== Geography ==
The topography of Ban Pa is a plain area at the foot of the mountain. The subdistrict is bordered to the north by Wat Bot district, to the east and south by Don Thong subdistrict, to the west by Hua Ro subdistrict and Makham Sung subdistrict. Ban Pa subdistrict lies in the Nan Basin, which is part of the Chao Phraya Watershed. The Nan River flows west of the subdistrict.

== History ==
The local legend is that it was originally a dense rainforest. In 1821, people from Vientiane province (Laos) arrived in Moo3 and Moo5. In 1832, Thai people settled Ban Laem Rang in Moo1. Later, people from Phichit and Phrae provinces arrived. Original Moo6 was called Ban Tai, Moo7 was called Ban Nuea and Moo7 was called Ban Rai. Today, these three villages are all called Ban Pa. Ultimately, most forest on plains is cleared for agriculture.

== Administration ==
=== Provincial government ===
The administration of Ban Pa subdistrict is responsible for an area that covers 37,625 rai ~ 60 square kilometres (23 sq mi) and consists of 10 administrative villages, as of 2025: 5,779 people and 2,684 households.

Ban Pa subdistrict with villages

| Village | English | Thai | People | Households |
|---|---|---|---|---|
| Moo1 | Ban Nong Chok | บ้านหนองจอก | 127 | 75 |
| Moo2 | Ban Bueng Sai | บ้านบึงไทร | 639 | 290 |
| Moo3 | Ban Bueng Kradan | บ้านบึงกระดาน | 719 | 367 |
| Moo4 | Ban Laem Pradu | บ้านแหลมประดู่ | 258 | 108 |
| Moo5 | Ban Sae | บ้านแซ่ | 496 | 221 |
| Moo6 | Ban Pa | บ้านป่า | 652 | 325 |
| Moo7 | Ban Pa | บ้านป่า | 430 | 212 |
| Moo8 | Ban Pa | บ้านป่า | 1,154 | 517 |
| Moo9 | Ban Dong | บ้านดง | 811 | 372 |
| Moo10 | Ban Wang Yao | บ้านวังยาว | 493 | 197 |

=== Local government ===
Ban Pa Subdistrict Administrative Organization - Ban Pa SAO (Thai: องค์การบริหารตำบลบ้านป่า, romanized: ongkan borihan suan tambon Ban Pa) covers the whole Ban Pa subdistrict.

== Temples ==
Ban Pa subdistrict is home to the following active temples, where Theravada Buddhism is practiced by local residents:

| Temple name | Thai | Location |
|---|---|---|
| Wat Saeng Muk Anothai | วัดแสงมุขอโณทัย | Moo1 |
| Wat Bueng Kradan | วัดบึงกระดาน | Moo3 |
| Wat Wang Yao Samakeetham | วัดวังยาวสามัคคีธรรม | Moo3 |
| Wat Ban Sae | วัดบ้านแซ่ | Moo5 |
| Wat Ban Pa | วัดบ้านป่า | Moo6 |
| Wat Khao Rai Iam Sophon | วัดเขาไร่เอี่ยมโสภณ | Moo9 |

== Infrastructure ==
=== Education ===
The following elementary/secondary schools are located in Ban Pa:

- Ban Bueng Kradan School (Methaprachanukul) - Moo3
- Ban Pa (Bill Asa Prachasan) School - Moo6
- Ban Dong Wittaya school - Moo9

=== Healthcare ===
There is Ban Pa health-promoting hospital in Moo7.

=== Transportation ===
Major road is:

- Highway 11, Phitsanulok - Den Chai route.

=== Electricity ===
All households in Ban Pa subdistrict have access to the electricity grid of Provincial Electricity Authority (PEA).

=== Communications ===
There are more than twenty mobile top-up kiosks and two public phone booths and also one Thai Post office.

=== Waterworks ===
All households in Ban Pa subdistrict have access to the water network of Provincial Waterworks Authority (PWA).

== Economy ==
The economy of Ban Pa is mainly based on crop (rice and corn) and livestock (chickens, cattle and pigs) production and fisheries.
The following companies play a role in the employment service:

- Cargill Siam Co. Ltd. - Moo8
- T.P.Pacific Co. Ltd. - Moo8
- Thai Charoen fresh fruit market - Moo6
- Rice mill - Moo3
- Three petrol and gas stations - Moo4, Moo6 and Moo8

== Attraction ==
- Bueng Thung Hong (Thai:บึงทุ่งหงษ์) - Moo1
