= Phan Chali =

Coordinates: 16.63°N 100.48°E

Phan Chali พันชาลี
- Subdistrict
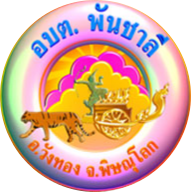
- Seal
- Interactive map of Phan Chali
- Country: Thailand
- Province: Phitsanulok
- District: Wang Thong

Government
  - Type: Subdistrict administrative organization (SAO)

Area
  - Total: 127 km^{2} (49 sq mi)

Population (2025)
  - Total: 9,347
  - Density: 73/km^{2} (190/sq mi)
- Time zone: UTC+7 (ICT)
- Postal code: 65130
- Calling code: 055
- ISO 3166 code: TH-650802
- LAO code: 06650803
- Website: www.phanchalee.go.th

Phan Chali (Thai: พันชาลี) is a sub-district in the Wang Thong District of Phitsanulok Province. It is connected to Highway 11. In 2025 it had a population of 9,347.

== Geography ==
The subdistrict is located in the lower northern part of Thailand and is bordered to the north by Tha Muen Ram subdistrict, Wang Thong district, to the east by Chomphu subdistrict, Noen Maprang district, to the south by Sak Lek district, Phichit province and Wat Ta Yom subdistrict, Bang Krathum district, to the west by Nong Phra subdistrict, Wang Thong district.
A forested area 7,100 rai ~ 11.4 square kilometres (4.4 sq mi) is located in the northeast of the subdistrict (Moo8, Moo13, Moo14 and Moo17). Khao Phanom Thong is a 468 metres (1,535 ft) high mountain located in Moo13, Moo14 and also in Tha Muen Ram subdistrict and in Chomphu subdistrict, Noen Maprang district. On 5 January 2017 an total area of 14,125 rai ~ 23 square kilometres (8.9 sq mi) was designed to be Khao Phanom Thong non-hunting area. Phan Chali lies in the Nan Basin, which is part of the Chao Phraya Watershed. Highway 11 runs along the subdistrict.

== History ==
On 2 March 1995 Ministry of Interior announced the establishment of Phan Chali subdistrict administrative organization - SAO (ongkan borihan suan tambon).

== Administration ==
=== Provincial government ===
The administration of Phan Chali subdistrict is responsible for an area that covers 79,406 rai ~ 127 square kilometres (49 sq mi) and consists of seventeen administrative villages, as of 2025 9,347 people and 3,663 families.

Phan Chali subdistrict with villages

Village	English	Thai	People
Moo1	Ban Rai Phan Chali	บ้านไร่พันชาลี	659
Moo2	Ban Phan Chali	บ้านพันชาลี	634
Moo3	Ban Khlong Luek	บ้านคลองลึก	194
Moo4	Ban Noen Mai Daeng	บ้านเนินไม้แดง	732
Moo5	Ban Nong Ka Dam	บ้านหนองกาดำ	691
Moo6	Ban Nong Nga	บ้านหนองงา	737
Moo7	Ban Nong Kanya	บ้านหนองกัญญา	715
Moo8	Ban Suphan Phanom Thong	บ้านสุพรรณพนมทอง	533
Moo9	Ban Khlong Du	บ้านคลองดู่	611
Moo10	Ban Wang Mai Tok	บ้านวังไม้ตอก	406
Moo11	Ban Nong Hin	บ้านหนองหิน	584
Moo12	Ban Noen Pradu	บ้านเนินประดู่	480
Moo13	Ban Noen Prasert	บ้านเนินประเสริฐ	418
Moo14	Ban Nong Kham	บ้านหนองขาม	522
Moo15	Ban Noen Chan	บ้านเนินจันทร์	504
Moo16	Ban Khlong Wang Ruea	บ้านคลองวังเรือ	264
Moo17	Ban Suphan Phanom Thong	บ้านสุพรรณพนมทอง	663

=== Local government ===
Phan Chali is a subdistrict administrative organization - SAO (Thai: องค์การบริหารส่วนตำบลพันชาลี, romanized: ongkan borihan suan tambon Phan Chali, abbreviated: อบต.พันชาลี, o bo toh Phan Chali), which covers the whole tambon Phan Chali.

For FY2022, the revenues and expenditures of Phan Chali SAO were as follows:

Revenue of Phan Chali SAO per million baht
Total	Taxes, duties	Fees, fines	Property	Commerce	Varied	Subsidies	Others
68.7	28.2	0.1	0.1	0.0	0.1	35.2	5.0

Expenditure of Phan Chali SAO per million baht
Total	Central fund	Personnel	Operations	Investments	Subsidies	Others
46.8	17.4	12.5	6.3	7.2	3.4	0.0

The profit corresponds to 21.9 million baht (US$ 0.7 million).

== Temples ==
Phan Chali subdistrict is home to twelve active temples, where Theravada Buddhism is practiced by local residents, of which eleven Maha Nikai and one Dhammayut temples.

Temple name	Thai	Location
Wat Wang Krachon	วัดวังกระชอน	Moo1
Wat Phan Chali	วัดพันชาลี	Moo2
Wat Nong Thong	วัดหนองทอง	Moo6
Wat Nong Kanya	วัดหนองกัญญา	Moo7
Wat Suphan Phanom Thong	วัดสุพรรณพนมทอง	Moo8
Wat Khao Phanom Thong	วัดเขาพนมทอง	Moo9
Wat Khlong Du	วัดคลองดู่	Moo9
Wat Suwan Damrongtham	วัดสุวรรณดำรงธรรม	Moo9
Wat Wang Mai Tok	วัดวังไม้ตอก	Moo10
Wat Nong Kadam Bamrungtham	วัดหนองกาดำบำรุงธรรม	Moo11
Wat Noen Mai Daeng	วัดเนินไม้แดง	Moo12
Wat Pa Nam Chon	วัดป่าน้ำโจน	Moo13

== Education ==
The following elementary/secondary schools are located in Phan Chali subdistrict.

- Ban Nong Nga school - Moo6
- Ban Noen Thong school - Moo7
- Ban Khlong Du school - Moo9
- Ban Wang Mai Tok school - Moo10
- Ban Noen Mai Daeng school - Moo12
- Wat Suphan Phanom Thong school - Moo17

== Healthcare ==
There are two health-promoting hospitals in Phan Chali subdistrict.

- Phan Chali h.p.h. - Moo2
- Ban Suphan Phanom Thong h.p.h. - Moo8
