= Tha Muen Ram =

Tha Muen Ram ท่าหมื่นราม (English: Dock of 10,000 Temples)
- Subdistrict
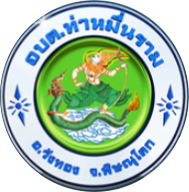
- Seal
- Interactive map of Tha Muen Ram
- Coordinates: 16°40′00″N 100°30′00″E
- Country: Thailand
- Province: Phitsanulok
- District: Wang Thong

Government
  - Type: Subdistrict administrative organization (SAO)

Area
  - Total: 111 km^{2} (43 sq mi)

Population (2025)
  - Total: 7,773
  - Density: 70/km^{2} (180/sq mi)
- Time zone: UTC+7 (ICT)
- Postal code: 65130
- Calling code: 055
- ISO 3166 code: TH-650807
- LAO code: 06650808
- Website: www.thameunram.go.th

Tha Muen Ram (Thai: ท่าหมื่นราม) is a sub-district in the Wang Thong district of Phitsanulok province, Thailand. It is connected to Highway 12. In 2025 it had a population of 7,773. The economy is mainly based on agriculture and animal husbandry.

== Geography ==
The subdistrict is located in the lower northern part of Thailand and is bordered to the north by Wang Nok Aen subdistrict, Wang Thong district, to the east by Chomphu subdistrict, Noen Maprang district, to the south by Phan Chali subdistrict, Wang Thong district, to the west by Nong Phra and Din Thong subdistricts, Wang Thong district.
Tha Muen Ram lies in the Nan Basin, which is part of the Chao Phraya Watershed. Highway 11 runs along the subdistrict.

== History ==
On 30 January 1996 Ministry of Interior announced the establishment of Tha Muen Ram subdistrict administrative organization - SAO (ongkan borihan suan tambon), effective on 30 March 1996.

== Administration ==
=== Provincial government ===
The administration of Tha Muen Ram subdistrict is responsible for an area that covers 127,768 rai ~ 204.4 square kilometres (78.9 sq mi) and consists of thirteen administrative villages, as of 2025: 10,445 people and 4,947 families.

Village	English	Thai	People
Moo1	Ban Tha Muen Ram	บ้านท่าหมื่นราม	613
Moo2	Ban Nern Sa'at	บ้านเนินสะอาด	645
Moo3	Ban Nong Thao It	บ้านหนองเตาอิฐ	836
Moo4	Ban Dong Than	บ้านดงตาล	202
Moo5	Ban Nong Choom Saeng	บ้านหนองชุมแสง	138
Moo6	Ban Nern Magluea	บ้านเนินมะเกลือ	739
Moo7	Ban Dong Noi	บ้านดงน้อย	449
Moo8	Ban Thung Noi	บ้านทุ่งน้อย	413
Moo9	Ban Thung Nong Daeng	บ้านทุ่งหนองแดง	489
Moo10	Ban Sai Ngam	บ้านไทรงาม	702
Moo11	Ban Pa Khai	บ้านป่าคาย	637
Moo12	Ban Nong Ya Khong Bang	บ้านหนองหญ้าคงบาง	449
Moo13	Ban Nong Pla Lai	บ้านหนองปลาไหล	721
Moo14	Ban Pong Khae	บ้านโป่งแค	740

=== Local government ===
Tha Muen Ram is a subdistrict administrative organization - SAO (Thai: องค์การบริหารส่วนตำบลแก่งโสภา, romanized: ongkan borihan suan tambon Tha Muen Ram, abbreviated: อบต.แก่งโสภา, o bo toh Tha Muen), which covers the whole tambon Tha Muen Ram.

For FY2022, the revenues and expenditures of Tha Muen Ram SAO were as follows:

Revenue of Tha Muen Ram SAO per million baht
Total	Taxes, duties	Fees, fines	Property	Commerce	Varied	Subsidies	Others
51.6	26.1	0.1	0.1	0.0	0.1	25.2	0.0

Expenditure of Tha Muen Ram SAO per million baht
Total	Central fund	Personnel	Operations	Investments	Subsidies	Others
42.2	15.2	9.8	6.7	8.0	2.5	0.0

The profit corresponds to 9.4 million baht (US$ 0.3 million).

== Temples ==
Tha Muen Ram subdistrict is home to the following active temples, where Theravada Buddhism is practiced by local residents.

Temple name	Thai	Location
Wat Tha Muen Ram	วัดท่าหมื่นราม	Moo1
Wat Ban Noen Sa-at	วัดบ้านเนินสะอาด	Moo2
Wat Nong Tao It	วัดหนองเตาอิฐ	Moo3
Wat Ya San	วัดหญ้าช่าน	Moo3
Wat Seng Sawang	วัดแสงสว่าง	Moo5
Wat Noen Mak Luea Wanaram	วัดเนินมะเกลือวนาราม	Moo6
Wat Thung Noi	วัดทุ่งน้อย	Moo8
Wat Thung Noi Khiri Banphot	วัดทุ่งน้อยคิรีบรรพต	Moo8
Wat Sai Ngam Charoen Tham	วัดไทรงามเจริญธรรม	Moo10
Wat Pa Khai Wanaram	วัดป่าคายวนาราม	Moo11
Wat Veluwan	วัดเวฬุวัน	Moo11

== Education ==
There are three primary schools (Moo2, Moo8 and Moo13) and one secondary school (Moo2).

== Healthcare ==
There are two health-promoting hospitals in Tha Muen Ram subdistrict, (Moo1 and Moo3).
