= Makham Sung =

Coordinates: 16.928°N 100.235°E

Makham Sung มะขามสูง
- Tambon
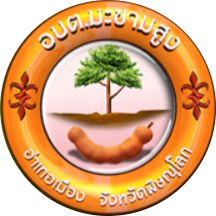
- Seal
- Interactive map of Makham Sung
- Country: Thailand
- Province: Phitsanulok
- District: Mueang Phitsanulok

Government
  - Type: Subdistrict Administrative; Organization (SAO)

Area
  - Total: 31.3 km^{2} (12.1 sq mi)

Population (2025)
  - Total: 5,702
  - Density: 182/km^{2} (470/sq mi)
- Time zone: UTC+7 (ICT)
- Postal code: 65000
- Calling code: 055
- ISO 3166 code: TH-65011600
- LAO code: 06650118
- Website: www.makhamsoong.go.th

Makham Sung (Thai: มะขามสูง) is a subdistrict in the Mueang Phitsanulok District of Phitsanulok Province, Thailand. In 2025 it had a population of 5,702 and 2,677 households. The economy of this subdistrict is mainly based on agriculture.

== Geography ==
The topography of Makham Sung subdistrict is flat plains and is located in the lower northern part of Thailand. The subdistrict is bordered to the north by Phrom Phiram district, to the east by Ban Pa subdistrict, to the south by Pak Thok and Hua Ro subdistricts and to the west by Phrom Phiram district. Makham Sung subdistrict lies in the Nan Basin, which is part of the Chao Phraya Watershed. The Khwae Noi River flows on the boundary of Makham Sung subdistrict and Phrom Phiram district.

== History ==
On 19 January 1996 Ministry of Interior announced the establishment of Makham Sung Subdistrict Administrative Organization - SAO (ongkan borihan suan tambon).

== Administration ==
=== Provincial government ===
The administration of ฺMakham Sung subdistrict (tambon) is responsible for an area that covers 19,570 rai ~ 31.3 square kilometres (12.1 sq mi) and consists of ten administrative villages (muban). As of 2025: 5,702 people and 2,677 households.

Makham Sung subdistrict with villages

| Village | English | Thai | People | Households |
|---|---|---|---|---|
| Moo1 | Ban Thong Lang | บ้านทองหลาง | 572 | 272 |
| Moo2 | Ban Thong Lang | บ้านทองหลาง | 451 | 210 |
| Moo3 | Ban Wang Rae | บ้านวังแร่ | 606 | 285 |
| Moo4 | Ban Makham Sung | บ้านมะขามสูง | 522 | 365 |
| Moo5 | Ban Makham Sung | บ้านมะขามสูง | 463 | 211 |
| Moo6 | Ban Tha Phrao | บ้านท่าพร้าว | 515 | 224 |
| Moo7 | Ban Hua Wang Krang | บ้านหัววังกร่าง | 725 | 314 |
| Moo8 | Ban Laem San | บ้านแหลมซ่าน | 795 | 352 |
| Moo9 | Ban Lamu | บ้านละมุ | 598 | 199 |
| Moo10 | Ban Khwae Noi | บ้านแควน้อย | 455 | 245 |

=== Local government ===
Makham Sung Subdistrict Administrative Organization - Makham Sung SAO (Thai: องค์การบริหารตำบลมะขามสูง, romanized: ongkan borihan suan tambon Makham Sung) covers the whole Makham Sung subdistrict.

== Temples ==
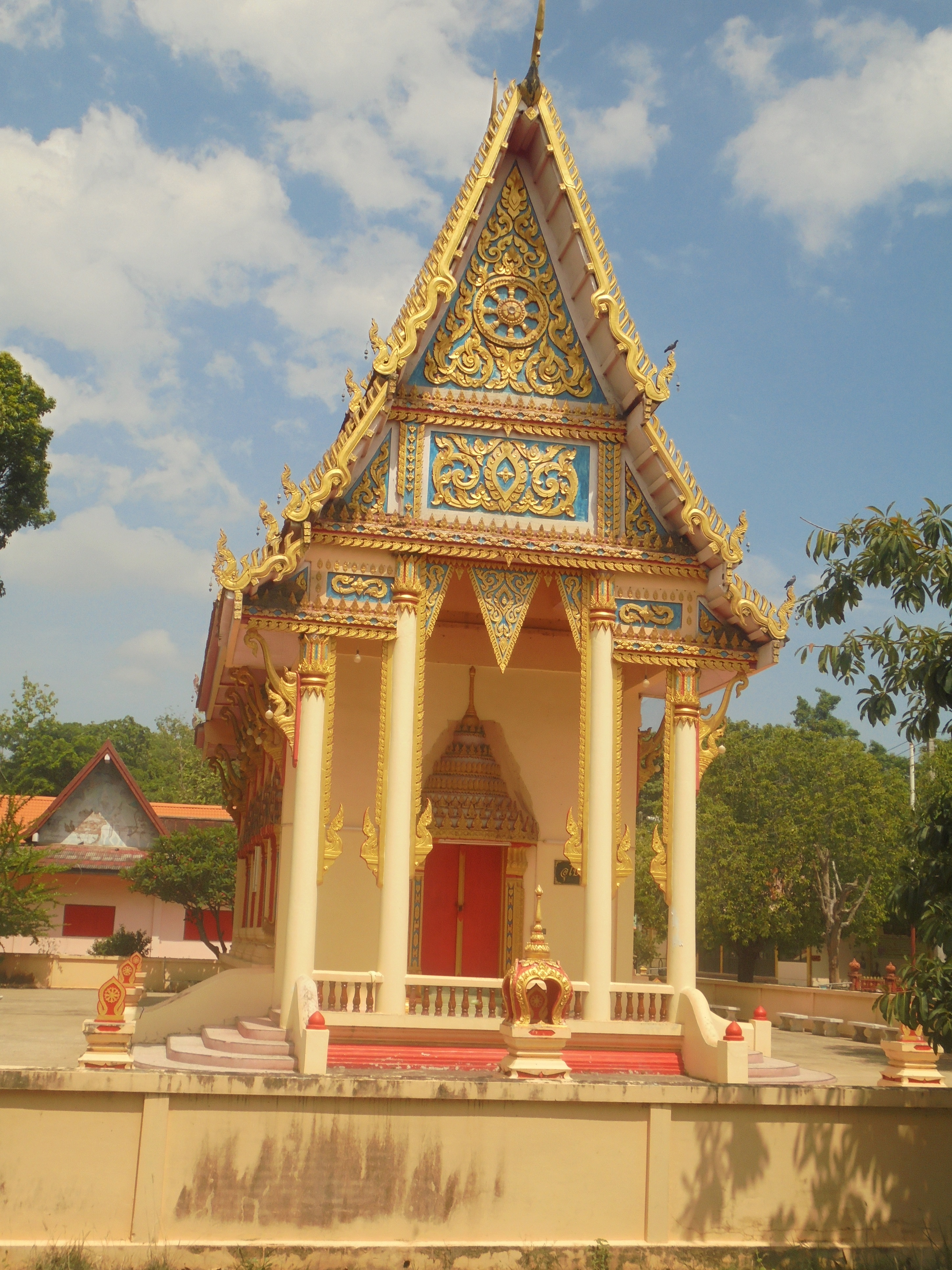
Wat Thong Lang

Makham Sung subdistrict is home to the following active temples, where Theravada Buddhism is practised by local residents:

| Temple name | Thai | Location |
|---|---|---|
| Wat Thong Lang | วัดทองหลาง | Moo2 |
| Wat Tako | วัดตะโก | Moo4 |
| Wat Hua Wang Krang Wanaram | วัดหัววังกา่างวนาราม | Moo7 |

== Economy ==
Most of the people are engaged in agriculture of which rice is the main crop.

== Education ==
The following schools are located in Makham Sung subdistrict.

- Phitsanulok Panyanukun school - Moo3
- Princess Chulabhorn Science High Schools Phitsanulok - Moo4
- Thairat Wittaya 9 school - Moo4
- Ban Hua Wang Krang school - Moo7
- Ban Laem Sam school - Moo8

== Healthcare ==
- Makham Sung health-promoting hospital in Moo1.
- Health Center 2 Phitsanulok - Moo4

== Transport ==
- National road 1086, Phitsanulok-Wat Bot
- National road 1275, Makham Sung-Phrom Phiram

== Electricity ==
All households in Makham Sung subdistrict have access to the electricity grid of Provincial Electricity Authority (PEA).

== Waterworks ==
All households in Makham Sung subdistrict have access to the water network of Provincial Waterworks Authority (PWA).

== Communications ==
All households in Makham Sung subdistrict have access to the mobile telephone network.
