= Hua Ro =

Coordinates: 16.8477°N 100.2563°E

Hua Ro หัวรอ
- Tambon
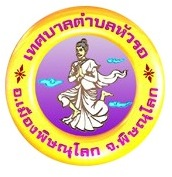
- Seal
- Country: Thailand
- Province: Phitsanulok
- District: Mueang Phitsanulok

Government
  - Type: Subdistrict-municipality

Area
  - Total: 88.8 km^{2} (34.3 sq mi)

Population (2025)
  - Total: 26,537
  - Density: 298/km^{2} (770/sq mi)
- Time zone: UTC+7 (ICT)
- Postal code: 65000
- Calling code: 055
- ISO 3166 code: TH-65011100
- LAO code: 05650103
- Website: www.houraw.go.th

Hua Ro (Thai: หัวรอ) is a subdistrict in the Mueang Phitsanulok District of Phitsanulok Province, Thailand. In 2025 it had a population of 26,537 and 14,381 households. This subdistrict contains a concentration of regional and provincial government institutions.

== Geography ==
The topography of Hua Ro is fertile lowlands. The subdistrict is bordered to the northwest by Pak Thok subdistrict, to the north by Makham Sung subdistrict and Ban Pa subdistrict, to the east by Don Thong subdistrict and Samo Khae subdistrict, to the south by Aranyik subdistrict and the City of Phitsanulok, and to the west by Phlai Chumphon subdistrict and Ban Khlong subdistrict. Hua Ro subdistrict lies in the Nan Basin, which is part of the Chao Phraya Watershed. The Nan River flows west of the subdistrict. Northern part of Hua Ro subdistrict is the area of agriculture and housing, southern part of Hua Ro subdistrict is a residential area for people and a cluster of government institutions and schools.

== History ==
Originally, the area was combined with Phlai Chumphon subdistrict, called Wat Tan subdistrict. It was separated into two subdistricts, with the Nan river as a dividing line. The area on the westside was called Phlai Chumphon subdistrict and the area on the eastside was called Hua Ro subdistrict.
Hua Ro Subdistrict Administrative Organization - SAO (ongkan borihan suan tambon) was established. Subsequent upgrade to subdistrict-municipality (thesaban tambon), published 20 September 2011 in Royal Thai Government Gazette, but effective 30 September 2011.

== Administration ==
=== Provincial government ===
The administration of Hua Ro subdistrict is responsible for an area that covers 88.8 km^{2} and consists of 12 administrative villages, as of 2025: 26,537 people and 14,381 households.

Hua Ro subdistrict with villages

Village	Community name	Thai	People	Households
Moo1	Ban Bang Phayom	บ้านบางพยอม	518	200
Moo2	Ban Bang Phayom	บ้านบางพยอม	1,222	512
Moo3	Ban Ta Pa Khao Hai	บ้านตาปะขาวหาย	4,239	2,628
Moo4	Ban Ta Pa Khao Hai	บ้านตาปะขาวหาย	559	584
Moo5	Ban Khlong	บ้านคลอง	2,677	1,626
Moo6	Ban Teng Nam	บ้านเต็งหนาม	3,355	1,888
Moo7	Ban Sa Khlo	บ้านสระโคล่	1,563	948
Moo8	Ban Teng Nam	บ้านเต็งหนาม	3,476	1,685
Moo9	Ban Teng Samnak	บ้านเต็งสำนัก	1,059	471
Moo10	Ban Sa Khlo	บ้านสระโคล่	1,959	883
Moo11	Ban Teng Nam	บ้านเต็งหนาม	3,367	1,734
Moo12	Ban Klang Khlong	บ้านคลางคลอง	2,543	1,222

Administrative villages contain many villages such as:

- Moo3 - Mae Thorani Thong, Athor and Lovely Home
- Moo5 - Thip Phiman
- Moo6 - Fa Sai, Sophon, Ratchathani Housing, Rom Chat 2 and Sawan Pin Kaew
- Moo7 - Sawan Fah Ing Dao and Parisorn
- Moo8 - Dwongchai and Nuchada Park
- Moo11- Choti Park

=== Local government ===
Hua Ro Subdistrict Municipality (Thai: เทศบาลตำบลหัวรอ, romanized: thetsaban tambon Hua Ro) covers the whole Hua Ro subdistrict.

== Temples ==
Hua Ro subdistrict is home to the following active temples, where Theravada Buddhism is practiced by local residents:

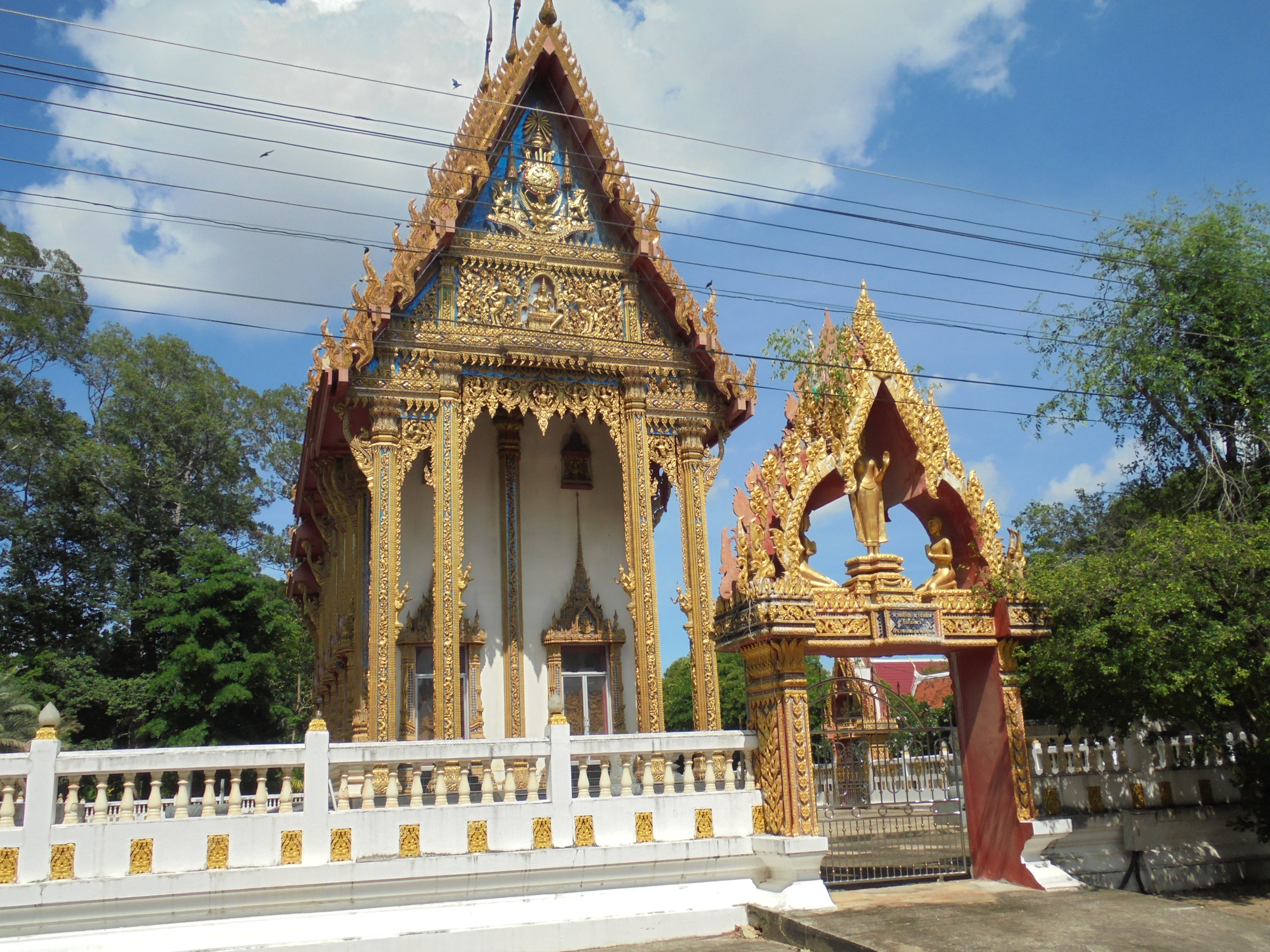
Wat Bang Phayom

Temple name	Thai	Location
Wat Bang Phayom	วัดบางพยอม	Moo2
Wat Ta Pa Khao Hai	วัดตาปะขาวหาย	Moo4
Wat Photiyan	วัดโพธิญาณ	Moo4
Wat Tha Sut	วัดท่าทรุด	Moo7
Wat Makham Tia	วัดมะขามติ้ย	Moo8
Wat Sa Kao Hong	วัดสระเก้าห้อง	Moo9
Wat Sa Khlo Soparam	วัดสระโคล่โสภาราม	Moo10
Wat Bo Thong Kham	วัดบ่อทองคำ	Moo11

== Economy ==
Employment is as follows: agriculture 50%, civil servant/state enterprise 25%, private agency 10%, personal business 10% and general contractor 5%. In addition to the many government organizations in Ban Ta Pa Khao Hai (Moo4) and Ban Khlong (Moo5), in Ban Sa Khlo (Moo7) there is Thai Arrow Company a medium sized enterprise (33,000 m^{2}) with their own shuttle touring car busses to pick up the mostly female workers. There are three fresh markets: Hua Ro municipality fresh market, Wat Photiyan intersection fresh market and Thai Theng Nam village fresh market.

== Government institutions ==
The following regional, provincial and local government institutions are mainly situated in Ban Ta Pa Khao Hai (Moo4) and Ban Khlong (Moo5):

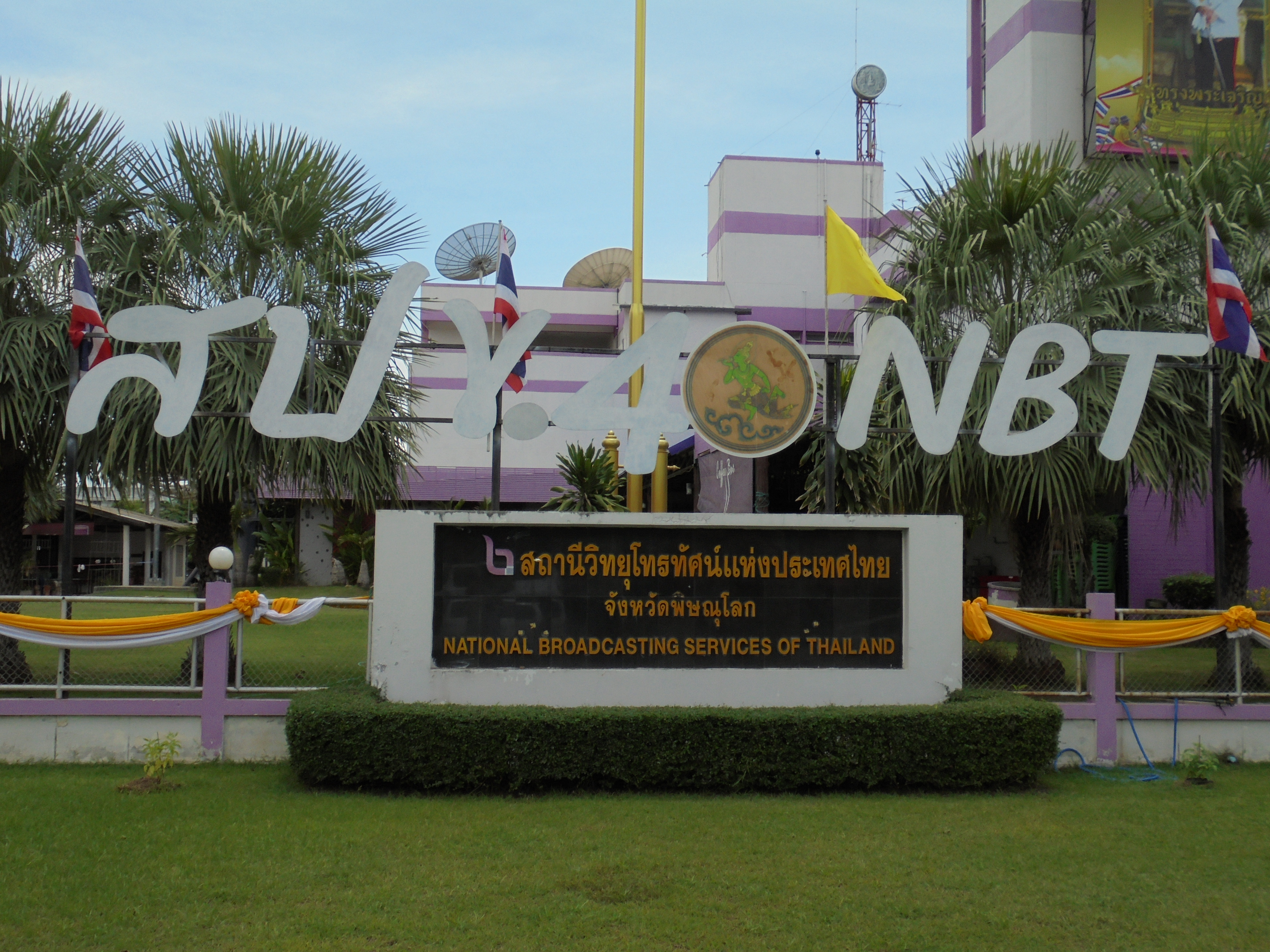
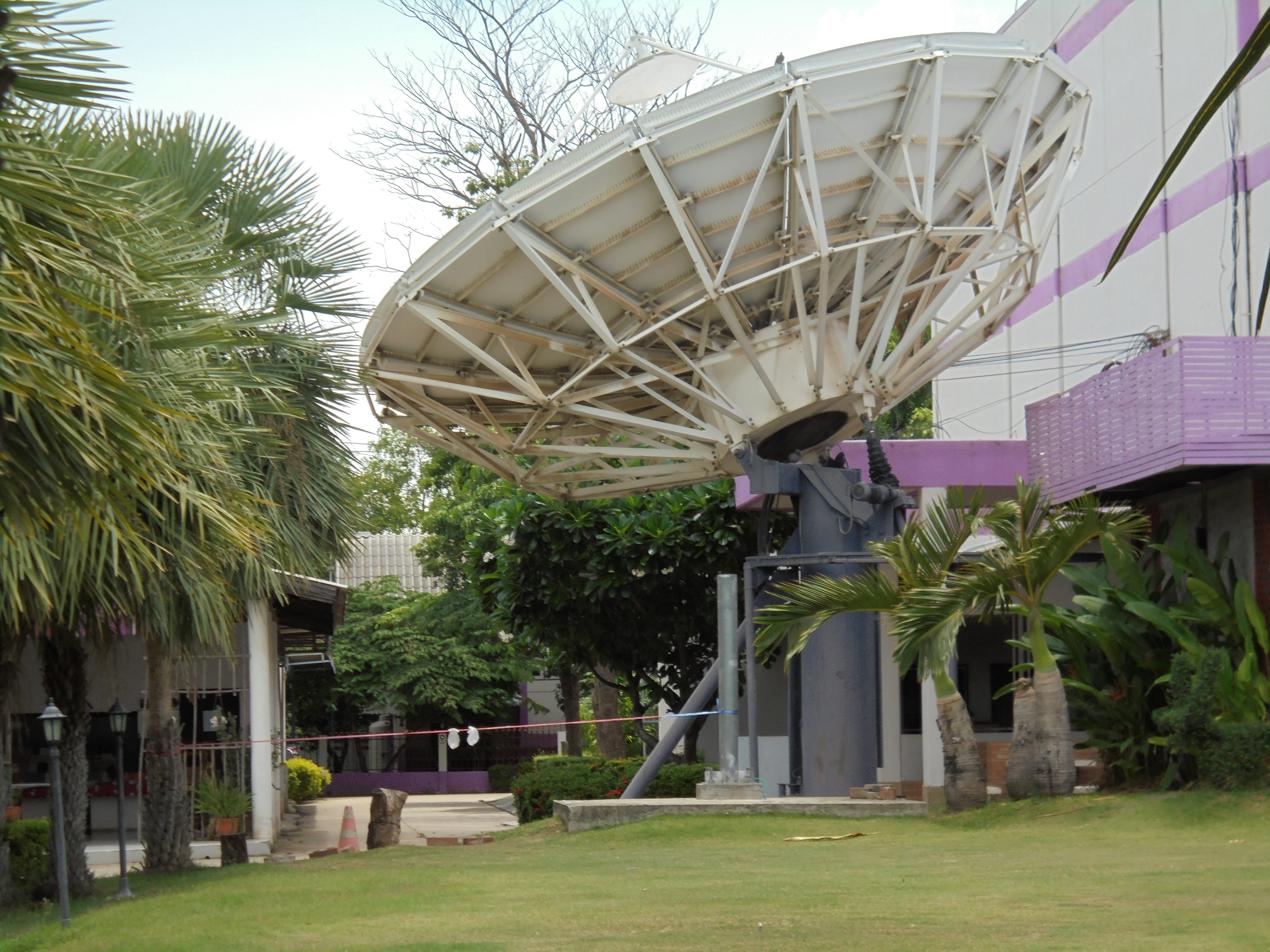
NBT Phitsanulok station with satellite dish
- Land Development Office 8
- Regional Office of Agricultural Economics 2
- Regional Office of Attorney General
- Regional Medical Sciences Center 2 (Phitsanulok)
- National Broadcasting Services of Thailand (NBTTV) This TV station in Hua Ro has been broadcasting to seven provinces since 1971.
- Phitsanulok Area Revenue Office 7
- Police Forensic Center 6, responsibility area of 10 provinces
- Phitsanulok Immigration Office
- Provincial Waterworks Authority Regional Office 10, responsible for the service in 10 provinces
- Public Relations Office Region 4 Phitsanulok, Office of the Prime Minister
- Department of Juvenile Observation and Protection
- Provincial Juvenile and Family Court
- Center for Control of Contagious Disease (CDC)
- Phitsanulok Provincial Audit Office
- Phitsanulok Provincial Fisheries Office
- Phitsanulok Provincial Legal Execution Office
- Tourist Police Station

== Waterworks ==
All households in Hua Ro subdistrict have access to the water network of Provincial Waterworks Authority (PWA).

== Healthcare ==
There are Hua Ro health-promoting hospital in Ban Ta Pa Khao Hai (Moo4) and
Ban Sa Khlo health-promoting hospital in Ban Sa Khlo (Moo10).

== Education ==
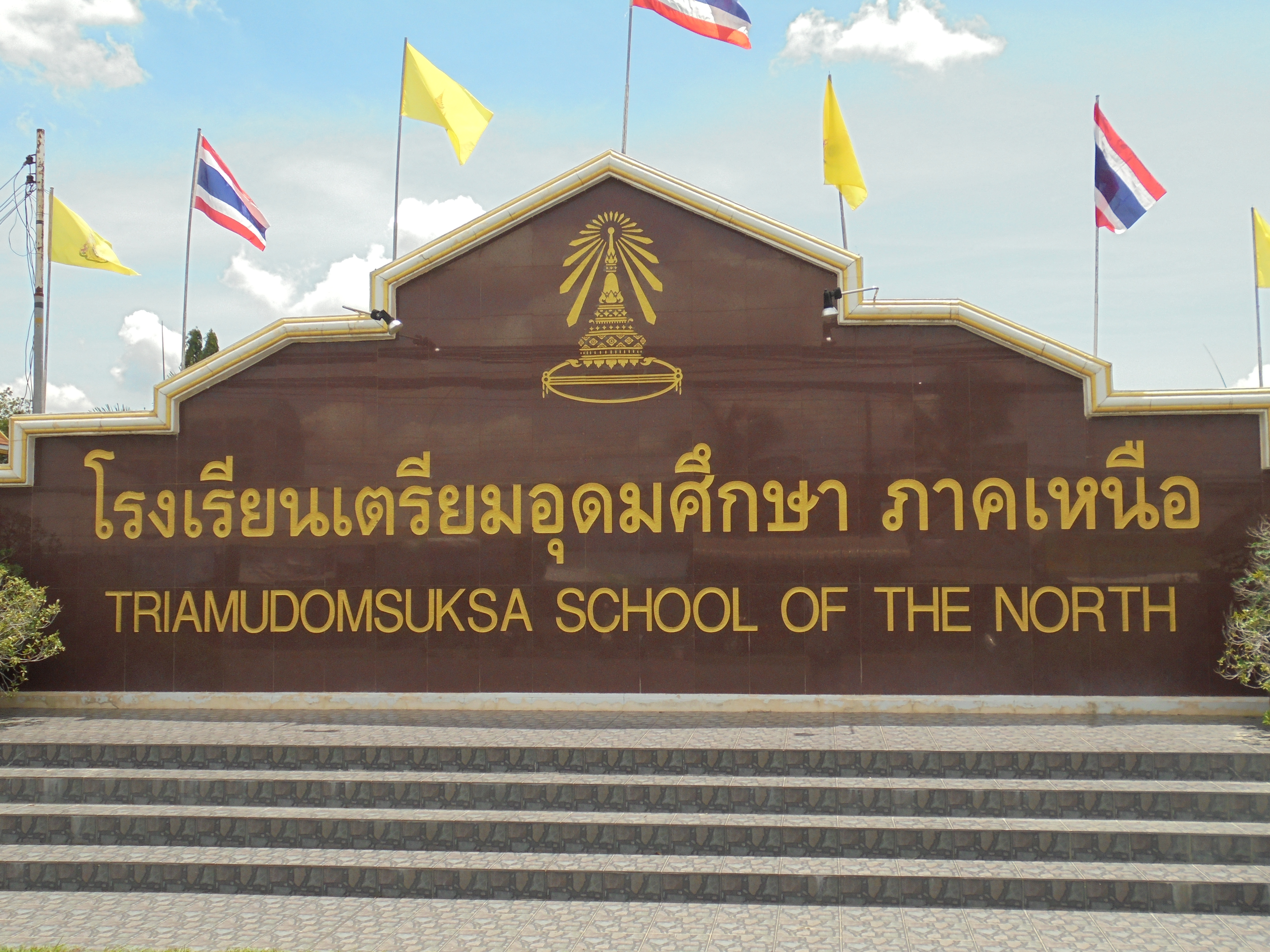
Triam Udom Suksa school

- Triam Udom Suksa school of the North, upper secondary school - mathayom 4-6
- Anuban primary school
- Wat Maha Wanaram primary school
- Wat Photiyan primary school
- Wat Sa Khlo primary school
- Wat Ta Pa Khao primary school

== Sports ==
Phitsanulok PAO. Stadium in Ban Khlong (Moo5) with 3,000 seats is the home stadium for footballclub Phitsanulok United.
