= Don Thong =

Coordinates: 16.904°N 100.3563°E

Don Thong ดอน ทอง
- Tambon
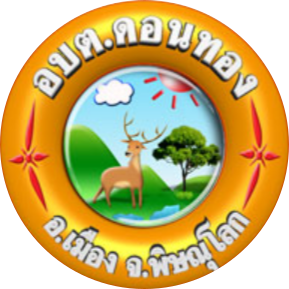
- Seal
- Interactive map of Don Thong
- Country: Thailand
- Province: Phitsanulok
- District: Mueang Phitsanulok

Government
  - Type: Subdistrict Administration Organization (SAO)

Area
  - Total: 75 km^{2} (29 sq mi)

Population (2022)
  - Total: 13,425
  - Density: 179/km^{2} (460/sq mi)
- Time zone: UTC+7 (ICT)
- Postal code: 65000
- Calling code: 055
- ISO 3166 code: TH-65010800
- LAO code: 06650106
- Website: www.donthongsao.go.th

Don Thong (Thai: ดอน ทอง) is a subdistrict in Mueang Phitsanulok District of Phitsanulok Province, Thailand. In 2025 it had a population of 13,425 and 6,329 households. The economy of this subdistrict is mainly based on agriculture.

== Geography ==
The topography of Don Thong is mainly plains, marshes and swamps. National forest covers 26,000 rai ~ 42 square kilometres (16 sq mi) of which eastern part is partly Khao Noi–Khao Pradu Non-hunting Area. The subdistrict is bordered to the north by Ban Pa subdistrict, to the east by Wang Thong district, to the south by Samo Khae subdistrict and to the west by Hua Ro subdistrict. Don Thong subdistrict lies in the Nan Basin, which is part of the Chao Phraya Watershed. The Nan River flows west of the subdistrict.

== History ==
On 19 January 1996 Ministry of Interior announced the establishment of Don Thong Subdistrict Administrative Organization - SAO (ongkan borihan suan tambon). On 30 January 1996 it was published in Government Gazette, volume 113, section 9 Ngor. This was effective from 1 March 1996.

== Administration ==
=== Provincial government ===
The administration of Don Thong subdistrict is responsible for an area that covers 46,875 rai ~ 75 square kilometres (29 sq mi) and consists of 14 administrative villages, as of 2025: 13,425 people and 6,329 households.

Don Thong subdistrict with villages

Village	English	Thai	People	Households
Moo1	Ban Don Thong 1	บ้านดอนทอง 1	1,034	585
Moo2	Ban Don Thong 2	บ้านดอนทอง 2	932	522
Moo3	Ban Bueng Tang	บ้านบึงถัง	751	386
Moo4	Ban Tan Suwan	บ้านตาลสุวรรณ	1,299	722
Moo5	Ban Pak Huai	บ้านปากกห้วย	1,282	630
Moo6	Ban Sa'ak	บ้านสะอัก	1,482	690
Moo7	Ban Teng Samnak	บ้านเต็งสำนัก	671	345
Moo8	Ban Nong Kwang Lee	บ้านหนองกวางลี้	1,145	507
Moo9	Ban Rong Yung Khao	บ้านร้องยุ้งข้าว	1,443	527
Moo10	Ban Nam Dam	บ้านน้ำดำ	1,155	409
Moo11	Ban Rong Wai Fad	บ้านร้องหวายผาด	329	168
Moo12	Ban Rai	บ้านไร่	875	459
Moo13	Ban Khao Fa	บ้านเขาฟ้า	467	168
Moo14	Ban Hin Lat	บ้านหินลาด	560	211

=== Local government ===
Don Thong Subdistrict Administrative Organization - Don Thong SAO (Thai: องค์การบริหารตำบลดอนทอง, romanized: ongkan borihan suan tambon Don Thong) covers the whole Don Thong subdistrict.

== Temples ==
Don Thong subdistrict is home to the following active temples, where Theravada Buddhism is practiced by local residents:

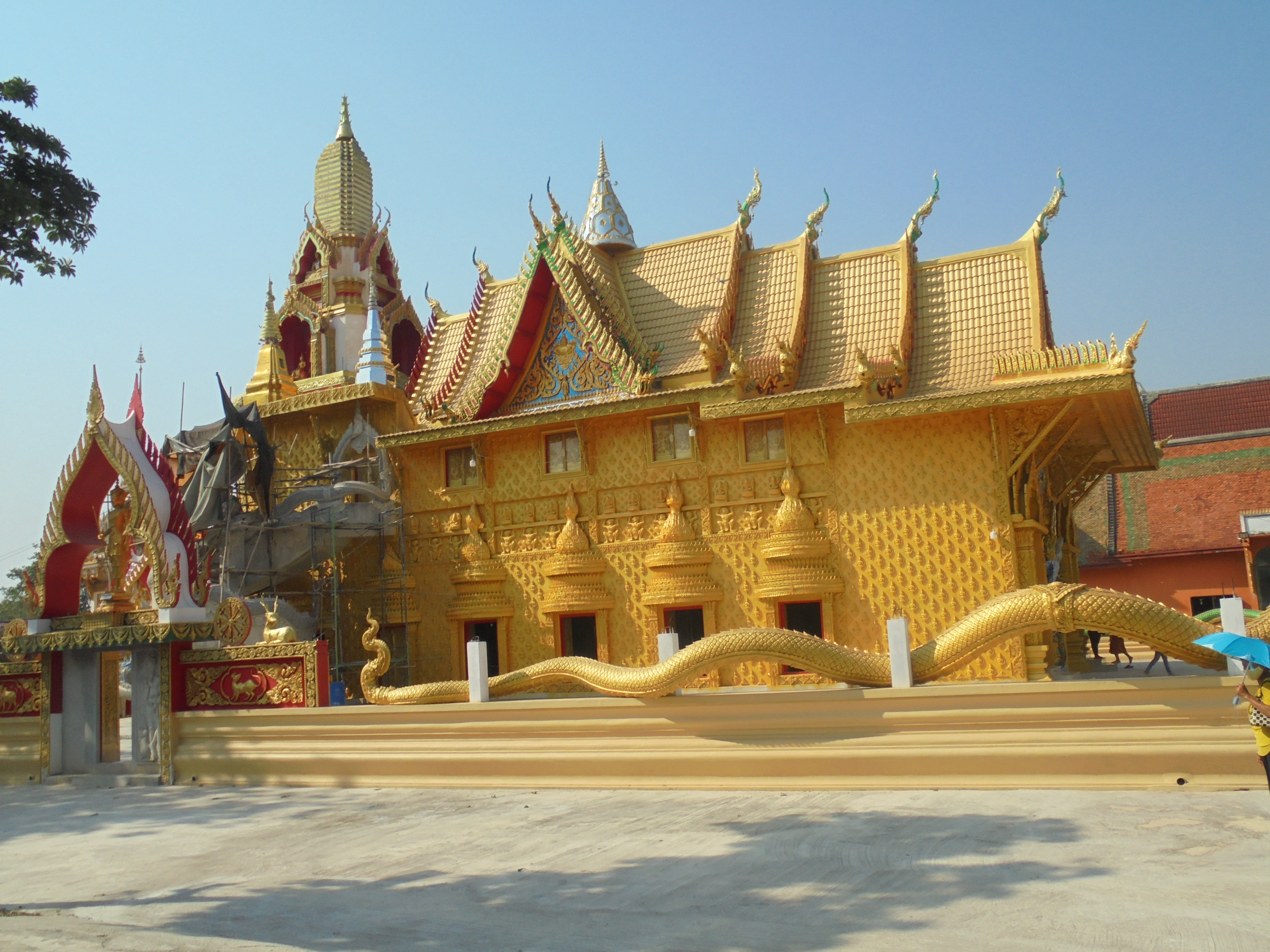
Wat Tan Suwan

Temple name	Thai	Location
Wat Nakhon Pa Mak	วัดนครป่าหมาก	Moo1
Wat Don Thong	วัดดอนทอง	Moo2
Wat Sak Bueng Thang Sattharam	วัดสักบึงถังศรัทธรรม	Moo3
Wat Tan Suwan	วัดตาลสุวรรณ	Moo4
Wat Pak Huai	วัดปากห้วย	Moo5
Wat Si Charoen Pho Thong	วัดศรีเจริญโพธิ์ทอง	Moo6
Wat Teng Samnak	วัดเต็งสำนัก	Moo7
Wat Nong Kwang Lee	วัดหนองกวางลี้	Moo8
Wat Ban Rong Yung Khao	วัดบ้านร้องยุ้งข้าว	Moo9
Wat Wat Nam Dam	วัดน้ำดำ	Moo10
Wat Bueng Ban Kao	วัดบึงบ้านข้าว	Moo12
Wat Khao Fa Pa Himaphan	วัดเขาฟ้าป่าหิมพานต์	Moo13
Wat Hin Lat	วัดหินลาด	Moo14

== Infrastructure ==
=== Education ===
The following elementary/secondary schools are located in Don Thong:

- Don Thong Wittaya school - Moo1
- Wat Don Thong school - Moo2
- Ban Teng Samnak school - Moo7
- Ban Nong Kwang Lee school - Moo8
- Ban Rong Yung Khao school - Moo9
- Ban Nam Dam school - Moo10
- Ban Rai school - Moo12
- Ban Hin Lat school - Moo14

=== Healthcare ===
There are Don Thong and Ban Rong Yung Khao health-promoting hospitals in Moo2 and Moo9.

=== Transportation ===
Major road is:

- Highway 11, Phitsanulok - Den Chai route.

=== Electricity ===
All households in Don Thong subdistrict have access to the electricity grid of Provincial Electricity Authority (PEA).

=== Communications ===
There are twenty public phone booths. All households have access to the fixed and mobile telephone networks.

- Thai Post office - Moo1
- Phitsanulok Postal Warehouse - Moo4

=== Waterworks ===
All households in Don Thong subdistrict have access to the water network of Provincial Waterworks Authority (PWA).

== Economy ==
Most of the population worked in crop (rice and corn) and livestock (chickens, cattle and pigs) production.

- agriculture - 52%
- general employee - 23%
- civil servants/state enterprises - 8%
- other - 17%

The following companies play a role in the employment service:

- Erawan C.P. Co., Ltd - Moo6
- Natara Business Co., Ltd - Moo2
- Non-toxic Brown Rice Group - Moo6
- Petrol and gas stations (6)
- Rice mills (9)
- Sum Ruan Kaeo Buddha Foundry - Moo4
- TAMCO Kasetpattana - Moo1
