= Pak Thok =

Coordinates: 16.88°N 100.22°E

Pak Thok ปากโทก
- Tambon
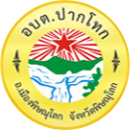
- Seal
- Interactive map of Pak Thok
- Country: Thailand
- Province: Phitsanulok
- District: Mueang Phitsanulok

Government
  - Type: Subdistrict Administrative Organization (SAO)

Area
  - Total: 21.3 km^{2} (8.2 sq mi)

Population (2025)
  - Total: 4,992
  - Density: 234/km^{2} (610/sq mi)
- Time zone: UTC+7 (ICT)
- Postal code: 65000
- Calling code: 055
- ISO 3166 code: TH-65011000
- LAO code: 06650117
- Website: www.paktok.go.th

Pak Thok (Thai: ปากโทก) is a subdistrict in the Mueang Phitsanulok District of Phitsanulok Province, Thailand. In 2025 it had a population of 4,992 and 2,443 households. The economy of this subdistrict is mainly based on agriculture.

== Geography ==
The topography of Pak Thok subdistrict is flat plains sloping from north to south and is located in the lower northern part of Thailand. The subdistrict is bordered to the north by Makham Sung subdistrict, to the east by Hua Ro subdistrict, to the south by Phlai Chumphon subdistrict and to the west by Chom Thong subdistrict. Pak Thok subdistrict lies in the Nan Basin, which is part of the Chao Phraya Watershed. The Khwae Noi River joins the Nan River in Moo3.

== History ==
In the past Pak Thok subdistrict covered parts of Phlai Chumphon and Chom Thong subdistricts. At present, the Nan River and Khwae Noi River form the boundary with Chom Thong subdistrict. Most of the residents are local people and some have migrated from Laos.

== Administration ==
=== Provincial government ===
The administration of ฺPak Thok subdistrict (tambon) is responsible for an area that covers 13,305 rai ~ 21.3 square kilometres (8.2 sq mi) and consists of seven administrative villages (muban). As of 2025: 4,992 people and 2,443 households.

Pak Thok subdistrict with villages

Village	English	Thai	People	Households
Moo1	Ban Phai Khom	บ้านไผ่ค่อม	650	295
Moo2	Ban Tum	บ้านตูม	829	377
Moo3	Ban Phai Khom	บ้านไผ่ค่อม	623	305
Moo4	Ban Saeng Dao	บ้านแสงดาว	744	330
Moo5	Ban Saeng Dao	บ้านแสงดาว	440	235
Moo6	Ban Saeng Dao	บ้านแสงดาว	767	466
Moo7	Ban Khung Mo	บ้านคุ้งหม้อ	939	435

=== Local government ===
Pak Thok Subdistrict Administrative Organization - Pak Thok SAO (Thai: องค์การบริหารตำบลปากโทก, romanized: ongkan borihan suan tambon Pak Thok) covers the whole Pak Thok subdistrict.

== Temples ==
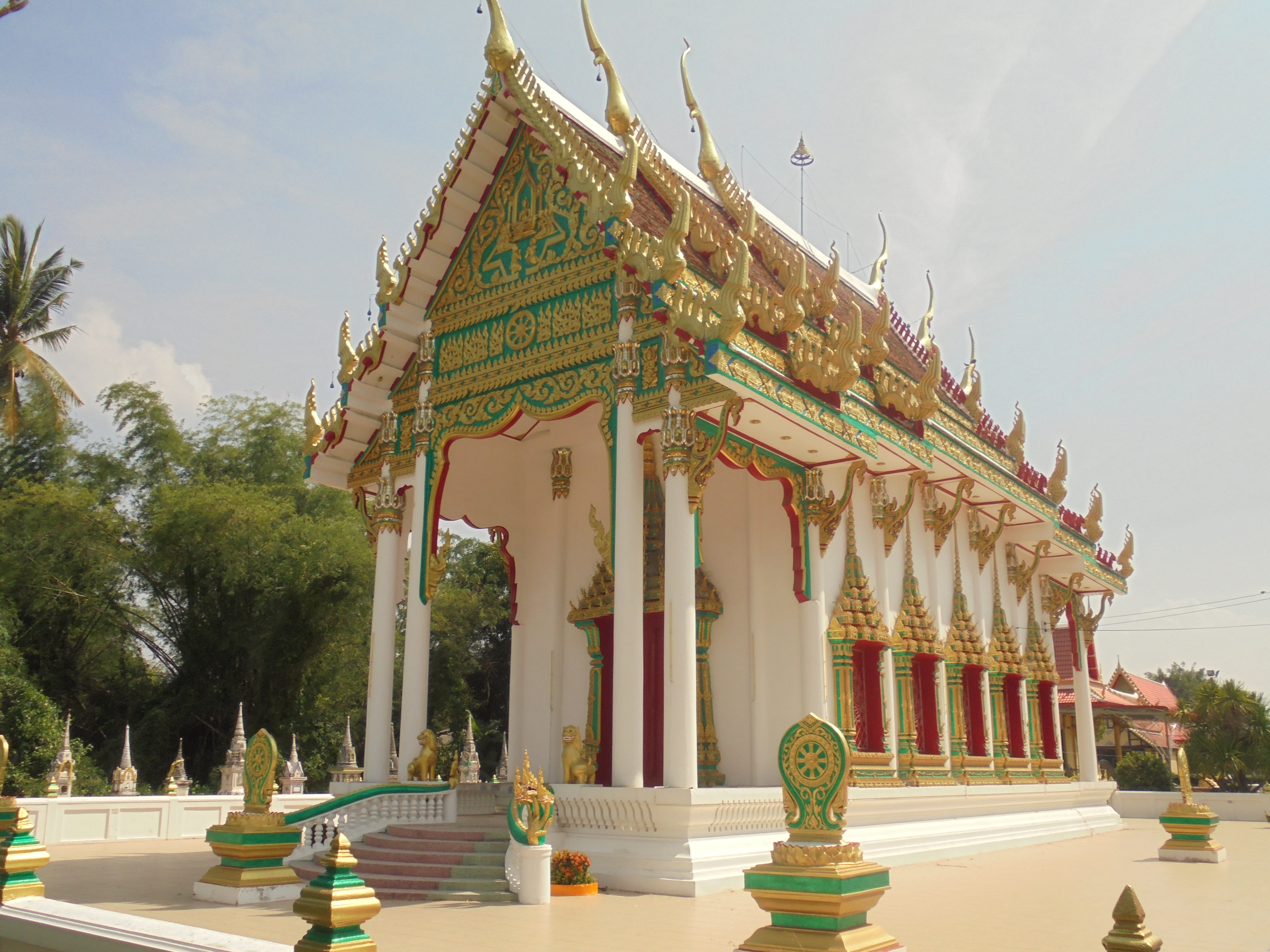
Ubosot of Wat Saeng Dao

Pak Thok subdistrict is home to the following active temples, where Theravada Buddhism is practised by local residents:

Temple name	Thai	Location
Wat Phai Khom Rattanaram	วัดไผ่ค่อมรัตนาราม	Moo1
Wat Pa Sak	วัดป่าสัก	Moo2
Wat Saeng Dao	วัดแสงดาว	Moo6
Wat Tha Tharut	วัดท่าทรุด	Moo7

== Economy ==
The following companies play a role in the employment service:

- CPAC - Moo4
- NBTC office 33 - Moo7

== Education ==
The following schools are located in Pak Thok subdistrict.

- Wat Phai Khom school - Moo1
- Pak Thok child development center - Moo5

== Healthcare ==
There is Pak Thok health-promoting hospital in Moo6.

== Transport ==
=== Roads ===
- Highway 126, Phitsanulok bypass road
- National road 1086, Phitsanulok-Wat Bot/Phrom Phiram route

=== Railway ===
Ban Tum railway station is in Pak Thok subdistrict - Moo1. In 2019 there were sold 282 tickets!

== Electricity ==
All households in Pak Thok subdistrict have access to the electricity grid of Provincial Electricity Authority (PEA).

== Waterworks ==
Of Pak Thok subdistrict 2,066 households, out of a total of 2,263 households, have access to the water network of Provincial Waterworks Authority (PWA). All households have access to the village water supply system in every village.

== Communications ==
All households in Pak Thok subdistrict have access to the mobile telephone network.
There is a private post office - Moo4
