= Chomphu, Phitsanulok =

Chomphu ชมพู
- Subdistrict
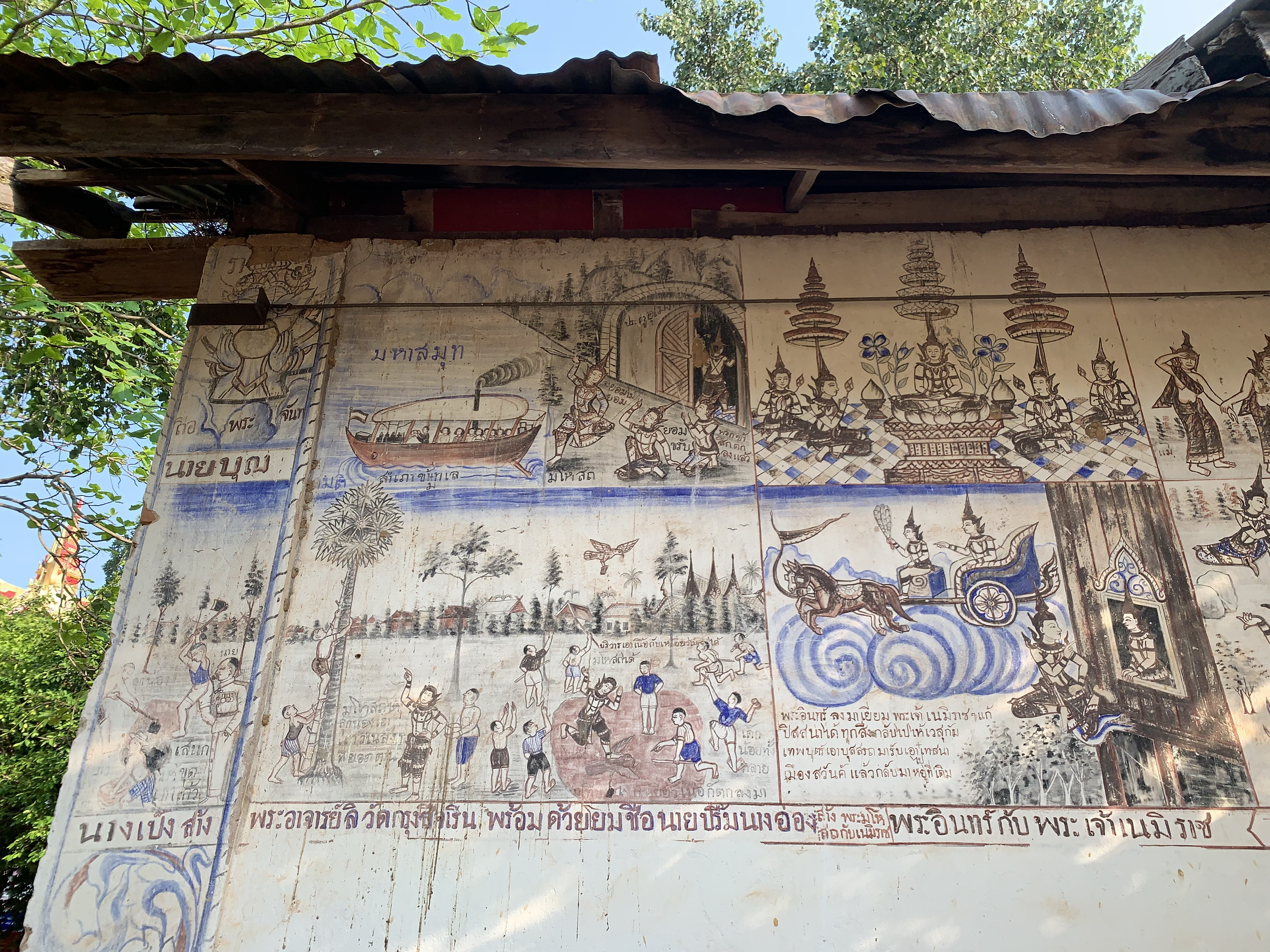
- Murals at Wat Nam Pat in Chomphu District
- Interactive map of Chomphu
- Coordinates: 16°41′00″N 100°40′00″E
- Country: Thailand
- Province: Phitsanulok
- District: Noen Maprang

Population (2005)
  - Total: 13,266
- Time zone: UTC+7 (ICT)
- Postal code: 65190
- Geocode: 650901

Chomphu (Thai: ชมพู, pronounced [t͡ɕʰōm.pʰūː]) is a subdistrict in the Noen Maprang District of Phitsanulok Province, Thailand.

== History ==
Chomphu, also colloquially known as Ban Chomphu (บ้านชมพู, pronounced [bâːn t͡ɕʰōm.pʰūː]) is regarded as the largest and most populous subdistrict of Noen Maprang District.

Originally, Chomphu was just a community in a remote area surrounded with forest. It used to be called Ban Sonphu when the locals first settled down as it was surrounded with thick forest and mountains. The area was once part of Nakhon Phamak District, Phitsanulok Province.

After the municipal zoning was made, the area used to be part of Wang Thong District and was called Ban Sonphu. However, today it is part of Noen Maprang District and its name has changed to Ban Chomphu (with the word phu (ภู) in this case meaning mountain). However, the spelling has changed and today's spelling has nothing to do with mountain anymore. (Note: The current spelling uses พู, which means pink.)

== Geography ==
The subdistrict lies within the Nan Basin, which is part of the Chao Phraya Watershed. The main water resource is canal Khlong Chomphu, an important natural attraction and part of Thung Salaeng Luang National Park.

== Administration ==
The following is a list of the subdistrict's mubans, which roughly correspond to villages:

| No. | English | Thai |
| 1 | Ban Chomphu Thai (South Ban Chomphu) | บ้านชมพูใต้ |
| 2 | Ban Nam Pat | บ้านน้ำปาด |
| 3 | Ban Chomphu Nuea (North Ban Chomphu) | บ้านชมพูเหนือ |
| 4 | Ban Sam Rang | บ้านซำรัง |
| 5 | Ban Pluak Ngam | บ้านปลวกง่าม |
| 6 | Ban Nong Ya Plong | บ้านหนองหญ้าปล้อง |
| 7 | Ban Rak Thai | บ้านรักไทย |
| 8 | Ban Pha Thai | บ้านเผ่าไทย |
| 9 | Ban Cham Thong | บ้านซำต้อง |
| 10 | Ban Nong Ibong | บ้านหนองอีป๋อง |
| 11 | Ban Rom Glao | บ้านร่มเกล้า |
| 12 | Ban Noen Khlo | บ้านเนินคล้อ |
| 13 | Ban Thung Ai Thak | บ้านทุ่งไอ้ตาก |
| 14 | Ban Nong Thap Ruea | บ้านหนองทับเรือ |
| 15 | Ban Sam Rang Thai | บ้านซำรังใต้ |

== Demography ==
Original locals migrated from Vientiane or Luang Prabang in Laos to be precise, during the World War II. They used to talk to others with traditional language, using today's impolite words.

== Biodiversity ==
In 2009, four new species of small freshwater fish were found in the world in Khlong Chomphu in Chomphu Subdistrict. Divided into three species of fish in the genus of Akysis and one species in the genus of Acantopsis. They are all endemic species.

== Places ==
- Wat Chomphu Temple
- Ban Chomphu Folk Museum
- Ban Sam Rang Cloth Weaving Group
