= Wang Thong district =

Wang Thong วังทอง
- District
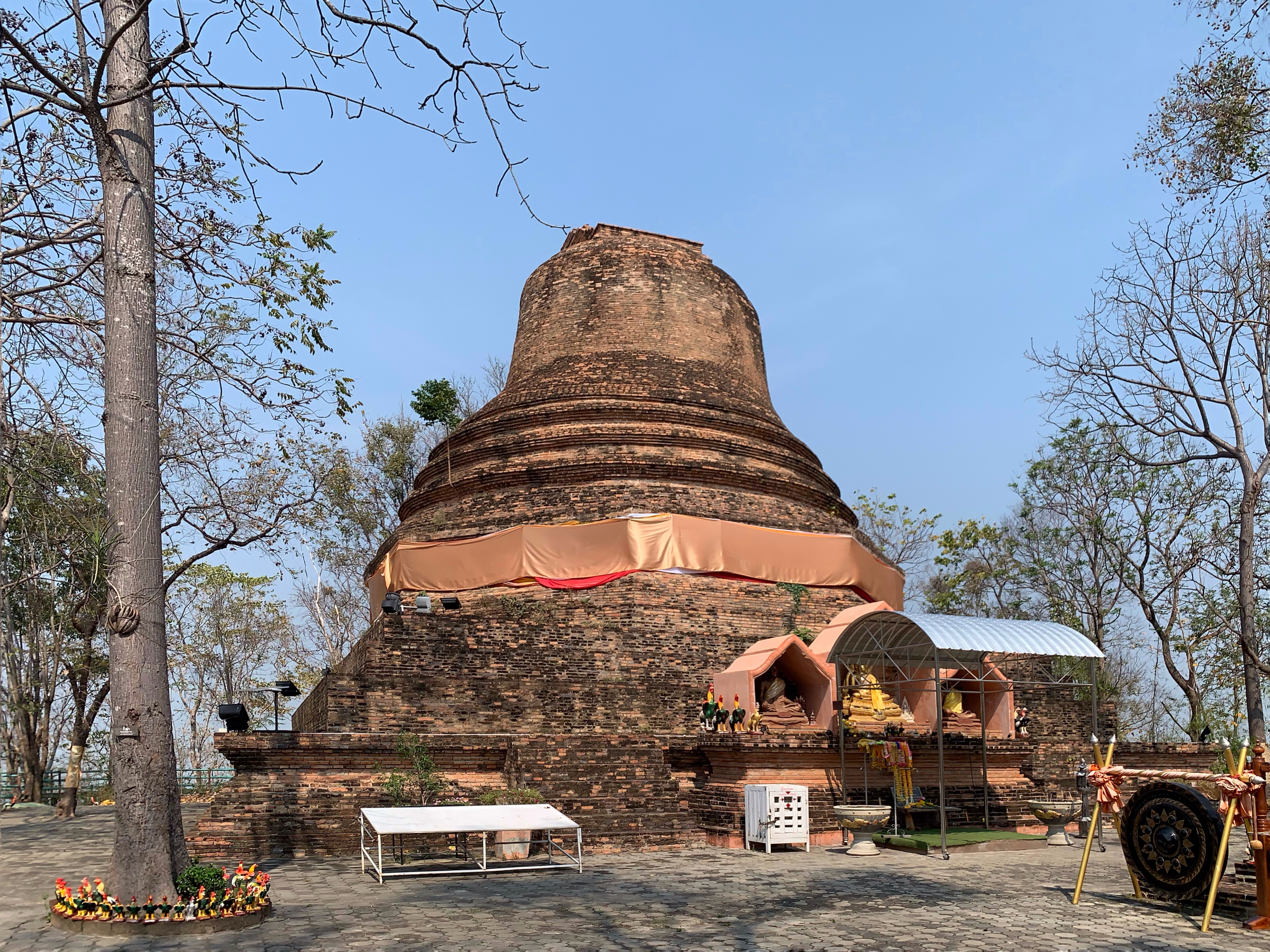
- The Stupa of Khao Samo Khleang

- District location in Phitsanulok province
- Coordinates: 16°49′27″N 100°25′43″E
- Country: Thailand
- Province: Phitsanulok
- Seat: Wang Thong

Area
  - Total: 1,687 km^{2} (651 sq mi)

Population (2025)
  - Total: 117,098
  - Density: 69/km^{2} (180/sq mi)
- Time zone: UTC+7 (ICT)
- Postcode: 65130
- Calling code: 055
- ISO 3166 code: TH-6508
- LAO code: 02650801

Wang Thong (Thai: วังทอง, pronounced [wāŋ tʰɔ̄ːŋ]) is a district (amphoe) of Phitsanulok province, lower northern region of Thailand.

== History ==
Wang Thong was established in 1895 as Nakhon Pa Mak District, named after the central tambon, the district office being located in Ban Sam Ruen. However, the original location was difficult to reach and also flooded every year, and the district office was moved to the east side of the Wang Thong River, where the Wang Thong Municipal Market now stands.

In 1928 the government created Bang Krathum district, and tambons Phai Lom, Noen Kum, and Nakhon Pa Mak were assigned to it. Tambons Kaeng Sopha and Ban Klang of Nakhon Thai district were reassigned to Wang Thong.

When the buildings on the east bank of Wang Thong River were washed away by a flood, the district office relocated to its present site. In 1931 the district name was changed to Pa Mak, finally designated as Wang Thong in 1939.

== Geography ==
=== Location ===
Neighboring districts are (from the south clockwise), Sak Lek of Phichit province, Bang Krathum, Mueang Phitsanulok, Wat Bot, Chat Trakan, Nakhon Thai of Phitsanulok Province, Khao Kho of Phetchabun province and Noen Maprang of Phitsanulok Province.

=== Nature ===
There is Thung Salaeng Luang National Park in Wang Nok Aen subdistrict and Khwae Noi National Park in Ban Klang subdistrict.

=== Rivers ===
Wang Thong lies within the Nan Basin, which is part of the Chao Phraya Watershed. The important water resource is Wang Thong River (Khek River). The Khwae Noi River and Tha Muen Ram River also flow through this district.

=== Swamps ===
The Bueng Rachanok Swamp is a popular tourist destination in the district.

== Administration ==
=== Provincial government ===
The district is divided into 11 subdistricts (tambons), which are further subdivided into 168 villages (mubans), as of 2025: 117,098 people of 48,379 families.

Map with eleven subdistricts

No	Subdistrict	Population	Villages
1	Wang Thong	17,974	15
2	Phan Chali	9,347	17
3	Mae Raka	6,908	15
4	Ban Klang	20,074	27
5	Wang Phikun	9,035	15
6	Kaeng Sopha	10,445	13
7	Tha Muen Ram	7,773	14
8	Wang Nok Aen	16,271	20
9	Nong Phra	6,672	12
10	Chai Nam	6,190	9
11	Din Thong	6,409	11
	Total population	117,098	168

=== Local government ===
Wang Thong is subdistrict municipality (thesaban tambon) which covers only three administrative villages of Wang Thong subdistrict. There are further 11 subdistrict administrative organizations (SAO). Wang Thong SAO is responsible for the remaining area of Wang Thong subdistrict. The other ten SAO's cover the whole subdistricts with the same name.

For FY2022, the revenues and expenditures of Wang Thong district were as follows:

Revenue of Wang Thong district per million baht
Total	Taxes, duties	Fees, fines	Property	Commerce	Varied	Subsidies	Others
772.1	340.7	3.6	3.8	0.8	0.5	399.9	22.6

Expenditure of Wang Thong district per million baht
Total	Central fund	Personnel	Operations	Investments	Subsidies	Others
394.6	20.6	143.5	93.0	95.1	39.2	3.2

The profit corresponds to 377.5 million baht (US$10.8 million).

== Healthcare ==
=== Government hospitals ===
There is one community hospital Wang Thong Hospital in Wang Thong with 68 beds.
There is one military hospital Fort Saritsena Hospital in Wang Nok Aen with 15 beds.

=== Health-promoting hospitals ===
There are twenty-one health-promoting hospitals in the district, of which; one in Chai Nam, Din Thong, Kaeng Sopha and Nong Phra and two in Mae Raka, Phan Chali, Tha Muen Ram, Wang Phikun and Wang Thong and three in Ban Klang and four in Wang Nok Aen.

== Infrastructure ==
=== Roads ===
- Highway 11 northbound: Wang Thong-Uttaradit-Lampang
- Highway 12 eastbound: Wang Thong-Phetchabun-Khon Kaen-Mukdahan
- Highway 11 southbound: Wang Thong-Sing Buri

=== Significant Settlements ===
The following settlements of the Wang Thong District are significant enough in size as to occupy multiple mubans:

- Town of Ban Wang Thong
- Ban Gok Mai Daeng
- Ban Din Thong
- Ban Sadao
- Ban Phan Chali
- Ban Supraron Phanom Thong
- Ban Nam Rin
- Ban Mae Raka
- Ban Kao Noi
- Ban Kaeng Gula
- Ban Kao Hom
- Ban Dong Phluang

=== Radio ===
- There is one radio station broadcast from Wang Thong, the Sathaanii Witthayu Ratthasaphaa (Parliament Radio Station). The frequency is 92.25 FM.

== Religion ==
There are a hundred and six Therevada Buddhist temples in the district.
Four in Chai Nam and Din Thong, seven in Nong Phra, eight in Mae Raka, ten in Kaeng Sopha and Wang Thong, eleven in Tha Muen Ram, twelve in Phan Chali, Wang Nok Aean and Wang Phikun, thirteen in Ban Klang.

== Attractions ==
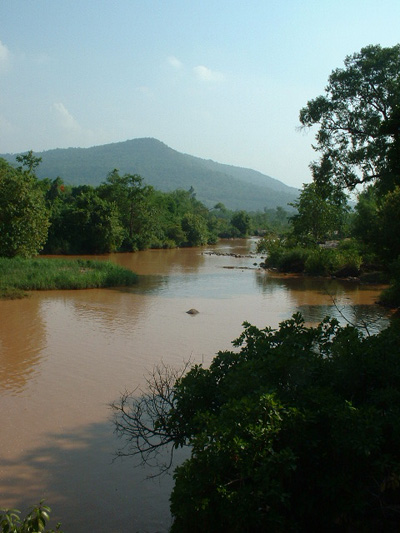
Khek River in rainy season, Wang Thong

- Thung Salaeng Luang National Park
- Kaeng Chet Khwae National Park
- Sakunothayan Arboretum
- Kaeng Song Waterfall
- Kaeng Sopha Waterfall
- Brotherly Villages Boat Race
- Bueng Rachanok Swamp

== Flooding ==
Wang Thong was hit by severe flooding in 2007. By 8 October 2007, flooding in the Wang Thong District had killed at least three people, and the district was declared a disaster zone.
