= Highway 11 (Thailand) =

Road in Thailand

National Highway 11
- ทางหลวงแผ่นดินหมายเลข 11
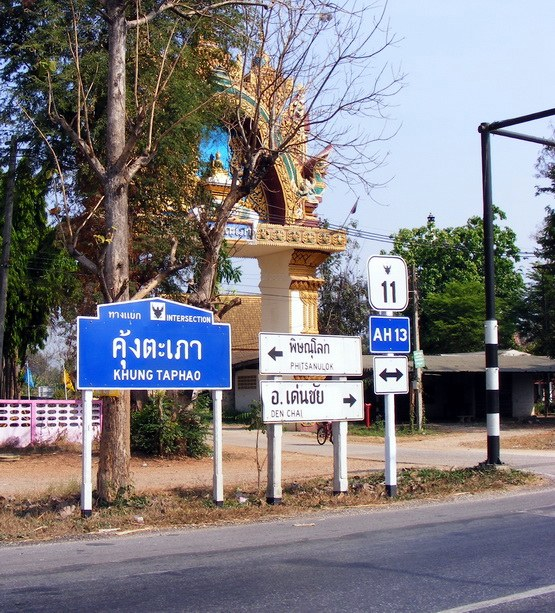

Route information
- Part of AH13
- Length: 563.984 km (350.443 mi)
- Existed: 1969–present

Major junctions
- South end: Hwy 32 in In Buri
- North end: Hwy 1004 in Chiang Mai

Location
- Country: Thailand

Highway system
- Highways in Thailand; Motorways; Asian Highways

Highway 11 (Thai: ทางหลวงแผ่นดินหมายเลข 11; Thang Luang Phaendin Mai Lek 11) is a national highway in Thailand.

== Road ==
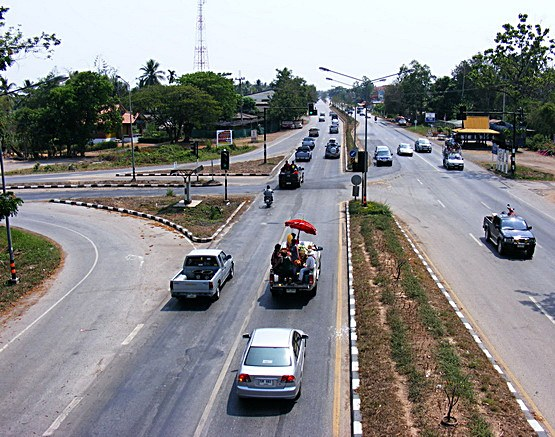
Khung Taphao, Uttaradit Intersection

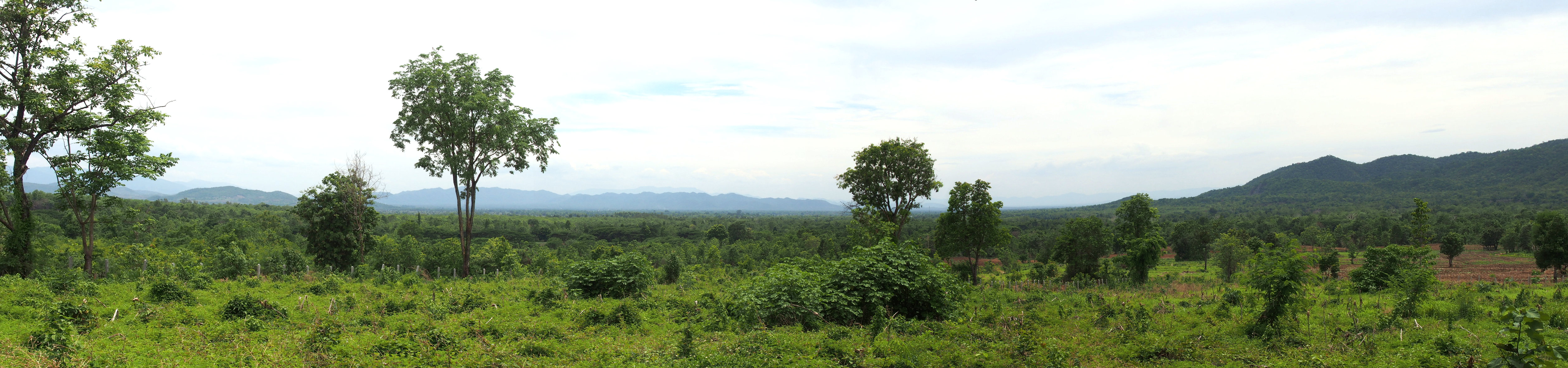
The Mae Tha valley in Lampang Province, west of Route 11. The mountains are part of the Phi Pan Nam Range

Considered as an alternative road for Route 1 to the North of Thailand. It begins in Amphoe In Buri, in Singburi Province, at the junction of Thailand Route 32 (National Road 32), and then runs north through Nakhon Sawan Province, Phichit Province, and Phitsanulok Province where, for approximately 10 kilometers, it merges with Highway 12. Next it passes through Uttaradit Province, Phrae Province, Lampang Province, Lamphun Province, and into Chiang Mai Province where, for the final 10 kilometers of the road, it is the so-called Superhighway, a bypass of the city of Chiang Mai. The Highway 11 ends at the intersection of the Superhighway with Huai Kaeo Road (National Road 1004), northwest of the old city of Chiang Mai. In 2019, the four-lane expansion between In Buri and Takhli began.
