= Nam Pat Wildlife Sanctuary =

Wildlife Sanctuary in Uttaradit, Thailand

- เขตรักษาพันธุ์สัตร์ป่าน้ำปาด
- IUCN category Ia (strict nature reserve)
- Location within Thailand
- Location: Uttaradit Province, Thailand
- Nearest city: Uttaradit
- Coordinates: 17°52′N 101°00′E
- Area: 508 km^{2} (196 sq mi)
- Established: 2001
- Governing body: Department of National Parks, Wildlife and Plant Conservation

Nam Pat Wildlife Sanctuary (Thai: เขตรักษาพันธุ์สัตว์ป่าน้ำปาด; RTGS: Khet Raksa Phan Satpa Nam Pat) is a wildlife sanctuary in Ban Khok, Fak Tha and Nam Pat districts of Thailand's Uttaradit Province. The sanctuary covers an area of 508 square kilometres (196 sq mi) and was established in 2001.

== Geography ==
Nam Pat Wildlife Sanctuary is located about 80 kilometres (50 mi) east of Uttaradit town in Ban Khok, Na Khum, Muang Chet Ton subdistrcts of Ban Khok District, Fak Tha, Song Khon, Ban Siao and Song Hong subdistricts of Fak Tha District and Huai Mun, Nam Phai, Den Lek and Ban Fai subdistricts of Nam Pat District.
The sanctuary's area is 508 square kilometres (196 sq mi) and is neighbouring Phu Soi Dao National Park to the east, Phu Miang-Phu Thong Wildlife Sanctuary to the south, Ton Sak Yai National Park to the southwest, Lam Nam Nan National Park to the west and Mae Charim Wildlife Sanctuary to the northwest. Nam Pat rises to the west, a major branch of the Nan River.

== Topography ==
Landscape is covered by forested mountains, such as Khao Daen 1,041 metres (3,415 ft), Phu Hut 1,043 metres (3,422 ft), Phu Luang 1,044 metres (3,425 ft) and Phu Nong Don 1,027 metres (3,369 ft). The area is divided into 38% high slope mountain area (shallow valleys, mountain tops, upper slopes and deeply incised streams), 58% hill slope area (open slopes, midslope ridges and u-shaped valleys) and 4% plains.

== Flora ==
The sanctuary features mixed deciduous forest (64%), dry deciduous forest (29%), dry evergreen forest (3%), agricultural area (2%), abandoned farms (1%) and degraded forest (1%).

== Fauna ==
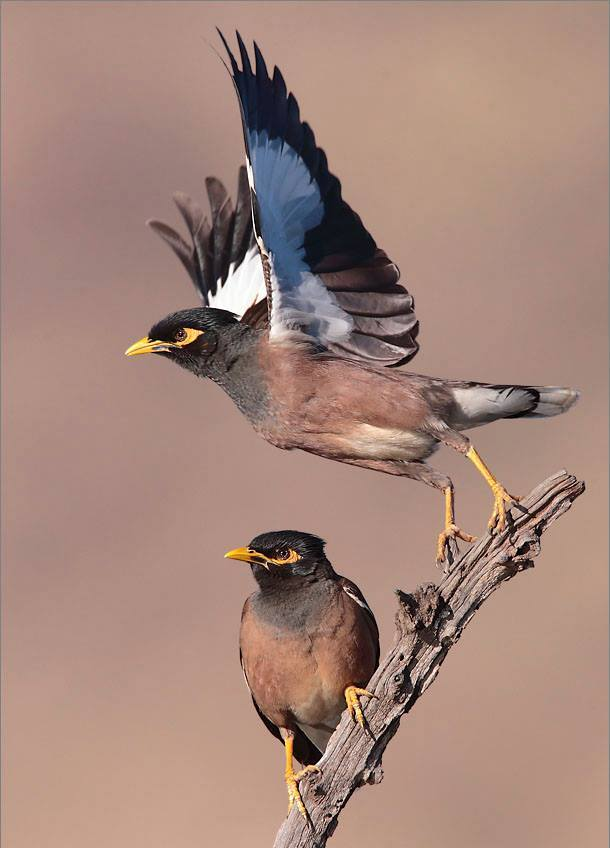
Common myna

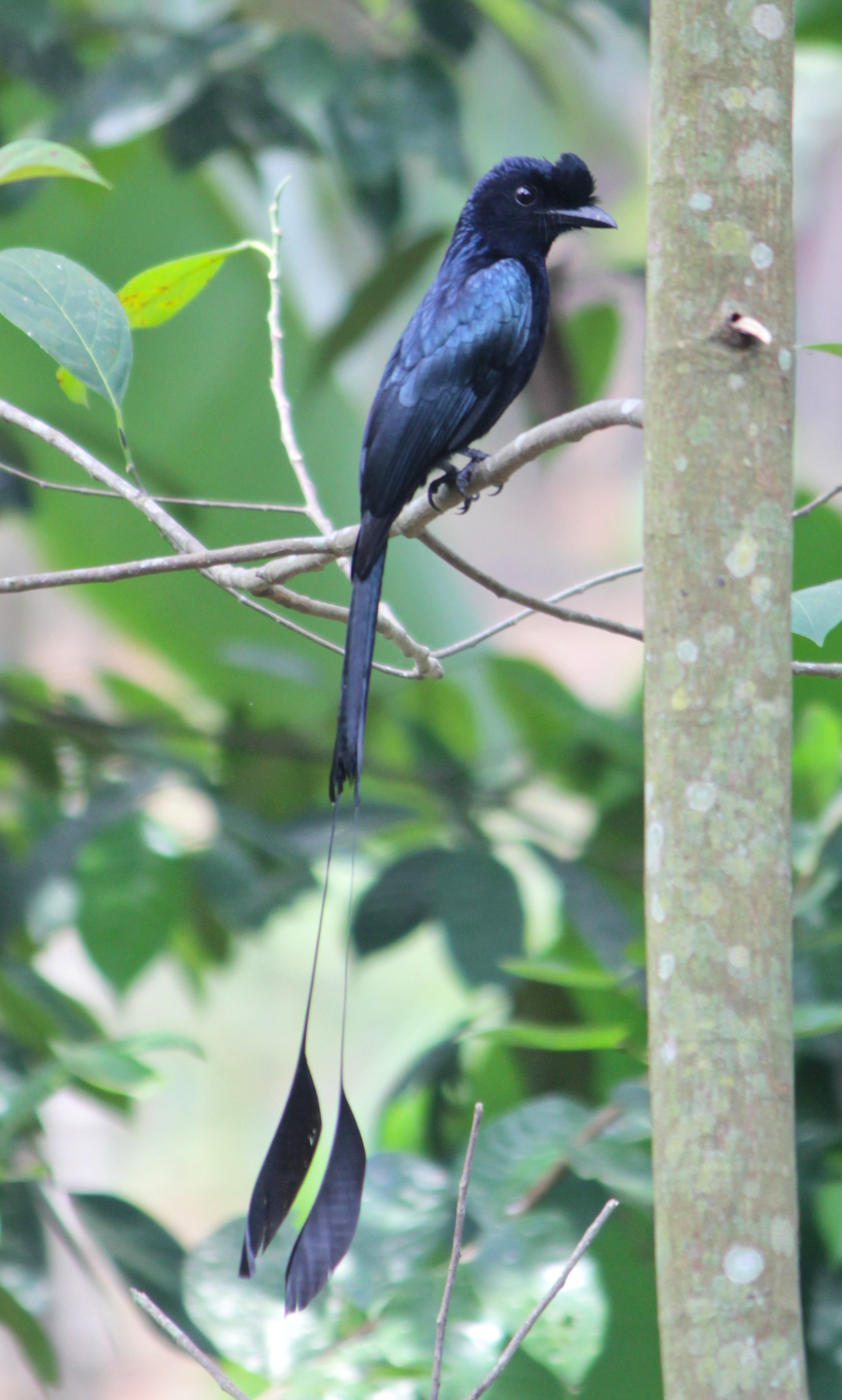
Greater racket-tailed drongo

Mammals in the sanctuary are:

- Asian black bear (Ursus thibetanus)
- Asian elephant (Elaphus maximus)
- Asian palm civet (Paradoxurus hermaphroditus)
- Asian wild dog (Cuan alpinus)
- Barking deer (Muntiacus spp.)
- Binturong (Arctictis binturong)
- Fishing cat (Prionailurus viverrinus)
- Macaque (Cercophithecidae macaca spp.)
- Mainland serow (Capricornis sumatraensis)
- Malayan porcupine (Hystrix brachyura)
- Mousedeer (Tragulus spp.)
- Wild boar (Sus scrofa)

Birds, of which passerine species:

- Bulbul (Pucnonotidae spp.)
- Common hill myna (Gracula religiosa)
- Common myna (Acridotheres tristis)
- Common tailorbird (Orthotomus sutotius)
- Greater racket-tailed drongo (Dicrurus paradiseus)
- Red-billed blue magpie (Urocissa erythroryncha)

and non-passerine species:

- Chinese francolin (Francolinus pintadeanus)
- Common emerald dove (Chalophaps indica)
- Falcon (Falco spp.)
- Greater coucal (Centropus sinensis)
- Green-legged partridge (Tropicoperdix chloropus)
- Green pigeon (Treron spp.)
- Grey peacock-pheasant (Polyplectron bicalcaratum)
- Pheasant (Phasianidae spp.)
- Red collared dove (Streptopelia tranquebarica)
- Red junglefowl (Gallus gallus)
- White-breasted waterhen (Amaurornis pheonicurus)

Reptiles in the sanctuary are:

- Asian palm pit viper (Trimeresurus spp.)
- Asian water monitor (Varanus salvator)
- Bengal monitor (Varanus bengalensis)
- Big-headed turtle (Platysternon megacephalum)
- Burmese python (Python bivittatus)
- Cobra (Naja spp.)
- Elongated tortoise (Indotestudo elongata)
- King cobra (Ophiophagus hannah)
- Reticulated python (Malayopython reticulatus)
- Siamese Russell's viper (Daboia siamensis)
- Tokay gecko (Gekko gecko)

== Location ==
Nam Pat Wildlife Sanctuary in overview PARO 11 (Phitsanulok)

12) Nam Pat Wildlife Sanctuary in overview PARO 11 (Phitsanulok)

	Wildlife sanctuary				
11	Mae Charim	12	Nam Pat	13	Phu Khat
14	Phu Miang-Phu Thong	15	Phu Pha Daeng	16	Tabo-Huai Yai
	National park			1	Khao Kho
2	Khwae Noi	3	Lam Nam Nan	4	Nam Nao
5	Namtok Chat Trakan	6	Phu Hin Rong Kla	7	Phu Soi Dao
8	Tat Mok	9	Thung Salaeng Luang	10	Ton Sak Yai

== See also ==
- List of protected areas of Thailand
- DNP - Nam Pat Wildlife Sanctuary
- List of Protected Areas Regional Offices of Thailand
