= Mae Charim Wildlife Sanctuary =

Protected area in Thailand

- เขตรักษาพันธุ์สัตร์ป่าแม่จริม
- IUCN category Ia (strict nature reserve)
- Location within Thailand
- Location: Uttaradit Province, Thailand
- Nearest city: Uttaradit
- Coordinates: 18°06′N 100°51′E
- Area: 660 km^{2} (250 sq mi)
- Established: 1998
- Governing body: Department of National Parks, Wildlife and Plant Conservation

Mae Charim Wildlife Sanctuary (Thai: เขตรักษาพันธุ์สัตว์ป่าแม่จริม; RTGS: Khet Raksa Phan Satpa Mae Charim) is a wildlife sanctuary in Ban Khok, Fak Tha and Nam Pat districts of Thailand's Uttaradit Province. The sanctuary covers an area of 660 square kilometres (250 sq mi) and was established in 1998.

== Geography ==
Mae Charim Wildlife Sanctuary is located about 85 km (53 mi) northeast of Uttaradit town in Bo Bia, Muang Chet Ton subdistricts, Ban Khok District and Fak Tha, Song Khon, Ban Siao, Song Hong subdistricts, Fak Tha District and Den Lek, Tha Faek subdistricts, Nam Pat District of Uttaradit Province.
The sanctuary's area is 660 square kilometres (250 sq mi) and is neighbouring Nam Pat Wildlife Sanctuary to the southeast and Lam Nam Nan National Park to the southwest and abutting Si Nan National Park to the west. The small streams are tributaries of the Nan River and Nam Pat.

== Topography ==
Landscape is covered by forested mountains, such as Phu Chan, Phu Chang Yai, Phu Heliym, Phu Khem, Phu Pha Dan, Phu Wang. The area is divided into 39% high slope mountain area (shallow valleys, upper slopes, mountain tops and deeply incised streams), 57% hill slope area (open slopes, midslope ridges and u-shaped valleys) and 2% plains.

== Flora ==
The sanctuary features mixed deciduous forest (86%), dry evergreen forest (5%), dry deciduous forest (4%), agricultural area (3%) and savanna (2%).

== Fauna ==
Mammals in the sanctuary are:

- Asian black bear (Ursus thibetanus)
- Asian elephant (Elaphus maximus)
- Asian wild dog (Cuan alpinus)
- Banteng (Bos javanicus)
- Barking deer (Muntiacus spp.)

Birds, sightings of some 70 species, of which 40 passerine species from 21 families,
represented by one species:

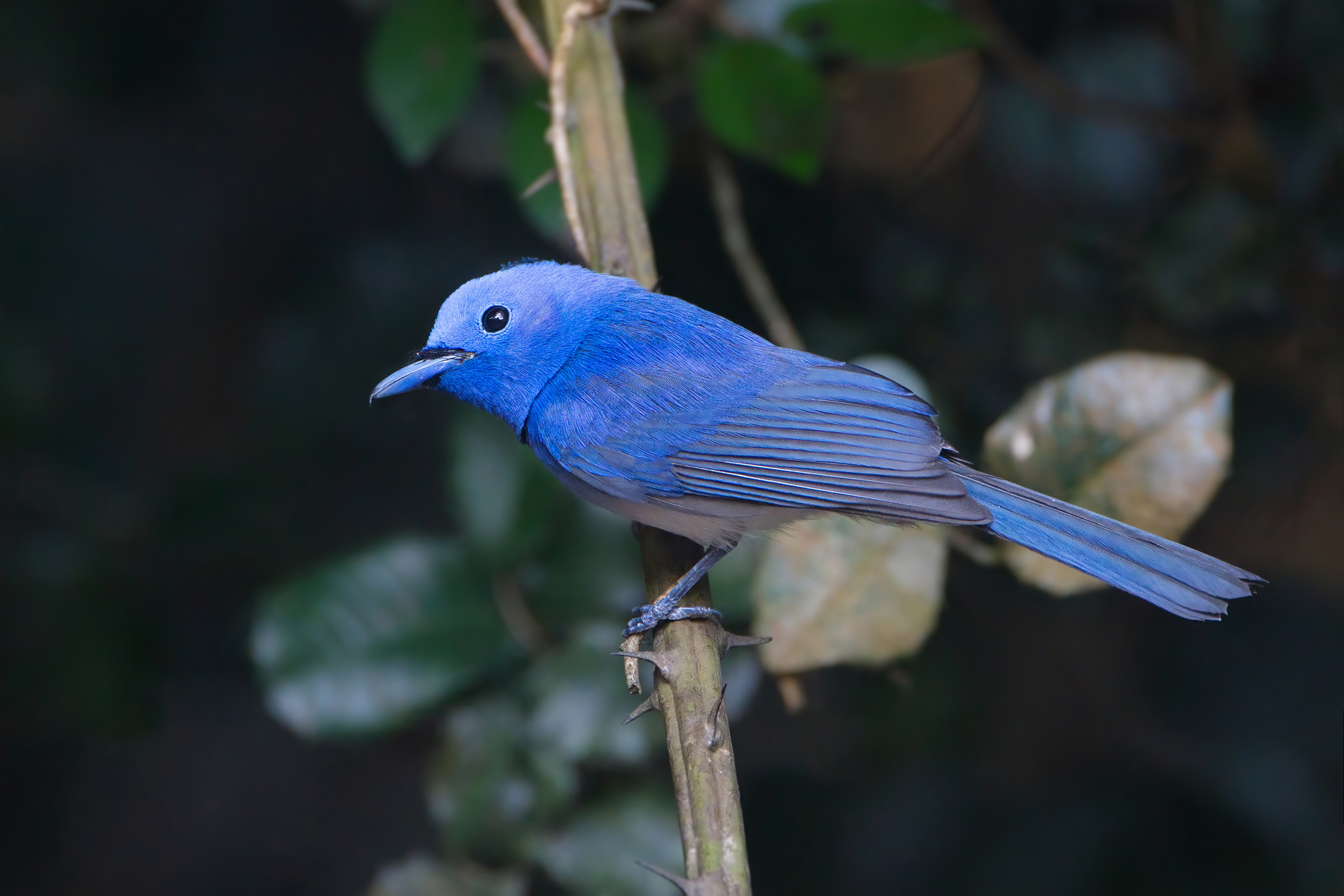
Black-naped monarch

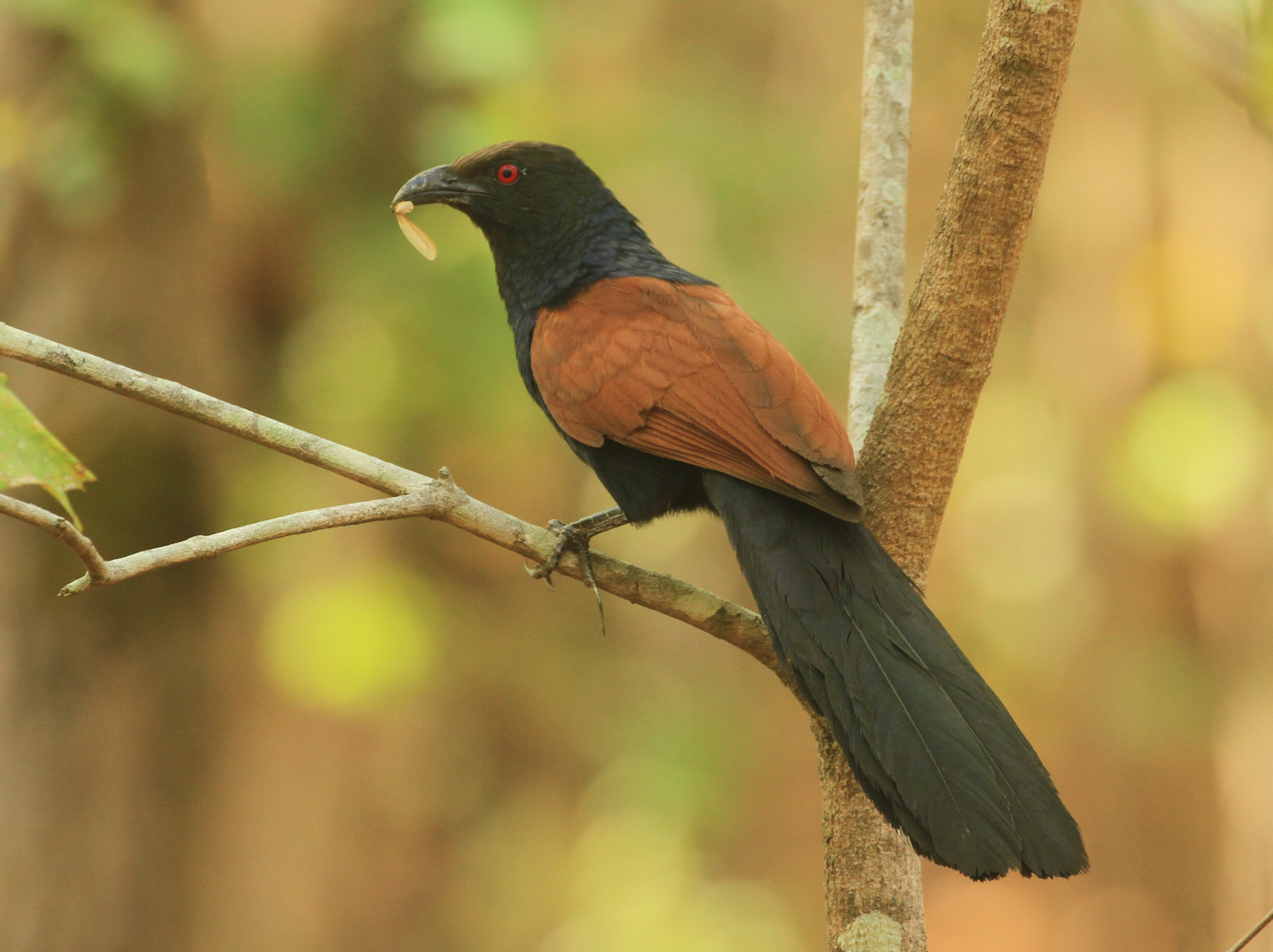
Greater coucal

- Ashy woodswallow
- Barn swallow
- Black-crested bulbul
- Black-naped monarch
- Blue pitta
- Brown shrike
- Common iora
- Golden-fronted leafbird
- Greater racket-tailed drongo
- Hill blue flycatcher
- Pin-striped tit-babbler
- Puff-throated babbler
- Radde's warbler
- Ruby-cheeked sunbird
- Rufescent prinia
- Rufous treepie
- Scarlet-backed flowerpecker
- Slender-billed oriole
- Velvet-fronted nuthatch
- White-crested laughingthrush
- White-rumped munia

and some 30 non-passerine species from 12 families, represented by one species:

- Asian barred owlet
- Chinese pond heron
- Collared falconet
- Coppersmith barbet
- Crested serpent eagle
- Crested treeswift
- Greater coucal
- Grey-headed woodpecker
- Himalayan swiftlet
- Indochinese roller
- Red junglefowl
- Thick-billed green pigeon

== Location ==
Mae Charim Wildlife Sanctuary in overview PARO 11 (Phitsanulok)

11) Mae Charim Wildlife Sanctuary in overview PARO 11 (Phitsanulok)

	Wildlife sanctuary				
11	Mae Charim	12	Nam Pat	13	Phu Khat
14	Phu Miang-Phu Thong	15	Phu Pha Daeng	16	Tabo-Huai Yai
	National park			1	Khao Kho
2	Khwae Noi	3	Lam Nam Nan	4	Nam Nao
5	Namtok Chat Trakan	6	Phu Hin Rong Kla	7	Phu Soi Dao
8	Tat Mok	9	Thung Salaeng Luang	10	Ton Sak Yai

== See also ==
- List of protected areas of Thailand
- DNP - Mae Charim Wildlife Sanctuary
- List of Protected Areas Regional Offices of Thailand
