= Wat Tham Chetawan =

Buddhist temple in Nan province, Thailand

- วัดถ้ำเชตวัน
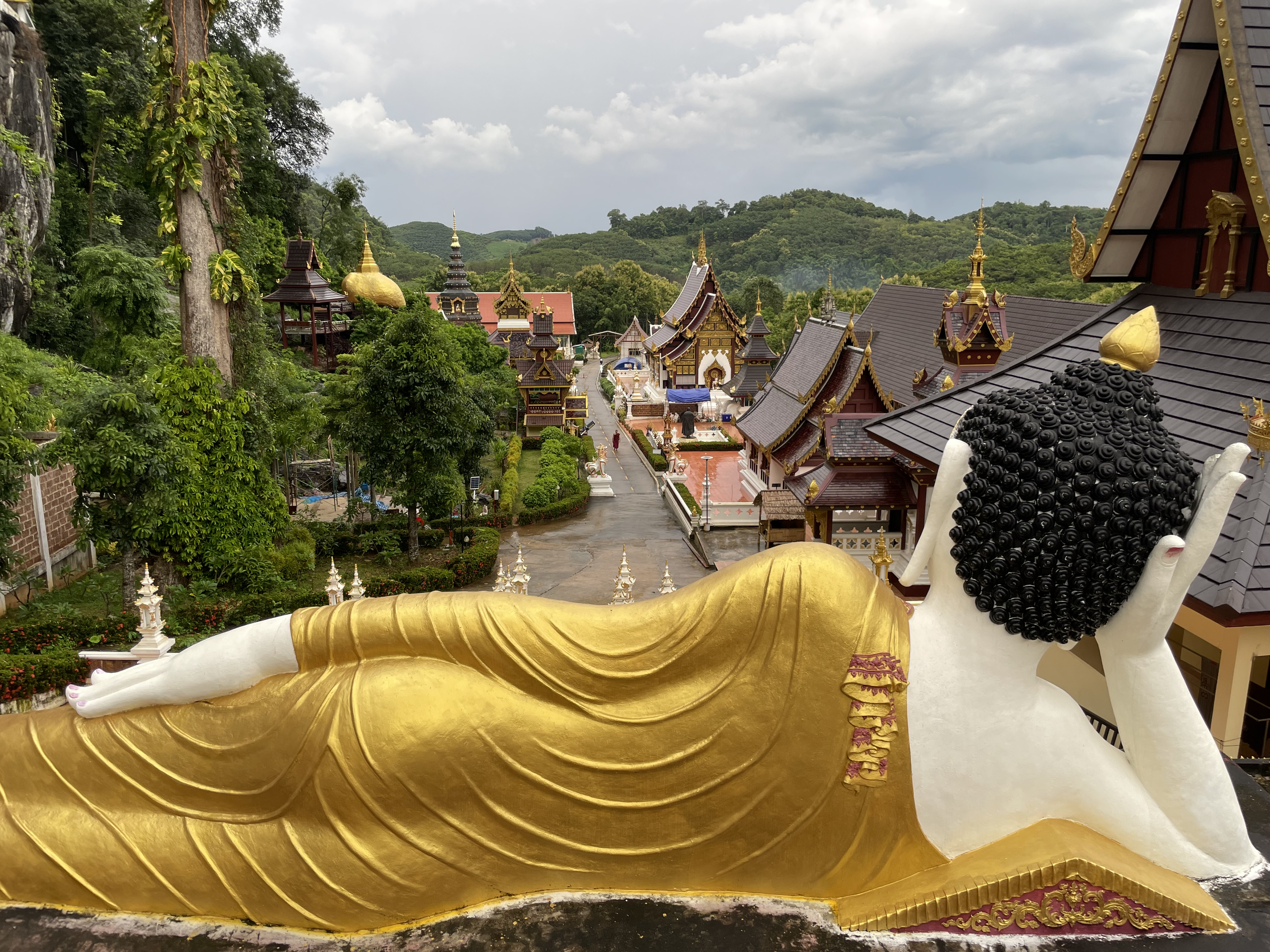
- The reclining Buddha overlooking the temple complex

- Location within Thailand

Religion
- Affiliation: Theravada Buddhism
- Sect: Maha Nikaya

Location
- Location: Santha subdistrict, Na Noi district, Nan province
- Country: Thailand
- Coordinates: 18.2727996°N 100.5781288°E

Architecture
- Founder: Khruba Noi Yanwichai
- Established: 28 February 2023 (temple registration)

Wat Tham Chetawan (Thai: วัดถ้ำเชตวัน), also known locally as Wat Khruba Noi (Thai: วัดครูบาน้อย), is a Theravada Buddhist temple in Santha subdistrict, Na Noi district, Nan province, northern Thailand. It stands in a wooded limestone canyon around a group of caves called Tham Chetawan. The cave was in Buddhist religious use by at least 1885, but the modern complex was developed from a long-neglected area by the monk Khruba Noi Yanwichai around 2012–2013 and was formally registered as a temple by Thailand's National Office of Buddhism on 28 February 2023.

Khruba Noi undertook a solitary retreat in one of the caves from 2014 to 2017, which drew national media attention, and the site later featured in national tourism coverage of Nan. The cave is also the type locality of a millipede species described in 2021.

== Historical cave site ==
Tham Chetawan was a place of Buddhist worship well before the present temple. Two inscriptions found in the cave are catalogued in the database of inscriptions in Thailand maintained by the Sirindhorn Anthropology Centre, a public agency under the Ministry of Culture; both are attributed to Tham Chetawan in Santha, Na Noi district, Nan province.

The older inscription, dated 1885 (2428 BE), is carved on the base of a wooden Buddha image in the Māravijaya attitude and recorded by the National Library of Thailand as นน. 2131. It states that Pho Saen Thanasombat and his family had the image made to sustain Buddhism; it is written in Tham Lanna characters in the Pali and Thai languages, and provides dated evidence of worship at the site by 1885. A second inscription, dated 1930 (2473 BE), is a rectangular black slate slab of nineteen lines (register นน. 2130) recording that, under Sathu Chao Chanthayanarangsi together with relatives, disciples and lay supporters, two Buddha images, a chedi, a vihara sheltering a Buddha footprint, the footprint altar, a boundary wall and a nāga staircase were built in the cave, completed and celebrated the same year. The Sirindhorn Anthropology Centre entry is based on an epigraphic study by Yutthaphon Naksuk published in 2008. They document religious use of the cave before the modern temple was registered in 2023.

== Modern development ==
Around 2012–2013 Khruba Noi, a monk of the khruba (Lan Na) tradition, developed the then-neglected cave area into a Buddhist site known as Phutthasathan Tham Chetawan (พุทธสถานถ้ำเชตวัน). The complex is built in the Lan Na style and includes a vihara, a large assembly hall, monks' quarters, a chedi, a 15-metre (49 ft) reclining Buddha, a white-jade Buddha image, a drum tower, natural caves and a museum. In 2025 Daily News credited Khruba Noi with transforming the previously neglected area into a Buddhist site and meditation centre.

From 12 July 2014 to 15 October 2017 Khruba Noi undertook a solitary retreat in one of the caves, lasting three years, three months and three days. He emerged on 15 October 2017 to large crowds, and the event, together with his years of unshaven hair, attracted national media coverage and public debate.

During a multi-site enforcement operation in May 2015, while Khruba Noi was still in retreat, district officials asked the temple committee to open the barred entrance to the cave. The request was refused, and about 1,000 Na Noi residents gathered outside the district office, accusing the officials of disturbing the retreat and demanding their transfer; the officials denied attempting a forced entry and agreed to seek reassignment.

== Temple status ==
On 4 November 2022 the Nan Provincial Office of Buddhism visited Khruba Noi to advise on the application to establish the temple and a Pariyattitham school. The site was registered as a community temple (wat ratsadon) of the Maha Nikaya fraternity, under the name Wat Tham Chetawan and temple code 66155040001, by the National Office of Buddhism on 28 February 2023. It was granted its visungkhamsima—the royal grant of consecrated ground for an ordination hall (ubosot)—by an announcement of the Office of the Prime Minister dated 25 March 2025 and published in the Royal Gazette on 10 April 2025, with a designated boundary of 13 by 26 metres (43 by 85 ft).

In 2023 the temple was among the 25 finalist attractions—five of them in the North—of the Tourism Authority of Thailand's "Unseen New Chapters" campaign, and in 2024 the authority listed it among five recommended sites in Nan in a national travel guide.

== The cave in scientific literature ==
Tham Chetawan is the type locality of Glyphiulus promdami, a cave-dwelling millipede described as a new species in the journal ZooKeys in 2021 from a holotype collected in the cave in 2018. An updated catalogue of the millipedes of Thailand published in 2023 confirmed the record from "Chetawan Cave, Na Noi District, Nan". The species has also been recorded from Tham La-ong in Nan and from Tham Pha Phrai Wan in neighbouring Phrae province.

== Khruba Noi ==
Khruba Noi Yanwichai (1989–2023), who developed the site, was a Theravada monk of the khruba tradition and a disciple of Khruba Boonchum; he received full ordination in 2009 at Wat Santha in Na Noi district. He died at the temple on 31 August 2023, aged 34, leaving a testament that bequeathed the temple's property to the temple itself under the governance of its abbot and committee.

== Gallery ==
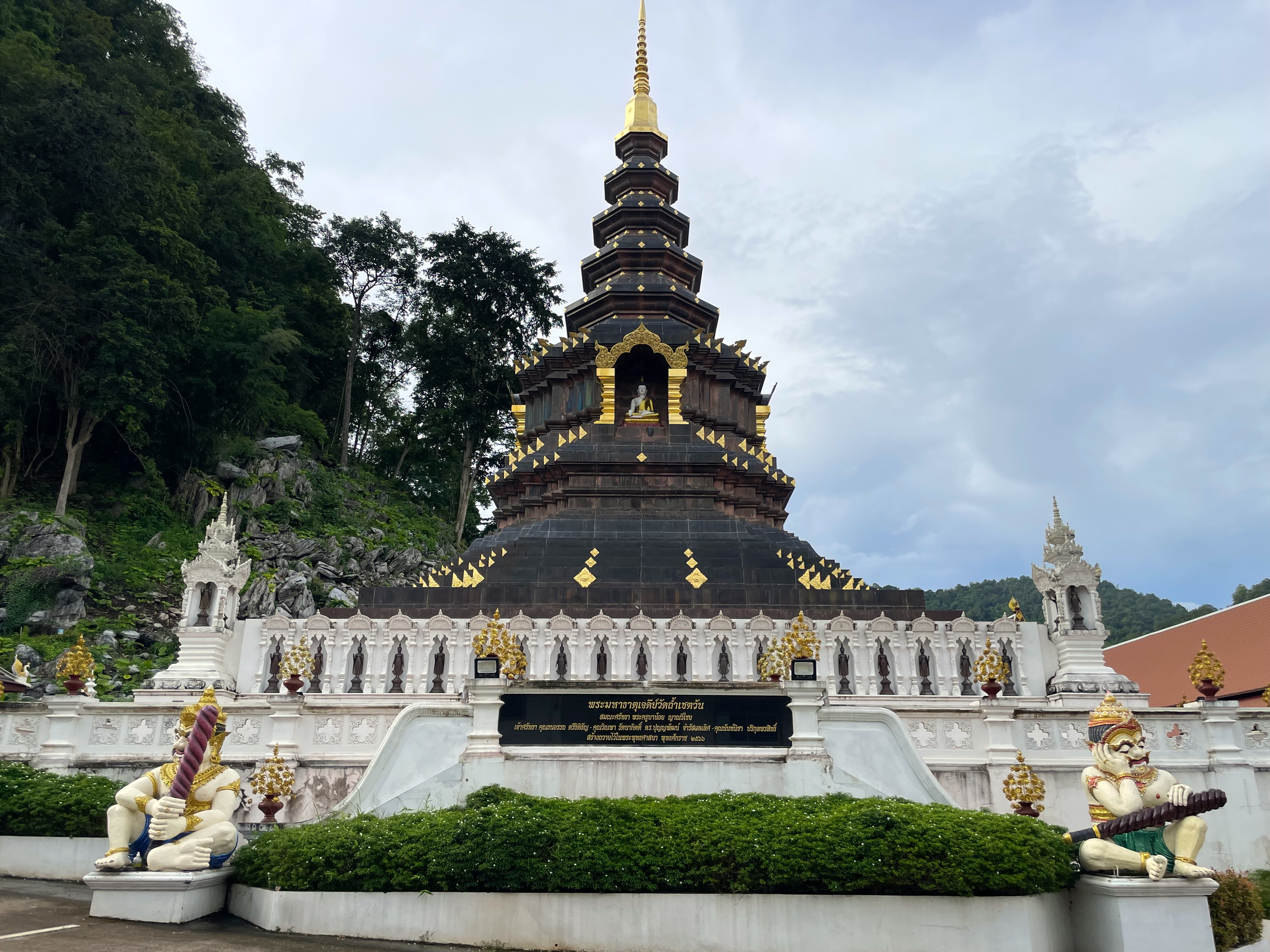
The Phra Mahathat chedi

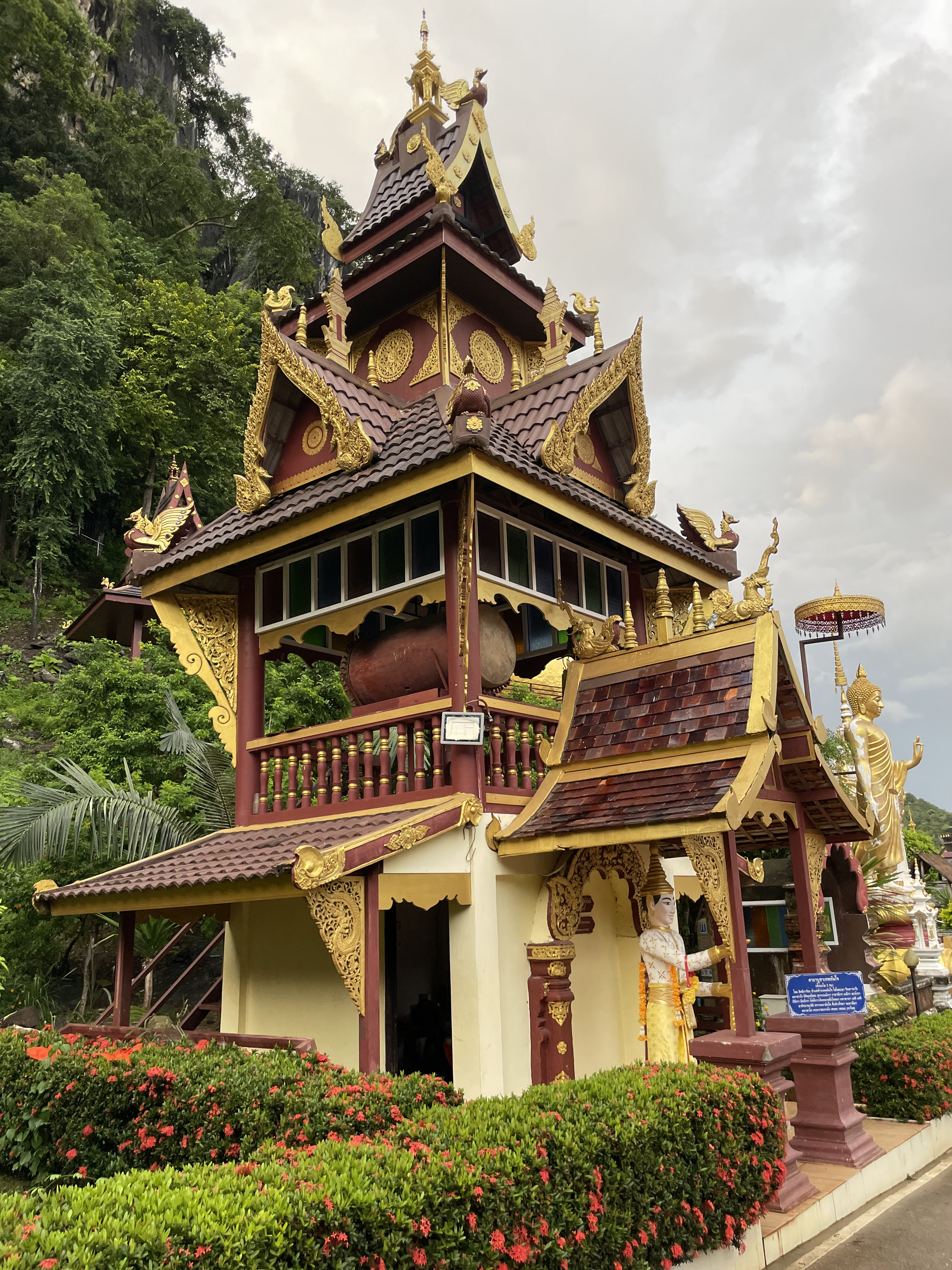
The drum tower

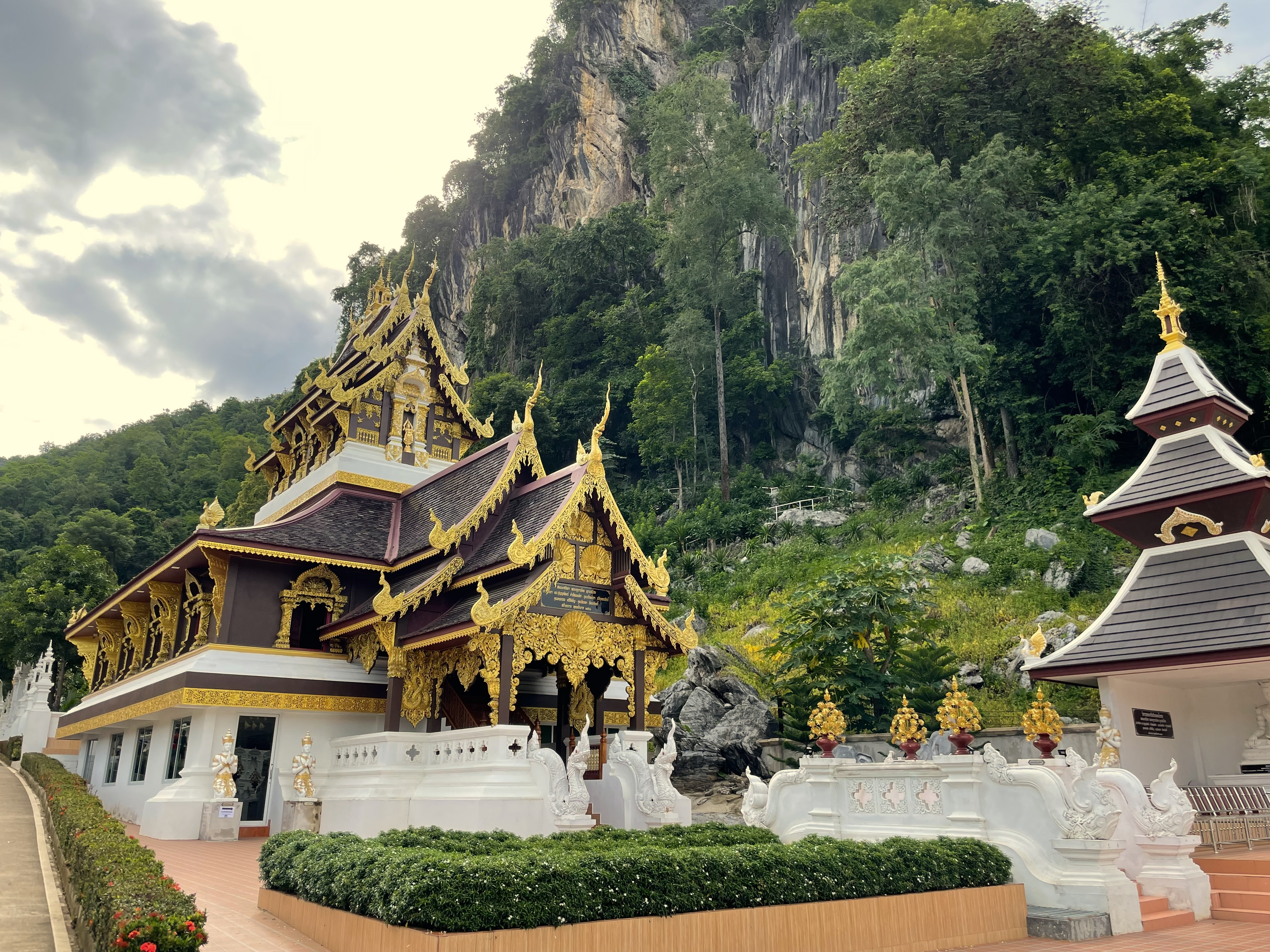
The museum, below the limestone cliff
