= Khruba Noi Yanwichai =

Thai Buddhist monk (1989–2023)

- Portrait of Khruba Noi at Wat Tham Chetawan
- Title: Khruba

Personal life
- Born: Natthawut; 25 March 1989 Na Noi district, Nan province, Thailand
- Died: 31 August 2023 (aged 34) Wat Tham Chetawan, Na Noi district, Nan province, Thailand

Religious life
- Religion: Buddhism
- Temple: Wat Tham Chetawan
- School: Theravada
- Dharma name: Yanwichayo (ญาณวิชชโย)
- Ordination: 13 December 2009

Senior posting
- Teacher: Khruba Boonchum

Khruba Noi Yanwichai (also romanized Kruba Noi Yanwichai; Thai: ครูบาน้อย ญาณวิไชย; 25 March 1989 – 31 August 2023), born Natthawut, was a Thai Theravada Buddhist monk of the khruba (Lan Na) tradition in northern Thailand. He developed the Buddhist site at Tham Chetawan in Na Noi district, Nan province, into what became Wat Tham Chetawan (Thai: วัดถ้ำเชตวัน), and attracted national media attention during and after a solitary cave retreat there lasting three years, three months and three days (2014–2017).

His ascetic practices, including the hair he left uncut throughout the retreat, drew public debate in Thailand. He died in 2023, aged 34, leaving handwritten aphorisms later reported in the national press and a testament that directed an austere funeral with cremation on the day of his death.

== Early life and monastic formation ==
Khruba Noi was born on 25 March 1989 in the Na Noi district of Nan province, the fourth of five children. His lay name was Natthawut, recorded in contemporary press coverage as "Khruba Noi Natthawut Yanwichai". He was ordained as a novice on 25 March 2002 at Wat Na Daeng.

According to a biography published by Thai PBS, his religious training took him from his home temple to Wat Benchamabophit in Bangkok for scriptural study, then to the monk Khruba In at Wat San Pa Yang Luang and to Wat Huai Bong in Li district, Lamphun province, and finally to the forest monk Khruba Boonchum, whose disciple he became. PPTV likewise described him as a disciple of Khruba Boonchum. He received full ordination as a bhikkhu on 13 December 2009 at Wat Santha in Na Noi district, taking the Pali ordination name Yanwichayo (ญาณวิชชโย; Ñāṇavijjayo); he is generally known by the form Yanwichai (ญาณวิไชย).

Before establishing Wat Tham Chetawan, Khruba Noi took part in building Wat Phra That Si Sangkharatnakhiri (วัดพระธาตุศรีสังฆรัตนคีรี) in Na Noi district; its foundation stone was laid on 14 May 2007. A government tourism directory, as well as Komchadluek and Thai PBS, credit him with the work.

== Wat Tham Chetawan and the cave retreat ==
Around 2012–2013 Khruba Noi developed a Buddhist site, known as Phutthasathan Tham Chetawan (พุทธสถานถ้ำเชตวัน), around a group of caves in Santha subdistrict, Na Noi district. The complex includes a Lan Na-style vihara, a large assembly hall, monks' quarters, a 15-metre (49 ft) reclining Buddha, a white-jade Buddha image, natural caves and a museum. It is also known locally as Wat Khruba Noi (วัดครูบาน้อย). In 2025, Daily News credited Khruba Noi with transforming a previously neglected area into a Buddhist site and meditation centre. The site was formally registered as a temple (wat), under the name Wat Tham Chetawan, by Thailand's National Office of Buddhism on 28 February 2023.

From 12 July 2014 to 15 October 2017 Khruba Noi undertook a solitary retreat in one of the caves lasting three years, three months and three days. During a multi-site enforcement operation in May 2015, district officials asked the temple committee to open the barred entrance to the cave. The request was refused, and about 1,000 Na Noi residents gathered outside the district office, accusing the officials of disturbing Khruba Noi's retreat and demanding their transfer. The officials denied attempting a forced entry and agreed to seek reassignment.

In November 2016, while he was still in retreat, former prime minister Yingluck Shinawatra and members of the Pheu Thai Party held a kathina robe-offering ceremony at the temple; the daily Matichon reported that he communicated only by written notes and returned her monetary offering.

== Emergence from retreat and public debate ==
He emerged from the retreat on 15 October 2017, with large crowds gathering to receive him; the event attracted national media coverage. His years of unshaven hair and prolonged silence drew public debate. The monk Phra Maha Praiwan Worawanno argued that such practices had no basis in Buddhist doctrine. In an interview given days after his emergence, Khruba Noi said his hair had simply grown uncut in isolation, that he was naturally beardless, and denied claiming any supernatural powers. Days later he shaved his head and, at an alms round, had monetary offerings returned to donors. The independent Buddhist studies scholar Chaturong Chong-asa held that leaving the hair uncut and taking a prolonged vow of silence breached monastic discipline, and the monk Phra Phayom Kalayano called his self-mortification excessive and urged him to follow the Middle Way. His mother, saddened by accusations of deception, responded that her son had wished to enter the monkhood since childhood.

== Teachings ==
Shortly before his death, Khruba Noi spoke on the theme of "real life" (chiwit ching) at the "We bring the temple to 7-Eleven" event (เรายกวัดมาไว้ที่เซเว่นฯ); the daily Khaosod published excerpts from the talk. In it he compared life to the shifting scenes of a stage play, taught that fortune and misfortune follow from one's own kamma rather than from gods or planets, and described existence as an alternation of opposites in which "the future of 'having' is 'losing'". MGR Online reported a collection of 156 handwritten aphorisms spanning 49 pages, including "a life without Māra does not become a great legend" (ชีวิตไม่มีมาร ก็ไม่เป็นตำนานอันยิ่งใหญ่).

== Death ==
Khruba Noi died in the early hours of 31 August 2023 at Wat Tham Chetawan, aged 34. Thai news reports gave the cause as heart failure; according to the business daily Thansettakij, he had a longstanding heart-valve condition and had refused hospital treatment as his health worsened. He had written a testament on 30 May 2023 that directed an austere funeral—no washing or dressing of the body, no autopsy, cremation within a single day, no fundraising and no commercial use of his image—and left the temple's property to the temple itself, under the governance of its abbot, Phra Achan Chalong, and the temple committee; he was cremated the same day as his death.
