= Song Hong (disambiguation) =

Song Hong is the Vietnamese name of the Red River, known in Chinese as the "Hong He".

Song Hong may also refer to:

- Song Hong (Chinese: 宋弘), style name Zhongzi (仲子), a Chinese official during the Eastern Han dynasty
- Song Hong, Uttaradit
