= Hong He (disambiguation) =

Hong He or Honghe (Chinese: t 紅河, s 红河, p Hóng Hé, lit. "Red River") typically refers to the Red River of southern China and northern Vietnam.

It may also refer to:

- Red River, a 2008 Chinese film
- Honghe Hani and Yi Autonomous Prefecture (红河哈尼族彝族自治州, Hónghé Hānízú–Yízú Zìzhìzhōu; Hani: Haoqhoqxeif) in Yunnan, China

== Other places in China ==
- Honghe County (红河县, Hónghéxiàn) within the Honghe Hani & Yi Autonomous Prefecture
- Honghe (红河镇, Hónghézhèn), a town in Changle County, Shandong
- Honghe (红河乡; Hónghéxiāng) a township in Li County, Gansu
- Honghe (红河乡; Hónghéxiāng), a township in Jingchuan County, Gansu

Other places in China romanized as Honghe or Hong He include:

- Honghe (洪合镇, Hónghéxiàn), a town in Jiaxing's Xiuzhou District in Zhejiang, China

== See also ==
- Hongshui River
- Song Hong (disambiguation) for the Vietnamese form of the same name
