= Fak Tha Wittaya School =

- โรงเรียนฟากท่าวิทยา

Location
- 41 Village No 1, Fak Tha Sub-district; Fak Tha District, Uttaradit, 53160; Thailand
- Coordinates: 18.000191°N 100.881864°E

Information
- Type: Government
- Motto: รักความสะอาด มารยามดี มีวินัย ใฝ่ศึกษา กีฬาเยี่ยม เปี่ยมคุณธรรม (Love cleanliness, Good manners, Disciplined, Studious, Great at sports, Full of Virtue)
- Established: 22 May 1974
- School number: 055-489075
- Teaching staff: 39 (2020 academic year)
- Grades: 7–12 (Mathayom 1–6)
- Gender: Coeducational
- Age range: 12–18
- Campus size: 100,800 square meters
- Colour: Purple and Green
- Song: March Fak Tha (Thai: มาร์ชฟากท่า)
- Mascot: Elephant and Candle
- Information: Trees of school is Ficus religiosa
- Website: http://www.ftwschool.ac.th

Fak Tha Wittaya School (F.T.W.; Thai: โรงเรียนฟากท่าวิทยา, Rong Rian Fak Tha Wittaya) is a high school in Fak Tha District, Uttaradit, Thailand.

== History ==
Fak Tha Wittaya School is a medium-sized secondary school located at 41 Moo 1, Fak Tha Subdistrict, Fak Tha District, Uttaradit Province, Thailand, approximately 125 kilometers from the provincial capital. The school was originally established on May 17, 1956, as an upper primary school (Grades 5–7) under the Department of General Education.

Initially located at Wat Mahathat Community School, it was later relocated to Wat Wang Khwan before moving to its current location in 1958. The school received government funding to construct a 108L-type building on a 63-rai campus and began offering lower secondary education (Grades 7–9).

In 1974, the school was upgraded to a full-fledged coeducational secondary school and renamed "Fak Tha Wittaya School" under Ministry of Education order No. S 224/2517. By 1976, it had a complete lower secondary program and, in 1990, expanded to offer upper secondary education (Grades 10–12). That same year, the school received a Royal Award for Outstanding Small Secondary School.

As of 1992, Fak Tha Wittaya School offers a complete secondary education program from Mathayom 1 to Mathayom 6 (Grades 7–12).

== School's emblem ==
- Elephant, representing community relations and a school that collaborates in education.
- Candle, representing glory and success by combining the power of education between communities and school.

== School's colours ==
- Purple
- Green is the exuberance of the tree, as the knowledge grows.

== School's Tree ==
- Bodhi Tree

== List of directors ==
Name	Years active
Sungsak Nakhom	1974 – 1979
Pricha Bunchueatrong	1979 – 1987
Wittaya Raksujja	1987 – 1994
Sompong Phonsungnoen	1994 – 1998
Suthep Titorphol	1999 – 2004
Bunchaow Niramonhansa	2004 – 2006
Thongchai Pinthong	2007 – 2016
Pakapon Seeka	2016 – present
