= Saen To, Nam Pat =

Saen To แสนตอ
- Tambon
- Interactive map of Saen To
- Country: Thailand
- Province: Uttaradit
- District: Nam Pat District

Population (2005)
  - Total: 8,656
- Time zone: UTC+7 (ICT)

Saen To (Thai: แสนตอ, pronounced [sɛ̌ːn tɔ̄ː]) is a village and tambon (sub-district) of Nam Pat District, in Uttaradit Province, Thailand. In 2005 it had a population of 8,656 people. The tambon contains eight villages.
