= Na Noi district =

Na Noi นาน้อย
- District
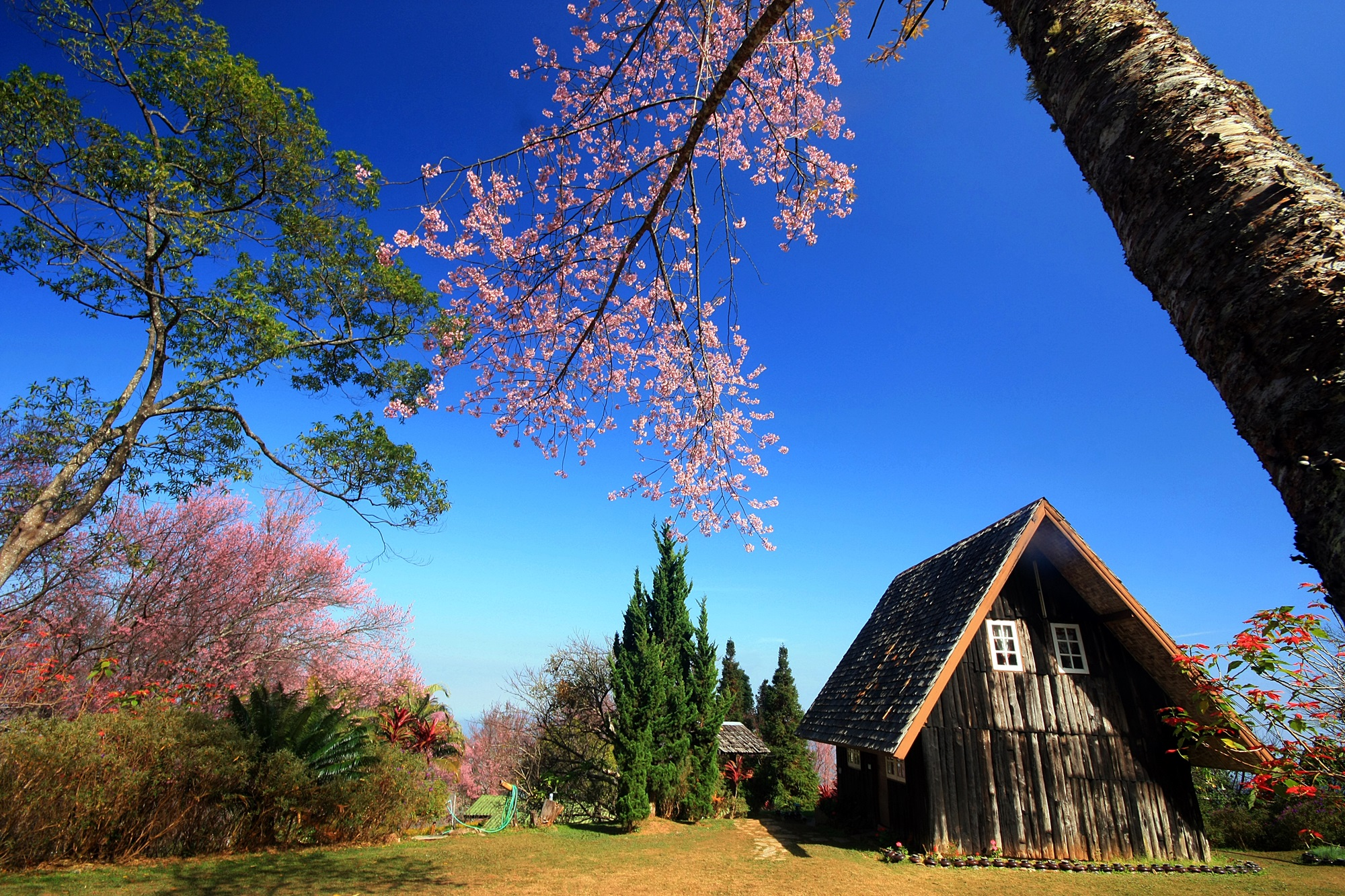
- Prunus cerasoides blossoming at Khun Sathan National Park

- District location in Nan province
- Coordinates: 18°19′30″N 100°42′54″E
- Country: Thailand
- Province: Nan

Government
  - Marshal: Samai Khamchomphu

Area
  - Total: 1,408.122 km^{2} (543.679 sq mi)

Population (2024)
  - Total: 31,681
  - Density: 22.499/km^{2} (58.272/sq mi)
- Time zone: UTC+7 (ICT)
- Postal code: 55150
- Geocode: 5504

Na Noi (Thai: นาน้อย, pronounced [nāː nɔ́ːj]) is a district (amphoe) in Nan province, northern Thailand.

== History ==
Na Noi was originally named Mueang Ngua (เมืองงั่ว) and later changed in the 19th century to Wiang Si Sa Ket (เวียงศรีษะเกษ). In 1899 it became part of Nan Province. Though it was originally planned to merge Sisaket and Tha Pla Subdistrict into one district, in 1903 Tha Pla was merged into Uttaradit Province. In 1917 the name of the district was changed, to avoid confusion with Sisaket province.

== Geography ==
Neighboring districts are, from the north clockwise: Wiang Sa and Ban Khok of Uttaradit province; Na Muen and Rong Kwang of Phrae province. To the east is the Xaignabouli province of Laos.

The main river is the Nan in the eastern part of the district. The Nam Haeng River flows through Na Noi town to dump into the Nan River further east. Upstream of Na Noi town is the Nam Haeng Reservoir.

Also in the west of the district is Si Nan National Park, protecting the forested Phi Pan Nam mountains which separate the valleys of the Nan and the Yom Rivers.

Erosion formed the strange shapes named Hom Chom, found not far north of the town Na Noi. The mounds, some rather sharp, remained when rainwater and brooks cut into the sandstone.

The eastern part of the district is in the Luang Prabang Range mountain area of the Thai highlands.

== Slogan ==
The slogan of the district is "City of earth pillars, area of sweet tamarind, legendary Doi Phachu, praise the chedi Phra That Phlu Chae".

== Administration ==
The district is divided into seven sub-districts (tambons), which are further subdivided into 66 villages (mubans). Na Noi is a township (thesaban tambon) and covers parts of tambon Na Noi. There are a further seven tambon administrative organizations (TAO).

No.	Name	Thai name	Villages	Pop.
1.	Na Noi	นาน้อย	10	5,707
2.	Chiang Khong	เชียงของ	7	2,173
3.	Si Saket	ศรีษะเกษ	14	7,439
4.	Sathan	สถาน	12	5,436
5.	Santha	สันทะ	8	5,723
6.	Bua Yai	บัวใหญ่	8	4,021
7.	Namtok	น้ำตก	7	2,447

== Places of interest ==
Wat Tham Chetawan (Thai: วัดถ้ำเชตวัน), also known as Phutthasathan Tham Chetawan, is a Buddhist temple in Ban Chetawan, Santha subdistrict, developed around a group of caves by the monk Khruba Noi Yanwichai (1989–2023). Listed as a local attraction in the government tourism directory, it was formally registered as a temple by the National Office of Buddhism on 28 February 2023.
