= Wat Soi Thong =

Buddhist temple in Bangkok, Thailand

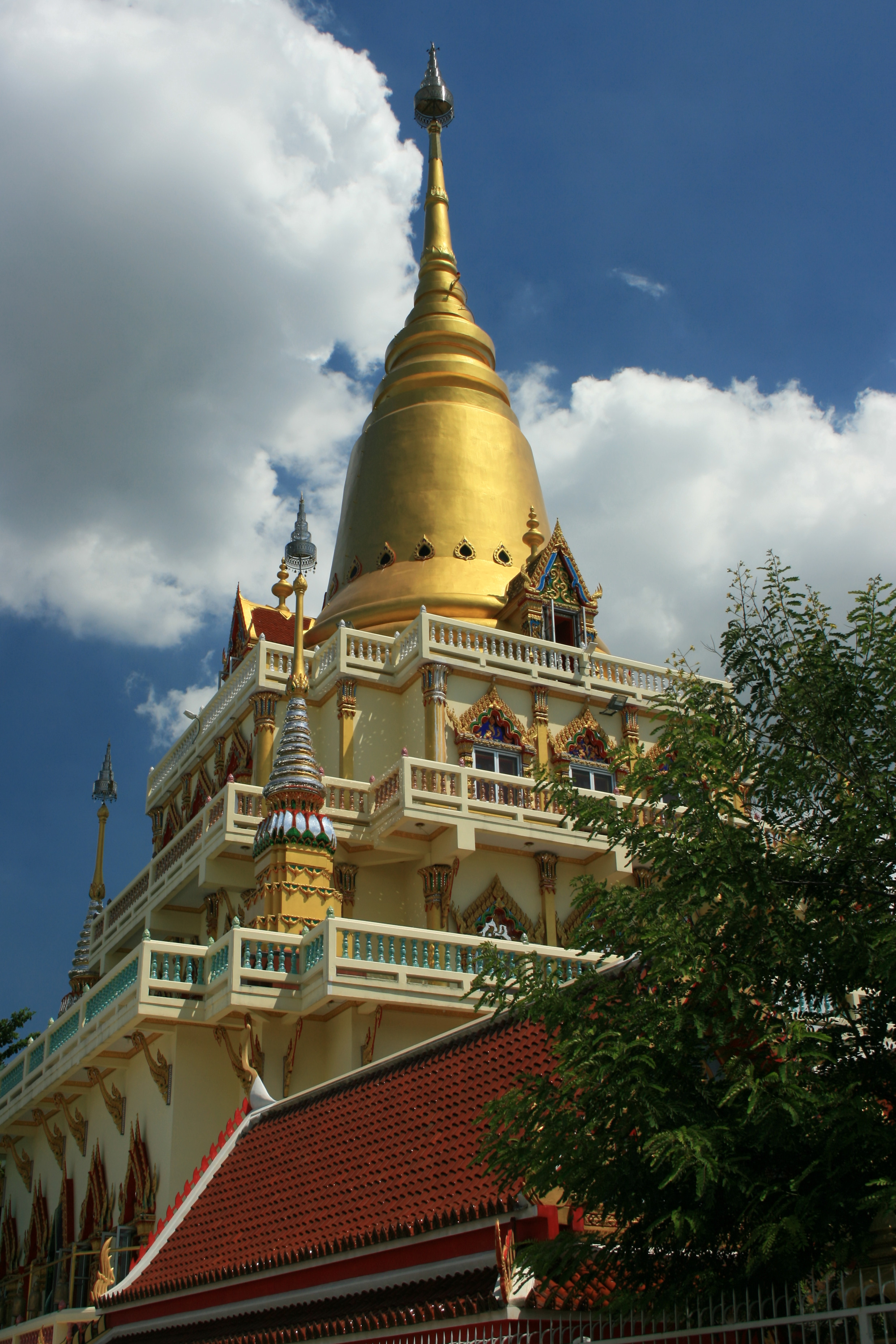

- Location within Bangkok

Religion
- Affiliation: Buddhism
- Sect: Theravāda, Mahā Nikāya
- Status: active

Location
- Location: 1319 Pracharat Sai 1 Rd., Bang Sue, Bang Sue, Bangkok
- Country: Thailand
- Interactive map of Wat Soi Thong
- Coordinates: 13.8128°N 100.5181°E

Architecture
- Completed: 1851 (circa)

Wat Soi Thong (Thai: วัดสร้อยทอง) is a third-classed royal Buddhist temple in Bangkok. The monastery located by Chao Phraya River near Rama VI Bridge, Rama VII Bridge and Yothinburana School. It was built around 1851, assuming that built by the descendants of Chao Phraya Si Phiphat (Phae Bunnag) during King Rama VI's reign.

The principal Buddha image named Luang Pho Luea (หลวงพ่อเหลือ) is cast-brass made of left-over materials from the other Buddha images cast in 1902 with the cooperation of one millionaire and the local people.

Its name "Wat Soi Thong" literally translated as "temple of golden necklace". It is said that this temple was originally called "Wat Son Thong" (temple of hidden gold) according to folklore titled "Legend of Lord Uthong" about the legendary king Lord Uthong (not King Uthong of Ayutthaya), who escape the war (some said escape from cholera) and brought with him a lot of gold and there was a reason to hide these golds here.

Inside the head of principal Buddha image, the relics of the five arhats are contained. In 1941 during World War II, as the temple was located on a strategic site, it was severely damaged by the bombs. However, Luang Pho Luea was unscathed and therefore received the faith from the people since then. The story of this miracle has been told continuously until the present day.

An image of Sīvali is placed at the entrance to the temple to worship.

Within the temple grounds is also home to a Bangkok Local Museum, Bang Sue District. Behind the temple by Chao Phraya River, is also the location of the pier of the Chao Phraya Express Boat that operates from Wat Ratcha Singkhorn in downtown Bangkok to Nonthaburi province, with designated pier number N23. The striking clock tower is also located here.

Since Wat Soi Thong is located by Chao Phraya River in the section it joins with canal Khlong Bang Son, thus causing the river in this area to be abundant with iridescent shark. Visitors can feed them with bread or fish food including being able to release fish for merit making as well.

Two famous former preacher monks Phra Maha Paiwan Warawanno and Phra Maha Somphong Rattanawangso also lived in this temple.
