= Phra Khruba Boonchum =

Thai Buddhist monk

Phra Khuva Boonchum
- Ñāṇasaṁvara
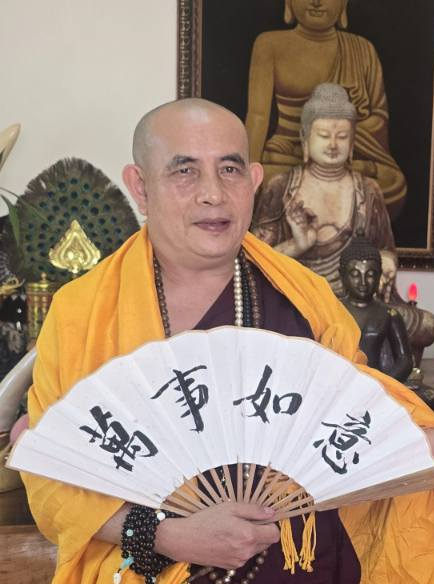
- Title: Khruba

Personal life
- Born: 5 January 1965 (age 61) Mae Kham, Chiang Rai Province, Thailand
- Other name: Ñāṇasaṁvara

Religious life
- Religion: Buddhism
- School: Theravada
- Lineage: Thai Forest Tradition

Senior posting
- Teacher: Khruba Siwichai
- Based in: Wat Phra That Don Ruang
- Students: Khruba Noi Yanwichai

Venerable Ñāṇasaṁvara (Thai: ญาณสํวโร; Burmese: ဉာဏသံဝရ; born 5 January 1964), also known as Khruba Boonchum (ครูบาบุญชุ่ม) in Thailand and as the Mine Hpone Sayadaw (မိုင်းဖုန်းဆရာတော်) in Myanmar, is a prominent Shan Theravāda Buddhist monk of the Northern Thai Forest Tradition established by Khruba Siwichai. He is widely respected in Thailand, Myanmar, and Laos for his solitary meditation retreats in remote forests, mountains, and caves, earning him the nickname "the monk of the three nations".

== Early life ==
Ñāṇasaṁvara was born on 5 January 1964 in Mae Kham, Chiang Rai Province, Thailand, to Po Kham Hla and Nang Saeng La, a Shan-speaking family originally from Mong Yong near Kengtung, Shan State, Burma. His birth name was Sai Wun Sum. His grandparents later migrated to Chiang Saen, Thailand.

== Ordination ==
He first ordained as a novice at the age of 11, receiving the title Shin Nya Tham Wora. He was ordained as a bhikkhu on 29 May 1985 at 09:39 am by senior monks including Sai Nom (Paw Kyit), Daw Nan Sam Saeng, Mong Phone Pandaka U Nang Shwe, and Daw Nan Thit. Burma News International, citing the Shan Herald News Agency, instead dates his higher ordination to 9 May 1986 at Wat Suan Dok in Chiang Mai, at the age of 21. In the third year after his ordination, he built a stupa on the 49th mountain of Khyen Loi Win Kyauk (Khyen Taw Taung) in Wan Lai village. He also travelled to Buddhist sites in Sri Lanka and India.

== Later life ==
Ñāṇasaṁvara serves as the abbot of Wat Phra That Don Ruang in Tachileik, Shan State, Myanmar. He has been invited to royal palaces in Bhutan and Thailand.

Ñāṇasaṁvara is known for his ascetic practice: he is a lifelong vegetarian, walks barefoot in all weather, and observes complete silence during his solitary cave retreats. These retreats have taken place not only in Thailand and Shan State but also in Bhutan.

His followers include senior Burmese officials, military generals, and Shan ethnic armed leaders such as Khin Nyunt and Yawd Serk. Before Khin Nyunt's fall from power, he donated large sums to the Sayadaw. In 2004 the military government accused him of assisting Shan leaders seeking secession from the Union and sought to arrest him, and his monastery in Tachileik was closed; at the request of his followers he remained in Thailand until 2013, when he was permitted to return under President Thein Sein. After the Saffron Revolution, he was named among patrons of the International Sangha Organization led by the exiled Penang Sayadaw.

In 2016, at the invitation of Aung San Suu Kyi, he visited Nay Pyi Taw and also met Senior General Min Aung Hlaing. In 2018, he visited ailing former Senior General Maung Aye.

He gained international media attention during the Tham Luang cave rescue, when he predicted the exact day the trapped boys and their coach would be found alive. The King of Thailand later offered him robes in recognition.

Ñāṇasaṁvara has also mediated peace and reconciliation ceremonies with ethnic minority groups in Myanmar.

== Meditation retreats ==
In 2010, he began a retreat in Rajagriha Cave in Ngao district, Lampang province, Thailand, where visitors were barred and communication was restricted to written messages. It ended on 20 July 2013 after three years, three months, and three days; he then met followers for three days before beginning a further three-month retreat.

From April 2019 to August 2022, he undertook another retreat of the same duration in Mong Kyat Cave, Shan State.

== Health ==
After completing the 2019–2022 retreat, he became seriously ill with cerebral malaria in August 2022. He was treated at Bangkok Hospital at the expense of King Vajiralongkorn, and later recovered.

== Awards ==
- Saddhammajotikadhaja Medal (1996)
- Agga Maha Kammatthana Sariya Degree (2018)
