= Nam Khrai =

Nam Khrai น้ำไคร้
- Tambon
- Country: Thailand
- Province: Uttaradit
- District: Nam Pat District

Population (2005)
  - Total: 6,065
- Time zone: UTC+7 (ICT)

Nam Khrai (Thai: น้ำไคร้, pronounced [náːm kʰráj]) is a village and tambon (sub-district) of Nam Pat District, in Uttaradit Province, Thailand. In 2005 it had a population of 6,065 people. The tambon contains seven villages.
