= Huai Mun =

Village and tambon in Thailand

Huai Mun ห้วยมุ่น
- Tambon
- Country: Thailand
- Province: Uttaradit
- District: Nam Pat District

Population (2005)
  - Total: 2,604
- Time zone: UTC+7 (ICT)

Huai Mun (Thai: ห้วยมุ่น, pronounced [hûa̯j mûn]) is a village and tambon (sub-district) of Nam Pat District, in Uttaradit Province, Thailand. In 2005, it had a population of 2,604 people. The tambon contains eight villages.
