= Praiwan Wannabut =

Thai influencer, writer, and actor

- ไพรวัลย์ วรรณบุตร
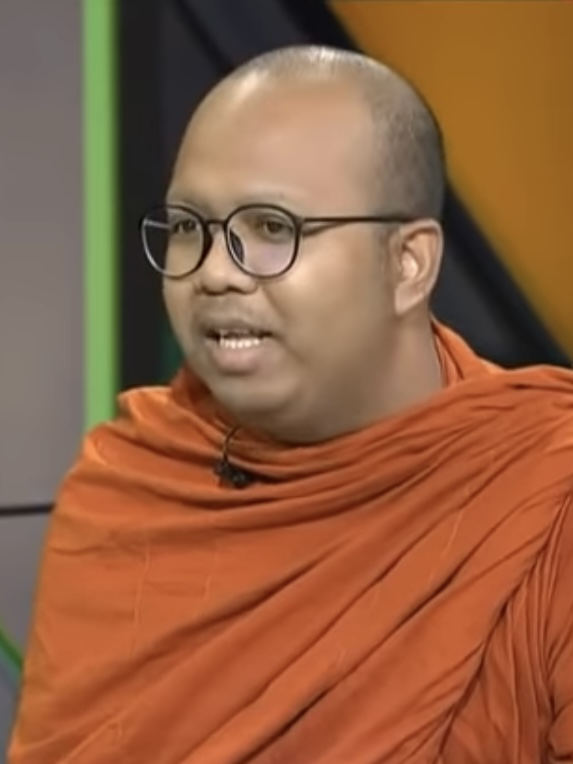
- Paiwan in 2020
- Born: 2 October 1991 (age 34); Tha Mai, Chanthaburi, Thailand
- Other name: Parry (nickname)
- Education: Mahachulalongkornrajavidyalaya University; Ramkhamhaeng University
- Occupations: Influencer; writer; actor

Praiwan Wannabut (Thai: ไพรวัลย์ วรรณบุตร, RTGS: Phraiwan Wannabut; born 2 October 1991), nicknamed Parry (Thai: แพรรี่), is a Thai influencer, writer, and actor. He was formerly a Buddhist monk known as Phra Maha Praiwan Worawanno (Thai: พระมหาไพรวัลย์ วรวณฺโณ).

== Biography ==
=== Life as a Buddhist monk ===
Praiwan was born into a poor family in Tha Mai, Chanthaburi. Upon completing primary school, he entered monastic life so that he could further his study despite his family's financial situation. He was first ordained as a novice in Sukhothai province. By the age of 18, he had attained Level 7 in the study of Pali, the language of the Theravada canon.

He moved to Wat Soi Thong in Bangkok for advanced studies and became the first novice monk from Sukhothai to complete Level 9 in Pali – equivalent to a bachelor's degree. By the time he was 20, he was ordained as a monk under the auspices of King Bhumibol Adulyadej. He graduated with two-second degrees from Mahachulalongkornrajavidyalaya University and Ramkhamhaeng University.

In September of 2021, he was made popular by his appearance on a Facebook Live in a joint appearance with Sompong Nakhonthaisong (Luang Phi Sompong Talbuddhadho). More than 200,000 people watched the livestream. The Facebook Live was unpopular among Thai conservatives, however, as they believed the duo was making a mockery of Buddhism. Fans defended them, arguing the duo wanted to teach about dharma to Thai teenagers in a contemporary fashion.

=== Present life ===
He is no longer a monk, deciding instead to instead pursue a career in entertainment and literature. He also has been an influencer and actor since February 2022. He is openly LGBTQ+.

== Filmography ==
=== Television dramas ===
- 2023 Winyan Patsaya (วิญญาณแพศยา) (/Ch.8) as ()

=== Television series ===
- 20 () (/Ch.) as ()

=== Television sitcoms ===
- 20 () (/Ch.) as ()

=== Films ===
- 20 () () as ()

=== MC ===
Television

- 2023 : เกาข่าวเอามันส์ Every Monday to Friday at 9:40-10:25 a.m. and Saturday to Sunday at 10:10-10:55 a.m. On Air Ch.8 With ต๊ะ-ภัทรพล นิธิวรพล (January 2, 2023-)
- 2023 : ฟาดหัวข่าว Every Saturday from 9:30-10:30 a.m. On Air Amarin TV With Willy McIntosh, Ratchanok Suwannaket (February 4, 2023-)

Online

- 2021 : YouTube:ไพรวัลย์ [Official Channel]
- 2022 : นินทาประเทศไทย On Air YouTube:NANAKE555 (2022)
- 2022 : แย่งซีน EP.1 On Air YouTube:ช่อง8 : Thai Ch8
