= Ban Khok subdistrict =

Ban Khok บ้านโคก
- Tambon
- Interactive map of Ban Khok
- Coordinates: 18.021494°N 101.064798°E
- Country: Thailand
- Province: Uttaradit
- District: Ban Khok District

Population (2005)
  - Total: 3,960
- Time zone: UTC+7 (ICT)

Ban Khok (Thai: บ้านโคก, pronounced [bâːn kʰôːk]) is a village and tambon (sub-district) of Ban Khok District, in Uttaradit Province, Thailand. In 2005 it had a population of 3,960 people. The tambon contains seven villages.
