= Uttaradit Airport =

Abandoned airport in Thailand

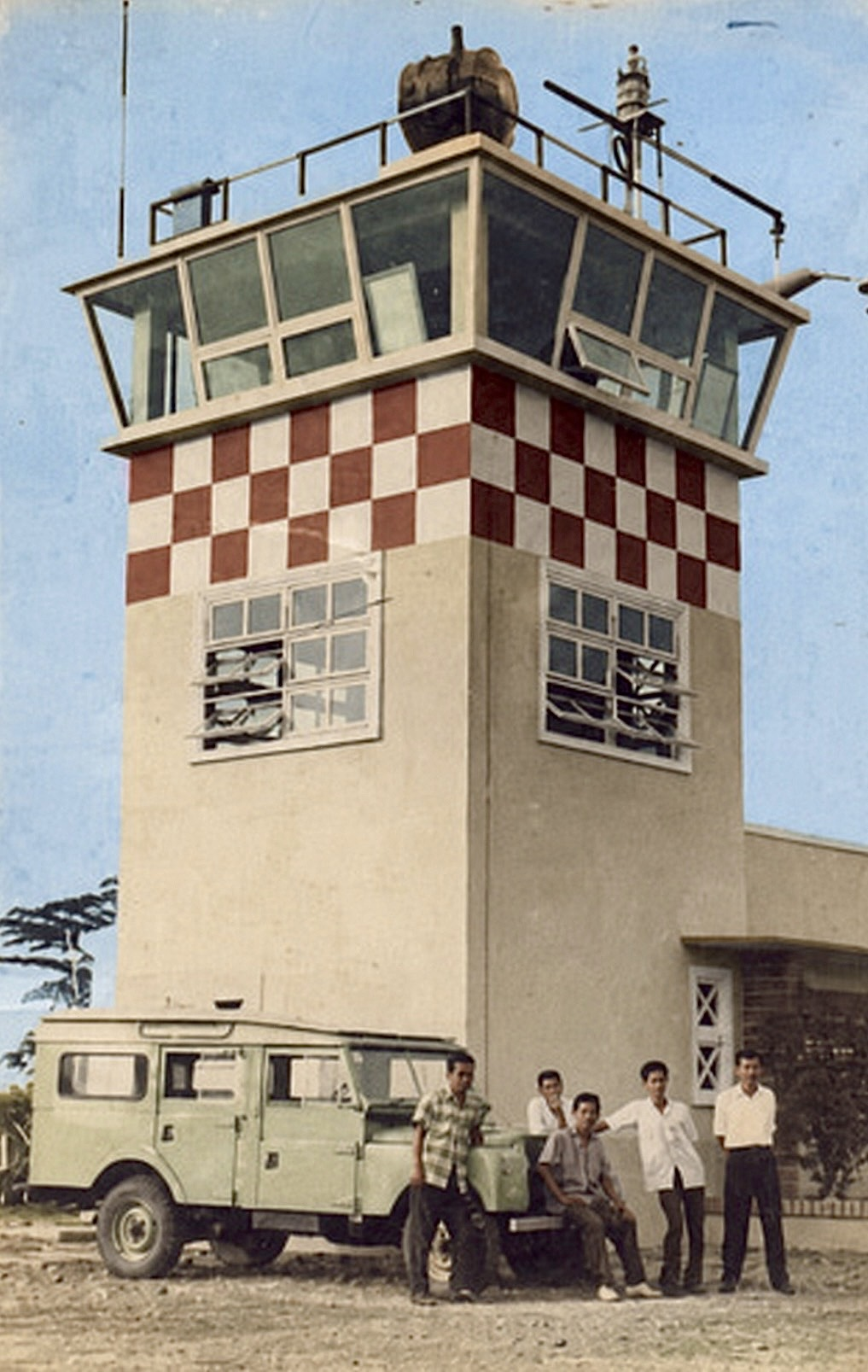
- Air traffic control tower of Uttaradit Airport, taken sometime between 1972 and 1975.
- IATA: UTR; ICAO: VTPU

Summary
- Airport type: Defunct
- Serves: Uttaradit
- Location: Ban Wang Yang, Phajuk Subdistrict, Mueang District, Uttaradit Province
- Opened: 1968
- Closed: 1975
- Passenger services ceased: 1975
- Time zone: UTC+7 (+7)
- Elevation AMSL: 262 ft / 80 m
- Coordinates: 17°40′23″N 100°14′03″E

Map
- Shown within Thailand

Runways
Direction	Length		Surface
Direction	ft	m	Surface
05/23	4,921	1,500	Asphalt

Uttaradit Airport (IATA: UTR, ICAO: VTPU), also known as Wang Yang Airport, is an abandoned airport in Ban Wang Yang, Phajuk Subdistrict, Mueang district in Uttaradit province, Thailand.

== History ==
Originally, the Uttaradit Landing Ground served the Uttaradit province, located at 17°37′52″N 100°05′48″E. On 11 November, 1944, it had two runways, both overgrown and rendered unserviceable for aircraft use.

In 1967, the Department of Civil Aviation begun the construction of Uttaradit Airport to help facilitate the transportation of personnel and materials. These operations helped construction of the Sirikit Dam. Additionally, the airport also facilitated the transportation of Italian engineers and construction supervisors for the Sirikit Dam. The 1968 National Economic and Social Development Plan earmarked the installation of three sets of Single-sideband modulation navigational equipment in Uttaradit and Loei airports.

=== Commercial use ===
Following the completion of the dam in 1972, the airport began offering one round-trip flight per day between Don Mueang and Uttaradit by Thai Airways. The airport was upgraded to accommodate a control tower and passenger terminal. Later, the airport was merged with Thai Airways for commercial services. Uttaradit Airport was equipped with a non-directional beacon. Due to the decline of passenger traffic, the airline experienced money losses. This led to flight services ceasing operations in 1975, with the airport closing. In the mid-1980s, the 33rd Ranger Regiment was stationed there. The old runway was mainly used by automotive technicians for driving training.

== Development proposals ==
On November 25, 2010, major of Phachuk Subdistrict, Somchai Munkhemtong invited the village headman, community leaders, and local residents to gather their opinions regarding the development of Uttaradit Airport. All parties agreed that there was no need to redevelop and reopen the airport. Following the agreements, 700 rai of the total 1,085 rai of land has been transferred for the Royal Initiative Plant Conservation Center under Princess Maha Chakri Sirindhorn's patronage. The land was to be redeveloped into a learning and research center in the field of botany.

In 2014, Governor of Uttardit Province Chatchakeir Kittinapadol along with other officials visited the site of the former airport. Since the airport’s closure in 1975, the 1,600 meter-long runway has remained intact, while the control tower and passenger terminal had deteriorated over time. The Ministry of Transport projected a nationwide air infrastructure development project which was aimed on regional airports. The project included Uttaradit Airport, which was to be developed and restored for commercial use. It was planned to operate 40-50 seat aircraft and serve the 400,000 residents of the province. It was projected to begin in 2015, however, it has since been discontinued.

In 2018, Tak Aviation Company Limited proposed a plan to redevelop the former airport for commercial aviation. However, legal and land-use issues hindered the continuation of the plan.

In August 2019, a group of private investors in Uttaradit aimed to convert the abandoned airport into a car and motorcycle racing track, modeled after the Buriram International Circuit. An initial survey determined that the land was flat and suitable for a racing course, and a grandstand was also proposed. The group had a budget of over 10 million baht, and was awaiting approval from The Treasury Department, provincial authorities, and local government. If it was approved, construction could have begun in hopes of boosting tourism and local economy.

In 2019, the Uttaradit Chamber of Commerce (UCC) prepared to move forward with the development of the old airport, provided that a private aviation company has a clear investment plan. On November 22, Secretary of the UCC Phitsanu Lapchaijaroenkij, stated that the governor Thanakorn Uengchitpaisan had invited local business from the district of Uttaradit to meet with representatives from the aviation company. The company’s proposal was to improve and develop the old airport, which was now a part of a public utility are known as Nong Puen Taek. The proposal of the new airport would include an apron for chartered flights or aircraft rentals for other airlines. The plan was expected create local employment opportunities, and the UCC viewed this as a major benefit for the community. However, the discussion was informal and no official investment plan had been made.
