= Ban Khok district =

Ban Khok บ้านโคก
- District
- District location in Uttaradit province
- Coordinates: 18°1′30″N 101°4′12″E
- Country: Thailand
- Province: Uttaradit
- Seat: Ban Khok
- District established: 1977

Area
  - Total: 1,055.911 km^{2} (407.690 sq mi)

Population (2008)
  - Total: 14,395
  - Density: 13.5/km^{2} (35/sq mi)
- Time zone: UTC+7 (ICT)
- Postal code: 53180
- Geocode: 5306

Ban Khok (Thai: บ้านโคก, pronounced [bâːn kʰôːk]) is the northeasternmost district (amphoe) of Uttaradit province, northern Thailand.

== History ==
The minor district (king amphoe) Ban Khok was established on 1 July 1977, when the two tambon Ban Khok and Muang Chet Ton were split off from Fak Tha district. Sub-districts Na Khum and Bo Bia were created in 1986. On 12 August 1987 it was upgraded to a full district.

In 1984 a boundary dispute with neighboring Laos over the exact location of the watershed between the Mekong and the Nan Rivers led to an armed dispute between the two countries. The disputed area of 19 km^{2}, covering three villages and about 1000 inhabitants, was finally given to Laos.

== Geography ==
Neighboring districts are (from the south clockwise) Nam Pat and Fak Tha of Uttaradit Province, Na Muen and Na Noi of Nan province. To the east is the Xaignabouli province of Laos.

The main river of the district is the Pat River, a tributary of the Nan River.

The district is in the Luang Prabang Range mountain area of the Thai highlands.

== Administration ==
The district is divided into four sub-districts (tambon), which are further subdivided into 28 villages (muban). Ban Khok is a sub-district municipality (thesaban tambon) which covers the whole of tambon Ban Khok. There are a further three tambon administrative organizations (TAO).

No.	Name	Thai	Villages	Pop.
1.	Muang Chet Ton	ม่วงเจ็ดต้น	7	3,623
2.	Ban Khok	บ้านโคก	7	3,960
3.	Na Khum	นาขุม	7	3,330
4.	Bo Bia	บ่อเบี้ย	7	3,482
