= Bo Bia =

Bo Bia บ่อเบี้ย
- Tambon
- Country: Thailand
- Province: Uttaradit
- District: Ban Khok District

Population (2005)
  - Total: 3,482
- Time zone: UTC+7 (ICT)

Bo Bia (Thai: บ่อเบี้ย, pronounced [bɔ̀ː bîa̯]) is a village and tambon (sub-district) of Ban Khok District, in Uttaradit Province, Thailand. In 2005, it had a population of 3,482 people. The tambon contains seven villages.
