= Tha Faek =

Coordinates: 17°56′44″N 100°37′53″E

Tha Faek ท่าแฝก
- Tambon
- Interactive map of Tha Faek
- Country: Thailand
- Province: Uttaradit
- District: Nam Pat District

Area
  - Total: 315 km^{2} (122 sq mi)

Population (2014)
  - Total: 4,434
- Time zone: UTC+7 (ICT)
- Postal code: 53110
- TIS 1099: 530407

Tha Faek (Thai: ท่าแฝก, pronounced [tʰâː fɛ̀ːk]) is a tambon (sub-district) of Nam Pat District, in Uttaradit Province, Thailand. In 2014 it had a population of 4,434 people.

== History ==
The sub-district originally was part of Tha Pla District. With the creation of the Sirikit Dam in 1972, the sub-district has become separated from the central part of Tha Pla District. Effective 14 February 2015, the sub-district was reassigned to Nam Pat District to make the authorities easier to reach for the local residents.

== Administration ==
The sub-district is divided into nine administrative villages.

No.	Name	Thai
1.	Ban Ngom Tham	บ้านงอมถ้ำ
2.	Ban Ngom Mot	บ้านงอมมด
3.	Ban Ngom Sak	บ้านงอมสัก
4.	Ban Huai Phueng	บ้านห้วยผึ้ง
5.	Ban Pa Kang	บ้านป่ากั้ง
6.	Ban Ten Yao	บ้านเด่นยาว
7.	Ban Wang Nam Ton	บ้านวังน้ำต้น
8.	Ban Huai Phai	บ้านห้วยไผ่
9.	Ban Pha Phueng Noi	บ้านผาผึ้งน้อย

The entire sub-district is covered by the Tha Faek sub-district administrative organization (องค์การบริหารส่วนตำบลท่าแฝก) as the local government unit, established in 1997.
