= Honghe, Jingchuan =

Honghe 红河乡
- Township
- Interactive map of Honghe
- Coordinates: 35°26′45″N 107°29′22″E
- Country: China
- Province: Gansu
- Prefecture-level city: Pingliang
- County: Jingchuan

Area
  - Total: 48 km^{2} (19 sq mi)

Population (1998)
  - Total: 8,330

Honghe is a township of Jingchuan County, Gansu, China.
