= Ban Fai =

Ban Fai บ้านฝาย
- Tambon
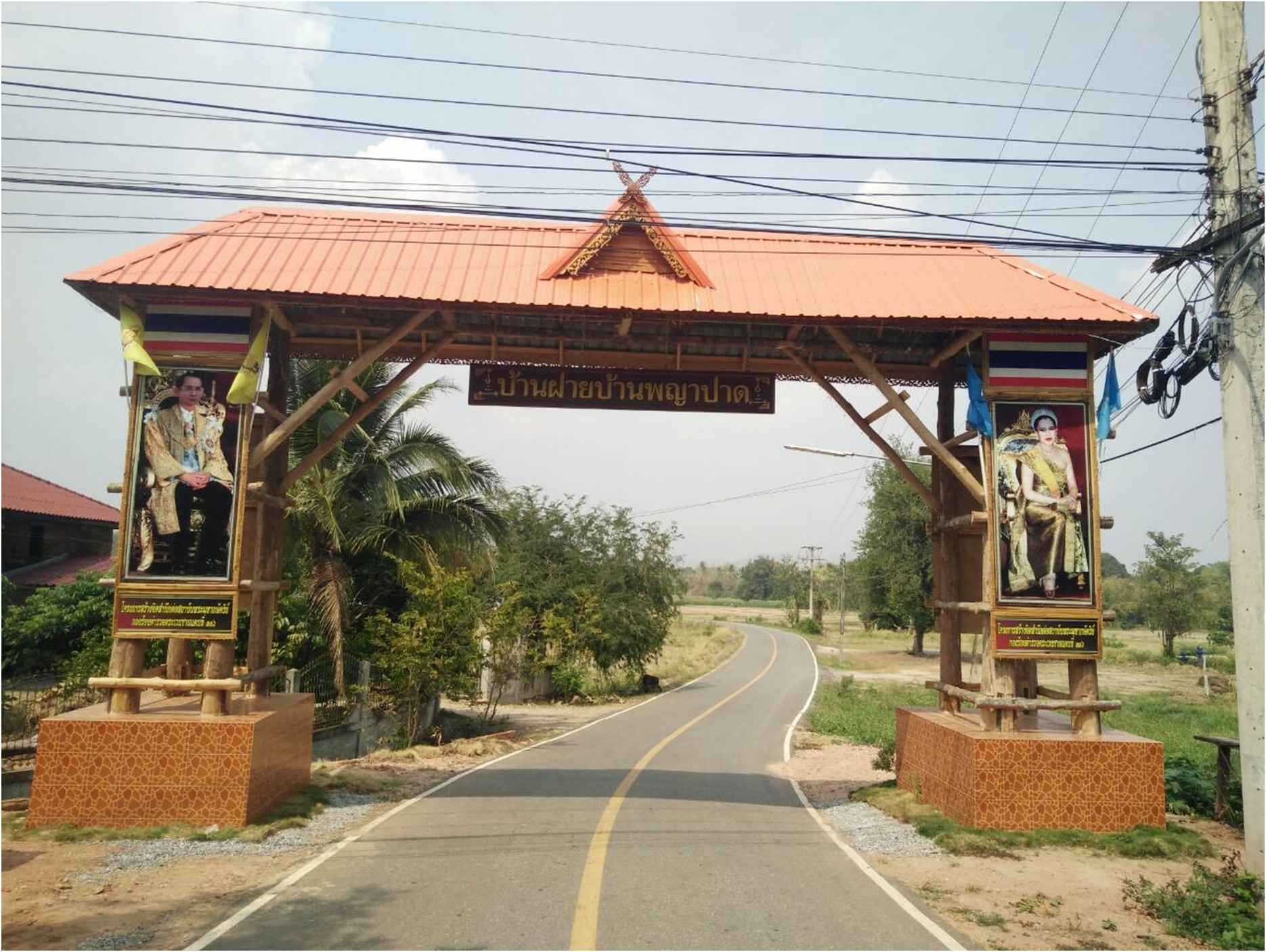
- Gateway over entry road to Ban Fai
- Interactive map of Ban Fai
- Coordinates: 17.769741°N 100.725102°E
- Country: Thailand
- Province: Uttaradit
- District: Nam Pat District

Population (2005)
  - Total: 7,458
- Time zone: UTC+7 (ICT)

Ban Fai (Thai: บ้านฝาย, pronounced [bâːn fǎːj]) is a village and tambon (sub-district) of Nam Pat District, in Uttaradit Province, Thailand. In 2005, it had a population of 7,458 people. The tambon contains eight villages.
