= Na Khum =

Na Khum นาขุม
- Tambon
- Country: Thailand
- Province: Uttaradit
- District: Ban Khok District

Population (2005)
  - Total: 3,330
- Time zone: UTC+7 (ICT)

Na Khum (Thai: นาขุม, pronounced [nāː kʰǔm]) is a village and tambon (sub-district) of Ban Khok District, in Uttaradit Province, Thailand. In 2005 it had a population of 3,330 people. The tambon contains seven villages.
