= Nam Phai =

Nam Phai น้ำไผ่
- Tambon
- Interactive map of Nam Phai
- Country: Thailand
- Province: Uttaradit
- District: Nam Pat District

Population (2005)
  - Total: 3,878
- Time zone: UTC+7 (ICT)

Nam Phai (Thai: น้ำไผ่, pronounced [náːm pʰàj]) is a village and tambon (sub-district) of Nam Pat District, in Uttaradit Province, Thailand. In 2005 it had a population of 3,878 people. The tambon contains eight villages.
