= Uttaradit =

Uttaradit อุตรดิตถ์ ᩏᨲ᩠ᨲᩁᨯᩥᨲ᩠ᨳ᩺
- Provincial Capital City
- เมืองอุตรดิตถ์ ᨾᩮᩬᩥᨦᩏᨲ᩠ᨲᩁᨯᩥᨲ᩠ᨳ᩺
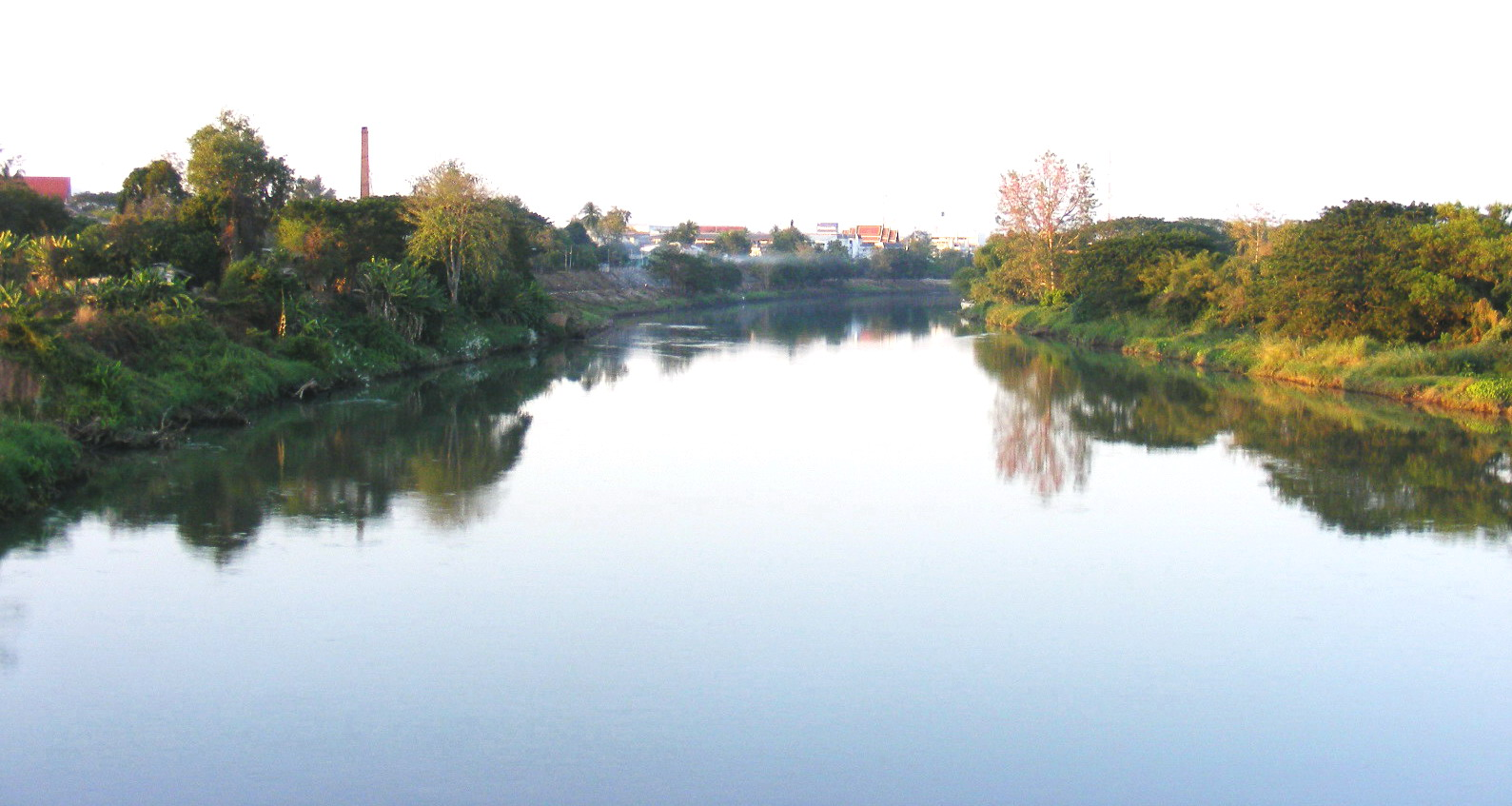
- Nan River in Uttraradit

- Location within Thailand
- Coordinates: 17°37′23″N 100°5′45″E
- Country: Thailand
- Province: Uttaradit Province

Area
  - Land: 13.49 km^{2} (5.21 sq mi)
  - Metro: 766 km^{2} (296 sq mi)
- Elevation: 64 m (210 ft)

Population (2017)
  - Provincial Capital City: 33,357
  - Density: 2,473/km^{2} (6,404/sq mi)
- Time zone: UTC+7 (ICT)

Uttaradit is a town (thesaban mueang) in north Thailand. The original name of Mueang district, Uttaradit, was Bang Pho. This district was under the control of Phi Chai District. Later, it was established as Uttaradit Province and Bang Pho District became the capital district. It was changed to Mueang Uttaradit District recently. The district is the seat of government and the center of economic activity of Uttaradit Province. Uttaradit is 483 km north of Bangkok.

Uttaradit
- "Uttaradit" in Thai language (top) and Northern Thai with Tai Tham script (bottom)

Thai name
- Thai: อุตรดิตถ์
- RTGS: Uttaradit

Northern Thai name
- Northern Thai: ᩏᨲ᩠ᨲᩁᨯᩥᨲ᩠ᨳ᩺ (Uttaradit)

Chinese name
- Chinese: 程逸 (pinyin: Chéng yì)

== Geography ==
The district is surrounded by the following districts:

- North – Den Chai District (Phrae Province) and Tha Pla District.
- East – Tha Pla and Thong Saen Khan Districts.
- South – Thong Saen Khan and Tron Districts.
- West – Laplae District.

== History ==
In the past, Mueang District was called Bang Pho Tah It. It grew rapidly due to its harbor. King Rama V ordered the capital moved from Phi Chai District to Muang District. Next, in the reign of King Rama VI, the king ordered the incorporation of Mueang District into Uttaradit Province.

Throughout its history, many fires have occurred in the center of Uttaradit. In 1932 and 1965, there were fires that occurred at Bang Pho Market and Wat Tha Thanon, both of which were located adjacent to each other. As a result, houses and commercial buildings, both built of wood and concrete were destroyed by the fire. From 1968 until 1975, the province was served by the Uttaradit Airport, which serviced a one round-trip flight per day between Don Mueang and Uttaradit by Thai Airways.

In 1983, a second major fire had started in a two-storey commercial building with wooden row housing. Villagers from the houses hurriedly removed their belongings from the building. The fire later spread around Wat Tha Than, especially near the clock tower located in front of the Uttaradit Railway Station. Most of the wooden row houses in the town were engulfed by flames, and eventually the fire subsided when it was controlled by responding fire trucks. Fortunately, Wat Luang Por Phet remained undamaged from the fire, whicn brought a great surprise to the people of Uttaradit. According to locals, the fire was so big, that the smoke could be seen from 13 kilometers away. The fire trucks that fought the blaze are still used to this day.

== Climate ==
Uttaradit used to hold the record for the highest temperature ever recorded in Thailand: 44.5 °C (112.1 °F) observed at Uttaradit on 27 April 1960. This was broken when temperatures in Mae Hong Son reached 44.6 °C (112.3 °F) on 28 April 2016.

Uttaradit has a tropical savanna climate (Köppen climate classification Aw). Winters are dry and very warm. Temperatures rise until April, which is very hot with an average daily maximum of 38.2 °C (100.8 °F). The monsoon season runs from May through October, with heavy rain and somewhat cooler temperatures during the day, although nights remain warm.

Climate data for Uttaradit (1991–2020, extremes 1951-present)
| Month | Jan | Feb | Mar | Apr | May | Jun | Jul | Aug | Sep | Oct | Nov | Dec | Year |
|---|---|---|---|---|---|---|---|---|---|---|---|---|---|
| Record high °C (°F) | 37.1 (98.8) | 39.3 (102.7) | 42.7 (108.9) | 44.5 (112.1) | 43.7 (110.7) | 41.6 (106.9) | 38.0 (100.4) | 39.5 (103.1) | 37.4 (99.3) | 36.8 (98.2) | 37.3 (99.1) | 36.6 (97.9) | 44.5 (112.1) |
| Mean daily maximum °C (°F) | 32.3 (90.1) | 34.4 (93.9) | 36.4 (97.5) | 37.8 (100.0) | 36.4 (97.5) | 34.7 (94.5) | 33.6 (92.5) | 33.0 (91.4) | 33.6 (92.5) | 33.7 (92.7) | 33.1 (91.6) | 31.6 (88.9) | 34.2 (93.6) |
| Daily mean °C (°F) | 24.4 (75.9) | 26.2 (79.2) | 28.8 (83.8) | 30.8 (87.4) | 30.1 (86.2) | 29.2 (84.6) | 28.5 (83.3) | 28.0 (82.4) | 28.2 (82.8) | 27.9 (82.2) | 26.4 (79.5) | 24.4 (75.9) | 27.7 (81.9) |
| Mean daily minimum °C (°F) | 18.5 (65.3) | 19.8 (67.6) | 22.7 (72.9) | 25.2 (77.4) | 25.5 (77.9) | 25.4 (77.7) | 25.1 (77.2) | 24.8 (76.6) | 24.7 (76.5) | 23.8 (74.8) | 21.6 (70.9) | 19.1 (66.4) | 23.0 (73.4) |
| Record low °C (°F) | 4.5 (40.1) | 10.0 (50.0) | 13.7 (56.7) | 18.0 (64.4) | 20.0 (68.0) | 22.4 (72.3) | 21.4 (70.5) | 21.8 (71.2) | 20.6 (69.1) | 16.3 (61.3) | 10.2 (50.4) | 7.5 (45.5) | 4.5 (40.1) |
| Average precipitation mm (inches) | 9.8 (0.39) | 10.9 (0.43) | 29.4 (1.16) | 71.5 (2.81) | 207.6 (8.17) | 198.7 (7.82) | 181.0 (7.13) | 289.4 (11.39) | 246.6 (9.71) | 102.5 (4.04) | 19.3 (0.76) | 7.5 (0.30) | 1,374.2 (54.10) |
| Average precipitation days (≥ 1.0 mm) | 1.3 | 0.7 | 2.4 | 4.5 | 11.0 | 12.4 | 14.2 | 16.7 | 14.4 | 6.9 | 1.9 | 0.8 | 87.2 |
| Average relative humidity (%) | 67.5 | 63.7 | 62.7 | 63.2 | 71.4 | 76.8 | 79.2 | 82.3 | 81.8 | 78.2 | 72.6 | 68.5 | 72.3 |
| Mean monthly sunshine hours | 291.4 | 274.0 | 313.1 | 243.0 | 198.4 | 117.0 | 120.9 | 117.8 | 144.0 | 198.4 | 252.0 | 257.3 | 2,527.3 |
| Mean daily sunshine hours | 9.4 | 9.7 | 10.1 | 8.1 | 6.4 | 3.9 | 3.9 | 3.8 | 4.8 | 6.4 | 8.4 | 8.3 | 6.9 |
Source 1: World Meteorological Organization
Source 2: Office of Water Management and Hydrology, Royal Irrigation Department (sun 1981–2010)(extremes)

== Transport ==
Uttaradit is served by a station on the State Railway of Thailand. The nearest airport is at Phitsanulok.

== Notable people ==
- Narong Prangcharoen (b. 1973), composer
