= Nam Pat district =

Nam Pat น้ำปาด
- District
- District location in Uttaradit province
- Coordinates: 17°43′42″N 100°41′4″E
- Country: Thailand
- Province: Uttaradit
- Seat: Saen To
- Tambon: 7
- Muban: 58

Area
  - Total: 1,448.711 km^{2} (559.350 sq mi)

Population (2014)
  - Total: 36,950
  - Density: 22.8/km^{2} (59/sq mi)
- Time zone: UTC+7 (ICT)
- Postal code: 53150
- Geocode: 5304

Nam Pat (Thai: น้ำปาด, pronounced [náːm pàːt]) is a district (amphoe) of Uttaradit province, northern Thailand.

== Geography ==
Neighboring districts are (from the south clockwise) Chat Trakan of Phitsanulok province and Thong Saen Khan, Tha Pla, and Fak Tha of Uttaradit Province. To the east is Xaignabouli of Laos.

The main river of the district is the Pat River.

== History ==
Originally named Saen To as the main tambon, it was renamed Nam Pat in 1932.

Nam Pat Wildlife Sanctuary was established in 2001.

== Administration ==
=== Central administration ===
Nam Pat is divided into seven sub-districts (tambon), which are further subdivided into 58 administrative villages (Muban).

No.	Name	Thai	Villages	Pop.
1.	Saen To	แสนตอ	9	8,417
2.	Ban Fai	บ้านฝาย	9	7,023
3.	Den Lek	เด่นเหล็ก	6	4,228
4.	Nam Khrai	น้ำไคร้	9	5,964
5.	Nam Phai	น้ำไผ่	8	3,989
6.	Huai Mun	ห้วยมุ่น	8	2,895
7.	Tha Faek	ท่าแฝก	9	4,434

=== Local administration ===
There is one sub-district municipality (thesaban tambon) in the district:

- Nam Pat (Thai: เทศบาลตำบลน้ำปาด) consisting of parts of sub-district Saen To.

There are seven sub-district administrative organizations (SAO) in the district:

- Saen To (Thai: องค์การบริหารส่วนตำบลแสนตอ) consisting of parts of sub-district Saen To.
- Ban Fai (Thai: องค์การบริหารส่วนตำบลบ้านฝาย) consisting of sub-district Ban Fai.
- Den Lek (Thai: องค์การบริหารส่วนตำบลเด่นเหล็ก) consisting of sub-district Den Lek.
- Nam Khrai (Thai: องค์การบริหารส่วนตำบลน้ำไคร้) consisting of sub-district Nam Khrai.
- Nam Phai (Thai: องค์การบริหารส่วนตำบลน้ำไผ่) consisting of sub-district Nam Phai.
- Huai Mun (Thai: องค์การบริหารส่วนตำบลห้วยมุ่น) consisting of sub-district Huai Mun.
- Tha Faek (Thai: องค์การบริหารส่วนตำบลท่าแฝก) consisting of sub-district Tha Faek.
