= Fak Tha subdistrict =

Coordinates: 18°00′N 100°53′E

Fak Tha ฟากท่า
- Tambon
- Interactive map of Fak Tha
- Country: Thailand
- Province: Uttaradit
- District: Fak Tha District

Population (2005)
  - Total: 5,190
- Time zone: UTC+7 (ICT)

Fak Tha (Thai: ฟากท่า, pronounced [fâːk tʰâː]) is a village and tambon (sub-district) of Fak Tha District, in Uttaradit Province, Thailand. In 2005, it had a population of 5,190 people. The tambon contains 11 villages.
