= Fak Tha district =

Fak Tha ฟากท่า
- District
- District location in Uttaradit province
- Coordinates: 17°59′32″N 100°52′43″E
- Country: Thailand
- Province: Uttaradit
- Seat: Fak Tha
- District established: 1937

Area
  - Total: 632.689 km^{2} (244.283 sq mi)

Population (2008)
  - Total: 15,128
  - Density: 24.2/km^{2} (63/sq mi)
- Time zone: UTC+7 (ICT)
- Postal code: 53160
- Geocode: 5305

Fak Tha (Thai: ฟากท่า, pronounced [fâːk tʰâː]) is a district (amphoe) of Uttaradit province, northern Thailand.

== History ==
The minor district (king amphoe) Fak Tha was established in 1937 as a subordinate of Nam Pat district. On 22 July 1958 it was upgraded to a full district.

== Geography ==
Neighboring districts are (from the east clockwise) Ban Khok and Nam Pat of Uttaradit Province, and Na Muen of Nan province.

The main river of the district is the Pat River, a tributary of the Nan River.

== Administration ==
The district is divided into four sub-districts (tambon), which are further subdivided into 33 villages (muban). Fak Tha is a sub-district municipality (thesaban tambon) which covers parts of tambon Fak Tha and Long Don. There are a further four tambon administrative organizations (TAO).

| No. | Name | Thai | Villages | Pop. |
|---|---|---|---|---|
| 1. | Fak Tha | ฟากท่า | 11 | 5,190 |
| 2. | Song Khon | สองคอน | 11 | 3,379 |
| 3. | Ban Siao | บ้านเสี้ยว | 6 | 3,392 |
| 4. | Song Hong | สองห้อง | 5 | 3,167 |

== Places ==
=== Education ===
- Fak Tha Wittaya School
- Anu Ban Fak Tha School
- Rattanaprasitwit Industrall

=== Temples ===
- Wat Ban Doen
- Wat Ban Huai Luek
- Wat Ban Lum
- Wat Fak Na
- Wat Huai Sai
- Wat Huai Sun
- Wat Hua Thung
- Wat Kok Tong
- Wat Na Nam
- Wat Na Rai Diao
- Wat Nong Hua Na
- Wat Pho Chai
- Wat Pho Du
- Wat Pho Tia
- Wat Phon That
- Wat Sam Bon
- Wat Wang Kong
- Wat Wang-o

=== Hospital ===
- Fak Tha Hospital
