= Nam Pat =

Watercourse in Thailand

- Native name: น้ำปาด

Physical characteristics
- Mouth: Nan River

Basin features
- River system: Chao Phraya River

The Nam Pat (Thai: น้ำปาด, pronounced [náːm pàːt]) is a watercourse in Thailand, part of the Chao Phraya River basin. It is a tributary of the Nan River, joining it in Uttaradit Province.
