= Ban Siao =

- Tambon
- Country: Thailand
- Province: Uttaradit
- District: Fak Tha District

Population (2005)
  - Total: 3,392
- Time zone: UTC+7 (ICT)

Ban Siao (Thai: บ้านเสี้ยว, pronounced [bâːn sîa̯w]) is a village and tambon (sub-district) of Fak Tha District, in Uttaradit Province, Thailand. In 2005 it had a population of 3,392 people. The tambon contains six villages.
