= Song Khon =

- Tambon
- Country: Thailand
- Province: Uttaradit
- District: Fak Tha District

Population (2005)
  - Total: 3,379
- Time zone: UTC+7 (ICT)

Song Khon (Thai: สองคอน, pronounced [sɔ̌ːŋ kʰɔ̄ːn]) is a village and tambon (sub-district) of Fak Tha District, in Uttaradit Province, Thailand. In 2005 it had a population of 3,379 people. The tambon contains 11 villages.
