= Muang Chet Ton =

Muang Chet Ton ม่วงเจ็ดต้น
- Tambon
- Country: Thailand
- Province: Uttaradit
- District: Ban Khok District

Population (2005)
  - Total: 3,623
- Time zone: UTC+7 (ICT)

Muang Chet Ton (Thai: ม่วงเจ็ดต้น, pronounced [mûa̯ŋ t͡ɕèt tôn]) is a village and tambon (sub-district) of Ban Khok District, in Uttaradit Province, Thailand. In 2005 it had a population of 3,623 people. The tambon contains seven villages.
