= Den Lek =

Den Lek เด่นเหล็ก
- Tambon
- Country: Thailand
- Province: Uttaradit
- District: Nam Pat District

Population (2005)
  - Total: 4,376
- Time zone: UTC+7 (ICT)

Den Lek (Thai: เด่นเหล็ก, pronounced [dèn lèk]) is a village and tambon (sub-district) of Nam Pat District, in Uttaradit Province, Thailand. In 2005, it had a population of 4,376 people. The tambon contains six villages.
