= Khruba =

Monastic title in Northern Thailand

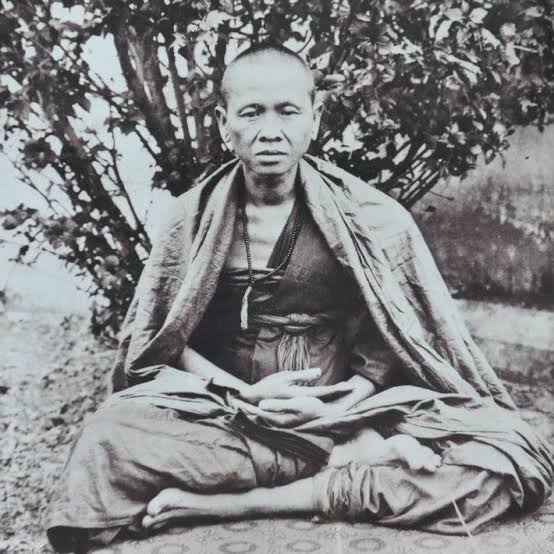
Khruba Siwichai, “the merit source of Lan Na", is one of the most famous khrubas.

Khruba (Northern Thai: ᩕᨣᩪᨷᩤ; Thai: ครูบา) is a traditional honorific title for Buddhist monks. It is bestowed upon highly respected monks who are deeply respected for their spiritual discipline, moral integrity, and service to their communities. The use of the title is often associated with the tradition of 'holy men' (Ton Bun, lit. 'source of merit') that is common in Tai peoples of Northern Thailand, Northern Laos, Sipsongpanna, and Northeastern Myanmar, which shares Theravada Buddhism with Lan Na.

== Etymology ==
The name Khruba comes from 2 words: Guru and Upajjhaya (lit. 'Preceptor'). It refers to a monk who knows both Buddhist doctrine (pariyatti) and Buddhist practice (patipatti), serving as a teacher and spiritual mentor as well as a preceptor to monks and novices.

While some sources suggest that the title may also connect to the Vajrayana phrase "Namo Gurubhya" (lit. 'homage to the teacher'), hinting at a deeper linguistic and spiritual link.

== Origin and significance ==
The title Khruba has its roots in the religious culture of Lan Na, where it was bestowed upon monks who occupied positions of exceptional moral and spiritual authority within local society. More than a simple honorific, the title reflected a broader Northern Thai conception of sacred leadership grounded in Buddhist merit (bun) and religious charisma. As Cohen (2001) observes, the Tai Yuan Buddhist tradition often blurred the boundaries between the ideals of the Bodhisattva, the dhammarāja (righteous ruler), and the Chakravarti (universal monarch), creating a model of authority that linked religious virtue with political legitimacy. Within this worldview, highly revered monks and righteous rulers alike could be regarded as embodiments of accumulated merit and moral power, reflecting the close relationship between kingship and Buddhism in the historical Lan Na polity.

The khruba tradition in modern Northern Thailand is involved in the preservation and revitalisation of regional Buddhist identity in the face of state centralisation and cultural change. Cohen (2001) argues that figures such as Khruba Siwichai and Khruba Apichai Khao Pi should not be understood primarily as millenarian rebels but rather as leaders of a Buddhist revivalist movement rooted in the Tai Yuan religious tradition. Through temple restoration, monument construction, merit-making activities, and moral instruction, these holy men sought to renew Buddhism and uphold a vision of society governed by Buddhist virtue. Their influence extended beyond the boundaries of the modern nation-state, helping to maintain religious and cultural continuity across the wider Tai world. In this sense, the khruba tradition functioned not only as a form of spiritual leadership but also as an important institution through which Lan Na religious heritage, local identities, and transregional Buddhist networks were preserved and transmitted into the modern era.

The title reflects a special relationship between monks and laypeople in Lanna society. A Kruba is not only a teacher but also a symbol of merit, service, and mystical authority. Unlike Phra Ajarn (teacher) or Luang Phor (venerable father), the word Khruba carries a stronger sense of saint-like reverence.

One of the most celebrated figures is Kruba Siwichai (1878–1938), revered as “the merit source of Lan Na". He became famous for restoring temples and leading public works, most notably the road to Wat Phra That Doi Suthep, built almost entirely through local volunteer labour and faith-based donations. Other important Krubas include Khruba Duangdee Subhadho, a disciple of Kruba Siwichai, who continued his mentor's legacy by building temples, schools, chedis, and bridges in Chiang Mai’s San Pa Tong district.

== Association with Esoteric Theravāda ==
Many Krubas are associated with the boran (esoteric) Theravāda tradition. This strand of Buddhism emphasises meditation, ritual, and mystical practices, drawing parallels with Vajrayāna lineages.

== Contemporary usage and controversy ==
During the 1990s, an important religious phenomenon emerged in Northern Thailand. The rise of what has been termed the “new Khruba movement” (ครูบาคติใหม่). Often mockingly referred to as “gas-ripened Khrubas” (ครูบาอุ๊กแก๊ส; Compared to fruit that has been ripened prematurely).

This phenomenon became particularly visible as a number of Northern Thai monks began to present themselves in ways that resembled the image of Khruba Siwichai. They adopted distinctive styles of Kasaya, such as reddish-brown or dark saffron robes worn in the old Lan Na tradition, carried rosaries, and used ceremonial fans made of palm leaves or peacock feathers. Many also sought to associate their personal histories and religious practices with those of Khruba Siwichai, claiming to follow his disciplinary practices, portraying themselves as temple builders and developers, presenting themselves as Ton Bun, or even claiming that they were reincarnations of Khruba Siwichai himself. Such representations became increasingly widespread among Northern Thai monks. One major factor is the rise of ⁣⁣localism and Lan Na cultural revivalism in the same period. In northern Thailand there were increasing attempts to recover local histories and celebrate regional heroes of history. One of the figures elevated to this status was Khruba Siwichai, who held a particularly prominent position. He became known as “the merit source of Lanna”.

Consequently, the image of Khruba Siwichai was repeatedly reproduced, reinforced and disseminated until it became deeply embedded in public consciousness and in Northern Thai. His image increasingly defined the very meaning of the term khruba, and became the model and standard against which the legitimacy of other Khrubas was measured.

== Notable Khrubas ==
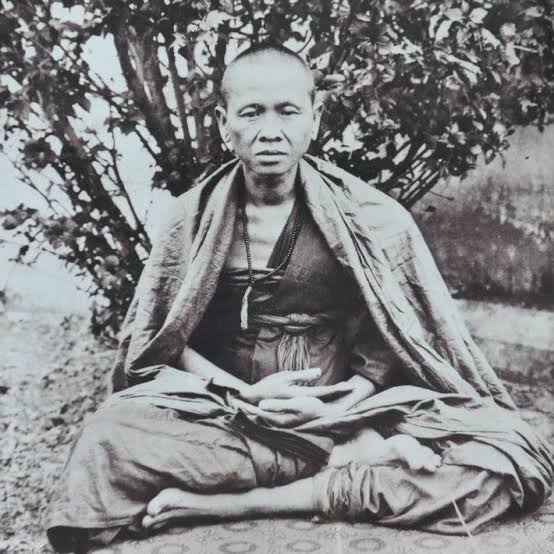
Khruba siwichai (1878–1939)

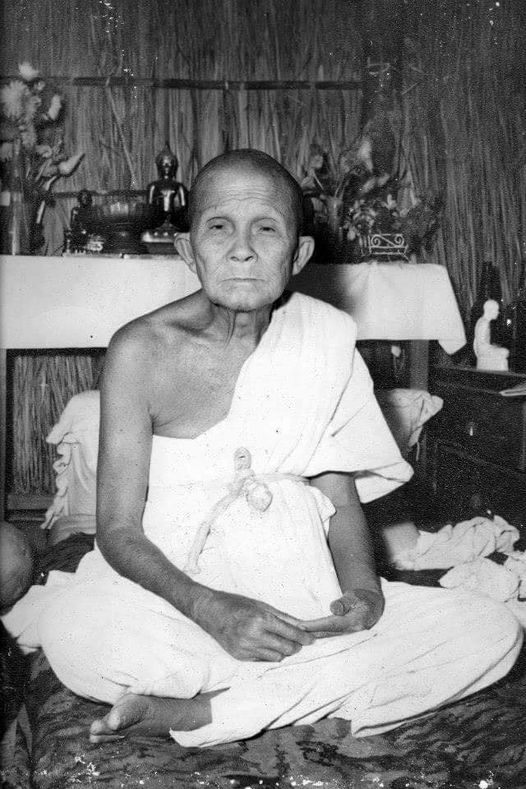
Khruba Apichai Khao Pi (1889–1997)

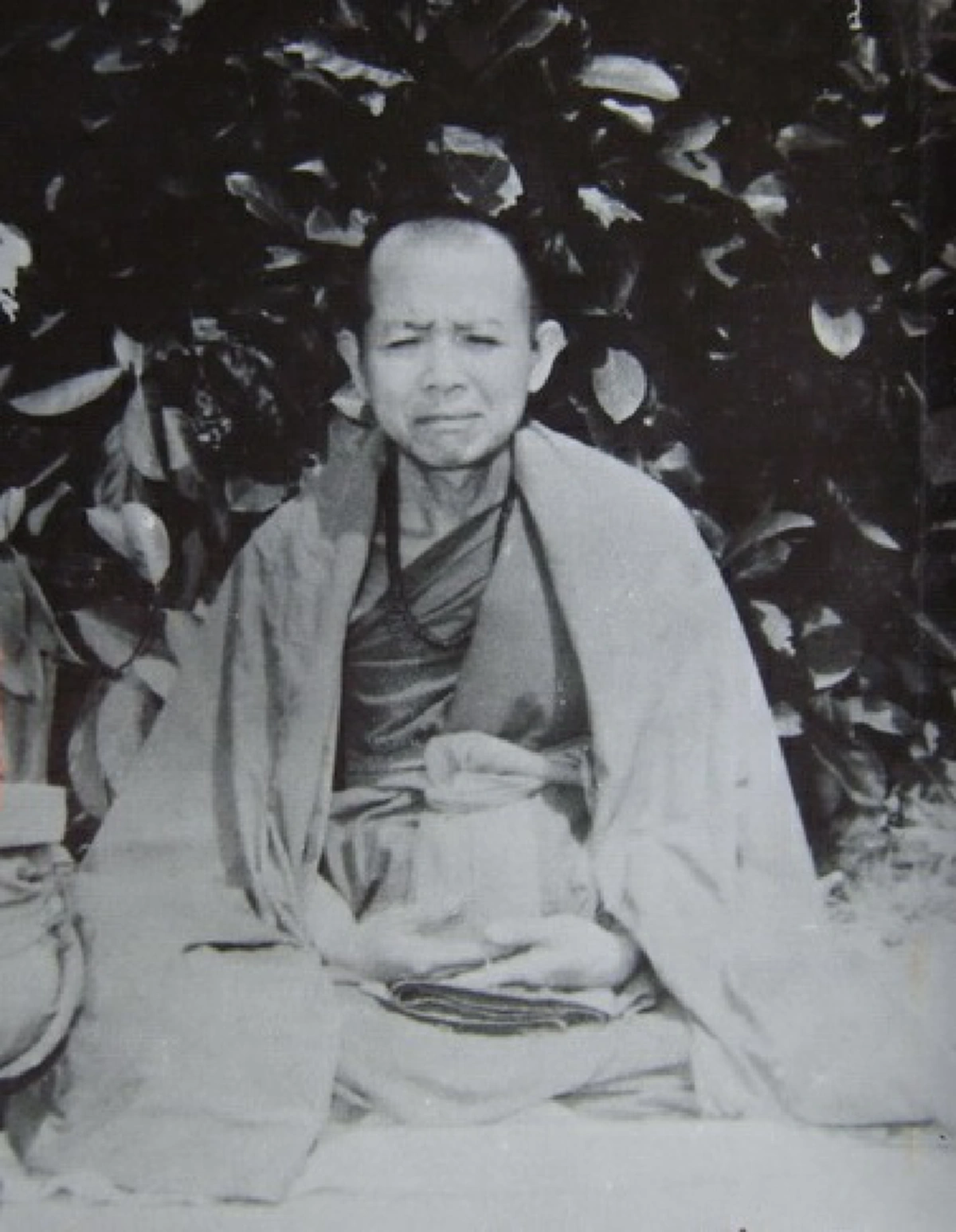
Khruba Khamla Sangwaro (1918–1990)

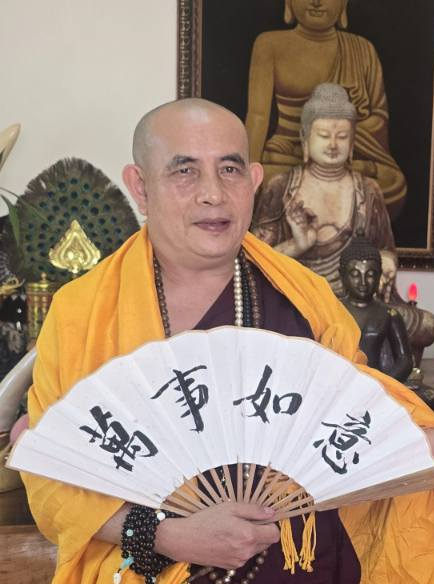
Khruba Boonchum (1965-)
