= Song Hong, Uttaradit =

Coordinates: 17.8845°N 100.8179°E

- Tambon
- Interactive map of Song Hong, Uttaradit
- Country: Thailand
- Province: Uttaradit
- District: Fak Tha District

Population (2005)
  - Total: 3,167
- Time zone: UTC+7 (ICT)

Song Hong, Uttaradit (Thai: สองห้อง, pronounced [sɔ̌ːŋ hɔ̂ŋ]) is a village and tambon (sub-district) of Fak Tha District, in Uttaradit Province, Thailand. In 2005 it had a population of 3,167 people. The tambon contains five villages.
