= Yan Yao, Mueang Phichit =

Yan Yao Thai: ย่านยาว
- Tambon
- Motto: เศรษฐกิจชุมชนอย่างยั่งยืน เมืองน่าอยู่ คู่คุณธรรม ("Sustainable community economy. Livable county with morality.")
- Interactive map of Yan Yao
- Coordinates: 16°29′48.7″N 100°16′00.8″E
- County: Thailand
- Province: Phichit
- District: Mueang Phichit

Government
  - Type: Subdistrict Administrative Organization (SAO)
  - Mayor: Rucky Sukprasert
  - Deputy Mayor: Winyu Kianyikiew

Area
  - Total: 46.695 km^{2} (18.029 sq mi)

Population (November 2024)
  - Total: 4,211
- Time zone: UTC+7 (ICT)
- Postcode: 66000
- Area code: (+66) 02
- Chief watercourse: Nan River

Yan Yao (Thai: ย่านยาว, pronounced [jâːn āːw]) is a tambon (subdistrct) of Mueang Phichit district, Phichit province, central Thailand.

== Background ==
In the past, Yan Yao was believed to be the location of a crocodile attack that devoured people living along the Nan river, which is the origin of a well-known Phichit folklore, Krai Thong.

== Geography ==
Yan Yao is located in the north and covers an area of approximately 46.695 km^{2}. Adjoining subdistricts, from north and moving clockwise, are Sanam Khli in Bang Krathum district of Phitsanulok province; Phai Khwang and Khlong Khachen in its district; and Sam Ngam in Sam Ngam district, respectively.

== Population ==
As of November 2024, it has a total population of 4,211 people.

== Administration ==
The subdistrict is under the administration of Yan Yao Subdistrict Administrative Organization.

It is also divided into 10 administrative mubans (villages) as follows:

No.	Name	Thai
1.	Ban Hat Mun Krabue	บ้านหาดมูลกระบือ
2.	Ban Yan Yao	บ้านย่านยาว
3.	Ban Wat Hong	บ้านวัดหงษ์
4.	Ban Wat Wang Kradi Thong	บ้านวัดวังกระดี่ทอง
5.	Ban Khlong Non	บ้านคลองโนน
6.	Ban Yan Yao	บ้านย่านยาว
7.	Ban Wat Hong	บ้านวัดหงษ์
8.	Ban Sanam Khli	บ้านสนามคลี
9.	Ban Non Huai Pat	บ้านโนนห้วยปัด
10.	Ban Wat Wang Kradi Thong Nuea	บ้านวัดวังกระดี่ทองเหนือ
