= Tha Lo railway station =

Railway station in Thailand

Coordinates: 16.5122°N 100.3300°E

Tha Lo ท่าฬ่อ

General information
- Location: Tha Lo Subdistrict, Phichit City
- Owner: State Railway of Thailand
- Line: Northern Line
- Platforms: 1
- Tracks: 2

Other information
- Station code: ทฬ.

History
- Opened: 24 January 1908; 118 years ago

Services
Preceding station	State Railway of Thailand	Following station
Phichit towards Hua Lamphong or Krung Thep Aphiwat	Northern Line	Bang Krathum towards Chiang Mai
Location

Tha Lo railway station is a railway station located in Tha Lo Subdistrict, Phichit City, Phichit. It is located 354.266 km from Bangkok railway station and is a class 3 railway station. It is on the Northern Line of the State Railway of Thailand. The station opened on 24 January 1908 as part of the Northern Line extension from Pak Nam Pho to Phitsanulok.
