= Taphan Hin railway station =

Railway station in Thailand

Coordinates: 16.2201°N 100.4240°E

Taphan Hin ตะพานหิน
- Station in 2026

General information
- Location: Chomtheravet Road, Taphan Hin Subdistrict, Taphan Hin District, Phichit
- Owner: State Railway of Thailand
- Line: Northern Line
- Platforms: 5
- Tracks: 5

Other information
- Station code: ตห.

History
- Opened: 24 January 1908; 118 years ago
- Rebuilt: 1956

Services
Preceding station	State Railway of Thailand	Following station
Dong Takhop towards Hua Lamphong or Krung Thep Aphiwat	Northern Line	Huai Ket towards Chiang Mai
Location

Taphan Hin railway station is a railway station located in Taphan Hin Subdistrict, Taphan Hin District, Phichit. It is located 319.006 km from Bangkok railway station and is a class 1 railway station. It is on the Northern Line of the State Railway of Thailand.

== History ==
The station opened on 24 January 1908 as part of the Northern Line extension from Pak Nam Pho to Phitsanulok. All trains used to stop here as Taphan Hin was once the largest city in Phichit, but now Phichit City has surpassed it in terms of development. The fact that every train had to make a stop here, not only to take on wood for the steam locomotives and water, but also because near the station there was a highway crossing the Phetchabun Mountains, further added to its importance. This road was built during World War II, in the era of Field Marshal Plaek Phibunsongkhram as Prime Minister, in preparation for relocating the capital from Bangkok to Phetchabun. Today, it is known as Highway 113, which now sees very little traffic because alternative routes to Phetchabun are more convenient.

The former station building was located on the west of the railway, on the district market side. In 1956, it was rebuilt into a concrete building and relocated to the east of the railway at the end of Highway 1381 (Chomtheravet Road).

== Notable features ==
Taphan Hin railway station has some notable features:

- The track layout is symmetrical. The main line (platform 3) is surrounded by 2 passing loops on each sides.
- Every track has its own platform.
- The wooden pedestrian bridge crossing over 5 railway tracks. It is the last surviving railway pedestrian bridge in Thailand that is made out of wood

== Gallery ==
Station building (viewed from pedestrian bridge)

Wooden pedestrian bridge

Track layout, looking towards Bangkok.

Old water tower

Adjacent stations sign.
