= Pho Prathap Chang district =

Pho Prathap Chang โพธิ์ประทับช้าง
- Amphoe
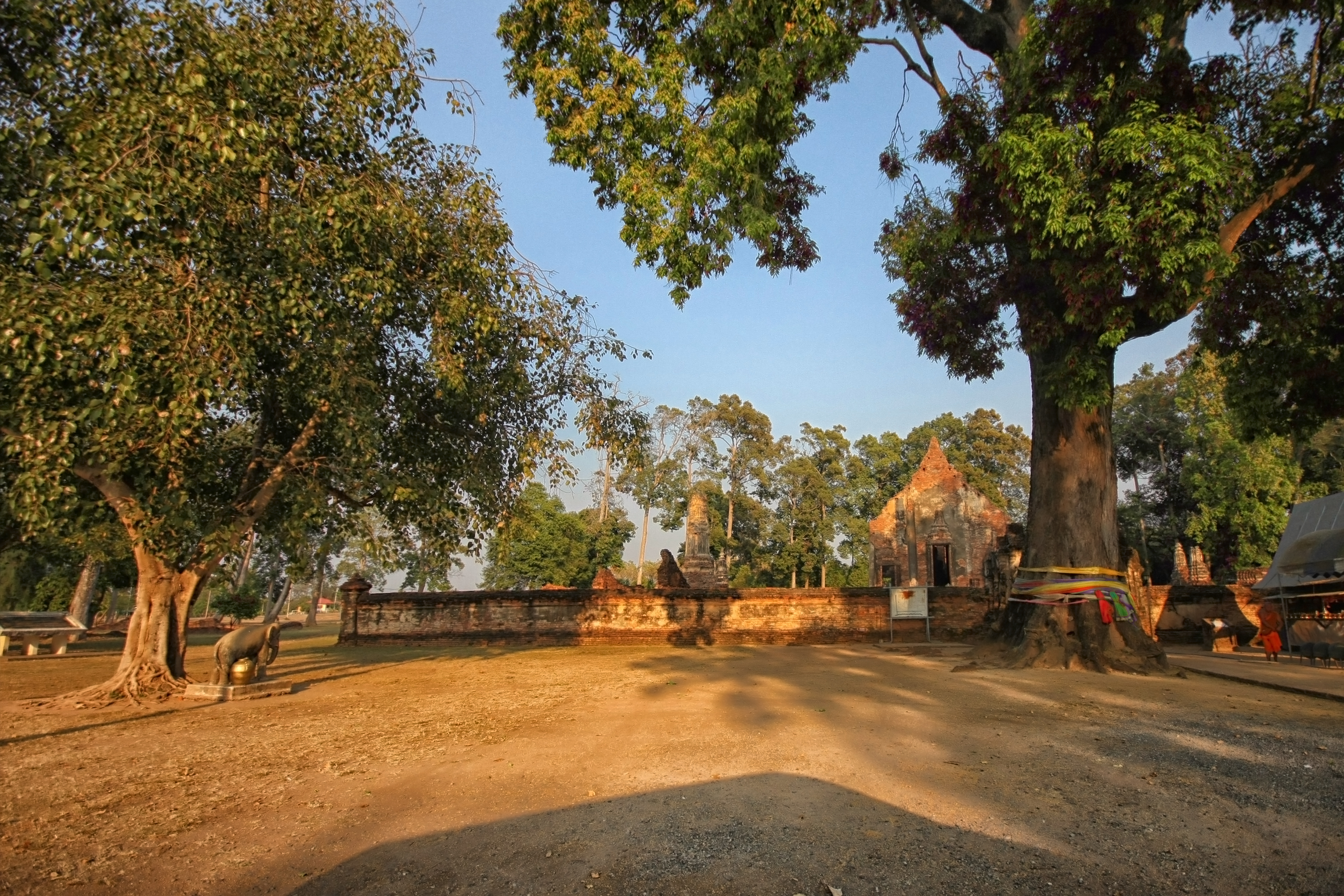
- Wat Pho Prathap Chang

- Amphoe location in Phichit province
- Coordinates: 16°18′40″N 100°16′30″E
- Country: Thailand
- Province: Phichit

Area
  - Total: 378.561 km^{2} (146.163 sq mi)

Population (2005)
  - Total: 43,684
  - Density: 115.4/km^{2} (299/sq mi)
- Time zone: UTC+7 (ICT)
- Postal code: 66190
- Geocode: 6603

Pho Prathap Chang (Thai: โพธิ์ประทับช้าง, pronounced [pʰōː prā.tʰáp t͡ɕʰáːŋ]) is a district (amphoe) in the western part of Phichit province, central Thailand.

== History ==
The government split off some parts of Mueang Phichit and Pho Thale Districts and formed the new Pho Prathap Chang minor district (king amphoe) on 24 June 1967. It was upgraded to a full district on 3 September 1973.

The district was named after the temple (Wat) Pho Prathap Chang, which was built by King Suea (Tiger King, Sanpet VIII, Suriyenthrathibodi) of Ayutthaya at his birthplace.

== Geography ==
Neighboring districts are (from the north clockwise) Sam Ngam, Mueang Phichit, Taphan Hin, Bueng Na Rang of Phichit Province and Bueng Samakkhi of Kamphaeng Phet province.

The important water resource is the Yom River.

== Administration ==
The district is divided into seven sub-districts (tambon), which are further subdivided into 99 villages (muban). Pho Prathap Chang is a township (thesaban tambon) and covers parts of the tambon Pho Prathap Chang, Phai Tha Pho and Wang Chik. There are a further seven tambon administrative organizations (TAO).

No.	Name	Thai name	Villages	Pop.
1.	Pho Prathap Chang	โพธิ์ประทับช้าง	12	6,126
2.	Phai Tha Pho	ไผ่ท่าโพ	12	6,241
3.	Wang Chik	วังจิก	10	4,744
4.	Phai Rop	ไผ่รอบ	18	7,795
5.	Dong Suea Lueang	ดงเสือเหลือง	12	5,378
6.	Noen Sawang	เนินสว่าง	16	6,057
7.	Thung Yai	ทุ่งใหญ่	19	7,343
