= Phichit (disambiguation) =

Phichit is a town in northern Thailand.

Phichit may also refer to:

- Phichit Province, Thailand
- Amphoe Mueang Phichit, the capital district of Phichit Province
