= Wat Tha Luang =

Buddhist temple in Thailand

Coordinates: 16°26′24″N 100°21′08.28″E

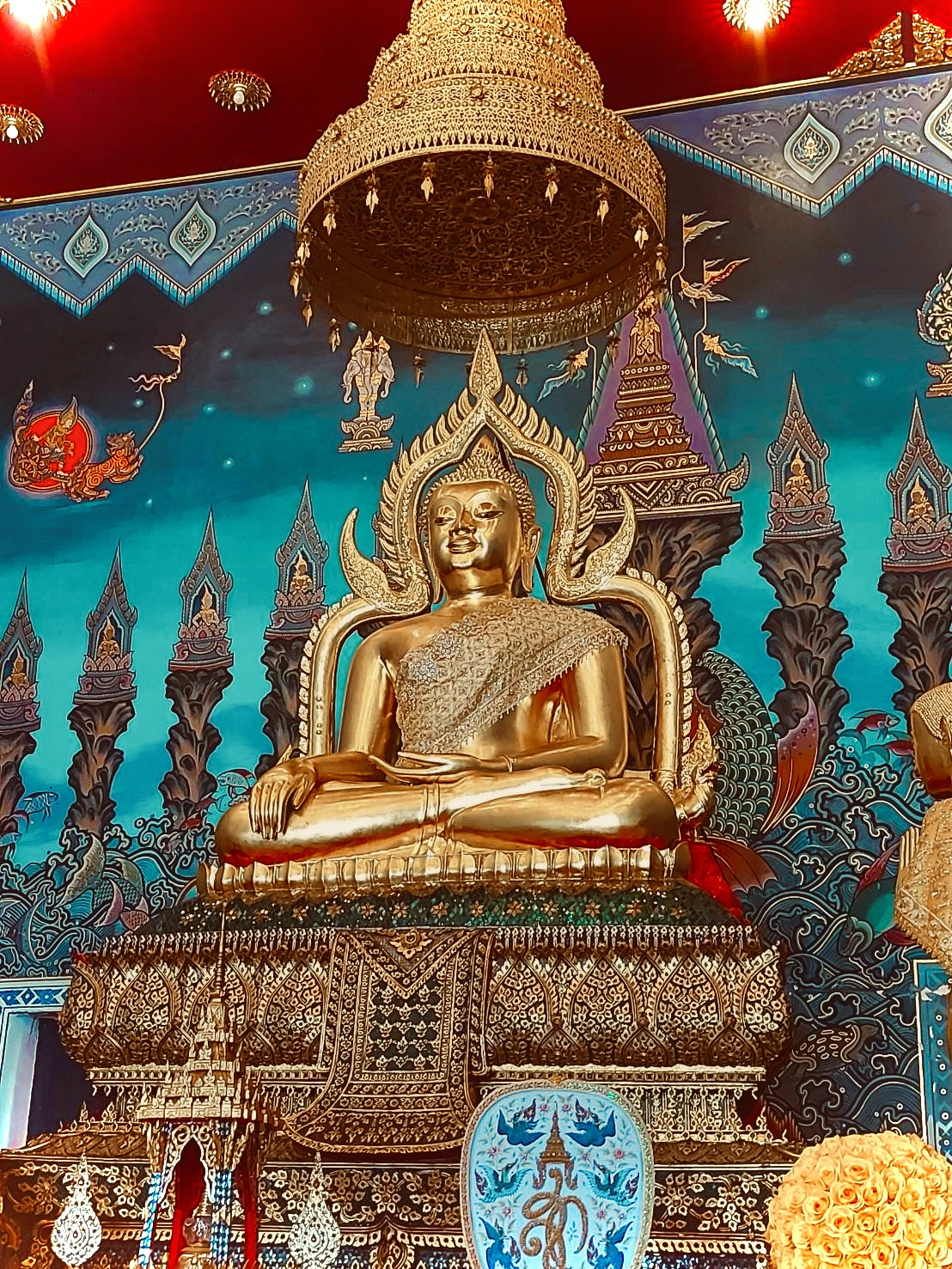
Luang Pho Phet

Wat Tha Luang (Thai: วัดท่าหลวง) is a Thai Buddhist temple in Tambon Nai Mueang, Amphoe Mueang Phichit, Phichit Province, upper central Thailand. Regarded as the most famous temple in the province and also considered as provincial temple. The temple sits on the Nan River's west bank close to the Provincial Hall.

== Description ==
This temple is believed to have been constructed in 1845 during the reign of King Nangklao (Rama III). Its name comes from the former tambon (sub-district) name that is the location. Wat Tha Luang was also known as Wat Ratchadittharam (วัดราชดิตถาราม) but this name is not as popular or known as it should be.

The temple was promoted to third-class royal monastery in 1986. The principal Buddha statue namely Luang Pho Phet (หลวงพ่อเพชร), a Chiang Saen style Buddha statue that is widely respected and worshipped by Phichit people and the general public. At present, Luang Pho Phet is enshrined in the main hall, which is open to worship daily from 06.30 am–06.00 pm.

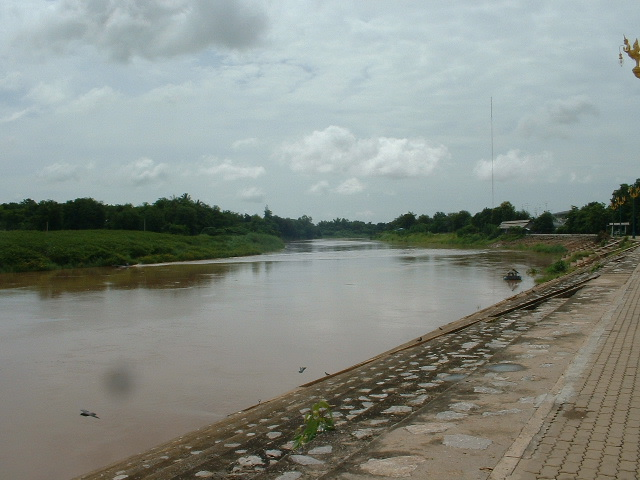
Phase of Nan River beside Wat Tha Luang

In addition, the Nan River flows through the temple, making it the venue where the annual King’s Cup long boat races take place around the early September. The racing has been held for a long time until it became a well-known local traditional, by starting up in the year 1907.
