= Chalawan (disambiguation) =

Chalawan is a character from the Thai folktale Krai Thong. The name may also refer to:

- Chalawan (reptile), an extinct genus of pholidosaurid mesoeucrocodylian
- Chalawan, an alternative name for 47 Ursae Majoris, a star in the constellation of Ursa Major
