= Wang Sai Phun district =

Wang Sai Phun วังทรายพูน
- Amphoe
- Amphoe location in Phichit province
- Coordinates: 16°23′18″N 100°32′18″E
- Country: Thailand
- Province: Phichit
- Seat: Nong Phra

Area
  - Total: 259.501 km^{2} (100.194 sq mi)

Population (2005)
  - Total: 25,541
  - Density: 98.4/km^{2} (255/sq mi)
- Time zone: UTC+7 (ICT)
- Postal code: 66180
- Geocode: 6602

Wang Sai Phun (Thai: วังทรายพูน, pronounced [wāŋ sāːj pʰūːn]) is a district (amphoe) in the eastern part of Phichit province, central Thailand.

== History ==
Tambon Wang Sai Phun, Nong Phra and Nong Pla Lai were separated from Mueang Phichit District and made up the new minor district (king amphoe) Wang Sai Phun on 1 August 1975. It was upgraded to a full district on July 13, 1981. The government assigned Tambon Nong Plong of Mueang Phichit to be part of Wang Sai Phun on 23 September 1993.

== Geography ==
Neighboring districts are (from the south clockwise) Thap Khlo, Taphan Hin, Mueang Phichit, Sak Lek of Phichit Province and Noen Maprang of Phitsanulok province.

== Administration ==
The district is divided into four sub-districts (tambon), which are further subdivided into 57 villages (muban). Wang Sai Phun is a township (thesaban tambon) which covers parts of tambon Wang Sai Phun and Nong Phra. There are a further four tambon administrative organizations (TAO).

No.	Name	Thai name	Villages	Pop.
1.	Wang Sai Phun	วังทรายพูน	14	8,899
2.	Nong Pla Lai	หนองปลาไหล	16	5,163
3.	Nong Phra	หนองพระ	17	8,006
4.	Nong Plong	หนองปล้อง	10	3,473
