= Banphot Phisai district =

Banphot Phisai บรรพตพิสัย
- District
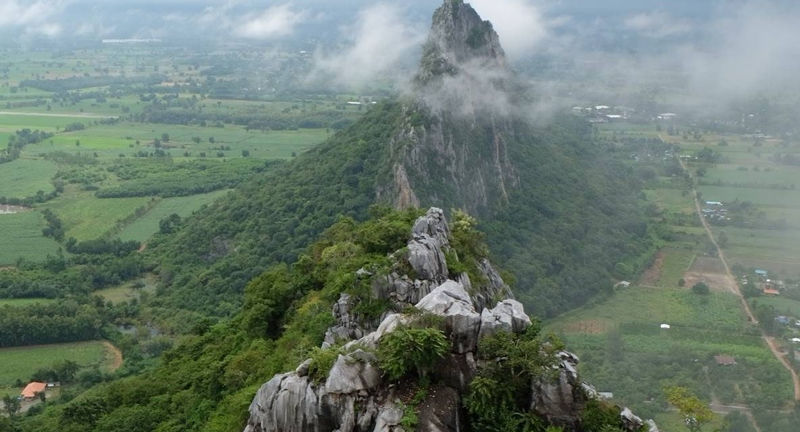
- Khao No-Khao Kaeo, a double hill and scenic viewpoint of the district

- District location in Nakhon Sawan province
- Coordinates: 15°56′9″N 99°58′56″E
- Country: Thailand
- Province: Nakhon Sawan

Area
  - Total: 909.9 km^{2} (351.3 sq mi)

Population (2005)
  - Total: 88,300
  - Density: 97.0/km^{2} (251/sq mi)
- Time zone: UTC+7 (ICT)
- Postal code: 60180
- Geocode: 6005

Banphot Phisai (Thai: บรรพตพิสัย, pronounced [bān.pʰót pʰí.sǎj]) is the northernmost district (amphoe) of Nakhon Sawan province, central Thailand.

== History ==
A walled and moated site at Dong Mae Nang Mueang, at Ban Map Makham in tambon Bang Ta Ngai, has yielded the oldest dated inscription found in Nakhon Sawan province. Numbered K. 766 and cut in Pali on one face and Old Khmer on the other, it records the endowment of rice fields for the upkeep of a relic, and is dated to 1167 or 1168. George Cœdès, who published it, judged the Pali face the oldest full inscription in that language found east of Burma.

At first, the central tambon was Tambon Ta Sang. In 1910, the government moved the district office to the west bank of the Ping River in the Tambon Tha Ngiew area and upgraded the district at the same time.

The name Banphot Phisai comes from the mountains in the district that look like rows of prang.

In September 2020, Khao No, a promontory in the district, was claimed by locals to be the habitat of a giant ape. A photo was produced as evidence. The story went viral in Thailand, attracting many to the area. Primatologists said the creature sighted on the hilltop was most likely just an ordinary monkey.

== Geography ==
Neighboring districts are (from the northeast clockwise): Bueng Na Rang and Pho Thale of Phichit province; Kao Liao, Mueang Nakhon Sawan, and Lat Yao of Nakhon Sawan Province; and Khanu Woralaksaburi and Bueng Samakkhi of Kamphaeng Phet province.

== Administration ==
The district is divided into 13 subdistricts (tambons), which are further subdivided into 117 villages (mubans). The township (thesaban tambon) Banphot Phisai covers parts of tambons Tha Ngio and Charoen Phon. There are further 13 Tambon Administrative Organizations (TAO).

No.	Name	Thai name	Villages	Pop.
1.	Tha Ngio	ท่างิ้ว	8	7,413
2.	Bang Ta Ngai	บางตาหงาย	7	6,963
3.	Hukwang	หูกวาง	4	4,446
4.	Ang Thong	อ่างทอง	6	4,190
5.	Ban Daen	บ้านแดน	9	7,189
6.	Bang Kaeo	บางแก้ว	8	5,603
7.	Ta Khit	ตาขีด	8	8,508
8.	Ta Sang	ตาสัง	11	7,284
9.	Dan Chang	ด่านช้าง	13	6,935
10.	Nong Krot	หนองกรด	15	11,737
11.	Nong Ta Ngu	หนองตางู	13	6,341
12.	Bueng Pla Thu	บึงปลาทู	9	4,221
13.	Charoen Phon	เจริญผล	6	7,470
