= Bueng Si Fai =

Lake in Nai Mueang, Thailand

Coordinates: 16°25′29.154″N 100°19′56.892″E

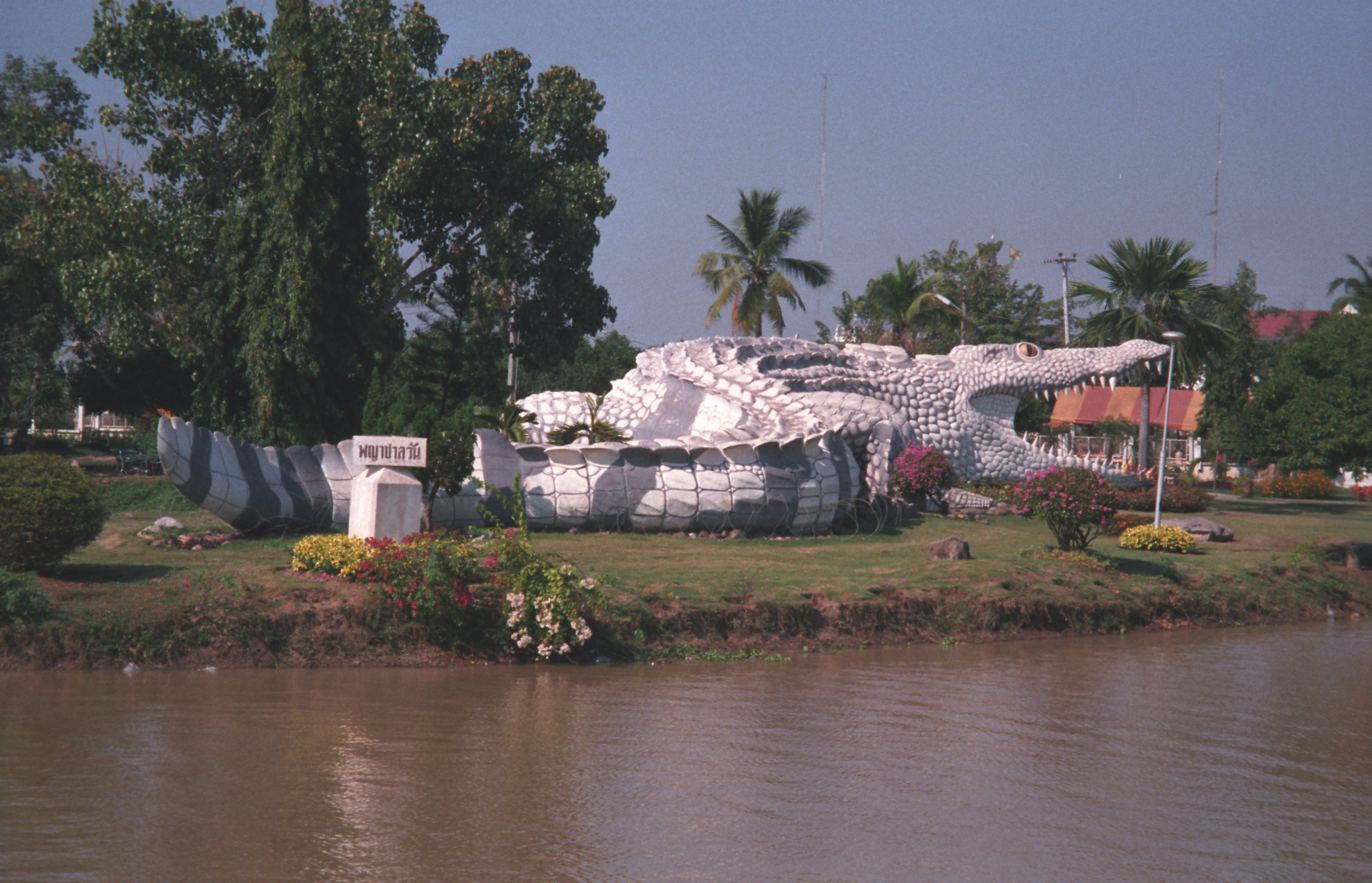
- Statue of Giant Crocodile or Phaya Chalawan at front of the lake

- Location within Thailand
- Location: upper central Thailand
- Type: Oxbow lake
- Primary inflows: Nan River
- Basin countries: Thailand
- Surface area: 8.624 km^{2} (3.33 sq mi)
- Average depth: 1.5–2 m (4–6 ft)
- Max. depth: 2 m (6 ft)
- Settlements: Nai Mueang, Mueang Phichit, Phichit

Bueng Si Fai (Thai: บึงสีไฟ, pronounced [bɯ̄ŋ sǐː fāj]) is a freshwater lake in central Thailand located in Nai Mueang Subdistrict, Mueang Phichit District, Phichit Province.

== Characteristics ==
Its name is roughly translated as "Fire Mill Marsh" regarded as an important source of freshwater fish breeding and also habitat for variety of birds. Bueng Si Fai is an oxbow lake by received water flowing from the Nan River. It is also considered a shallow lake, due to the depth of about 1.5–2 m (4–6 ft) only. This lake has a border with four tambons (subdistricts) of Mueang Phichit District, namely Tha Luang, Rong Chang, Khlong Khachen and Mueang Kao.

Originally, Bueng Si Fai was more than 10,000 rai (about 3,952 acres). Nowadays, it is reduced to only 5,390 rai (about 2,094 acres) which is affected by the opening of the Sirikit Dam. It is the fifth-largest freshwater lake in Thailand after Bueng Boraphet, Nong Han Lake, Bueng Lahan, Kwan Phayao, respectively.

== Places of interest ==
There are many places of interest around the lake:

- Chaloem Prakiat Aquarium (สถานแสดงพันธุ์ปลาเฉลิมพระเกียรติ), is a striking nine-sided building that stands on a path projecting out into the lake, and is operated by Inland Aquaculture Research and Development, Regional Center 3 (Phichit). Inside there are exhibits of a variety of species of both native and exotic fish, such as Java barbs, tinfoil barbs, blue sheatfishes, glass catfishes, Asian arowana, crystal-eyed catfish, silver arowana, black ghost knifefishes, as well as preserved endangered species which once lived here, such as giant freshwater stingrays and Siamese crocodiles.
- Princess Mother's Garden Phichit (สวนสมเด็จพระศรีนครินทร์ พิจิตร), a public park on lakeside with area of 170 rai (about 67 acres) built to honour Princess Srinagarindra in 1984.
- Crocodile Pond and Zoo (บ่อเลี้ยงจระเข้และสวนสัตว์), a pond for keeping crocodiles. Visitors can buy chicken ribs to feed the crocodiles. Adjoining is a zoo with animals such as ostriches.
- Giant Crocodile Statue (รูปปั้นจระเข้ยักษ์), regarded as the landmark of the lake, built according to folklore of Phichit, Krai Thong and Chalawan. Inside the statue is a meeting room with 25 to 30 seats.
