= Yao Yan =

Yao Yan is the name of:

- Yao Yan (badminton) (born 1974), Chinese badminton player
- Yao Yan (table tennis) (born 1988), Chinese table tennis player
- Yan Yao (Thailand), administrative division of Thailand
