= Busaba Athisthan =

Thai singer

Busaba Ahisthan (Thai: บุษบา อธิษฐาน) was a Thai, Luk thung singer.

== Early life ==
Busaba Athisthan was born on April 2, 1967, in Thap Khlo District, Phichit Province.

She was made famous by her songs "ท้ารัก" ["Challenge to Love"] and "จอห์นนี่ที่รัก" ["My Dear Johnny"]. She got into the music industry based on recommendations from Cholathi Thanthong and Phanom Nopporn, with her first song "สาวนครชัยศรี" ["Nakhon Chai Si Girl"] recorded in 1984. Later she would be known for fun and energetic songs, such as "ท้่ารัก" [Challenge to Love"], "โอ้โฮบางกอก" ["Whoa Bangkok"], "ชอบคนมีตังค์" ["Liking Rich People"], "นักรบนิรนาม" ["Nameless Warrior"], "ไม่รักอย่าหลอก" ["Don't Lead Me On"] and "จอห์นนี่ที่รัก" ["My Dear Johnny"] which were later re-recorded by Mangpor Chonthicha.

== Career ==
She joined the Nopporn Silver Gold record label in 1986. Athistan's most popular songs include "Nak Rop Nee Ra Nam" (Thai: นักรบนิรนาม), "Jer Nae" (Thai: เจอแน่), "Jhonny Thee Rak" (Thai: จอห์นนี่ที่รัก), and "Oh! Ho Bangkok" (Thai: โอ้โหบางกอก).

Busaba Athisthan died on September 18, 2001, 34 years old.
