= Sak Lek district =

Sak Lek สากเหล็ก
- Amphoe
- Amphoe location in Phichit province
- Coordinates: 16°30′35″N 100°28′10″E
- Country: Thailand
- Province: Phichit
- Seat: Sak Lek

Area
  - Total: 176.4 km^{2} (68.1 sq mi)

Population (2005)
  - Total: 24,376
  - Density: 138.2/km^{2} (358/sq mi)
- Time zone: UTC+7 (ICT)
- Postal code: 66160
- Geocode: 6609

Sak Lek (Thai: สากเหล็ก, pronounced [sàːk lèk]) is a district (amphoe) in the northeastern part of Phichit province, central Thailand.

== Geography ==
Neighboring districts are (from the south clockwise) Wang Sai Phun and Mueang Phichit of Phichit Province, Bang Krathum, Wang Thong and Noen Maprang of Phitsanulok province.

== History ==
The minor district was established on 1 April 1995 by splitting of the tambon Sak Lek, Tha Yiam, and Khlong Sai of Mueang Phichit district.

The Thai government on 15 May 2007, upgraded all 81 minor districts to full districts. With publication in the Royal Gazette on 24 August, the upgrade became official.

Its name "Sak Lek" directly translates as "steel pestle" since in the past a pestle cargo ship sank here. Hence, the name Sak Lek since then.

== Economy ==
Sak Lek is the largest plantation of mayong chit (mango plum) in Thailand, especially at Wang Thap Sai Subdistrict with an area of approximately 2,000 rais (790.51 acres).

== Administration ==
The district is divided into five sub-districts (tambon), which are further subdivided into 44 villages (muban). The township (thesaban tambon) Sak Lek covers parts of the tambon Sak Lek. There are a further five tambon administrative organizations (TAO).

No.	Name	Thai name	Villages	Pop.
1.	Sak Lek	สากเหล็ก	15	13,499
2.	Tha Yiam	ท่าเยี่ยม	6	3,114
3.	Khlong Sai	คลองทราย	10	2,534
4.	Nong Ya Sai	หนองหญ้าไทร	6	2,305
5.	Wang Thap Sai	วังทับไทร	7	2,924
