= Veera Theerapat =

Thai journalist and talk radio host

- Theerapat in 2026
- Born: Veera Dhirapatranon; 13 April 1957 (age 69); Taphan Hin, Phichit, Thailand
- Other name: Arjan Veera (Professor Veera)
- Citizenship: Thai
- Education: Suankularb Wittayalai School; Thammasat University
- Occupations: Journalist; radio presenter; TV host; columnist; author
- Years active: 1980–present
- Notable work: Khui Kan Chan Thueng Sook; Khui Dai Khui Dee (Talk News & Music); Fang Hu Wai Hu; Khui Khai Kid
- Relatives: Nattapong Theerapattranon (nephew)

Veera Dhirapatranon (Thai: วีระ ธีระภัทรานนท์; born 13 April 1957), generally known as Veera Theerapat (วีระ ธีรภัทร) is a Thai journalist, radio presenter, news TV host, and author. He became known for his talk radio shows during the late 1990s to early 2000s, where he used a shock jock–style, speaking bluntly and often ridiculing callers.

== Early life ==
Born and grew up in Phichit Province, Theerapat completed his lower secondary education at La Salle Chotiravi Nakhonsawan School and later graduated from Suankularb Wittayalai School in Bangkok (class 88, upper secondary), where he lived with his aunt in the Thanon Tok area, enrolled in 1969 at the age of 12, and was a classmate of Jurin Laksanawisit. He earned a bachelor's degree from the Faculty of Political Science, Thammasat University. He got a job in the media immediately following graduation in 1978 at the urging of a senior friend.

== Career ==
He was one of the journalists that followed Prime Minister Gen Prem Tinsulanonda on visits to Denmark in 1981, it also was his first trip abroad.

In 1984, he became the Daily News's first economics editor.

He was an assistant foreign news editor of Matichon including serving as editor-in-chief of Wattajak. He was the president of The Economic Reporters Association between 1988 and 1989. He started hosting his first radio program in 1995.

Since July 1998, Theerapat has become widely known as a radio host for "Khui Kan Chan Thueng Sook" (คุยกันจันทร์ถึงศุกร์, "talk Monday to Friday") on Trinity Radio (now Family Radio), whose studio is located at the end of Soi Lalai Sap in the Silom area. The program allows phone-in listeners to come and talk to the host. He speaks loudly and argues with his audience. During his show's peak popularity (circa 1999 – early 2000s), it was an afternoon radio program that was not the highest rating music program on FM in Thailand.

In 2004, he began his television career by becoming a co-host of "Ban Lake Thee Ha" (บ้านเลขที่ 5, "house no. 5"), a weekday morning variety program on Channel 5, as well as other programs of a similar format. Later that same year, during the Bangkok gubernatorial election, he hosted a special program on the same channel focusing on the election. The program was broadcast every Thursday throughout the campaign period.

With increasing age causing reducing his aggressiveness, he began to offer more diverse content, such as history or narrating Indian epic Mahabharata.

== Personal life ==
His father, the son of Chinese immigrants born in Thailand, was a rice trader in Nakhon Sawan who continued the family's business from his own father. His mother was a merchant of mixed Chinese and Lao Wiang descent from Saraburi. He has one older sister and one younger brother. Theerapat is married but has no children. During his holidays, he spends his days at his weekend house in Chon Daen District, Phetchabun Province, where he named it "Arsom Sonthaya" (อาศรมสนธยา, "twilight hermitage").

== Partial works ==
=== Television ===
- Ban Lake Thee Ha (บ้านเลขที่ 5) on Channel 5 (2004)
- Siam Chao Nee (Siam Today) (สยามเช้านี้) on Channel 5 (2004)
- Khui Kan Wan Yood (คุยกันวันหยุด) on Channel 5 (2004)
- Ta Sawang (ตาสว่าง) on Channel 9 (2008)
- Tam Roi Pong Sawa Dan (ตามรอยพงศาวดาร) on Channel 5 (2008)
- Khui Rob Thit (คุยรอบทิศ) on Channel 9 (2018 – 2021)
- Fang Hu Wai Hu (ฟังหูไว้หู) on Channel 9 (– present)
- Khui Khai Kid (คุยให้คิด) on Thai PBS (2022 – present)

=== Radio ===
- Pak Thong Chao Ban (ปากท้องชาวบ้าน) on FM 101 MHz (1995)
- Khui Kan Chan Thueng Sook (คุยกันจันทร์ถึงศุกร์) on FM 97.0 MHz (1998 – 2008)
- Ngoen Thong Tong Ru (เงินทองต้องรู้) on FM 90.5 MHz
- Khao Pen Khao (ข่าวเป็นข่าว) on FM 105 MHz (2008)
- Talk News & Music (คุยได้คุยดี) on FM 96.5 MHz (2008 – present)

=== Written ===
==== Column ====
- Pak Thong Chao Ban (ปากท้องชาวบ้าน) on Daily News
- Pak Thong Khong Rao (ปากท้องของเรา) on Krungthep Turakij (Bangkokbiznews)
- Ngoen Thong Tong Ru (เงินทองต้องรู้) on Kom Chad Luek
- Hom Pak Hom Kho (หอมปากหอมคอ) on Kom Chad Luek

==== Book ====
- Lok Haeng Chiwit & Bantuek Haeng Chiwit (โลกแห่งชีวิต และ บันทึกแห่งชีวิต) (2 volumes) (1981) (translation of Hugh Prather's I Touch the Earth, the Earth Touches Me, under the pen name Waraporn)
- Lao Tao Tee Ru (เล่าเท่าที่รู้) (2009)
- The Story From The Epic Mahabharata (เรื่องเล่าจากมหากาพย์มหาภารตะ) (4 volumes) (2010)
- Khon Rai Rak (คนไร้ราก) (autobiography) (2018)
- On Painting (On Painting เห็นมากับตาว่าด้วยภาพเขียน) (2020)
- The Story From Arsom Sonthaya (เรื่องเล่าจากอาศรมสนธยา) (2021)
- From Cicero To Caesar & From Pompey To Caesar (จากซิเซโรถึงซีซาร์ และ จากปอมปีย์ถึงซีซาร์) (2 volumes) (2018 – 2022)
