= Tha Lo, Phichit =

Sub-district of Mueang Phichit District, Phichit Province, Thailand

Coordinates: 16.518333°N 100.326667°E

Tha Lo (Thai: ท่าฬ่อ, pronounced [tʰâː lɔ̂ː]) is a tambon (sub-district) of Mueang Phichit District, Phichit Province, upper central Thailand.

== History ==
The name "Tha Lo" is directly translated as "pier of mules", referring to a pier on the riverbank where mules were once loaded and unloaded. However, according to local tradition, the name is thought to have been distorted from "Tha Lo" (ท่าล้อ [tʰâː lɔ́ː]), meaning "pier of wheels". In the past, this area was a hub for wheeled vehicles used for hauling timber and wagons that transported agricultural products.

Tha Lo is regarded as one of the oldest communities in Phichit. Situated at the confluence of the Wang Thong River (locally known as Khlong Tha Lo) and the Nan River, it became an important water trade route during the Ayutthaya period. Wat Tha Lo serves as the community's spiritual anchor, while San Chao Mae Thap Thim Tha Lo, a Chinese temple located on the east bank of the Nan River, houses an ancient shrine dedicated to Shui Wei Sheng Niang, the goddess of the sea and navigation in Chinese belief. The wooden idol enshrined here is considered the oldest carved image of Shui Wei Sheng Niang in Thailand.

Today, locals continue to preserve their traditional way of life.

== Geography ==
Its terrain is a floodplain, suitable for agriculture, with a total area of 21.9 km^{2} (13,688 rai).

Sub-districts adjacent to Tha Lo are (from north clockwise): Phi Lom in Bang Krathum District of Phitsanulok Province, Pa Makhap in its district, Pak Thang in its district, and Phai Khwang in its district, respectively.

== Administration ==
Tha Lo is administered by the Subdistrict Administrative Organization (SAO) Tha Lo (องค์การบริหารส่วนตำบลท่าฬ่อ).

Tha Lo also consists of 7 administrative villages (muban). The village no. 1, 3, 4 are outside the municipality and 8 km (4 mi) from Phichit town.

== Economy ==
Most of the locals work in agriculture and fisheries.

== Transportation ==
Tha Lo is served by the Tha Lo railway station of the State Railway of Thailand (SRT), whose Northern Line runs through the area. The station is about 354 km (219 mi) from Bangkok railway station (Hua Lamphong). The viaduct across the Nan River of Tha Lo was built in 1966 by Mitsui & Co., Ltd. of Japan.

== Places ==
- Wat Tha Lo
- Chao Mae Thap Thim Tha Lo Shrine
- Tha Lo Market
- Yok Eng Chinese School

== Local products ==
- Thai desserts
- Artificial bonsai
