= Sam Ngam district =

Sam Ngam สามง่าม
- District
- District location in Phichit province
- Coordinates: 16°30′32″N 100°12′17″E
- Country: Thailand
- Province: Phichit
- Seat: Sam Ngam
- Tambon: 5
- Muban: 80

Area
  - Total: 338.08 km^{2} (130.53 sq mi)

Population (2015)
  - Total: 42,775
  - Density: 130.4/km^{2} (338/sq mi)
- Time zone: UTC+7 (ICT)
- Postal code: 66140
- Geocode: 6607

Sam Ngam (Thai: สามง่าม, pronounced [sǎːm ŋâːm]) is a district (amphoe) in the northwestern part of Phichit province, central Thailand.

== History ==
Originally Sam Ngam was a tambon of Tha Luang district. On 1 March 1939 the government separated Tambons Sam Ngam, Rang Nok, Wang Chik, Phai Rop, Ban Na, and Noen Po from Mueang Phichit District, Kamphaeng Din and Hat Kruat from Bang Krathum district, Phitsanulok province to establish the new district, Sam Ngam. Later in 1943 Tambon Wang Chik and Phai Rop were assigned to Pho Prathap Chang District.

== Geography ==
Neighboring districts are (from the east clockwise) Mueang Phichit, Pho Prathap Chang of Phichit Province, Bueng Samakkhi, Sai Thong Watthana, Sai Ngam of Kamphaeng Phet province, Wachirabarami of Phichit Province, Bang Rakam and Bang Krathum of Phitsanulok province.

== Administration ==
=== Central administration ===
Sam Ngam is divided into five sub-districts (tambons), which are further subdivided into 80 administrative villages (mubans).

No.	Name	Thai	Villages	Pop.
1.	Sam Ngam	สามง่าม	16	9,334
2.	Kamphaeng Din	กำแพงดิน	12	5,826
3.	Rang Nok	รังนก	12	6,113
6.	Noen Po	เนินปอ	20	9,078
7.	Nong Sano	หนองโสน	20	12,424

Missing numbers are districts which now form Wachirabarami District.

=== Local administration ===
There are three sub-district municipalities (thesaban tambons) in the district:

- Kamphaeng Din (Thai: เทศบาลตำบลกำแพงดิน) consisting of parts of sub-district Kamphaeng Din.
- Sam Ngam (Thai: เทศบาลตำบลสามง่าม) consisting of parts of sub-district Sam Ngam.
- Noen Po (Thai: เทศบาลตำบลเนินปอ) consisting of sub-district Noen Po.

There are four sub-district administrative organizations (SAO) in the district:

- Sam Ngam (Thai: องค์การบริหารส่วนตำบลสามง่าม) consisting of parts of sub-district Sam Ngam.
- Kamphaeng Din (Thai: องค์การบริหารส่วนตำบลกำแพงดิน) consisting of parts of sub-district Kamphaeng Din.
- Rang Nok (Thai: องค์การบริหารส่วนตำบลรังนก) consisting of sub-district Rang Nok.
- Nong Sano (Thai: องค์การบริหารส่วนตำบลหนองโสน) consisting of sub-district Nong Sano.
