= Mangpor Chonthicha =

Thai singer

- แมงปอ ชลธิชา
- Born: Pimpatcha Thongdaeng; 12 May 1983 (age 43); Khon Kaen Province, Thailand
- Education: Bangkok University
- Occupation: Singer
- Musical career
- Genres: Pop, Luk thung, Country blues, ballad, Gospel, Jazz, Disco, Folk, Country rock
- Years active: 1999–present
- Label: Nopporn Silvergold

Mangpor Cholthicha (Thai: แมงปอ ชลธิชา) is a famous Thai Luk thung singer and actress.

== Early life ==
Mangpor Cholthicha (12 May 1983) was born into a poor family in Khon Kaen Province. She is the oldest daughter of Kwanchai and Phitsamai Thongdaeng but younger than all her brothers. Her birth name is Pimpatcha Thongdaeng (Thai: พิมพ์พัชชา ทองแดง). Since her family was very poor, they had to relocate from her birthplace, to other places such as Chonburi, Nonthaburi and Phra Nakhon Si Ayutthaya. From a young age, she had to help in raising her family.

== Entertainers ==
She began her music career in 1999, when she was a singer with Nopporn Silvergold label and stayed there until 2012. She was also an actress on Channel 7. In 2012, she was a singer with R-Siam label. Currently, she is an independent singer.

== Discography ==
=== Albums ===
- Sao Sip Hok (สาว 16)
- Noo Kluay Tukkae (หนูกลัวตุ๊กแก)
- Tam Ha Som Chai (ตามหาสมชาย)
- Nang Sao Nanzee (นางสาวแนนซี่)
- Mae Kruay Hua Khai (แม่ครัวหัวไข่)
- Mang Poe Loe Rak (แมงปอล้อรัก)
- Tha Rak (ท้ารัก) (Original is Busaba Athisthan.)
- Jhonny Thee Rak (จอห์นนี่ที่รัก) (Original is Busaba Athisthan.)
- Rued Kha (เริ่ดค่ะ)

== Filmography ==
=== TV Series ===
- 1999 – Nang Eak Lang Ban (นางเอกหลังบ้าน)
- 2000
  - Kam Ma Thep Luang (กามเทพลวง)
  - Nang Sib Song (นางสิบสอง)
- 2001
  - Kaew Na Ma (แก้วหน้าม้า)
  - Nay Hoi Tha Min (นายฮ้อยทมิฬ)
  - Ton Rak (ต้นรัก)
- 2010 – Mae Sri Prai (แม่ศรีไพร)

== Family life ==
In 2008, she married Anuiyhad Seesawad, however, they divorced in 2010.

In 2015, she started dating Piyaphong Champafueang, and in 2017 she gave birth to a son. The reason she and her partner did not marry, was because she was saving money to raise her son.
