= List of Thai Meteorological Department weather stations in northern Thailand =

Thai Meteorological Department (TMD) has a total of 118 weather stations throughout Thailand, including 21 Agromet stations.

== Weather stations in Thailand ==
Thailand is according to Thai Meteorological Department (TMD) for climatic observations divided into six regions: northern, northeastern, eastern, central, southern (west coast) and southern (east coast) Thailand.

== Northern region ==
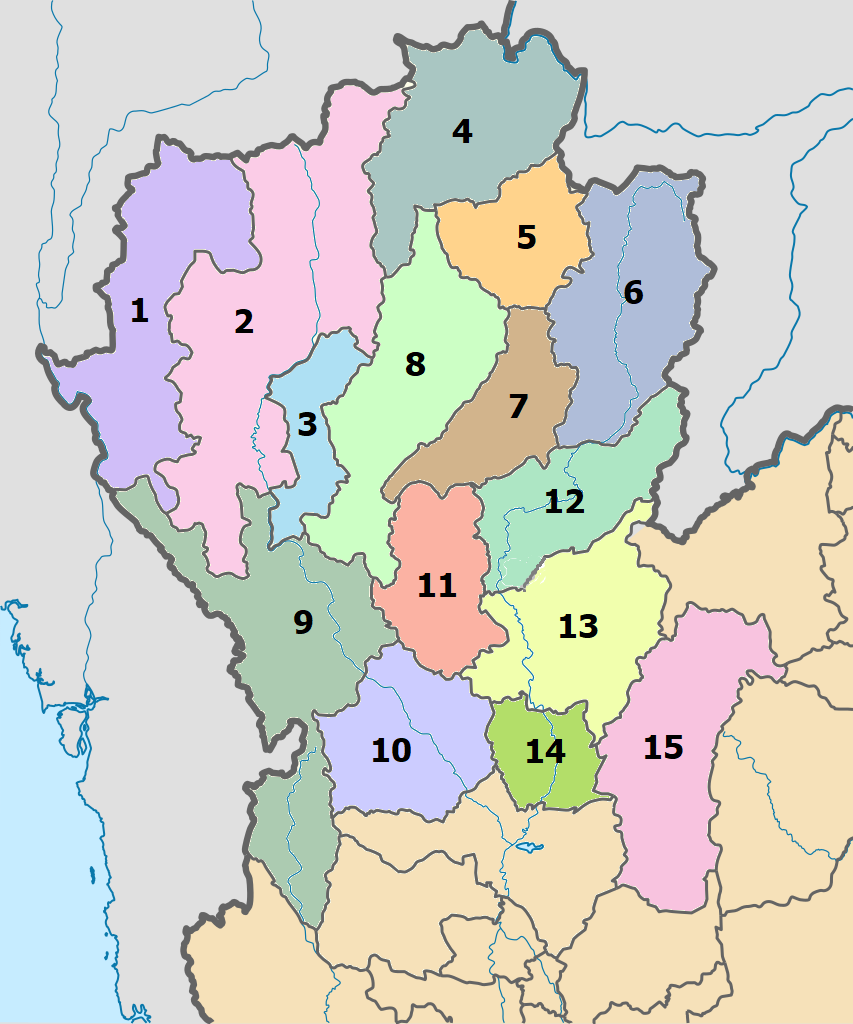
Northern region TMD

The northern region includes the 15 provinces:

1. Mae Hong Son
2. Chiang Mai
3. Lamphun
4. Chiang Rai
5. Phayao
6. Nan
7. Phrae
8. Lampang
9. Tak
10. Kamphaeng Phet
11. Sukhothai
12. Uttaradit
13. Phitsanulok
14. Phichit
15. Phetchabun

=== TMD weather stations in northern Thailand ===
There are a total of 29 weather stations in northern Thailand, including 5 Agromet stations.

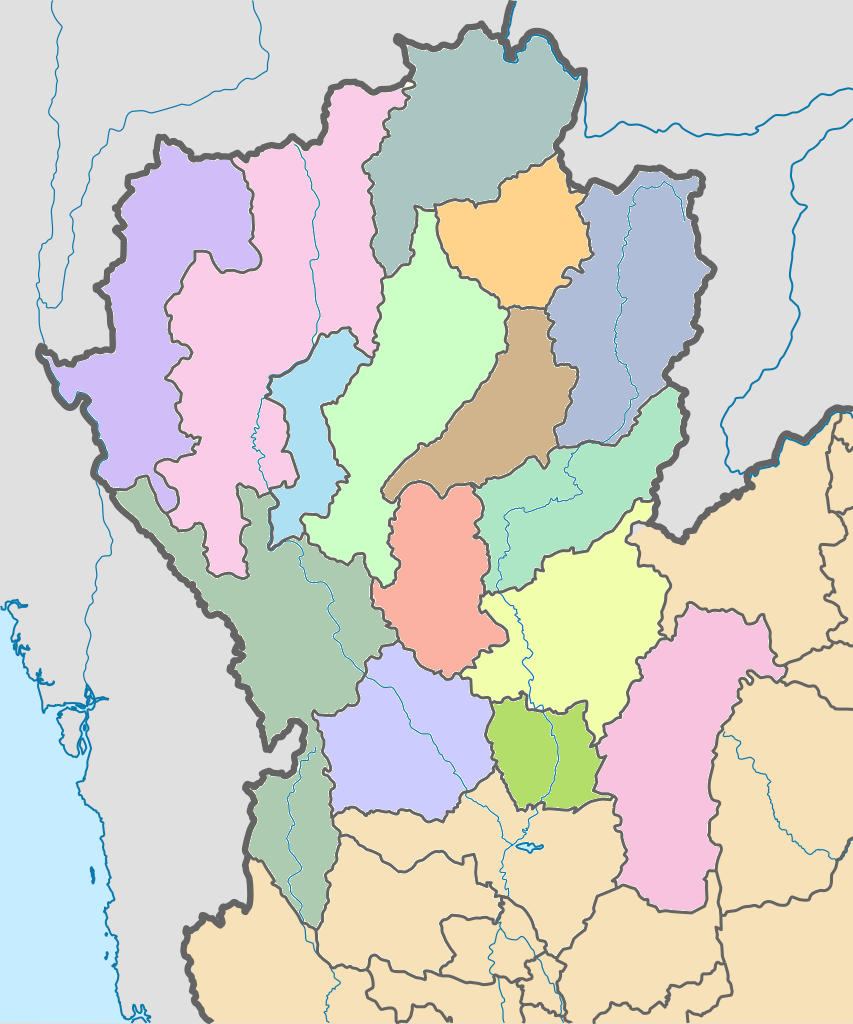
North Thailand with 29 weather stations

TMD weather stations in northern Thailand
Station name	#	Province	Station	North	East	Height	Height
Mae Sariang	1	Mae Hong Son	48325	18.17°	097.93°	211 m	692 ft
Mae Hong Son	2	Mae Hong Son	48300	19.30°	097.98°	268 m	879 ft
Doi Ang Khang	3	Chiang Mai	48302	19.92°	099.03°	1,530 m	5,020 ft
Chiang Mai	4	Chiang Mai	48327	18.78°	098.98°	313 m	1,027 ft
Lamphun + WR	5	Lamphun	48329	18.57°	099.03°	296 m	971 ft
Chiang Rai + WR	6	Chiang Rai	48303	19.89°	099.83°	390 m	1,280 ft
Chiang Rai A.	7	Chiang Rai	48304	19.87°	099.77°	401 m	1,316 ft
Phayao	8	Phayao	48310	19.13°	099.90°	397 m	1,302 ft
Thung Chang	9	Nan	48307	19.42°	100.88°	333 m	1,093 ft
Tha Wang Pha + WR	10	Nan	48315	19.12°	100.80°	235 m	771 ft
Nan	11	Nan	48331	18.81°	100.78°	200 m	656 ft
Phrae	12	Phrae	48330	18.13°	100.17°	162 m	531 ft
Lampang A.	13	Lampang	48334	18.32°	099.28°	319m	1,047 ft
Lampang	14	Lampang	48328	18.27°	099.50°	242 m	794 ft
Thoen	15	Lampang	48324	17.63°	099.25°	192 m	630 ft
Bhumibol dam	16	Tak	48377	17.23°	099.05°	143 m	469 ft
Tak	17	Tak	48376	16.90°	099.25°	125 m	410 ft
Doi Mu Soe A.	18	Tak	48387	16.75°	098.93°	368 m	1,207 ft
Mae Sot	19	Tak	48375	16.70°	098.55°	196 m	643 ft
Umphang	20	Tak	48385	16.02°	098.87°	454 m	1,490 ft
Kamphaeng Phet	21	Kamphaeng Phet	48380	16.48°	099.53°	80 m	262 ft
Sukhothai	22	Sukhothai	48372	17.10°	099.80°	48 m	157 ft
Si Samrong A.	23	Sukhothai	48373	17.17°	099.87°	54 m	169 ft
Uttaradit	24	Uttaradit	48351	17.62°	100.10°	63 m	180 ft
Phitsanulok + WR	25	Phitsanulok	48378	16.78°	100.28°	44 m	144 ft
Phichit A.	26	Phichit	48386	16.33°	100.37°	40m	131 ft
Lom Sak	27	Phetchabun	48374	16.77°	101.25°	143 m	469 ft
Phetchabun + WR	28	Phetchabun	48379	16.43°	101.15°	114m	374 ft
Wichian Buri	29	Phetchabun	48413	15.58°	101.12°	68 m	223 ft

Height = Elevation weather station above Median Sea Level
A = Agromet WR = Weather Radar with radius of 120 km or 240 km

=== TMD weather station Phitsanulok ===
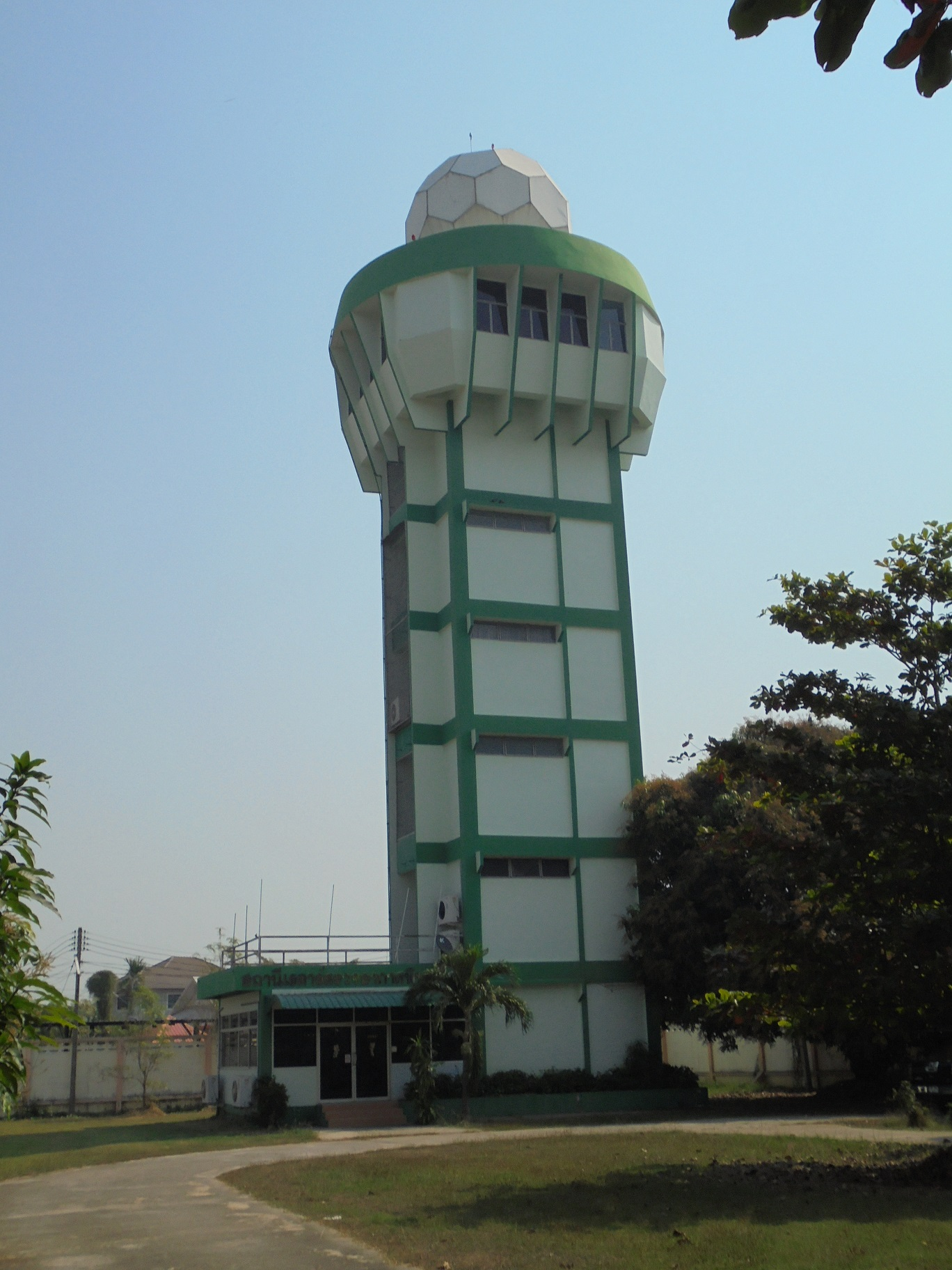
Weather station Phitsanulok

Like all TMD weather stations in Thailand, the weather station has its own website. The weather forecasts are at 1.00, 4.00, 7.00, 10.00, 13.00, 16.00, 19.00 and 22.00 hour.
This weather station (48378) distributes the weather forecasts every day at 7.30, 8.30, 12.30,13.30,19.30 and 20.30 via radio broadcast on FM 104.25 MHz, these include the weather forecasts of the five neighboring weather stations.
The weather station is located near Phitsanulok airport. But both the Royal Thai Air Force and civil aviation use their own weather station for the pilots' briefing.
In the northern region just five stations have a weather radar with a radius of 120 km or 240 km, they are station Chiang Rai, Lamphun, Phitsanulok, Phetchabun and Tha Wang Pha.

=== Agromet station Phichit ===
Agromet stations deliver climatic data direct to TMD centers. Agromet station Phichit (48386) distributes the weather forecasts every day at 1.00, 4.00, 7.00, 10.00, 13.00, 16.00, 19.00 and 22.00 hour via its own website.

Agromet station Phichit: a range of instruments

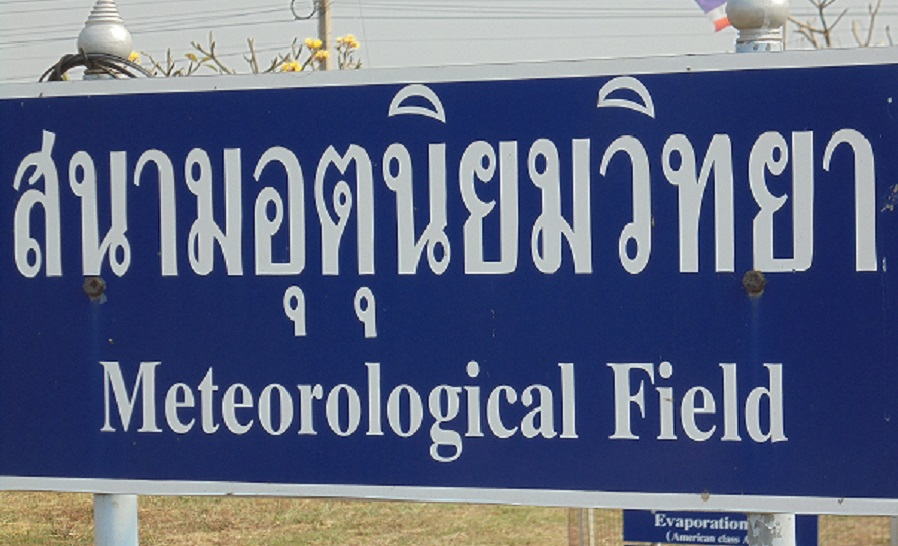

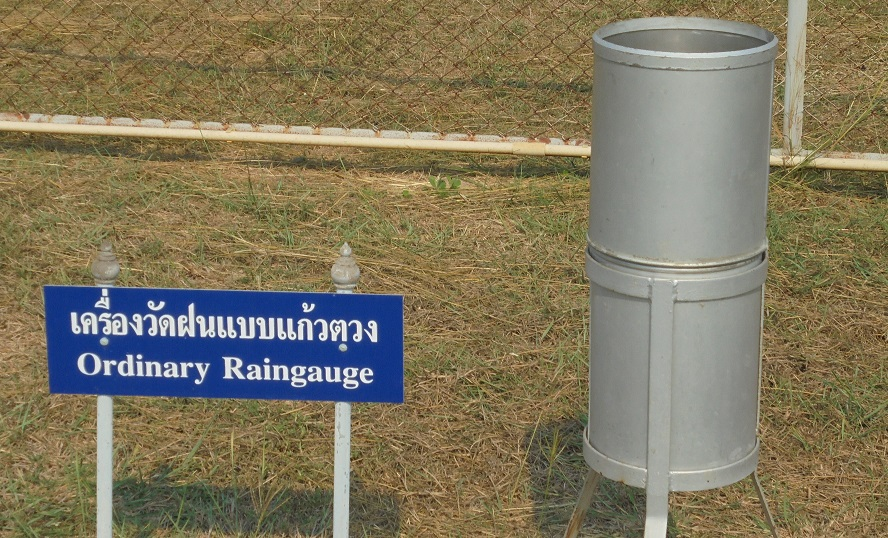

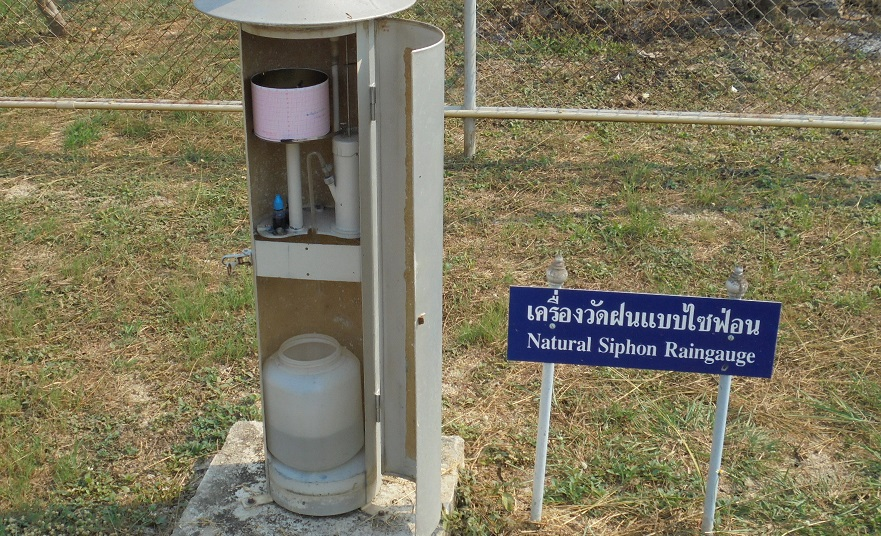

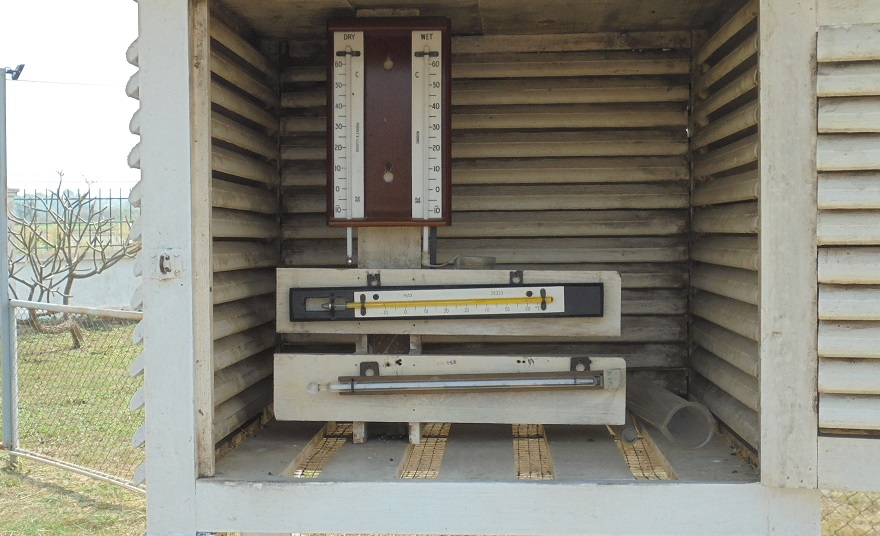

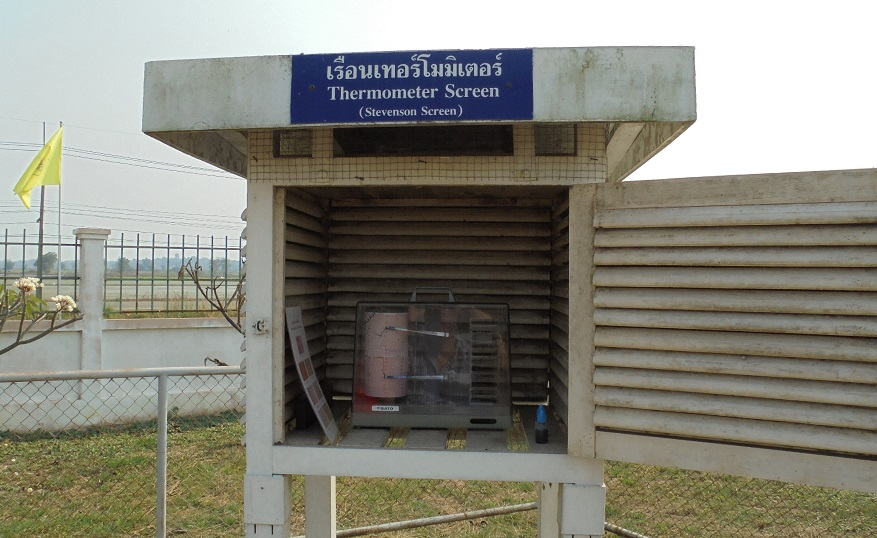

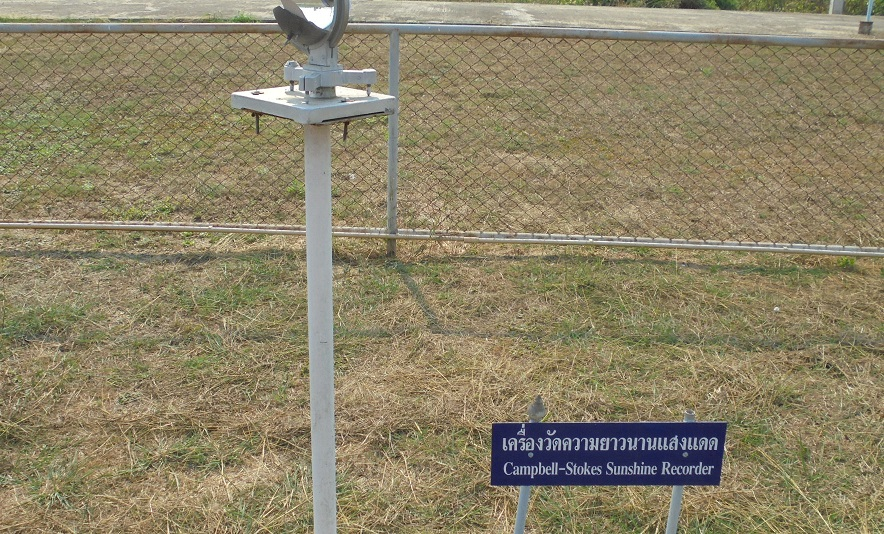

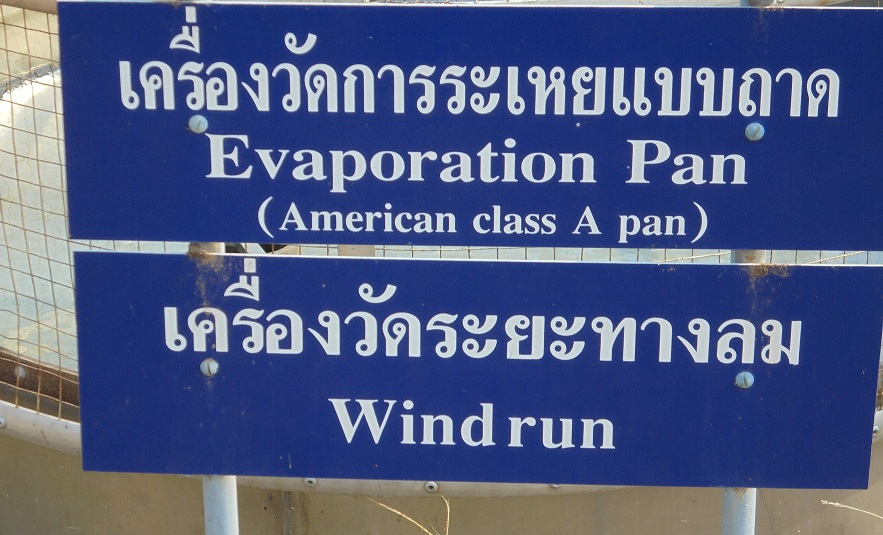

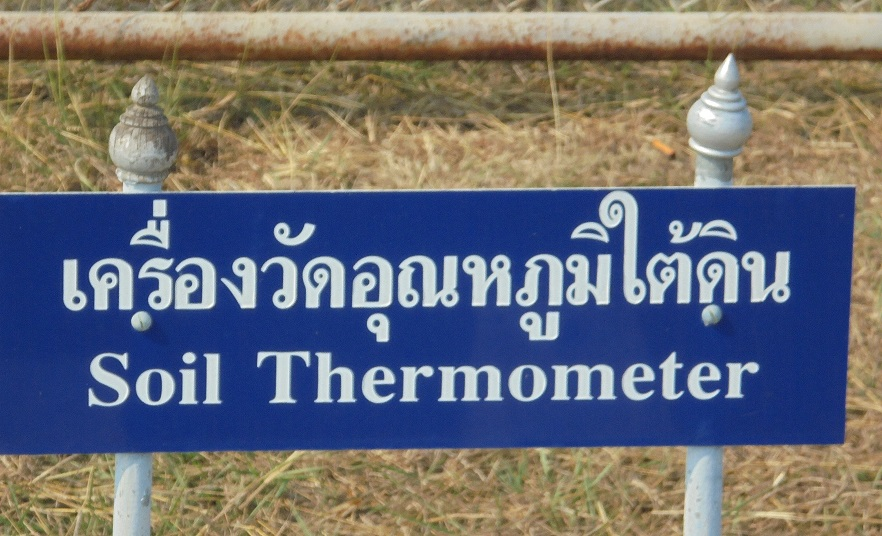

=== Weather forecasts northern Thailand ===
1. Mae Hong Son and Mae Sariang.
2. Chiang Mai and Doi Ang Khang.
3. Lamphun.
4. Chiang Rai and Chiang Rai Agromet.
5. Phayao.
6. Nan, Tha Wang Pha and Thung Chang.
7. Phrae.
8. Lampang, Thoen and Lampang Agromet.
9. Tak, Bhumibol dam, Doi Mu Soe A., Mae Sot and Umphang.
10. Kamphaeng Phet.
11. Sukhothai and Si Samrong Agromet.
12. Uttaradit.
13. Phitsanulok.
14. Phichit Agromet.
15. Phetchabun, Lom Sak and Wichian Buri.

== Notes ==
- In this overview of weather stations, an Agromet station is omitted if it is located close to TMD weather station.
