= Bang Mun Nak district =

District of Thailand

Bang Mun Nak บางมูลนาก
- District
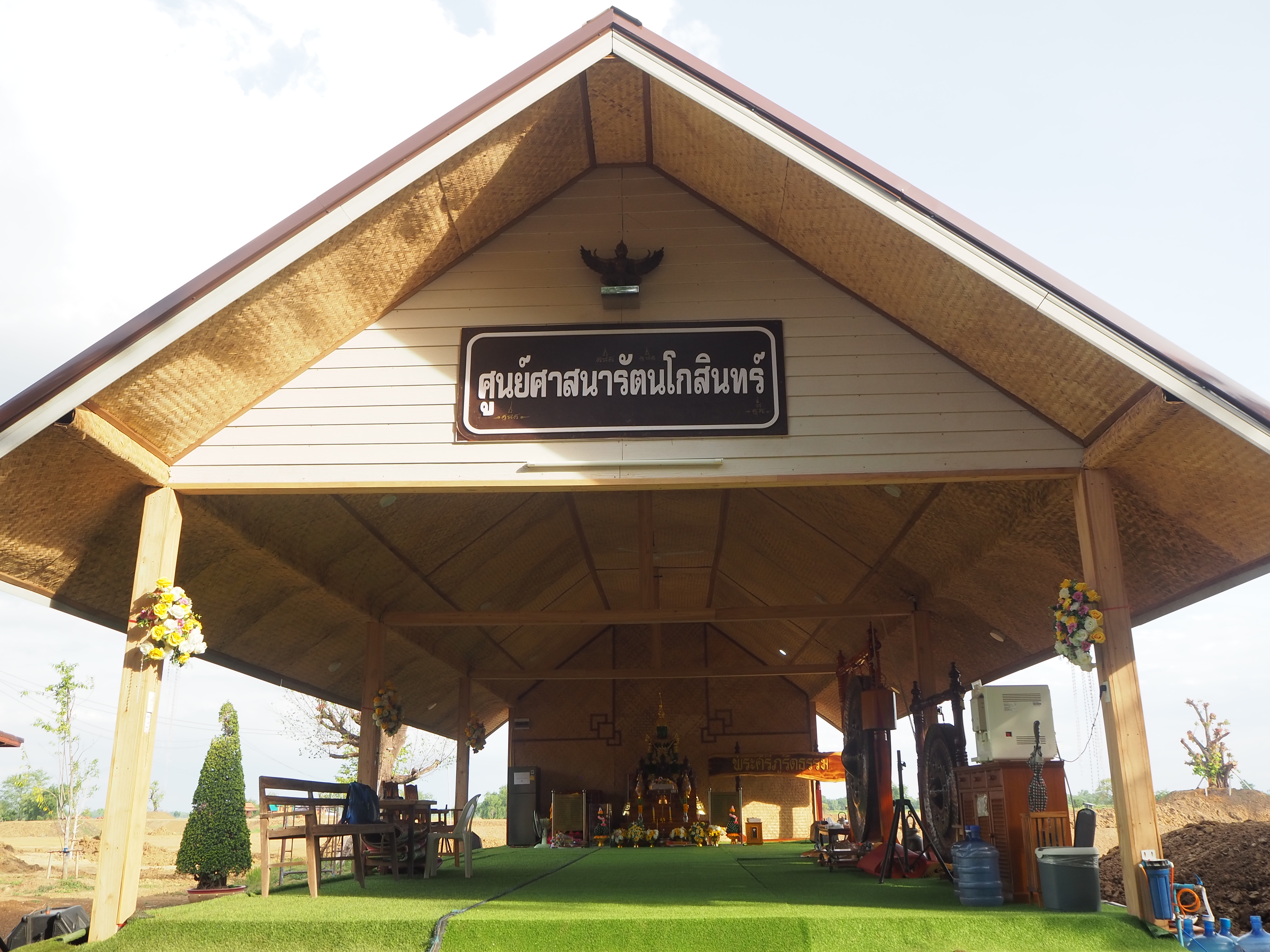
- Phra Si Phuri Tham House of Priest
- Nickname: Bang Nak
- District location in Phichit province
- Coordinates: 16°1′40″N 100°22′44″E
- Country: Thailand
- Province: Phichit

Area
  - Total: 377.7 km^{2} (145.8 sq mi)

Population (2005)
  - Total: 49,302
  - Density: 130.5/km^{2} (338/sq mi)
- Time zone: UTC+7 (ICT)
- Postal code: 66120
- Geocode: 6605

Bang Mun Nak (Thai: บางมูลนาก, pronounced [bāːŋ mūːn nâːk]) is a district (amphoe) in the southern part of Phichit province, central Thailand.

== History ==
Bang Mun Nak was the location of the Mueang Phum, an ancient town believed to be part of Phichit Province. In 1903, the province of Phichit was divided into three districts: Mueang Pichit, Bang Khlan, and Mueang Phum. In 1907, the district office moved to a new location on the west bank of the Nan River, north of Wat Bang Mun Nak temple under the name "Mueang Phum District". On 8 March 1916, the district name was changed to Bang Mun Nak and the district office was moved to the east bank of the river.

The name Bang Mun Nak means 'place of otter dung' because at Khlong Busabong (north of Bang Mun Nak market) there were many otters that defecated in the area, so it was called Bang Khi Nak, later changed to Bang Mun Nak. Bang Mun Nak is commonly referred to as Bang Nak by the locals.

== Geography ==
Neighboring districts are (from the west clockwise): Pho Thale, Taphan Hin, Thap Khlo, Dong Charoen of Phichit Province; Nong Bua and Chum Saeng of Nakhon Sawan province.

Bang Mun Nak is about 52 km (32 mi) south of Mueang Pichit.

== Administration ==
The district is divided into 10 sub-districts (tambons), which are further subdivided into 78 villages (mubans). Bang Mun Nak is a town (thesaban mueang) which covers tambon, Bang Mun Nak. There are two townships (thesaban tambons): Bang Phai and Wang Taku. Each cover parts of tambons with the same names. There are a further nine tambon administrative organizations (TAO).

No.	Name	Thai name	Villages	Pop.
1.	Bang Mun Nak	บางมูลนาก	-	9,240
2.	Bang Phai	บางไผ่	12	7,677
3.	Ho Krai	หอไกร	9	6,283
4.	Noen Makok	เนินมะกอก	12	7,420
5.	Wang Samrong	วังสำโรง	7	3,825
6.	Phum	ภูมิ	5	2,380
7.	Wang Krot	วังกรด	6	2,592
8.	Huai Khen	ห้วยเขน	5	1,729
9.	Wang Taku	วังตะกู	12	5,509
10.	Lam Prada	ลำประดา	10	2,647

Missing numbers are tambons which now form Dong Charoen District.

== Transportation ==
Bang Mun Nak is regarded as one of the three districts of Phichit, with a railroad running through (northern line). The district is served by the Bang Mun Nak railway station of the State Railway of Thailand (SRT).
