= Bueng Na Rang district =

Bueng Na Rang บึงนาราง
- Amphoe
- Amphoe location in Phichit province
- Coordinates: 16°10′18″N 100°7′36″E
- Country: Thailand
- Province: Phichit
- Seat: Huai Kaeo

Area
  - Total: 450.610 km^{2} (173.981 sq mi)

Population (2005)
  - Total: 28,277
  - Density: 62.3/km^{2} (161/sq mi)
- Time zone: UTC+7 (ICT)
- Postal code: 66130
- Geocode: 6610

Bueng Na Rang (Thai: บึงนาราง, pronounced [bɯ̄ŋ nāː rāːŋ]) is a district (amphoe) in the western part of Phichit province, central Thailand.

== Geography ==
Neighboring districts are (from the north clockwise) Pho Prathap Chang, Taphan Hin and Pho Thale of Phichit Province, Banphot Phisai of Nakhon Sawan province and Bueng Samakkhi of Kamphaeng Phet province.

== History ==
The minor district was established on 15 July 1996 by splitting off five tambon from Pho Thale district.

The Thai government on 15 May 2007 upgraded all 81 minor districts to full districts. With publication in the Royal Gazette on 24 August the upgrade became official .

== Administration ==
The district is divided into five sub-districts (tambon), which are further subdivided into 50 villages (muban). There are no municipal (thesaban) areas, and five tambon administrative organizations (TAO).

| No. | Name | Thai name | Villages | Pop. |
|---|---|---|---|---|
| 1. | Huai Kaeo | ห้วยแก้ว | 8 | 4,504 |
| 2. | Pho Sai Ngam | โพธิ์ไทรงาม | 9 | 4,137 |
| 3. | Laem Rang | แหลมรัง | 14 | 8,150 |
| 4. | Bang Lai | บางลาย | 9 | 6,538 |
| 5. | Bueng Na Rang | บึงนาราง | 10 | 4,948 |
