= Taphan Hin district =

Taphan Hin ตะพานหิน
- Amphoe
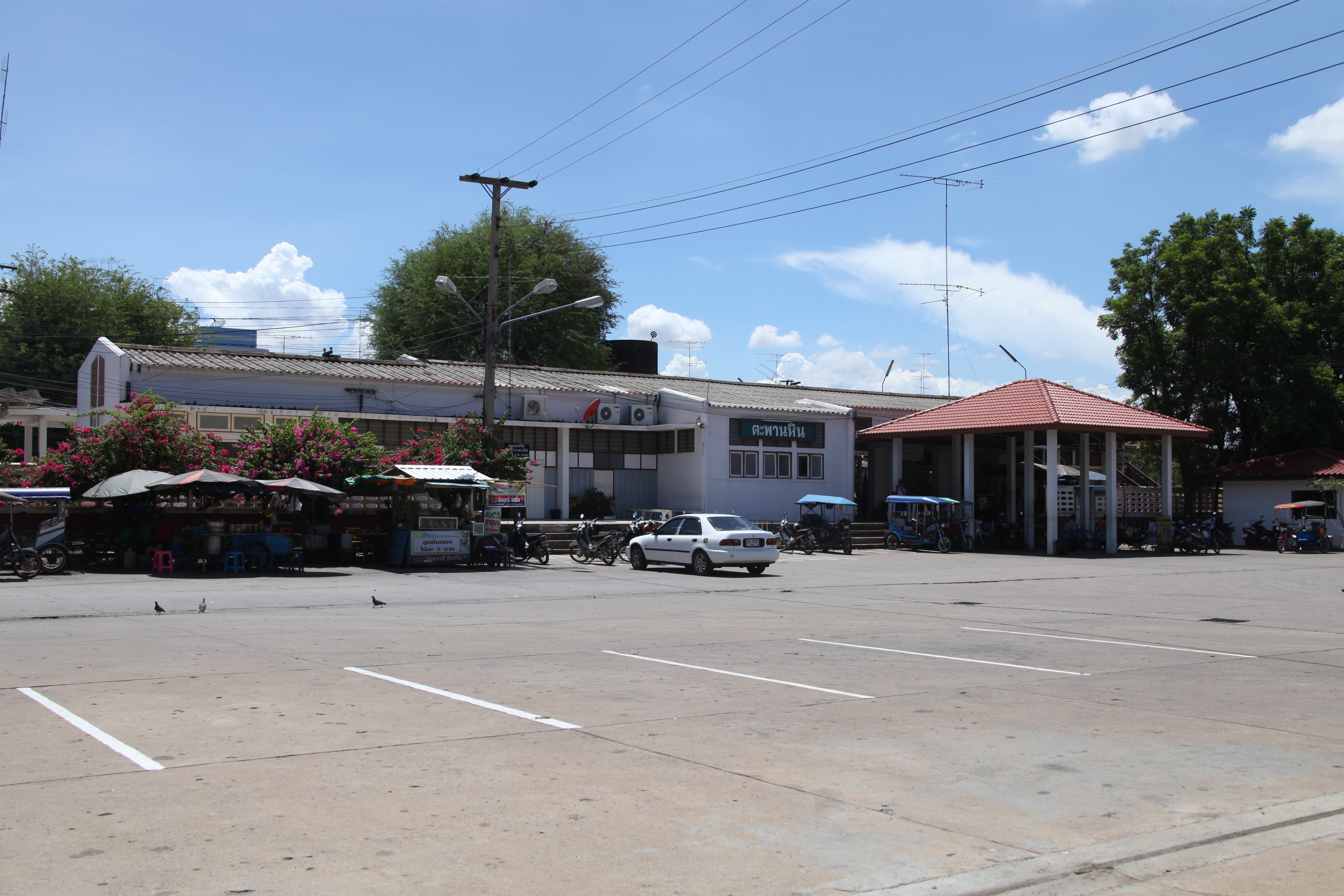
- Taphan Hin railway station

- Amphoe location in Phichit province
- Coordinates: 16°12′54″N 100°25′18″E
- Country: Thailand
- Province: Phichit
- Seat: Taphan Hin
- Amphoe established: 1937

Area
  - Total: 468.9303 km^{2} (181.0550 sq mi)

Population (2008)
  - Total: 70,573
  - Density: 152.1/km^{2} (394/sq mi)
- Time zone: UTC+7 (ICT)
- Postal code: 66110
- Geocode: 6604

Taphan Hin (Thai: ตะพานหิน, pronounced [tā.pʰāːn hǐn]) is a district (amphoe) in the central part of Phichit province, central Thailand.

== Geography ==
Neighboring districts are (from the east clockwise) Thap Khlo, Bang Mun Nak, Pho Thale, Bueng Na Rang, Pho Prathap Chang, Mueang Pichit and Wang Sai Phun of Phichit Province.

Taphan Hin is located on the eastern side of the Nan River, about 28 km (about 17 mi) south of Mueang Pichit.

== History ==
The minor district (king amphoe) Taphan Hin was created in 1937 as a subordinate of Mueang Phichit District by putting together the sub-districts Huai Ket from Mueang District, Thap Khlo and Khlong Khun from Bang Mun Nak District, and Wang Samrong from Pho Thale District. It was upgraded to a full district in 1940.

Taphan Hin is a small district that grew in importance after World War II.

The name "Taphan Hin" means "bridge stone". Because the northern area of market is about 1 km (0.621 mi) away from the center of district, there is a bedrock pushes out into the river like a bridge.

In 1962, a major fire broke out at the local market. As a result, although Taphan Hin is an old district with a traditional way of life, it has no century-old market like many other places.

== Administration ==
The district is divided into 13 sub-districts (tambon), which are further subdivided into 97 villages (muban). The town (thesaban mueang) Taphan Hin covers the whole tambon Taphan Hin. There are a further 13 tambon administrative organizations (TAO).

No.	Name	Thai	Pop.
1.	Taphan Hin	ตะพานหิน	-	16,388
2.	Ngio Rai	งิ้วราย	8	6,369
3.	Huai Ket	ห้วยเกตุ	11	5,596
4.	Sai Rong Khon	ไทรโรงโขน	4	1,465
5.	Nong Phayom	หนองพยอม	12	7,147
6.	Thung Pho	ทุ่งโพธิ์	7	2,062
7.	Dong Takhop	ดงตะขบ	10	3,499
8.	Khlong Khun	คลองคูณ	7	4,142
9.	Wang Samrong	วังสำโรง	7	5,977
10.	Wang Wa	วังหว้า	8	3,912
11.	Wang Lum	วังหลุม	10	7,203
12.	Thap Man	ทับหมัน	6	4,142
13.	Phai Luang	ไผ่หลวง	7	2,671

== Transportation ==
Taphan Hin is regarded as one of the three districts of Phichit, with a railroad running through (northern line). The district is served by the Taphan Hin railway station of the State Railway of Thailand (SRT).
