= Pho Thale district =

Pho Thale โพทะเล
- Amphoe
- Amphoe location in Phichit province
- Coordinates: 16°4′30″N 100°18′12″E
- Country: Thailand
- Province: Phichit
- Seat: Tha Bua

Area
  - Total: 484.4 km^{2} (187.0 sq mi)

Population (2009)
  - Total: 60,781
  - Density: 127.1/km^{2} (329/sq mi)
- Time zone: UTC+7 (ICT)
- Postal code: 66130
- Geocode: 6606

Pho Thale (Thai: โพทะเล, pronounced [pʰōː tʰā.lēː]) is a district (amphoe) in the southwestern part of Phichit province, central Thailand.

== Geography ==
Neighboring districts are (from the northwest clockwise) Bueng Na Rang, Taphan Hin, Bang Mun Nak of Phichit Province, Chum Saeng, Kao Liao and Banphot Phisai of Nakhon Sawan province.

== History ==
In 1939, the district office was moved from the Bang Khlan Sub-district to the Ban Tan Sub-district. Later the same year, the district was renamed from Bang Khlan to Pho Thale, and the sub-district Ban Tan also to Pho Thale.

== Administration ==
The district is divided into 11 sub-districts (tambon), which are further subdivided into 98 villages (muban). There are two sub-district municipalities (thesaban tambon) - Pho Thale covers parts of tambon Pho Thale, and Tha Sao parts of tambon Tha Sao and Tha Khamin. There are a further 11 tambon administrative organizations (TAO).

No.	Name	Thai	Villages	Pop.
1.	Pho Thale	โพทะเล	9	7,558
2.	Thai Nam	ท้ายน้ำ	11	5,786
3.	Thanong	ทะนง	11	7,863
4.	Tha Bua	ท่าบัว	13	7,033
5.	Thung Noi	ทุ่งน้อย	7	3,722
6.	Tha Khamin	ท่าขมิ้น	12	5,607
7.	Tha Sao	ท่าเสา	9	6,052
8.	Bang Khlan	บางคลาน	6	3,918
11.	Tha Nang	ท่านั่ง	6	3,889
12.	Ban Noi	บ้านน้อย	6	3,876
13.	Wat Khwang	วัดขวาง	8	5,477

Missing numbers are tambon which now form Bueng Narang district.
