= Thap Khlo district =

Thap Khlo ทับคล้อ
- Amphoe
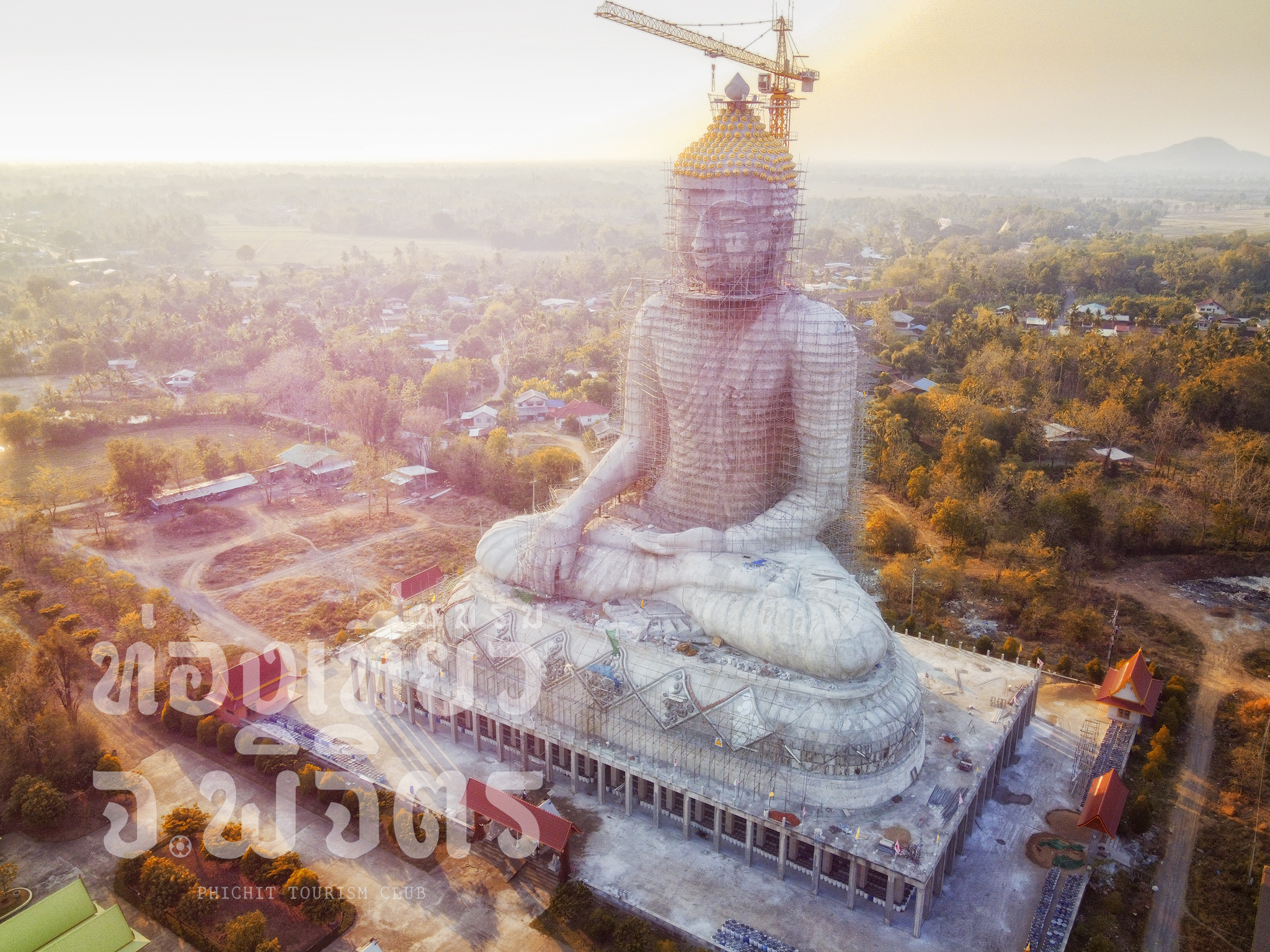
- Phra Phuttha Metta, the big Buddha image of Wat Thap Khlo

- Amphoe location in Phichit province
- Coordinates: 16°9′42″N 100°35′48″E
- Country: Thailand
- Province: Phichit
- Seat: Thap Khlo

Area
  - Total: 378.287 km^{2} (146.057 sq mi)

Population (2005)
  - Total: 46,377
  - Density: 122.6/km^{2} (318/sq mi)
- Time zone: UTC+7 (ICT)
- Postal code: 66150
- Geocode: 6608

Thap Khlo (Thai: ทับคล้อ, pronounced [tʰáp kʰlɔ́ː]) is a district (amphoe) in the eastern part of Phichit province, central Thailand.

== Geography ==
Neighboring districts are (from the south clockwise) Dong Charoen, Bang Mun Nak, Taphan Hin and Wang Sai Phun of Phichit Province, Noen Maprang of Phitsanulok province, Wang Pong and Chon Daen of Phetchabun province.

In terms of geography, Thap Khlo is also the only district in Phichit that has mountain and community forest, which is part of the national park. Therefore, Thap Khlo is the only district where giant krajiao plants (Curcuma latifolia) grow, especially in the community forests of the Khao Chet Luk sub-district.

== History ==
On 1 May 1983 the minor district (king amphoe) Thap Khlo was established as a subordinate of Taphan Hin district, from which four tambon were split off. On 13 August 1987 it was upgraded to a full district.

== Economy ==
Khao Chet Luk in the Thap Khlo district is the site of Thailand's largest gold mine, the Chatree Mining Complex. Akara Resources PCL, a Thai-Australian firm, owns and operates the mine. Akara is a subsidiary of Australian company, Kingsgate Consolidated Ltd. The complex includes the Chatree South ore field, which began commercial production in November 2001, and the Chatree North ore field, which began production in November 2008. The complex also includes processing plants. In 2015, the mine produced and exported four tonnes (4,000 kg) of gold. In May 2016, the Thai government announced that the Chatree mine would be closed at the end of 2016 due to environmental concerns. The mine has long been accused by local residents of poisoning residents, crops, and livestock. In January 2015 a government investigation team said that more than 300 neighboring villagers had tested positive for arsenic and manganese.

Akara has asked the government to review its decision. The company was surprised that the cabinet adopted the resolution to close the mine given that a panel set up by the Ministry of Industry has not yet completed its investigation into pollution and health complaints. The panel, set up in 2015, is composed of state agencies, affected villagers, academics, environmentalists, and Akara representatives. The company claims that there is no conclusive link between the heavy metals and illnesses claimed by some villagers. Blood tests on 1,004 residents in 14 communities living around the mining sites in 2014 and 2015 found that 42 percent of residents had high levels of manganese in their blood. In July 2018, the committee looking into the case confirmed that toxic leaks have emanated from tailing storage at the mine. Evidence of leakage into nearby rice fields and an observation well were also confirmed.

Kingsgate will seek a settlement through arbitration procedures under the Australia-Thailand Free Trade Agreement "in order to recover the substantial losses that it has suffered, and continue to suffer, as a result of the measures taken by the Thai government."

== Administration ==
The district is divided into four sub-districts (tambon), which are further subdivided into 57 villages (muban). There are two townships (thesaban tambon), Thap Khlo and Khao Sai. Both cover parts of their respective tambons. There are a further four tambon administrative organizations (TAO).

No.	Name	Thai name	Villages	Pop.
1.	Thap Khlo	ทับคล้อ	11	15,820
2.	Khao Sai	เขาทราย	14	14,600
3.	Khao Chet Luk	เขาเจ็ดลูก	13	7,682
4.	Thai Thung	ท้ายทุ่ง	19	8,275
