= Krai Thong =

Thai folktale

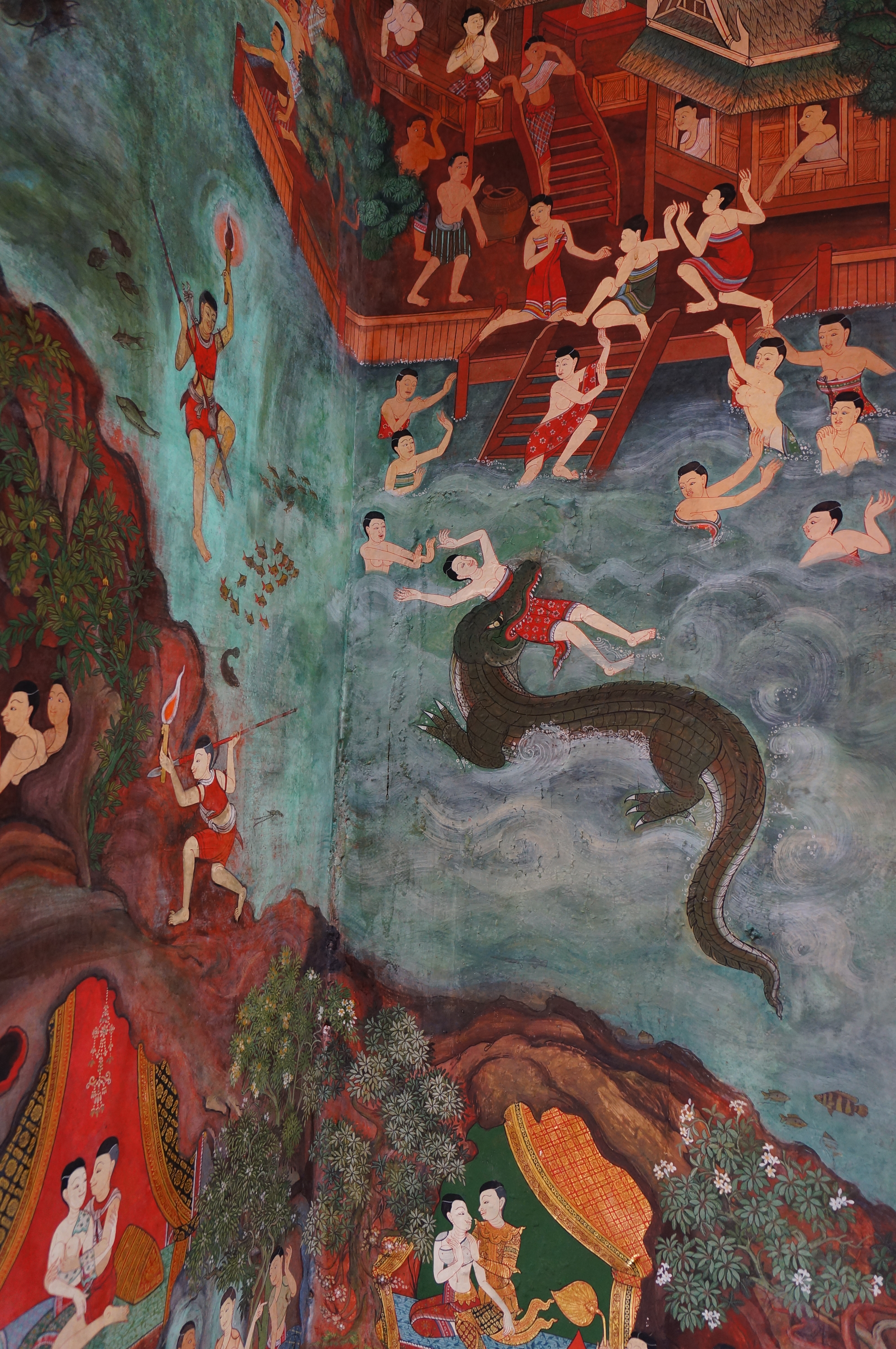
A mural painting depicting the story of Kraithong, from Wat Amphawan Chetiyaram in Samut Songkhram Province.

Krai Thong or Kraithong (Thai: ไกรทอง, pronounced [krāj.tʰɔ̄ːŋ]) is a Thai folktale, originating from Phichit Province. It tells the story of Chalawan, a crocodile lord who abducts a daughter of a wealthy Phichit man, and Kraithong, a merchant from Nonthaburi who seeks to kill Chalawan. The story was adapted into a play (lakhon nok), credited to King Rama II (r. 1809–1824), and has seen various modern adaptations.

== Synopsis ==
Once upon a time, there was a magical kingdom located deep inside an underwater cave where crocodiles live. Inside the cave, a magic crystal ball floated above, shining as bright as sunlight during daytime. The crocodile lord who ruled this cave, Chalawan (ชาละวัน), was named after the cave. Every crocodile that entered the cave changed to human form and needed no food.

Chalawan gained his position from his grandfather, after his father's death in a fight with two other crocodiles. He had two crocodile wives living with him in the underwater cave. With his aggressive nature and his need for superiority, what he had was not enough. He wanted to eat human flesh, unlike his grandfather, who lived by the Buddhist precepts.

In Phichit, there were rumors that crocodiles had been hunting people who lived near the canal. One day, two daughters of a wealthy Phichit man called Tapao Kaew (ตะเภาแก้ว) and Tapao Thong (ตะเภาทอง) wanted to play in the canal. They did not listen to their father's warning and went in the water. Chalawan, who came out of his cave in the crocodile form to prey on humans, saw the two daughters and fell in love. He then abducted Tapao Thong and took her down into his cave.

When Tapao Thong woke up in the cave, she was amazed by the beauty inside. Chalawan, in the handsome human form, tried to make Tapao Thong fall in love with him. However, he did not succeed. Chalawan then cast a spell on Tapao Thong that she would fall in love with him and agree to be his wife.

Meanwhile, when the wealthy man discovered that one of his daughters got attacked by a crocodile, he was in great sorrow. He announced that anyone who could defeat the crocodile and bring back his daughter's body would be rewarded with great treasures and the marriage with his second daughter, Tapao Kaew. However, not a man could defeat Chalawan.

Krai Thong, a fine man from Nonthaburi, was trained to defeat crocodiles and had mastered the skills. He volunteered to defeat Chalawan and bring back Tapao Thong. He travelled from Nonthaburi to Phichit ready to fight Chalawan with a magical spear given to him by his teacher Khong.

Before the arrival of Krai Thong, Chalawan dreamed about his death. He informed his grandfather about what he dreamt. That dream was a prophecy. His grandfather told Chalawan to remain in the cave for seven days. If Chalawan went out of the cave, he would face a fatal threat.

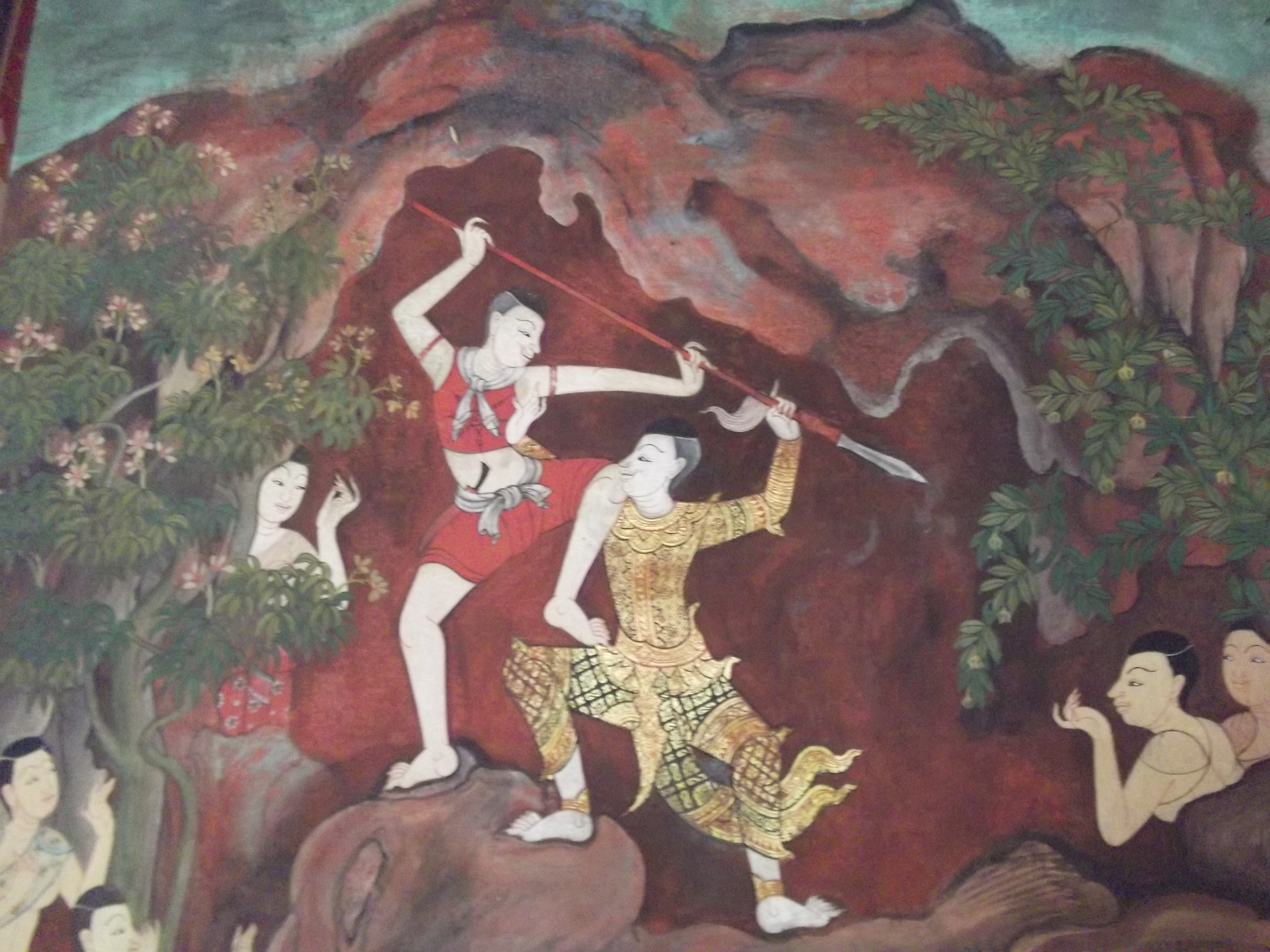
A mural painting depicting Krai Thong fighting with Chalawan

The next morning, Krai Thong started casting his spells on a raft floating above Chalawan's cave. The spell cast by Krai Thong reached Chalawan, the crocodile lord started to feel impatient and could not remain in his cave. Chalawan swam to the surface and confronted Krai Thong. The battle started immediately, Krai Thong attacked first by stabbing Chalawan in the back with his spear.

Chalawan who was badly wounded retreated to his cave. Both of his crocodile wives asked for help from his grandfather, however, his grandfather could not help. Krai Thong dove into the water and followed Chalawan down to his cave. When he arrived, he met Vimala (วิมาลา), one of the crocodile lord's wives. Krai Thong seduced her, and followed a fleeing Vimala into the cave.

Once inside the cave Krai Thong found a wounded Chalawan in human form. The battle between the two started again. Chalawan could not fight Krai Thong and was defeated. Krai Thong finally killed Chalawan and returned to the surface with Tapao Thong. Tapao Thong then returned to her father who was happy to see his daughter still alive. Krai Thong was rewarded with great treasures and was married to both daughters from that family.

== Krai Thong in popular media ==
Krai Thong (1958) - movie
Starring Adul Dulyarat as Krai Thong, Chana Sri-ubon as Chalawan, Sawalee Pakaphan, Prapapan Nakthong, Wongthong Planuson, and Kaekhai Suriya. Narration by Rujira Marnsri.
Chalawan (1972) - movie
First movie of Chaiyo film by Sompote Saengduenchai. Starring Prida Chulamonthon as Krai Thong, and Darm Dasakorn as Chalawan.
Krai Thong (1980) - movie
Another movie of the story Krai Thong by Chaiyo film. Main actors are Soraphong Chatree as Krai Thong, Sombat Metanee as Chalawan, Aranya Namwong as Vimala, and Ampha Phusit as Tapao Kaew.
Krai Thong 2 (1985) - Sequel from the previous movie
Krai Thong (1995) - Channel 7 TV drama
Actors starring are Chatmongkol Bumpen as Chalawan, Sippanont Kotchakorn as Krai Thong, Thitiya Noppongsakij as Tapao Thong, and Sudthida Harnthanorm as Tapao Kaew
Krai Thong (2001) - movie
A remake of Krai Thong story, directed by Suthas Intranupakorn. Main actors are Winai Kraibutr, Wannasa Thongwiset, Praifah Sirivicha, Chanpen Intrajak, and Chutima Every
The Man Whos Krai Thong (2022) - Channel 7 TV Drama
A remake of Krai Thong starring Mit Mitchai as Chalawan, Isabelle Kopitet as Tapao Thong, Surasak Suwannawong as Kri Thong
Love of the Two Realms (2024) - Channel 8 TV Drama
Based on the Krai Thong folklore. Stars Thitiwat Ritprasert as Chalawan, Anuwat Choocherdratana as Krai Thong, Preechaya Pongthananikorn as Taphaothong, and Atcharee Buakhiao as Taphaokaew

== Cultural significance ==
Krai Thong is a real figure, however he has no magical power like in the story. He was from Nonthaburi and worked as a merchant and a crocodile hunter. After the locals from Nonthaburi Province heard about Krai Thong’s heroism, they established a temple for his courageous act. The temple is called Wat Bang Krai Nai, located near the area of Krai Thong's old village.

The story also reflects how Thai people in old times had a strong relationship with animals. They believed that crocodiles and humans can have relationships and crocodiles do have feelings like humans.

The yellow dwarf star 47 Ursae Majoris (Chalawan) and the extinct reptile Chalawan are both named after the Character in the story.
