= Phichit province =

Province of Thailand

Coordinates: 16°26′38″N 100°20′52″E

Phichit พิจิตร
- Province
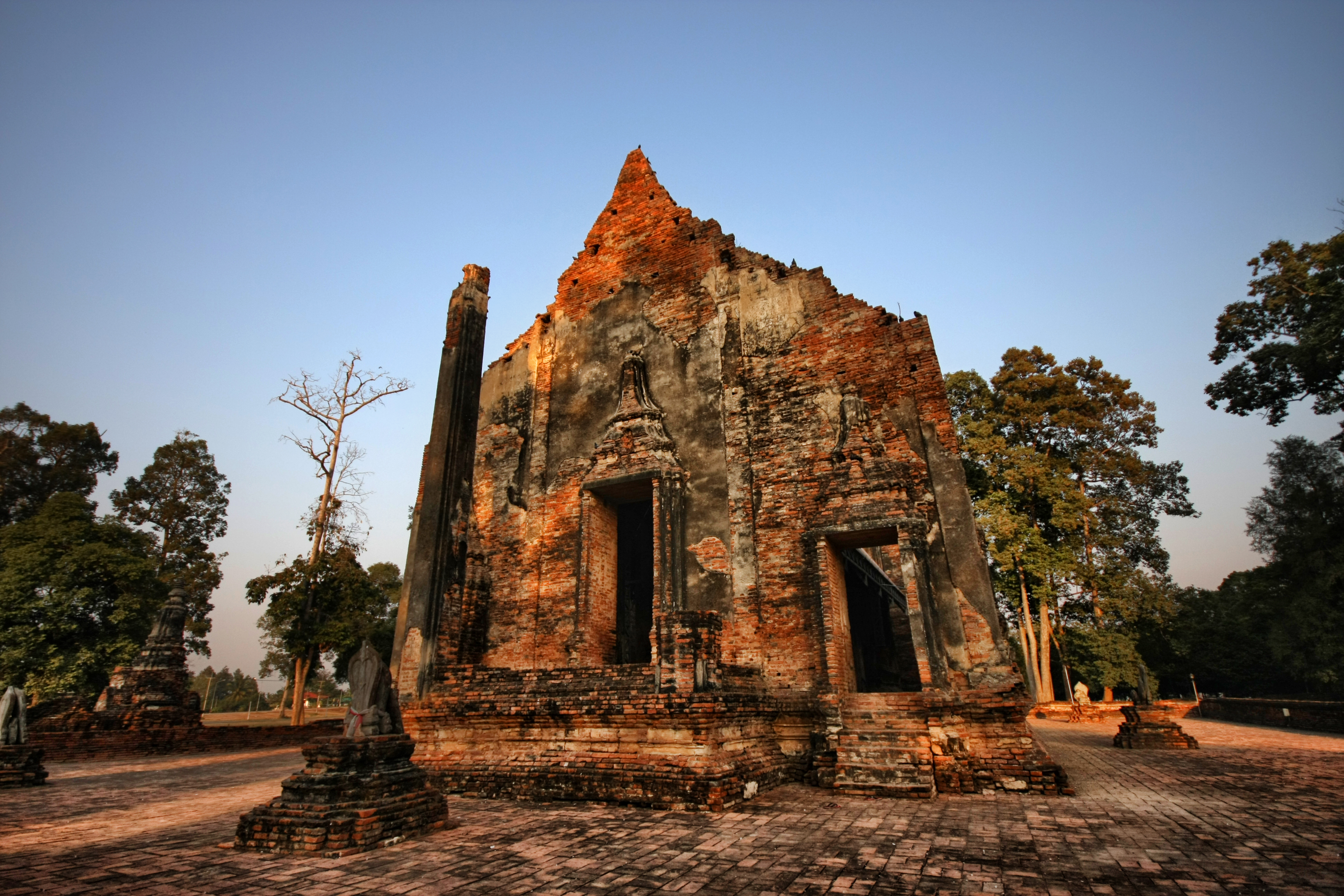
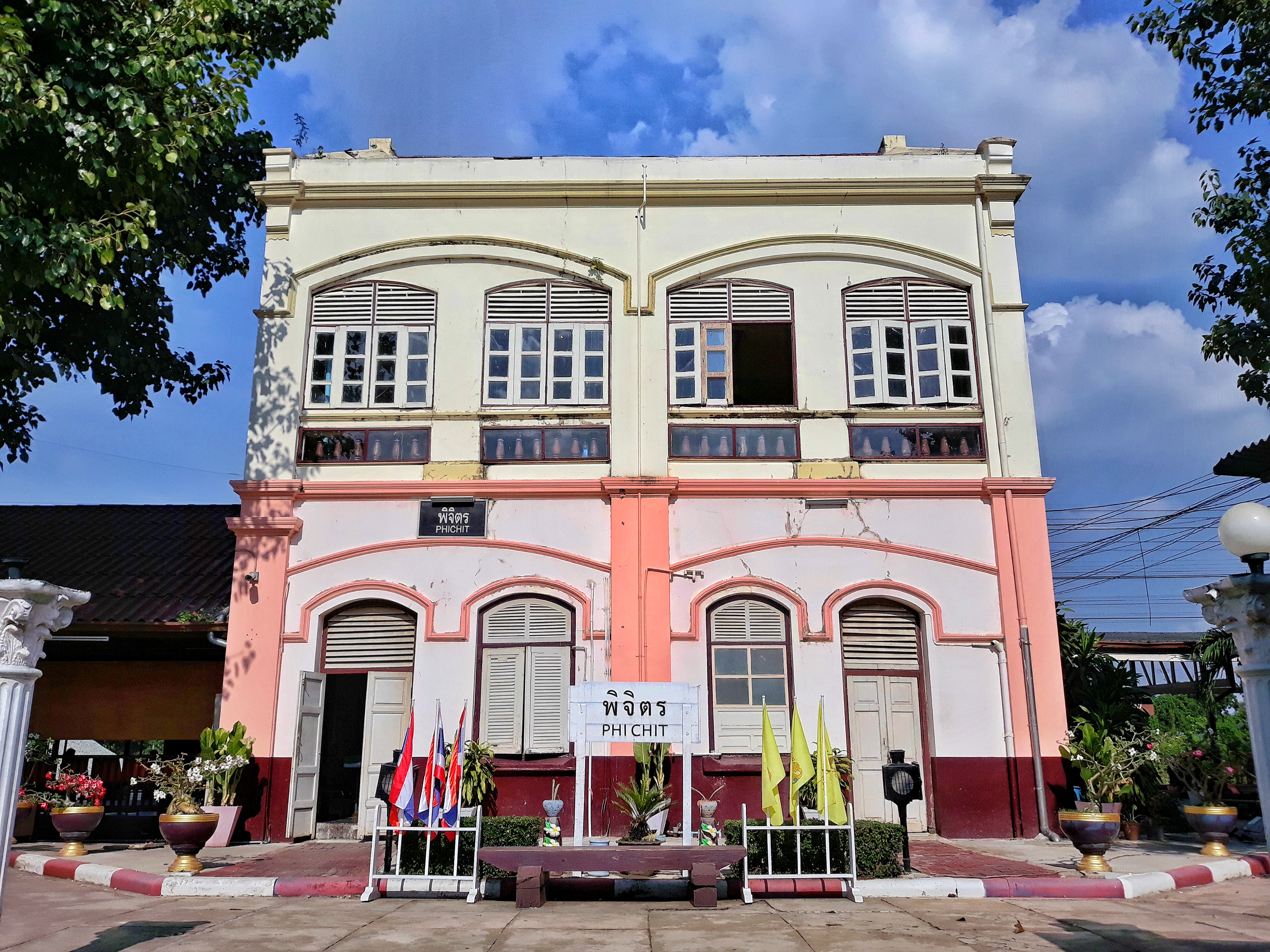
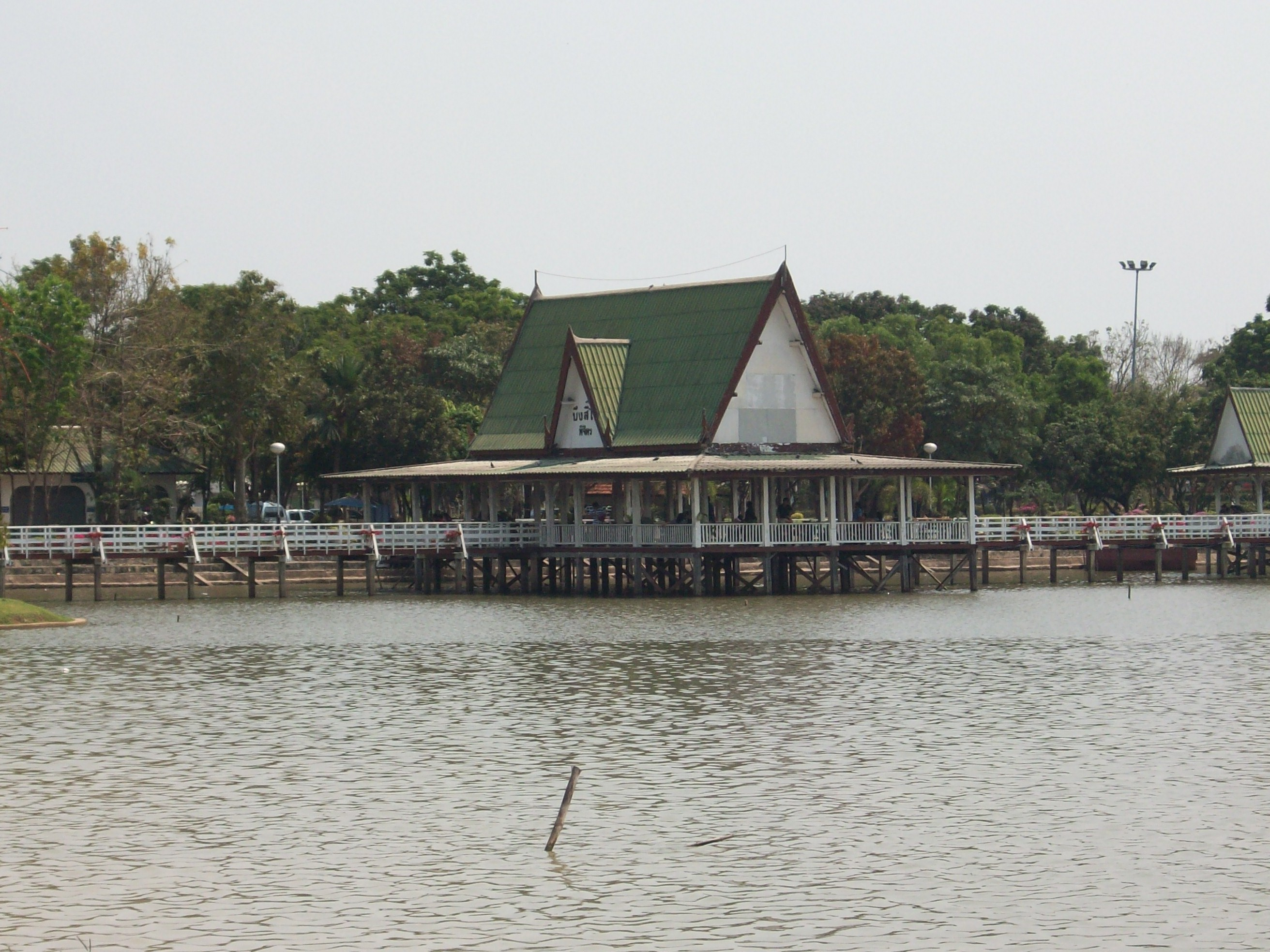
- From top: Wat Pho Prathap Chang, an ancient temple in Pho Prathap Chang district, believed to be the birthplace of the Luang Sorasak who later became a King of Ayutthaya, Phichit railway station stands out with its historic beautiful neoclassical building from the reign of King Rama V, Bueng Si Fai

- Flag Seal
- Nickname: Mueang Chalawan (city of Chalawan)
- Mottoes: ถิ่นประสูติพระเจ้าเสือ แข่งเรือยาวประเพณี พระเครื่องดีหลวงพ่อเงิน เพลิดเพลินบึงสีไฟ ศูนย์รวมใจหลวงพ่อเพชร รสเด็ดส้มท่าข่อย ข้าวเจ้าอร่อยลือเลื่อง ตำนานเมืองชาละวัน ("Hometown of Phra Chao Suea. The long boat racing festival. Superb amulets of Luang Pho Ngoen. Delightful Bueng Si Fai. Unified by Luang Pho Phet. Tasty Tha Khoi pomelos. Delicious and famed rice. The legend of Chalawan city.")
- Map of Thailand highlighting Phichit province
- Country: Thailand
- Capital: Phichit

Government
  - Type: Province and Provincial Administrative Organization
  - Body: Phichit Province and Phichit Provincial Administrative Organization
  - Governor: Thaneeya Naipinit
  - PAO Chief Executive: Krit Pensupa

Area
  - Total: 4,319 km^{2} (1,668 sq mi)
  - Rank: 51st

Population (2024)
  - Total: ▼517,308
  - Rank: 51st
  - Density: 120/km^{2} (310/sq mi)
  - Rank: 40th

Human Achievement Index
  - HAI (2022): 0.6247 "low" Ranked 62nd

GDP
  - Total: baht 45 billion (US$1.6 billion) (2019)
- Time zone: UTC+7 (ICT)
- Postal code: 66xxx
- Calling code: 055 & 056
- ISO 3166 code: TH-66
- Vehicle registration: พิจิตร
- Website: phichit.go.th phichitpao.go.th

Phichit (Thai: พิจิตร, pronounced [pʰí(ʔ).t͡ɕìt], lit. 'beautiful') is one of Thailand's seventy-six provinces (changwat). It lies in lower northern Thailand and 330 km due north of Bangkok. Neighbouring provinces are (from north clockwise) Phitsanulok, Phetchabun, Nakhon Sawan, and Kamphaeng Phet.

== Geography ==
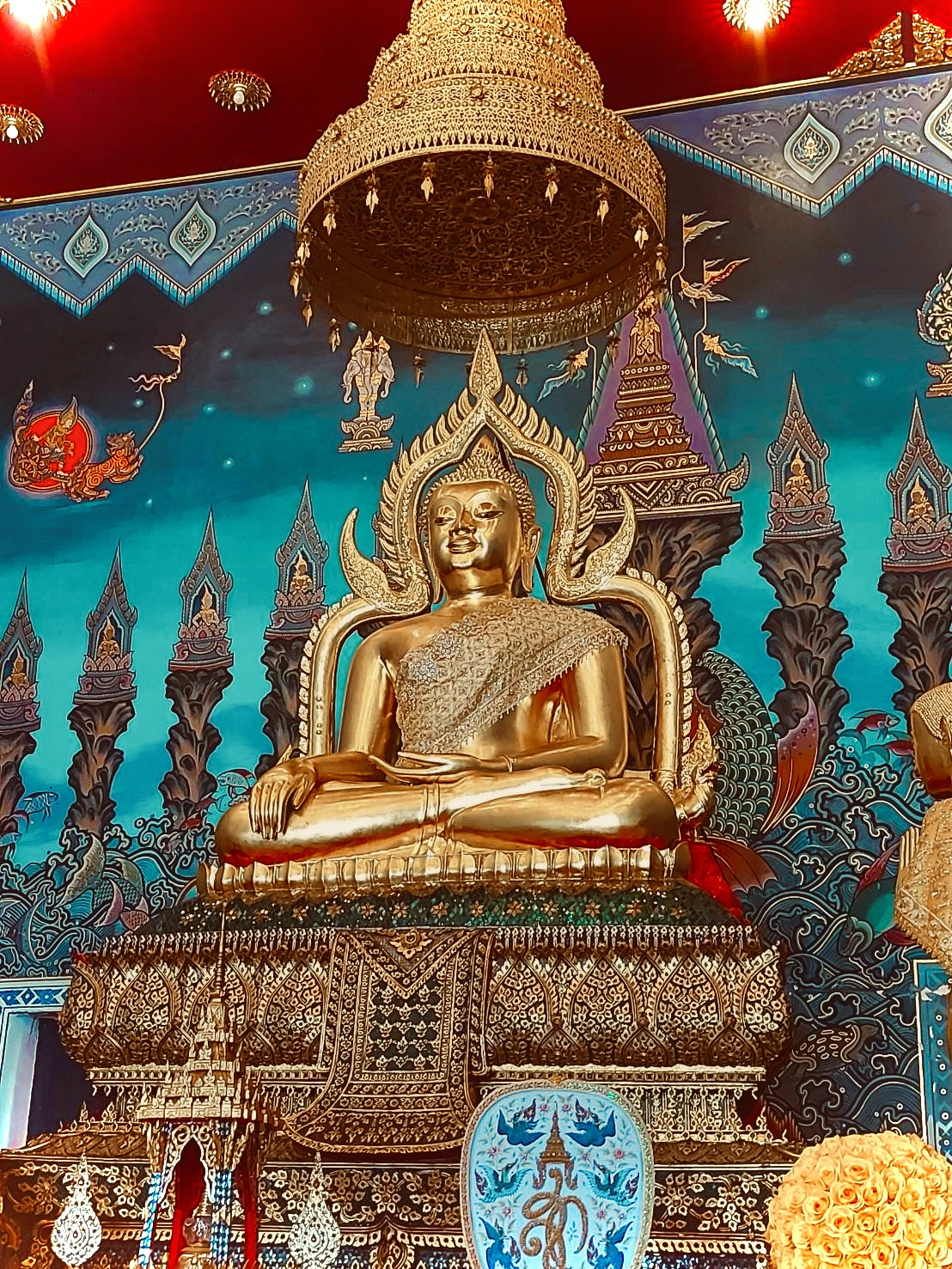
Luang Pho Phet, Wat Tha Luang

The Nan and Yom Rivers flow through Phichit province, joining shortly before the Chao Phraya is formed. The province mainly consists of low fertile river plains, making rice and lotus the main crops. The total forest area is just 17 km^{2} (6.6 sq mi) or 0.4 percent of provincial area.

=== Climate ===
Phichit province has a tropical savanna climate (Köppen climate classification category Aw). Winters are dry and warm. Temperatures rise until August. Monsoon season runs from April through October, with heavy rain. Climate statistics according to the Agromet station Phichit: maximum temperature is 39.4 °C (102.9 °F) in April and lowest temperature is 15.2 °C (59.4 °F) in January. The highest average temperature is 36.9 °C (98.4 °F) in March and the minimum average temperature is 19.9 °C (67.8 °F) in November. The average relative humidity is 74.6%. Annual rainfall is 1,309.5 millimetres (51.56 in). The number of rainy days was 120 days for a year.

Climate data for Phichit (2021–2022)
Month	Jan	Feb	Mar	Apr	May	Jun	Jul	Aug	Sep	Oct	Nov	Dec	Year
Record high °C (°F)	35.0 (95.0)	37.1 (98.8)	39.1 (102.4)	39.4 (102.9)	38.5 (101.3)	38.4 (101.1)	38.6 (101.5)	37.6 (99.7)	35.3 (95.5)	34.9 (94.8)	35.4 (95.7)	34.2 (93.6)	39.4 (102.9)
Mean daily maximum °C (°F)	32.8 (91.0)	33.7 (92.7)	36.9 (98.4)	36.3 (97.3)	36.2 (97.2)	34.8 (94.6)	34.0 (93.2)	34.8 (94.6)	32.4 (90.3)	32.6 (90.7)	33.3 (91.9)	31.4 (88.5)	34.1 (93.4)
Daily mean °C (°F)	24.9 (76.8)	27.2 (81.0)	30.7 (87.3)	29.8 (85.6)	31.5 (88.7)	30.4 (86.7)	29.7 (85.5)	30.1 (86.2)	28.7 (83.7)	28.8 (83.8)	28.7 (83.7)	25.6 (78.1)	28.8 (83.9)
Mean daily minimum °C (°F)	20.5 (68.9)	22.0 (71.6)	24.5 (76.1)	25.2 (77.4)	25.6 (78.1)	25.2 (77.4)	25.4 (77.7)	24.9 (76.8)	25.1 (77.2)	24.2 (75.6)	19.9 (67.8)	20.6 (69.1)	23.6 (74.5)
Record low °C (°F)	15.2 (59.4)	18.4 (65.1)	21.2 (70.2)	21.5 (70.7)	23.1 (73.6)	23.4 (74.1)	23.7 (74.7)	23.8 (74.8)	22.8 (73.0)	22.1 (71.8)	20.9 (69.6)	15.6 (60.1)	15.2 (59.4)
Average rainfall mm (inches)	65.5 (2.58)	20.7 (0.81)	148.7 (5.85)	230.6 (9.08)	90.7 (3.57)	157.2 (6.19)	227.0 (8.94)	292.9 (11.53)	407.0 (16.02)	120.8 (4.76)	1.0 (0.04)	—	1,309.5 (51.56)
Average rainy days	8	4	7	14	16	15	21	22	22	17	3	—	120
Average relative humidity (%)	69.0	73.1	71.6	74.5	76.0	77.9	79.0	80.1	82.1	80.0	73.8	71.2	74.6

== History ==
The town of Phichit was established in 1058 by Phraya Kotabongthevaraja (พระยาโคตระบอง), and was first part of the Sukhothai Kingdom, and later of Ayutthaya. Piset Jiachanpong reads Phichit instead as one of a set of Ayutthayan foundations planted against Sukhothai's towns, this one beside Yan Yao, as Kamphaeng Phet was placed opposite Nakhon Chum and Chainat opposite Song Khwae. Srisak Vallibhotama counts Phichit among the seven modern provinces that covered the core of Sukhothai. An old temple in Pho Prathap Chang District is Wat Pho Prathap Chang (วัดโพธิ์ประทับช้าง). It was built by Phra Chao Suea, an Ayutthaya king, in 1701 at a site reputed to be his birthplace. The site is surrounded by double-walls and huge trees, some of which are over 200 years old.

The name of the main city changed several times. At first it was called Sa Luang ('city of the royal pond'). In Ayutthaya times it was called Okhaburi ('city in the swamp'), and then finally Phichit ('beautiful city').

== Symbols ==
The provincial seal shows a pond, which refers to the old name of Phichit, Mueang Sa Luang ('city of the royal pond'). The banyan tree in front refers to Wat Pho Prathap Chang. The temple was built in 1669–1671 by King Luang Sorasak, who was born in the village of Pho Prathap Chang, between a banyan and a sacred fig.

The flag of Phichit shows the circular provincial seal in the middle. It has three green bars and two white horizontal bars, with the middle bar being interrupted by the seal.

The provincial tree is the ironwood. The provincial flower is the lotus. The provincial aquatic animal is the Siamese crocodile.

The provincial motto (loosely translated) states as follows:

"Hometown of Phra Chao Suea. The long boat racing festival. Superb amulets of Luang Pho Ngoen. Delightful Bueng Si Fai. Unified by Luang Pho Phet. Tasty Tha Khoi pomelos. Delicious and famed rice. The legend of Chalawan city."

== Demographics ==
=== Population ===
Population history of Phichit province is as follows:

1947	1960	1970	1980	1990	2000	2011	2020
237,241	389,000	440,000	534,481	558,818	572,989	549,688	532,310

=== Religion ===
There are total 482 Theravada Buddhist temples in the province, of which 478 Maha Nikai and 4 Dhammayut temples.

62	Mueang Phichit	48	Bang Mun Nak	34	Sam Ngam	28	Wang Sai Phun
58	Taphan Hin	45	Pho Thale	32	Bueng Na Rang	25	Dong Charoen
53	Pho Pratab Chang	45	Tap Khlo	31	Vajirabarami	21	Sak Lek

There are fourteen Christian churches and one Mosque.

== Administrative divisions ==
Map of 12 districts

The province is divided into 12 districts (amphoes). These are further divided into 89 subdistricts (tambons) and 852 villages (mubans).

1. Mueang Phichit
2. Wang Sai Phun
3. Pho Prathap Chang
4. Taphan Hin
5. Bang Mun Nak
6. Pho Thale
7. Sam Ngam
8. Thap Khlo
9. Sak Lek
10. Bueng Na Rang
11. Dong Charoen
12. Vajirabarami

=== Local government ===
As of 26 November 2019 there are: one Phichit Provincial Administration Organisation (ongkan borihan suan changwat) and 28 municipal (thesaban) areas in the province. Phichit, Taphan Hin and Bang Mun Nak have town (thesaban mueang) status. There are a further 25 subdistrict municipalities (thesaban tambon). The non-municipal areas are administered by 73 Subdistrict Administrative Organisations (SAO) (ongkan borihan suan tambon).

== Education ==
Educational institutions from kindergarten to higher education in Phicht province is as follows:

=== Higher education ===
There is one higher education institute in the province with 2,279 students:

=== Vocational education ===
- Total five vocational colleges with 4,305 students.

=== Secondary education ===
- Total 35 upper secondary schools with 10,546 students.
- Total 90 lower secondary schools with 17,137 students.

=== Primary education ===
- Total 184 primary schools with 31,258 pupils.

== Health ==
=== Government hospitals ===
There are twelve government hospitals in Phichit province, of which Mueang Phichit district has one general hospital:

- Phichit Hospital with 400 beds.

The other eleven districts have a community hospital:

Bang Mun Nak Hospital	large community hospital	90 beds
Taphan Hin Hospital	large community hospital	90 beds
Pho Thale Hospital	medium community hospital	45 beds
Pho Pratab Chang Hospital	small community hospital	30 beds
Sam Ngam Hospital	small community hospital	30 beds
Wachirabarami Hospital	small community hospital	30 beds
Wang Sai Phun Hospital	small community hospital	30 bed
Thap Khlo Hospital	small community hospital	28 beds
Bueng Na Rang Hospital	small community hospital	24 beds
Dong Charoen Hospital	small community hospital	22 beds

=== Private hospitals ===
There are four private hospitals in Phichit province, all are in Mueang Phichit district:

- Chaiaroon Vechagarn Hospital with 108 beds
- Pitsanuvej Hospital Phichit with 90 beds
- Srisukho health Centre with 10 beds
- Thatsanavet Hospital with 10 beds

=== Health promoting hospitals ===
There are total 109 health-promoting hospitals in the province, of which: 17 in Mueang Phichit, 13 in Thaphan Hin, 12 in Bang Mun Nak, 10 in Pho Pratab Chang, 10 in Pho Thale, 8 in Thap Khlo, 7 in Sam Ngam, 7 in Vajirabarami, 7 in Wang Sai Phun, 6 in Bueng Na Rang, 6 in Dong Charoen, 6 in Sak Lek.

=== Clinics ===
Around 210 clinics are in Phichit province, of which 78 clinics (37%) in Mueang Phichit, 27 Taphan Hin, 24 Bang Mun Nak, 18 Pho Thale, 17 Pho Prathab Chang, 10 Dong Charoen, 8 Thap Khlo, 7 Sak Lek, 6 Sam Ngam, 6 Vajirabarami, 5 Bueng Na Rang and 4 Wang Sai Phun.

== Economy ==
=== Economic output ===
In 2021, Phichit province had an economic output of 47.643 billion baht (US$1.489 billion). This amounts to per capita gross provincial product (GPP) of 93,950 baht (US$2,900). In 2023 the total workforce was 285,854 of which 281,648 persons were employed in economic activity. In agriculture and fishery 123,346 persons (43.8%) were employed and in the non-agricultural sector 158,302 persons (56.2%).

Gross Provincial Product (GPP)
	Activities	Baht	Percent
1	Agriculture + fishery	17,959,000,000	37.7
2	Trade	6,911,000,000	14.5
3	Manufacturing	4,639,000,000	9.7
4	Education	3,202,000,000	6.7
5	Finance	2,996,000,000	6.3
6	Human health	2,034,000,000	4.3
7	Real estate	1,814,000,000	3.8
8	Construction	1,766,000,000	3.7
9	Defence / publ.admin.	1,766,000,000	3.7
10	Energy	1,032,000,000	2.2
11	Transportation	798,000,000	1.7
12	Water supply	791,000,000	1.7
13	Information	644,000,000	1.4
14	Other service activity	417,000,000	0.9
15	Accommodation / food	274,000,000	0.6
16	Pastime	227,000,000	0.5
17	Scientific activity	152,000,000	0.3
18	Administration	45,000,000	0.1
	Total	47,643,000,000	100

Employed persons
	Activities	Workforce	Percent
1	Agriculture and fishery	123,346	43.8
2	Trade	56,288	20.0
3	Manufacturing	24,142	8.6
4	Defence and publ.admin.	17,332	6.1
5	Accommodation and food	16,060	5.7
6	Construction	11,756	4.2
7	Education	8,606	3.0
8	Human health	6,207	2.2
9	Other service activity	4,822	1.7
10	Transportation	4,086	1.4
11	Administration	3,319	1.2
12	Finance	2,801	1.0
13	Pastime	851	0.3
14	Scientific activity	767	0.3
15	Water supply	457	0.2
16	Household enterprise	447	0.2
17	Real estate	292	0.1
18	Energy	69	-
	Total	281,648	100

=== Agriculture ===
Agriculture in Phichit province, the biggest sector of the economy, generated 17.959 billion baht (US$561 million) or 37.7% of GPP with a workforce of 123,346 (43.8% of all employed persons).

Agricultural land use, 3,329 km^{2} (1,285 sq mi) is 73.5% of total land of Phichit province 4,531 km^{2} (1,749 sq mi). This is divided as follows: paddy land: 2,899 km^{2} (1,119 sq mi) 64%, upland rice: 250 km^{2} (97 sq mi) 5.5%, farmland: 131 km^{2} (51 sq mi) 2.9%, orchard/perennial crop: 34 km^{2} (13 sq mi) 0.8% and vegetable/ornamental plant: 15 km^{2} (5.8 sq mi) 0.3

Production of the three main arable crops: rice 1,316,839 tonnes, sugarcane 814,381 tonnes and cassava 49,659 tonnes.

Production of the four main vegetable crops: watermelon 9,923 tonnes, aubergine 967 tonnes, yard long bean 526 tonnes and bird pepper 273 tonnes. Agricultural commodity produced in significant amount include: para rubber 309 tonnes. Further there are: pomelo 43,506 tonnes, lime 34,677 tonnes; banana 28,712 tonnes, mango 24,407 tonnes and tangerine 2,867 tonnes.

=== Animal husbandry ===
Livestock produced included: chickens 4,143,384, ducks 854,042, swines 42,656, beef cattle 17,425, goats 9,910, buffalos 8,930, sheep 1,299 and others 206,750.

=== Fisheries ===
Total catch from 10,077 freshwater aquaculture companies amounted to 121,380 tonnes.

=== Trade ===
Wholesale and retail trade; repair of motor vehicles and motorcycles, the second sector of the economy generated 6,911 billion baht (US$216 million) or 14.5% of GPP with 8,732 registered entities and a workforce of 56,288 (20%).

=== Manufacturing ===
The third sector of the economy generated 4,639 billion baht (US$145 million) or 9.7% of GPP with 3,802 registered entities and a workforce of 24,142 people (8.6%).

=== Construction ===
With 590 construction entities and a workforce of 11,756 people (4.2%) contributed 1,766 million baht (US$55.2 million) or 3.7% of GPP.

=== Transportation ===
Transportation with 10 companies and 4,086 people (1.4%) contributed 798 million baht (US$25 million) or 1.7% of GPP.

==== Rail ====
Phichit main station is Phichit railway station.

=== Accommodation and food service activities ===
2,561 registered hotels, restaurants and food service activities contributed 274 million baht (US$8.6 million) or 0.6 percent of GPP, with a workforce numbering 16,060 (5.7%).

== Tourism ==
There were 1,811 hotel rooms in 2021; about 280,908 people of which 280,814 Thai (almost 100%) visited Phichit province and contributed 445 million baht (US$13.9 million) to tourism revenues. Further explained: 160,457 tourists and 120,451 excursionists. Compared to the two previous years 2019 and 2020, the number of people decreased by 40% and 47% respectively, mainly due to the impact of the Covid-19 pandemic.

== Human achievement index 2022 ==
Health	Education	Employment	Income
45	51	68	10
Housing	Family	Transport	Participation
10	67	52	67
Province Phichit, with an HAI 2022 value of 0.6247 is "low", occupies place 62 in the ranking.

Since 2003, United Nations Development Programme (UNDP) in Thailand has tracked progress on human development at sub-national level using the Human achievement index (HAI), a composite index covering all the eight key areas of human development. National Economic and Social Development Board (NESDB) has taken over this task since 2017.

Rank	Classification
1 - 13	"high"
14 - 29	"somewhat high"
30 - 45	"average"
46 - 61	"somewhat low"
62 - 77	"low"

Map with provinces and HAI 2022 rankings

== Notable people ==
- Suriyenthrathibodi: 29th King of Ayutthaya
- Sanan Kachornprasart: politician
- Yodrak Salakjai: luk thung singer
- Santi Duangsawang: luk thung singer
- Busaba Athisthan: luk thung singer
- Veera Theerapattranon, known by his pseudonym Veera Theerapat: journalist, radio presenter, TV host, writer
- Chuchart Trairatanapradit, locally known Tai Phichit: professional snooker player
- Den Junlaphan, known professionally as Eagle Kyowa: professional boxer
- Jirayu Tangsrisuk (James): actor, singer, model
