= Mueang Phichit district =

District

Mueang Phichit เมืองพิจิตร
- District
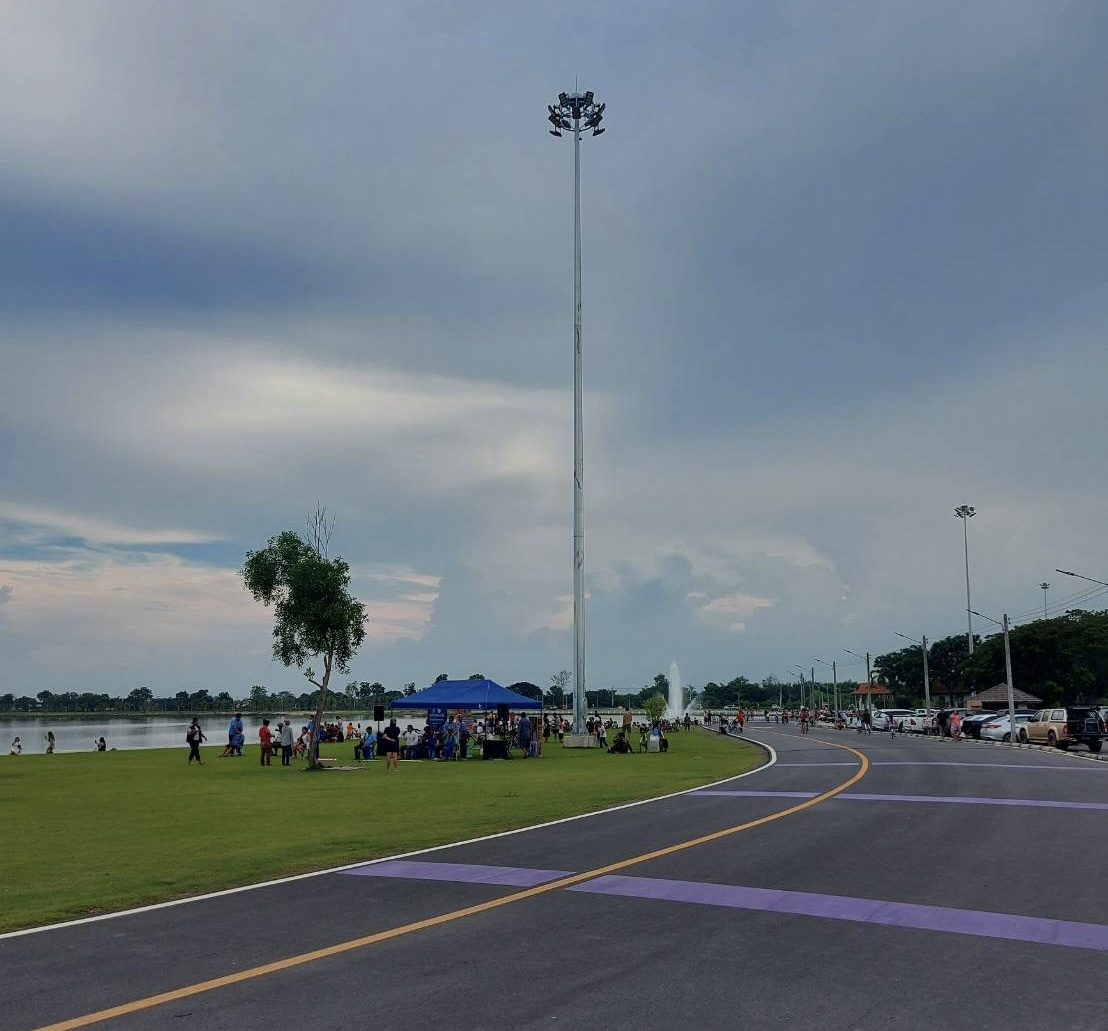
- Cycling track around Bueng Si Fai

- District location in Phichit province
- Coordinates: 16°26′18″N 100°21′0″E
- Country: Thailand
- Province: Phichit
- Seat: Nai Mueang

Area
  - Total: 738.9 km^{2} (285.3 sq mi)

Population (2008)
  - Total: 112,779
  - Density: 153/km^{2} (400/sq mi)
- Time zone: UTC+7 (ICT)
- Postal code: 66000
- Geocode: 6601

Mueang Phichit (Thai: เมืองพิจิตร, pronounced [mɯ̄a̯ŋ pʰí(ʔ).t͡ɕìt]) is the capital district (amphoe mueang) of Phichit province, central Thailand.

== History ==
In 1917 the district's name was changed from Mueang to Tha Luang (ท่าหลวง). In 1938 it was renamed Mueang Phichit.

== Administration ==
The district is divided into 16 sub-districts (tambons), which are further subdivided into 134 villages (mubans). The town (thesaban mueang) Phichit covers tambon Nai Mueang. There are three more sub-district municipalities (thesaban tambons). Tha Lo and Hua Dong each cover parts of their tambons, and Wang Krot parts of tambon Ban Bung. There are a further 15 tambon administrative organizations (TAO).

No.	Name	Thai	Villages	Pop.
1.	Nai Mueang	ในเมือง	-	23,521
2.	Phai Khwang	ไผ่ขวาง	8	3,727
3.	Yan Yao	ย่านยาว	10	6,048
4.	Tha Lo	ท่าฬ่อ	7	5,582
5.	Pak Thang	ปากทาง	9	5,945
6.	Khlong Khachen	คลองคะเชนทร์	10	8,480
7.	Rong Chang	โรงช้าง	7	5,800
8.	Mueang Kao	เมืองเก่า	9	5,876
9.	Tha Luang	ท่าหลวง	10	6,355
10.	Ban Bung	บ้านบุ่ง	7	7,462
11.	Kha Mang	ฆะมัง	12	6,368
12.	Dong Pa Kham	ดงป่าคำ	9	4,930
13.	Hua Dong	หัวดง	9	7,044
15.	Pa Makhap	ป่ามะคาบ	14	8,518
19.	Sai Kham Ho	สายคำโห้	5	2,579
20.	Dong Klang	ดงกลาง	9	4,544

Missing numbers are tambon which now form Sak Lek District.
