= Salween (disambiguation) =

Salween River or Salawin is a river in Burma, Thailand and China

Salween may also refer to:

== Places ==
- Salween or Salawin National Park in north-west Thailand
- Salawin Wildlife Sanctuary in north-west Thailand
- Salweyn also known as Salwine, an archaeological site in the northern Sanaag province of Somalia

== Other ==
- The Battle of the Salween River, a 1718 conflict between Chinese and Mongol forces in Tibet
- Salween (film), a 1994 Thai feature film
- Salweenia, a genus of flowering plants
