= Tham Pla–Namtok Pha Suea National Park =

National park in Thailand

- อุทยานแห่งชาติถ้ำปลา–น้ำตกผาเสื่อ
- IUCN category II (national park)
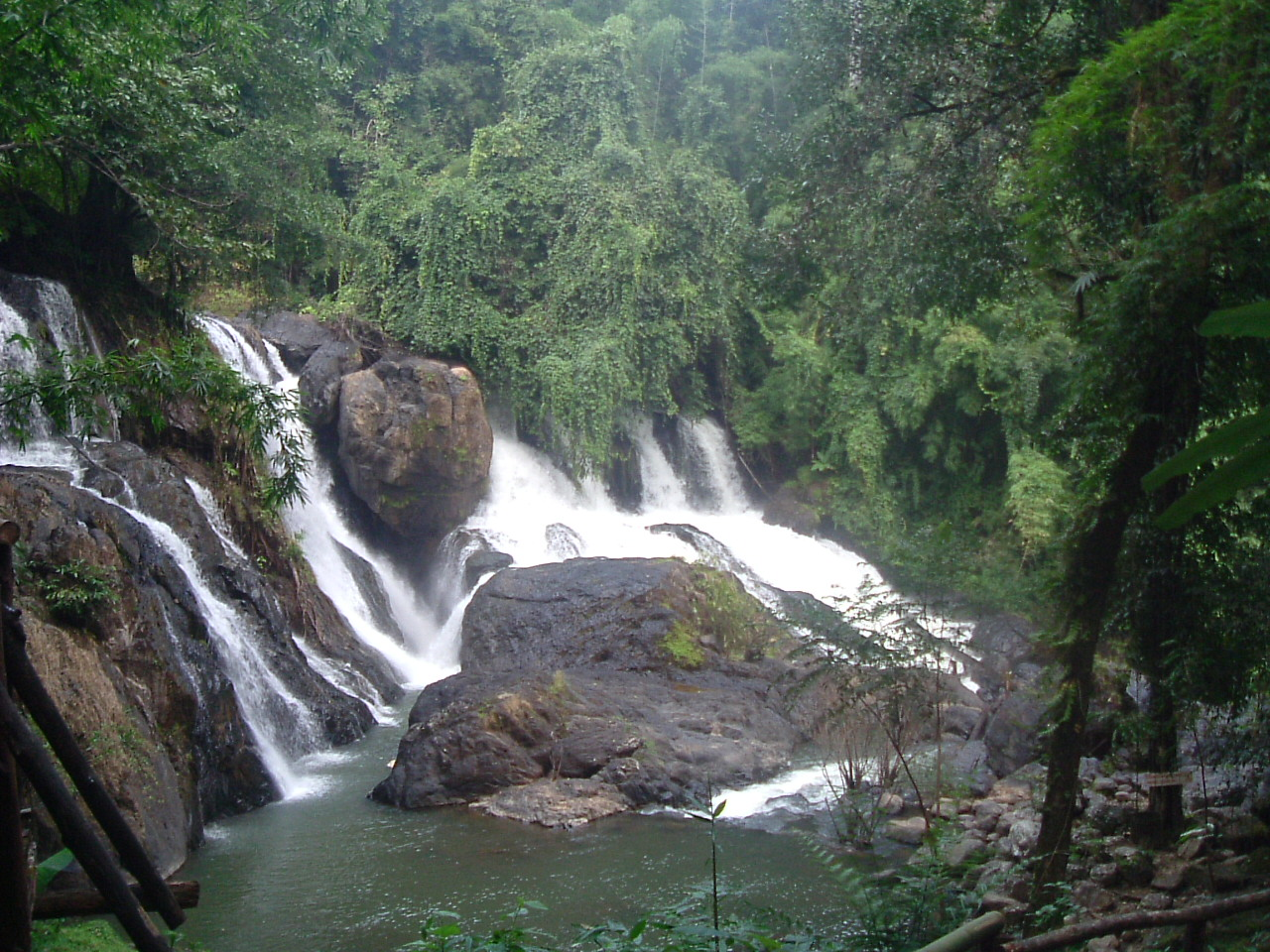
- Pha Suea Waterfall

- Location within Thailand
- Location: Mae Hong Son Province, Thailand
- Nearest city: Mae Hong Son
- Coordinates: 19°30′8″N 98°0′23″E
- Area: 630 km^{2} (240 sq mi)
- Established: 23 December 2010
- Visitors: 89,047 (in 2019)
- Governing body: Department of National Parks, Wildlife and Plant Conservation

Tham Pla–Namtok Pha Suea National Park (Thai: อุทยานแห่งชาติถ้ำปลา–น้ำตกผาเสื่อ) is a national park in Mae Hong Son Province, Thailand. It is home to caves, waterfalls and steep mountain terrain. It was established as the 116th national park on 23 December 2010.

== Geography ==
Tham Pla–Namtok Pha Suea National Park is about 18 kilometres (10 mi) northwest of Mae Hong Son in Mueang and Pang Mapha Districts. The park's area is 394,120 rai ~ 630 square kilometres (240 sq mi). The highest point is Doi Lan peak at 1,918 metres (6,300 ft) in the Daen Lao Range. The northern and western sides of the park border Burma's Shan and Kayah states respectively.

== Attractions ==
The park's main attraction is Tham Pla ("fish cave"), a water-filled cave hosting hundreds of mahseer barb. The fish are revered by locals and a nearby Hindu statue is said to protect them. Other caves include Tham Pha Daeng, a limestone cavern around 1 kilometre (0.6 mi) in depth.

Waterfalls include the Pha Suea waterfall at 15 metres (50 ft) high and Mae Sa-nga Klang waterfall also 15 metres (50 ft) high. Mae Sa-nga Klang is above the Mae Sa-nga Dam, a hydroelectric dam 37 metres (100 ft) high and 160 metres (500 ft) long.

== Flora and fauna ==
The park features forest types including mixed deciduous, deciduous dipterocarp, pine and evergreen. Tree species include Lagerstroemia floribunda, tabaek, Shorea obtusa, Shorea siamensis, Sindora siamensis, makha, Xylia xylocarpa, teak, Pterocarpus macrocarpus, Terminalia pedicelleta, takian, Tenasserim pine, and Khasi pine.

Animals in the park include goral, gaur, barking deer and wild boar.

== Location ==
Tham Pla-Namtok Pha Suea National Park in overview PARO 16 (Mae Sariang branch)

5) Tham Pla-Namtok Pha Suea National Park in overview PARO 16 (Mae Sariang)

	National park
1	Mae Ngao
2	Mae Sariang
3	Namtok Mae Surin
4	Salawin
5	Tham Pla–Namtok Pha Suea
	Wildlife sanctuary
6	Doi Wiang La
7	Lum Nam Pai
8	Mae Yuam Fang Khwa
9	Salawin
10	San Pan Daen

	Non-hunting area
11	Lum Nam Pai Fang Sai
	Forest park
12	Kaeo Komon
13	Mai sak Yai
14	Namtok Huai Mae Saed
15	Namtok Klo Kho
16	Namtok Mae Sawan Noi
17	Namtok Mae Yuam Luang
18	Namtok Mai Sang Nam
19	Pha Hin Tang
20	Tham Tara Lod
21	Thung Bua Tong

	Arboretum
22	Doi Mak Hin Hom
23	Huai Chom Phu
24	Mae Surin
25	Pong Khae

== See also ==
- List of national parks of Thailand
- DNP - Tham Pla-Namtok Pha Suea National Park
- List of Protected Areas Regional Offices of Thailand
