= Namtok Mae Surin National Park =

National park in Thailand

- อุทยานแห่งชาติน้ำตกแม่สุรินทร์
- IUCN category II (national park)
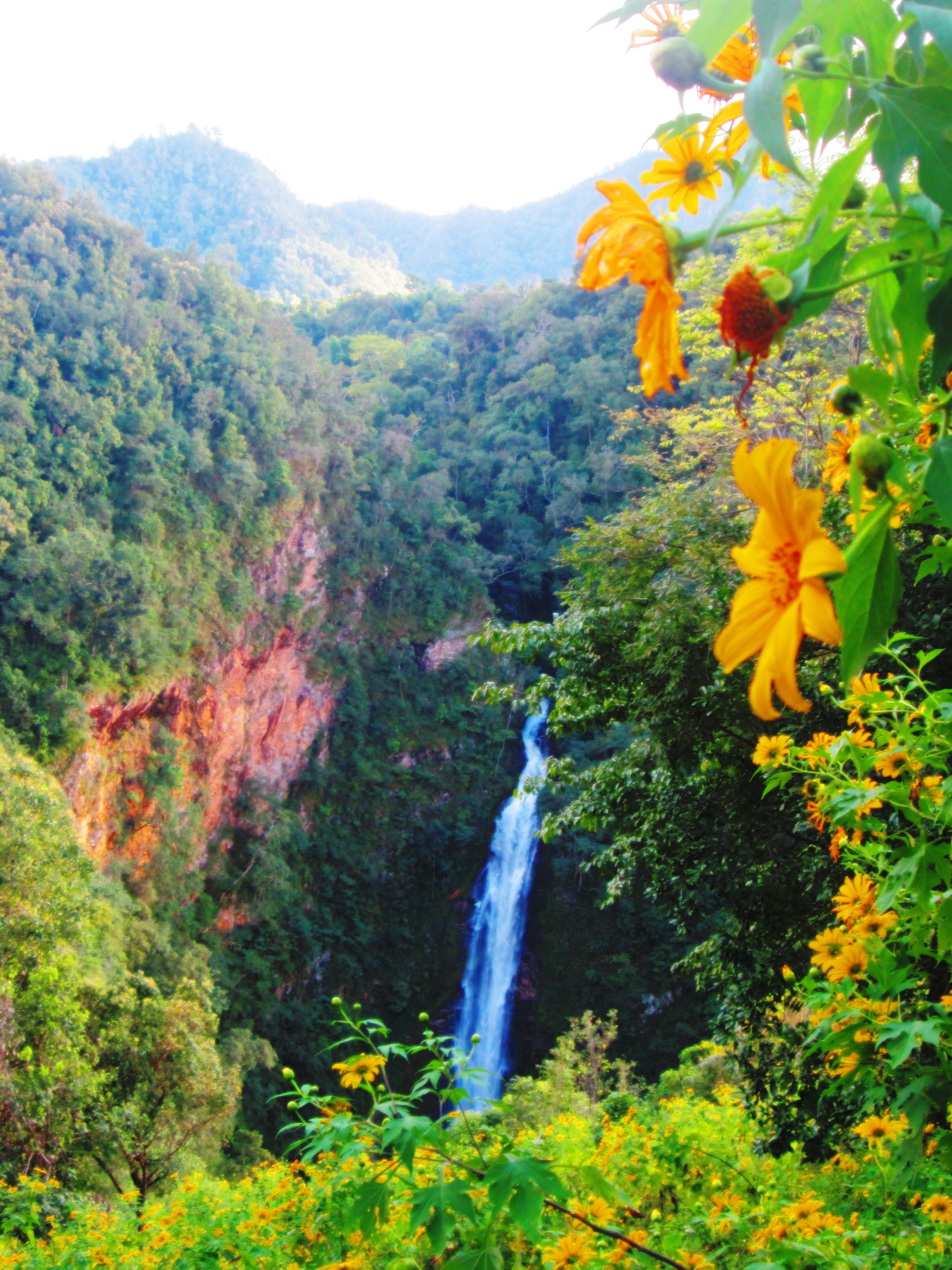
- Mae Surin Waterfall

- Location within Thailand
- Location: Mae Hong Son Province, Thailand
- Nearest city: Mae Hong Son
- Coordinates: 19°8′26″N 98°1′58″E
- Area: 397 km^{2} (153 sq mi)
- Established: 1981
- Visitors: 5,471 (in 2019)
- Governing body: Department of National Parks, Wildlife and Plant Conservation

Namtok Mae Surin National Park (Thai: อุทยานแห่งชาติน้ำตกแม่สุรินทร์) is a national park in Mae Hong Son Province, Thailand. Home to mountains, waterfalls and caves, the park is best known for its namesake Mae Surin waterfall.

== Geography ==
Namtok Mae Surin National Park is located east of Mae Hong Son town in Mae Hong Son and Khun Yuam districts. The park's area is 247,875 rai ~ 397 square kilometres (153 sq mi). The highest point is Doi Pui peak at 1,685 metres (5,528 ft). Doi Pui is part of the Thanon Thongchai Range, whose various peaks within the park range from 300–1,700 m (980–5,580 ft).

== History ==
In 1981, Namtok Mae Surin was designated Thailand's 37th National Park.

== Attractions ==
The park's main attraction is its namesake waterfall, Mae Surin, a single-tier waterfall 180 metres (590 ft) in height. Another large waterfall is Pa Bong, a two-tier waterfall with a height of 30 metres (98 ft). Many of the park's streams eventually join the Pai River, which flows through the park. Nam Hu Haichai Cave is notable for being the site of a water jet erupting from the cave's interior walls at a regular interval of every 25 minutes.

== Flora and fauna ==
Namtok Mae Surin features deciduous and dipterocarp forests and, in higher areas, pine forests. Tree species include Dipterocarpus alatus, Pinus latteri, Terminalia bellirica and Pinus kesiya. The park is home to a rare and indigenous lady slipper orchid.

Animal species include Malayan sun bear, Asiatic black bear, serow, barking deer, lar gibbon, wild boar, python and cobra. Bird life includes drongo and hornbill.

== Gallery ==
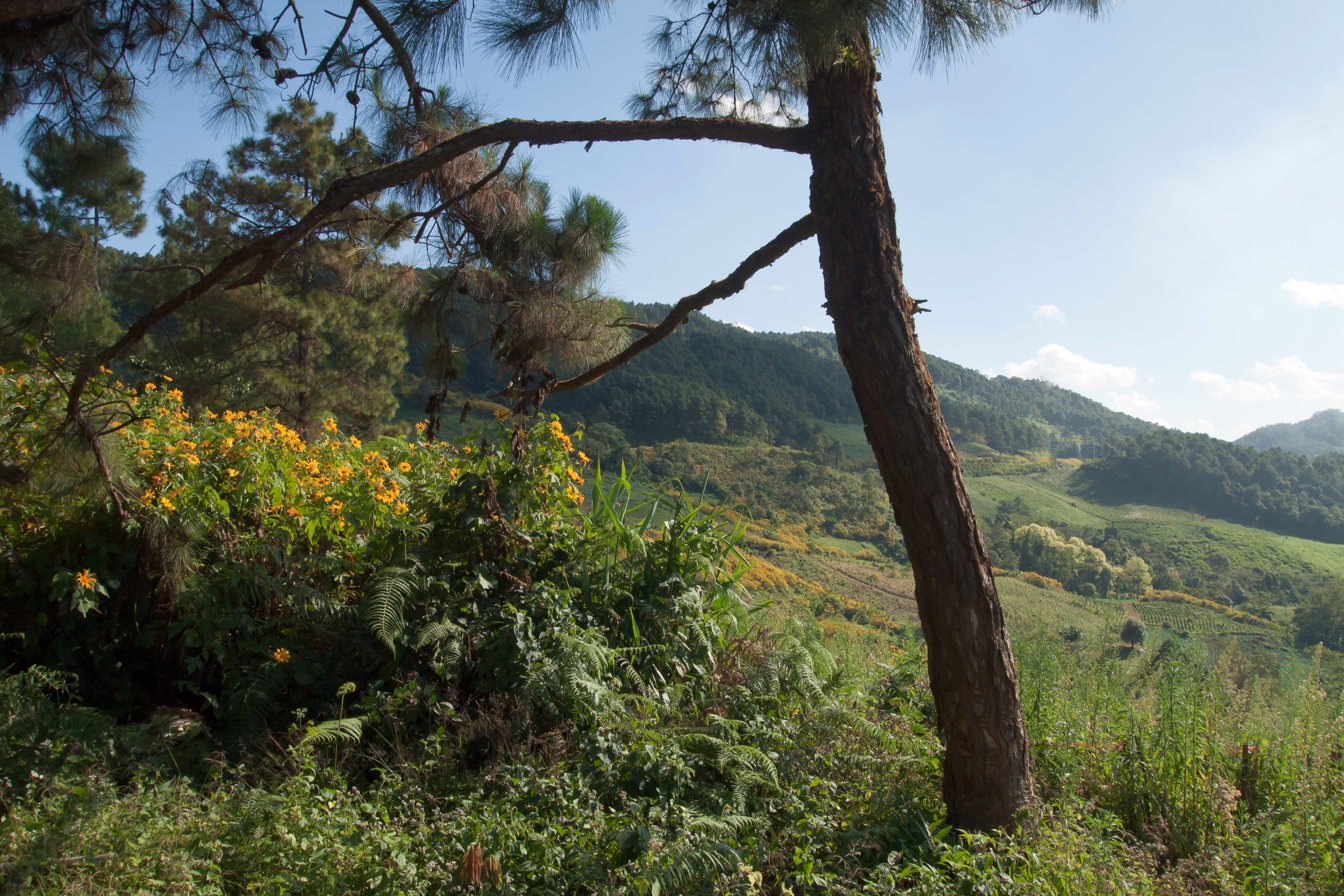

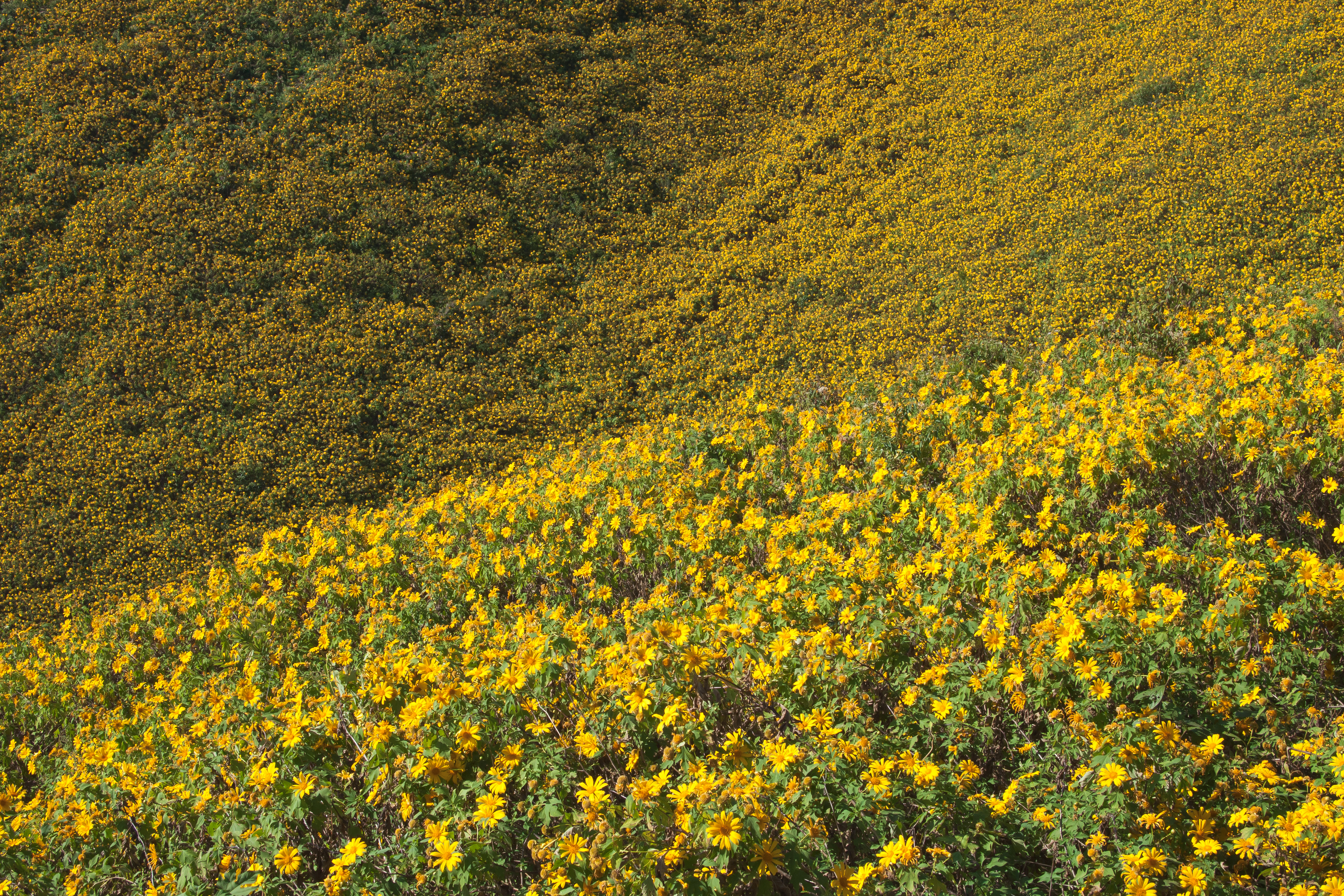

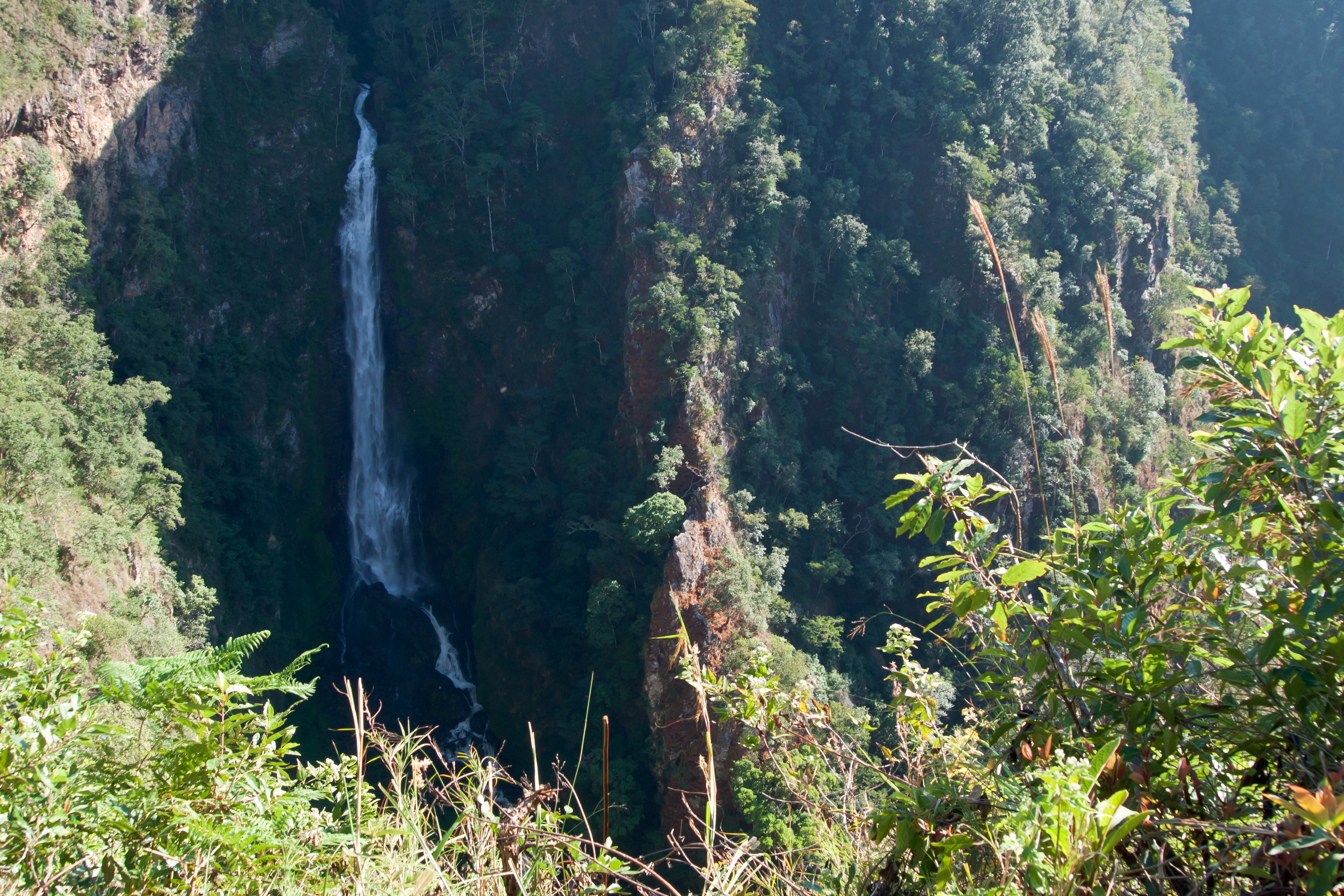

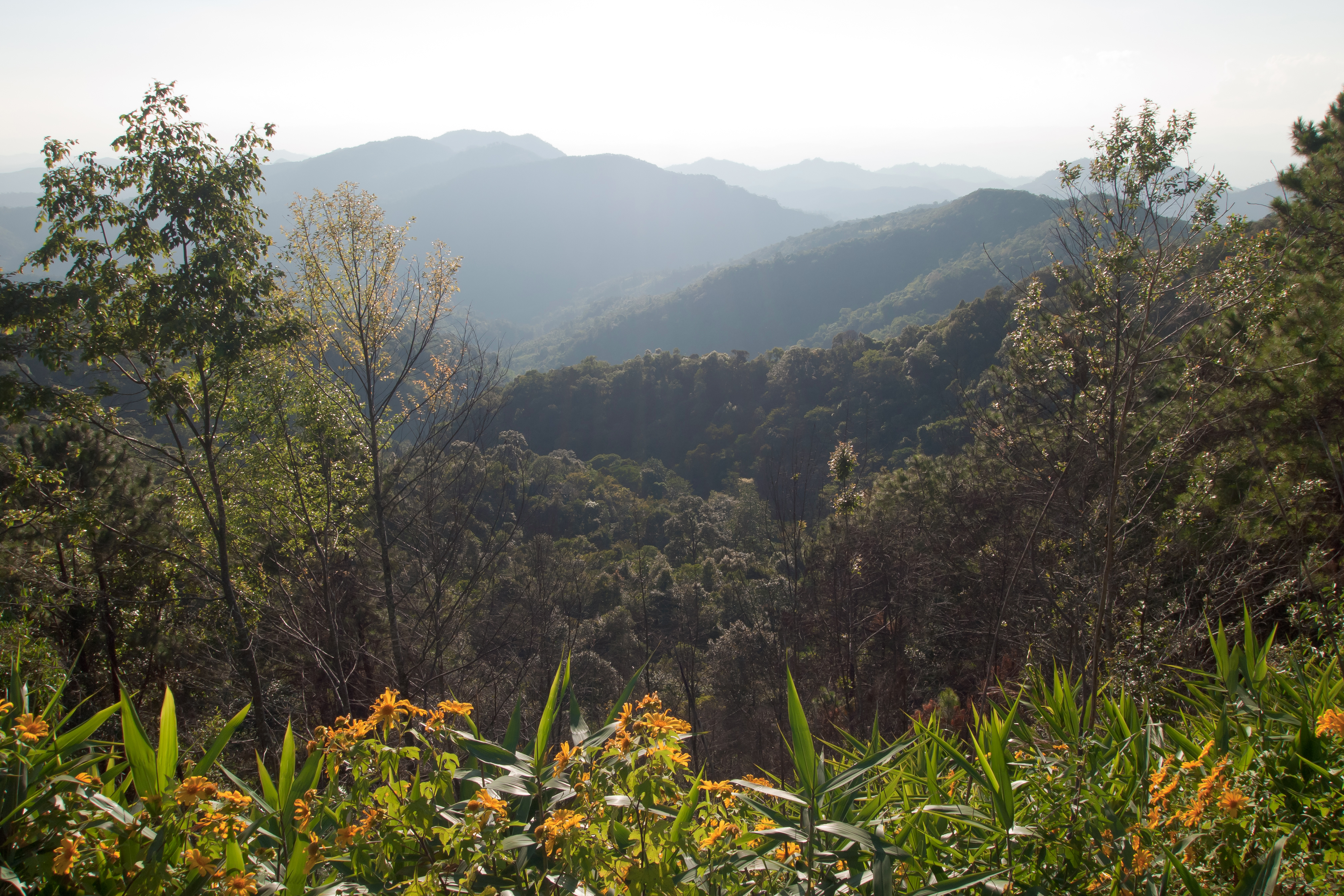

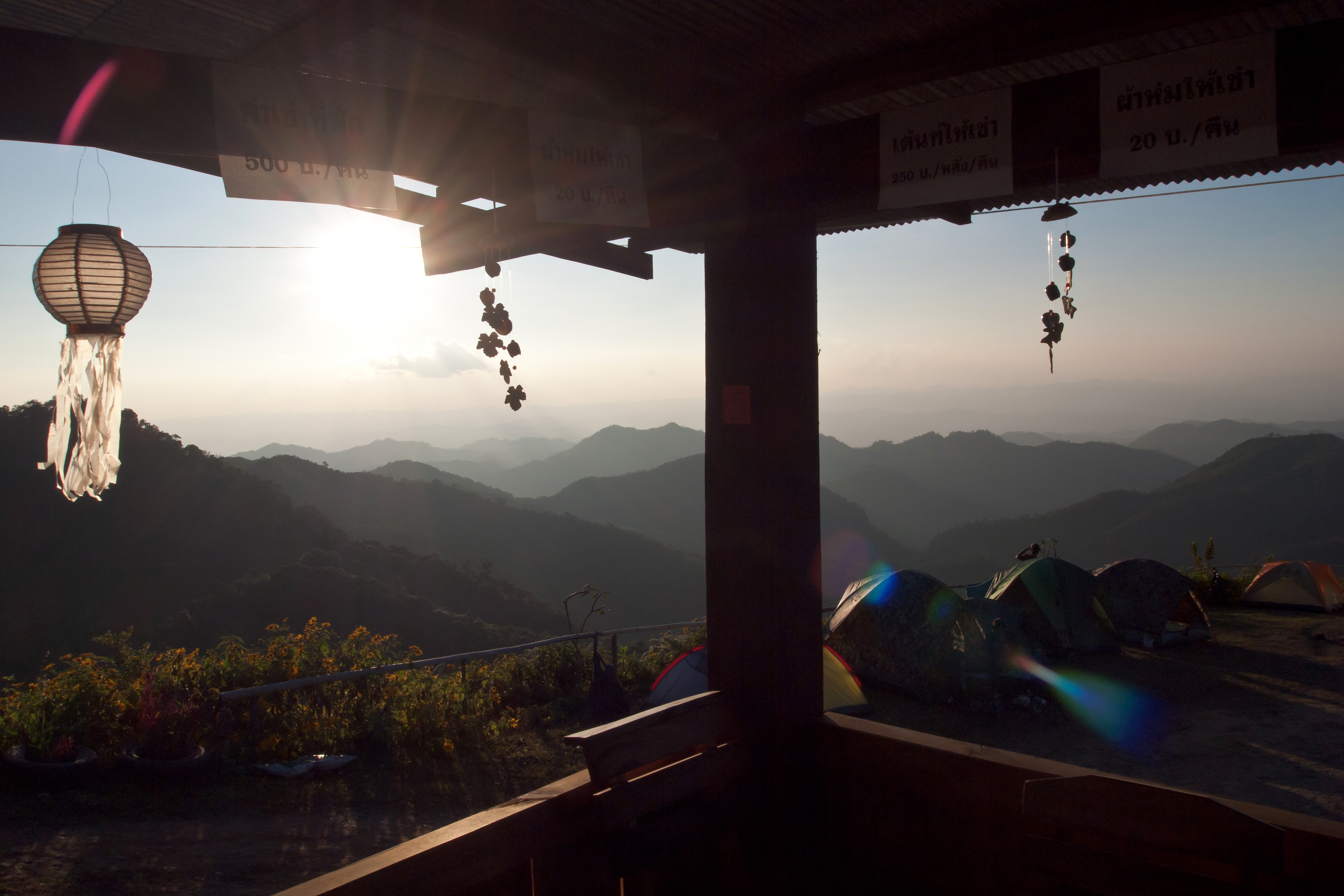

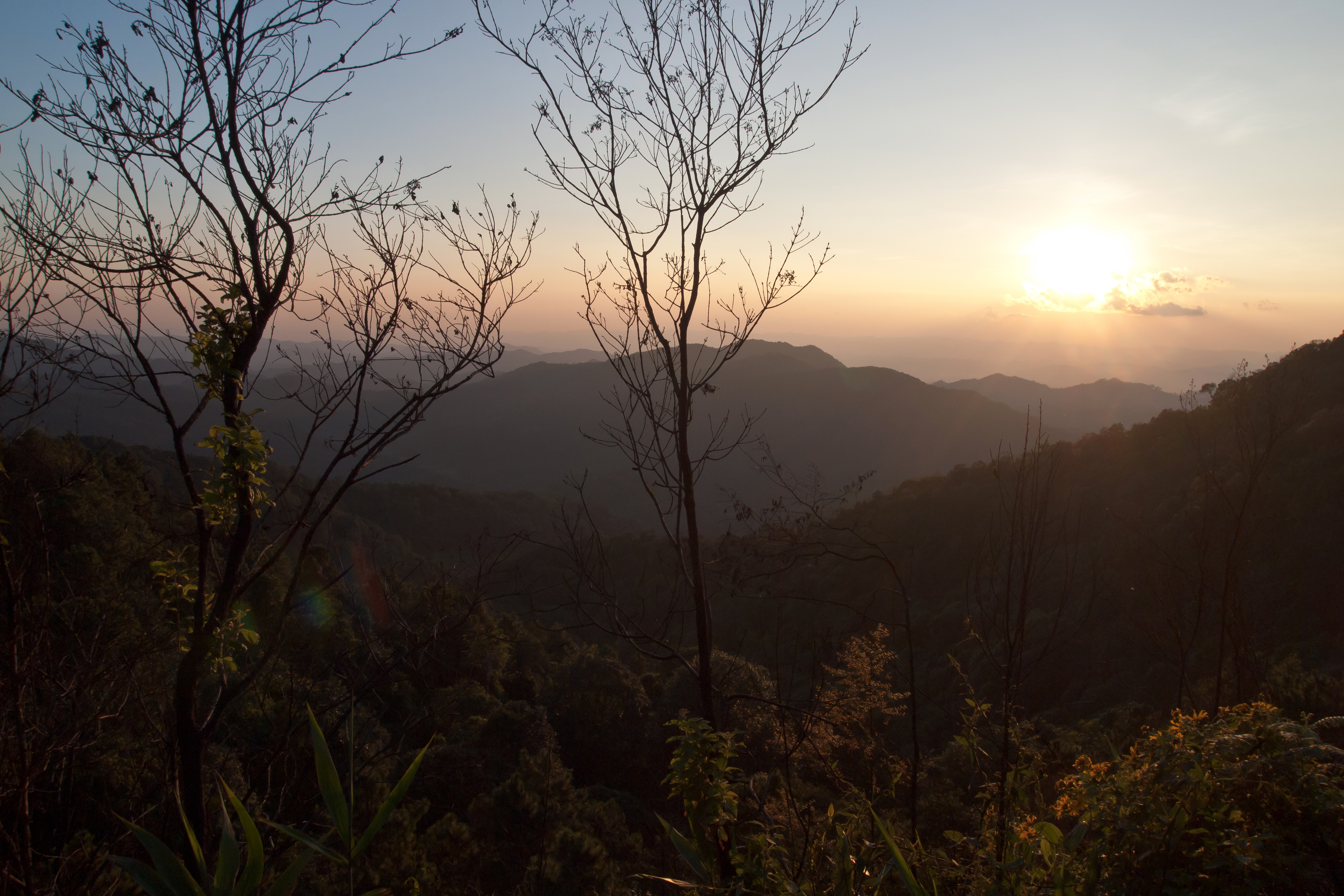

== Location ==
Namtok Mae Surin National Park in overview PARO 16 (Mae Sariang branch)

3) Namtok Mae Surin National Park in overview PARO 16 (Mae Sariang branch)

	National park
1	Mae Ngao
2	Mae Sariang
3	Namtok Mae Surin
4	Salawin
5	Tham Pla–Namtok Pha Suea
	Wildlife sanctuary
6	Doi Wiang La
7	Lum Nam Pai
8	Mae Yuam Fang Khwa
9	Salawin
10	San Pan Daen

	Non-hunting area
11	Lum Nam Pai Fang Sai
	Forest park
12	Kaeo Komon
13	Mai sak Yai
14	Namtok Huai Mae Saed
15	Namtok Klo Kho
16	Namtok Mae Sawan Noi
17	Namtok Mae Yuam Luang
18	Namtok Mai Sang Nam
19	Pha Hin Tang
20	Tham Tara Lod
21	Thung Bua Tong

	Arboretum
22	Doi Mak Hin Hom
23	Huai Chom Phu
24	Mae Surin
25	Pong Khae

== See also ==
- List of national parks of Thailand
- DNP - Namtok Mae Surin National Park
- List of Protected Areas Regional Offices of Thailand
