= Mae Hong Son province =

Mae Hong Son แม่ฮ่องสอน ᨾᩯ᩵ᩁ᩵ᩬᨦᩈᩬᩁ
- Province
- จังหวัดแม่ฮ่องสอน ᨧᩢ᩠ᨦᩉ᩠ᩅᩢᨯᨾᩯ᩵ᩁᩬ᩵ᨦᩈᩬᩁ
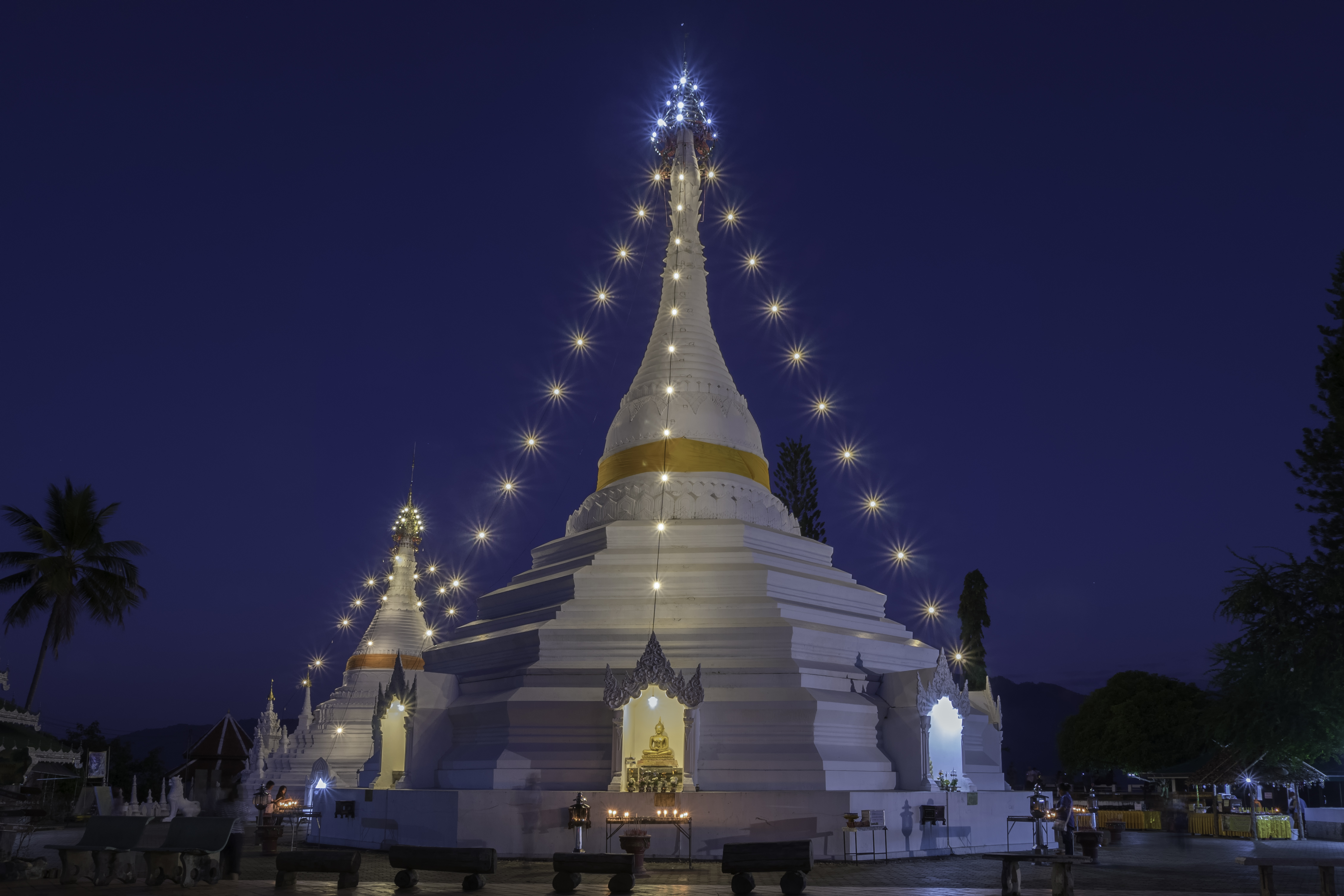
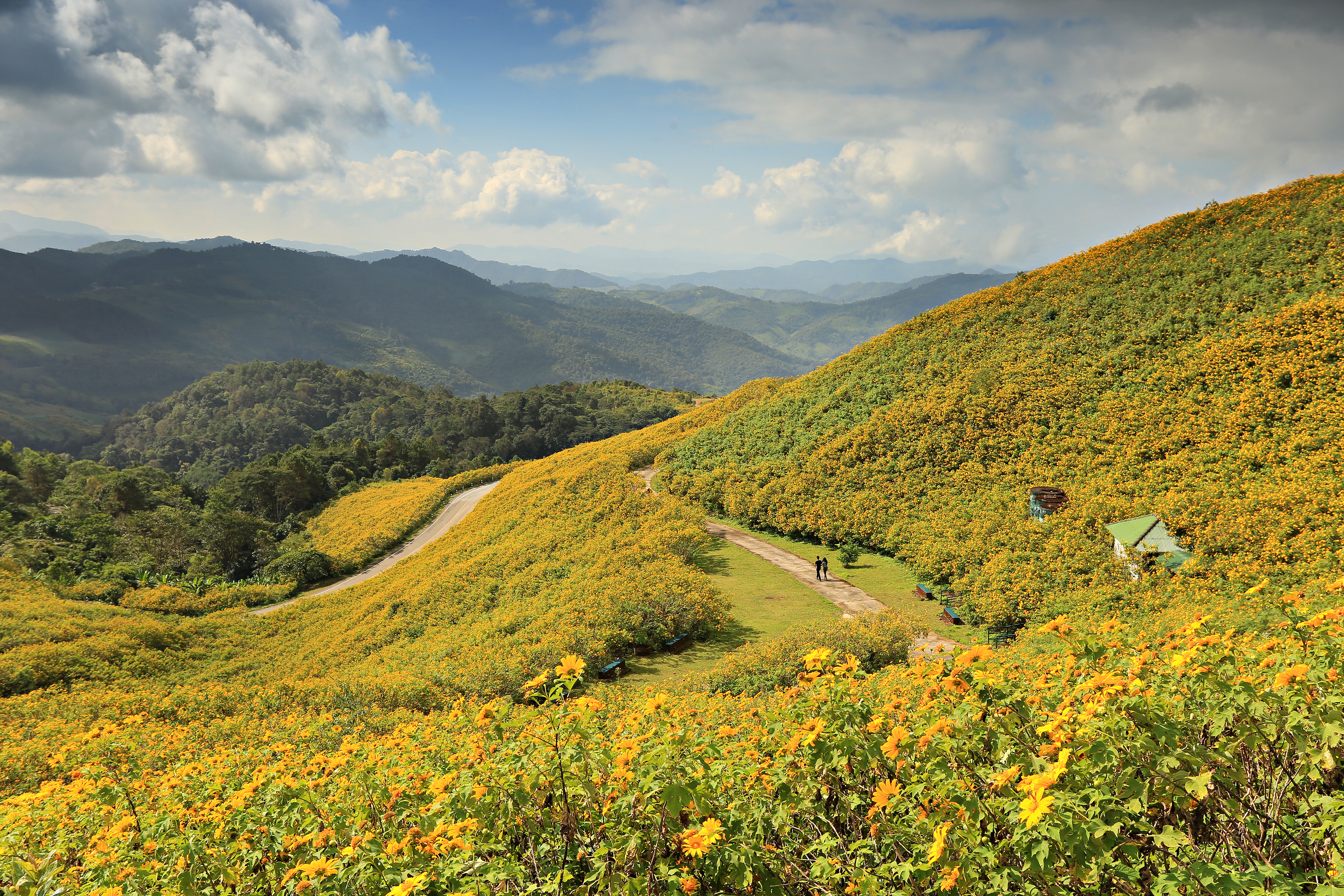
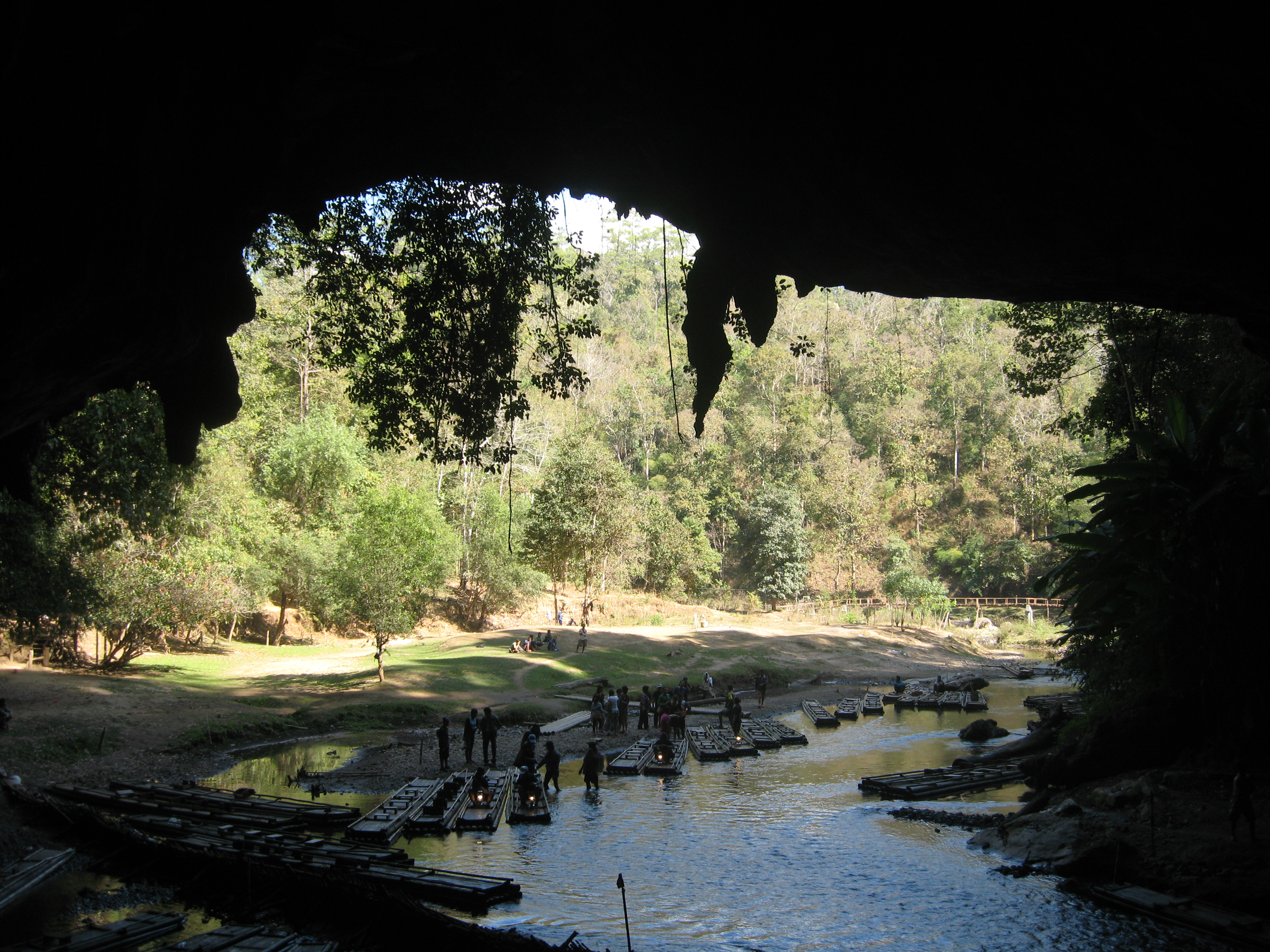
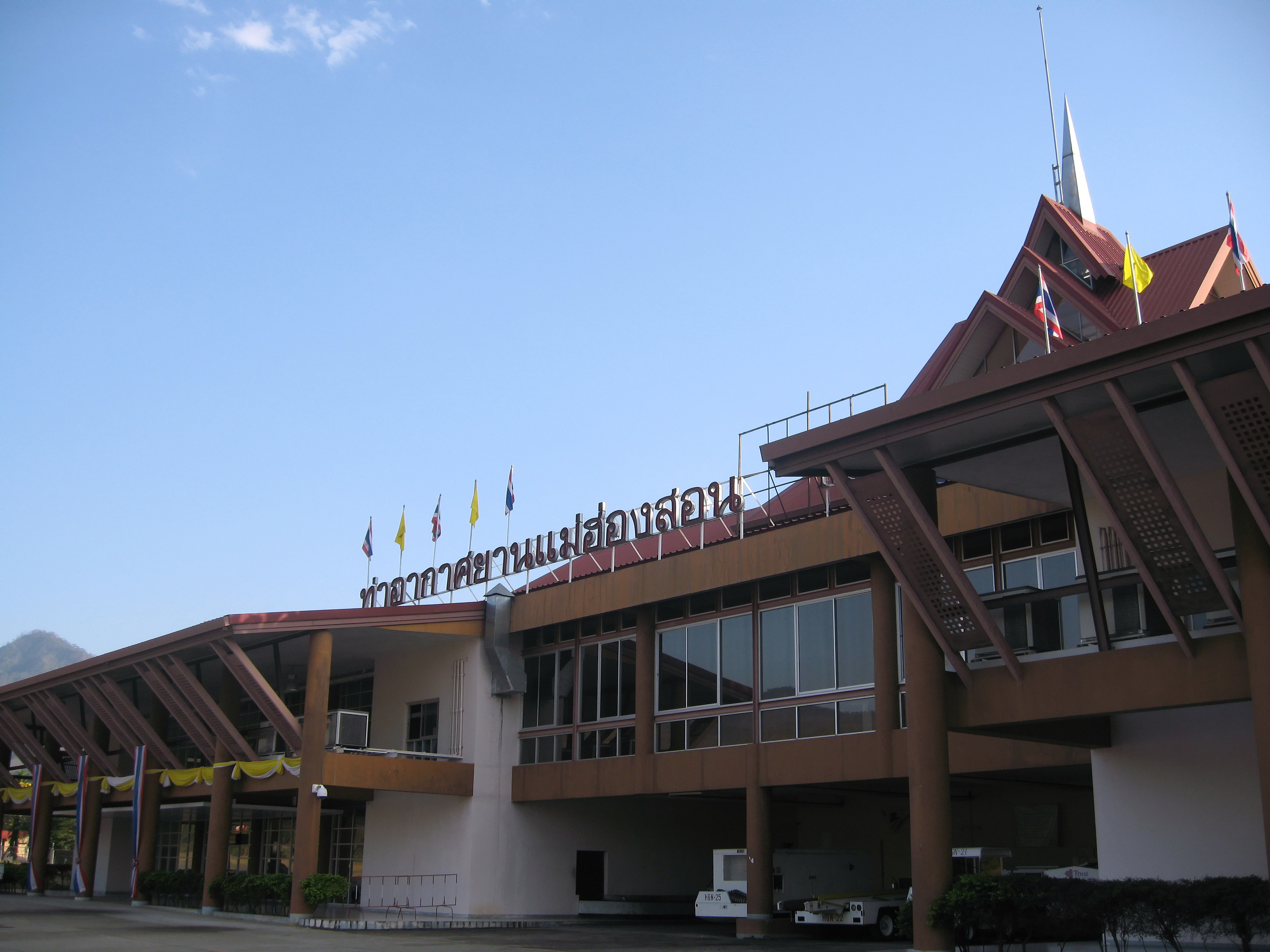
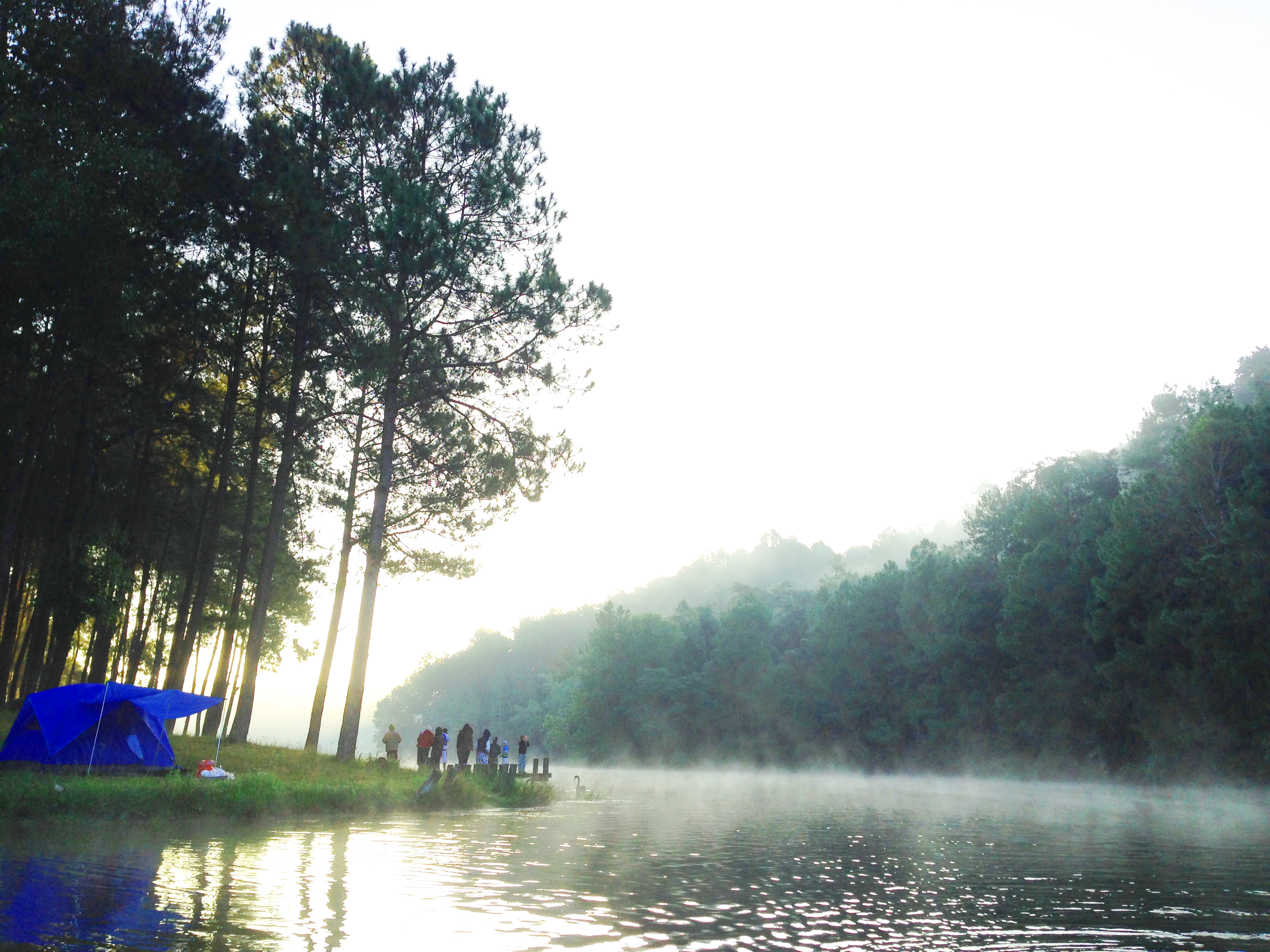
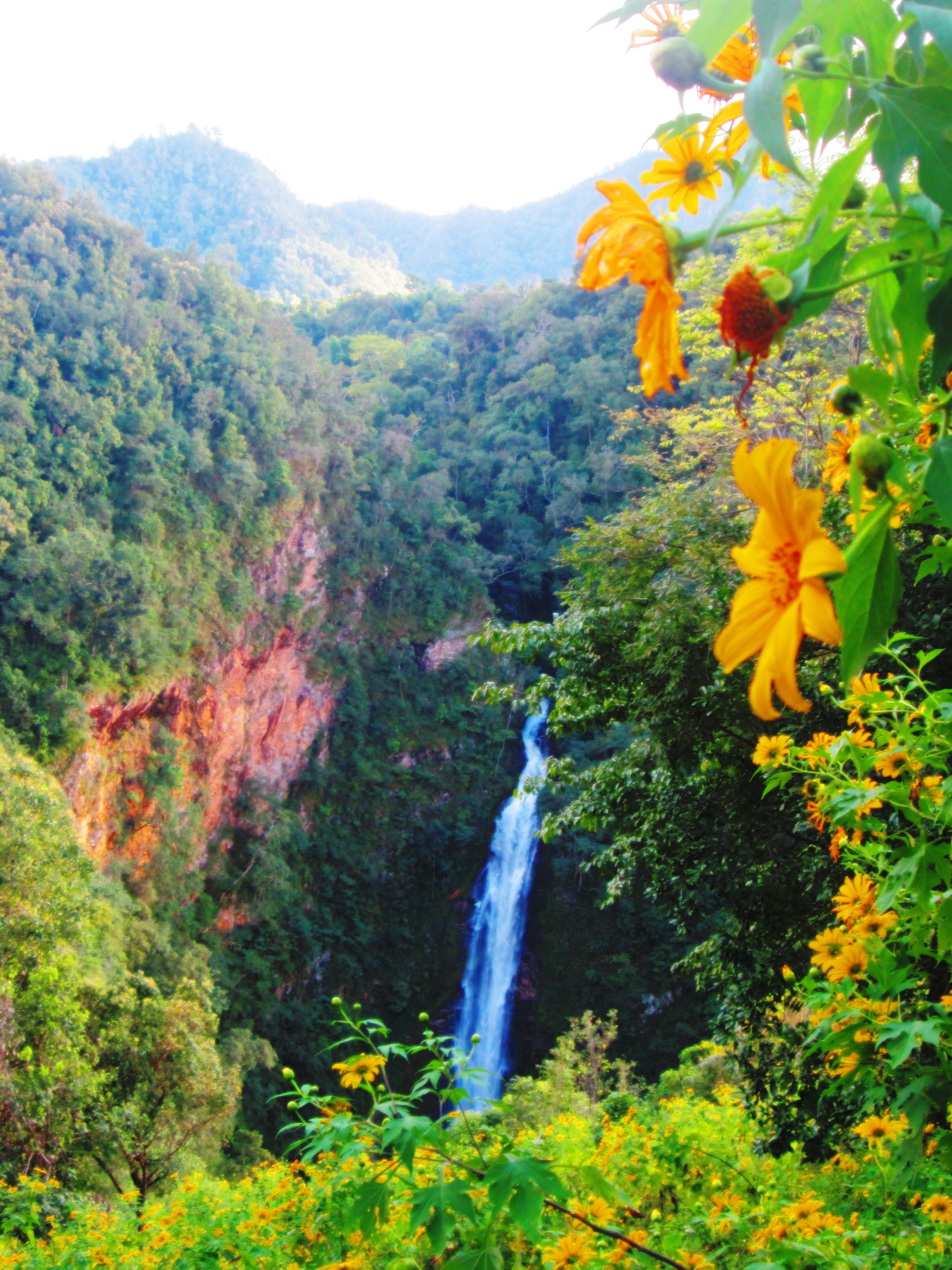
- From top: Wat Phrathat Doi Kong Mu; Bua tong (tree marigold) fields in Doi Mae-U-Kho, Khun Yuam; Spirit cave; Mae Hong Son Airport; Pang Oung, a romantic reservoir in Mueang Mae Hong Son; Mae Surin Falls, the highest waterfall in the northern Thailand

- Flag Seal
- Nickname: Mueang Sam Mok (City of three mists)
- Motto: หมอกสามฤดู กองมูเสียดฟ้า ป่าเขียวขจี ผู้คนดี ประเพณีงาม ลือนามถิ่นบัวตอง ("Three-season mists. Towering (Phra That Doi) Kong Mu. Lush forests. Good people. Beautiful traditions. Famous home of the tree marigold.")
- Map of Thailand highlighting Mae Hong Son province
- Coordinates: 19°17′17″N 97°57′52″E
- Country: Thailand
- Capital: Mae Hong Son

Government
  - Type: Province and Provincial Administrative Organization
  - Body: Mae Hong Son Province and Mae Hong Son Provincial Administrative Organization
  - Governor: Ekkawit Meepian
  - PAO Chief Executive: Akaradej Wanchaithanawong

Area
  - Total: 12,765 km^{2} (4,929 sq mi)
  - Rank: 7th

Population (2024)
  - Total: ▲288,082
  - Rank: 70th
  - Density: 23/km^{2} (60/sq mi)
  - Rank: 77th

Human Achievement Index
  - HAI (2022): 0.5974 "low" Ranked 76th

GDP
  - Total: baht 13 billion (US$0.4 billion) (2019)
- Time zone: UTC+7 (ICT)
- Postal code: 58xxx
- Calling code: 052 and 053
- ISO 3166 code: TH-58
- Website: maehongson.go.th/new/

Mae Hong Son province
- "Mae Hong Son" in Thai language (top) and Northern Thai with Tai Tham script (bottom)

Thai name
- Thai: แม่ฮ่องสอน
- RTGS: Mae Hong Son

Northern Thai name
- Northern Thai: ᨾᩯ᩵ᩁᩬ᩵ᨦᩈᩬᩁ (Mae Hong Son)

Mae Hong Son (Thai: แม่ฮ่องสอน, pronounced [mɛ̂ː.hɔ̂ŋ.sɔ̌ːn]; Northern Thai: ᨾᩯ᩵ᩁᩬ᩵ᨦᩈᩬᩁ; Burmese: မဲဟောင်ဆောင်; Shan: မႄႈႁွင်ႈသွၼ်), formerly called Mae Rong Son, also spelled Maehongson, Mae Hong Sorn or Maehongsorn, is one of Thailand's seventy-six provinces (changwat). It lies in upper northern Thailand and is the westernmost province. Neighboring provinces are (clockwise from north) Shan State of Myanmar, Chiang Mai and Tak. To the west, the province borders Kayin State and Kayah State of Myanmar. Mae Hong Son's nickname is "the city of three mists". It is hemmed in by the high mountain ranges of the Shan Hills and is the most mountainous province in Thailand, occupying 12,765 square kilometres (4,929 sq mi). The population density is 22 persons per km^{2}, the lowest of all provinces. The province is often covered with mist. Mae Hong Son town was originally established in the early 19th century as an elephant training camp as ordered by the then King of Chiang Mai. As of 2012, Mae Hong Son was the poorest province in Thailand.

== History ==
Mae Hong Son province was formerly part of Mawkmai State, one of the Shan States which had been founded in 1767 by Hsai Khiao, from a noble family of Chiang Mai.

As a result of the Anglo-Siamese Boundary Commission of 1892–1893, Mae Hong Son district was ceded to Siam, but the adjacent Möngmaü and Mehsakun trans-Salween districts also claimed by Siam (as territories on the eastern side of the Salween River), were kept as part of British Burma.

== Environment ==
The Thai government, to solve persistent water shortages in the central region, have proposed a 70.7 billion baht plan to divert some 1.8 billion m^{3} of water annually from the Yuam River to the perennially underfilled Bhumibol Dam. Several of the province's districts would impacted. As part of the plan, the Royal Irrigation Department (RID), would build 69 metre high dam with a storage capacity of 68.7 million m^{3} constructed on 2,075 rai of forest land, together with a pumping station on a separate 55 rai plot and a 61.5 kilometre-long tunnel passing through 14 villages. The inhabitants of the area—primarily Karen tribes people—largely oppose the project. In December 2019, the RID submitted a second environmental impact assessment (EIA) to the Office of the Natural Resources and Environmental Policy and Planning (ONEP). ONEP rejected the EIA for the second time due to concerns about forest destruction, tunnel rock waste, and compensation issues.

== Demographics ==
=== Ethnic diversity ===
Shan people are the largest population group in the province. They migrated from Shan State in Myanmar. Further there are seven hill tribes which consists of 63% of the provincial population: Karen, Lahu, Lisu, Lua, Miao, Chinese Yunnan and Pa-O people.

The Karen are not a single group, but rather a mix of closely related tribes. Among the smallest of the Karen tribes in Thailand are Kayan Lahwi. This group's women are recognized by the large brass rings they wear around their necks.

=== Language ===
- Tai Yai people speak their own language. The written language with round alphabets is like Mon and Burmese script.
- Karen and Chinese Haw have their own spoken and written language.
- Lahu, Lisu and Lua people have their own spoken language, but their written language uses the Latin alphabet.

=== Religion ===
Most inhabitants, 77.5%, are Buddhists, followed by Christians at 20.9%, and Muslims at 0.5%. About 1.1% believe in animism and other religions.

== Geography ==
=== Location ===
Mae Hong Son province is approximately 924 kilometres (574 mi) north of Bangkok by road. To the north and west it connects to a total of three states in the Union of Burma, namely the southern portion of Shan State, Kayah State, and Kawthoolei State, via the Dawna Range, and the Salween and Moei Rivers. These formations serve as natural boundaries between the countries. To the south, it borders the district of Tha Song Yang and Tak, via the rivers Yuam and Ngao, which serve as a provincial boundary. To the east it borders the districts of Wiang Haeng, Chiang Dao, Mae Taeng, Mae Chaem, Hot and Omkoi in Chiang Mai province, via the central and east sections of the Thanon Thongchai mountain ranges, which serve as a boundary between the two provinces.

Every district in Mae Hong Son province shares a common border, measuring approximately 483 kilometres in total length, with Myanmar. The common border consists of approximately 326 km (203 mi) of land boundary and 157 km (98 mi) of river boundary (not counting the Salween, 127 km (79 mi), and Moei, 30 km (19 mi)).

=== Topography ===
Most of the areas of Mae Hong Son province are the complex mountain ranges of the Thai highlands, parts of which are still covered with rainforest. The total forest area is 10,915 km^{2} (4,214 sq mi) or 85.5 percent of provincial area.

The Daen Lao Range, in the northernmost portion of the province, marks the northern boundary between Thailand and Burma, while the Dawna Range in the west serves as the boundary between Thailand and Burma. The Thanon Thongchai Range in the east of the province serves as the boundary between the provinces of Mae Hong Son and Chiang Mai. The highest point of the province is Doi Mae Ya (ยอดเขาแม่ยะ), in the Pai District in the province's northeast, at 2,005 metres (6,578 ft) elevation.

=== Climate ===
Mae Hong Son province has a tropical savanna climate (Köppen climate classification category Aw). Winters are dry and warm. Temperatures rise until May. Monsoon season runs from May through October, with heavy rain and somewhat cooler temperatures during the day, although nights remain warm. Temperature statistics: Its maximum temperature is 44.6 °C (112.3 °F) on 28 April 2016 and the lowest temperature is 3.9 °C (39.0 °F). The highest average temperature is 35.6 °C (96.1 °F) on 25 December 1999 and the minimum average temperature is 18.0 °C (64.4 °F). The average relative humidity is 96.99% and the minimum relative humidity is 20%. Annual rainfall is 1,064.9 millimeters and on 23 April 1968 was for 24 hour the rainfall 130.4 mm. The number of rainy days was 130 days for a year.

=== National parks ===
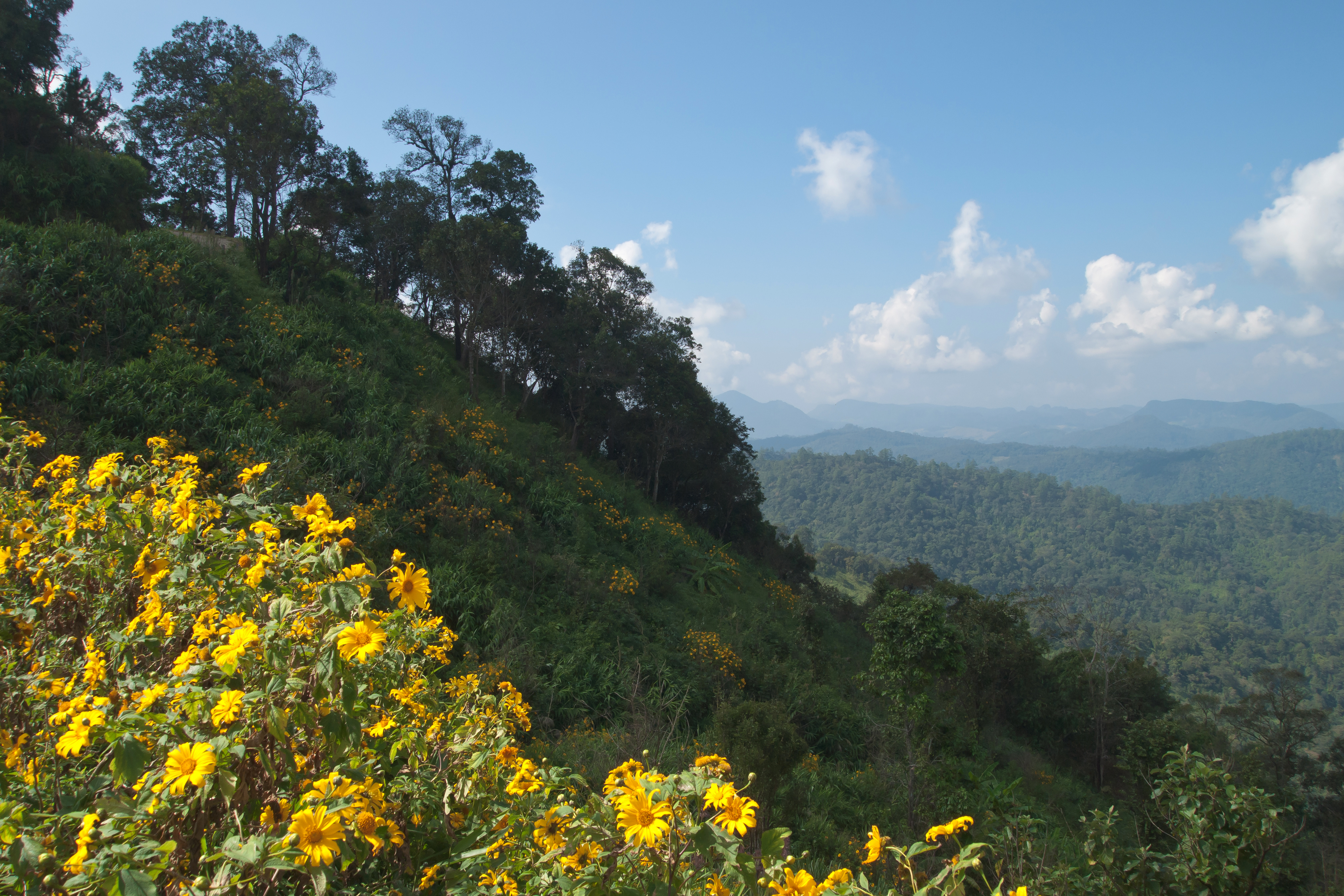
Huai Nam Dang National Park

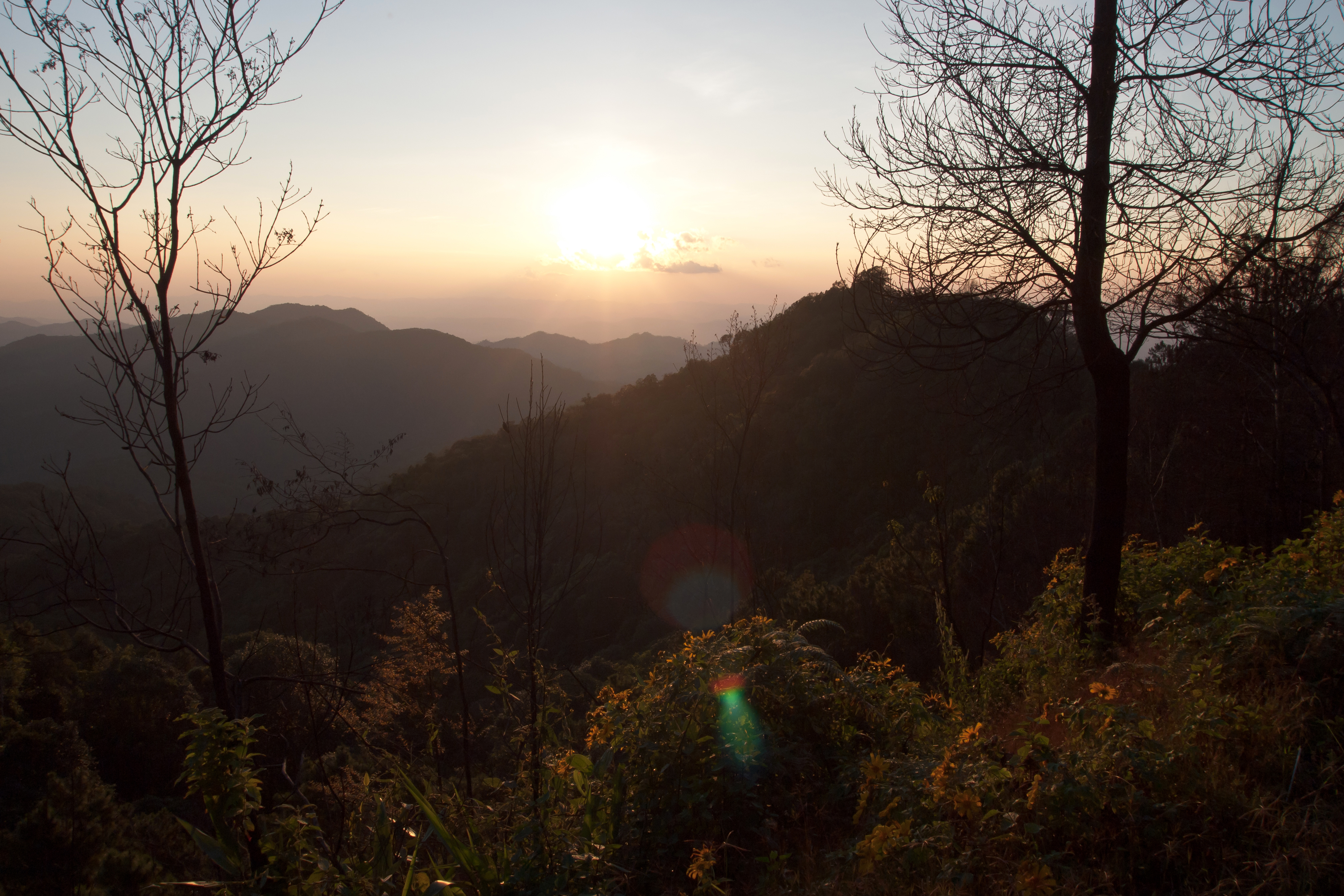
Namtok Mae Surin National Park

There are six national parks, with total area of 3,419 square kilometres (1,320 sq mi), of which five in region 16 (Mae Sariang branch) and Huai Nam Dang in region 16 (Chiang Mai), they are the protected areas of Mae Hong Son province. (Visitors in fiscal year 2024)

Huai Nam Dang National Park	1,252 km^{2} (483 sq mi)	(121,109)
Salawin National Park	721 km^{2} (278 sq mi)	(1,380)
Tham Pla-Namtok Phu Suea N.P.	630 km^{2} (240 sq mi)	(100,529)
Namtok Mae Surin National Park	396 km^{2} (153 sq mi)	(7,205)
Mae Ngao National park	228 km^{2} (88 sq mi)	(20,365)
Mae Sariang National Park	192 km^{2} (74 sq mi)	(587)

=== Wildlife sanctuaries ===
There are six wildlife sanctuaries, with a total area of 3,684 square kilometres (1,422 sq mi), of which five in region 16 (Mae Sariang branch) and Mae Lao-Mae Sae in region 16 (Chiang Mai), they are the protected areas of Mae Hong Son province.

Lum Nam Pai Wildlife Sanctuary	1,180 km^{2} (460 sq mi)
Salawin Wildlife Sanctuary	955 km^{2} (369 sq mi)
Mae Lao-Mae Sae Wildlife Sanctuary	514 km^{2} (198 sq mi)
Doi Wiang La Wildlife Sanctuary	466 km^{2} (180 sq mi)
Mae Yuam Fang Khwa Wildlife Sanctuary	292 km^{2} (113 sq mi)
San Pan Daen Wildlife Sanctuary	277 km^{2} (107 sq mi)

=== Location protected areas ===
Overview of protected areas of Mae Hong Son

Mae Hong Son protected areas

	National park
1	Huai Nam Dang
2	Mae Ngao
3	Mae Sariang
4	Namtok Mae Surin
5	Salawin
6	Tham Pla-Namtok Pha Suea

	Wildlife sanctuary
7	Doi Wiang La
8	Lum Nam Pai
9	Mae Lao-Mae Sae
10	Mae Yuam Fang Khwa
11	Salawin
12	San Pan Daen

=== Water resources ===
There are 31 water reservoirs with total capacity of 12.31 million cubic meters:

- Huai So Tue, capacity 1,880,000 m^{3}
- Huai Fai Kho, capacity 950,000 m^{3}
- Huai Mae Hong Son, cap. 734,000 m^{3}.
- Huai Mae Salap, cap. 700,000 m^{3}.

There are 617 groundwater wells, which are used to mine groundwater for general use.

=== Mineral resources ===
Among the minerals that have been discovered in the province are limestone, coal, lignite, lead, zinc, tin, tungsten, antimony, fluoride, and feldspar. The mineral area is approximately 2,440 km^{2} (19% of provincial area). One of those mines in Mae Hong Son province is the Samoeng mine.

== Administrative divisions ==
Map of districts

=== Provincial government ===
The province is divided into seven districts (amphoes). These are further divided into 45 subdistricts (tambons) and 415 villages (mubans).

1. Mae Hong Son
2. Khun Yuam
3. Pai
4. Mae Sariang
5. Mae La Noi
6. Sop Moei
7. Pang Mapha

=== Local government ===
As of 26 November 2019 there are: one Mae Hong Son Provincial Administration Organisation (ongkan borihan suan changwat) and seven municipal (thesaban) areas in the province. Mae Hong Son has town (thesaban mueang) status. There are a further six subdistrict municipalities (thesaban tambon). The non-municipal areas are administered by 42 Subdistrict Administrative Organisations (SAO) (ongkan borihan suan tambon).

== Symbols ==
The provincial seal, Rup chang nai thong nam (รูปช้างในท้องน้ำ), meaning 'image of an elephant in a body of water', is a reference to the training of wild elephants for battle and various types of animal labour. "Rup chang nai thong nam" was selected as the provincial seal because it refers to Mae Hong Son's founding, which began with Lord Kaeo of Ma being sent to capture elephants for the Lord of Chiang Mai (1825–1846). Once in Mae Hong Son, he gathered the scattered Shan settlements to establish two main villages, Ban Pang Mu and Ban Mae Hong Son, that would be ruled by their elected leaders.

The provincial flag is horizontally divided in dark brown/blue/dark brown (1:3:1) with the image of the provincial seal in the middle of the flag.

The provincial tree is the Millettia brandisiana (Thai: กระพี้จั่น; RTGS: kraphichan), the provincial flower is the Tree marigold (Thai: บัวตอง; RTGS: buatong), and the provincial animal is the Blyth's river frog (Thai: กบภูเขา; RTGS: kobphukhao).

The official provincial slogan promoted by the Thai government is หมอกสามฤดู กองมูเสียดฟ้า ป่าเขียวขจี ผู้คนดี ประเพณีงาม ลือนามถิ่นบัวตอง (RTGS: mok sam ruedu, kong mu siat fa, pa khiao khachi, phu khon di, prapheni ngam, lue nam thin bua tong), meaning 'Mists throughout the three seasons, the Kong Mu (monastery) that scrapes the sky, verdant forests, gentle people, beautiful customs; renowned land of marigolds'.

== Infrastructure ==
=== Education ===
Higher educational institutions are:

- Chiang Mai Rajabhat University, Mae Hong Son campus.
- Mae Hong Son Community College.
- Nawamintrachinaracha Industrial and Community Education College.
- Mae Sariang Industrial and Community Education College.

There are eight secondary schools in Mae Hong Son.

=== Healthcare ===
Every district has a hospital. There are also 72 subdistrict health-promoting hospitals. There are 63 public health centers, 10 insect-induced disease control centers, 15 malaria clinics, 21 community malaria centers and one health service (Thanyarak Mae Hong Son hospital).

=== Transportation ===
==== Roads ====
There are four major roads in the province:

- Hot District of Chiang Mai to Mae Hong Son, distance 345 km
- Mae Tang District of Chiang Mai province to Mae Hong Son, distance 246 km.
- Mae Sot District of Tak province to Mae Hong Son.
- Mae Chaem District of Chiang Mai province to Khun Yuam District of Mae Hong Son province, distance 90 km.

==== Public transport ====
Two bus companies (Prem Pracha Transport Co and Sombat Tour Co.) operate four bus services:

- Bangkok - Mae Hong Son, distance is 928 km, travel time is 17 hours.
- Chiang Mai - Mae Sariang - Mae Hong Son, distance is 359 km, travel time is eight hours.
- Chiang Mai (Pai District) - Mae Hong Son, distance is 250 km, travel time is six hours.
- Mae Sot District of Tak province - Mae Sariang District of Mae Hong Son.

==== Air transport ====
Bangkok Airways provides daily flights between Chiang Mai International Airport and Mae Hong Son Airport.
Kan Air provides flights, three times a week, between Chiang Mai International Airport and Pai Airport.

=== Electricity ===
Mae Hong Son is supplied with electricity from power stations in Chiang Mai province (districts Chom Thong, Hot and Mae Taeng), along with eight power plants in Mae Hong Son province:

- Pha Bong Dam Hydro Plant
- Mae Sa Nga Dam Hydro Plant
- Mae Sariang Hydro Plant
- Mae Hong Son Diesel Power Plant
- Pha Bong Solar Power Plant

In 2020, out of 123,826 households only 77,402 households have electricity.

=== Communications ===
As of 2018 there were 65,153 households, of which 2.1% used telephones, 15.2% used computers with no internet connection, and 45.5% used computers with internet. As of 2018 there were 182,615 people aged six years and older, of which 22.2% used computers, 38.9% the internet, and 81.3% used mobile phones.

== Human achievement index 2022 ==
Health	Education	Employment	Income
56	76	35	57
Housing	Family	Transport	Participation
67	3	74	23
Province Mae Hong Son, with an HAI 2022 value of 0.5974 is "low", occupies place 76 in the ranking.

Since 2003, United Nations Development Programme (UNDP) in Thailand has tracked progress on human development at sub-national level using the Human achievement index (HAI), a composite index covering all the eight key areas of human development. National Economic and Social Development Board (NESDB) has taken over this task since 2017.

Rank	Classification
1 - 13	"high"
14 - 29	"somewhat high"
30 - 45	"average"
46 - 61	"somewhat low"
62 - 77	"low"

Map with provinces and HAI 2022 rankings

== Events and festivals ==
- Poi Sang Long Procession (งานประเพณีปอยส่างลอง)
- Chong Phara Procession (งานประเพณีจองพารา)
- Bua Tong Blossom Festival (งานวันดอกบัวตองบาน)
- Loi Krathong Festival (ประเพณีลอยกระทง หรือ งานเหลินสิบสอง)
- Small World Festival

== Gallery ==
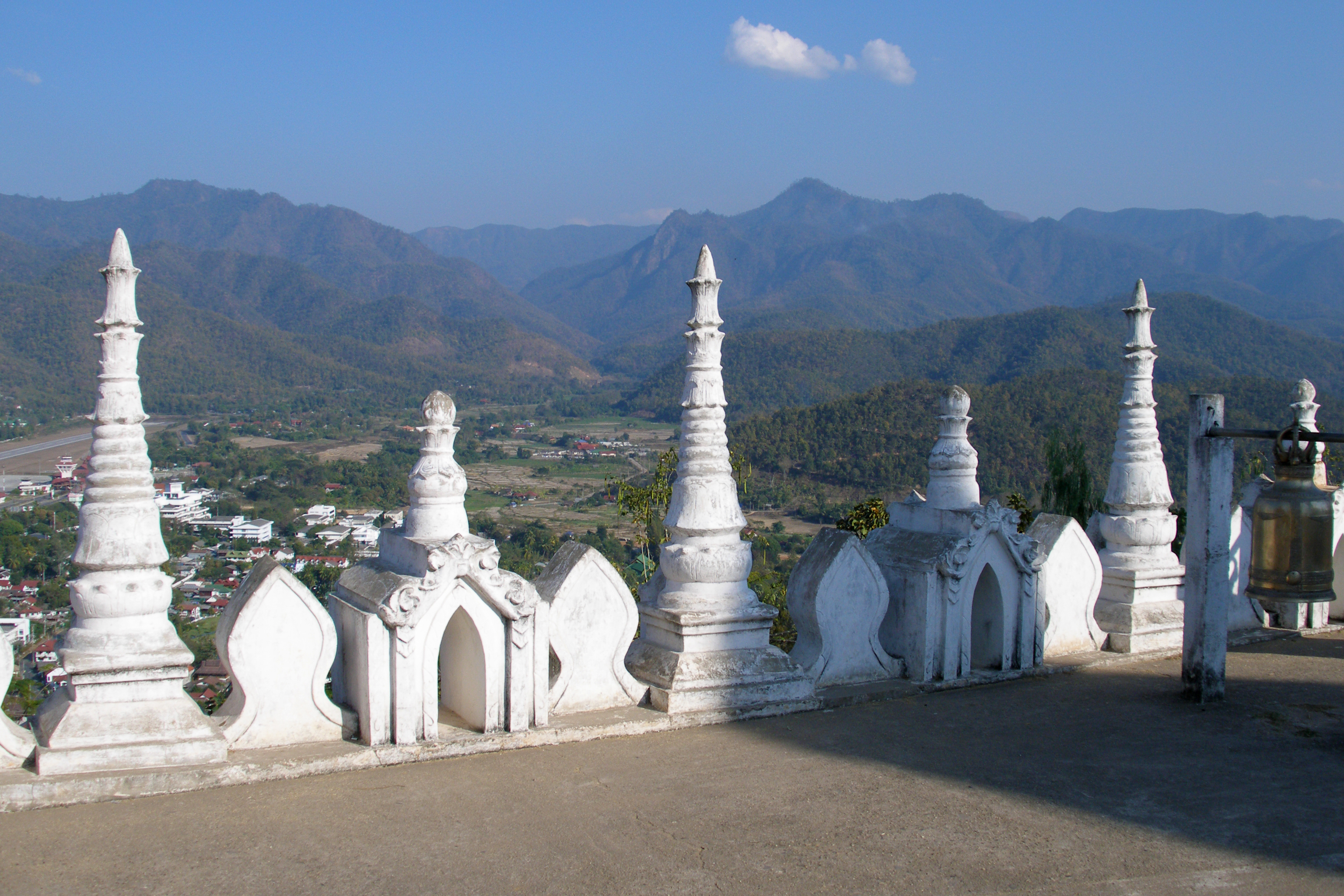
Stupas in Mae Hong Son

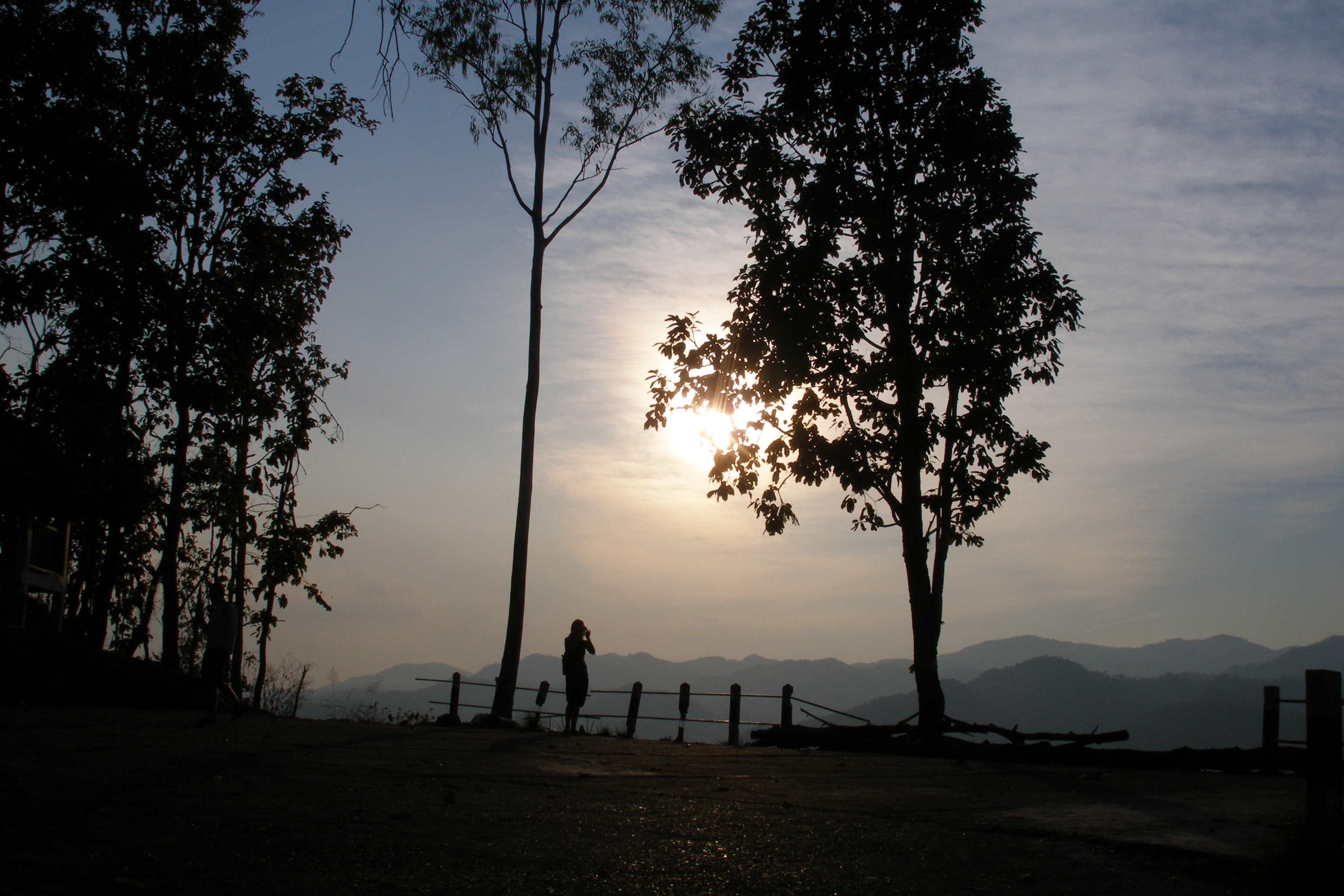
Mae Hong Son countryside

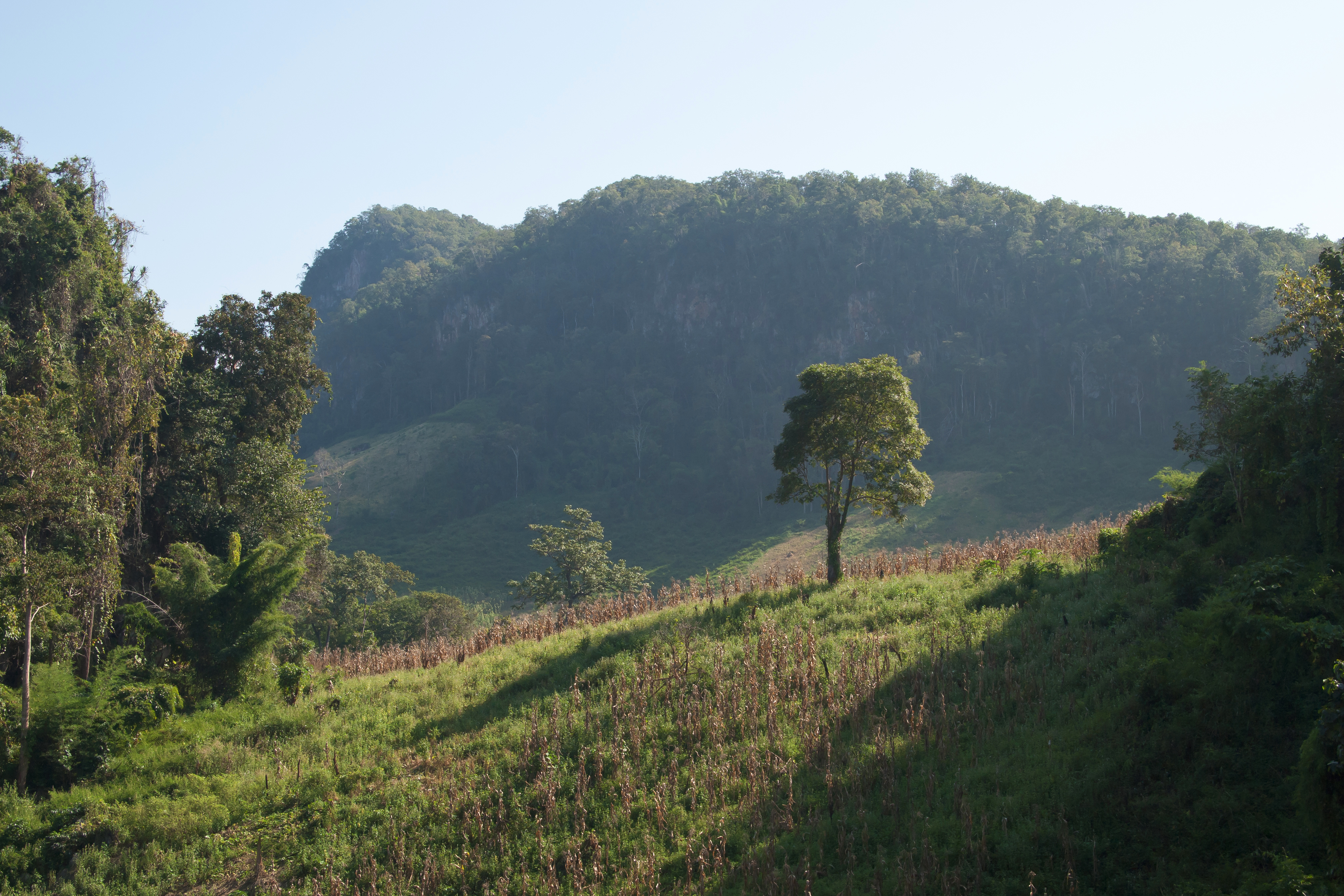
Hills near border with Myanmar

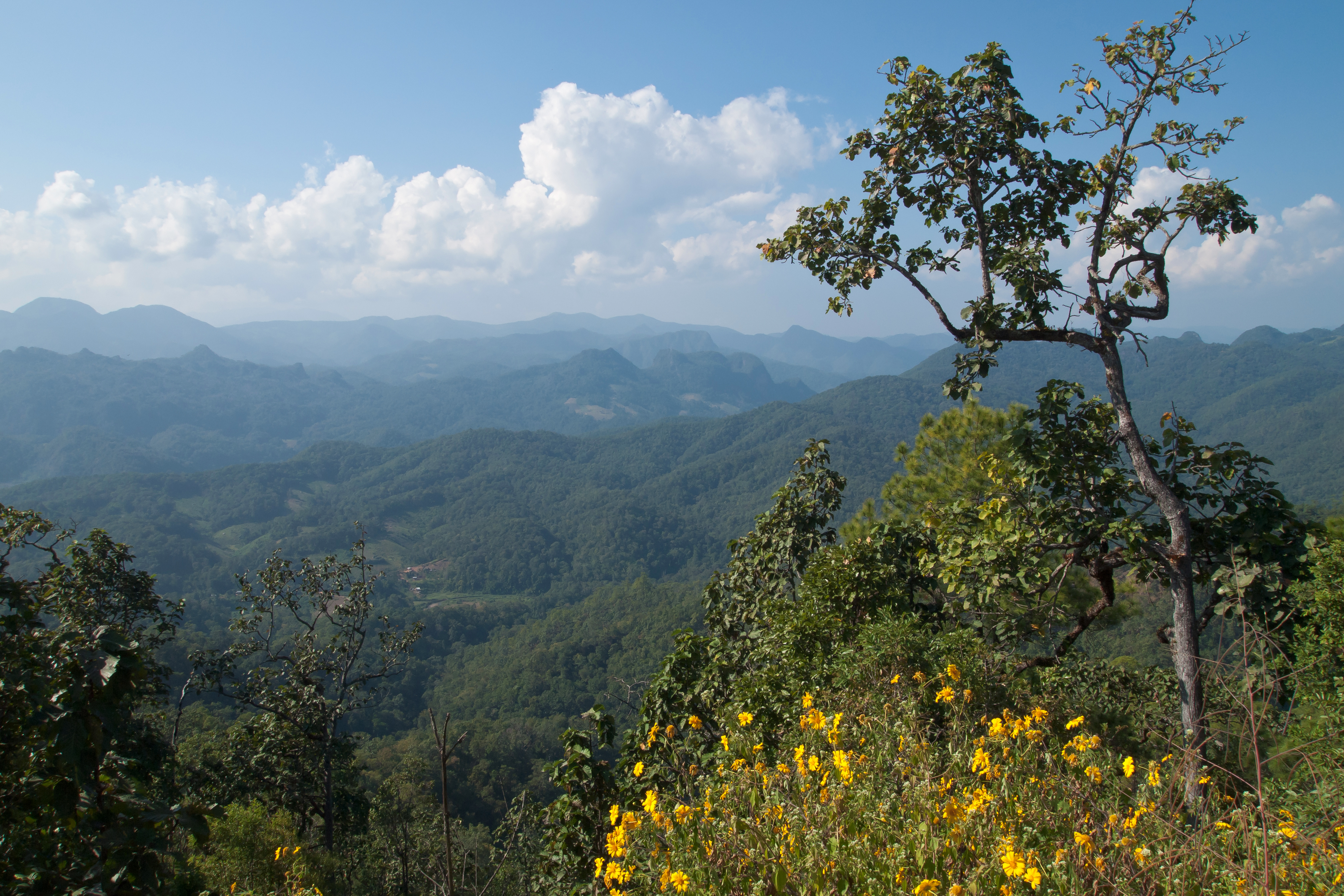
Mountains near border with Myanmar

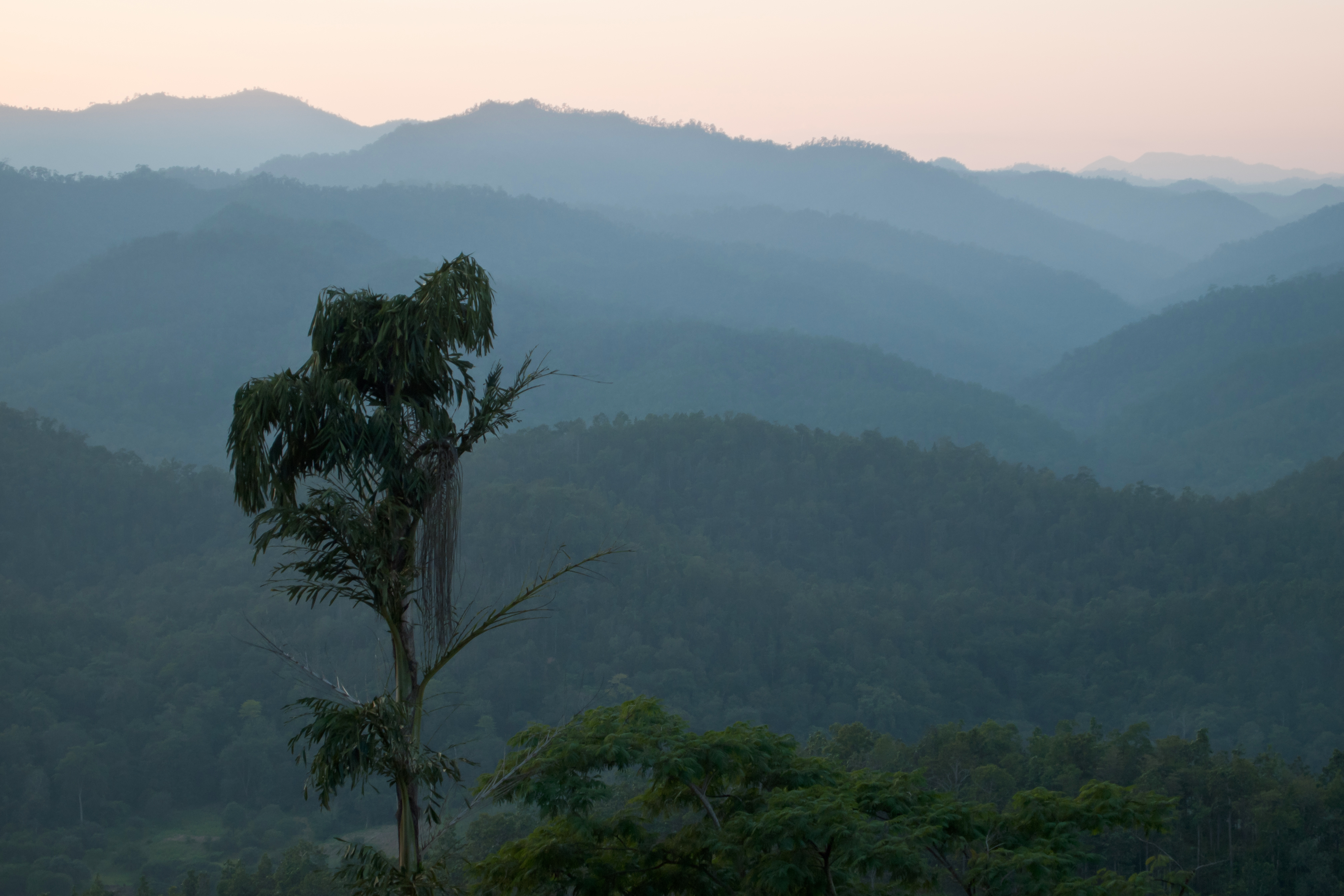
Mountains around Mae Hong Son at twilight

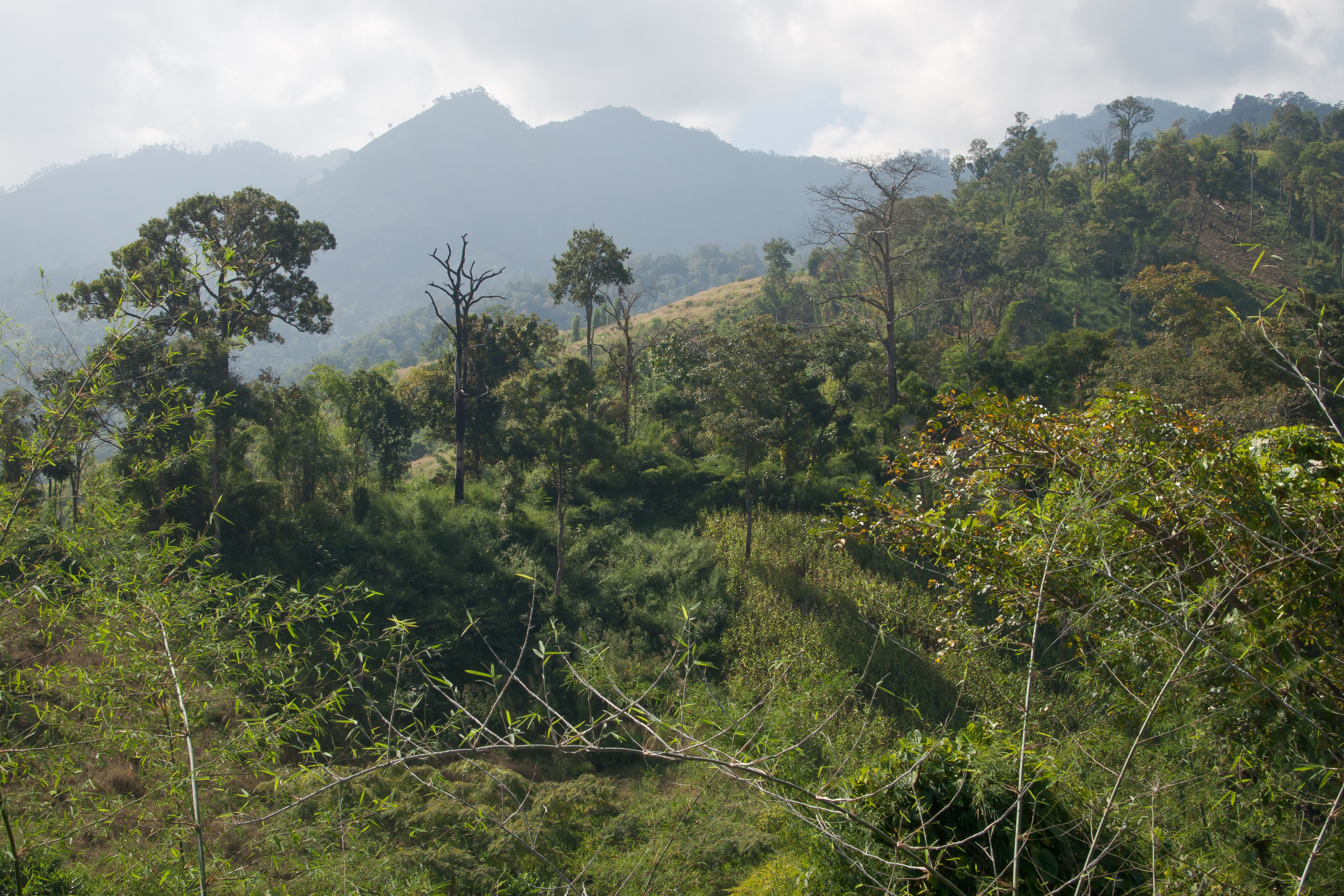
Huai Nam Dang National Park

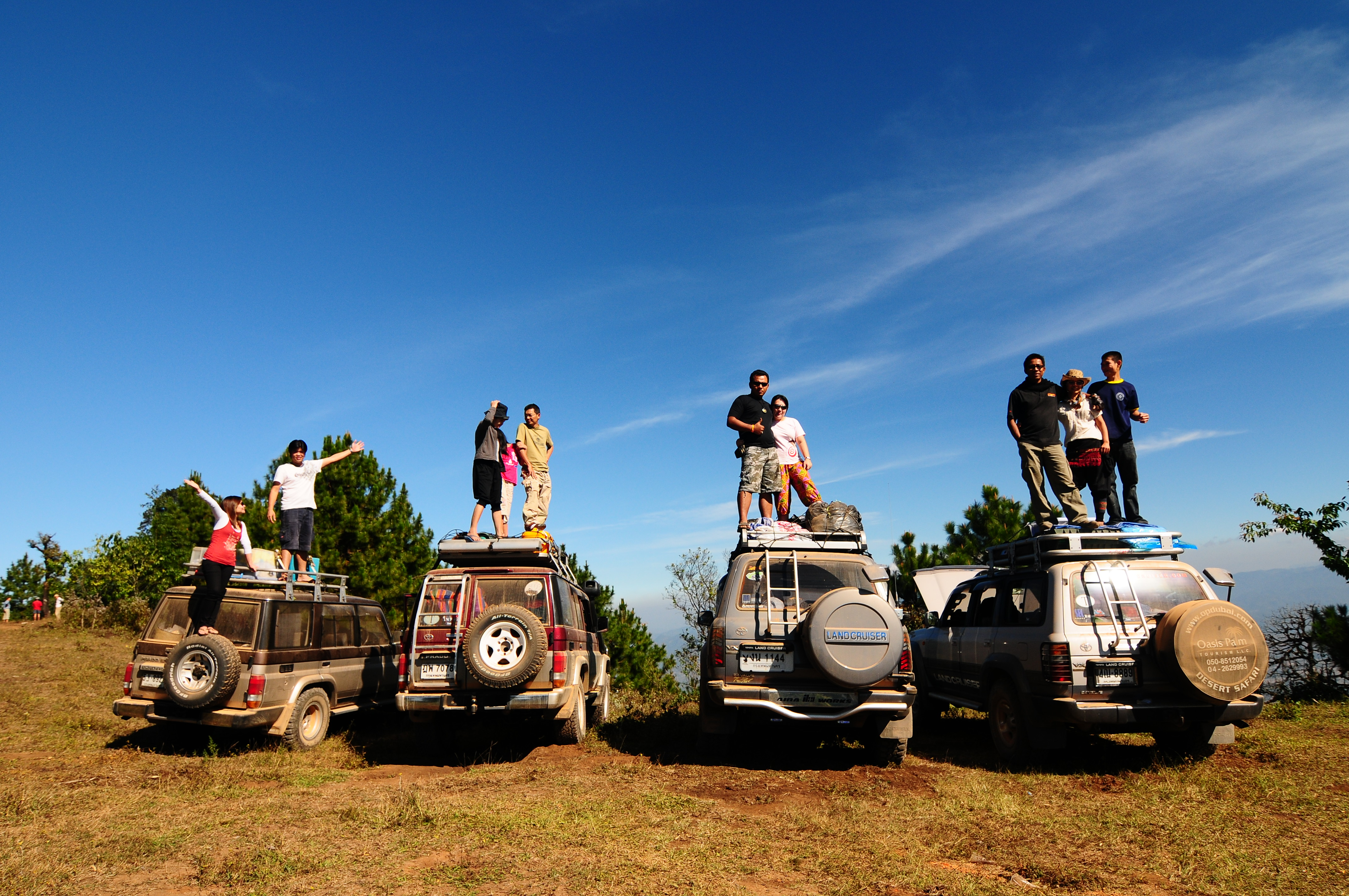
Entrance of Doi Kham-Wiang Haeng viewpoint, the border of Mae Hong Son and Chiang Mai

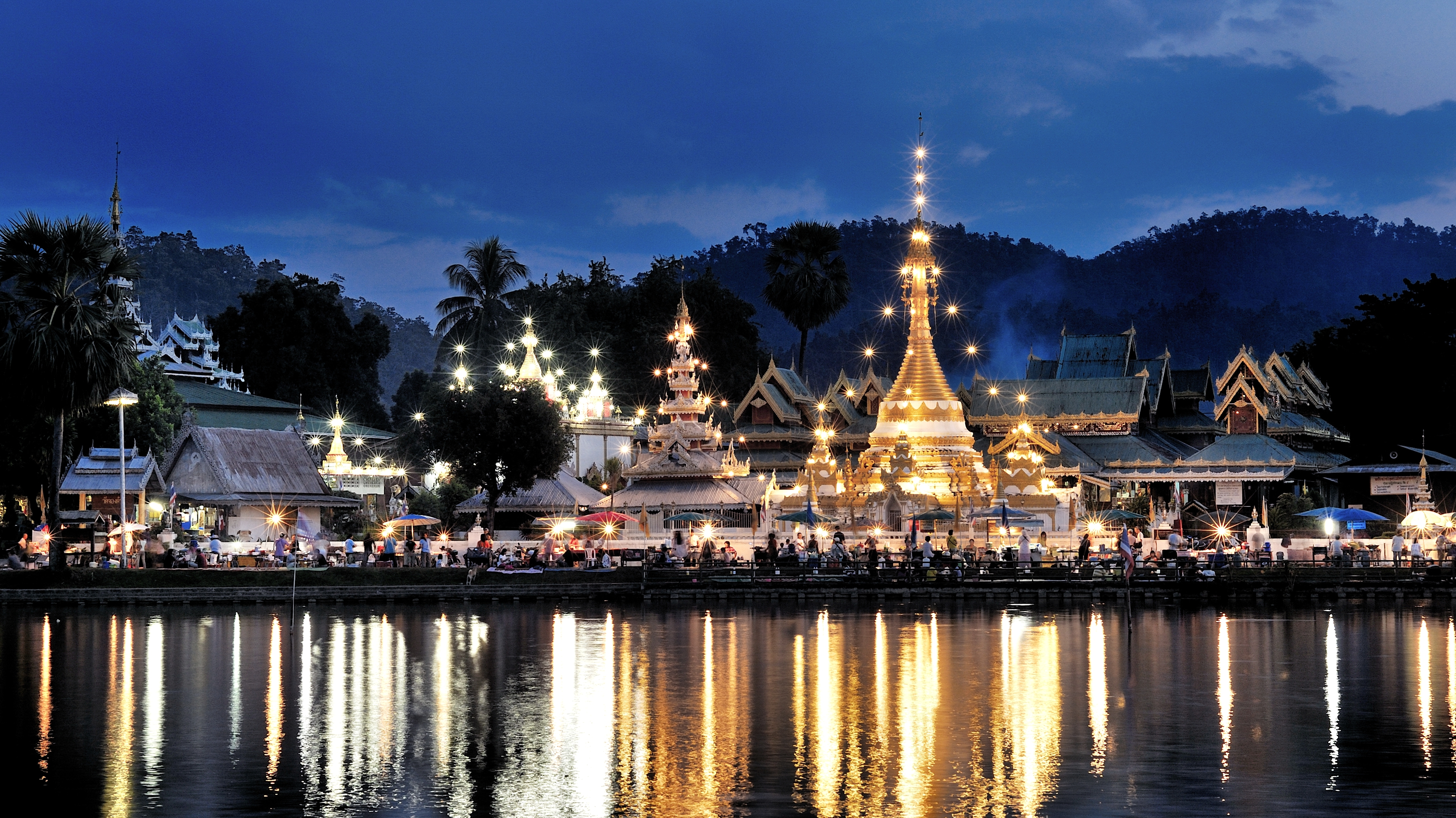
Reflections on the water surface of the lake in front of Wat Chong Klang, a temple in Mueang Mae Hong Son

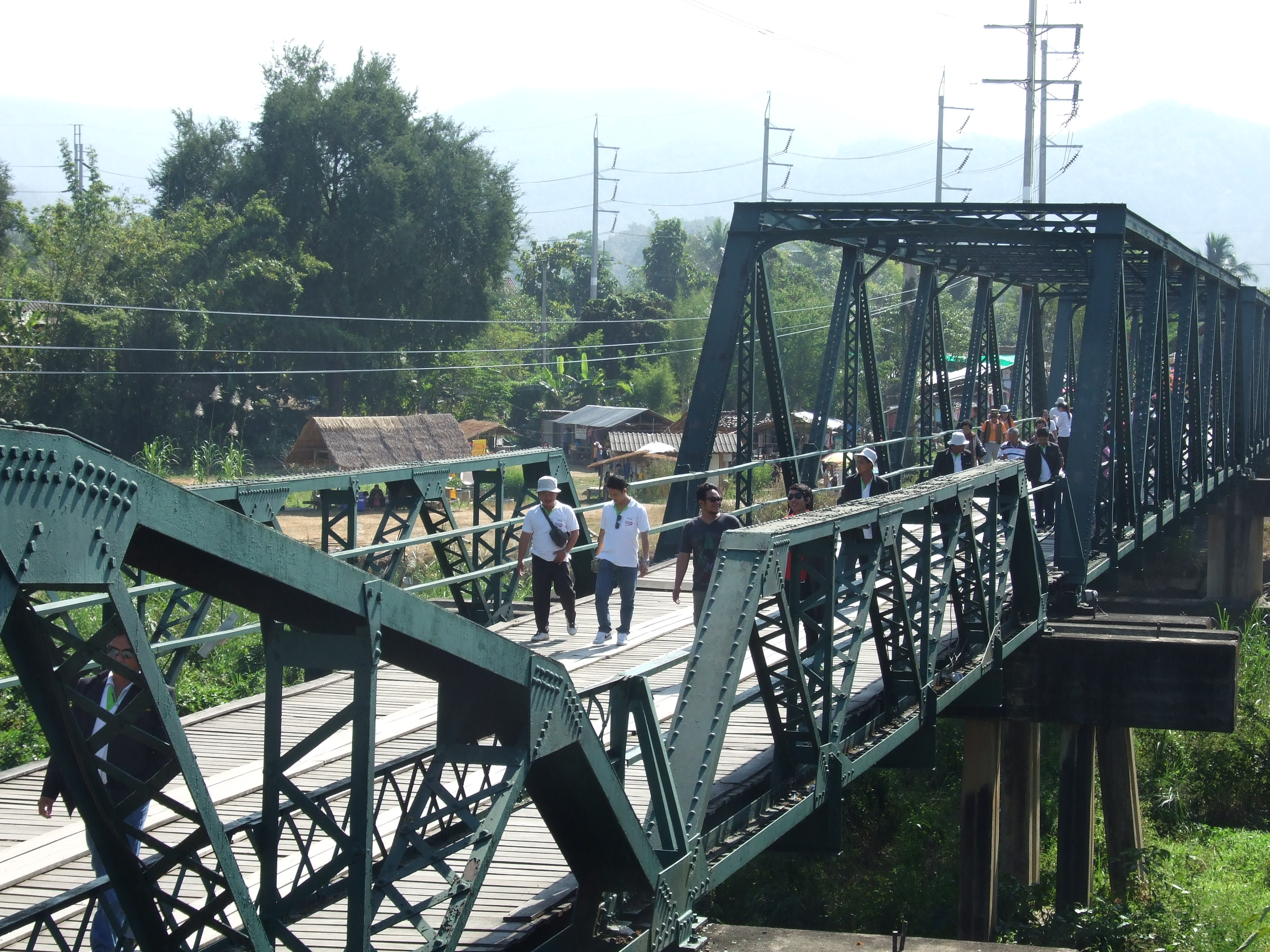
Historic Pai Memorial Bridge in Pai

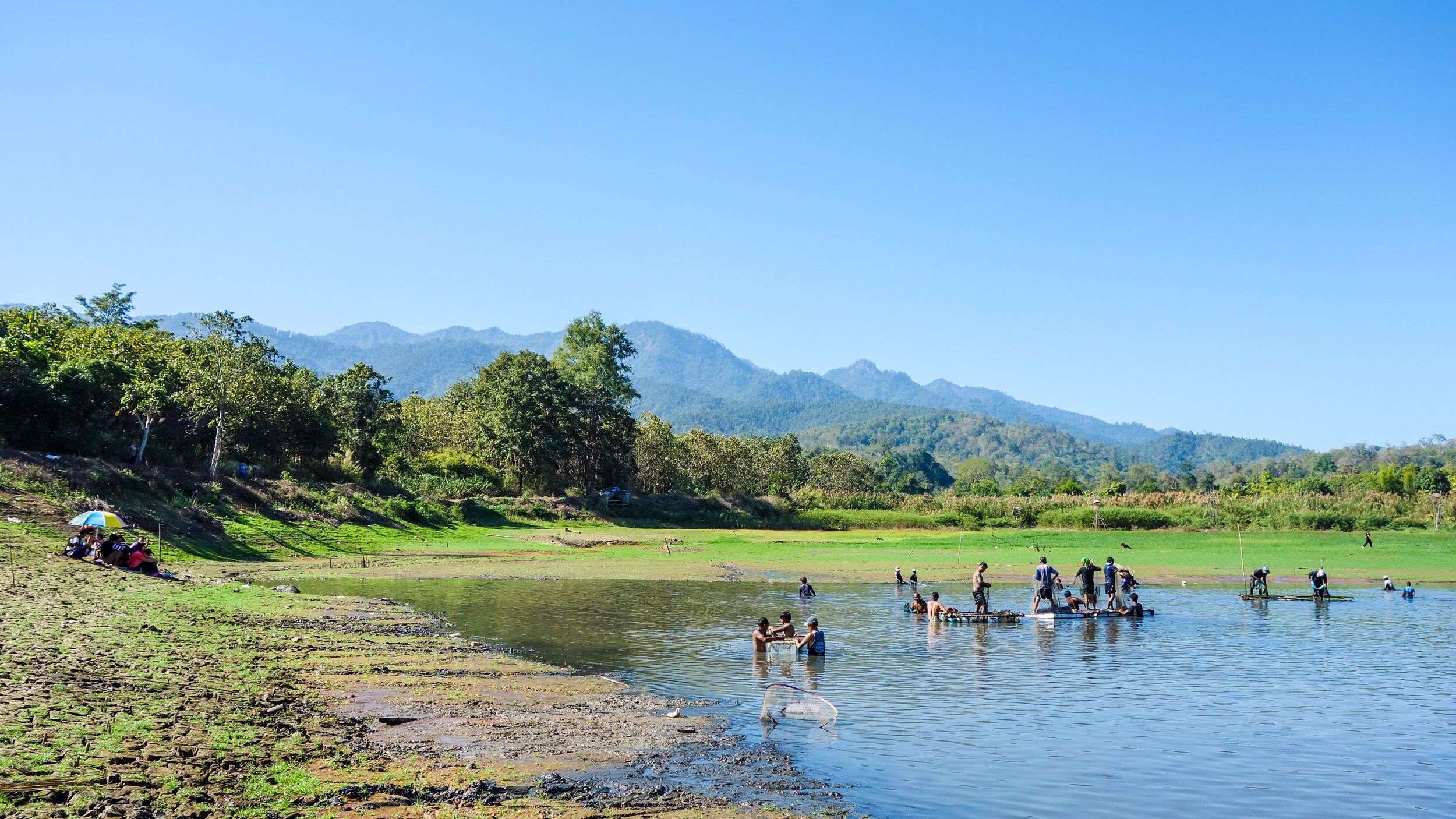
Pai River

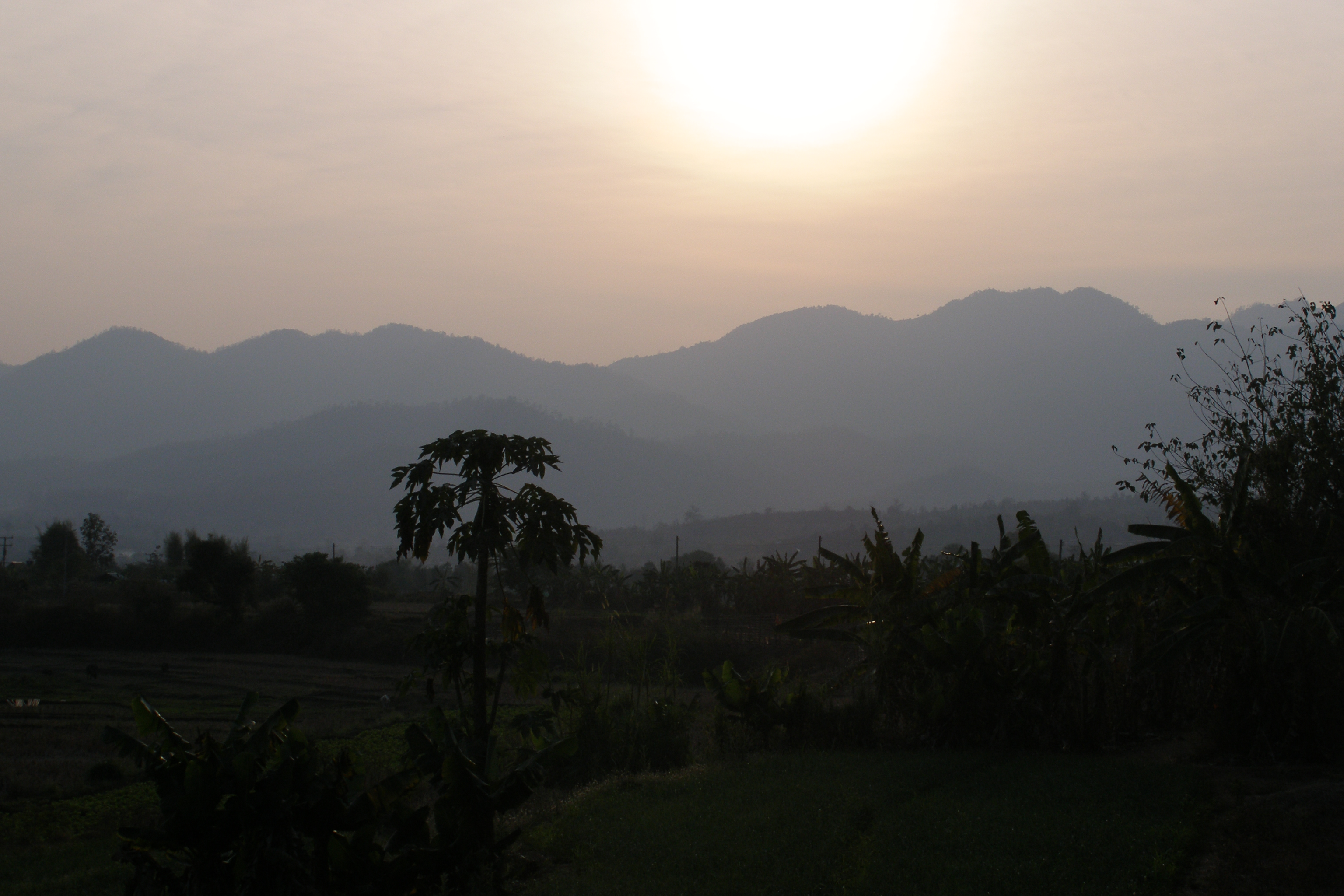
Pai countryside

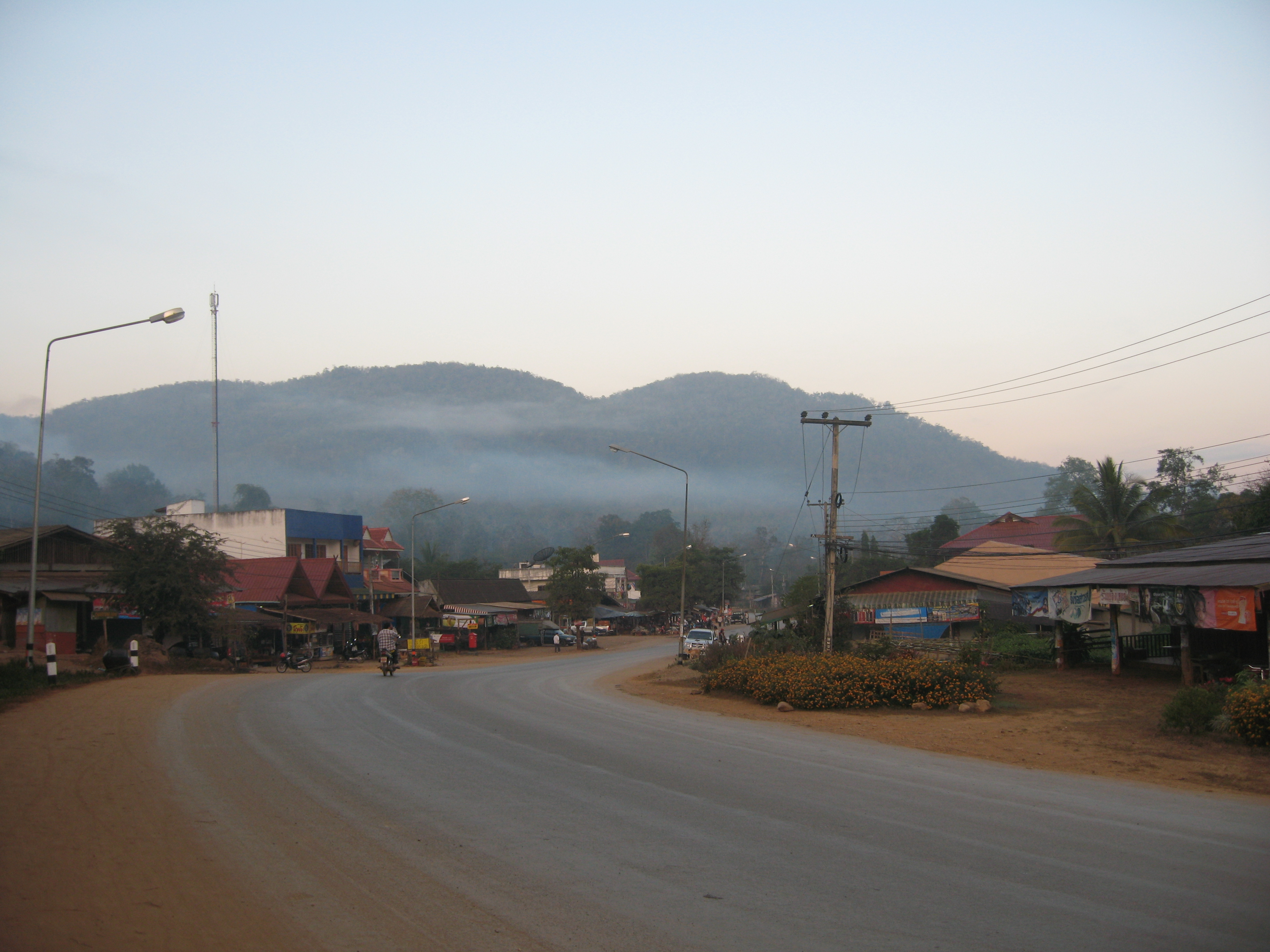
Morning atmosphere in Pang Mapha

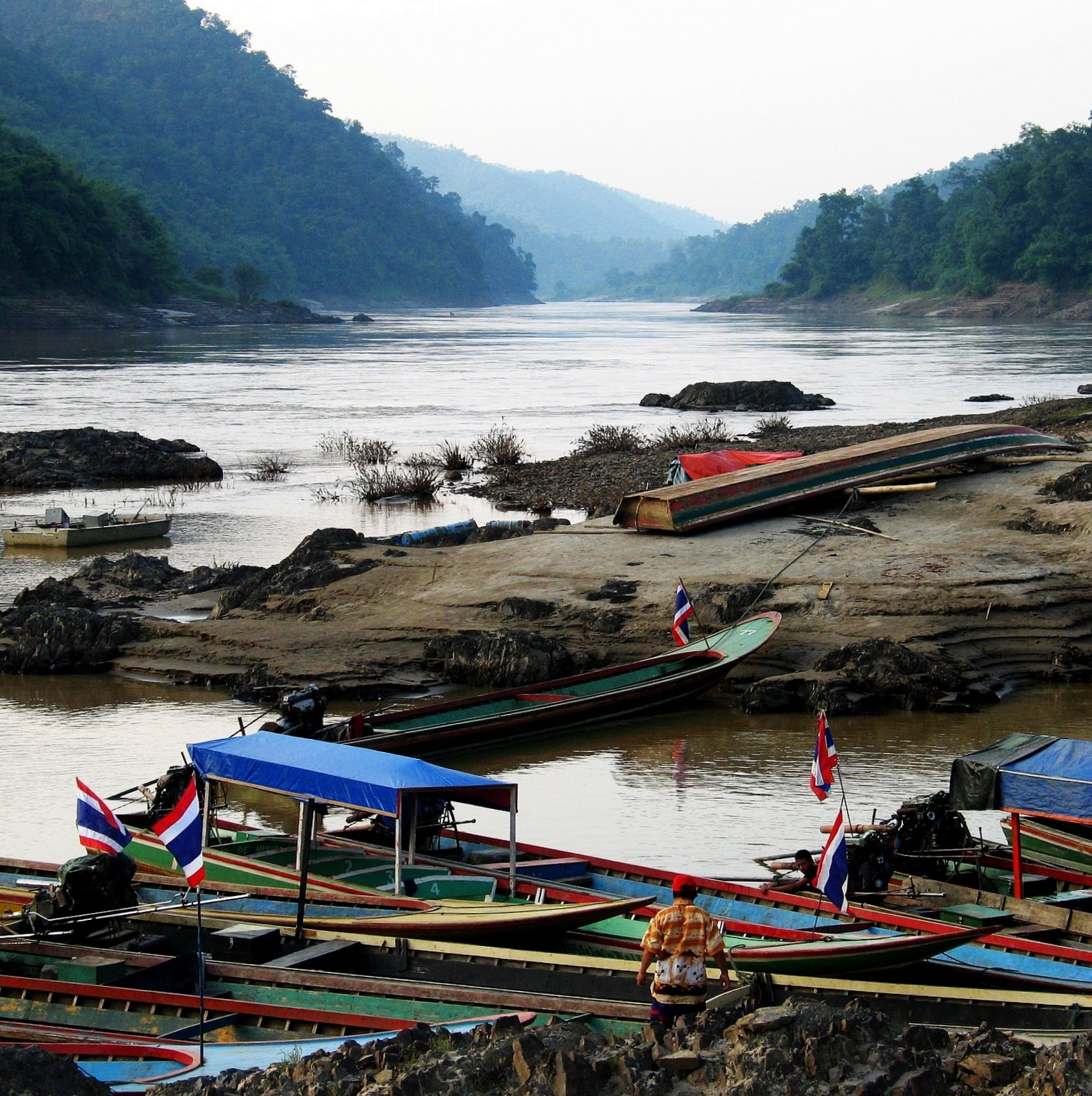
Salween River at Mae Sam Laep, Sop Moei District. Left is Myanmar.

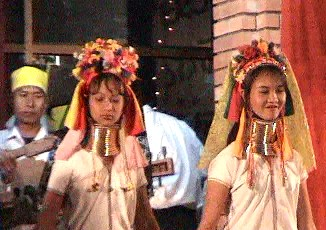
Long Neck Karen, a tribal group who living on the hills on the Mae Hong Son-Myanmar border.

== See also ==
- Nai Soi Community Learning Center
