= Salawin Wildlife Sanctuary =

- เขตรักษาพันธุ์สัตว์ป่าสาละวิน
- IUCN category IV (habitat/species management area)
- Location within Thailand
- Location: Thailand
- Nearest city: Mae Hong Son
- Coordinates: 18°12′30″N 97°44′15″E
- Area: 875 km^{2} (338 sq mi)
- Established: 1978
- Governing body: Wildlife Conservation Office

The Salawin Wildlife Sanctuary is wildlife sanctuary in northern Thailand near the border with Myanmar and includes the Thai section of the Salween River. It was founded in 1978 and is 875 km^{2} (338 sq mi) in size.

== Location ==
Salawin Wildlife Sanctuary in overview PARO 16 (Mae Sariang branch)

9) Salawin Wildlife Sanctuary in overview PARO 16 (Mae Sariang branch)

	National park
1	Mae Ngao
2	Mae Sariang
3	Namtok Mae Surin
4	Salawin
5	Tham Pla–Namtok Pha Suea
	Wildlife sanctuary
6	Doi Wiang La
7	Lum Nam Pai
8	Mae Yuam Fang Khwa
9	Salawin
10	San Pan Daen

	Non-hunting area
11	Lum Nam Pai Fang Sai
	Forest park
12	Kaeo Komon
13	Mai sak Yai
14	Namtok Huai Mae Saed
15	Namtok Klo Kho
16	Namtok Mae Sawan Noi
17	Namtok Mae Yuam Luang
18	Namtok Mai Sang Nam
19	Pha Hin Tang
20	Tham Tara Lod
21	Thung Bua Tong

	Arboretum
22	Doi Mak Hin Hom
23	Huai Chom Phu
24	Mae Surin
25	Pong Khae
