= Salawin National Park =

National park in Thailand

- อุทยานแห่งชาติสาละวิน
- IUCN category II (national park)
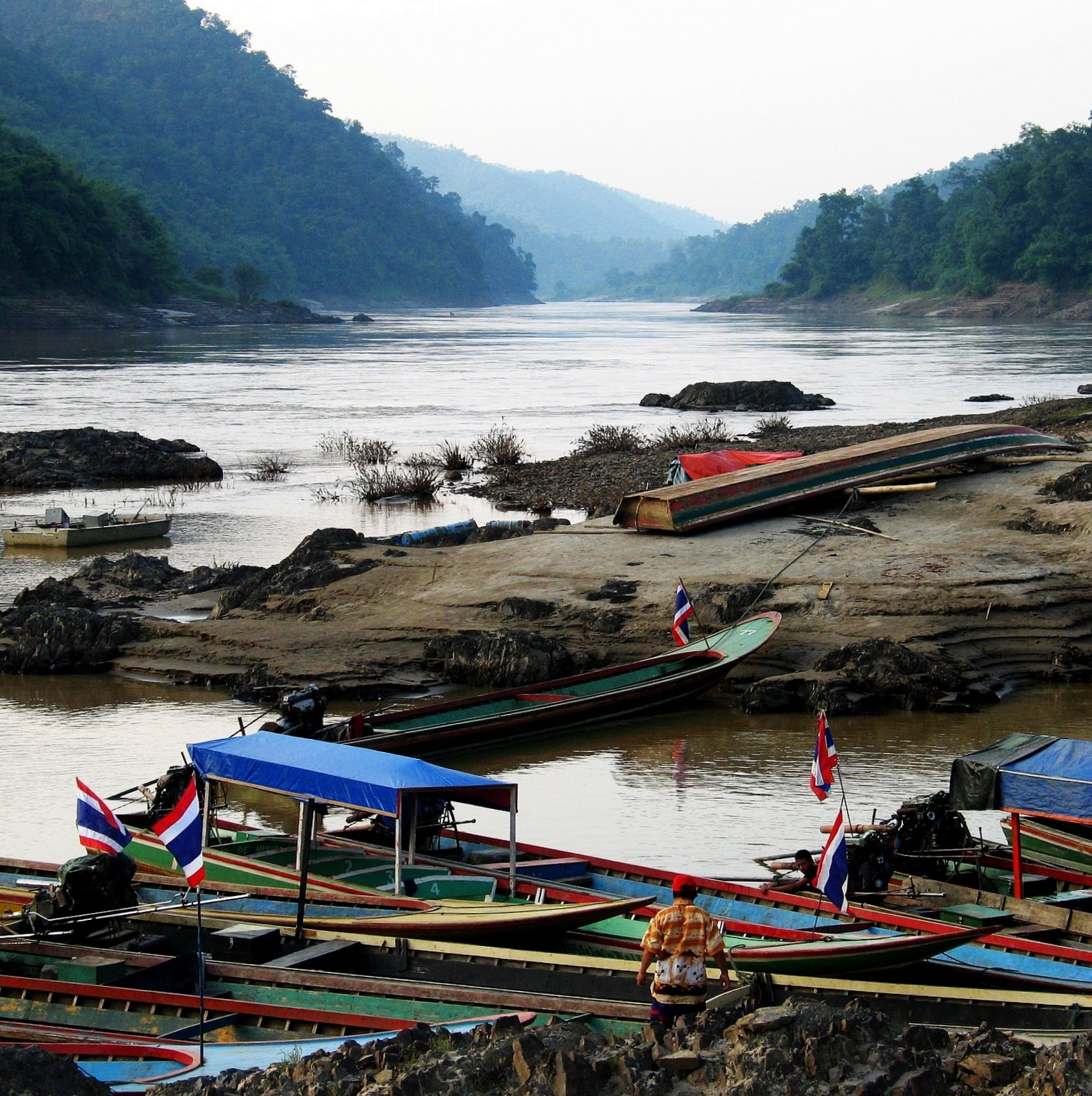
- The Salawin River at Mae Sam Laep, a village located within the park

- Location within Thailand
- Location: Mae Hong Son
- Coordinates: 18°05′N 97°45′E
- Area: 721 km^{2} (278 sq mi)
- Established: 1994
- Visitors: 2,054 (in 2019)
- Governing body: Department of National Parks, Wildlife and Plant Conservation

The Salawin National Park or Salween National Park (Thai: อุทยานแห่งชาติสาละวิน) is located in Mae Sariang and Sop Moei Districts in Mae Hong Son Province, northern Thailand, adjacent to its border with Burma. Much of the Thai part of the Salween River is included in the 721 square kilometres (278 sq mi) park.

The terrain includes the mountainous forested area of the Dawna Range and the rocky river. Populated areas within the park include the Karen village of Ta Tar Fan, and the riverside village of Mae Sam Laep.

== Topography ==
Landscape is mostly covered by mountains and forests, the height ranged from 200 metres (660 ft) to 1,100 metres (3,600 ft). Doi Khun Mae Kon is with 1,109 metres (3,638 ft) the highest peak in the park. This part of the Thanon Thong Chai Range is the origin to tributaries of the Salween, Yuam, Kong Kha, Mae Ngae and Han rivers.

== Climate ==
The climate of Salween National park is as follows: Summer is from March to May, Rainy season is from June to October and Winter is from November to February.

== History ==
In 1989 a survey was set up for Mae Yuam forest and Salween forest. The announcement of the establishment of the Salween National park has been approved in 1993. Later in 1994 Salween National Park with an area of 450,950 rai ~ 721 square kilometres (278 sq mi) was declared the 78th national park.

== Flora ==
Thailand's second-largest teak tree is located in the park. In 1997, an illegal logging scandal, involving forestry and military officials, was uncovered at the park. Almost a third of its trees, and that of the Salawin Wildlife Sanctuary, were logged between 1996 and 1998.

The park is home to the following forest types:
Deciduous forest include:

- mai ching chan
- teak

Dipterocarp forest include:

- Andaman redwood
- Dipterocarpus obtusifolius
- Dipterocarpus tuberculatus
- mai daeng
- makha
- Pterocarpus macrocarpus
- Shorea siamensis
- Siamese sal
- takhian

== Fauna ==
Mammal sorts include:

- Barking deer
- Bear
- Black giant squirrel
- Gibbon
- Gaur
- Hare
- Palm civet
- Sambar deer
- Serow
- Tiger
- Treeshrew
- Wild boar

Birds, of which species of passerines include:

- Brown shrike
- Dark-necked tailorbird
- Sooty-headed bulbul
- White wagtail

Species of non-passerines include:

- Dollarbird
- Kingfisher

Butterflies species include:

- Common birdwing
- Common mormon
- Common sailor
- Common sergeant
- Magpie crow
- Orange oakleaf
- Red helen

== Location ==
Salawin National Park in overview PARO 16 (Mae Sariang branch)

4) Salawin National Park in overview PARO 16 (Mae Sariang branch)

	National park
1	Mae Ngao
2	Mae Sariang
3	Namtok Mae Surin
4	Salawin
5	Tham Pla–Namtok Pha Suea
	Wildlife sanctuary
6	Doi Wiang La
7	Lum Nam Pai
8	Mae Yuam Fang Khwa
9	Salawin
10	San Pan Daen

	Non-hunting area
11	Lum Nam Pai Fang Sai
	Forest park
12	Kaeo Komon
13	Mai sak Yai
14	Namtok Huai Mae Saed
15	Namtok Klo Kho
16	Namtok Mae Sawan Noi
17	Namtok Mae Yuam Luang
18	Namtok Mai Sang Nam
19	Pha Hin Tang
20	Tham Tara Lod
21	Thung Bua Tong

	Arboretum
22	Doi Mak Hin Hom
23	Huai Chom Phu
24	Mae Surin
25	Pong Khae

== See also ==
- List of national parks of Thailand
- DNP - Salawin National Park
- List of Protected Areas Regional Offices of Thailand
