= Mae Hong Son =

Town in Thailand

Mae Hong Son แม่ฮ่องสอน ᨾᩯ᩵ᩁᩬ᩵ᨦᩈᩬᩁ
- Town
- เมืองแม่ฮองสอน ᨾᩮᩬᩥᨦᨾᩯ᩵ᩁᩬ᩵ᨦᩈᩬᩁ
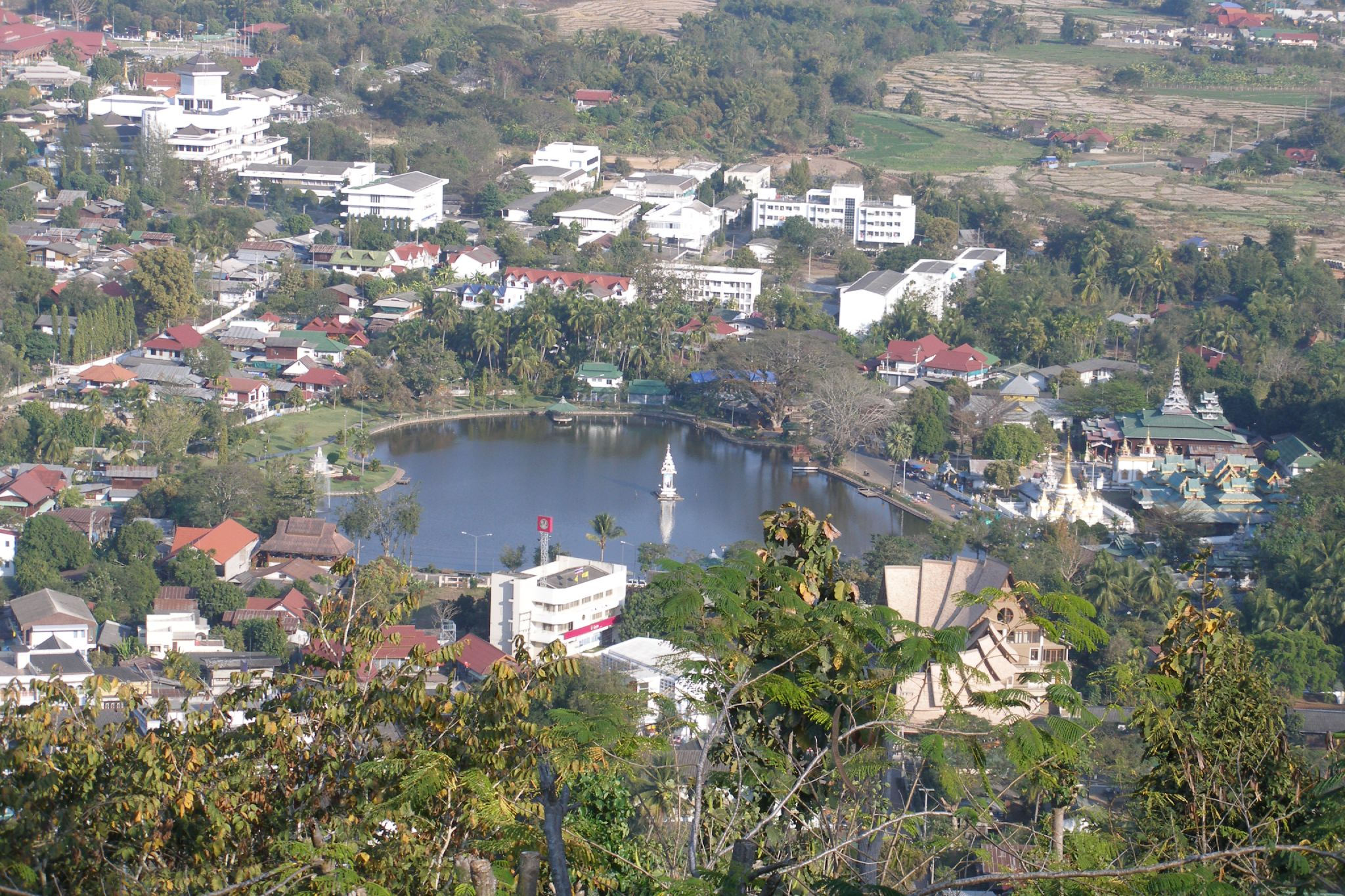
- Mae Hong Son from above

- Location within Thailand
- Coordinates: 19°18′4″N 97°58′12″E
- Country: Thailand
- Provinces: Mae Hong Son Province
- Amphoe: Amphoe Mueang Mae Hong Son
- Elevation: 240 m (790 ft)

Population (2018)
  - Total: 7,066
- Time zone: UTC+7 (ICT)

Mae Hong Son (Northern Thai: ᨾᩯ᩵ᩁᩬ᩵ᨦᩈᩬᩁ; Thai: แม่ฮ่องสอน, pronounced [mɛ̂ː hɔ̂ŋ sɔ̌ːn]) is a town (thesaban mueang) in north-west Thailand, capital of Mae Hong Son Province. It is in the Shan Hills, near the border with Burma along the banks of the River Pai. As of 2018, the town had 7,066 inhabitants. The town covers the tambon Chong Kham of the Mueang Mae Hong Son district. Mae Hong Son is 883 kilometres (549 mi) north of Bangkok and 251 kilometres (156 mi) northwest of Chiang Mai.

Mae Hong Son
- "Mae Hong Son" in Thai language (top) and Northern Thai with Tai Tham script (bottom)

Thai name
- Thai: แม่ฮองสอน
- RTGS: Mae Hong Son

Northern Thai name
- Northern Thai: ᨾᩯ᩵ᩁᩬ᩵ᨦᩈᩬᩁ (Mae Hong Son)

== History ==
The territory of Mae Hong Son Province was formerly part of Mawkmai State, one of the Shan States which had been founded in 1767 by Hsai Khiao, hailing from a noble family of Chiang Mai.

As a result of the Anglo-Siamese Boundary Commission of 1892-93 Mae Hong Son district was ceded to Siam, but the adjacent Möngmaü and Mehsakun trans-Salween districts— also claimed by Siam as territories located on the eastern side of the Salween River— were kept as part of British Burma.

== Climate ==
Mae Hong Son has a tropical savanna climate (Köppen climate classification Aw). Winters are dry and warm. Temperatures rise until April, which is very hot with the average daily maximum at 38.7 °C (101.7 °F). The monsoon season runs from May through October, with heavy rain and somewhat cooler temperatures during the day, although nights remain warm. Mae Hong Son holds the highest temperature ever recorded in Thailand when 44.6 °C (112.3 °F) was observed on 28 April 2016.

=== Temperature ===
Climate data for Mae Hong Son (1991–2020, extremes 1951-present)
Month	Jan	Feb	Mar	Apr	May	Jun	Jul	Aug	Sep	Oct	Nov	Dec	Year
Record high °C (°F)	37.5 (99.5)	39.6 (103.3)	42.1 (107.8)	44.6 (112.3)	44.0 (111.2)	40.5 (104.9)	38.1 (100.6)	37.3 (99.1)	37.7 (99.9)	37.1 (98.8)	37.1 (98.8)	37.1 (98.8)	44.6 (112.3)
Mean daily maximum °C (°F)	29.8 (85.6)	33.3 (91.9)	36.9 (98.4)	38.9 (102.0)	36.3 (97.3)	33.6 (92.5)	32.4 (90.3)	32.1 (89.8)	32.9 (91.2)	32.7 (90.9)	31.0 (87.8)	28.8 (83.8)	33.2 (91.8)
Daily mean °C (°F)	20.8 (69.4)	22.7 (72.9)	26.8 (80.2)	30.3 (86.5)	29.2 (84.6)	27.9 (82.2)	27.2 (81.0)	27.0 (80.6)	27.2 (81.0)	26.5 (79.7)	24.2 (75.6)	21.4 (70.5)	25.9 (78.7)
Mean daily minimum °C (°F)	14.5 (58.1)	14.7 (58.5)	18.2 (64.8)	22.9 (73.2)	23.9 (75.0)	24.0 (75.2)	23.7 (74.7)	23.5 (74.3)	23.3 (73.9)	22.2 (72.0)	19.4 (66.9)	16.2 (61.2)	20.5 (69.0)
Record low °C (°F)	6.0 (42.8)	6.3 (43.3)	10.8 (51.4)	15.5 (59.9)	18.9 (66.0)	20.5 (68.9)	20.1 (68.2)	20.0 (68.0)	19.7 (67.5)	14.9 (58.8)	7.3 (45.1)	3.3 (37.9)	3.3 (37.9)
Average precipitation mm (inches)	11.0 (0.43)	5.5 (0.22)	19.2 (0.76)	59.6 (2.35)	168.9 (6.65)	180.1 (7.09)	226.4 (8.91)	258.5 (10.18)	200.5 (7.89)	116.8 (4.60)	39.6 (1.56)	10.9 (0.43)	1,297 (51.1)
Average precipitation days (≥ 1 mm)	1.0	0.5	1.4	4.3	13.6	17.0	20.4	20.7	15.5	10.0	3.4	1.2	109
Average relative humidity (%)	75.8	66.3	56.7	56.0	71.0	79.6	82.5	84.1	83.1	81.7	80.2	79.3	74.7
Average dew point °C (°F)	15.7 (60.3)	15.0 (59.0)	16.1 (61.0)	19.4 (66.9)	22.7 (72.9)	23.8 (74.8)	23.8 (74.8)	23.9 (75.0)	23.8 (74.8)	22.9 (73.2)	20.3 (68.5)	17.2 (63.0)	20.4 (68.7)
Mean monthly sunshine hours	272.8	274.0	313.1	279.0	198.4	120.0	62.0	117.8	108.0	179.8	216.0	251.1	2,392
Source 1: NOAA
Source 2: Thai Meteorological Department (Feb–May record highs 1951-2023 and Nov-Feb record lows 1951–2022, extremes 1981-2010) Office of Water Management and Hydrology, Royal Irrigation Department (sun 1981–2010)

== Transportation ==
Mae Hong Son can be reached by car or bus from Chiang Mai by the Mae Hong Son loop. The town is also serviced by the Mae Hong Son Airport. It is also home to the only commercial Diesel power station in Thailand. The station has only a very small capacity of 4.40 MW (4,400 kW). It seems like it was placed here because of the remote location of the town.

== Tourism ==
The town has some tourist infrastructure, including many guesthouses and several internet cafes. It also has a vegetarian restaurant near the main market.

It is a popular jumping-off point for tours to visit hill tribe villages, caves, and waterfalls in the area. There are also some hot springs nearby.

"Thung Dok Bua Tong" in Amphoe Khun Yuam, where the fields of wild sunflowers bloom and cover the hills during the month of November, is best reached from Mae Hong Son and lies some 80 km away.
