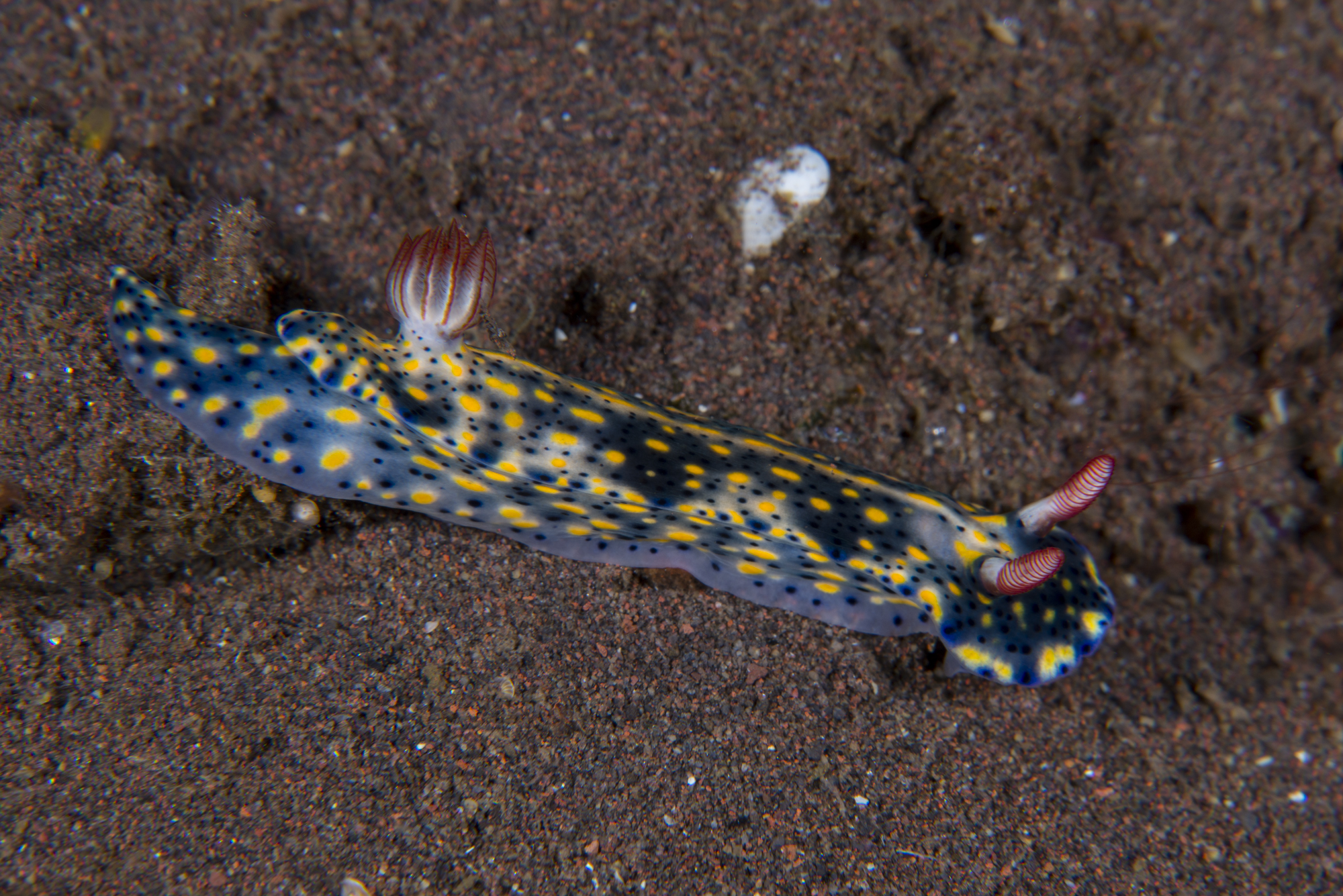
- Tulamben, Bali, Indonesia

Scientific classification
- Kingdom: Animalia
- Phylum: Mollusca
- Class: Gastropoda
- Order: Nudibranchia
- Family: Chromodorididae
- Genus: Hypselodoris
- Species: H. infucata

Binomial name
- Hypselodoris infucata (Rüppell & Leuckart, 1831) (Note: The date on this is also sometimes quoted as either 1830 or 1828.)

= Hypselodoris infucata =

Species of sea slug

Hypselodoris infucata is a species of colourful sea slug or dorid nudibranch, a marine gastropod mollusk in the family Chromodorididae.

This species eats sponges.

== Distribution ==
This nudibranch was described from the Red Sea. It is found from the Red Sea and western Indian Ocean eastwards as far as the Hawaiian islands, throughout the tropical Indo-West Pacific. The species now also occurs in the Mediterranean, having invaded as a Lessepsian migrant through the Suez Canal.

== Description ==
Hypselodoris infucata has a translucent white body pigmented on the surface with blotches of grey-blue, large yellow spots and small black spots. The gills are white with a single line of red pigment on the outer surfaces. The rhinophores are opaque white, with red edges to the lamellae and a red line at the front of the club. This species can reach a total length of at least 50 mm. It is distinguished from the similar species Hypselodoris kanga, Hypselodoris roo and Hypselodoris confetti most easily by the fact that they all have gills which have an outer face which has two edges, forming a triangle.
