= Mae Na Toeng =

Coordinates: 19°24′N 98°26′E

Mae Na Toeng แม่นาเติง
- Subdistrict
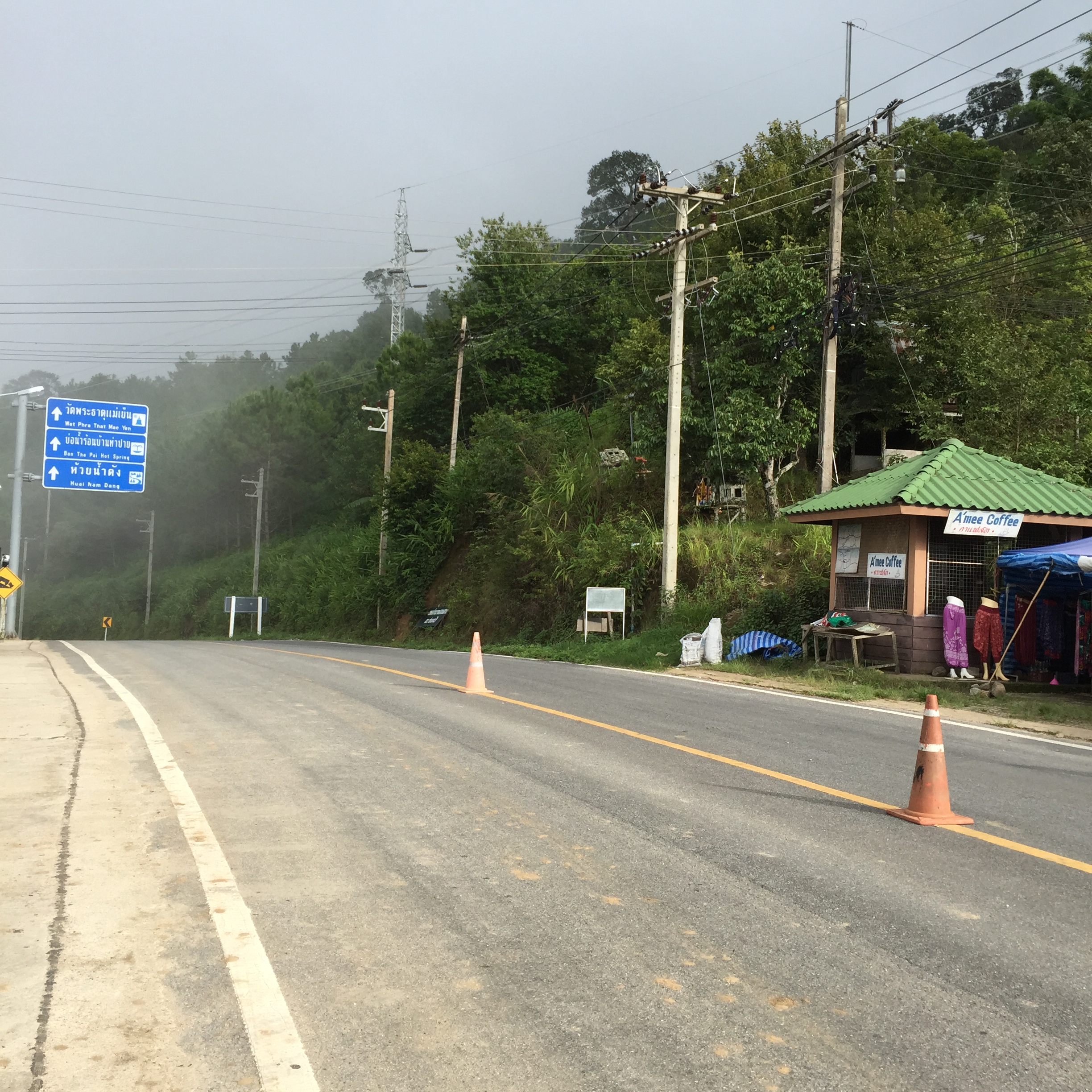
- Thailand Route 1095
- Interactive map of Mae Na Toeng
- Country: Thailand
- Province: Mae Hong Son
- District: Pai

Population (2005)
  - Total: 6,417
- Time zone: UTC+7 (ICT)

Mae Na Toeng (Thai: แม่นาเติง) is a village and tambon (sub-district) of Pai District, in Mae Hong Son Province, Thailand. In 2005 it had a population of 6,417 people. The tambon contains 14 villages.
