= Pai Airport =

Airport in northern Thailand

Pai Airport ท่าอากาศยานปาย
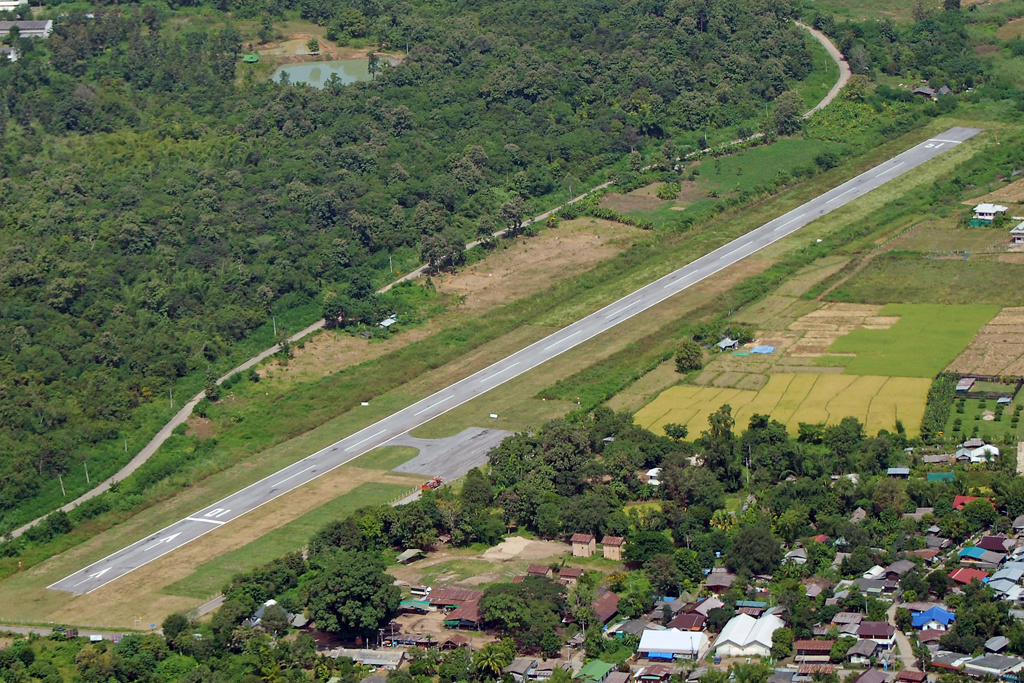
- IATA: PYY; ICAO: VTCI

Summary
- Airport type: Public
- Operator: Department of Airports; Ministry of Natural Resources and Environment
- Serves: Pai
- Location: Tambon Wiang Tai, Amphoe Pai, Mae Hong Son, Thailand
- Opened: 1947; 79 years ago
- Coordinates: 19°22′22″N 098°26′19″E
- Website: minisite.airports.go.th/pai

Map
- Location of airport in Thailand

Runways
Direction	Length		Surface
Direction	m	ft	Surface
01/19	1,000	3,280	Asphalt

Statistics (2019)
- Passengers: 1,032

Pai Airport (IATA: PYY, ICAO: VTCI) is an inactive regional airport located in Wiang Tai tambon, Pai district, Mae Hong Son province, Northern Thailand.

Located on a 72.3-rai area around a kilometre away from Mueang Mae Hong Son, the capital district of the province, the airport has one runway (23 metres wide, 1,000 metres long).

== History ==
Pai Airport was purpose-built in 1947 for a visit by Field Marshal Phibun. In 2007, its runway was paved, and it was extended to 200 meters by February 2011. In early 2017, an expansion of the airport was considered by the government in order to increase tourism, but it was ultimately denied after opposition from locals.

== Airlines and destinations ==
Since Kan Air discontinued all flights in April 2017, there has been no commercial airline service to Pai.
