= Ko Pha-ngan Airport =

Unfinished airport in Ko Pha-ngan, Thailand

- IATA: none; ICAO: none

Summary
- Airport type: Public
- Owner: Kan Air
- Operator: Kan Air
- Serves: Ko Pha-ngan
- Location: Ko Pha-ngan, Surat Thani Province, Thailand
- Hub for: Kan Air
- Coordinates: 9.7375°N 100.0792°E

Map
- Location of airport in Thailand

Runways
| Direction | Length | | Surface |
| Direction | ft | m | Surface |
|---|---|---|---|
| | | 1,100 | Asphalt |

Ko Pha-ngan Airport is an unfinished airport that was under construction in 2012–2015 on Ko Pha-ngan, Surat Thani Province, Thailand. The airport was being built by Kan Air, a domestic Thai airline, who were reportedly spending 700-900 million baht. Kan Air planned to introduce flights to Ko Pha-ngan's neighboring islands, Ko Samui and Ko Tao, as well as three 80-minute flights daily to and from Bangkok's Don Mueang Airport. Construction was suspended indefinitely due to alleged illegal encroachment of National Park land.

== Construction ==
The airport was scheduled for completion in September 2014. Construction was halted in 2015 when authorities claimed that the airport had infringed on a 20 rai portion of Than Sadet-Ko Pha-ngan National Park. In 2015 the area for the runway was cleared of trees and flattened and there has been no further construction since then.

In 2016, Kan Air announced that they are seeking a capital injection of 1.5 billion baht to complete the airport. The airport's developer reportedly spent 2 billion Thai baht on the unfinished construction.

Construction works have finally been terminated, because of illegal national park land encroachment.

== Features ==
The airport was projected to have a capacity of 600,000 passengers per year. The site for the airport, with a 1,100-metre runway and thatched-roof terminal, is on the eastern side of the island. Ko Pha-ngan Airport will be open to other operators, with the same parking and landing fees as at Suvarnabhumi Airport.

If completed, the airport will provide direct air access to Ko Pha-ngan for the first time. Currently the only transportation route to Ko Pha-ngan is via ferry. The nearest airport is Samui Airport on the larger Ko Samui to the south.
