= MapJack =

Map feature introduced in 2007

- Initial release: May 2007
- Stable release: Stable
- Written in: JavaScript, WebGL
- Available in: English
- Website: Official Website

MapJack is a map feature introduced in 2007 that is similar to Google Street View, but has less coverage than Google Street View. Its headquarters is in Hong Kong. The site currently provides these types of views of various locations in Thailand.

The website was originally written in Adobe Flash, but has since been updated to modern web standards, using a WebGL powered panorama viewer.

== Regions currently included ==
Country	Locations
Thailand	Chiang Mai • Phuket • Krabi • Hua Hin • Mae Hong Son • Ayutthaya • Pai

== Regions originally included ==
Country	Locations
Canada	Mississauga • Montréal • Vancouver • Whistler • Squamish • Toronto
France	Levens
Latvia	Riga
Macau	The Venetian Macao
Malaysia	Putrajaya
Philippines	Metro Manila • Calabarzon • Subic • Baguio • Palawan
Puerto Rico	Mayagüez • Ponce • San Juan
Singapore	Singapore
Sweden	Stockholm • Gothenburg • Malmö • Borlänge • Borås • Eskilstuna • Falun • Gävle • Halmstad • Helsingborg • Jönköping • Kalmar • Karlskrona • Kristianstad • Linköping • Luleå • Lund • Norrköping • Skövde • Sundsvall • Södertälje • Trollhättan • Umeå • Uppsala • Västerås • Växjö • Örebro • Östersund
Thailand	Chiang Mai • Phuket • Krabi • Hua Hin • Mae Hong Son • Ayutthaya • Pai
United States	San Francisco Bay Area (including Sausalito) • San Jose • Yosemite National Park • Lake Tahoe • Oakland • Palo Alto • West Babylon • Las Vegas • Phoenix • Long Beach

== Awards ==
MapJack was awarded one of the 50 best web sites of 2008 by Time magazine.
