= Ko Pha-ngan =

Ko Pha-ngan เกาะพะงัน Koh Pha-ngan
- District
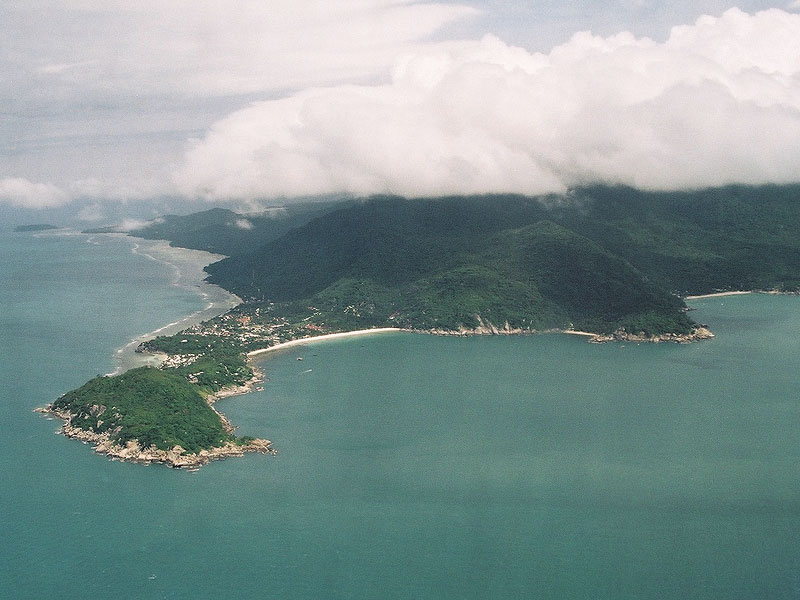
- Ko Pha-ngan

- Location within Thailand
- Coordinates: 09°44′24″N 100°01′48″E
- Country: Thailand
- Province: Surat Thani

Area
  - Total: 125 km^{2} (48 sq mi)

Population
  - Total: 10,094
- Time zone: UTC+7 (ICT)
- Area code: (+66) 77

Ko Pha-ngan (Thai: เกาะพะงัน, RTGS: Ko Pha-ngan, pronounced [kɔ̀ʔ pʰā.ŋān]) is an island in the Gulf of Thailand in Surat Thani Province of southern Thailand. Ko Pha-ngan has two sister islands: the larger Ko Samui to the south and the smaller Ko Tao to the north. The main town is Thong Sala.

== History ==
The name Ko Pha-ngan derives from the word "ngan", meaning "sandbar" in southern Thai. There are many sandbars offshore.

Ko Pha-ngan has been a longtime favorite of past kings of Thailand. King Chulalongkorn (King Rama V) visited Ko Pha-ngan 14 times during his reign.

The Bronze Drum of Dongson Culture (500–100 BCE) that was found on Ko Samui in 1977 is evidence that there were settlements of people on Ko Samui, Ko Pha-ngan, and their islets more than 2,000 years ago. Some historians and archaeologists believe that the first group to migrate to Ko Pha-ngan were Austronesian peoples who traveled by boat from the Malay Peninsula.

== Transport ==
Motorbikes are a major means of travel

Motorbikes are a major means of travel on Ko Pha-ngan.

Ko Pha-ngan is connected to Ko Samui, Ko Tao, and the mainland by regular ferry and speedboat services. Sea transportation remains the main way for visitors to travel to and from the island.

There used to be an option to reach Ko Pha-ngan by car ferry from Ko Samui (Raja Ferry Port, which is 9 km (5.6 mi) from Ko Pha-ngan) and from Donsak on the mainland.

Since 2012, Kannithi Aviation (Kan Air) has attempted to construct Ko Pha-ngan Airport on the island. Kan Air has spent 500 million baht to acquire about 32 ha (79 acres) of land to build a passenger terminal capable of handling 1,000 passengers a day and a 1,095 m (3,593 ft) runway to accommodate turboprop aircraft such as Kan Air's ATR 72-600 series. The project, originally estimated at 900 million baht, now estimated to cost two billion baht, has faced inflated costs, delays resulting from the yet-to-be-issued environmental impact assessment, and other complications, which pushed back initial plans to open in 2014.

== Administration ==
=== Central administration ===
Ko Pha-ngan together with Ko Tao and a few minor islands forms the district (amphoe) Ko Pha-ngan (148 km^{2} (57 sq mi)). The district is divided into three subdistricts (tambons), which are further subdivided into 17 administrative villages (mubans).

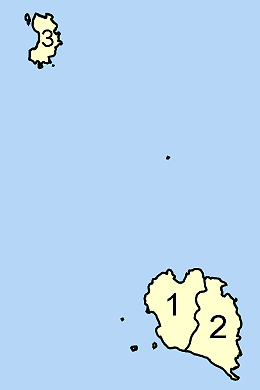
Tambons of Ko Pha-ngan district

No.	Name	Thai	Villages	Pop.
1.	Ko Pha-ngan	เกาะพะงัน	8	10,094
2.	Ban Tai	บ้านใต้	6	4,865
3.	Ko Tao	เกาะเต่า	3	2,357

=== Local administration ===
The district has four subdistrict municipalities (thesaban tambons):

- Ko Pha-ngan (Thai: เทศบาลตำบลเกาะพะงัน) consisting of parts of subdistricts Ko Pha-ngan and Ban Tai.
- Phet Pha-ngan (Thai: เทศบาลตำบลเพชรพะงัน) consisting of parts of subdistrict Ko Pha-ngan.
- Ban Tai (Thai: เทศบาลตำบลบ้านใต้) consisting of parts of subdistrict Ban Tai.
- Ko Tao (Thai: เทศบาลตำบลเกาะเต่า) consisting of subdistrict Ko Tao.

=== History ===
Originally the island was administered by Ko Samui District. The minor district (king amphoe) Ko Pha-ngan was established on 1 October 1970, then consisting of the two tambons, Ko Pha-ngan and Ban Tai. It was upgraded to a full district on 12 April 1977. Ko Tao subdistrict was established on 15 August 1982 by splitting off the three administrative villages on Ko Tao Island from Ko Phangan subdistrict.

== Environmental issues ==
As of 2018 the island receives about 458,000 visitors per year. They and the island residents generate about 7,300 tonnes of solid waste per year. Untreated wastewater discharges and ongoing coral bleaching are also issues.

The Thai government, the local government, local nonprofit organizations such as EcoThailand Foundation and Trash Hero, local businesses such as the Sea Flower Bungalows, Sarikantang Resort, and locals, both Thai citizens and expatriates, have worked for years to preserve, clean, and restore Koh Phangan, which is unique in the Gulf of Thailand.

One deputy secretary-general Noppadol Thiyajai said, "We hope the declaration will at least help maintain the environment on the islands. We understand the measure may not result in significant environmental improvements, but it is better than having nothing."

The Tourism Authority of Thailand has helped the island to be promoted as a Green Island following the strong will of its inhabitants.

The island is regularly under the spotlights for its community involving both Thai and foreigners working together for a sustainable and socially fair tourism benefiting directly the local community.

== In popular culture ==
Ko Pha-ngan featured prominently in Alex Garland's 1996 novel The Beach and is also mentioned in the 2006 song Magick by the new rave band Klaxons (but probably more as a reference to the 1996 novel The Beach than the island itself).

DJ/producer Ashley Wallbridge titled his 2012 song "Kopanang", an anglicized version of Ko Pha-ngan.

Drain Gang collaborative album Trash Island was created on Ko Pha-ngan, with most of its tracks being recorded in a vacation home on the island, and a set of individual covers of each song also shot on various points on the island. The album cover is a picture of a trash fire occurring on the island at the time.

In season three of The White Lotus, several characters attend a full moon party on Ko Pha-ngan.

== Education ==
=== Thai schools ===
There are about 10 Thai governmental schools for children on Koh Phangan. The education is free, but the learners are required to speak and write in Thai Language.

=== International and English-Medium schools ===
There are some private educational institutions following the national curriculum of England.

=== Nurseries ===
The Learning Tree Nursery & Kindergarten was opened in 2008 for children 2 to 7 years old. Currently closed.

Seeds of Phangan Kindergarten ages 2-5.

Tiny House daycare for babies from 8 months.

Babelikoh nursery was opened in 2022 for toddlers from 1 to 3 years old.

=== Primary ===
Si Ri Panya International School opened in 2012 provides education for children 5 to 11 years old (Key stages 1 & 3).

=== Secondary ===
Si Ri Panya International School provides education for children ages 11–16 (Key stage 3) following the English National Curriculum and the Cambridge Curriculum.

=== Tutorial & vocational ===
Wisdom College Tutorial and Vocational School, founded in 2018, International GED ® Authorized Provider, offers education for students aged 6 to 18, leading to an internationally recognized certification accepted by most of the universities, as well as IELTS tutoring, in partnership with IDP IELTS.

== Gallery ==
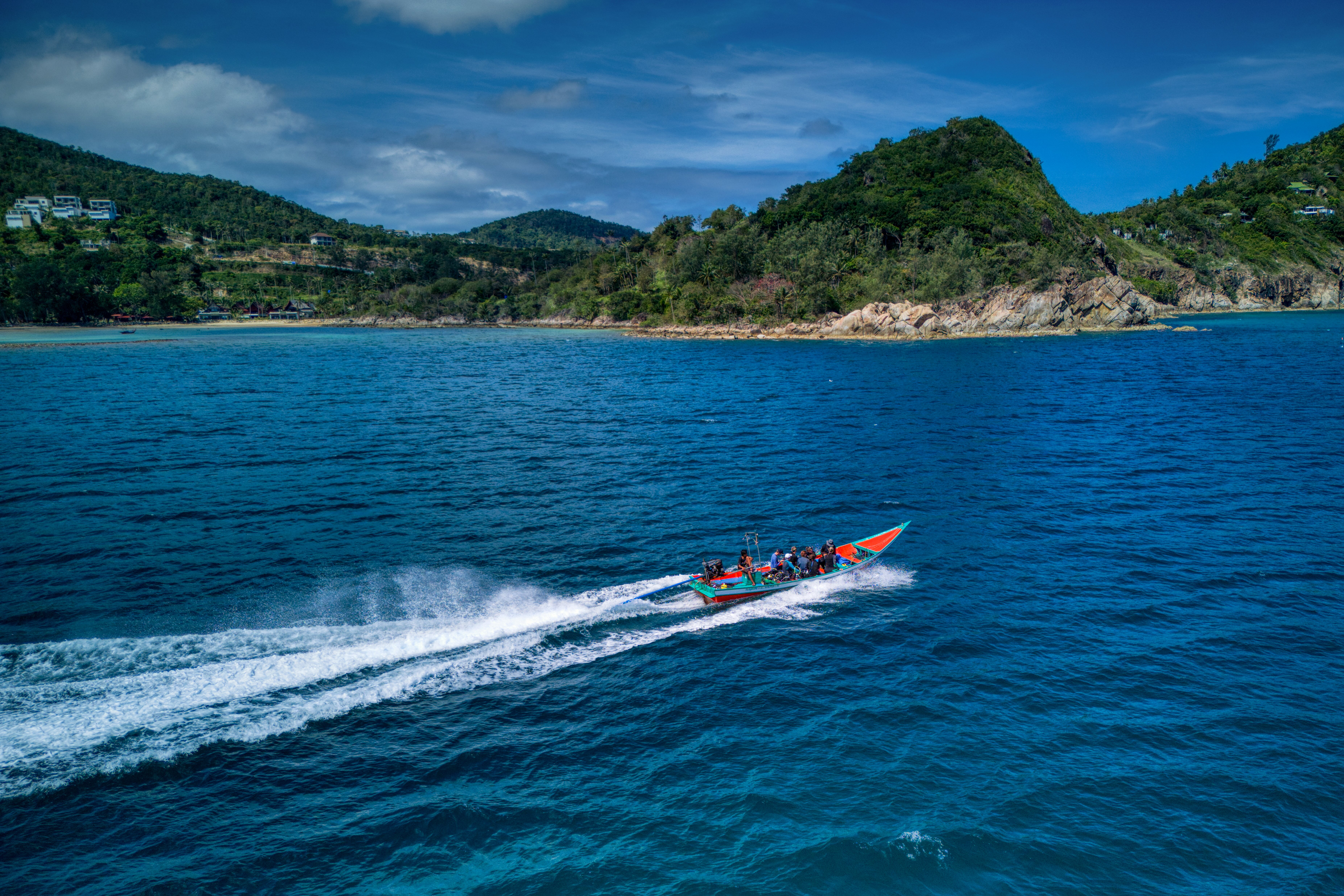

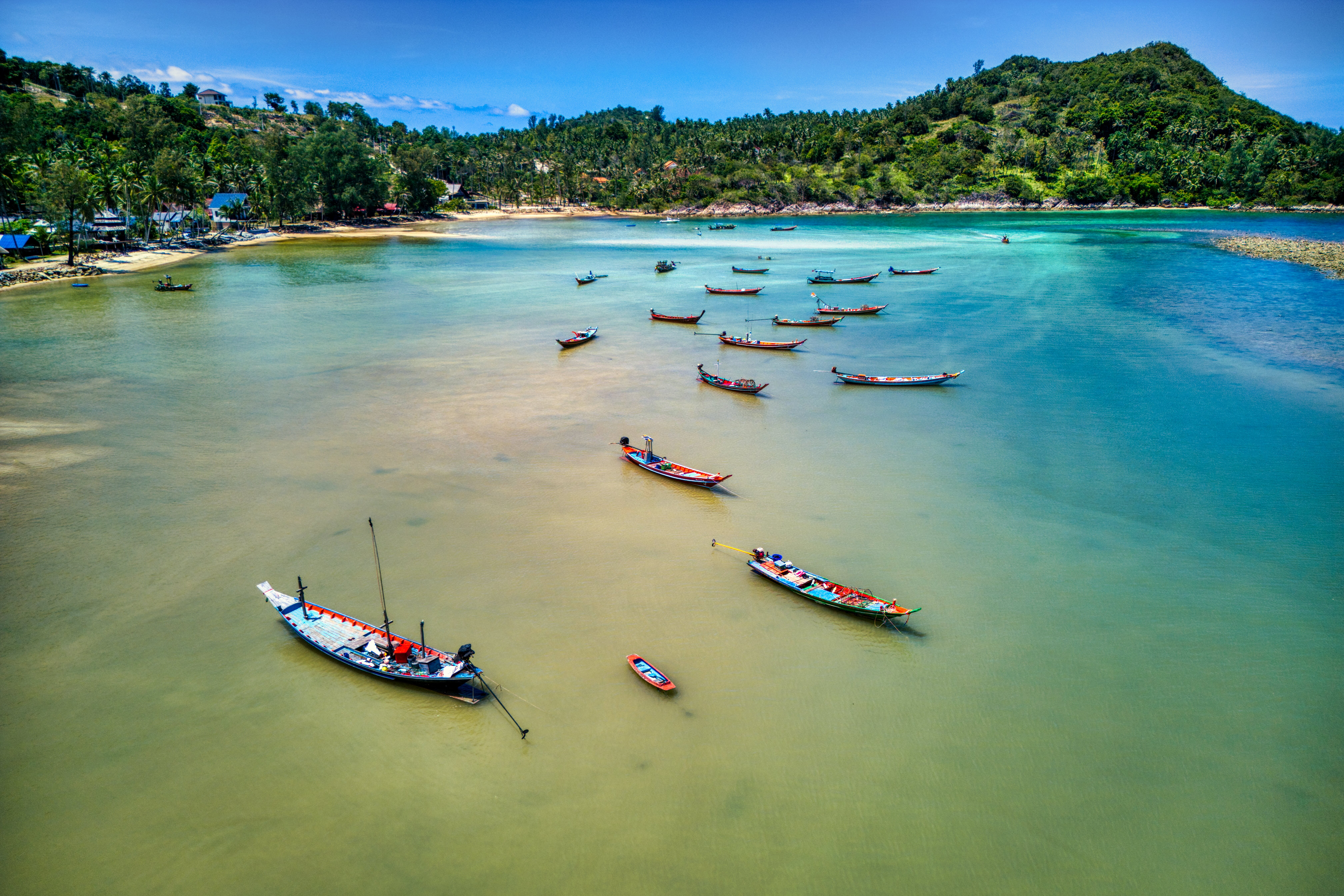

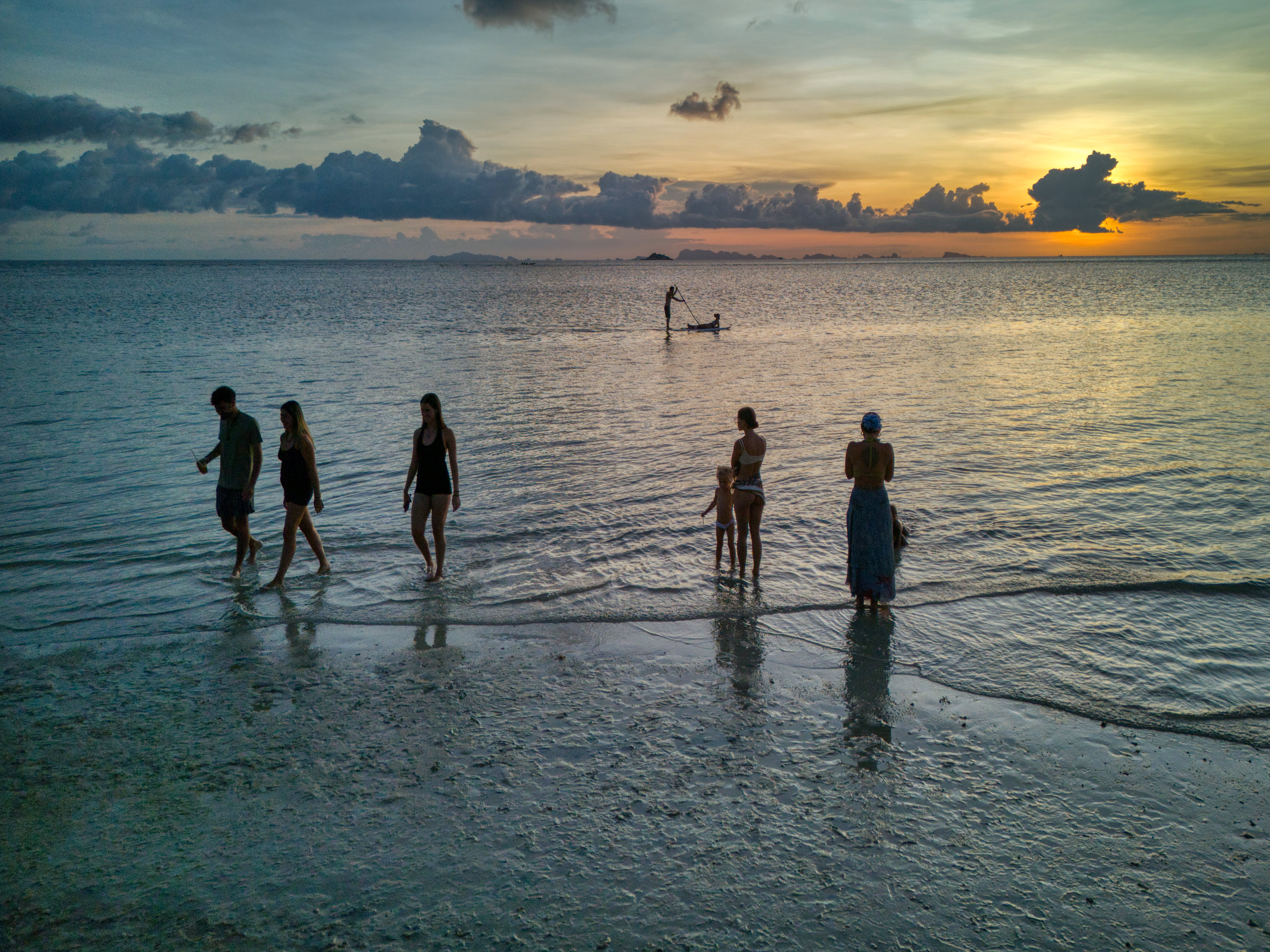

== See also ==
- List of islands of Thailand
- Banana Pancake Trail
- Half Moon Festival
