= Pai, Thailand =

Pai
- Town
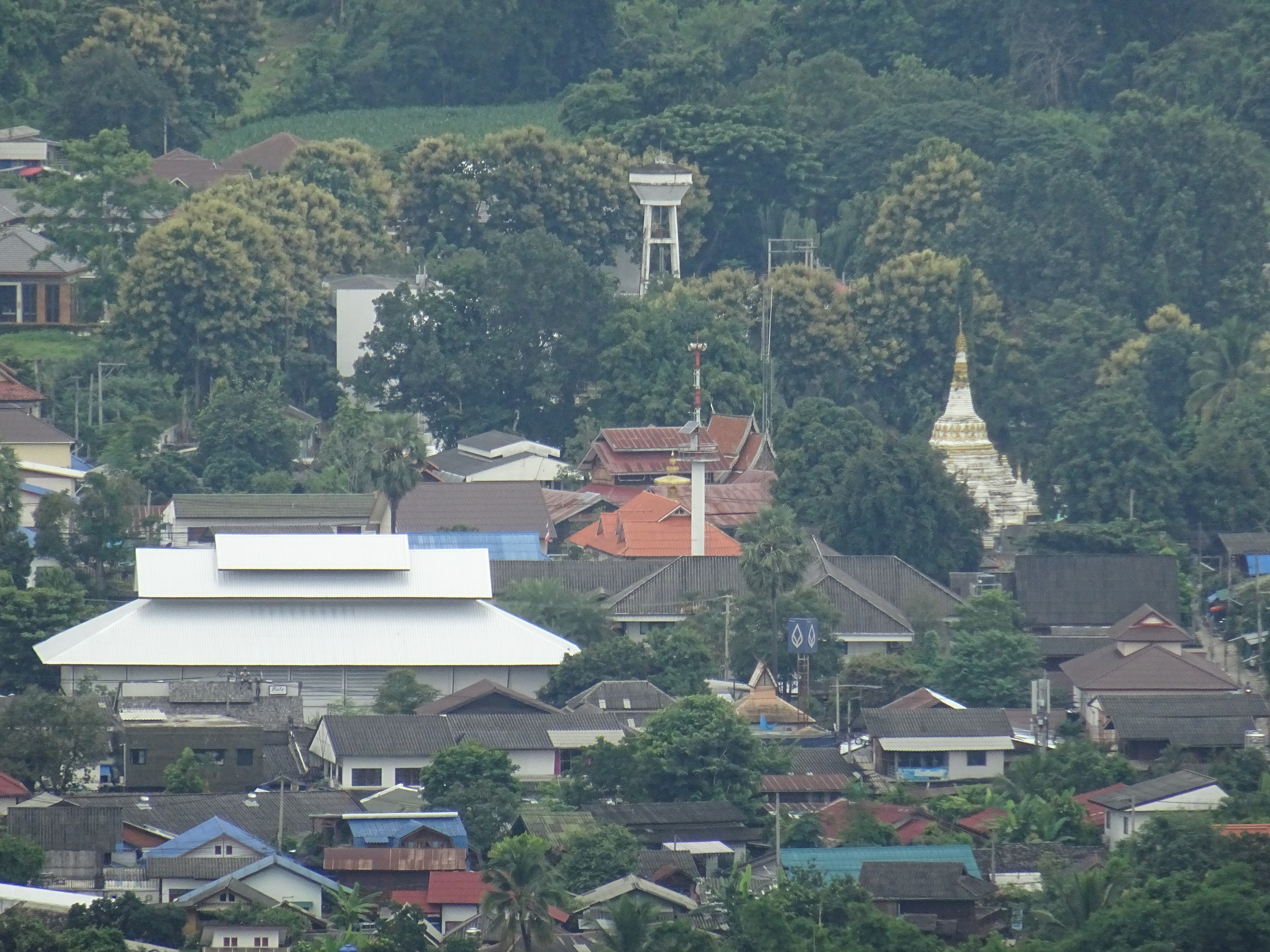
- Pai, 2018

- Location within Thailand
- Coordinates: 19°21′32″N 98°26′12″E
- Country: Thailand
- Province: Mae Hong Son
- District: Amphoe Pai

Population (2006)
  - Total: 2,284
- Time zone: UTC+7 (ICT)

Pai (Thai: ปาย, Burmese: ပါယ်) is a small town in northern Thailand's Mae Hong Son Province, near the Myanmar border, about 146 km (91 mi) northwest of Chiang Mai, on the northern route to Mae Hong Son. It lies on the Pai River. The town has thesaban tambon status and covers parts of the tambon Wiang Tai of Pai District. As of 2006, it had a population of 2,284.

== Etymology ==
Sources give several proposed origins for the name "Pai". A local account links the name to a tradition in which the Pai River was named after male elephants (Northern Thai: j๊างปาย), with the town later taking the river's name. Other explanations reported in Thai-language sources include derivation from a Thai Yai/Shan term (rendered as ป้าย), and an association with a leader named Khun Saeng Pai (ขุนส่างปาย).

== History ==
The area of modern-day Pai has been inhabited for more than 5,000 years. About 2,000 years ago, the Lawa tribe was the dominant ethnic group over all of the area of today's northern Thailand, and a few of their descendants still live in villages only about 20 km away from Pai.

The recorded history of the area starts about 800 years ago, with the establishment of a settlement (today known as Ban Wiang Nuea) about 3 km north of modern-day Pai. Ban Wiang Nuea was founded in 1251 CE by Shan immigrants from the region of modern-day northern Myanmar. Due to the area's remoteness and seclusion, people in those times were mostly cut off from news of the outside world and therefore not much concerned with the politics of Lanna and the rest of Thailand. That changed drastically during the course of the 14th and 15th centuries, when the first settlers arrived from Chiang Mai. It was part of Lanna policy at the time to send citizens loyal to the throne to the outposts of the empire, in order to consolidate and affirm its territorial authority. The result was a conflict that eventually led to a series of wars over territorial dominance in the Pai area. Lanna troops finally defeated the Shan in 1481, forcing them to retire to Burmese territory. The Shan families who had lived in the area for a long time, establishing households, farming land, and raising families, were granted permission to stay by the Lanna prince, along with a certain degree of cultural and social autonomy under the law and authority of the Lanna kingdom. Ban Wiang Nuea as a result became a village strictly divided by a wall into a Shan part and a Lanna part.

In the second half of the 19th century, colonial powers France and England, who had already established their influence in Vietnam, Cambodia, Laos, and Burma, were viewing the area of modern-day Thailand with increasing interest. To consolidate Siam's influence and authority in the northern border region, the royal house encouraged northern Thais from provinces such as Phayao, Lamphun, and Nan to migrate to those areas. The result again was conflict: the last fight between Lanna and the Shan in Ban Wiang Nuea took place in 1869, when Lanna soldiers defeated their Shan opponents in a battle that ended with the total destruction of the village, which was burnt to the ground. All structures standing in Ban Vieng Nuea today are the result of the subsequent rebuilding efforts of the villagers.

There was already a road (that took up to a week to traverse) leading from Chiang Mai to Pai in the late 19th century. The settlement, then known as Ban Wiang Tai, developed into the modern town of Pai. Many new immigrants chose to settle in the area along the connecting network of trails to Mae Hong Son.

In 1943, Japan began several projects to create efficient troop and equipment transport routes between Thailand and Myanmar in support of their planned attacks on Imphal and Kohima. In addition to the so-called Death Railway through Kanchanaburi, this included improvement of the existing road from Chiang Mai to Pai as well as the patchwork of trails leading north to Mae Hong Son. A bridge spanning the Pai River about 10 km southeast of the city was built after the war and erroneously named the "World War II Memorial Bridge". It was apparently erected (and subsequently twice extended) in the course of road improvement projects by the Thai government. The Japanese efforts to develop road networks were abandoned in early 1944, when it became evident that the improvements could not be completed in time for the scheduled attack on Imphal. The incomplete road did serve as an avenue of retreat for the Japanese after their disastrous defeat at Imphal and Kohima, however.

In 1967, the Thai government started developing the road leading from Chiang Mai via Pai to Mae Hong Son, known today as Route 1095, but didn't finish paving it until the early- to mid-1990s.

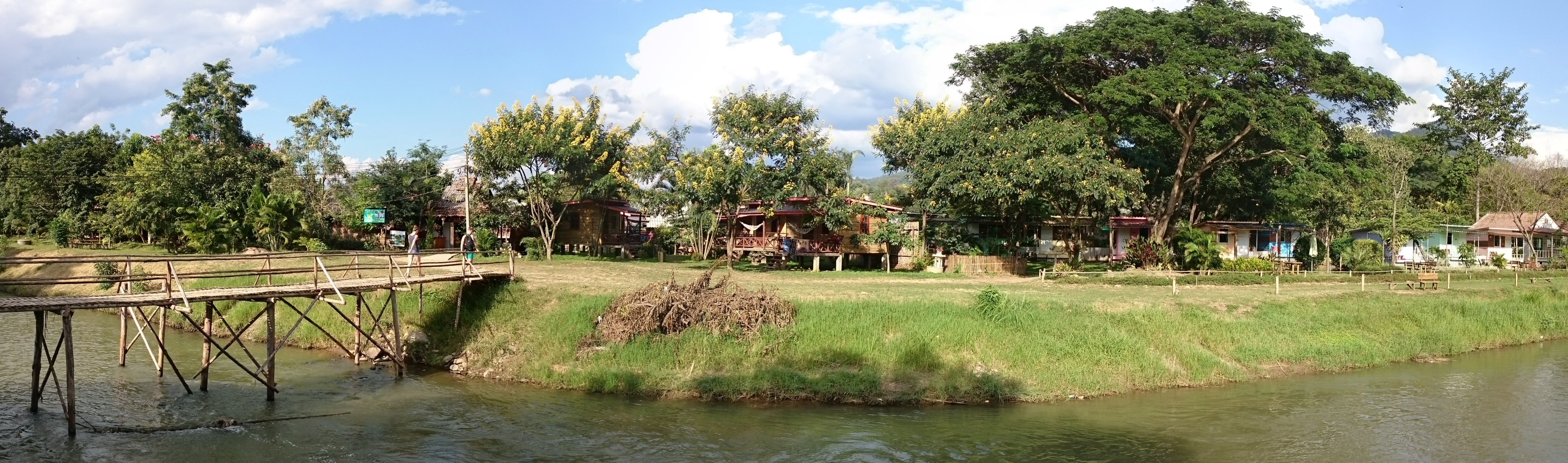
Bamboo bridge over the Pai River

In addition to the waves of old Shan and Lanna immigrants, Karen migrants arrived in the 18th century, Lisu and Lahu people from areas of southern China came in the early 20th, Muslim families from Chiang Mai began arriving to establish trading businesses starting around 1950, a group of Kuomintang soldiers fleeing China in the wake of their defeat in the Chinese Civil War established a community in Pai in the early 1960s, and finally, a new wave of refugees from the Shan State of Burma have migrated to the area in the past few decades, fleeing the turmoil in Myanmar to work as laborers in Thailand.

Pai suffered a huge mudslide and severe flooding in 2005, resulting in major structural damage to homes, resorts, storefronts, and bridges.

== Access ==
Pai is on Route 1095, which connects Mae Hong Son with Chiang Mai. Pai Airport, built in 1947, was paved in 2007. Between 2007 and 2014, Siam General Aviation served the airport daily to and from Chiang Mai International Airport. Later, until 2017, Kan Air operated the same route using a Cessna 208. Both airlines have since gone out of business, and there have been no commercial flights to or from Pai since.

== Tourism and development ==
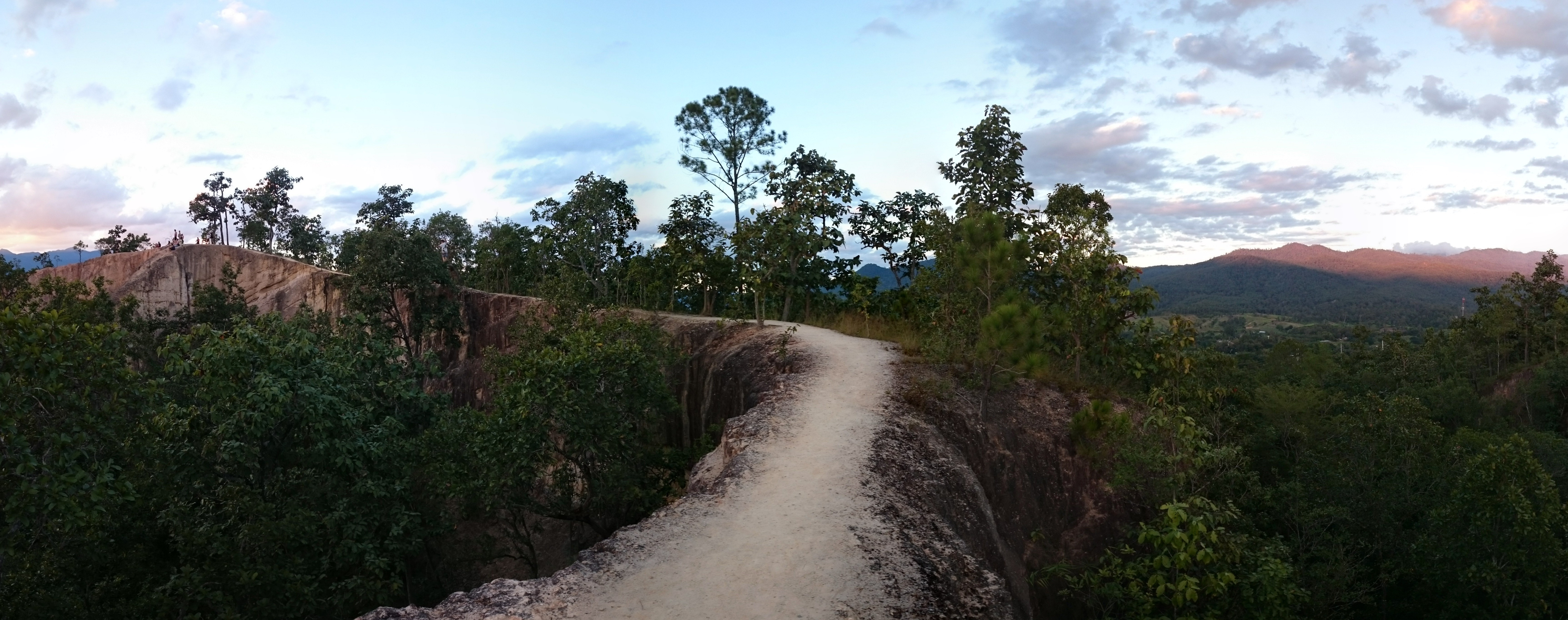
Pai Canyon

Pai was once a quiet market village inhabited by Shan people whose culture is influenced by Myanmar. As of 2026, Pai primarily thrives on tourism. Known among backpackers for its relaxed atmosphere, the town is full of cheap guesthouses, souvenir shops, and restaurants. Its surroundings include so-called "elephant camps", waterfalls, hot springs, and hiking trails. As Pai lies in a valley, some tourists use it as a base for trekking and visiting hill tribes like Karen, Hmong, Lisu, and Lahu.

Pai has several 7-Elevens, a number of small- to medium-sized luxury resorts, live music clubs, and beer bars. While some locals hail this tourism boom as a new age of prosperity for Pai, others point to the loss of the town's traditional customs and culture.

During the tourist high season of November through March, tourist numbers swell to the point that Pai experiences traffic jams as well as shortages of electricity, water, and gasoline.

== Controversies ==
=== Police conduct ===
Pai has faced controversy concerning the conduct of local as well as drug enforcement police. Some examples include:

- In 2001, Pai police arrested and jailed the owner of Bebop Bar, with the explanation that he was "letting people dance in a place of business not officially licensed as a disco".
- Also in 2001 and again in 2003, Pai district officials and police began enforcing several illegal measures ostensibly aimed at increasing safety for tourists, specifically, "a 'recommendation' via illegal denial of permits whereby all guesthouses must have walls made from a solid material, such as wood, drywall, compressed fibre or cement" rather than the cheaper and more traditional bamboo favored by many guesthouse owners and backpackers.
- The "War on Drugs" launched in February 2003 by former prime minister Thaksin Shinawatra, in which "more than 2,000 people were killed as the government effectively declared 'open season' on those accused of involvement in the drug trade", took a heavy toll on Pai district and downtown Pai in particular.
- In 2006, Pai police purchased a new mobile drug testing vehicle, and there have been numerous reported instances of the police entering bars and other establishments and randomly urine-testing foreign tourists. In many of these cases, it has been apparent that the searches were not performed legally. In Thailand, "when requesting urinalysis for drug identification purposes, at least one member of the Narcotics Suppression Police must be present. Regular Thai police do not have this right, nor do the Tourist Police. Second of all, there must be probable cause."
- On 5 January 2008, an off-duty police officer, Sgt. Uthai Dechawiwat, shot Canadian tourists Leo John Del Pinto and Carly Reisig. Del Pinto was hit fatally in the face and stomach, Reisig was shot in the chest, and Dechawiwat immediately fled the scene. The sergeant claimed he was intervening in an argument between the couple when Del Pinto attacked him, something the latter's family denies he would have done. While out on bail for the shooting, Dechawiwat also murdered his 18-year old pregnant wife by beating her with a piece of wood. Dechawiwat eventually pled guilty to both murders and was sentenced to a total of 62 years in prison.

=== Sustainable tourism ===
In 2025, there were several incidents between locals and tourists, highlighting challenges in sustainable tourism and cultural differences, as the latter represented around 15% of the town's population in 2024, with the largest proportion consisting of Israeli nationals. Following some of these incidents, a few local shops resorted to putting up "No Israel Here" signs. The Israeli ambassador to Thailand visited Pai in February in order to calm tensions.

In March 2026, it was reported that over 4,000 Israelis were residing in a Chabad house in Pai.

== Gallery ==
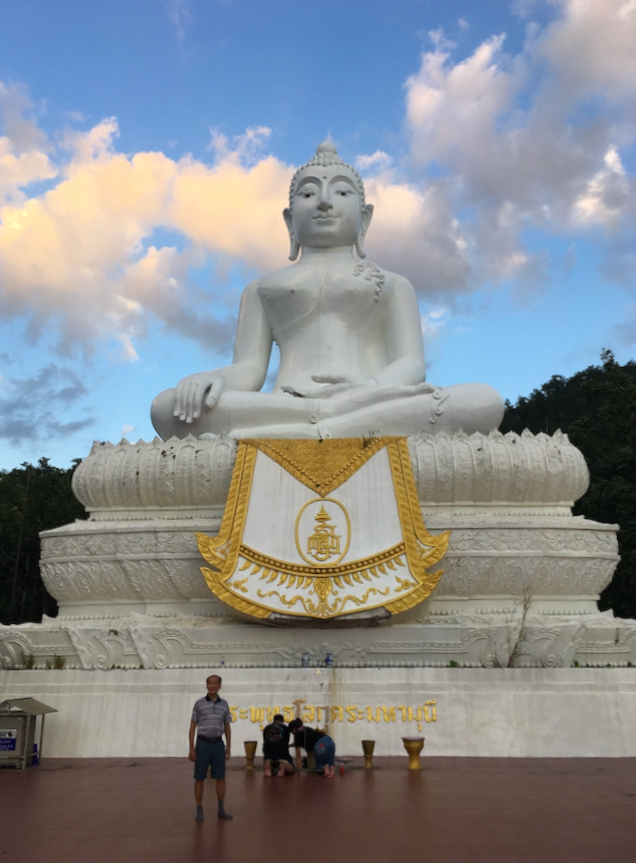
Big Buddha Pai

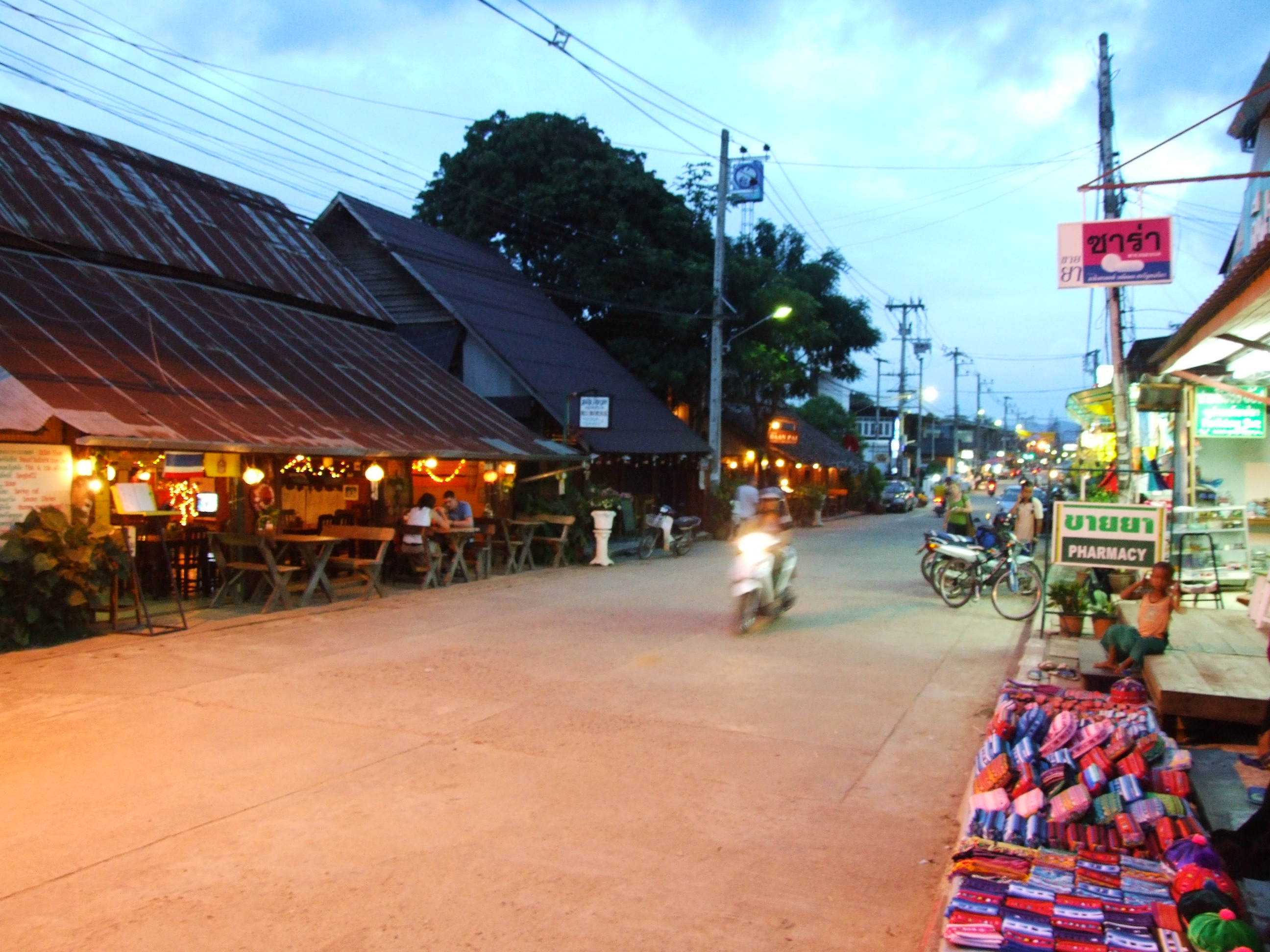
A street in Pai

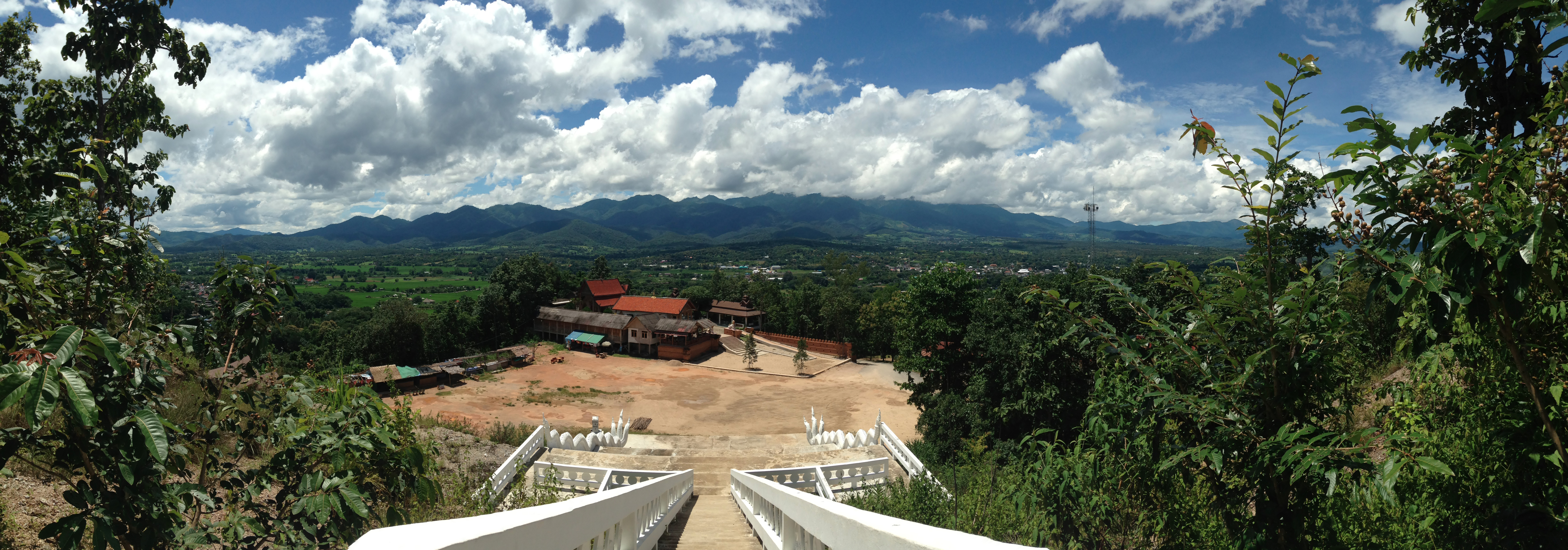
View of southern Pai from the steps of the Big Buddha

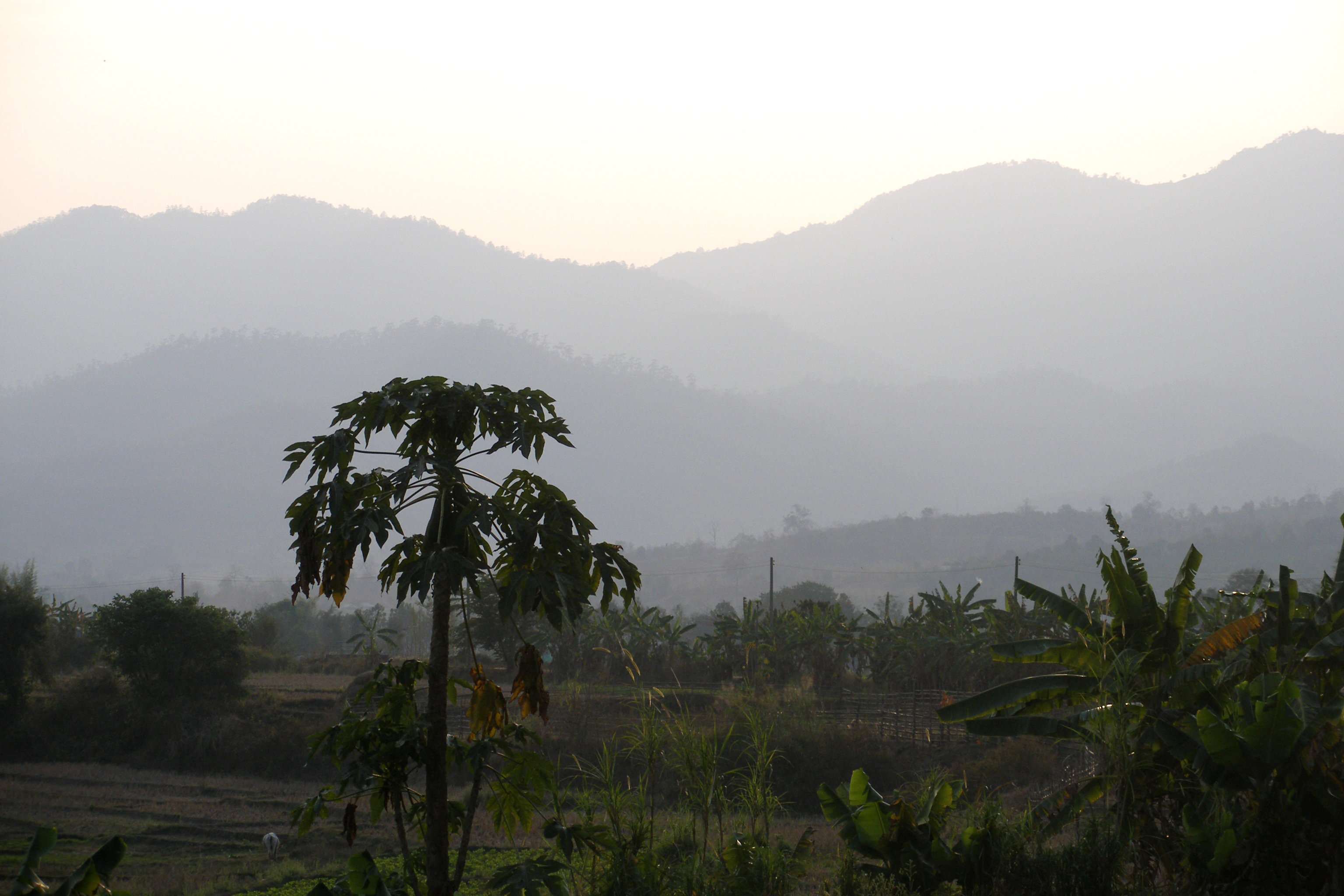
Pai countryside

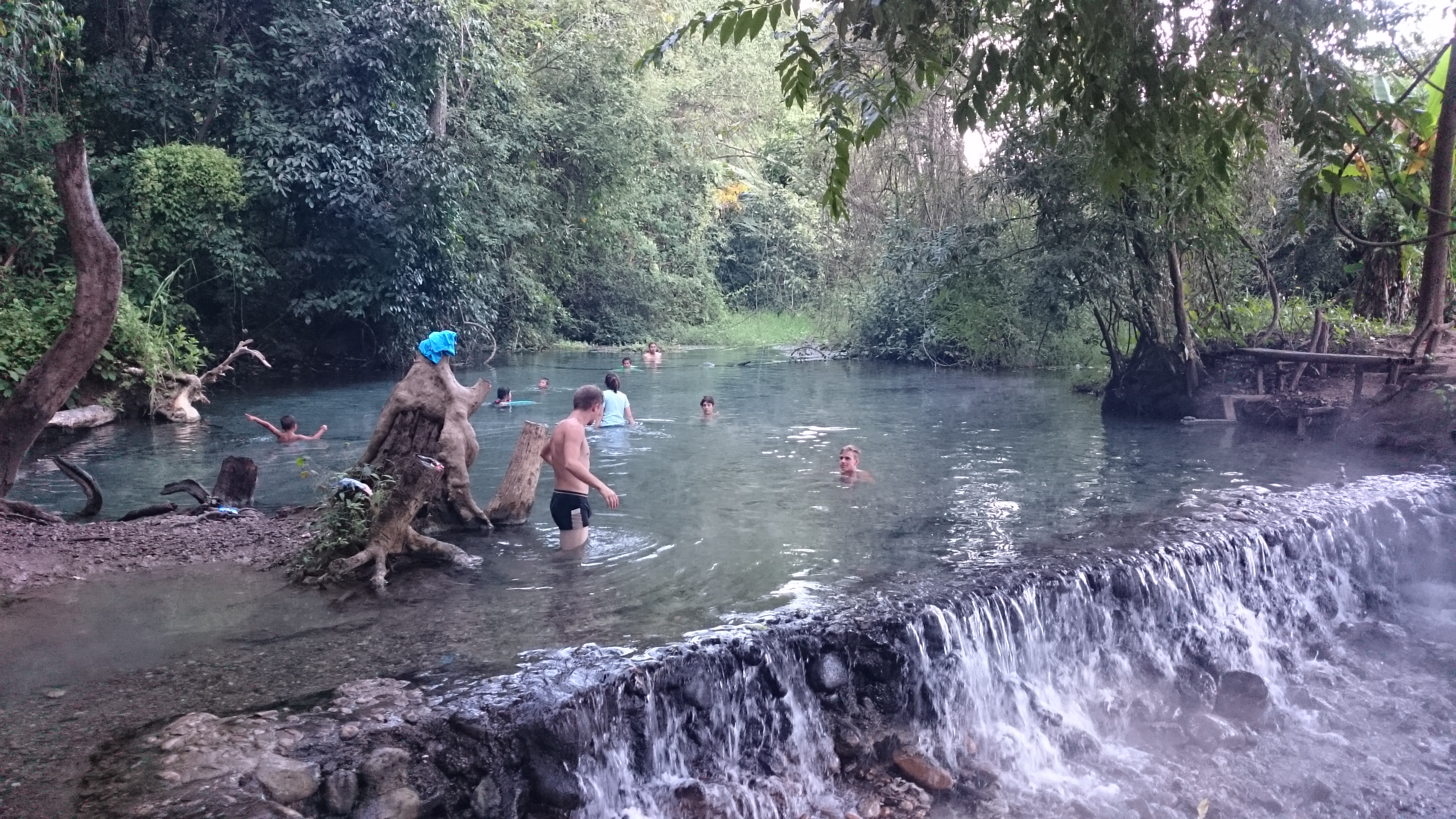
Sai Ngam hot springs, near Pai

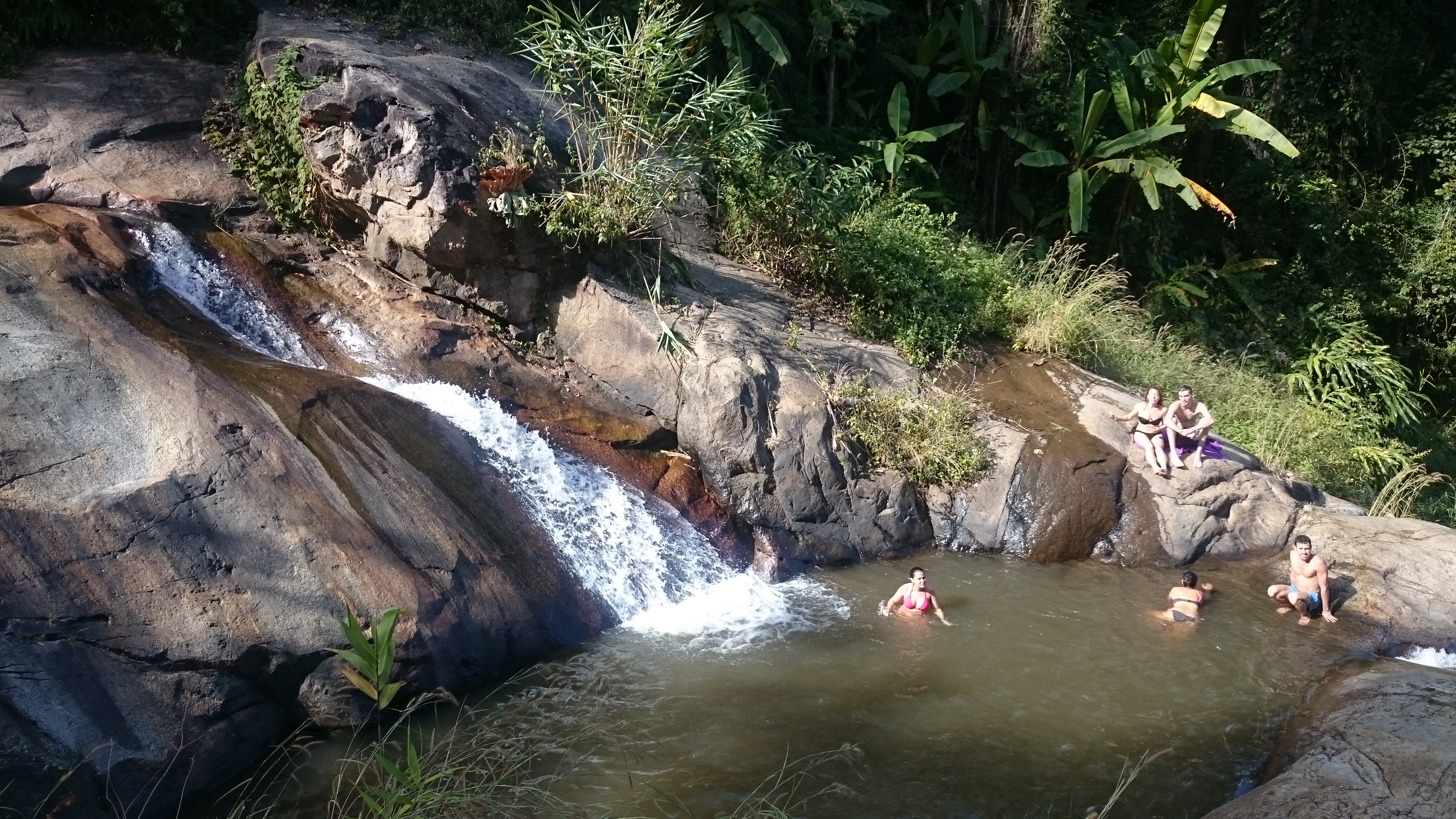
Mo Paeng waterfall, near Pai

== See also ==
- Banana Pancake Trail
- Tourism in Thailand
