= Half Moon Festival =

Halfmoon Festival Party
- Genre: Electronic music, etc.
- Dates: Two weeks before and after the Full Moon
- Locations: Ko Pha Ngan, Thailand
- Years active: 2002-Present
- Founders: Jao Entertainment Group
- Attendance: 2000-4000
- Website: https://www.halfmoonfestival.com/

The Halfmoon Festival is a monthly two-day electronic music festival on Koh Phangan, Thailand.

The Halfmoon Festival was founded in 2002 by DJs Jao Pattanasiri and Oren Mizrachi and features DJs and live acts encompassing techno, psytrance, R&B, hip-hop, and reggae styles.

== See also ==
- List of electronic music festivals
