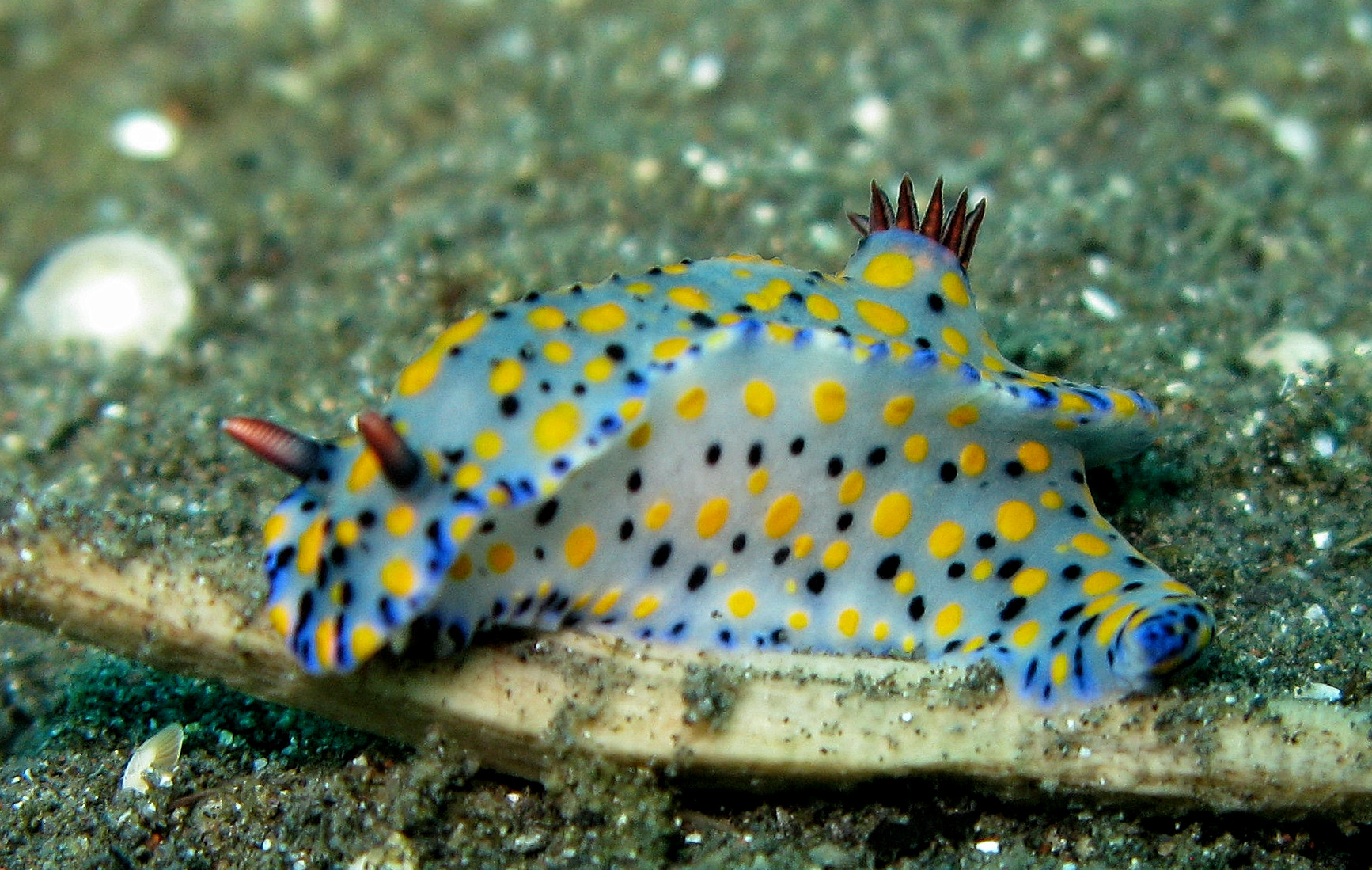

Scientific classification
- Kingdom: Animalia
- Phylum: Mollusca
- Class: Gastropoda
- Order: Nudibranchia
- Family: Chromodorididae
- Genus: Hypselodoris
- Species: H. kanga

Binomial name
- Hypselodoris kanga Rudman, 1977

= Hypselodoris kanga =

Species of gastropod

Hypselodoris kanga is a species of sea slug or dorid nudibranch, a marine gastropod mollusk in the family Chromodorididae.

== Distribution ==
This nudibranch was described from Kunduchi, Dar es Salaam, Tanzania. It was previously reported throughout the Indian Ocean and West Pacific Ocean. Specimens from the Pacific Ocean are now thought to be other species, including Hypselodoris confetti and Hypselodoris roo. It has been recorded from Mozambique.

== Description ==
Hypselodoris kanga has a blue-grey body covered in black and yellow spots. There are black spots bordered by blue at the mantle edge. The rhinophores are red and the rhinophore stalks deep blue. The gills are triangular in cross section and the gill pinnules are white. The inner edge of each gill is reddish orange in the upper quarter, deep blue in the mid region and white in the basal quarter. The smooth outer side of each gill is orange-red in the upper quarter and the rest has a background colour of light blue with a row of large yellow spots. The two outer corners of each gill are bordered with red at the tip becoming dark blue at the base. This species can reach a total length of at least 70 mm (2.8 in) and has been observed feeding on sponges from the genus Dysidea.

== Gallery ==
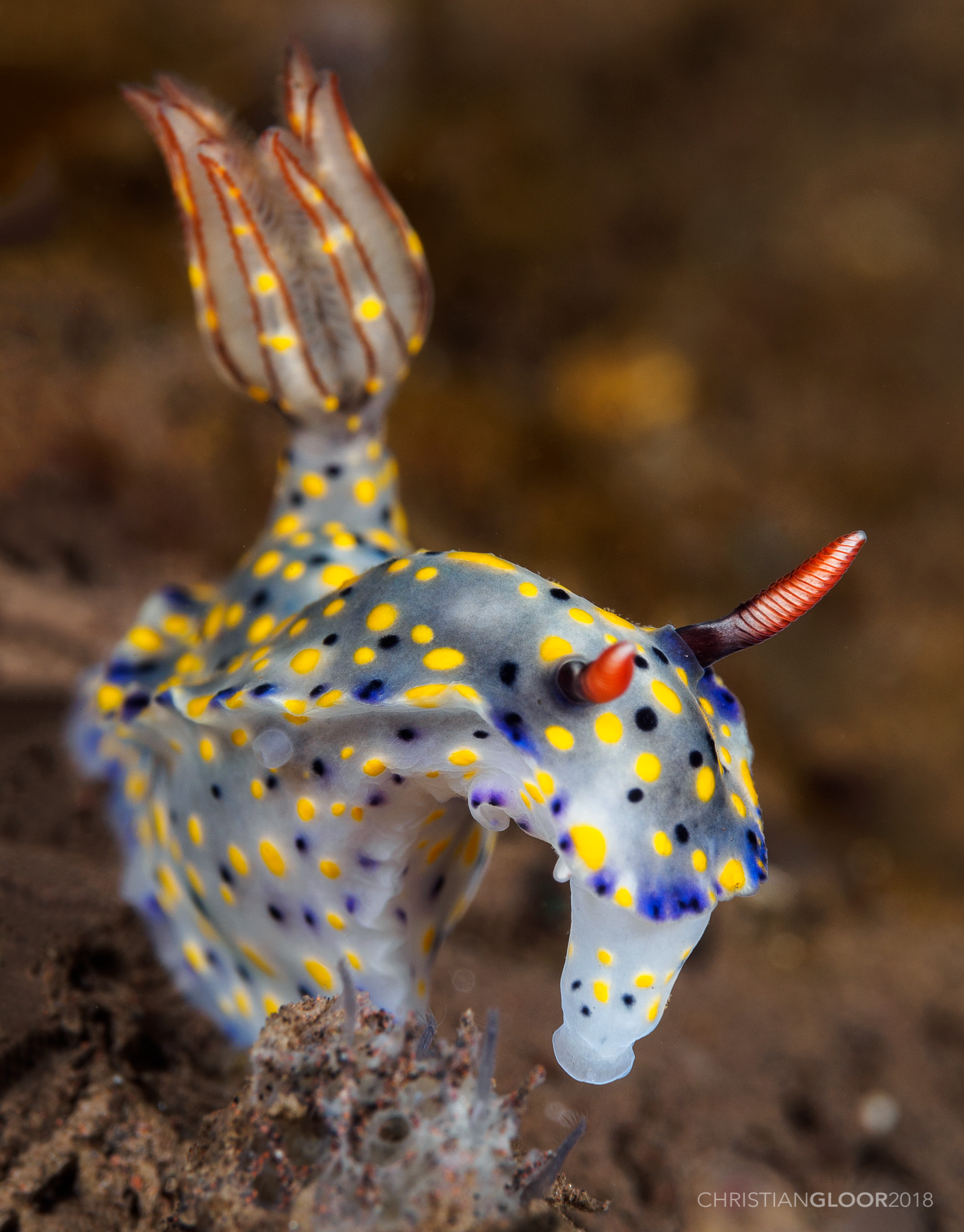
Hypselodoris kanga at Wakatobi National Park, 2018

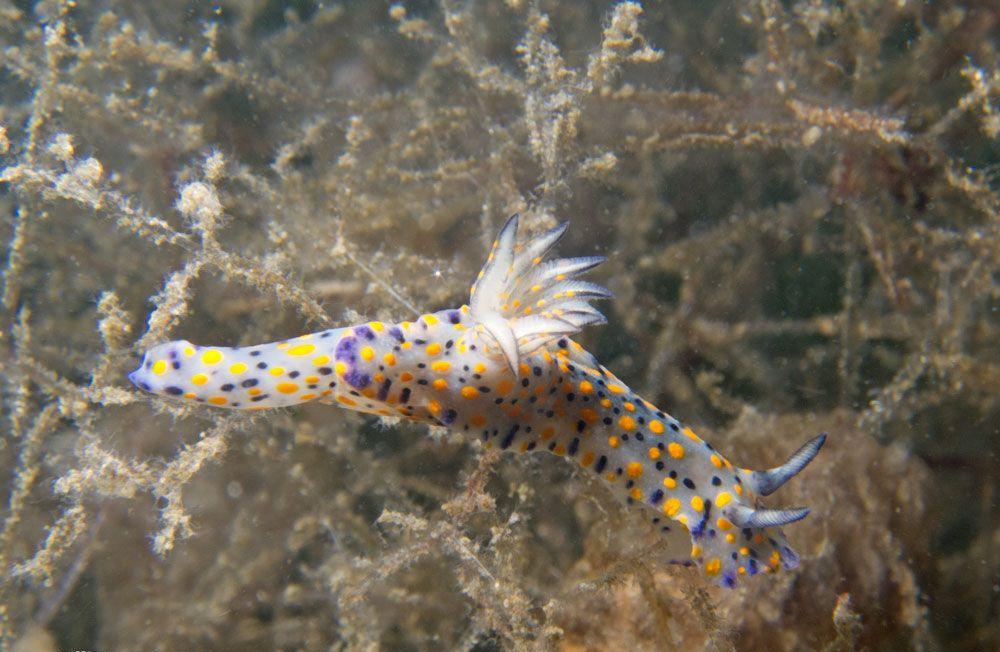
Hypselodoris kanga at Koh Phangan, Thailand, 2014

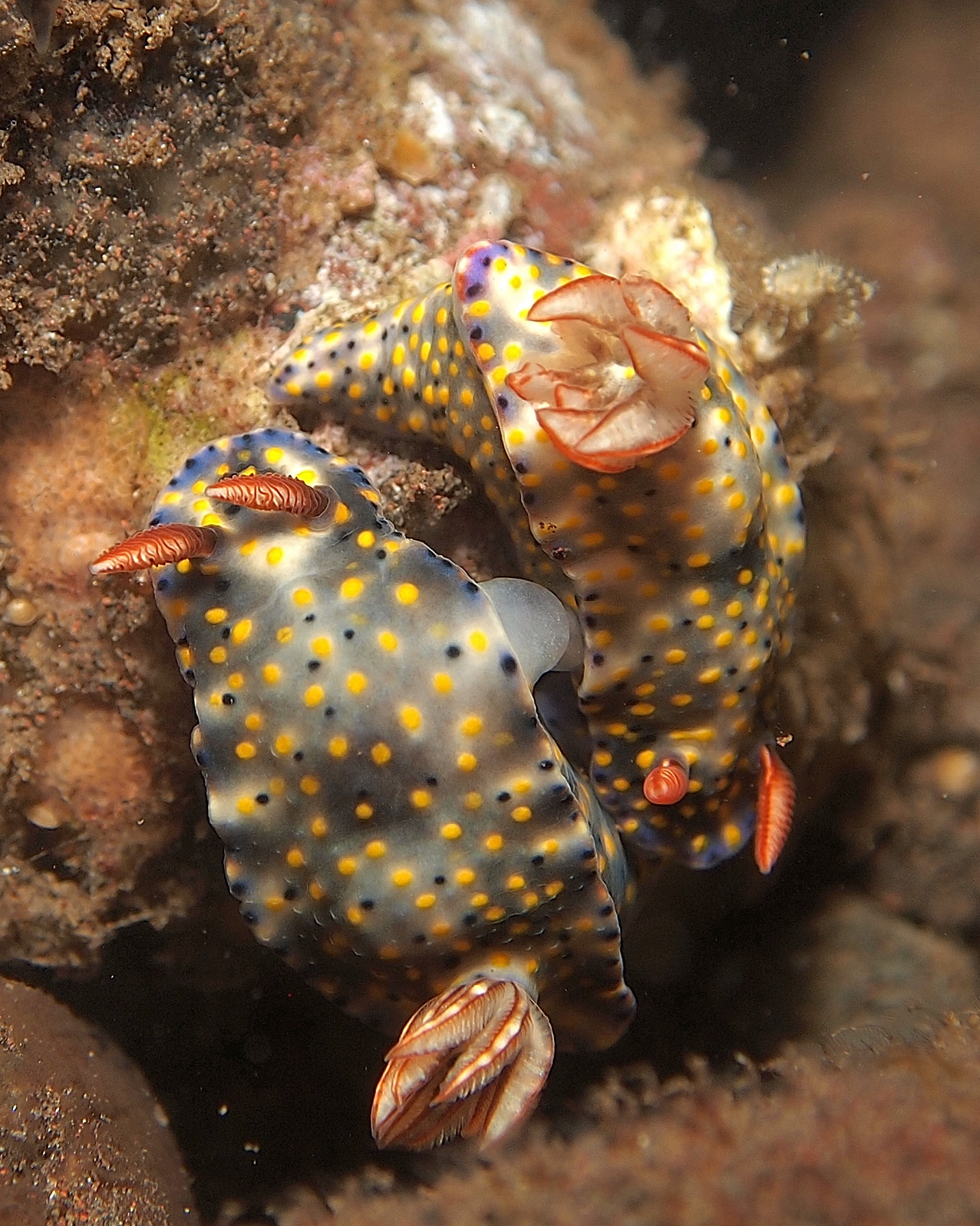
Hypselodoris kanga Mating

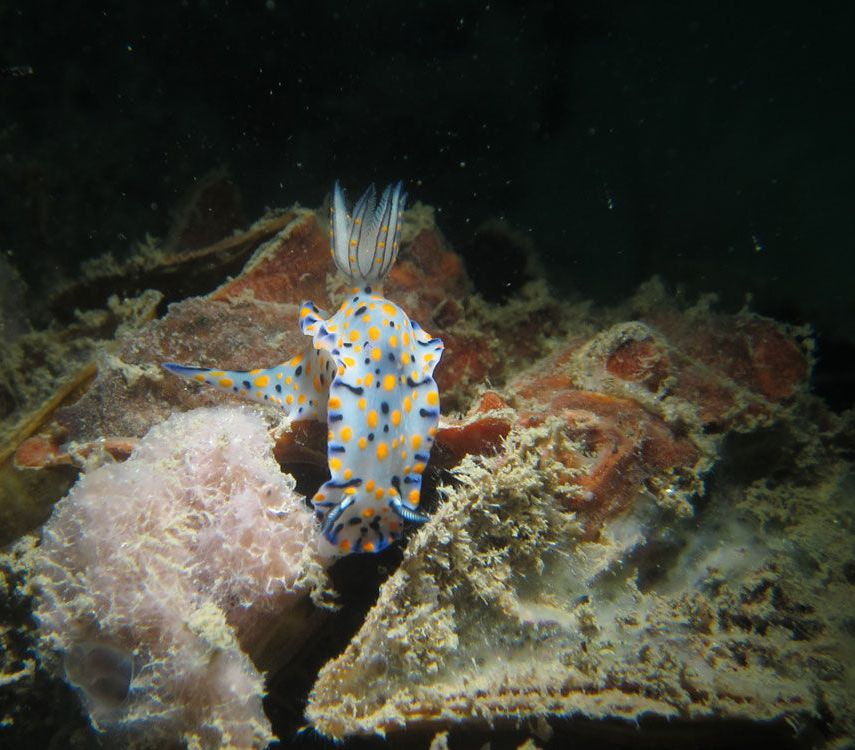
Hypselodoris kanga at Koh Phangan, Thailand, 2014

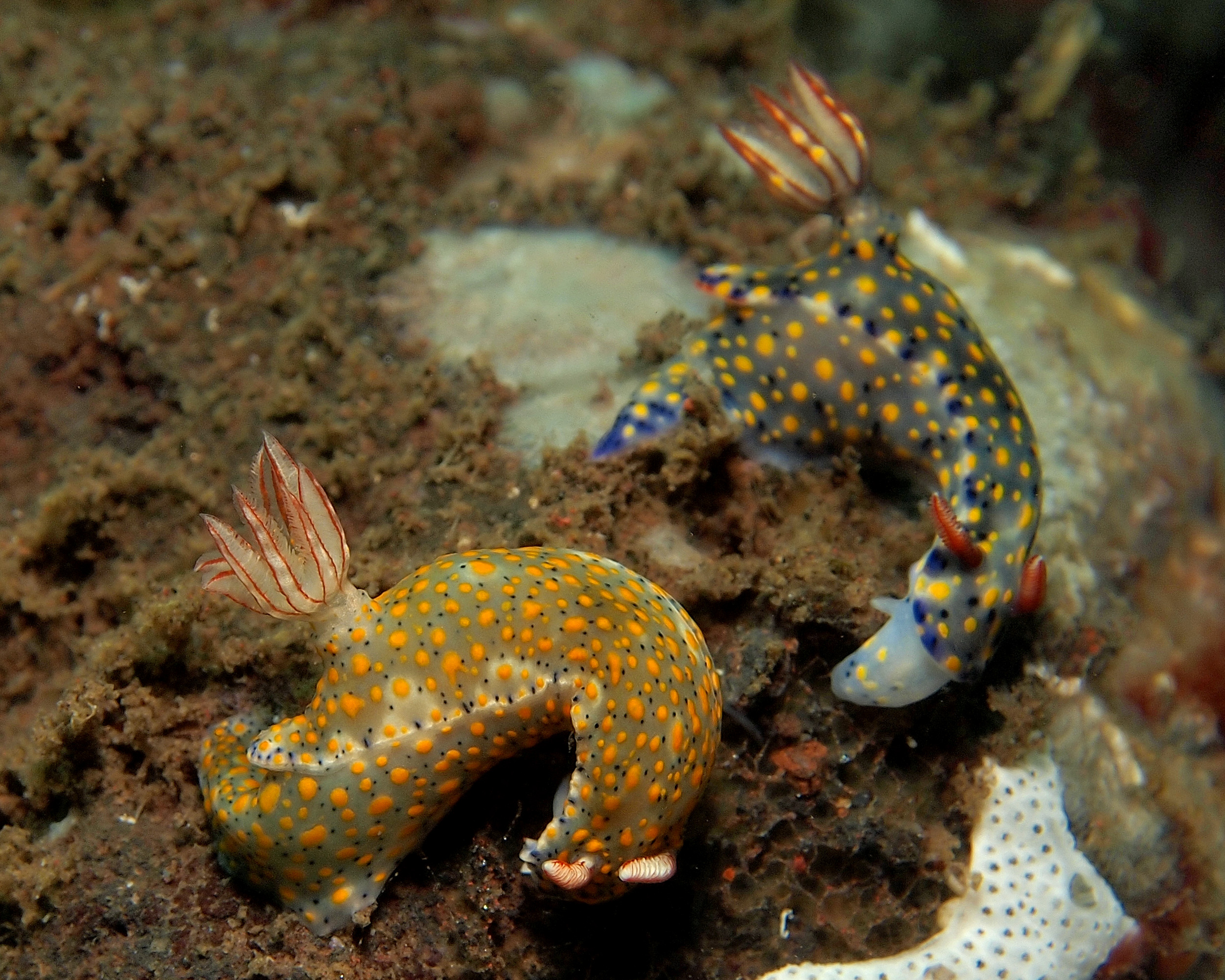
Hypselodoris kanga at Tulamben, Bali, 2011

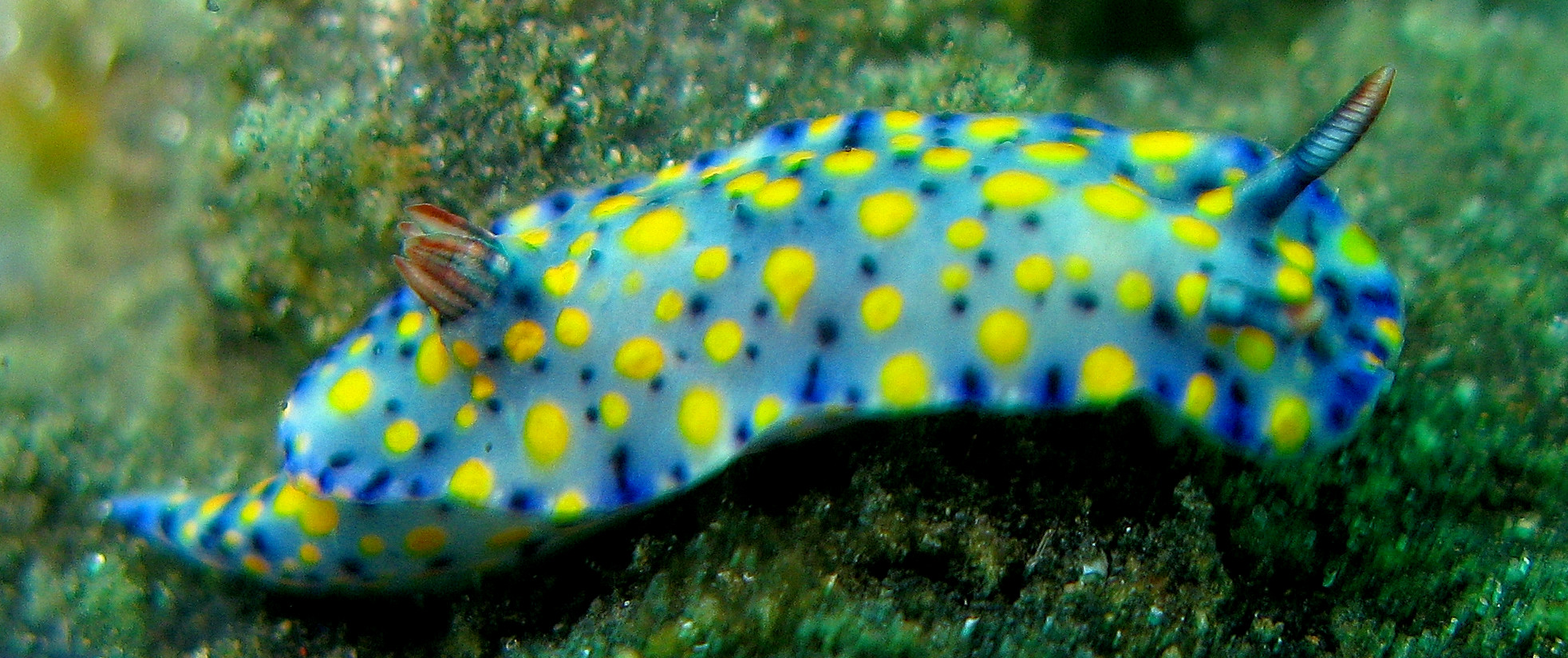
Close up of Hypselodoris kanga
