= Pai district =

Pai ปาย
- District
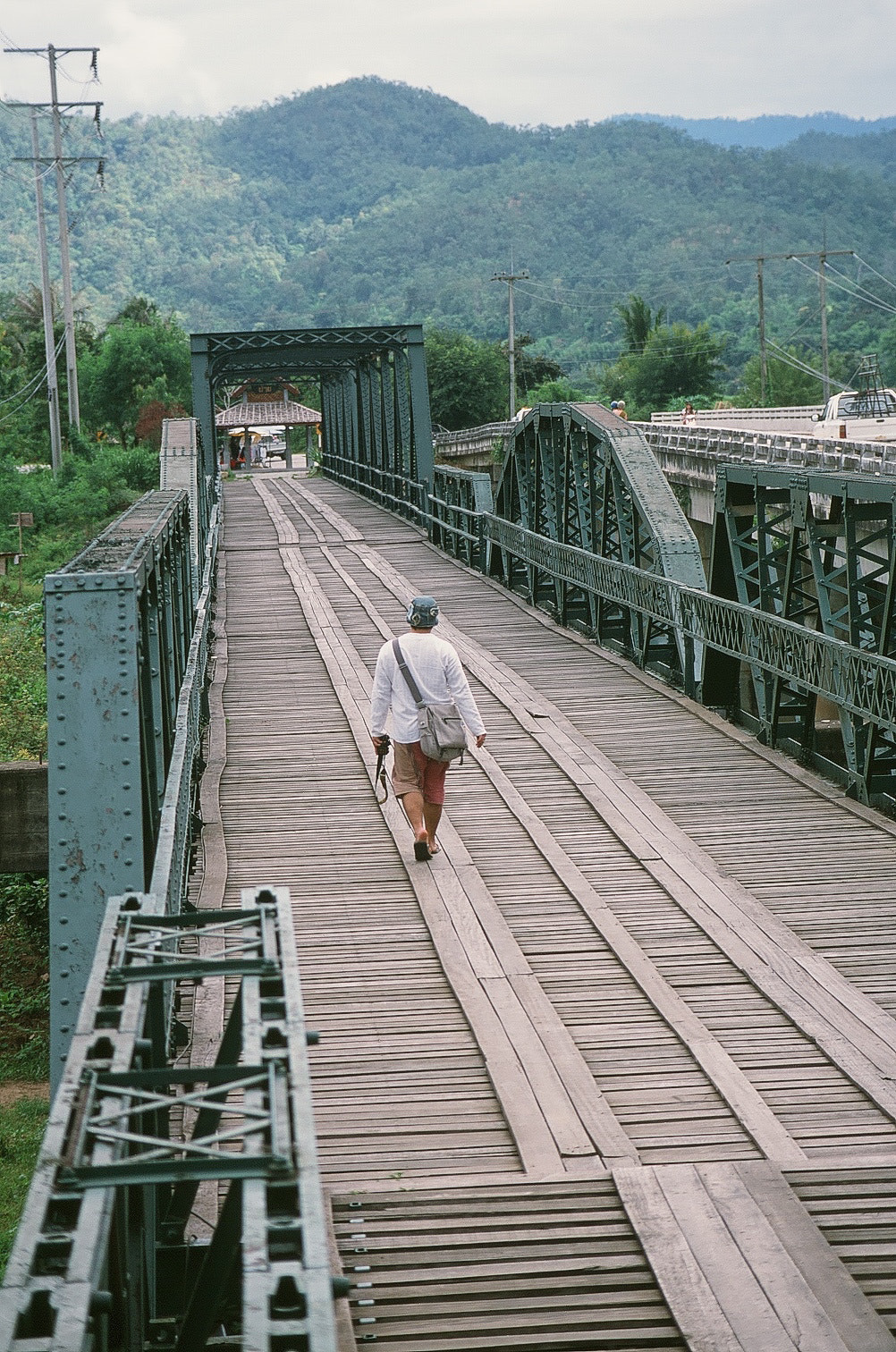
- Tha Pai Memorial Bridge in 2009

- District location in Mae Hong Son province
- Coordinates: 19°21′31″N 98°26′24″E
- Country: Thailand
- Province: Mae Hong Son

Area
  - Total: 2,244.7 km^{2} (866.7 sq mi)

Population (2005)
  - Total: 29,526
  - Density: 13.2/km^{2} (34/sq mi)
- Time zone: UTC+7 (ICT)
- Postal code: 58130
- Geocode: 5803

Pai (Thai: ปาย, pronounced [pāːj]; Northern Thai: ᨻᩣ᩠ᨿ, pronounced [pāːj]) is the northeasternmost district (amphoe) of Mae Hong Son province, northern Thailand. The central town is Pai.

== Geography ==
The Daen Lao Range dominates the landscape of this district. Neighboring districts are (clockwise from west): Mueang Mae Hong Son, Pang Mapha of Mae Hong Son Province; Shan State of Myanmar; Wiang Haeng, Chiang Dao, Mae Taeng, Samoeng, and Galyani Vadhana of Chiang Mai province.

The main rivers in the district are the Pai and Khong Rivers.

== History ==
"Pai" in Lanna script

In 1477, during the reign of King Tilokaraj of the Lanna Kingdom, he ordered Prince Si Chai to attack the Burmese army at Ban Don. During the battle, two of the king's white elephants escaped. Soldiers were sent to search for them and eventually found the animals swimming in an unnamed river. The king then named the river Pai, derived from the word Phlai (meaning a male elephant), which was also the name of one of the elephants, Chang Pai.

After the victory, the king granted Prince Si Chai the title Lord Chai Songkhram and placed him in charge of Pai.

== Administration ==
The district is divided into seven sub-districts (tambons), which are further subdivided into 66 villages (mubans). Pai itself has township (thesaban tambon) status and covers parts of tambon Wiang Tai. There are a further seven tambon administrative organizations (TAO).

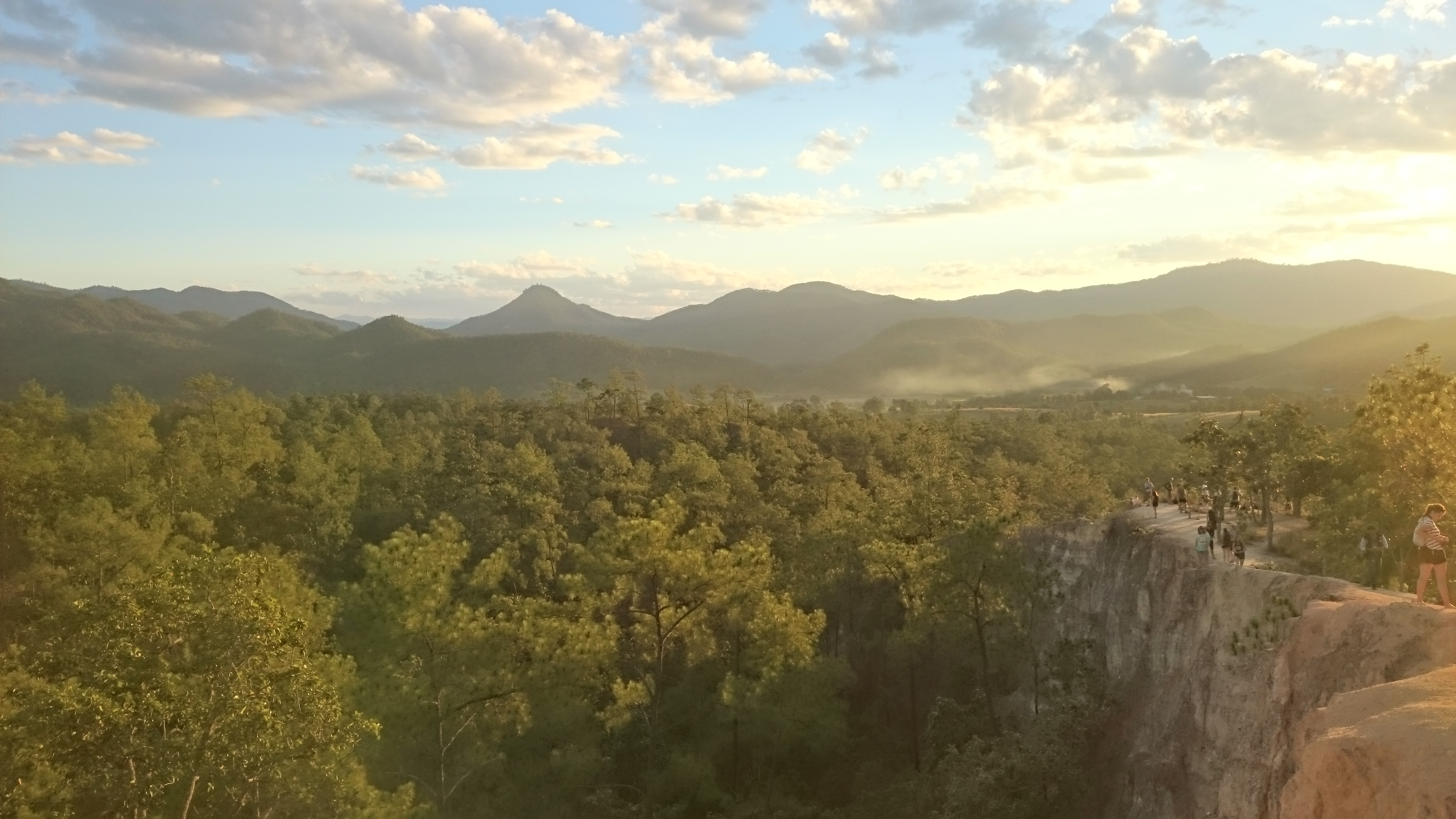
Pai canyon

No.	Name	Thai name	Villages	Pop.
1.	Wiang Tai	เวียงใต้	8	6,493
2.	Wiang Nuea	เวียงเหนือ	10	3,727
3.	Mae Na Toeng	แม่นาเติง	14	6,417
4.	Mae Hi	แม่ฮี้	6	2,835
5.	Thung Yao	ทุ่งยาว	12	3,990
6.	Mueang Paeng	เมืองแปง	9	3,198
7.	Pong Sa	โป่งสา	7	2,866

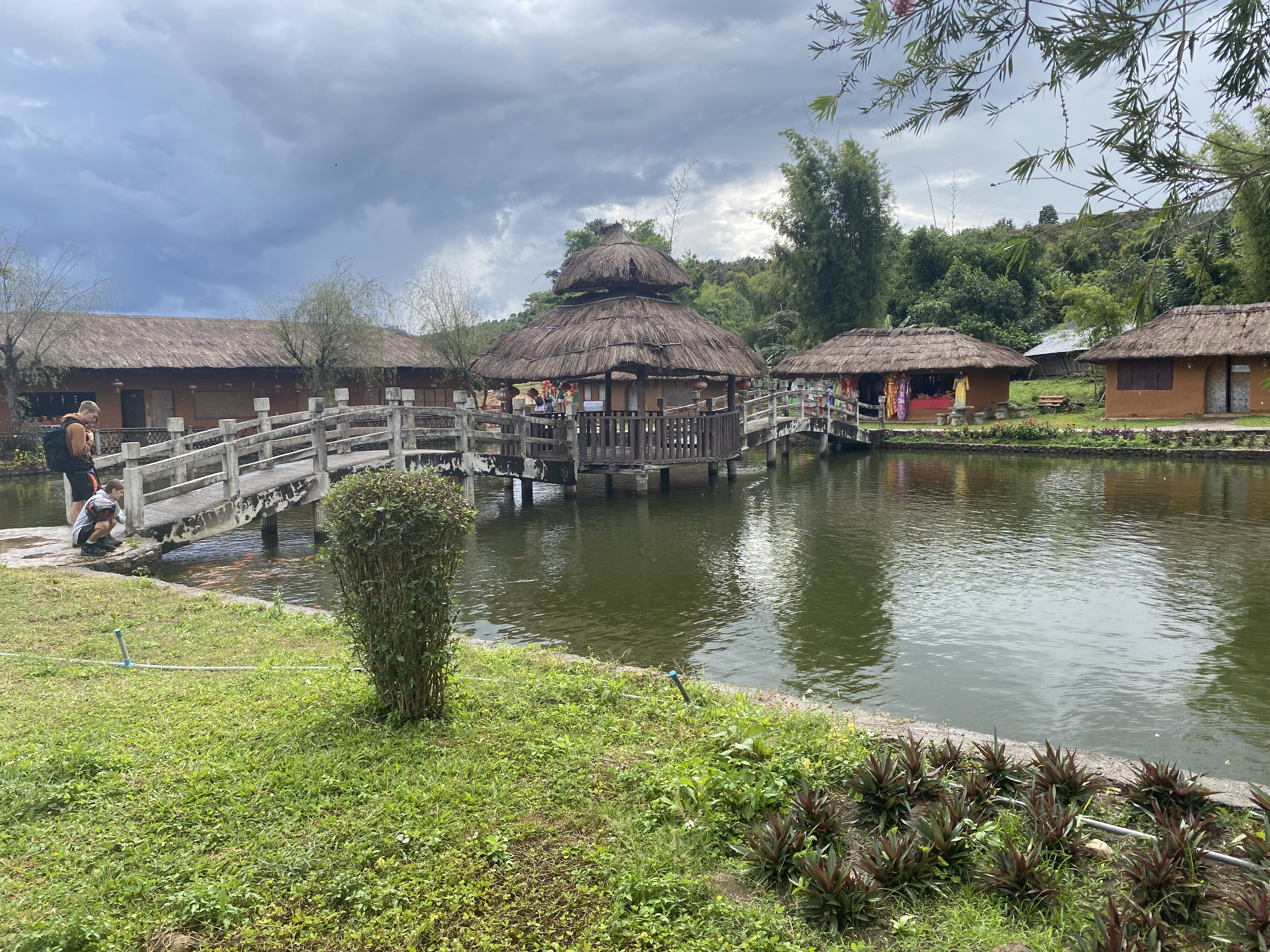
Santichon Village

== Sights ==
Pai is known as an important tourist destination of Mae Hong Son. It is therefore popular with both Thai and foreign tourists especially young people and also being used as a location for filming movies such as Ruk Jung in 2006, Pai in Love and Kat Rattakarn's Ya Kuet Nak-MV in 2009, Timeline in 2014.

- Wat Si Don Chai (Luang Sa Ri Bua Ban), the first temple of Pai, older than 700 years.
- Tha Pai Memorial Bridge
- Wat Nam Hu
- Wat Sai Khao
- Mo Paeng Waterfall
- Pam Bok Waterfall
- The Pai Secret Hot Springs
- Tha Pai Hot Spring
- Yun Lai Viewpoint
- Santichon Village, Chinese Yunan Cultural Village
- Huai Nam Dang National Park (shared with Mae Taeng and Wiang Haeng Districts of Chiang Mai Province)
- Pai River
- Kong Lan or Pai Canyon
- Pai Walking Street
