= Wiang Tai =

Tambon in Pai district, Mae Hong Son, Thailand

Coordinates: 19°22′N 98°26′E

Wiang Tai เวียงใต้
- Subdistrict
- Interactive map of Wiang Tai
- Country: Thailand
- Province: Mae Hong Son
- District: Pai

Population (2005)
  - Total: 6,493
- Time zone: UTC+7 (ICT)

Wiang Tai (Thai: เวียงใต้) is a village and tambon (sub-district) of Pai district, in Mae Hong Son province, Thailand. In 2005 it had a population of 6,493 people. The tambon contains six villages.
