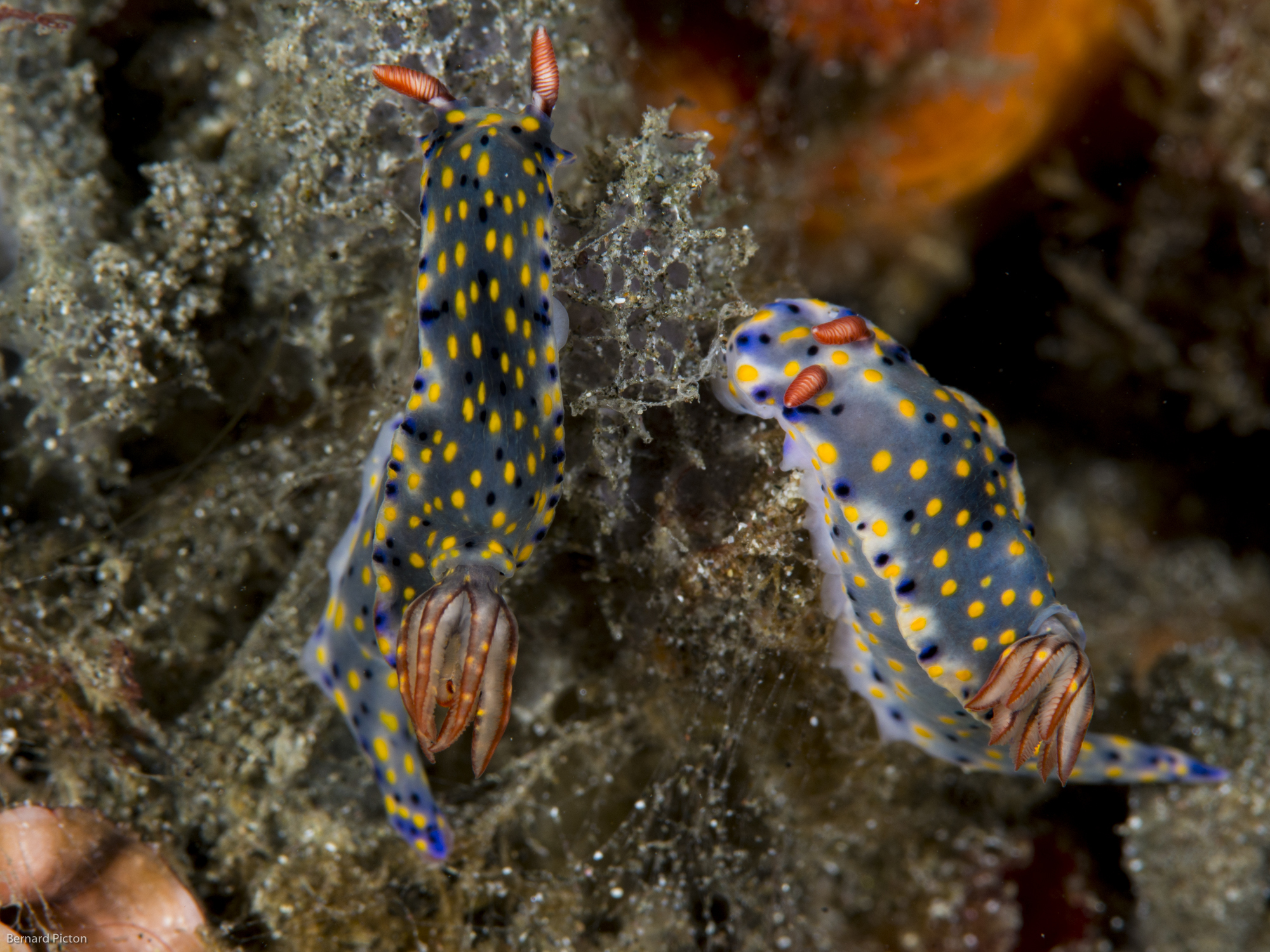

Scientific classification
- Kingdom: Animalia
- Phylum: Mollusca
- Class: Gastropoda
- Order: Nudibranchia
- Family: Chromodorididae
- Genus: Hypselodoris
- Species: H. confetti

Binomial name
- Hypselodoris confetti Gosliner & Johnson, 2018

= Hypselodoris confetti =

Species of gastropod

Hypselodoris confetti is a species of sea slug or dorid nudibranch, a marine gastropod mollusc in the family Chromodorididae.

== Distribution ==
This nudibranch was described from Siar Island, Madang, Papua New Guinea, 5.183333°S 145.80667°E. It is reported from Indonesia, Papua New Guinea, the Philippines and Hong Kong.

== Description ==
Hypselodoris confetti has previously been confused with Hypselodoris kanga. It has a white or grey semi-translucent body covered with large yellow spots and smaller blue-black spots. The dark blue spots at the edge of the mantle are often extended into patches at right angles to the margin and have a diffuse halo of bright blue around them. The gills have lines on the outer edges which are purple grading to blue and then red at the tips. The flattened outer face bears a vertical row of round yellow spots. The rhinophores have bright red clubs and blue-purple bases. Hypselodoris roo is almost identical, but with plain white, or white spots on the outer gill faces which are entirely edged with orange-red. This species can reach a total length of at least 35 mm.
