= Highway 1095 (Thailand) =

Road in Thailand

National Highway 1095
- ทางหลวงแผ่นดินหมายเลข 1095
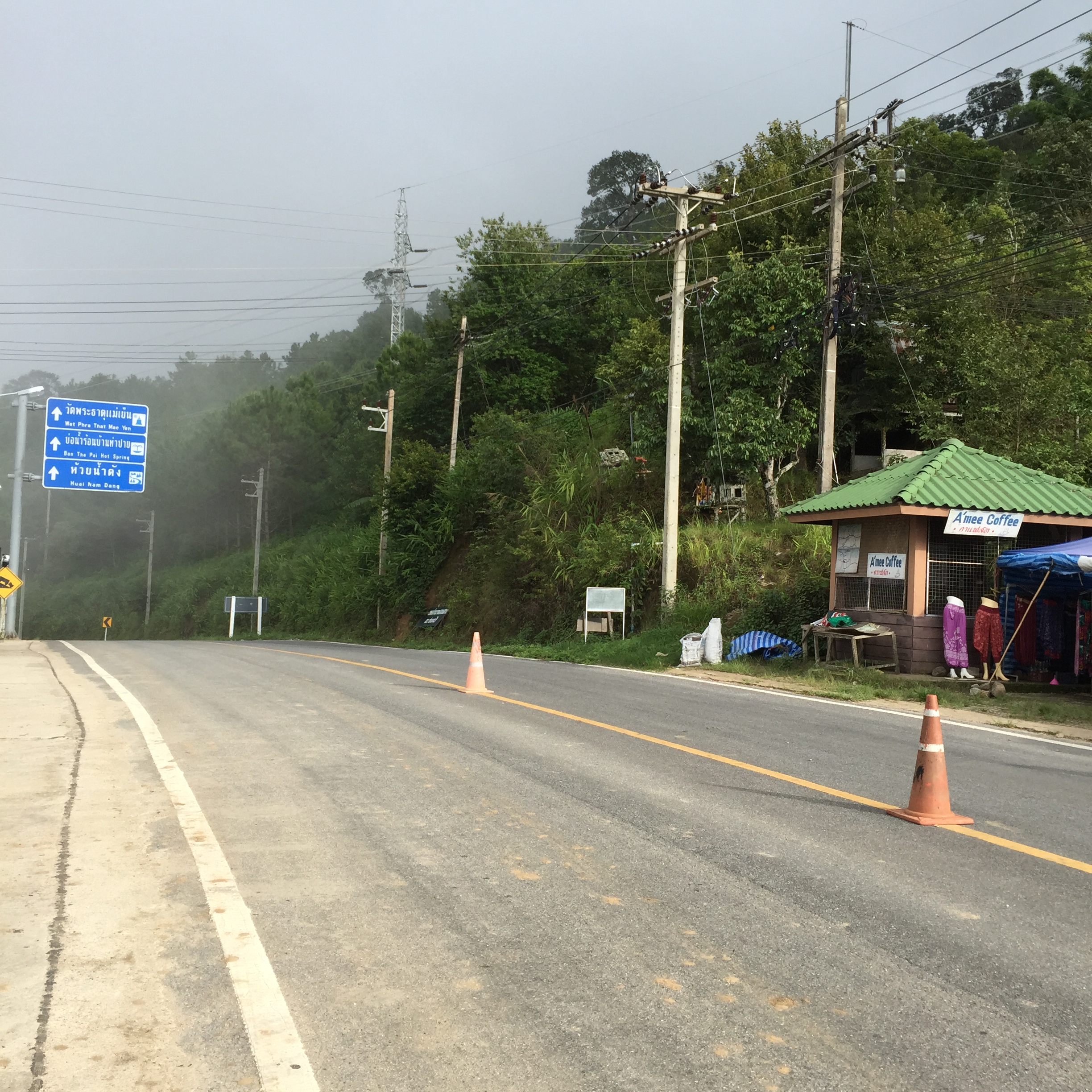
- Route 1095 in Mae Na Toeng subdistrict, Pai district

Major junctions
- East end: Highway 107, Mae Taeng district, Chiang Mai province
- West end: Highway 108, Mueang Mae Hong Son district, Mae Hong Son province

Location
- Country: Thailand

Highway system
- Highways in Thailand; Motorways; Asian Highways

Highway 1095 (Thai: ทางหลวงแผ่นดินหมายเลข 1095) is a national highway in Thailand. It connects communities and tourist attractions in the northern area of Mae Hong Son province at Pai and Pang Mapha districts. It is known for having over 2,000 winding curves and steep slopes. From Chiang Mai, the route goes to Mae Hong Son with a distance of 245 kilometres (152 mi).

== History ==
The highway was originally constructed during World War II by the Imperial Japanese Army.

== Route description ==
Highway 1095 is a two-lane road, going back and forth, originally starting at Route 107 (Chotana Road) at Mae Malai Market, Khie Lek subdistrict, Mae Taeng district, Chiang Mai province. In 1994, a new route was cut to start at Ban Nong Khong. On Highway 107, which is a route bypassing the city of Mae Malai, the route was previously designated as a rural road, HRS 3045, then Highway 1095 heads into Mae Hong Son Province, passing Pai district, Pang Mapha district and Mueang Mae Hong Son district. It enters Mae Hong Son before the route ends on Khun Lum Praphat Road through the city center and continues as Highway 108. The entire route is winding and mostly steep hills.
