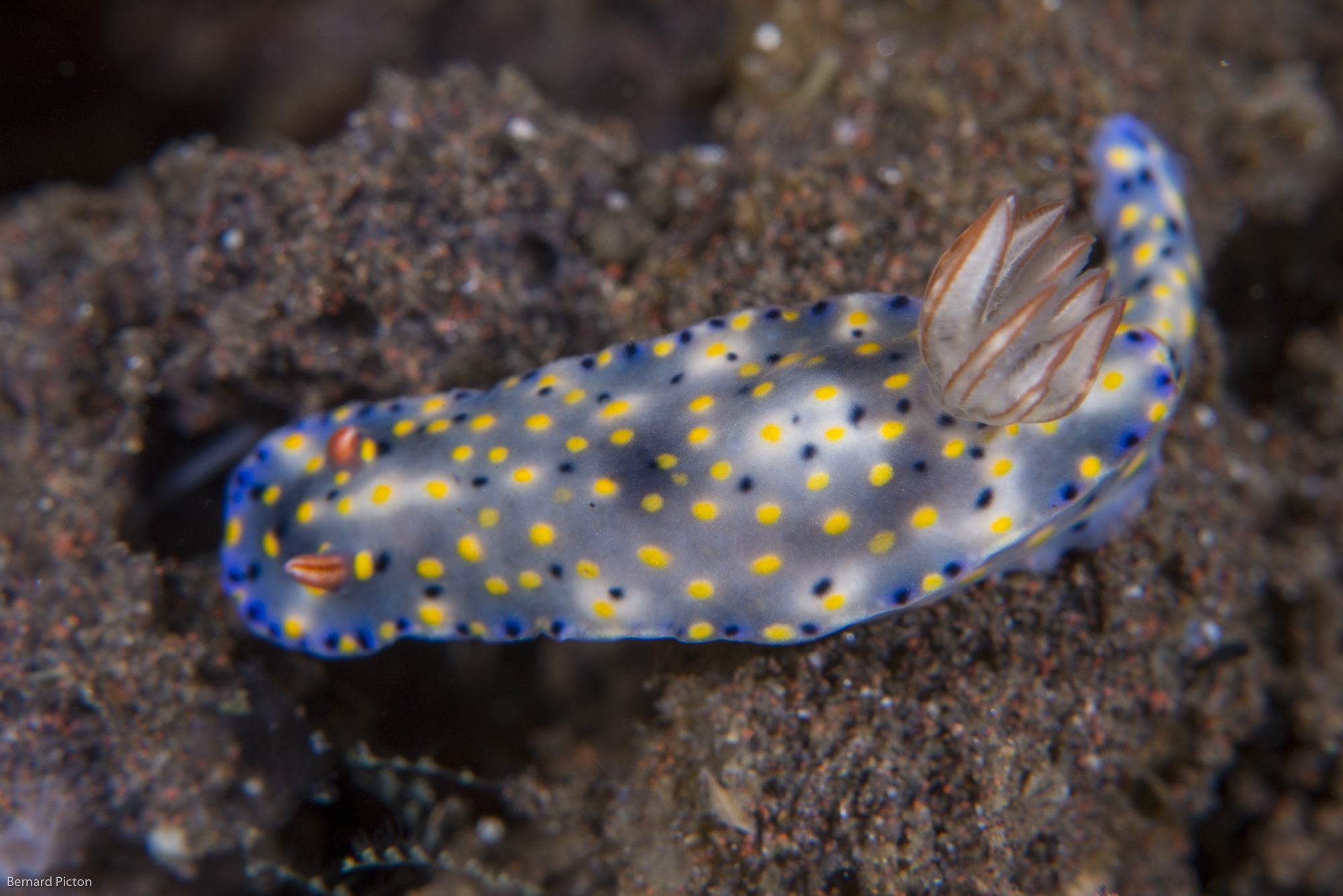
- Tulamben, Bali
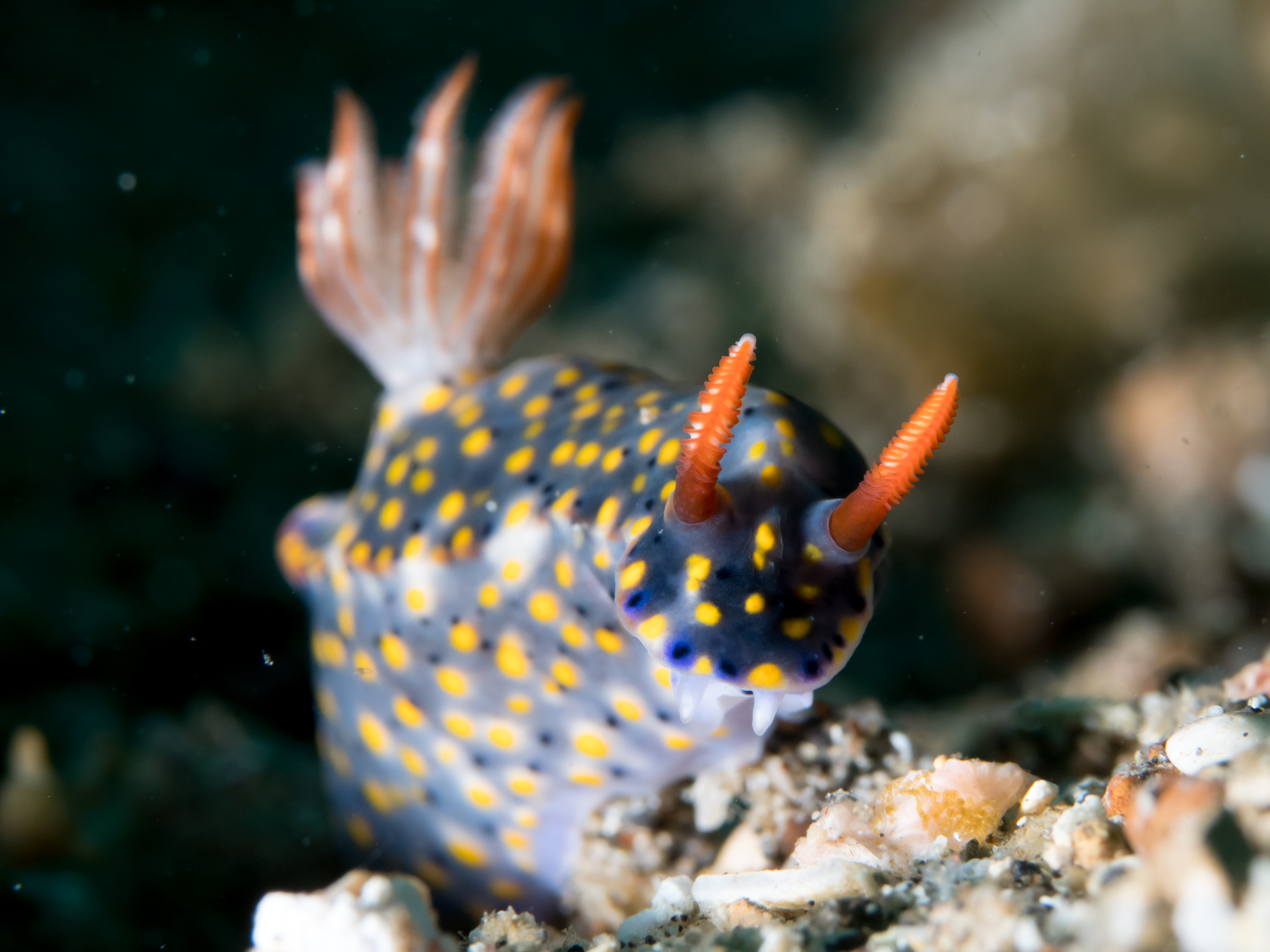
- Lembeh, Indonesia

Scientific classification
- Kingdom: Animalia
- Phylum: Mollusca
- Class: Gastropoda
- Order: Nudibranchia
- Family: Chromodorididae
- Genus: Hypselodoris
- Species: H. roo

Binomial name
- Hypselodoris roo Gosliner & Johnson, 2018

= Hypselodoris roo =

Species of gastropod

Hypselodoris roo is a species of sea slug or dorid nudibranch, a marine gastropod mollusc in the family Chromodorididae.

== Distribution ==
This nudibranch was described from Mainit Bubbles, Calumpan Peninsula, Mabini, Batangas, Luzon, Philippines, 13.68802°N 120.95809°E. It is also reported from Indonesia.

== Description ==
Hypselodoris roo has frequently been mistaken for Hypselodoris kanga. It has a white body covered with large yellow spots and smaller blue-black spots. The dark blue spots at the edge of the mantle have a diffuse halo of bright blue around them. The gills have lines on the outer edges which are orange-red and a flattened area between with opaque white spots. The rhinophores have bright red clubs and red bases. Hypselodoris confetti is almost identical to this species, but with yellow spots on the outer gill faces which are edged with lines which grade from blue-purple at the base to red at the tips.

This species can reach a total length of at least 45 mm.
