= Kan Air =

Domestic airline of Thailand (2010–2017)

IATA	ICAO	Call sign
K8	KND	KANNITHI AIR
- Founded: 24 September 2010
- Ceased operations: 20 April 2017
- Hubs: Chiang Mai International Airport
- Fleet size: 2
- Destinations: 9
- Headquarters: 100/519, Soi Kamphaeng Phet 6 soi 5 yaek 4, Chaeng Wattana Road, Thung Song Hong Subdistrict, Lak Si, Bangkok, Thailand
- Key people: Capt. Somphong Sooksanguan (President); Mrs. Saychon Sibmong (CEO)
- Website: www.kanairlines.com

Kannithi Aviation Co. Ltd, operated as Kan Air, was a small airline with its hub at Chiang Mai Airport. Kan Air operated charter and scheduled services in Thailand. As of September 2016, Kan Air flew nine routes. Flights from Chiang Mai were to Mae Hong Son, Pai, Nan, Khon Kaen, Ubon Ratchathani, Phitsanulok, Hua Hin, Chiang Rai, and U-Tapao. On 21 April 2017, Kan Air suspended all of its operations.

== History ==
Kan Air, owned by Kannithi Aviation Company Limited, started operations on 24 September 2010. It was founded by Captain Somphong Sooksanguan as president and Mrs Saychon Sibmong as CEO. On 8 July 2015, the airline was forced to suspend five routes for lack of compliance with airline operating licenses. The Kan Air suspension was lifted a few months later.

On 21 April 2017, Kan Air suspended all remaining flights due to "technical difficulties" with their last operational aircraft, a Cessna Grand Caravan 208B.

== Destinations ==
Kan Airlines operated charter and scheduled flight services with Cessna Grand Caravan C208B, Beechcraft Premier I, and ATR 72-500:

=== Domestic ===
From Chiang Mai – Chiang Mai International Airport (main hub)

- Bangkok – Don Mueang International Airport
- Hua Hin – Hua Hin Airport
- Khon Kaen – Khon Kaen Airport
- Mae Hong Son – Mae Hong Son Airport
- Nan – Nan Nakhon Airport
- Pai – Pai Airport
- Rayong – U-Tapao International Airport
- Phitsanulok – Phitsanulok Airport
- Ubon Ratchathani – Ubon Ratchathani Airport

== Fleet ==
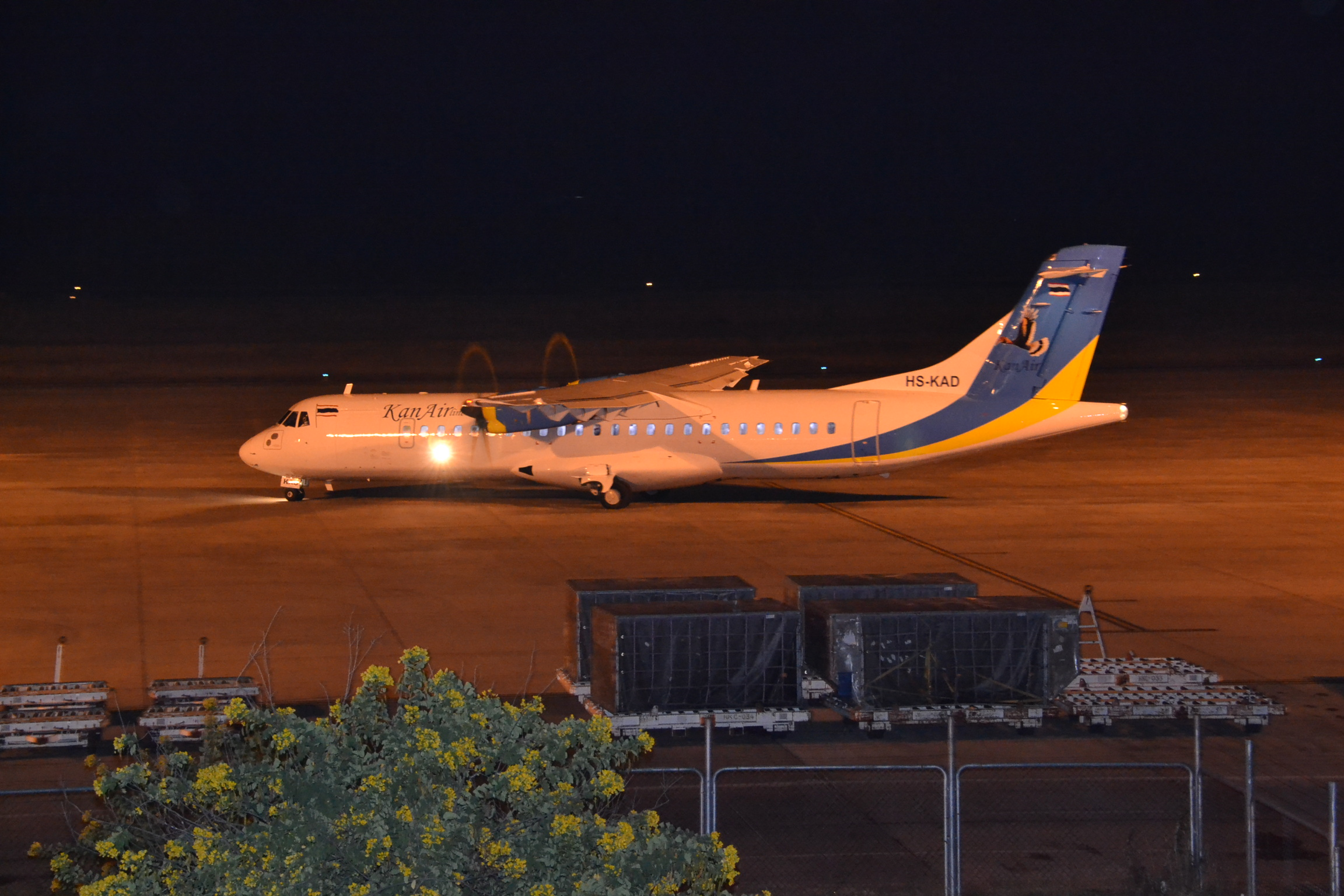
Kan Air ATR 72–500, Khon Kaen Airport, (December 2014)

As of November 2017, the Kan Air fleet consisted of the following aircraft:

Kan Air Fleet
Aircraft	In service	Orders	Passengers	Note
ATR 72-500	2	0	66
Cessna 208B Grand Caravan	1	0	12
Beechcraft Premier I	1	0	6
Total	4

== Services ==
=== Scheduled flights ===
With its base in Don Mueang, Kan Air operated daily and weekly scheduled service to destinations in northern, northeastern, and central Thailand.

=== Charter flights ===
With its base at Don Muang International Airport, Kan Air provided a more direct route to the desired location than a commercial flight. Chartering a private jet allows passengers to fly on their schedule, fly to smaller airfields closer to their final destination, and avoid the queues and chaos of major airport terminals.

=== Medical evacuation service ===
Kan Air signed a memorandum of understanding (MOU) with National Institute of Emergency Medicine to transport critically ill patients.
