= List of tambon in Thailand (H–I) =

This is a list of tambon (sub-districts) in Thailand, beginning with the letters H and I. This information is liable to change due to border changes or re-allocation of Tambons. Missing Tambon numbers show where the number is either not used or the Tambon has been transferred to a different Amphoe.

Tambon (subdistrict)	ตำบล	Amphoe (district)	อำเภอ	Changwat (province)	จังหวัด	Region
Hae Tai	แห่ใต้	Kosum Phisai	โกสุมพิสัย	Maha Sarakham	มหาสารคาม	North-East
Hai Sok	หายโศก	Phutthaisong	พุทไธสง	Buriram	บุรีรัมย์	North-East
Hai Sok	หายโศก	Ban Phue	บ้านผือ	Udon Thani	อุดรธานี	North-East
Hai Yong	ไฮหย่อง	Phang Khon	พังโคน	Sakon Nakhon	สกลนคร	North-East
Haiya	หายยา	Mueang Chiang Mai	เมืองเชียงใหม่	Chiang Mai	เชียงใหม่	North
Han Chot	หันโจด	Nong Song Hong	หนองสองห้อง	Khon Kaen	ขอนแก่น	North-East
Han Huai Sai	หันห้วยทราย	Prathai	ประทาย	Nakhon Ratchasima	นครราชสีมา	North-East
Han Kaeo	หารแก้ว	Hang Dong	หางดง	Chiang Mai	เชียงใหม่	North
Han Na Ngam	หันนางาม	Si Bun Rueang	ศรีบุญเรือง	Nong Bua Lamphu	หนองบัวลำภู	North-East
Han Pho	หานโพธิ์	Khao Chaison	เขาชัยสน	Phatthalung	พัทลุง	South
Han Sai	หันทราย	Aranyaprathet	อรัญประเทศ	Sa Kaeo	สระแก้ว	East
Han Taphao	หันตะเภา	Wang Noi	วังน้อย	Phra Nakhon Si Ayutthaya	พระนครศรีอยุธยา	Central
Han Thao	หารเทา	Pak Phayun	ปากพะยูน	Phatthalung	พัทลุง	South
Hang Chat	ห้างฉัตร	Hang Chat	ห้างฉัตร	Lampang	ลำปาง	North
Hang Dong	หางดง	Hang Dong	หางดง	Chiang Mai	เชียงใหม่	North
Hang Dong	หางดง	Hot	ฮอด	Chiang Mai	เชียงใหม่	North
Hang Hong	ฮางโฮง	Mueang Sakon Nakhon	เมืองสกลนคร	Sakon Nakhon	สกลนคร	North-East
Hang Nam Sakhon	หางน้ำสาคร	Manorom	มโนรมย์	Chai Nat	ชัยนาท	Central
Hang Sung	ห้างสูง	Nong Yai	หนองใหญ่	Chonburi	ชลบุรี	East
Hankha	หันคา	Hankha	หันคา	Chai Nat	ชัยนาท	Central
Hantra	หันตรา	Phra Nakhon Si Ayutthaya	พระนครศรีอยุธยา	Phra Nakhon Si Ayutthaya	พระนครศรีอยุธยา	Central
Hat Asa	หาดอาษา	Sapphaya	สรรพยา	Chai Nat	ชัยนาท	Central
Hat Chao Samran	หาดเจ้าสำราญ	Mueang Phetchaburi	เมืองเพชรบุรี	Phetchaburi	เพชรบุรี	West
Hat Kham	หาดขาม	Kui Buri	กุยบุรี	Prachuap Khiri Khan	ประจวบคีรีขันธ์	West
Hat Kham	หาดคำ	Mueang Nong Khai	เมืองหนองคาย	Nong Khai	หนองคาย	North-East
Hat Khamphi	หาดคัมภีร์	Pak Chom	ปากชม	Loei	เลย	North-East
Hat Kruat	หาดกรวด	Mueang Uttaradit	เมืองอุตรดิตถ์	Uttaradit	อุตรดิตถ์	North
Hat La	หาดล้า	Tha Pla	ท่าปลา	Uttaradit	อุตรดิตถ์	North
Hat Lek	หาดเล็ก	Khlong Yai	คลองใหญ่	Trat	ตราด	East
Hat Nang Kaeo	หาดนางแก้ว	Kabin Buri	กบินทร์บุรี	Prachin Buri	ปราจีนบุรี	East
Hat Ngio	หาดงิ้ว	Mueang Uttaradit	เมืองอุตรดิตถ์	Uttaradit	อุตรดิตถ์	North
Hat Phaeng	หาดแพง	Si Songkhram	ศรีสงคราม	Nakhon Phanom	นครพนม	North-East
Hat Phan Krai	หาดพันไกร	Mueang Chumphon	เมืองชุมพร	Chumphon	ชุมพร	South
Hat Sai Khao	หาดทรายขาว	Chiang Khan	เชียงคาน	Loei	เลย	North-East
Hat Sai Ri	หาดทรายรี	Mueang Chumphon	เมืองชุมพร	Chumphon	ชุมพร	South
Hat Samran	หาดสำราญ	Hat Samran	หาดสำราญ	Trang	ตรัง	South
Hat Siao	หาดเสี้ยว	Si Satchanalai	ศรีสัชนาลัย	Sukhothai	สุโขทัย	Central
Hat Som Paen	หาดส้มแป้น	Mueang Ranong	เมืองระนอง	Ranong	ระนอง	South
Hat Song Khwae	หาดสองแคว	Tron	ตรอน	Uttaradit	อุตรดิตถ์	North
Hat Sung	หาดสูง	Krok Phra	โกรกพระ	Nakhon Sawan	นครสวรรค์	Central
Hat Tha Sao	หาดท่าเสา	Mueang Chai Nat	เมืองชัยนาท	Chai Nat	ชัยนาท	Central
Hat Thanong	หาดทนง	Mueang Uthai Thani	เมืองอุทัยธานี	Uthai Thani	อุทัยธานี	Central
Hat Yai	หาดใหญ่	Hat Yai	หาดใหญ่	Songkhla	สงขลา	South
Hat Yai	หาดยาย	Lang Suan	หลังสวน	Chumphon	ชุมพร	South
Hat Yang	หาดยาง	Si Maha Phot	ศรีมหาโพธิ	Prachin Buri	ปราจีนบุรี	East
Hin Dat	หินดาด	Dan Khun Thot	ด่านขุนทด	Nakhon Ratchasima	นครราชสีมา	North-East
Hin Dat	หินดาด	Thong Pha Phum	ทองผาภูมิ	Kanchanaburi	กาญจนบุรี	West
Hin Dat	หินดาด	Huai Thalaeng	ห้วยแถลง	Nakhon Ratchasima	นครราชสีมา	North-East
Hin Dat	หินดาต	Pang Sila Thong	ปางศิลาทอง	Kamphaeng Phet	กำแพงเพชร	Central
Hin Hao	หินฮาว	Lom Kao	หล่มเก่า	Phetchabun	เพชรบูรณ์	Central
Hin Kaeo	หินแก้ว	Tha Sae	ท่าแซะ	Chumphon	ชุมพร	South
Hin Khon	หินโคน	Chakkarat	จักราช	Nakhon Ratchasima	นครราชสีมา	North-East
Hin Khon	หินโคน	Lam Plai Mat	ลำปลายมาศ	Buriram	บุรีรัมย์	North-East
Hin Kong	หินกอง	Mueang Ratchaburi	เมืองราชบุรี	Ratchaburi	ราชบุรี	West
Hin Kong	หินกอง	Suwannaphum	สุวรรณภูมิ	Roi Et	ร้อยเอ็ด	North-East
Hin Lat	หินลาด	Wat Bot	วัดโบสถ์	Phitsanulok	พิษณุโลก	Central
Hin Lat	หินลาด	Ban Kruat	บ้านกรวด	Buriram	บุรีรัมย์	North-East
Hin Lek Fai	หินเหล็กไฟ	Khu Mueang	คูเมือง	Buriram	บุรีรัมย์	North-East
Hin Mun	หินมูล	Bang Len	บางเลน	Nakhon Pathom	นครปฐม	Central
Hin Ngom	หินโงม	Mueang Nong Khai	เมืองหนองคาย	Nong Khai	หนองคาย	North-East
Hin Pak	หินปัก	Ban Mi	บ้านหมี่	Lopburi	ลพบุรี	Central
Hin Son	หินซ้อน	Kaeng Khoi	แก่งคอย	Saraburi	สระบุรี	Central
Hin Tang	หินตั้ง	Mueang Nakhon Nayok	เมืองนครนายก	Nakhon Nayok	นครนายก	Central
Hin Tang	หินตั้ง	Ban Phai	บ้านไผ่	Khon Kaen	ขอนแก่น	North-East
Hin Tok	หินตก	Ron Phibun	ร่อนพิบูลย์	Nakhon Si Thammarat	นครศรีธรรมราช	South
Hiran Ruchi	หิรัญรูจี	Khet Thon Buri	ธนบุรี	Bangkok	กรุงเทพมหานคร	Central
Ho Kham	หอคำ	Mueang Bueng Kan	เมืองบึงกาฬ	Bueng Kan	บึงกาฬ	North-East
Ho Klong	หอกลอง	Phrom Phiram	พรหมพิราม	Phitsanulok	พิษณุโลก	Central
Ho Krai	หอไกร	Bang Mun Nak	บางมูลนาก	Phichit	พิจิตร	Central
Ho Rattanachai	หอรัตนไชย	Phra Nakhon Si Ayutthaya	พระนครศรีอยุธยา	Phra Nakhon Si Ayutthaya	พระนครศรีอยุธยา	Central
Hom Kret	หอมเกร็ด	Sam Phran	สามพราน	Nakhon Pathom	นครปฐม	Central
Hom Sin	หอมศีล	Bang Pakong	บางปะกง	Chachoengsao	ฉะเชิงเทรา	East
Homok	ห่อหมก	Bang Sai	บางไทร	Phra Nakhon Si Ayutthaya	พระนครศรีอยุธยา	Central
Hong Charoen	หงษ์เจริญ	Tha Sae	ท่าแซะ	Chumphon	ชุมพร	South
Hong Hin	หงส์หิน	Chun	จุน	Phayao	พะเยา	North
Hora	โหรา	At Samat	อาจสามารถ	Roi Et	ร้อยเอ็ด	North-East
Horathep	หรเทพ	Ban Mo	บ้านหมอ	Saraburi	สระบุรี	Central
Hot	ฮอด	Hot	ฮอด	Chiang Mai	เชียงใหม่	North
Hu Chang	หูช้าง	Ban Rai	บ้านไร่	Uthai Thani	อุทัยธานี	Central
Hu Long	หูล่อง	Pak Phanang	ปากพนัง	Nakhon Si Thammarat	นครศรีธรรมราช	South
Hu Thamnop	หูทำนบ	Pakham	ปะคำ	Buriram	บุรีรัมย์	North-East
Hua Chang	หัวช้าง	Chaturaphak Phiman	จตุรพักตรพิมาน	Roi Et	ร้อยเอ็ด	North-East
Hua Chang	หัวช้าง	Uthumphon Phisai	อุทุมพรพิสัย	Sisaket	ศรีสะเกษ	North-East
Hua Chang	หัวช้าง	Suwannaphum	สุวรรณภูมิ	Roi Et	ร้อยเอ็ด	North-East
Hua Diat	หัวเดียด	Mueang Tak	เมืองตาก	Tak	ตาก	West
Hua Don	หัวดอน	Khueang Nai	เขื่องใน	Ubon Ratchathani	อุบลราชธานี	North-East
Hua Dong	หัวดง	Mueang Phichit	เมืองพิจิตร	Phichit	พิจิตร	Central
Hua Dong	หัวดง	Kao Liao	เก้าเลี้ยว	Nakhon Sawan	นครสวรรค์	Central
Hua Dong	หัวดง	Na Dun	นาดูน	Maha Sarakham	มหาสารคาม	North-East
Hua Fai	หัวฝาย	Sung Men	สูงเม่น	Phrae	แพร่	North
Hua Fai	หัวฝาย	Khaen Dong	แคนดง	Buriram	บุรีรัมย์	North-East
Hua Hin	หัวหิน	Hua Hin	หัวหิน	Prachuap Khiri Khan	ประจวบคีรีขันธ์	West
Hua Hin	หัวหิน	Huai Mek	ห้วยเม็ก	Kalasin	กาฬสินธุ์	North-East
Hua Khao	หัวเขา	Doem Bang Nang Buat	เดิมบางนางบวช	Suphan Buri	สุพรรณบุรี	Central
Hua Khao	หัวเขา	Singhanakhon	สิงหนคร	Songkhla	สงขลา	South
Hua Khwang	หัวขวาง	Kosum Phisai	โกสุมพิสัย	Maha Sarakham	มหาสารคาม	North-East
Hua Lam	หัวลำ	Tha Luang	ท่าหลวง	Lopburi	ลพบุรี	Central
Hua Mak	หัวหมาก	Khet Bang Kapi	บางกะปิ	Bangkok	กรุงเทพมหานคร	Central
Hua Mueang	หัวเมือง	Song	สอง	Phrae	แพร่	North
Hua Mueang	หัวเมือง	Mueang Pan	เมืองปาน	Lampang	ลำปาง	North
Hua Na	หัวนา	Khemarat	เขมราฐ	Ubon Ratchathani	อุบลราชธานี	North-East
Hua Na	หัวนา	Mueang Nongbua Lamphu	เมืองหนองบัวลำภู	Nong Bua Lamphu	หนองบัวลำภู	North-East
Hua Na	หัวนา	Doem Bang Nang Buat	เดิมบางนางบวช	Suphan Buri	สุพรรณบุรี	Central
Hua Na Kham	หัวนาคำ	Si That	ศรีธาตุ	Udon Thani	อุดรธานี	North-East
Hua Na Kham	หัวนาคำ	Yang Talat	ยางตลาด	Kalasin	กาฬสินธุ์	North-East
Hua Na Kham	หัวนาคำ	Kranuan	กระนวน	Khon Kaen	ขอนแก่น	North-East
Hua Ngom	หัวง้ม	Phan	พาน	Chiang Rai	เชียงราย	North
Hua Ngua	หัวงัว	Yang Talat	ยางตลาด	Kalasin	กาฬสินธุ์	North-East
Hua Ngua	หัวงัว	Sanom	สนม	Surin	สุรินทร์	North-East
Hua Nong	หัวหนอง	Ban Phai	บ้านไผ่	Khon Kaen	ขอนแก่น	North-East
Hua Pa	หัวป่า	Phrom Buri	พรหมบุรี	Sing Buri	สิงห์บุรี	Central
Hua Phai	หัวไผ่	Mueang Sing Buri	เมืองสิงห์บุรี	Sing Buri	สิงห์บุรี	Central
Hua Phai	หัวไผ่	Maha Rat	มหาราช	Phra Nakhon Si Ayutthaya	พระนครศรีอยุธยา	Central
Hua Phai	หัวไผ่	Mueang Ang Thong	เมืองอ่างทอง	Ang Thong	อ่างทอง	Central
Hua Pho	หัวโพ	Bang Phae	บางแพ	Ratchaburi	ราชบุรี	West
Hua Pho	หัวโพธิ์	Song Phi Nong	สองพี่น้อง	Suphan Buri	สุพรรณบุรี	Central
Hua Pluak	หัวปลวก	Sao Hai	เสาไห้	Saraburi	สระบุรี	Central
Hua Ro	หัวรอ	Mueang Phitsanulok	เมืองพิษณุโลก	Phitsanulok	พิษณุโลก	Central
Hua Ro	หัวรอ	Phra Nakhon Si Ayutthaya	พระนครศรีอยุธยา	Phra Nakhon Si Ayutthaya	พระนครศรีอยุธยา	Central
Hua Ruea	หัวเรือ	Mueang Ubon Ratchathani	เมืองอุบลราชธานี	Ubon Ratchathani	อุบลราชธานี	North-East
Hua Ruea	หัวเรือ	Wapi Pathum	วาปีปทุม	Maha Sarakham	มหาสารคาม	North-East
Hua Sai	หัวไทร	Hua Sai	หัวไทร	Nakhon Si Thammarat	นครศรีธรรมราช	South
Hua Sai	หัวไทร	Bang Khla	บางคล้า	Chachoengsao	ฉะเชิงเทรา	East
Hua Samrong	หัวสำโรง	Plaeng Yao	แปลงยาว	Chachoengsao	ฉะเชิงเทรา	East
Hua Samrong	หัวสำโรง	Tha Wung	ท่าวุ้ง	Lopburi	ลพบุรี	Central
Hua Saphan	หัวสะพาน	Mueang Phetchaburi	เมืองเพชรบุรี	Phetchaburi	เพชรบุรี	West
Hua Suea	หัวเสือ	Khukhan	ขุขันธ์	Sisaket	ศรีสะเกษ	North-East
Hua Suea	หัวเสือ	Mae Tha	แม่ทะ	Lampang	ลำปาง	North
Hua Taphan	หัวตะพาน	Hua Taphan	หัวตะพาน	Amnat Charoen	อำนาจเจริญ	North-East
Hua Taphan	หัวตะพาน	Wiset Chai Chan	วิเศษชัยชาญ	Ang Thong	อ่างทอง	Central
Hua Taphan	หัวตะพาน	Tha Sala	ท่าศาลา	Nakhon Si Thammarat	นครศรีธรรมราช	South
Hua Thale	หัวทะเล	Mueang Nakhon Ratchasima	เมืองนครราชสีมา	Nakhon Ratchasima	นครราชสีมา	North-East
Hua Thale	หัวทะเล	Bamnet Narong	บำเหน็จณรงค์	Chaiyaphum	ชัยภูมิ	North-East
Hua Thanon	หัวถนน	Phanat Nikhom	พนัสนิคม	Chonburi	ชลบุรี	East
Hua Thanon	หัวถนน	Nang Rong	นางรอง	Buriram	บุรีรัมย์	North-East
Hua Thanon	หัวถนน	Tha Tako	ท่าตะโก	Nakhon Sawan	นครสวรรค์	Central
Hua Thanon	หัวถนน	Khlong Khlung	คลองขลุง	Kamphaeng Phet	กำแพงเพชร	Central
Hua Thon	หัวโทน	Suwannaphum	สุวรรณภูมิ	Roi Et	ร้อยเอ็ด	North-East
Hua Thung	หัวทุ่ง	Phon	พล	Khon Kaen	ขอนแก่น	North-East
Hua Thung	หัวทุ่ง	Long	ลอง	Phrae	แพร่	North
Hua Toei	หัวเตย	Phunphin	พุนพิน	Surat Thani	สุราษฎร์ธานี	South
Hua Wa	หัวหว้า	Si Maha Phot	ศรีมหาโพธิ	Prachin Buri	ปราจีนบุรี	East
Hua Wai	หัวหวาย	Takhli	ตาคลี	Nakhon Sawan	นครสวรรค์	Central
Hua Wiang	หัวเวียง	Mueang Lampang	เมืองลำปาง	Lampang	ลำปาง	North
Hua Wiang	หัวเวียง	Sena	เสนา	Phra Nakhon Si Ayutthaya	พระนครศรีอยุธยา	Central
Huai	ห้วย	Pathum Ratchawongsa	ปทุมราชวงศา	Amnat Charoen	อำนาจเจริญ	North-East
Huai Aeng	ห้วยแอ่ง	Mueang Maha Sarakham	เมืองมหาสารคาม	Maha Sarakham	มหาสารคาม	North-East
Huai Bo Suen	ห้วยบ่อซืน	Pak Chom	ปากชม	Loei	เลย	North-East
Huai Bong	ห้วยบง	Dan Khun Thot	ด่านขุนทด	Nakhon Ratchasima	นครราชสีมา	North-East
Huai Bong	ห้วยบง	Mueang Chaiyaphum	เมืองชัยภูมิ	Chaiyaphum	ชัยภูมิ	North-East
Huai Bong	ห้วยบง	Chaloem Phra Kiat	เฉลิมพระเกียรติ	Saraburi	สระบุรี	Central
Huai Chan	ห้วยจันทร์	Khun Han	ขุนหาญ	Sisaket	ศรีสะเกษ	North-East
Huai Chan	ห้วยชัน	In Buri	อินทร์บุรี	Sing Buri	สิงห์บุรี	Central
Huai Chomphu	ห้วยชมภู	Mueang Chiang Rai	เมืองเชียงราย	Chiang Rai	เชียงราย	North
Huai Chorakhe	ห้วยจรเข้	Mueang Nakhon Pathom	เมืองนครปฐม	Nakhon Phanom	นครพนม	North-East
Huai Chot	ห้วยโจด	Watthana Nakhon	วัฒนานคร	Sa Kaeo	สระแก้ว	East
Huai Chot	ห้วยโจด	Kranuan	กระนวน	Khon Kaen	ขอนแก่น	North-East
Huai Duan	ห้วยด้วน	Don Tum	ดอนตูม	Nakhon Pathom	นครปฐม	Central
Huai Fai Phatthana	ห้วยฝ้ายพัฒนา	Trakan Phuet Phon	ตระการพืชผล	Ubon Ratchathani	อุบลราชธานี	North-East
Huai Haeng	ห้วยแห้ง	Ban Rai	บ้านไร่	Uthai Thani	อุทัยธานี	Central
Huai Haeng	ห้วยแห้ง	Kaeng Khoi	แก่งคอย	Saraburi	สระบุรี	Central
Huai Hia	ห้วยเฮี้ย	Nakhon Thai	นครไทย	Phitsanulok	พิษณุโลก	Central
Huai Hin	ห้วยหิน	Nong Hong	หนองหงส์	Buriram	บุรีรัมย์	North-East
Huai Hin	ห้วยหิน	Chai Badan	ชัยบาดาล	Lopburi	ลพบุรี	Central
Huai Hin Lat	ห้วยหินลาด	Suwannaphum	สุวรรณภูมิ	Roi Et	ร้อยเอ็ด	North-East
Huai Hom	ห้วยหอม	Takhli	ตาคลี	Nakhon Sawan	นครสวรรค์	Central
Huai Hom	ห้วยห้อม	Mae La Noi	แม่ลาน้อย	Mae Hong Son	แม่ฮ่องสอน	North
Huai Kae	ห้วยแก	Chonnabot	ชนบท	Khon Kaen	ขอนแก่น	North-East
Huai Kaeo	ห้วยแก้ว	Phu Kamyao	ภูกามยาว	Phayao	พะเยา	North
Huai Kaeo	ห้วยแก้ว	Bueng Na Rang	บึงนาราง	Phichit	พิจิตร	Central
Huai Kaeo	ห้วยแก้ว	Mae On	แม่ออน	Chiang Mai	เชียงใหม่	North
Huai Kapi	ห้วยกะปิ	Mueang Chonburi	เมืองชลบุรี	Chonburi	ชลบุรี	East
Huai Ket	ห้วยเกตุ	Taphan Hin	ตะพานหิน	Phichit	พิจิตร	Central
Huai Kha	ห้วยข่า	Buntharik	บุณฑริก	Ubon Ratchathani	อุบลราชธานี	North-East
Huai Khaen	ห้วยแคน	Huai Thalaeng	ห้วยแถลง	Nakhon Ratchasima	นครราชสีมา	North-East
Huai Khamin	ห้วยขมิ้น	Dan Chang	ด่านช้าง	Suphan Buri	สุพรรณบุรี	Central
Huai Khamin	ห้วยขมิ้น	Nong Khae	หนองแค	Saraburi	สระบุรี	Central
Huai Khan Laen	ห้วยคันแหลน	Wiset Chai Chan	วิเศษชัยชาญ	Ang Thong	อ่างทอง	Central
Huai Khao Kam	ห้วยข้าวก่ำ	Chun	จุน	Phayao	พะเยา	North
Huai Khayeng	ห้วยเขย่ง	Thong Pha Phum	ทองผาภูมิ	Kanchanaburi	กาญจนบุรี	West
Huai Khayung	ห้วยขะยูง	Warin Chamrap	วารินชำราบ	Ubon Ratchathani	อุบลราชธานี	North-East
Huai Khen	ห้วยเขน	Bang Mun Nak	บางมูลนาก	Phichit	พิจิตร	Central
Huai Khong	ห้วยข้อง	Ban Lat	บ้านลาด	Phetchaburi	เพชรบุรี	West
Huai Khot	ห้วยคต	Huai Khot	ห้วยคด	Uthai Thani	อุทัยธานี	Central
Huai Khrai	ห้วยไคร้	Mae Sai	แม่สาย	Chiang Rai	เชียงราย	North
Huai Khun Ram	ห้วยขุนราม	Phatthana Nikhom	พัฒนานิคม	Lopburi	ลพบุรี	Central
Huai Khwang	ห้วยขวาง	Khet Huai Khwang	ห้วยขวาง	Bangkok	กรุงเทพมหานคร	Central
Huai Khwang	ห้วยขวาง	Kamphaeng Saen	กำแพงแสน	Nakhon Pathom	นครปฐม	Central
Huai Koeng	ห้วยเกิ้ง	Kumphawapi	กุมภวาปี	Udon Thani	อุดรธานี	North-East
Huai Krachao	ห้วยกระเจา	Huai Krachao	ห้วยกระเจา	Kanchanaburi	กาญจนบุรี	West
Huai Krathing	ห้วยกระทิง	Krong Pinang (Malay: Kampung Pinang)	กรงปินัง	Yala	ยะลา	South
Huai Krot Phatthana	ห้วยกรดพัฒนา	Sankhaburi	สรรคบุรี	Chai Nat	ชัยนาท	Central
Huai Krot	ห้วยกรด	Sankhaburi	สรรคบุรี	Chai Nat	ชัยนาท	Central
Huai Lan	ห้วยลาน	Dok Khamtai	ดอกคำใต้	Phayao	พะเยา	North
Huai Lua	ห้วยหลัว	Ban Muang	บ้านม่วง	Sakon Nakhon	สกลนคร	North-East
Huai Luek	ห้วยลึก	Ban Lat	บ้านลาด	Phetchaburi	เพชรบุรี	West
Huai Luek	ห้วยลึก	Khuan Niang	ควนเนียง	Songkhla	สงขลา	South
Huai Ma	ห้วยม้า	Mueang Phrae	เมืองแพร่	Phrae	แพร่	North
Huai Mae Phriang	ห้วยแม่เพรียง	Kaeng Krachan	แก่งกระจาน	Phetchaburi	เพชรบุรี	West
Huai Mai	ห้วยหม้าย	Song	สอง	Phrae	แพร่	North
Huai Mek	ห้วยเม็ก	Huai Mek	ห้วยเม็ก	Kalasin	กาฬสินธุ์	North-East
Huai Mon Thong	ห้วยหมอนทอง	Kamphaeng Saen	กำแพงแสน	Nakhon Pathom	นครปฐม	Central
Huai Muang	ห้วยม่วง	Kamphaeng Saen	กำแพงแสน	Nakhon Pathom	นครปฐม	Central
Huai Muang	ห้วยม่วง	Phu Pha Man	ภูผาม่าน	Khon Kaen	ขอนแก่น	North-East
Huai Mun	ห้วยมุ่น	Nam Pat	น้ำปาด	Uttaradit	อุตรดิตถ์	North
Huai Nam Hom	ห้วยน้ำหอม	Lat Yao	ลาดยาว	Nakhon Sawan	นครสวรรค์	Central
Huai Nam Khao	ห้วยน้ำขาว	Khlong Thom	คลองท่อม	Krabi	กระบี่	South
Huai Nang	ห้วยนาง	Huai Yot	ห้วยยอด	Trang	ตรัง	South
Huai Ngu	ห้วยงู	Hankha	หันคา	Chai Nat	ชัยนาท	Central
Huai Nuea	ห้วยเหนือ	Khukhan	ขุขันธ์	Sisaket	ศรีสะเกษ	North-East
Huai O	ห้วยอ้อ	Long	ลอง	Phrae	แพร่	North
Huai Pa Wai	ห้วยป่าหวาย	Phra Phutthabat	พระพุทธบาท	Saraburi	สระบุรี	Central
Huai Pha	ห้วยผา	Mueang Mae Hong Son	เมืองแม่ฮ่องสอน	Mae Hong Son	แม่ฮ่องสอน	North
Huai Phai	ห้วยไผ่	Mueang Ratchaburi	เมืองราชบุรี	Ratchaburi	ราชบุรี	West
Huai Phai	ห้วยไผ่	Khong Chiam	โขงเจียม	Ubon Ratchathani	อุบลราชธานี	North-East
Huai Phai	ห้วยไผ่	Sawaeng Ha	แสวงหา	Ang Thong	อ่างทอง	Central
Huai Phichai	ห้วยพิชัย	Pak Chom	ปากชม	Loei	เลย	North-East
Huai Phlu	ห้วยพลู	Nakhon Chai Si	นครชัยศรี	Nakhon Pathom	นครปฐม	Central
Huai Pho	ห้วยโพธิ์	Mueang Kalasin	เมืองกาฬสินธุ์	Kalasin	กาฬสินธุ์	North-East
Huai Phra	ห้วยพระ	Don Tum	ดอนตูม	Nakhon Pathom	นครปฐม	Central
Huai Phuk	ห้วยพุก	Dong Charoen	ดงเจริญ	Phichit	พิจิตร	Central
Huai Pong	ห้วยโป่ง	Mueang Rayong	เมืองระยอง	Rayong	ระยอง	East
Huai Pong	ห้วยโป่ง	Mueang Mae Hong Son	เมืองแม่ฮ่องสอน	Mae Hong Son	แม่ฮ่องสอน	North
Huai Pong	ห้วยโป่ง	Khok Samrong	โคกสำโรง	Lopburi	ลพบุรี	Central
Huai Pong	ห้วยโป่ง	Nong Phai	หนองไผ่	Phetchabun	เพชรบูรณ์	Central
Huai Prik	ห้วยปริก	Chawang	ฉวาง	Nakhon Si Thammarat	นครศรีธรรมราช	South
Huai Pu Ling	ห้วยปูลิง	Mueang Mae Hong Son	เมืองแม่ฮ่องสอน	Mae Hong Son	แม่ฮ่องสอน	North
Huai Racha	ห้วยราชา	Huai Rat	ห้วยราช	Buriram	บุรีรัมย์	North-East
Huai Raeng	ห้วยแร้ง	Mueang Trat	เมืองตราด	Trat	ตราด	East
Huai Rai	ห้วยไร่	Lom Sak	หล่มสัก	Phetchabun	เพชรบูรณ์	Central
Huai Rai	ห้วยไร่	Mueang Amnat Charoen	เมืองอำนาจเจริญ	Amnat Charoen	อำนาจเจริญ	North-East
Huai Rai	ห้วยไร่	Den Chai	เด่นชัย	Phrae	แพร่	North
Huai Rai	ห้วยไร่	Khon Sawan	คอนสวรรค์	Chaiyaphum	ชัยภูมิ	North-East
Huai Rat	ห้วยราช	Huai Rat	ห้วยราช	Buriram	บุรีรัมย์	North-East
Huai Rong	ห้วยโรง	Rong Kwang	ร้องกวาง	Phrae	แพร่	North
Huai Rong	ห้วยโรง	Khao Yoi	เขาย้อย	Phetchaburi	เพชรบุรี	West
Huai Rop	ห้วยรอบ	Nong Khayang	หนองขาหย่าง	Uthai Thani	อุทัยธานี	Central
Huai Ruam	ห้วยร่วม	Dong Charoen	ดงเจริญ	Phichit	พิจิตร	Central
Huai Ruam	ห้วยร่วม	Nong Bua	หนองบัว	Nakhon Sawan	นครสวรรค์	Central
Huai Sai	ห้วยทราย	San Kamphaeng	สันกำแพง	Chiang Mai	เชียงใหม่	North
Huai Sai	ห้วยทราย	Nong Khae	หนองแค	Saraburi	สระบุรี	Central
Huai Sai	ห้วยทราย	Mueang Prachuap Khiri Khan	เมืองประจวบคีรีขันธ์	Prachuap Khiri Khan	ประจวบคีรีขันธ์	West
Huai Sai	ห้วยทราย	Mae Rim	แม่ริม	Chiang Mai	เชียงใหม่	North
Huai Sai Nua	ห้วยทรายเหนือ	Cha-am	ชะอำ	Phetchaburi	เพชรบุรี	West
Huai Sak	ห้วยสัก	Mueang Chiang Rai	เมืองเชียงราย	Chiang Rai	เชียงราย	North
Huai Sakae	ห้วยสะแก	Mueang Phetchabun	เมืองเพชรบูรณ์	Phetchabun	เพชรบูรณ์	Central
Huai Sam Phat	ห้วยสามพาด	Prachaksinlapakhom	ประจักษ์ศิลปาคม	Udon Thani	อุดรธานี	North-East
Huai Samran	ห้วยสำราญ	Khukhan	ขุขันธ์	Sisaket	ศรีสะเกษ	North-East
Huai Samran	ห้วยสำราญ	Krasang	กระสัง	Buriram	บุรีรัมย์	North-East
Huai Sisiat	ห้วยสีเสียด	Phu Luang	ภูหลวง	Loei	เลย	North-East
Huai So	ห้วยซ้อ	Chiang Khong	เชียงของ	Chiang Rai	เชียงราย	North
Huai Som	ห้วยส้ม	Phu Kradueng	ภูกระดึง	Loei	เลย	North-East
Huai Ta Mon	ห้วยตามอญ	Benchalak	เบญจลักษ์	Sisaket	ศรีสะเกษ	North-East
Huai Ta Mon	ห้วยตามอญ	Phu Sing	ภูสิงห์	Sisaket	ศรีสะเกษ	North-East
Huai Tai	ห้วยใต้	Khukhan	ขุขันธ์	Sisaket	ศรีสะเกษ	North-East
Huai Tha Chang	ห้วยท่าช้าง	Khao Yoi	เขาย้อย	Phetchaburi	เพชรบุรี	West
Huai Thalaeng	ห้วยแถลง	Huai Thalaeng	ห้วยแถลง	Nakhon Ratchasima	นครราชสีมา	North-East
Huai Thap Mon	ห้วยทับมอญ	Khao Chamao	เขาชะเมา	Rayong	ระยอง	East
Huai Thap Than	ห้วยทับทัน	Huai Thap Than	ห้วยทับทัน	Sisaket	ศรีสะเกษ	North-East
Huai Thua Nuea	ห้วยถั่วเหนือ	Nong Bua	หนองบัว	Nakhon Sawan	นครสวรรค์	Central
Huai Thua Tai	ห้วยถั่วใต้	Nong Bua	หนองบัว	Nakhon Sawan	นครสวรรค์	Central
Huai Toei	ห้วยเตย	Kut Rang	กุดรัง	Maha Sarakham	มหาสารคาม	North-East
Huai Toei	ห้วยเตย	Sam Sung	ซำสูง	Khon Kaen	ขอนแก่น	North-East
Huai Ton	ห้วยต้อน	Mueang Chaiyaphum	เมืองชัยภูมิ	Chaiyaphum	ชัยภูมิ	North-East
Huai Tuekchu	ห้วยตึ๊กชู	Phu Sing	ภูสิงห์	Sisaket	ศรีสะเกษ	North-East
Huai Yae	ห้วยแย้	Nong Bua Rawe	หนองบัวระเหว	Chaiyaphum	ชัยภูมิ	North-East
Huai Yai	ห้วยใหญ่	Mueang Phetchabun	เมืองเพชรบูรณ์	Phetchabun	เพชรบูรณ์	Central
Huai Yai	ห้วยใหญ่	Sa Bot	สระโบสถ์	Lopburi	ลพบุรี	Central
Huai Yai	ห้วยใหญ่	Bang Lamung	บางละมุง	Chonburi	ชลบุรี	East
Huai Yai	ห้วยใหญ่	Nong Bua	หนองบัว	Nakhon Sawan	นครสวรรค์	Central
Huai Yai Chio	ห้วยยายจิ๋ว	Thep Sathit	เทพสถิต	Chaiyaphum	ชัยภูมิ	North-East
Huai Yang	ห้วยยั้ง	Phran Kratai	พรานกระต่าย	Kamphaeng Phet	กำแพงเพชร	Central
Huai Yang	ห้วยยาง	Mueang Sakon Nakhon	เมืองสกลนคร	Sakon Nakhon	สกลนคร	North-East
Huai Yang	ห้วยยาง	Klaeng	แกลง	Rayong	ระยอง	East
Huai Yang	ห้วยยาง	Khong Chiam	โขงเจียม	Ubon Ratchathani	อุบลราชธานี	North-East
Huai Yang	ห้วยยาง	Bua Yai	บัวใหญ่	Nakhon Ratchasima	นครราชสีมา	North-East
Huai Yang	ห้วยยาง	Khon San	คอนสาร	Chaiyaphum	ชัยภูมิ	North-East
Huai Yang	ห้วยยาง	Kranuan	กระนวน	Khon Kaen	ขอนแก่น	North-East
Huai Yang	ห้วยยาง	Thap Sakae	ทับสะแก	Prachuap Khiri Khan	ประจวบคีรีขันธ์	West
Huai Yang Kham	ห้วยยางขาม	Chun	จุน	Phayao	พะเยา	North
Huai Yang Thon	ห้วยยางโทน	Pak Tho	ปากท่อ	Ratchaburi	ราชบุรี	West
Huai Yap	ห้วยยาบ	Ban Thi	บ้านธิ	Lamphun	ลำพูน	North
Huai Yot	ห้วยยอด	Huai Yot	ห้วยยอด	Trang	ตรัง	South
Huai Yung	ห้วยยูง	Nuea Khlong	เหนือคลอง	Krabi	กระบี่	South
Huang Nam Khao	ห้วงน้ำขาว	Mueang Trat	เมืองตราด	Trat	ตราด	East
Hukwang	หูกวาง	Banphot Phisai	บรรพตพิสัย	Nakhon Sawan	นครสวรรค์	Central
I Lam	อี่หล่ำ	Uthumphon Phisai	อุทุมพรพิสัย	Sisaket	ศรีสะเกษ	North-East
I Ngong	อีง่อง	Chaturaphak Phiman	จตุรพักตรพิมาน	Roi Et	ร้อยเอ็ด	North-East
I Pat	อีปาด	Kanthararom	กันทรารมย์	Sisaket	ศรีสะเกษ	North-East
I Se	อีเซ	Pho Si Suwan	โพธิ์ศรีสุวรรณ	Sisaket	ศรีสะเกษ	North-East
I-pan	อิปัน	Phrasaeng	พระแสง	Surat Thani	สุราษฎร์ธานี	South
In Buri	อินทร์บุรี	In Buri	อินทร์บุรี	Sing Buri	สิงห์บุรี	Central
In Khiri	อินคีรี	Phrom Khiri	พรหมคีรี	Nakhon Si Thammarat	นครศรีธรรมราช	South
In Plaeng	อินทร์แปลง	Wanon Niwat	วานรนิวาส	Sakon Nakhon	สกลนคร	North-East
Inthakhin	อินทขิล	Mae Taeng	แม่แตง	Chiang Mai	เชียงใหม่	North
Inthapramun	อินทประมูล	Pho Thong	โพธิ์ทอง	Ang Thong	อ่างทอง	Central
Ipum	อิปุ่ม	Dan Sai	ด่านซ้าย	Loei	เลย	North-East
Isan Khet	อีสานเขต	Chaloem Phra Kiat	เฉลิมพระเกียรติ	Buriram	บุรีรัมย์	North-East
Isan	อิสาณ	Mueang Buriram	เมืองบุรีรัมย์	Buriram	บุรีรัมย์	North-East
Itue	อิตื้อ	Yang Talat	ยางตลาด	Kalasin	กาฬสินธุ์	North-East

== See also ==
- Organization of the government of Thailand
- List of districts of Thailand
- List of districts of Bangkok
- List of tambon in Thailand
- Provinces of Thailand
- List of municipalities in Thailand
