= Hot =

Hot commonly refers to:

- Heat, a hot temperature
- Pungency, in food, a spicy or hot quality

Hot or HOT may also refer to:

== Places ==
- Hot district, a district of Chiang Mai province, Thailand
  - Hot subdistrict, a sub-district of Hot District, Thailand
  - Tha Kham, Chiang Mai, also known as Hot, a town in Hot District, Chiang Mai province, Thailand
- Hot, Albania, a village in the Malësi e Madhe municipality, Shkodër County, Albania

== Music ==
- H.O.T. pronounced "H. O. T.", (High-Five of Teenagers), a South Korean boy band
- Hawaii Opera Theatre, an opera company in Honolulu, Hawaii
- Hot (American vocal group), best known for 1977 hit "Angel in Your Arms" 1976–1980

=== Albums ===
- Hot (James Brown album) or the title song (see below), 1976
- Hot (Freda Payne album), 1979
- Hot (Paul Bley album), 1985
- Hot (Half Japanese album), 1995
- Hot (Squirrel Nut Zippers album), 1996
- Hot (Mel B album), 2000
- Hot (Taeyang EP), or the title song, 2008
- Hot (Inna album) or the title song (see below), 2009
- Hot (Le Sserafim EP), 2025

=== Songs ===
- "Hot (I Need to Be Loved, Loved, Loved)", by James Brown, 1975
- "Hot", by Black Eyed Peas from Bridging the Gap, 2000
- "Hot!", by Lisa Lopes from Supernova, 2001
- "Hot", by Smash Mouth from Get the Picture?, 2003
- "Hot" (Beatnuts song), 2004
- "Hot" (Avril Lavigne song), 2007
- "Hot" (Inna song), 2008
- "Hot" (Young Thug song), 2019
- "Hot", by Parah Dice, 2019
- "Hot", by Twice from Fancy You, 2019
- "Hot", by Aya Nakamura from Aya, 2020
- "Hot" (Pia Mia song), 2020
- "Hot" (Daddy Yankee song), 2022
- "Hot" (Seventeen song), 2022
- "Hot", by Cigarettes After Sex from X's, 2024
- "Hot" (Le Sserafim song), 2025

=== Radio ===
- Hot FM, several radio networks/stations
- Hot 97, branding for hip-hop radio station WQHT in New York City

== Transport ==
- Head-of-train device, a console for the end-of-train device
- High-occupancy toll lane, a variable toll payable by some road users
- HOT, the IATA and FAA LID codes for Memorial Field Airport in the state of Arkansas, US
- HOT, the MTR station code for Ho Tin stop in Hong Kong, China
- HOT, the National Rail code for Henley-on-Thames railway station in the county of Oxfordshire, UK

== Other uses ==
- Hot, a wine tasting descriptor
- HOT Bowl or C.H.A.M.P.S. Heart of Texas Bowl, a college football game
- HOT (missile), an anti-tank missile system (French: Haut subsonique Optiquement Téléguidé)
- A series of psychedelic phenethylamines:
  - HOT-2
  - HOT-7
  - HOT-17
- Hawaii Ocean Time-series, an oceanographic time-series study
- Highly optimized tolerance, a general framework for studying complexity
- Higher-order thought, a concept in higher-order thought theories of consciousness
- Hot (Israel), an Israeli cable company
- Hawkes Ocean Technologies, a developer of deep sea equipment
- Hot, cold, wet, and dry are aspects of the discredited theory of humorism
- H.O.T. TV: Hindi Ordinaryong Tsismis, Philippine talk show
- Humanitarian OpenStreetMap Team (HOT), a nonprofit organisation promoting community mapping

== See also ==
- Heat
- Hots (disambiguation)
- Hotness (disambiguation)
- Hot Hot Hot (disambiguation)
- Hot zone (disambiguation)
- Hotspot (disambiguation)
- Hotbox (disambiguation)
