= Mae Hong Son (disambiguation) =

Mae Hong Son may refer to these places in Thailand:

- the town Mae Hong Son
- Mae Hong Son Province
- Mae Hong Son district
- Mae Hong Son Airport
