= Pang Ung =

- Pang Oung
- Thai: ปางอุ๋ง
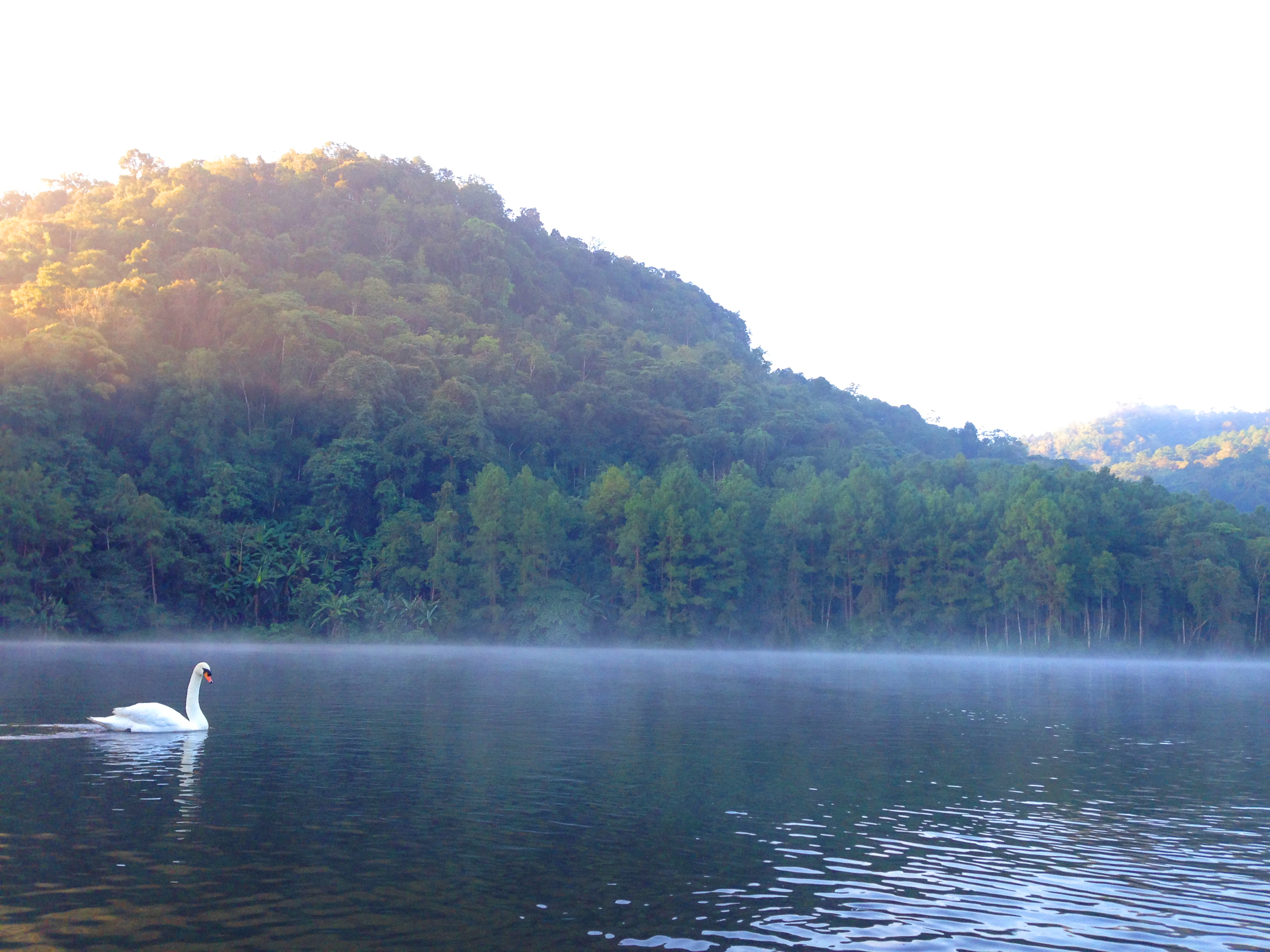
- White swan swimming in Pang Ung lake

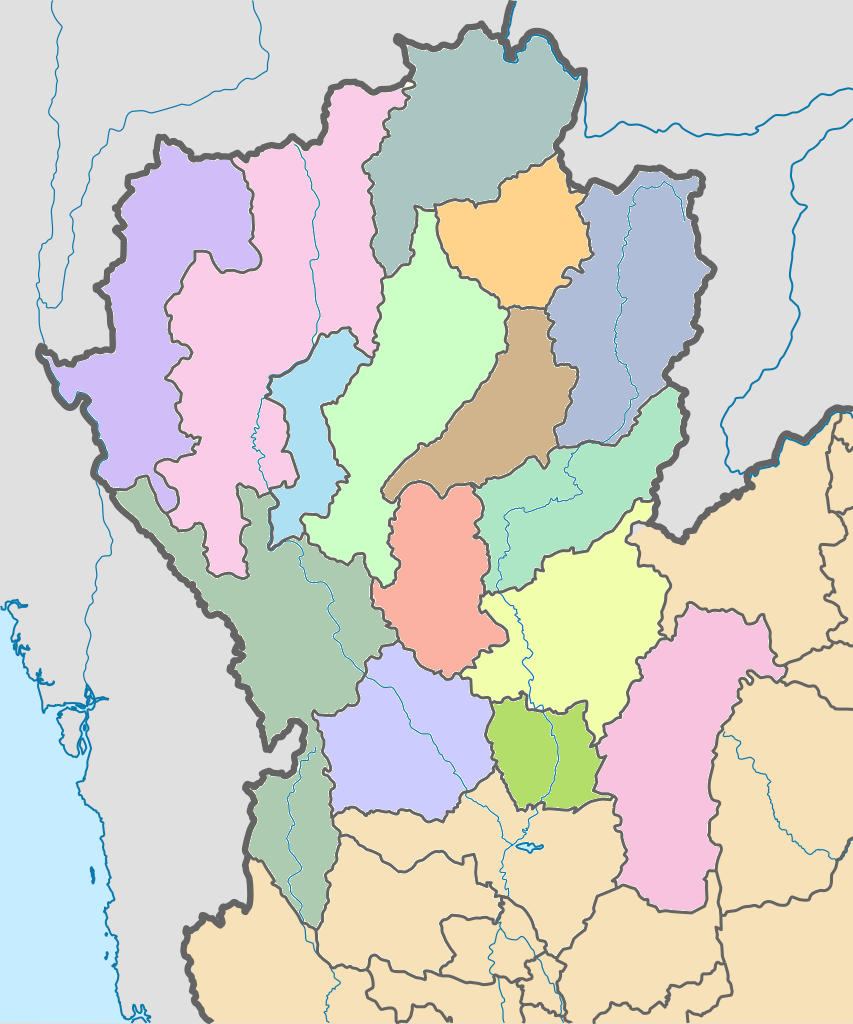
- Location within Thailand Northern TMD Location within Thailand
- Interactive map of Pang Ung
- Location: Mok Cham Pae, Mueang Mae Hong Son District, Mae Hong Son
- Coordinates: 19.498412°N 97.909188°E
- Type: Lake
- Primary inflows: Makhuea Som
- Basin countries: Thailand
- Surface elevation: 1,127 m (3,698 ft)

Pang Ung (Thai: ปางอุ๋ง, pronounced [pāːŋ ʔǔŋ]), also spelled Pang Oung, is a freshwater lake and tourist attraction in Mok Cham Pae, Mueang Mae Hong Son District, Mae Hong Son in northern Thailand.

Located in Mueang Mae Hong Son District, Mae Hong Son province. It is a project of H.M. King Bhumibol Adulyadej (Rama IX). The government restored the forests and ecosystems around the Patong and Fang Pang Ung reservoirs following years of encroachment on the area for deforestation.

Pang Ung is a reservoir surrounded by pine forests with a cool climate all year round, earning it the nickname "the Switzerland of Thailand". It is also often compared to Namiseom in South Korea, a popular filming location for many K-dramas, thanks to its similarly beautiful and romantic atmosphere. As a result, Pang Ung has become especially popular among young tourists.

Pang Ung is officially named "Pang Tong Royal Project Development II (Pang Ung)", which is a different place to Pang Ung Royal Project Development in neighbouring province Chiang Mai.

Its name Pang means "the lodging of the lumberjacks" and Ung is northern language refers to "lowland like a large basin with a lot of waterlogged" probably referring to the accommodation edge the reservoir.

== Attractions ==
Pang Ung has the area large reservoir on the high hill and is lined with pine trees. Tent camping as well as small cottages are available for use. Pang Ung situated in Ban Ruam Thai, Mok Champae, about 44 km (27.3 mi) from town of Mae Hong Son. The best time to visit is winter (November–December).

== See more ==
- Royal Project Foundation
