= Wat Phrathat Doi Kong Mu =

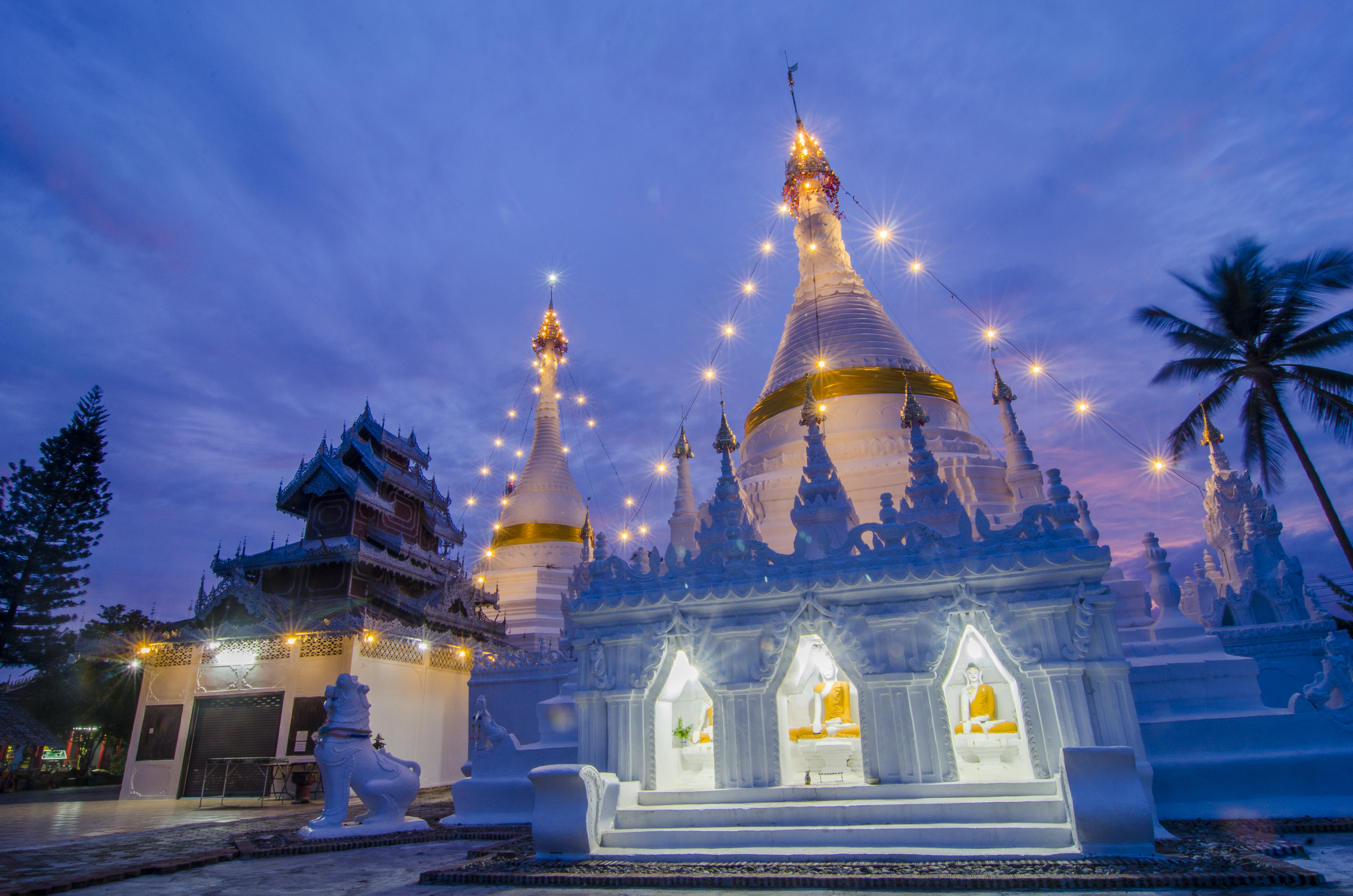
- The largest stūpa by dusk

- Location within Thailand

Religion
- Affiliation: Buddhism
- Sect: Theravāda
- Status: private temple

Location
- Location: Doi Kong Mu, Chong Kham, Mueang Mae Hong Son, Mae Hong Son province
- Country: Thailand
- Interactive map of Wat Phrathat Doi Kong Mu
- Coordinates: 19.3001°N 97.9601°E

Architecture
- Founder: Chong Tong Su, Phraya Singhanatracha
- Completed: 1872

Wat Phrathat Doi Kong Mu (Thai: วัดพระธาตุดอยกองมู) is an ancient Thai Buddhist temple in Mae Hong Son province, northern Thailand, considered as a provincial temple.

Formerly known as Wat Plai Doi (วัดปลายดอย, "temple on mountaintop"), because it is located on Doi Kong Mu hill 1,300 m (4,265 ft) above sea level, southern west of Amphoe Mueang Mae Hong Son. While the hill name Kong Mu is Shan language means "the stūpa". The monastery was built with Tai Yai architecture style mixed with Burmese style.

The most striking of the temple are two large whitewashed stūpas. The largest stūpa was built in 1860 by wealthy Tai Yai merchant named Chong Tong Su, it enshrines the relics of Maudgalyāyana, one of the chief disciples of the Lord Buddha. These relics were brought from Mawlamyine in Myanmar. While another stūpa next to it was built in 1872 by Phraya Singhanatracha who was a first governor of Mae Hong Son. This stūpa contains relics of Śāriputra that were brought from Mandalay.

The temple and the hill are also a scenic viewpoint of Mae Hong Son.

The temple was registered as an archaeological site of Mae Hong Son province by the Fine Arts Department in 1979.

== Gallery ==
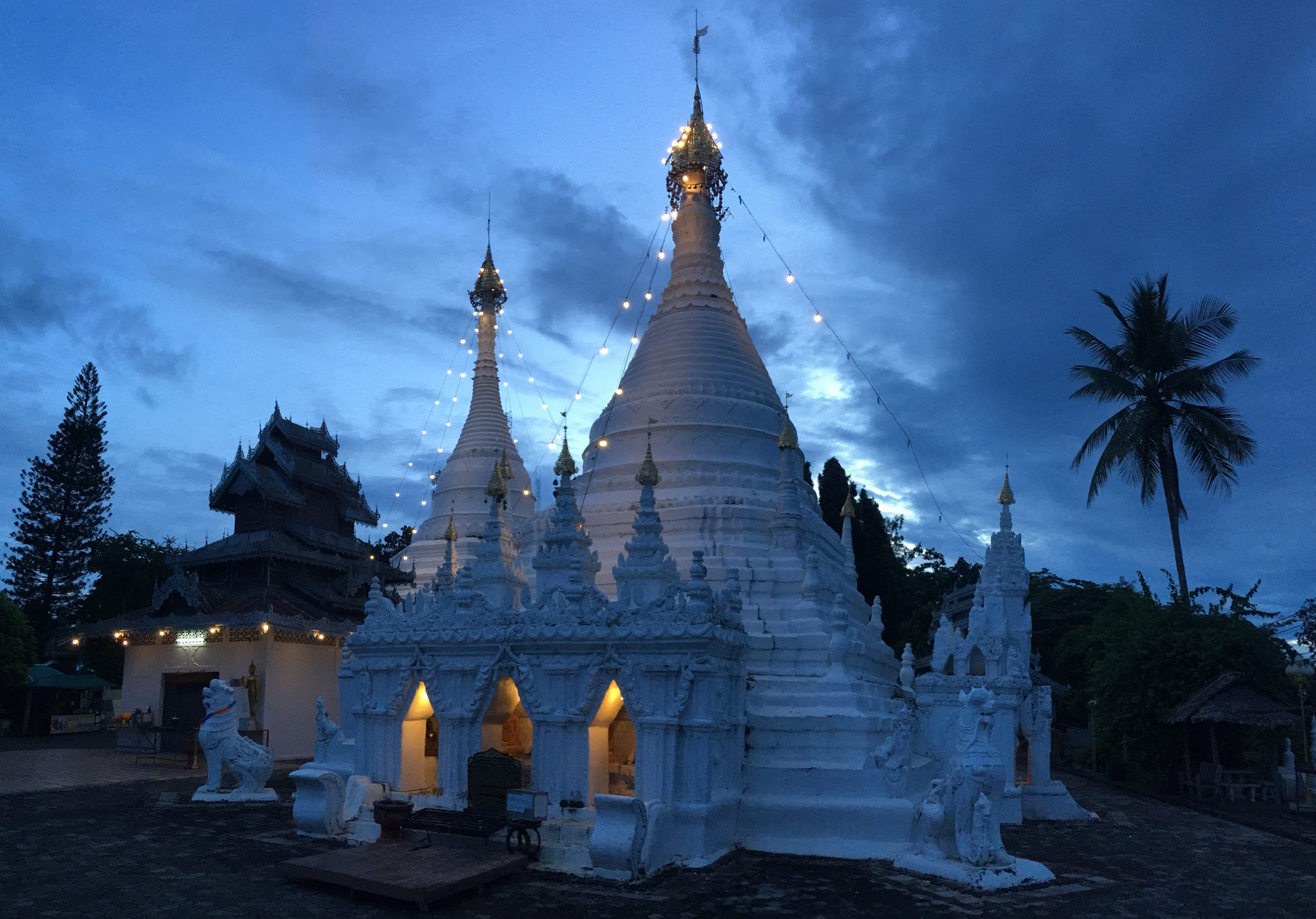
The temple in evening

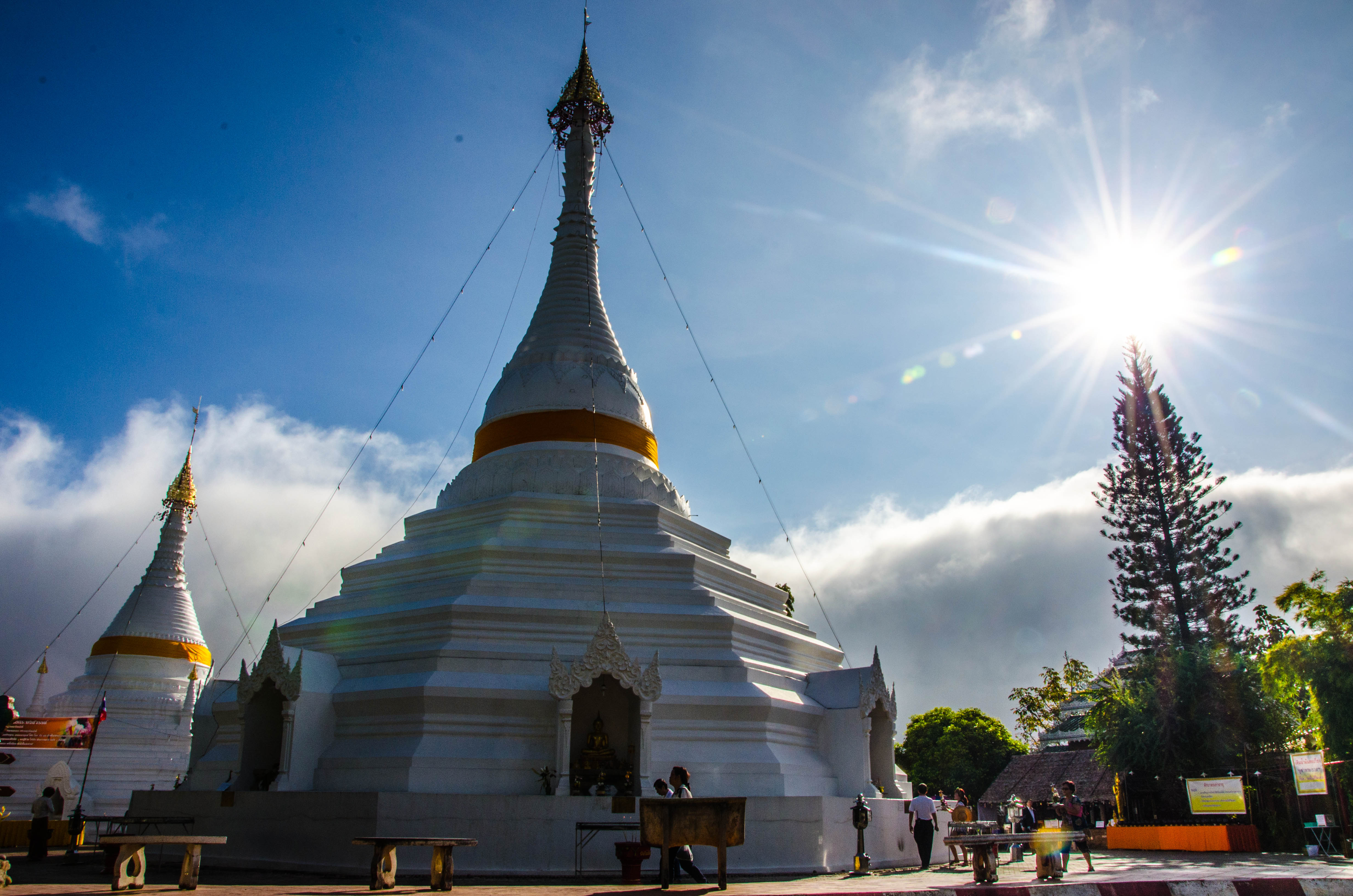
The largest stūpa in late morning

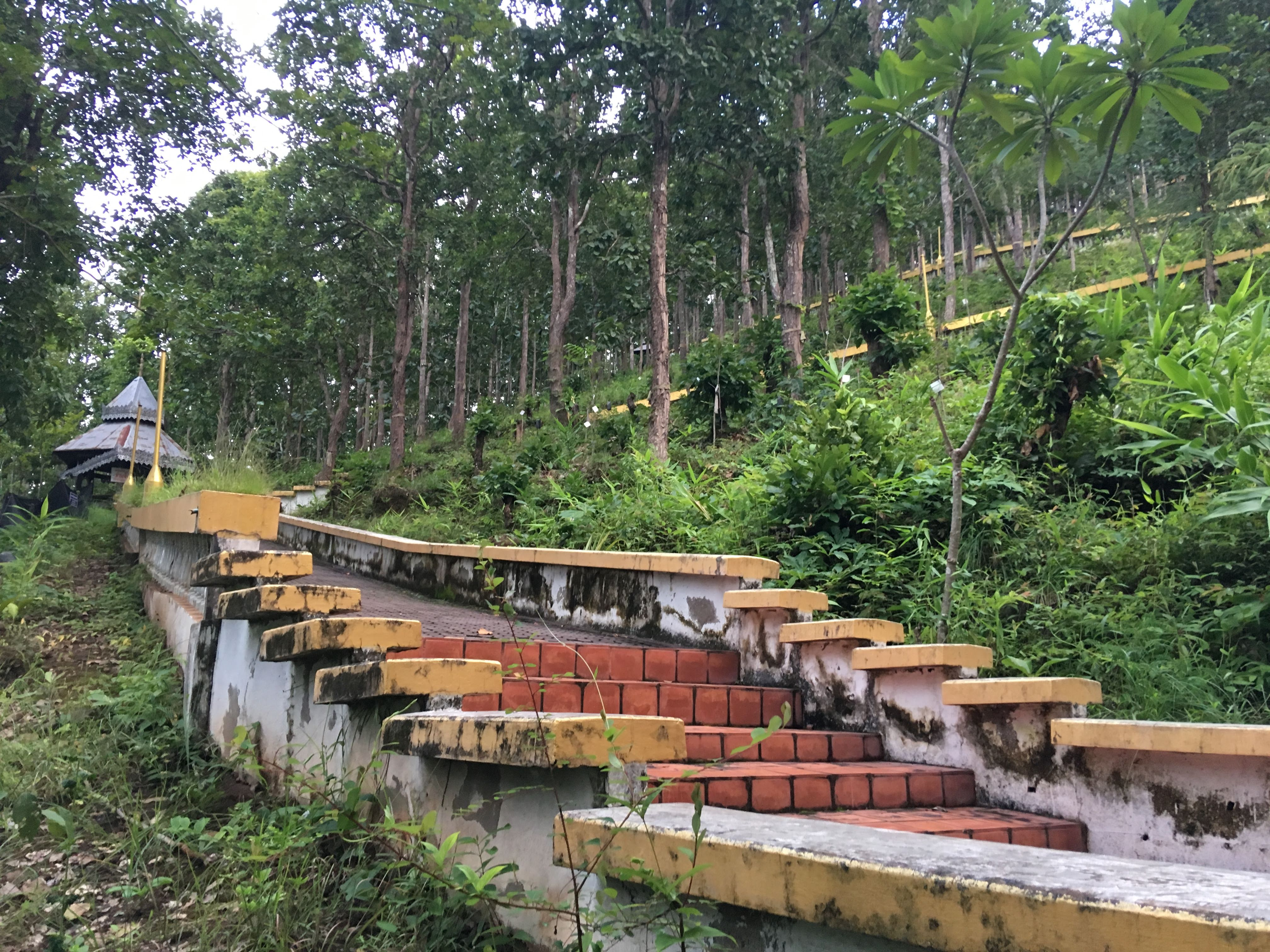
Stairs to the temple

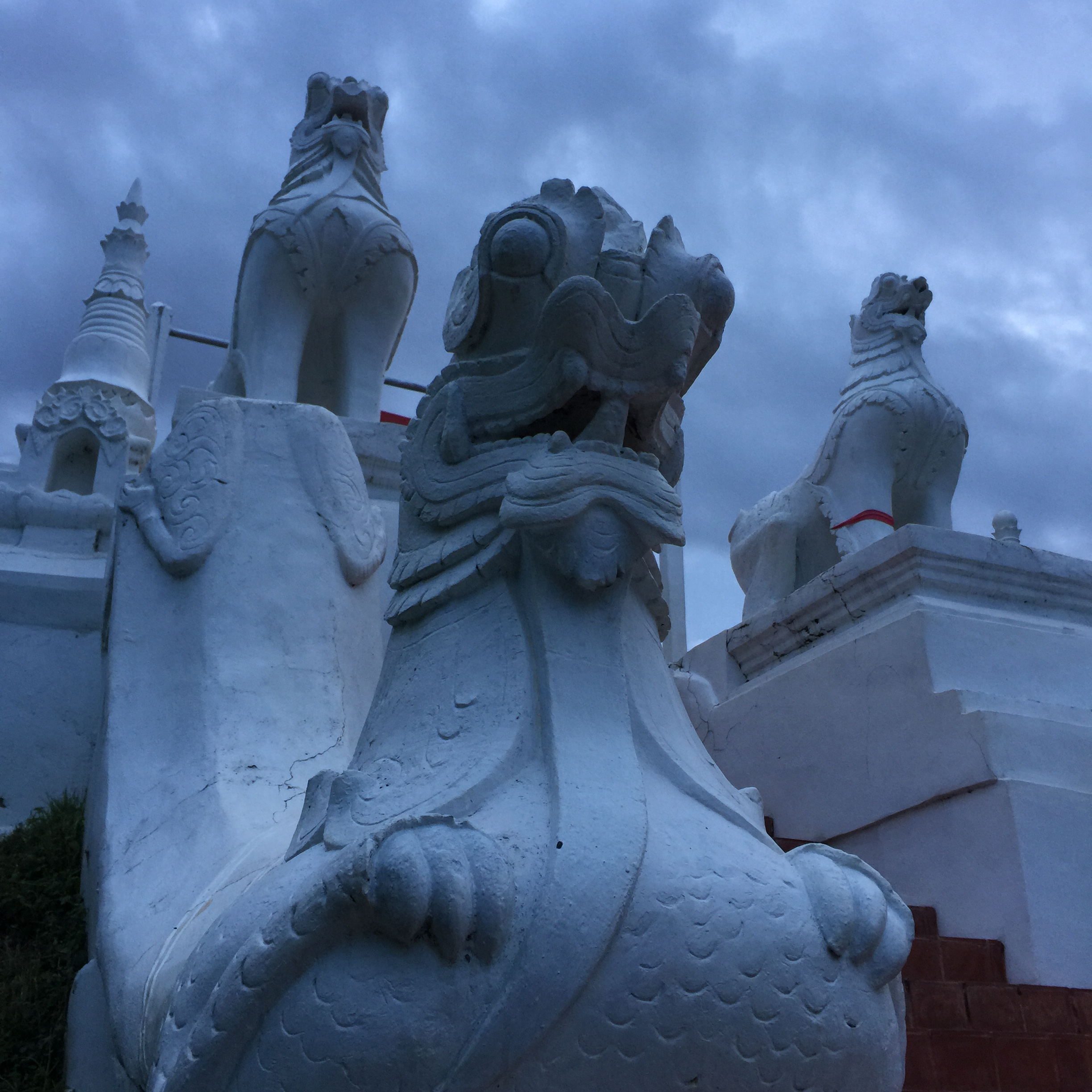
Sculptures of guarding lion

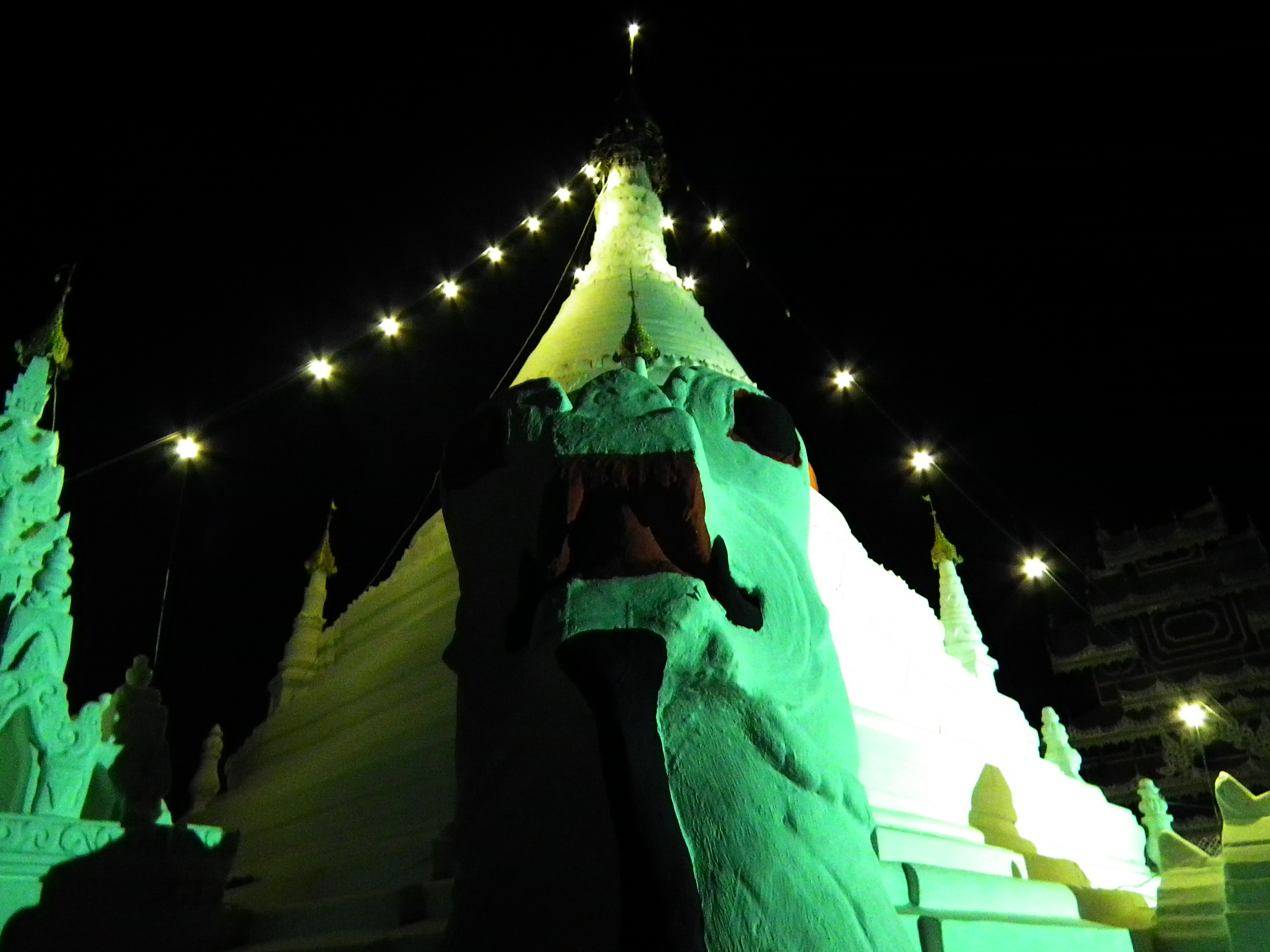
Guarding lion and largest stūpa in night

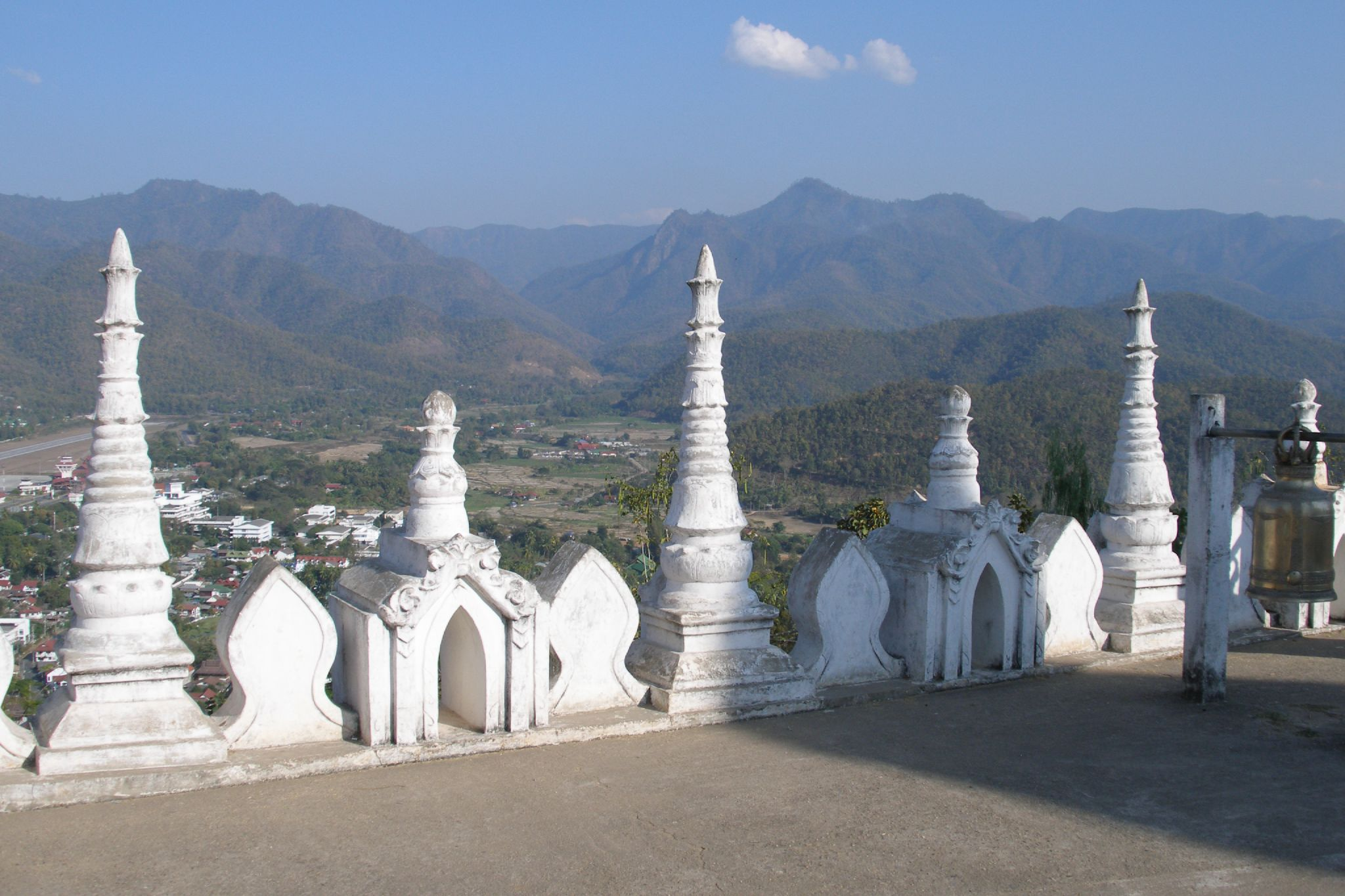
Doi Kong Mu gazing out to the town of Mae Hong Son, Daen Lao Range is a backdrop
