= Bo Sali =

Bo Sali บ่อสลี
- Tambon
- Interactive map of Bo Sali
- Coordinates: 18°08′46″N 98°15′50″E
- Country: Thailand
- Province: Chiang Mai
- Amphoe: Hot

Population (2019)
  - Total: 8,026
- Time zone: UTC+7 (TST)
- Postal code: 50240
- TIS 1099: 501605

Bo Sali (Thai: บ่อสลี) is a tambon (subdistrict) of Hot District, in Chiang Mai Province, Thailand. In 2019, it had a total population of 8,026 people.

== History ==
The subdistrict was created effective July 20, 1971 by splitting off 7 administrative villages from Bo Luang.

== Administration ==
=== Central administration ===
The tambon is subdivided into 10 administrative villages (muban).

No.	Name	Thai
1.	Ban Mae Tho	บ้านแม่โถ
2.	Ban Om Long	บ้านอมลอง
3.	Ban Mae Waen	บ้านแม่แวน
4.	Ban Kong Loi	บ้านกองลอย
5.	Ban Thung	บ้านทุ่ง
6.	Ban Bo Sali	บ้านบ่อสลี
7.	Ban Kong Pa	บ้านกองปะ
8.	Ban Mai Thung Son	บ้านใหม่ทุ่งสน
9.	Ban Mae Tho Luang	บ้านแม่โถหลวง
10.	Ban Dok Daeng	บ้านดอกแดง

=== Local administration ===
The whole area of the subdistrict is covered by the subdistrict administrative organization (SAO) Bo Sali (องค์การบริหารส่วนตำบลบ่อสลี).
