= Charoenchit Na Songkhla =

Thai politician (1930–2024)

- เจริญจิตต์ ณ สงขลา

Member of the Senate of Thailand
- In office 1992–1996

Member of the National Legislative Assembly of Thailand (1991)
- In office 1991–1992

Personal details
- Born: 8 November 1930 Mueang Songkhla district, Siam
- Died: 12 October 2024 (aged 93) Mueang Mae Hong Son district, Thailand
- Party: Independent
- Education: Thammasat University; National Defence College of Thailand
- Occupation: Civil servant

Charoenchit Na Songkhla (Thai: เจริญจิตต์ ณ สงขลา; 8 November 1930 – 12 October 2024) was a Thai civil servant and politician. An independent, served in the National Legislative Assembly from 1991 to 1992 and was a senator from 1992 to 1996.

Na Songkhla died in the Mueang Mae Hong Son district on 12 October 2024, at the age of 93.
