= Pornpet Muensri =

Pornpet Muensri (Note: Other spellings include Meuansri) (Thai: พรเพชร เหมือนศรี) was a Thai land rights activist.

Pornpet led a four decade campaign to protect the land she had grown up on in Nong Bua District of Nakhon Sawan Province from government expropriation, including leading a 400-day protest sleeping on the streets of Bangkok, riding a water buffalo around the office of the Prime Minister, and nearly self-immolated.

== Death and legacy ==
Pornpet was killed on 31 May 2004 by an unknown assailant in Nong Bua District.

Pornpet was featured in "My 'W/ri[gh]t/E' and My Land: A Postcolonial Feminist Study on Grassroots' Archives and Autobiography" by Thai author Sinith Sittirak, a book focusing on land rights issues in Nakhon Sawan Province. Sinith founder the Thai Grassroots Women's Archive and Research (TGWAR) to preserve Pornpet's records and life work.

Pornpet is the subject of the forthcoming "The Story of Pornpet Muensri" by British photographer Luke Duggleby and Thai journalist Nicha Wachpanich.
