= Ban Tan =

Ban Tan may refer to:

- Ban Tan Subdistrict in Bamnet Narong District, Chaiyaphum, Thailand
- Ban Tan, Chiang Mai, a subdistrict in Hot District, Chiang Mai, Thailand
