= Gussing Renewable Energy =

Thai renewable energy company

Gussing Renewable Energy Asia is a renewable Energy company headquartered in Bangkok, Thailand. Gussing Renewable Energy provides the planning, design, construction, operation, and sale of customized CO_{2}-neutral solutions for MultiFunctional EnergySystems (MFES) from renewable energy, with an Integrated Resources Management (IRM).

== Overview ==
It's Renewable Energy Model was developed in the Austrian town of Güssing and they have started their initial development in Thailand. And the Dual Fluidized Bed (DFB) gasification technology has been developed at the Vienna University of Technology. Gussing Renewable owns and operates renewable energy plants in Newport Beach, California(USA), Gussing(Austria), Bangkok(Thailand). The company has also partnered with GP Energy to open a plant in Kolkata(India), with Edison Power to open plant in Tokyo(Japan).

In the 1990s there was a policy demanding renewable energy in town Gussing. Vienna's Technical University built a pilot project in Gussing applying the technology, where wood chips are gasified under high temperature conditions. There are 27 decentralized power plants within the Güssing county. Güssing has an “energy” turnover of about €14 Million p.a.

The carbon-neutral waste gasification plant built by Gussing Renewable Energy (GRE) in Nong Bua District supplies power to the area, turning agricultural and forest waste from the local community to energy that could power about 3,000 homes.
