= Hotbox =

Hotbox or hot box may refer to:

== Food processing ==
- Hot Box (appliance), an improvised appliance to heat up food, usually with incandescent light bulbs as the heat source
- an enclosure used for beef aging

== Sports ==
- Hot box (game), a half-court flying disc sport with a very small box-shaped scoring area
- Hotbox (baseball), also known as the rundown, is a running/fielding/throwing drill in baseball training

== Arts and media ==
- Hotbox (TV series), a Canadian sketch comedy show named for the marijuana/hash smoking practice
- The Hot Box, a 1972 women in prison film
- "Hotbox" (song), a 2025 song by Lil Nas X
- "Hot Box" a song by JID from DiCaprio 2
- "Hotbox", a song by Laganja Estranja
- The Hot Box, a fictional nightclub from the musical Guys and Dolls

== Other uses ==
- Box (torture), also called a hot box, a form of torture and penal punishment by imprisoning a person in an overheated room, cell or cage
- Hot box (rail), an overheated journal box on a railroad car
- A hotbox, a pressure washer accessory, powered by oil, gas or electricity, used to heat water before it is sprayed from the washer
- a hotbed (gardening) that is enclosed in a box with a glass or clear plastic lid
- Hotboxing, smoking marijuana or hashish in a small enclosed area, causing it to fill with smoke in order to maximize the effect

== See also ==
- Hot (disambiguation)
- Hotness (disambiguation)
- Box (disambiguation)
- Boxing (disambiguation)
- Hotboxin' with Mike Tyson, a podcast
- Cool box
- ColdBox Platform
- Cryogenic gas plant § Coldbox
