= Mae Hong Son Airport =

Airport in northern Thailand

Mae Hong Son Airport ท่าอากาศยานแม่ฮ่องสอน
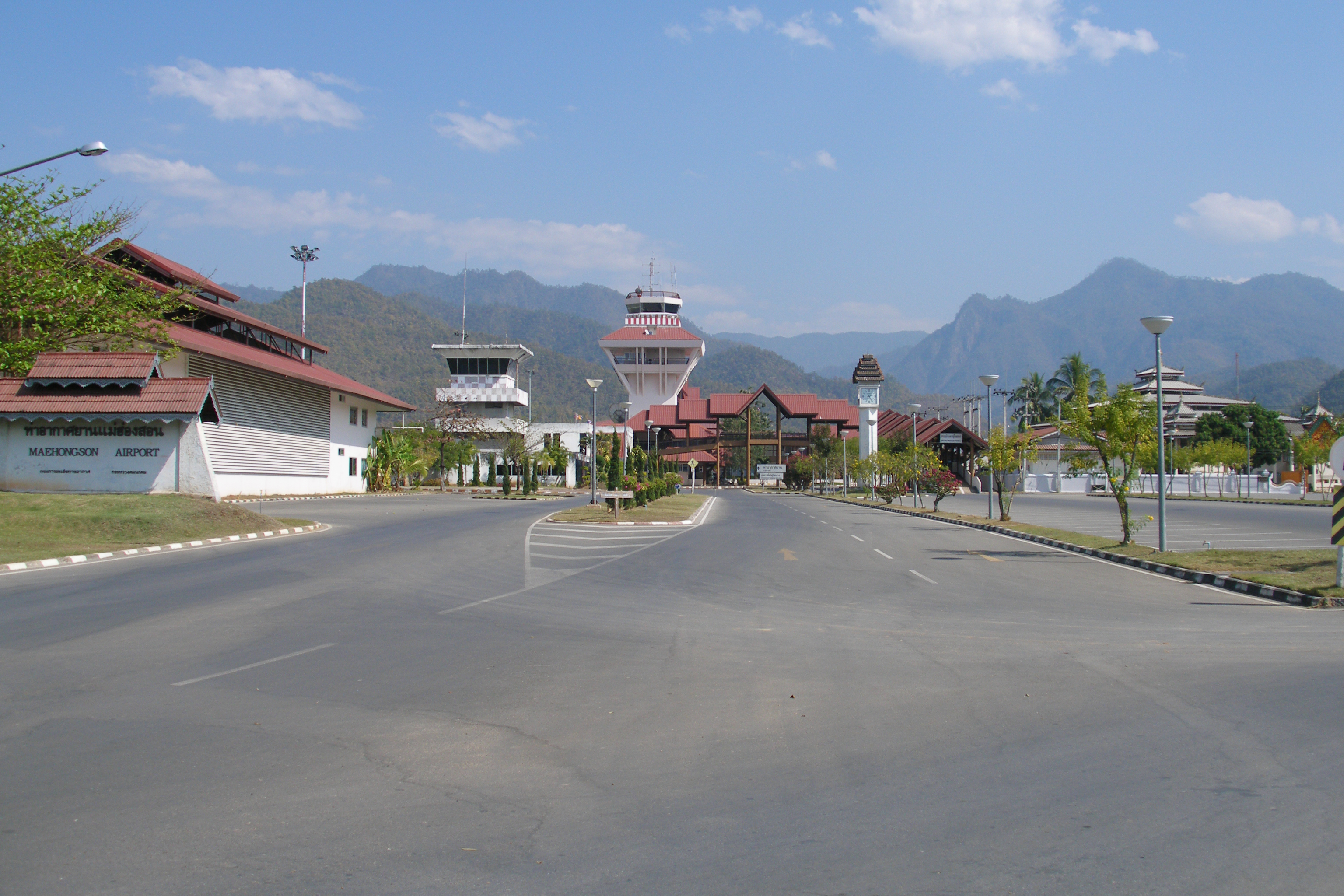
- Mae Hong Son airport
- IATA: HGN; ICAO: VTCH

Summary
- Airport type: Public
- Operator: Department of Airports
- Serves: Mae Hong Son
- Location: Tambon Chong Kham, Amphoe Mueang Mae Hong Son, Mae Hong Son, Thailand
- Opened: 1939; 87 years ago
- Elevation AMSL: 283 m / 929 ft
- Coordinates: 19°18′4″N 97°58′29″E

Maps
- Location of airport in Thailand
- Interactive map of Mae Hong Son Airport

Runways
Direction	Length		Surface
Direction	m	ft	Surface
11/29	2,000	6,562	Asphalt

Statistics (2025)
- Passengers: 6,084 ▼55.39%
- Aircraft movements: 170 ▼65.44%
- Freight (tonnes): -
- Sources: Department of Airports

Mae Hong Son Airport (IATA: HGN, ICAO: VTCH) is in Tambon Chong Kham, Amphoe Mueang Mae Hong Son, Mae Hong Son province in Northern Thailand. It has two main buildings, one each for departing and arriving guests. It contains a convenience store, coffee shop, restaurant, souvenir shop, ATM, as well as a parking garage.
