= HOTS =

Hots may refer to having "the hots for a person", or physical attraction. HOTS or H.O.T.S. may also refer to:

== Education ==
- "Harvard Of The South": see Southern Ivy

== Film, literature, music ==
- H.O.T.S., a 1979 sex comedy film
- The House of the Spirits, a 1982 novel
  - The House of the Spirits (film), a 1993 film adaptation of the novel
- Hope of the States, an English indie rock group
- Heart of the Sunrise, a song by English progressive rock band Yes

== Games ==
- StarCraft II: Heart of the Swarm, a 2013 video game
- Heroes of the Storm, a 2015 multiplayer video game
- Age of the Tempest, a 2013 role-playing game formerly known as Heroes of the Storm

== See also ==
- Hot (disambiguation)
- HOTAS, an acronym for 'hands on throttle and stick'
- Higher-order thinking, also called higher order thinking skills
