= Pha Bong =

Coordinates: 19.2266°N 97.9707°E

Pha Bong ผาบ่อง
- Subdistrict
- Interactive map of Pha Bong
- Country: Thailand
- Province: Mae Hong Son
- District: Mueang Mae Hong Son

Population (2005)
  - Total: 9,874
- Time zone: UTC+7 (ICT)

Pha Bong (Thai: ผาบ่อง) is a village and tambon (subdistrict) of Mueang Mae Hong Son District, in Mae Hong Son Province, Thailand. In 2005 it had a population of 9,874 people. The tambon contains 13 villages.

Pha Bong is known for its annual Poy Sang Long Festival, when young boys are ordained to become sang long (novice monks).
