= Hang Dong, Hot =

Hang Dong หางดง
- Tambon
- Interactive map of Hang Dong
- Coordinates: 18°41′N 98°55′E
- Country: Thailand
- Province: Chiang Mai
- Amphoe: Hot

Population (2022)
  - Total: 4,550
- Time zone: UTC+7 (TST)
- Postal code: 50240
- TIS 1099: 501601

Hang Dong (Thai: หางดง) is a tambon (subdistrict) of Hot District, in Chiang Mai Province, Thailand. In 2022 it had a total population of 4,550 people.

== Administration ==
=== Central administration ===
The tambon is subdivided into 13 administrative villages (muban).

No.	Name	Thai	Population
1.	Ban Mae Long	บ้านแม่ลอง	109
2.	Ban Tha Kham	บ้านท่าข้าม	
3.	Ban Hang Dong	บ้านหางดง	793
4.	Ban Pha Taen	บ้านผาแตน	584
5.	Ban Mae Tang	บ้านแม่ทัง	870
6.	Ban Kong Hin	บ้านกองหิน	
7.	Ban Khong Ngam	บ้านโค้งงาม	1,003
8.	Ban Doi Kham	บ้านดอยคำ	848
9.	Ban Huai Som Poi	บ้านห้วยส้มป่อย	0
10.	Ban Wang Lung Mai	บ้านวังลุงใหม่	0
11.	Ban Tha Hin	บ้านท่าหิน	343
12.	Ban Pong	บ้านโป่ง	
13.	Ban Lang Kat	บ้านหลังกาด	

=== Local administration ===
The area of the subdistrict is shared by 2 local governments.

- the subdistrict municipality (Thesaban Tambon) Tha Kham (เทศบาลตำบลท่าข้าม)
- the subdistrict administrative organization (SAO) Hang Dong (องค์การบริหารส่วนตำบลหางดง)
