= Na Kho Ruea =

Na Kho Ruea นาคอเรือ
- Tambon
- Interactive map of Na Kho Ruea
- Country: Thailand
- Province: Chiang Mai
- Amphoe: Hot

Population (2019)
  - Total: 4,792
- Time zone: UTC+7 (TST)
- Postal code: 50240
- TIS 1099: 501606

Na Kho Ruea (Thai: นาคอเรือ) is a tambon (subdistrict) of Hot District, in Chiang Mai Province, Thailand. In 2019 it had a total population of 4,792 people.

== History ==
The subdistrict was created effective August 27, 1976 by splitting off 6 administrative villages from Ban Aen.

== Administration ==
=== Central administration ===
The tambon is subdivided into 10 administrative villages (muban).

No.	Name	Thai
1.	Ban Lang Tho	บ้านหลังท่อ
2.	Ban Na Kho Ruea	บ้านนาคอเรือ
3.	Ban Huai Hin Kham	บ้านห้วยหินดำ
4.	Ban Huai Fang	บ้านห้วยฝาง
5.	Ban Mae Pa Phai	บ้านแม่ป่าไผ่
6.	Ban Mae Ngut	บ้านแม่งูด
7.	Ban Den	บ้านเด่น
8.	Ban Tin Tok	บ้านตีนตก
9.	Ban Mae Lai Duang Chan	บ้านแม่ลายดวงจันทร์
10.	Ban Mai Yung Thong	บ้านใหม่ยูงทอง

=== Local administration ===
The whole area of the subdistrict is covered by the subdistrict administrative organization (SAO) Na Kho Ruea (องค์การบริหารส่วนตำบลนาคอเรือ).
