= Pang Mu =

Coordinates: 19.3336°N 97.9656°E

Pang Mu ปางหมู
- Subdistrict
- Interactive map of Pang Mu
- Country: Thailand
- Province: Mae Hong Son
- District: Mueang Mae Hong Son

Population (2005)
  - Total: 15,577
- Time zone: UTC+7 (ICT)

Pang Mu (Thai: ปางหมู) is a village and tambon (sub-district) of Mueang Mae Hong Son District, in Mae Hong Son Province, Thailand. In 2005 it had a population of 15,577 people. The tambon contains 14 villages.
