= Huai Pha =

Huai Pha ห้วยผา
- Subdistrict
- Country: Thailand
- Province: Mae Hong Son
- District: Mueang Mae Hong Son

Population (2005)
  - Total: 6,249
- Time zone: UTC+7 (ICT)

Huai Pha (Thai: ห้วยผา) is a village and tambon (sub-district) of Mueang Mae Hong Son District, in Mae Hong Son Province, Thailand. In 2005, it had a population of 6,249 people. The tambon contains nine villages.
