= Huai Pu Ling =

Huai Pu Ling ห้วยปูลิง
- Subdistrict
- Country: Thailand
- Province: Mae Hong Son
- District: Mueang Mae Hong Son

Population (2005)
  - Total: 3,332
- Time zone: UTC+7 (ICT)

Huai Pu Ling (Thai: ห้วยปูลิง) is a village and tambon (sub-district) of Mueang Mae Hong Son District, in Mae Hong Son Province, Thailand. In 2005, it had a population of 3,332 people. The tambon contains 11 villages.
