= Hotness =

Hotness may refer to:

- High temperature
- A slang term for sexual attractiveness
- Pungency, the spiciness or piquancy of food, such as of hot peppers
  - The Scoville scale, a numerical scale for expressing the degree of pungency
- Audio mixed with a bias toward louder sound

== See also ==
- Hot (disambiguation)
