= Huai Pong =

Huai Pong ห้วยโป่ง
- Subdistrict
- Country: Thailand
- Province: Mae Hong Son
- District: Mueang Mae Hong Son

Population (2005)
  - Total: 7,056
- Time zone: UTC+7 (ICT)

Huai Pong (Thai: ห้วยโป่ง) is a village and tambon (sub-district) of Mueang Mae Hong Son District, in Mae Hong Son Province, Thailand. In 2005, it had a population of 7,056 people. The tambon contains 15 villages.
