= Dong Charoen district =

Dong Charoen ดงเจริญ
- District
- District location in Phichit province
- Coordinates: 16°1′42″N 100°37′36″E
- Country: Thailand
- Province: Phichit
- Seat: Wang Ngio Tai

Area
  - Total: 220.3 km^{2} (85.1 sq mi)

Population (2007)
  - Total: 18,214
  - Density: 82.7/km^{2} (214/sq mi)
- Time zone: UTC+7 (ICT)
- Postal code: 66210
- Geocode: 6611

Dong Charoen (Thai: ดงเจริญ, pronounced [dōŋ t͡ɕā.rɤ̄ːn]) is a district (amphoe) in the southeastern part of Phichit province, central Thailand.

== Geography ==
Neighboring districts are (from the west clockwise) Bang Mun Nak and Thap Khlo of Phichit Province, Chon Daen of Phetchabun province and Nong Bua of Nakhon Sawan province.

== History ==
The minor district (king amphoe) was established on 15 July 1996 by splitting off five tambons from Bang Mun Nak district.

The Thai government on 15 May 2007 upgraded all 81 minor districts to full districts. On 24 August the upgrade became official.

== Administration ==
The district is divided into five sub-districts (tambons), which are further subdivided into 54 villages (mubans). The township (thesaban tambon) Samnak Khun Nen covers parts of tambon Samnak Khun Nen. There are a further five tambon administrative organizations (TAO).

No.	Name	Thai name	Villages	Pop.
1.	Wang Ngio Tai	วังงิ้วใต้	9	3,511
2.	Wang Ngio	วังงิ้ว	11	3,797
3.	Huai Ruam	ห้วยร่วม	12	3,325
4.	Huai Phuk	ห้วยพุก	11	3,993
5.	Samnak Khun Nen	สำนักขุนเณร	11	5,789
