= Bo Luang =

Bo Luang บ่อหลวง
- Tambon
- Interactive map of Bo Luang
- Coordinates: 18.2833°N 98.6333°E
- Country: Thailand
- Province: Chiang Mai
- Amphoe: Hot

Population (2019)
  - Total: 12,143
- Time zone: UTC+7 (TST)
- Postal code: 50240
- TIS 1099: 501604

Bo Luang (Thai: บ่อหลวง) is a tambon (subdistrict) of Hot District, in Chiang Mai Province, Thailand. In 2019, it had a total population of 12,143 people.

== Administration ==
=== Central administration ===
The tambon is subdivided into 13 administrative villages (muban).

No.	Name	Thai
1.	Ban Bo Luang	บ้านบ่อหลวง
2.	Ban Wang Kong	บ้านวังกอง
3.	Ban Khun	บ้านขุน
4.	Ban Na Fon	บ้านนาฟ่อน
5.	Ban Mae Lai Nuea	บ้านแม่ลายเหนือ
6.	Ban Mae Lai Tai	บ้านแม่ลายใต้
7.	Ban Phui	บ้านพุย
8.	Ban Kio Lom	บ้านกิ่วลม
9.	Ban Mae Sanam	บ้านแม่สะนาม
10.	Ban Tian Ang	บ้านเตียนอาง
11.	Ban Bo Sa-ngae	บ้านบ่อสะแง๋
12.	Ban Bo Phawaen	บ้านบ่อพะแวน
13.	Ban Mae Huet	บ้านแม่หืด

=== Local administration ===
The whole area of the subdistrict is covered by the subdistrict municipality (Thesaban Tambon) Bo Luang (เทศบาลตำบลบ่อหลวง).
