= Hot FM =

Hot FM may refer to a number of radio stations:

- Hot FM (Australian radio network), in Queensland and Western Australia, owned by Southern Cross Austereo and Prime Television
- Hot FM network, in the United Kingdom, formerly owned by Chiltern Radio Group
- Hot FM (Malaysia), in Malaysia, owned by Media Prima
- Hot FM (Philippines), a defunct radio network in the Philippines owned by MBC Media Group
- Hot 100 FM in Darwin, Northern Territory, Australia
- One FM 91.3, previously known as HOT FM 91.3, in Singapore, owned by SPH Media Trust
- WKHL (FM), known as Hot 92.1, in Harrisburg, Pennsylvania, USA, owned by Cumulus Broadcasting
- KBCQ-FM, known as Hot 97, in New Mexico, USA, owned by Roswell Radio
- WQHT-FM, known as Hot 97, in New York City, USA, owned by Emmis Communications
- WHZT, known as The New Hot 98-1, in Greenville/Spartanburg, South Carolina, USA, owned by Cox Media Group
- WIHT, known as Hot 99.5, in Washington D.C., USA, owned by iHeartMedia
- KHQT, known as Hot 103, in Las Cruces, New Mexico, USA, owned by Richardson Commercial Corporation
- KKLS-FM, known as Hot 104.7, in Sioux Falls, South Dakota, USA, owned by Cumulus Media
- WHQT, known as Hot 105 FM, in South Florida, USA, owned by Cox Radio
- CJNW-FM, known as Hot 107, in Edmonton, Alberta, Canada, owned by John Charles Yerxa
- WUHT known as Hot 107.7, in Birmingham, Alabama, USA, owned by UAB Blazers Radio Network
- KHXT, known as Hot 107.9, in Erath, Louisiana, USA, owned by Regent Communications
- WJFX, known as Hot 107.9, in Fort Wayne, Indiana, USA, owned by Oasis Radio Group
- Hot 1027, known as Hot 1027, in Johannesburg, South Africa, owned by Indigo House Group Holdings
