= Hua Ngom =

Coordinates: 19.5354°N 99.7776°E

Hua Ngom หัวง้ม
- Tambon
- Interactive map of Hua Ngom
- Country: Thailand
- Province: Chiang Rai
- District: Phan

Population (2005)
  - Total: 7,141
- Time zone: UTC+7 (ICT)

Hua Ngom (Thai: หัวง้ม) is a village and tambon (subdistrict) of Phan District, in Chiang Rai Province, Thailand. In 2005, it had a population of 7,141 people. The tambon contains 13 villages.
