= Mok Champae =

Mok Champae หมอกจำแป่
- Subdistrict
- Interactive map of Mok Champae
- Coordinates: 19°26′5″N 97°57′54″E
- Country: Thailand
- Province: Mae Hong Son
- District: Mueang Mae Hong Son

Population (2010)
  - Total: 6,936
- Time zone: UTC+7 (ICT)
- Postal code: 58000
- Geocode: 580105

Mok Champae (Thai: หมอกจำแป่) is a village and tambon (sub-district) of Mueang Mae Hong Son District, in Mae Hong Son Province, Thailand. In 2010 it had a population of 6,936 people (compared to 7,271 people in 2005).

== Administration ==
Since 1997 the sub-district has had a tambon administrative organization (TAO). The sub-district is divided into nine administrative villages.

No.	Name	Thai
1.	Ban Mok Champae	บ้านหมอกจำแป่
2.	Ban Mae Sa-nga	บ้านแม่สะงา
3.	Ban Huai Khan	บ้านห้วยขาน
4.	Ban Nu Pa Paek	บ้านนาป่าแปก
5.	Ban Huai Makhueasom	บ้านห้วยมะเขือส้ม
6.	Ban Rak Thai	บ้านรักไทย
7.	Ban Huai Pong On	บ้านห้วยโป่งอ่อน
8.	Ban Thotsok	บ้านทบศอก
9.	Ban Yot	บ้านยอด
