= Hot Hot Hot (disambiguation) =

"Hot Hot Hot" is a 1983 song by Arrow.

Hot Hot Hot may also refer to:

- "Hot, Hot, Hot" (LL Cool J song), 1998
- "Hot Hot Hot!!!", a 1987 song by The Cure
- "Hot Hot Hot / Mirrors", a 2019 single by Tohoshinki
- Hot Hot Hot (film), a 2011 Luxembourg-Austrian-Belgian film
- Hot Hot Hot (meme), a 2005 viral video
