= Ban Tan, Chiang Mai =

Ban Tan บ้านตาล
- Tambon
- Interactive map of Ban Tan
- Country: Thailand
- Province: Chiang Mai
- Amphoe: Hot

Population (2019)
  - Total: 5,100
- Time zone: UTC+7 (TST)
- Postal code: 50240
- TIS 1099: 501603

Ban Tan (Thai: บ้านตาล) is a tambon (subdistrict) of Hot District, in Chiang Mai Province, Thailand. In 2019, it had a total population of 5,100 people.

== Administration ==
=== Central administration ===
The tambon is subdivided into 10 administrative villages (muban).

No.	Name	Thai
1.	Ban Tan Nuea	บ้านตาลเหนือ
2.	Ban Pa Kham	บ้านป่าขาม
3.	Ban Tan Tai	บ้านตาลใต้
4.	Ban Thung Pong	บ้านทุ่งโป่ง
5.	Ban Tan Klang	บ้านตาลกลาง
6.	Ban Den Saraphi	บ้านเด่นสารภี
7.	Ban Mae Yui	บ้านแม่ยุย
8.	Ban Tha Nong Luang	บ้านท่าหนองหลวง
9.	Ban Chang Khoeng	บ้านช่างเคิ่ง
10.	Ban Mai Phatthana	บ้านใหม่พัฒนา

=== Local administration ===
The whole area of the subdistrict is covered by the subdistrict municipality (Thesaban Tambon) Ban Tan (เทศบาลตำบลบ้านตาล).
