= Hot subdistrict =

Hot ฮอด
- Tambon
- Interactive map of Hot
- Coordinates: 18°12′N 98°37′E
- Country: Thailand
- Province: Chiang Mai
- Amphoe: Hot

Population (2019)
  - Total: 3,170
- Time zone: UTC+7 (TST)
- Postal code: 50240
- TIS 1099: 501602

Hot (Thai: ฮอด) is a tambon (subdistrict) of Hot District, in Chiang Mai Province, Thailand. In 2019, it had a total population of 3,170 people.

== Administration ==
=== Central administration ===
The tambon is subdivided into 5 administrative villages (muban).

No.	Name	Thai
1.	Ban Khwae Makok	บ้านแควมะกอก
2.	Ban Phae Din Daeng	บ้านแพะดินแดง
3.	Ban Wang Lung	บ้านวังลุง
4.	Ban Huai Sai	บ้านห้วยทราย
5.	Ban Dong Dam	บ้านดงดำ

=== Local administration ===
The whole area of the subdistrict is covered by the subdistrict administrative organization (SAO) Hot (องค์การบริหารส่วนตำบลฮอด).
