= Tha Kham, Chiang Mai =

Hot ฮอด
- Subdistrict Municipality
- Tha Kham
- Location of Tha Kham within Thailand
- Coordinates: 18°11′33″N 98°36′39″E
- Country: Thailand
- Province: Chiang Mai Province

Government
  - Type: Subdistrict municipality

Area
  - Total: 6 km^{2} (2.3 sq mi)

Population
  - Total: 6,087
  - Density: 1,015/km^{2} (2,630/sq mi)
- Time zone: UTC+7 (Thailand)
- Website: http://www.ttkhod.org

Tha Kham is a subdistrict municipality (thesaban tambon) in Hot District in the south of Chiang Mai Province, Thailand. It covers the district centre and headquarters, and the town is also referred to as Hot.
