= Chong Kham =

Chong Kham จองคำ
- Subdistrict
- Country: Thailand
- Province: Mae Hong Son
- District: Mueang Mae Hong Son

Population (2005)
  - Total: 6,440
- Time zone: UTC+7 (ICT)

Chong Kham (Thai: จองคำ) is a village and tambon (sub-district) of Mueang Mae Hong Son District, in Mae Hong Son Province, Thailand. In 2005, it had a population of 6,440 people. The tambon contains two villages.
