= Hot district =

Hot ฮอด
- District
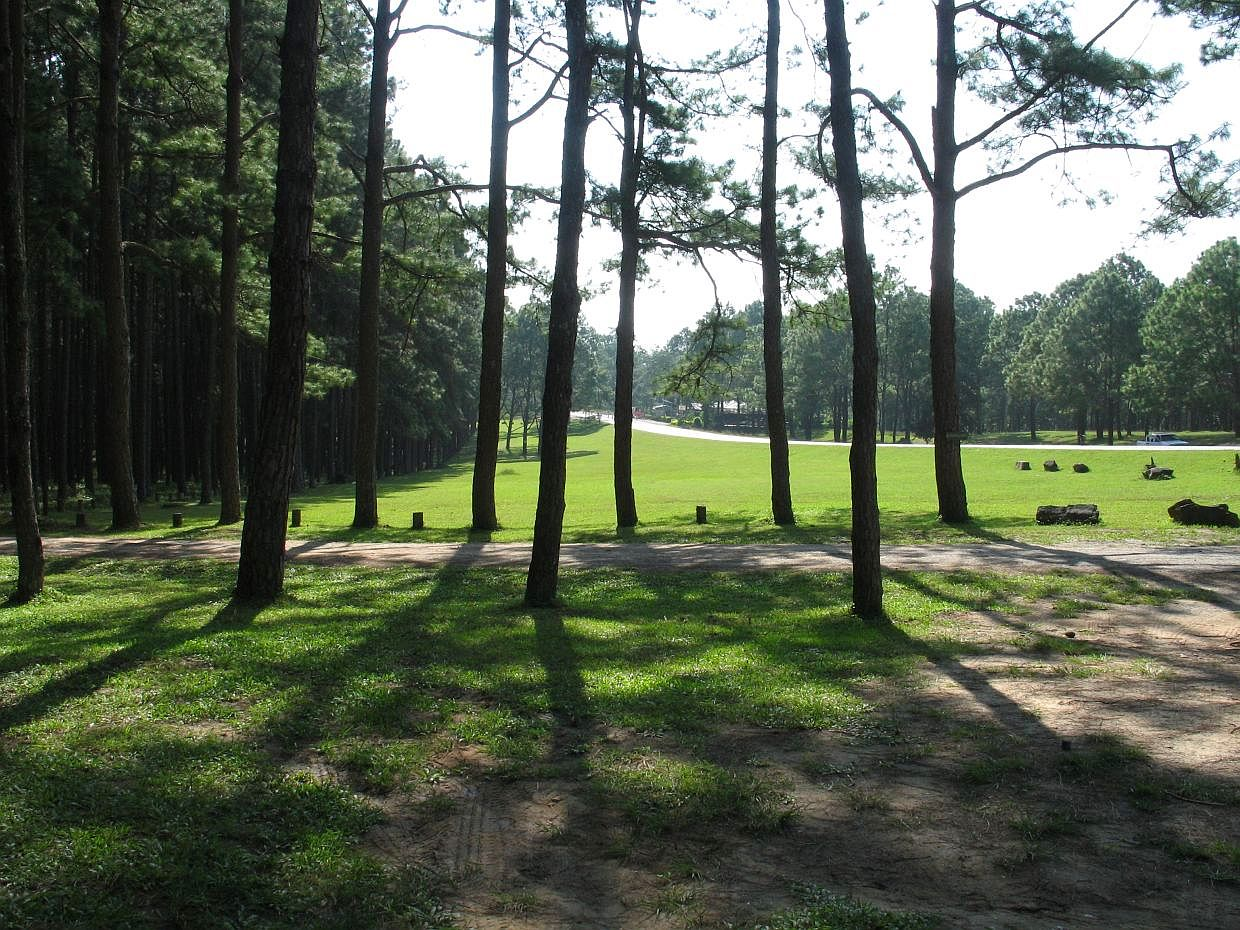
- Pine forests along Route 108

- District location in Chiang Mai province
- Coordinates: 18°11′34″N 98°36′40″E
- Country: Thailand
- Province: Chiang Mai

Area
  - Total: 1,430.38 km^{2} (552.27 sq mi)

Population (2005)
  - Total: 48,287
  - Density: 33.8/km^{2} (88/sq mi)
- Time zone: UTC+7 (ICT)
- Postal code: 50240
- Geocode: 5016

Hot (Thai: ฮอด, pronounced [hɔ̂ːt]) is a district (amphoe) in the southern part of Chiang Mai province in northern Thailand.

== Geography ==
Neighboring districts are (from the north clockwise) Mae Chaem, Chom Thong of Chiang Mai Province, Ban Hong, Li of Lamphun province, Doi Tao, Omkoi of Chiang Mai Province, Sop Moei and Mae Sariang of Mae Hong Son province.

== History ==
In 1905 the district Muet Ka was abolished and split into the district Mueang Hot and the minor district Mueang Hot. In 1917 the district was renamed Hot.

== Administration ==
The district is divided into six sub-districts (tambon), which are further subdivided into 60 villages (muban). There are two sub-district municipalities (thesaban tambon), Tha Kham and Hang Dong, both covering parts of tambon Hang Dong. There are a further six tambon administrative organizations (TAO).

No.	Name	Thai name	Villages	Pop.
1.	Hang Dong	หางดง	13	15,303
2.	Hot	ฮอด	5	3,307
3.	Ban Tan	บ้านตาล	10	5,242
4.	Bo Luang	บ่อหลวง	12	11,958
5.	Bo Sali	บ่อสลี	10	7,926
6.	Na Kho Ruea	นาคอเรือ	10	4,551

== Tourism ==
Notable tourist sites in Hot include:

- Bo Kaeo Pine Tree Garden
- Doi Bo Luang Forest
- Mae Tho National Park
- Op Luang National Park
- Pha Wing Shu
- Pha Singh Leaw

== Gallery ==
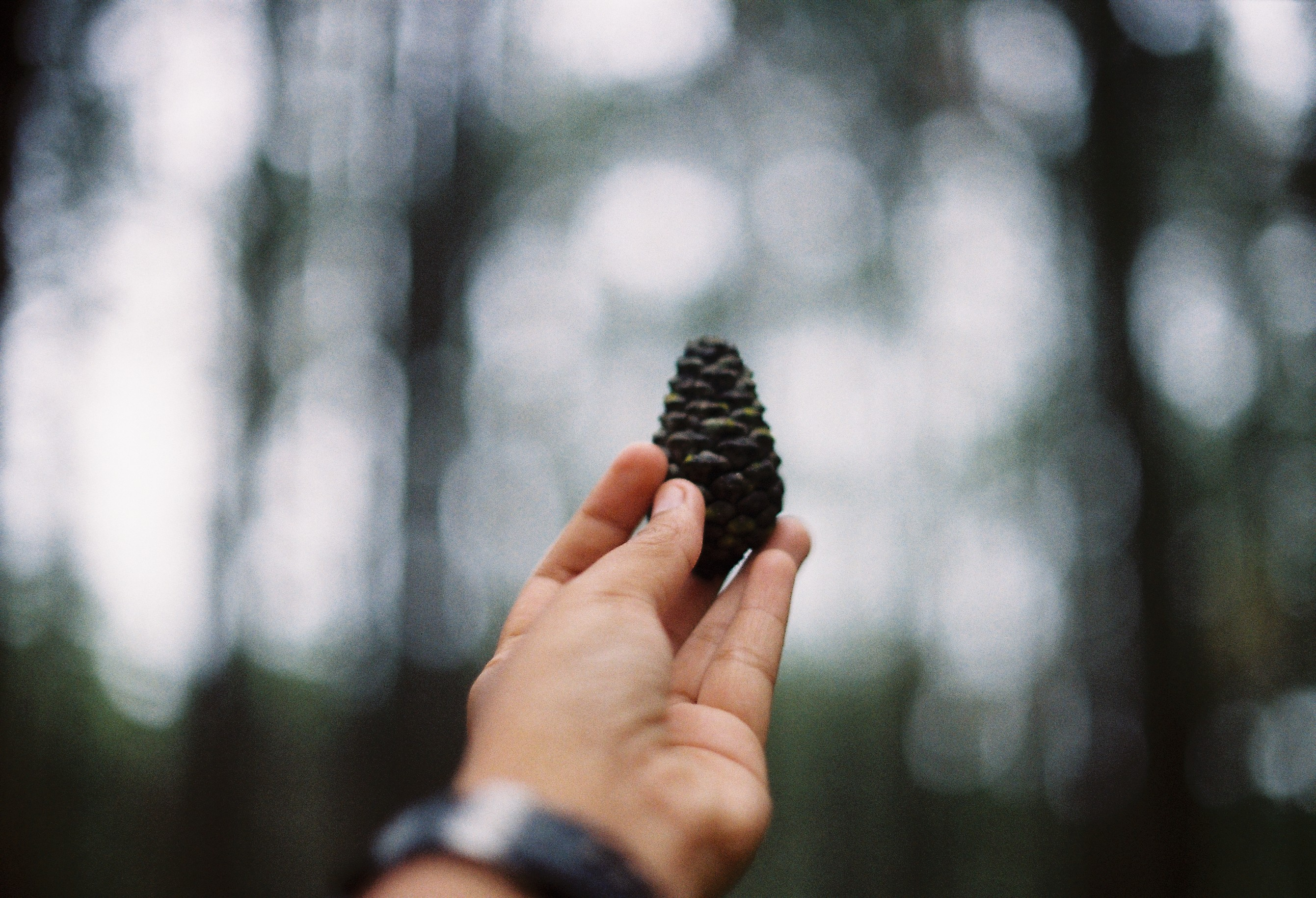
Pine forests of Hot
