= Nong Bua district =

Nong Bua หนองบัว
- District
- District location in Nakhon Sawan province
- Coordinates: 15°51′54″N 100°35′10″E
- Country: Thailand
- Province: Nakhon Sawan

Area
  - Total: 819.5 km^{2} (316.4 sq mi)

Population (2005)
  - Total: 70,609
  - Density: 86.16/km^{2} (223.2/sq mi)
- Time zone: UTC+7 (ICT)
- Postal code: 60110
- Geocode: 6004

Nong Bua (Thai: หนองบัว, pronounced [nɔ̌ːŋ būa̯]) is a district (amphoe) in the northeastern part of Nakhon Sawan province, central Thailand. This place can be considered as the heart of Nong Bua Lamphu Province. Only the name of the province can depict the image of it as the city of swamps (Nong). Swamps are the province's symbolic place which absolutely has fascinating scenery. Only the name of the province can make everyone imagine what the province looks like.

== History ==
The government separated some tambons of Chum Saeng district, Tha Tako district, and Bang Mun Nak district of Phichit province to create the minor district (king amphoe) Nong Bua on 1 January 1948. It was upgraded to a full district on 6 June 1956.

== Geography ==
Neighboring districts are (from the north clockwise): Bang Mun Nak and Dong Charoen of Phichit province; Chon Daen and Bueng Sam Phan of Phetchabun province; and Phaisali, Tha Tako, and Chum Saeng of Nakhon Sawan Province.

== Administration ==
The district is divided into nine sub-districts (tambons), which are further subdivided into 105 villages (mubans). Nong Bua is a township (thesaban tambon) covering parts of tambons Nong Bua and Nong Klap. There are a further nine tambon administrative organizations (TAO).

No.	Name	Thai name	Villages	Pop.
1.	Nong Bua	หนองบัว	20	15,342
2.	Nong Klap	หนองกลับ	15	13,103
3.	Than Thahan	ธารทหาร	9	7,977
4.	Huai Ruam	ห้วยร่วม	11	4,595
5.	Huai Thua Tai	ห้วยถั่วใต้	7	2,178
6.	Huai Thua Nuea	ห้วยถั่วเหนือ	9	3,580
7.	Huai Yai	ห้วยใหญ่	6	2,938
8.	Thung Thong	ทุ่งทอง	14	9,876
9.	Wang Bo	วังบ่อ	14	11,020
