= Mueang Mae Hong Son district =

Mueang Mae Hong Son เมืองแม่ฮ่องสอน
- District
- District location in Mae Hong Son province
- Coordinates: 19°18′14″N 97°58′38″E
- Country: Thailand
- Province: Mae Hong Son
- Seat: Chong Kham

Area
  - Total: 2,484 km^{2} (959 sq mi)

Population (2019)
  - Total: 63,179
  - Density: 22.2/km^{2} (57/sq mi)
- Time zone: UTC+7 (ICT)
- Postal code: 58000
- Geocode: 5801

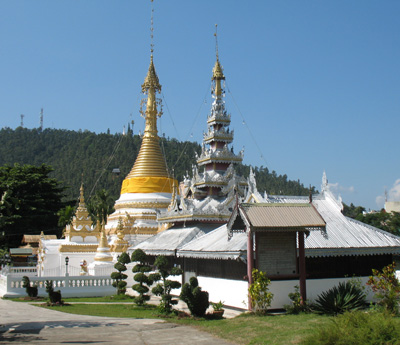
Wat Phra That Chong Kham

Mueang Mae Hong Son (Thai: เมืองแม่ฮ่องสอน, pronounced [mɯ̄a̯ŋ mɛ̂ː hɔ̂ŋ sɔ̌ːn]) is the capital district (amphoe mueang) of Mae Hong Son province, northern Thailand.

== History ==
The Interior Ministry upgraded Mueang Mae Hong Son to a fourth-class city under Monthon Phayap on 10 May 1910. It then consisted of the four districts, Mueang Mae Hong Son, Mueang Yuam (now Mae Sariang District), Pai, and Khun Yuam.

In 1917, the district was renamed from Mueang to Muai To (ม่วยต่อ). In 1938 it was renamed Mueang Mae Hong Son. The northeastern part of the district was split off in 1987 and formed the new district Pang Mapha.

== Geography ==
The Daen Lao Range dominates the landscape of this district. Neighboring districts are (from south clockwise): Khun Yuam of Mae Hong Son Province; Kayah State of Myanmar; Pang Mapha and Pai of Mae Hong Son Province; and Galyani Vadhana and Mae Chaem of Chiang Mai province.

The Namtok Mae Surin National Park office is in the district.

== Administration ==
The district is divided into seven sub-districts (tambons), which are further subdivided into 70 villages (mubans). Mae Hong Son itself is a town (thesaban mueang) which covers tambon Chong Kham. Each of the other six tambons is administered by a tambon administrative organization (TAO).

No.	Name	Thai	Villages	Pop.
1.	Chong Kham	จองคำ	-	6,534
2.	Huai Pong	ห้วยโป่ง	15	6,948
3.	Pha Bong	ผาบ่อง	12	9,519
4.	Pang Mu	ปางหมู	13	14,725
5.	Mok Champae	หมอกจำแป่	9	6,936
6.	Huai Pha	ห้วยผา	8	5,431
9.	Huai Pu Ling	ห้วยปูลิง	11	3,240

Missing numbers are tambons which now form Pang Mapha District.
