= Phitsanulok provincial and local government =

Phitsanulok provincial and local government are the administrative bodies for Phitsanulok province (Thai: พิษณุโลก, Thai pronunciation: [pʰít.sā.nú.lôːk]), one of Thailand's seventy-six provinces, which lies in lower northern Thailand, with a population of 865,247 (2019 census). The provincial capital is the city of Phitsanulok, where the main government offices are situated. The province is mainly rural in nature, with 68.2% of inhabitants living in the countryside, with only 31.8% in small towns and cities, most of which have populations of less than 15,000. Agriculture is the most important sector of the economy, contributing 28% of GPP and employing 42% of the labour force, with sugar cane, rice, cassava and maize being the main crops, alongside a wide variety of fruit and vegetables. Tourism and hospitality, unlike in coastal provinces, play only a limited role, generating a mere 1% of provincial GPP.

== Phitsanulok provincial government ==
Phitsanulok province, with a registered population as of 31 December 2019 of 865,247 is led by a governor and is divided into 9 districts (amphoe). Each district is led by a districts chief (nai amphoe). Governor, district chiefs and district clerks are appointed by the central government. There are 93 subdistricts (tambon) each led by a subdistrict chief (kamnan), further divided into 1,050 villages (muban) each led by a village chief (phu yai ban). Subdistrict chiefs and village chiefs are elected by local citizens.

Districts map Phitsanulok province		Name	Thai
	1	Mueang Phitsanulok	เมืองพิษณโลก
	2	Nakhon Thai	นครไทย
	3	Chat Trakan	ชาติตระการ
	4	Bang Rakam	บางระกำ
	5	Bang Krathum	บางกระทุ่ม
	6	Phrom Phiram	พรหมพืราม
	7	Wat Bot	วัดโบสถ์
	8	Wang Thong	วังทอง
	9	Noen Maprang	เนินมะปราง

=== Population ===
The total population of Phitsanulok province is 865,247, of which Mueang Phitsanulok district is the most densely populated district with 291,311 people. Wang Thong district also has a population of more than 100,000 people. The remaining seven districts have a population of 35,000 to 95,000, of which Wat Bot district is the less densely populated district with 37,694 people.

Population 2019 census
	District	Population		Area			Population density	
	District	Data	Proportion	km^{2}	mile^{2}	Proportion	per km^{2}	per mile^{2}
1	Mueang	291,311	33.7%	750.8	289.9	7.0%	388	1,005
2	Wang Thong	121,047	14.0%	1,687.1	651.4	15.6%	72	186
3	Bang Rakam	94,643	10.9%	936.0	361.4	8.6%	101	262
4	Nakhon Thai	87,772	10.1%	2,220.4	857.3	20.5%	40	102
5	Phrom Phiram	86,103	10.0%	832.7	321.5	7.7%	103	268
6	Noen Maprang	57,972	6.7%	1,029.6	397.5	9.5%	56	146
7	Bang Krathum	47,359	5.5%	447.0	172.6	4.1%	106	274
8	Chat Trakan	41,346	4.8%	1,586.1	612.4	14.7%	26	68
9	Wat Bot	37,694	4.3%	1,326.2	512.0	12.3%	28	74
	Total	865,247	100.0%	10,815.9	4,176.0	100.0%	80	207

Population density of Phitsanulok province is 80 people per square kilometer (207 people per sq.mi.), of which Mueang Phitsanulok district has the highest density with 388 people per square kilometer (1,005 people per sq.mi.) and Chat Trakan district the lowest density with 26 people per square kilometer (68 people per sq.mi.)

=== Revenue taxes ===
The total personal income tax, corporate income tax, value added tax (VAT), specific duties, stamp duties and others for Phitsanulok province amounts to 1,440.7 million baht (US$46.4 million) for fiscal year 2019.
Mueang Phitsanulok District has the largest share of the revenue taxes (82%) with 1,186.7 million baht (US$38.3 million).
The remaining eight districts have the smallest share of the revenue taxes (18%) with 254 million baht (US$8.1 million).

Revenue taxes per million baht
District	Total	Personal income tax	Corporate income tax	Value added tax	Specific duties	Stamp duties	Others
Mueang Phitsanulok	1,186.7	360.1	288.0	508.2	11.7	16.8	1.9
Nakhon Thai	20.3	8.8	4.7	6.2	-	0.5	0.1
Chat Trakan	10.2	3.8	1.9	4.2	-	0.3	-
Bang Rakam	80.7	16.7	23.1	37.6	0.2	2.8	0.3
Bang Krathum	26.1	8.6	8.6	8.4	0.1	0.3	0.1
Phrom Phiram	32.1	8.8	8.1	14.3	-	0.7	0.2
Wat Bot	11.8	5.9	1.9	3.4	-	0.5	0.1
Wang Thong	63.3	15.0	13.1	33.3	-	1.7	0.2
Noen Maprang	9.5	4.0	1.5	3.7	-	0.3	-
Total	1,440.7	431.7	350.9	619.3	12.0	23.9	2.9

=== Mueang Phitsanulok district ===
	Subdistrict	Population	Villages
1	Nai Mueang	60,108	-
2	Aranyik	29,116	10
3	Hua Ro	26,537	12
4	Bueng Phra	19,010	10
5	Samo Khae	16,017	10
6	Tha Pho	15,875	11
7	Tha Thong	14,388	11
8	Don Thong	13,425	14
9	Ban Krang	13,394	12
10	Ban Khlong	13,303	5

	Subdistrict	Population	Villages
11	Wat Chan	9,642	6
12	Wat Phrik	8,678	12
13	Phlai Chumphon	8,142	5
14	Ban Pa	5,779	10
15	Makham Sung	5,702	10
16	Pak Thok	4,992	7
17	Chom Thong	4,047	9
18	Wang Nam Khu	4,046	8
19	Phai Kho Don	4,042	6
20	Ngio Ngam	3,531	7
	Total population	279,774	175

=== Nakhon Thai district ===
	Subdistrict	Population	Villages
1	Nong Kathao	15,930	27
2	Noen Phoem	12,312	19
3	Ban Yaeng	10,091	13
4	Nakhon Thai	8,591	13
5	Na Bua	7,701	15
6	Huai Hia	7,056	10

	Subdistrict	Population	Villages
7	Bo Pho	6,765	13
8	Ban Phrao	6,016	10
9	Yang Klon	4,768	10
10	Nakhon Chum	2,903	8
11	Nam Kum	2,358	7
	Total population	84,491	145

=== Chat Trakan district ===
	Subdistrict	Population	Villages
1	Bo Phak	9,998	16
2	Ban Dong	8,250	16
3	Pa Daeng	8,084	12

	Subdistrict	Population	Villages
4	Suan Miang	5,650	10
5	Tha Sakae	4,963	9
6	Chat Trakan	4,605	9
	Total population	41,550	72

=== Bang Rakam district ===
	Subdistrict	Population	Villages
1	Bang Rakam	16,799	19
2	Nong Kula	14,229	22
3	Bueng Kok	9,157	12
4	Nikhom Phatthana	7,930	13
5	Plak Raet	7,784	10
6	Chum Saeng Songkhram	7,562	11

	Subdistrict	Population	Villages
7	Khui Muang	6,966	12
8	Phan Sao	5,941	11
9	Tha Nang Ngam	5,734	11
10	Wang Ithok	4,389	11
11	Bo Thong	4,305	10
	Total population	90,796	142

=== Bang Krathum district ===
	Subdistrict	Population	Villages
1	Noen Kum	7,241	11
2	Tha Tan	6,572	9
3	Bang Krathum	6,253	9
4	Nakhon Pa Mak	6,196	13
5	Phai Lom	4,486	11

	Subdistrict	Population	Villages
6	Ban Rai	4,264	10
7	Wat Ta Yom	4,120	9
8	Khok Salut	3,024	10
9	Sanam Khli	2,376	6
	Total population	44,532	88

=== Phrom Phiram district ===
	Subdistrict	Population	Villages
1	Phrom Phiram	13,653	15
2	Wong Khong	9,317	11
3	Tha Chang	8,764	13
4	Matong	8,529	12
5	Dong Prakham	8,272	11
6	Si Phirom	7,100	13

	Subdistrict	Population	Villages
7	Thap Yai Chiang	5,371	6
8	Nong Khaem	5,328	10
9	Ho Klong	4,589	7
10	Taluk Thiam	4,525	9
11	Matum	3,911	6
12	Wang Won	3,308	10
	Total population	82,667	123

=== Wat Bot district ===
	Subdistrict	Population	Villages
1	Wat Bot	7,639	10
2	Thothae	6,352	8
3	Ban Yang	6,280	11

	Subdistrict	Population	Villages
4	Tha Ngam	6,264	13
5	Khan Chong	5,553	10
6	Hin Lat	4,545	9
	Total population	36,633	61

=== Wang Thong district ===
	Subdistrict	Population	Villages
1	Ban Klang	20,074	27
2	Wang Thong	17,974	15
3	Wang Nok Aen	16,271	20
4	Kaeng Sopha	10,445	13
5	Phan Chali	9,347	17
6	Wang Phikun	9,035	15

	Subdistrict	Population	Villages
7	Tha Muen Ram	7,773	14
8	Mae Raka	6,908	15
9	Nong Phra	6,672	12
10	Din Thong	6,409	11
11	Chaiyanam	6,190	9
	Total population	117,098	168

=== Noen Maprang district ===
	Subdistrict	Population	Villages
1	Chomphu	12,888	15
2	Sai Yoi	8,201	17
3	Noen Maprang	8,012	9
4	Ban Noi Sum Khilek	7,717	12

	Subdistrict	Population	Villages
5	Wang Phrong	6,865	9
6	Ban Mung	6,810	8
7	Wang Yang	5,590	7
	Total population	56,083	77

== Phitsanulok local government ==
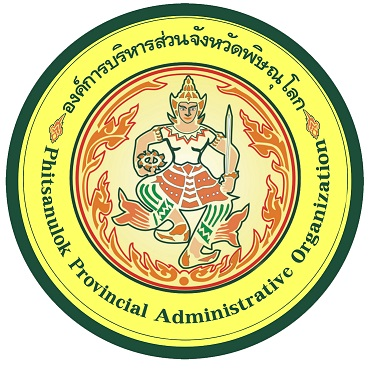
Phitsanulok PAO

As of 26 November 2019, there are: one Phitsanulok Provincial Administrative Organisation - PPAO (Thai: องค์การบริหารส่วนจังหวัดพิษณุโลก, romanized: ongkan borihan suan changwat phitsanulok - abbreviated อบจ. พิษณุโลก, o bo cho phitsanulok) and 26 municipal (thesaban) areas in the province. Phitsanulok has city (thesaban nakhon) status, Aranyik has town (thesaban mueang) status and 24 subdistrict municipalities (thesaban tambon). The non-municipal areas are administered by 76 Subdistrict Administrative Organisations - SAO (ongkan borihan suan tambon).
All mayors, chiefs and councillors are directly elected by the local citizens. Municipalities have communities (chumchon), although not directly chosen by the local citizens, which provides advice and recommendations to local administrative organisations. They also promote and support community participation and enterprises at the district level and subdistrict villages.

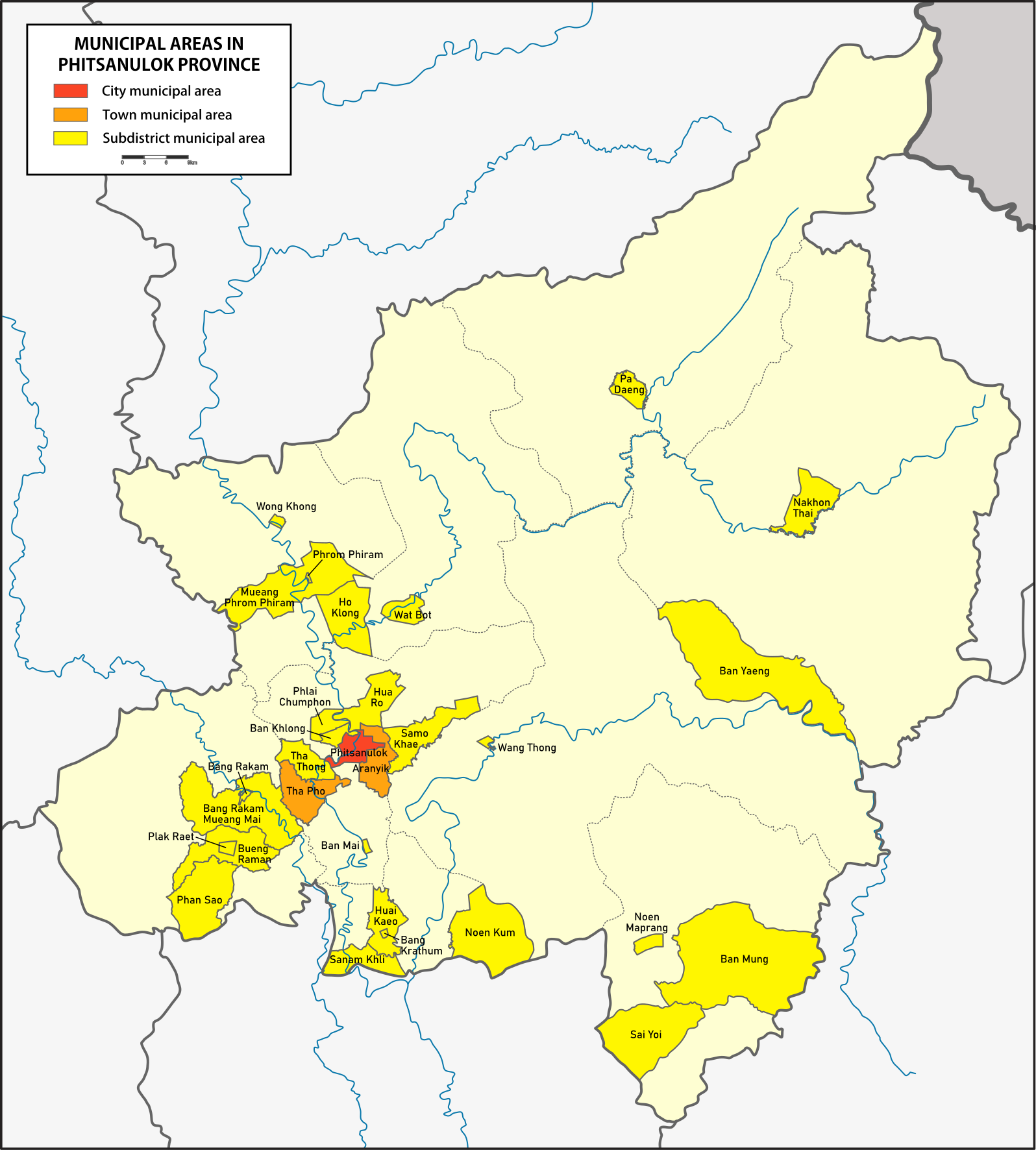

=== Urban areas ===
Urban population in Phitsanulok province is 274,802 (31.8%) There is one urban area with more than 150,000 inhabitants: centered around the city of Phitsanulok. An urban area around Bang Rakam has more than 30,000 people. There are also seven urban areas with 7,000 to 13,000 people. Furthermore, there are six urban areas with less than 5,500 people, of which Phrom Phiram is the smallest with about 1,100 people.

	Urban area	District	Municipality	People
1	Phitsanulok	Mueang	Phitsanulok city	66,106
		Mueang	Aranyik town	30,508
		Mueang	Hua Ro	24,902
		Mueang	Tha Thong	13,993
		Mueang	Ban Khlong	13,562
		Mueang	Phlai Chumphon	7,476
			Total	156,547
2	Bang Rakam	Bang Rakam	Bang Rakam M.M.	14,649
		Bang Rakam	Phan Sao	6,143
		Bang Rakam	Bueng Raman	4,390
		Bang Rakam	Bang Rakam	4,337
		Bang Rakam	Plak Raet	3,636
			Total	33,155
3	Noen Kum	Bang Krathum	Noen Kum	12,773

	Urban area	District	Municipality	People
4	Ban Yaeng	Nakhon Thai	Ban Yaeng	10,235
5	Nakhon Thai	Nakhon Thai	Nakhon Thai	9,278
6	Bang Krathum	Bang Krathum	Huai Kaeo	5,332
		Bang Krathum	Sanam Khli	2,496
		Bang Krathum	Bang Krathum	1,417
			Total	9,245
7	Sai Yoi	Noen Maprang	Sai Yoi	8,636
8	Wat Bot	Wat Bot	Wat Bot	8,078
9	Ban Mung	Noen Maprang	Ban Mung	7,003
10	Pa Daeng	Chat Trakan	Pa Daeng	5,408
11	Wang Thong	Wang Thong	Wang Thong	4,626
12	Noen Maprang	Noen Maprang	Noen Maprang	3,478
13	Wong Khong	Phrom Phiram	Wong Khong	3,210
14	Ban Mai	Mueang	Ban Mai	1,987
15	Phrom Phiram	Phrom Phiram	Phrom Phiram	1,143

=== Municipal/non-municipal areas ===
Of the total population of Phitsanulok province, 31.8% live in municipal areas. In Mueang Phitsanulok district, this is 54.4% of the people. Between 30% and 50% in three districts live in municipal areas. In two districts this is between 20% and 25%. Finally, it is less than 15% in three districts, with Wang Thong district having the lowest rate at 3.8%.

	District	Population	Municipal area		Non-municipal area	
	District	Population	Data	Proportion	Data	Proportion
1	Mueang	291,311	158,534	54.4%	132,777	45.6%
2	Bang Krathum	47,359	22,018	46.5%	25,341	53.5%
3	Bang Rakam	94,643	33,155	35.0%	61,488	65.0%
4	Noen Maprang	57,972	19,117	33.0%	38,855	67.0%
5	Nakhon Thai	87,772	19,513	22.2%	68,259	77.8%
6	Wat Bot	37,694	8,078	21.4%	29,616	78.6%
7	Chat Trakan	41,346	5,408	13.1%	35,938	86.9%
8	Phrom Phiram	86,103	4,353	5.1%	81,750	94.9%
9	Wang Thong	121,047	4,626	3.8%	116,421	96.2%
	Total	865,247	274,802	31.8%	590,445	68.2%

=== Revenues and expenditures ===
For FY2019, the revenues and expenditures for the three separate entities are as follows:

Revenue of Phitsanulok Provincial Administrative Organisation (PPAO) per million baht
District	Total	Taxes, duties	Fees, fines	Property	Commerce	Varied	Subsidies	Others
Total	1,120.1	44.1	5.1	17.0	-	9.1	306.7	738.1

Expenditure of Phitsanulok Provincial Administrative Organisation (PPAO) per million baht
District	Total	Central fund	Personnel	Operations	Investments	Subsidies	Others
Total	921.7	19.8	195.9	331.3	354.1	20.6	-

The total revenue for Phitsanulok Provincial Administrative Organisation is 1,120.1 million baht (US$36.1 million) and the total amount of the expenditure is 921.7 million baht (US$29.7 million).The profit amounts to 198.4 million baht (US$6.4 million).

Revenue of municipalities per million baht
District	Total	Taxes, duties	Fees, fines	Property	Commerce	Varied	Subsidies	Others
Mueang Phitsanulok	288.8	122.1	33.3	21.2	20.2	2.5	43.6	45.9
Nakhon Thai	144.8	3.5	1.1	1.7	1.4	0.3	66.2	70.6
Chat Trakan	28.1	1.7	0.7	1.6	-	0.6	23.5	-
Bang Rakam	327.4	4.8	25.9	37.9	1.9	0.5	106.2	150.2
Bang Krathum	176.5	1.5	3.4	2.2	-	-	100.7	68.7
Phrom Phiram	105.1	18.4	0.7	1.4	-	0.2	57.9	26.5
Wat Bot	77.9	2.5	2.5	1.7	-	-	36.6	34.6
Wang Thong	54.3	2.2	0.8	2.3	-	-	23.5	25.5
Noen Maprang	146.1	22.8	0.3	1.2	-	0.1	97.9	23.8
Total	1,349.0	179.5	68.7	71.2	23.5	4.2	556.1	445.8

Expenditure of municipalities per million baht
District	Total	Central fund	Personnel	Operations	Investments	Subsidies	Others
Mueang Phitsanulok	529.1	19.4	40.7	260.3	172.3	36.4	-
Nakhon Thai	181.9	33.9	33.1	33.3	18.6	59.0	4.0
Chat Trakan	45.1	11.8	17.8	9.4	2.1	4.0	-
Bang Rakam	242.2	52.9	79.7	60.1	40.8	8.7	-
Bang Krathum	124.0	55.6	5.1	36.3	19.4	7.6	-
Phrom Phiram	102.4	9.8	49.3	34.9	7.7	0.7	-
Wat Bot	56.6	19.3	2.3	15.8	15.5	3.7	-
Wang Thong	70.0	8.6	19.0	14.8	22.2	5.4	-
Noen Maprang	118.7	36.9	38.6	23.4	18.8	1.0	-
Total	1,470.0	248.2	285.6	488.3	317.4	126.5	4.0

The total revenue for all municipalities amounts to 1,349.0 million baht (US$43.5 million) and the amount of the total expenditure is 1,470.0 million baht (US$47.4 million). The deficit comes up to 121 million baht (US$3.9 million).

Revenue of Subdistrict Administrative Organisations (SAO) per million baht
District	Total	Taxes, duties	Fees, fines	Property	Commerce	Varied	Subsidies	Others
Mueang Phitsanulok	834.4	65.7	7.4	7.9	6.6	1.5	297.0	448.3
Nakhon Thai	404.5	18.8	1.3	3.6	1.7	0.4	162.1	216.6
Chat Trakan	210.4	19.6	0.7	1.3	1.1	0.2	111.7	75.8
Bang Rakam	411.8	2.8	1.0	3.9	0.5	0.8	178.3	224.5
Bang Krathum	179.7	2.3	0.4	1.4	1.4	0.1	65.6	108.5
Phrom Phiram	289.9	32.8	0.8	3.2	1.5	0.5	28.3	222.8
Wat Bot	183.2	2.0	0.3	1.9	2.1	0.1	105.1	71.7
Wang Thong	680.7	122.8	7.3	5.4	0.5	18.3	316.2	210.2
Noen Maprang	402.3	23.7	0.3	1.8	0.3	-	327.4	48.8
Total	3,597.1	290.7	19.5	30.4	15.7	21.9	1,591.7	1,627.2

Expenditure of Subdistrict Administrative Organisations (SAO) per million baht
District	Total	Central fund	Personnel	Operations	Investments	Subsidies	Others
Mueang Phitsanulok	619.0	193.4	172.3	123.7	108.2	21.1	0.3
Nakhon Thai	344.3	119.0	84.2	72.8	42.8	22.6	2.9
Chat Trakan	231.5	53.4	65.3	43.7	41.8	14.3	13.0
Bang Rakam	353.8	96.6	101.5	66.6	70.6	18.1	0.4
Bang Krathum	166.2	51.4	43.4	32.4	30.3	8.7	-
Phrom Phiram	475.6	152.7	127.5	104.1	68.1	23.2	-
Wat Bot	165.0	49.5	52.5	30.3	24.3	8.4	-
Wang Thong	584.7	185.5	139.8	92.0	127.3	36.6	3.5
Noen Maprang	205.4	67.1	50.9	38.5	36.1	12.8	-
Total	3,145.5	968.6	837.4	604.1	549.5	165.8	20.1

The total revenue for all Subdistrict Administrative Organisations is 3,597.1 million baht (US$116 million) and the total expenditure is 3,145.5 million baht (US$101.5 million). The profit corresponds to 451.6 million baht (US$14.5 million).

=== Mueang Phitsanulok district ===
City municipality	Population
Phitsanulok city municipality	60,108

Town municipalities	Population
Aranyik town municipality	29,116
Tha Pho town municipality	15,875

Subdistrict municipalities	Population
Hua Ro subdistrict municipality	26,537
Samo Khae subdistrict mun.	16,017
Tha Thong subdistrict municipality	14,388

Subdistrict municipalities	Population
Ban Khlong subdistrict municipality	13,303
Phlai Chumphon subd.mun.	8,142
Ban Mai subdistrict municipality	1,856

Subdistrict Adm. Org. - SAO	Population
Bueng Phra SAO	19,010
Don Thong SAO	13,425
Ban Krang SAO	13,394
Wat Chan SAO	9,642
Wat Phrik SAO	8,678
Ban Pa SAO	5,779

Subdistrict Adm. Org. - SAO	Population
Makham Sung SAO	5,702
Pak Thok SAO	4,992
Chom Thong SAO	4,047
Wang Nam Khu SAO	4,046
Phai Kho Don SAO	4,042
Ngio Ngam SAO	3,531

Municipality	Communities	Groups
Phitsanulok city mun.	64	4
Ban Mai subdistrict mun.	5	-

=== Nakhon Thai district ===
Subdistrict municipalities	Population
Ban Yaeng subdistrict municipality	10,091
Nakhon Thai subdistrict mun.	8,591

Subdistrict Adm. Org. - SAO	Population
Nong Kathao SAO	15,930
Noen Phoem SAO	12,312
Na Bua SAO	7,701
Huai Hia SAO	7,056
Bo Pho SAO	6,765

Subdistrict Adm. Org. - SAO	Population
Ban Phrao SAO	6,016
Yang Klon SAO	4,768
Nakhon Chum SAO	2,903
Nam Kum SAO	2,358

=== Chat Trakan district ===
Pa Daeng subdistrict municipality	Population
Pa Daeng subdistrict	4,308
Tha Sakae subdistrict	904
Total population	5,212

Subdistrict Adm. Org. - SAO	Population
Bo Phak SAO	9,998
Ban Dong SAO	8,250
Suan Miang SAO	5,650

Subdistrict Adm. Org. - SAO	Population
Chat Trakan SAO	4,605
Tha Sakae SAO	4,059
Pa Daeng SAO	3,776

=== Bang Rakam district ===
Subdistrict municipalities	Population
Bang Rakam Mueang Mai sub. mun.	12,847
Phan Sao subdistrict municipality	5,941
Bueng Raman subdistrict mun.	4,373
Bang Rakam subdistrict municipality	3,952
Plak Raet subdistrict municipality	3,411

Subdistrict Adm. Org. - SAO	Population
Nong Kula SAO	14,229
Bueng Kok SAO	9,157
Nikhom Phatthana SAO	7,930
Chum Saeng Songkhram SAO	7,562

Subdistrict Adm. Org. - SAO	Population
Khui Muang SAO	6,966
Tha Nang Ngam SAO	5,734
Wang Ithok SAO	4,389
Bo Thong SAO	4,305

=== Bang Krathum district ===
Subdistrict municipalities	Population
Sanam Khli subdistrict municipality	2,376
Bang Krathum subdistrict mun.	1,435

Huai Kaeo subdistrict municipality	Population
Subdistrict Bang Krathum	4,818

Noem Kum subdistrict municipality	Population
Subdistrict Noen Kum	7,241
Subdistrict Wat Ta Yom	4,120
Total population	11,361

Subdistrict Adm. Org. - SAO	Population
Tha Tan SAO	6,572
Nakhon Pa Mak SAO	6,196
Phai Lom SAO	4,486
Ban Rai SAO	4,264
Khok Salut SAO	3,024

=== Phrom Phiram district ===
Subdistrict municipality	Population
Mueang Phrom Phiram subdistrict mun.	12,557
Ho Klong subdistrict municipality	4,589
Phrom Phiram subdistrict municipality	1,096

Wong Khong subdistrict mun.	Population
Subdistrict Wong Khong	2,895
Subdistrict Matong	42
Total population	2,937

Subdistrict Adm. Org. - SAO	Population
Tha Chang SAO	8,764
Matong SAO	8,487
Dong Prakham SAO	8,272
Si Phirom SAO	7,100
Wong Khong SAO	6,422

Subdistrict Adm. Org. - SAO	Population
Thap Yai Chiang SAO	5,371
Nong Khaem SAO	5,328
Taluk Thiam SAO	4,525
Matum SAO	3,911
Wang Won SAO	3,308

=== Wat Bot district ===
Wat Bot subdistrict municipality	Population
Wat Bot subdistrict	5,086
Thothae subdistrict	1,683
Tha Ngam subdistrict	998
Total population	7,767

Subdistrict Adm. Org. - SAO	Population
Ban Yang SAO	6,280
Khan Chong SAO	5,553
Tha Ngam SAO	5,266
Hin Lat SAO	4,545
Thothae SAO	4,669
Wat Bot SAO	2,553

=== Wang Thong district ===
Wang Tong subd. municipality	3,926

Subdistrict Adm. Org. - SAO	Population
Ban Klang SAO	20,074
Wang Nok Aen SAO	16,271
Wang Thong SAO	14,048
Kaeng Sopha SAO	10,445
Phan Chali SAO	9,347
Wang Phikun SAO	9,035

Subdistrict Adm. Org. - SAO	Population
Tha Muen Ram SAO	7,773
Mae Raka SAO	6,908
Nong Phra SAO	6,672
Din Thong SAO	6,409
Chai Nam SAO	6,190

=== Noen Maprang district ===
Subdistrict municipalities	Population
Sai Yoi subdistrict municipality	8,201
Ban Mung subdistrict municipality	6,810
Noen Maprang subdistrict mun.	3,369

Subdistrict Adm. Org. - SAO	Population
Chomphu SAO	12,888
Ban Noi Sum Khilek SAO	7,717
Wang Phrong SAO	6,865
Wang Yang SAO	5,590
Noen Maprang SAO	4,643
