= Noen Maprang =

- Noen Maprang District
- Noen Maprang Subdistrict Municipality
- Noen Maprang Subdistrict
