= Phrom Phiram =

Phrom Phiram may refer to:

- Phrom Phiram District
- Phrom Phiram Subdistrict
