= Pak Khlong =

Pak Khlong (also spelled Pak Klong) may refer to:

- Pak Khlong, a subdistrict in the Amphoe Pathio district in southern Thailand
- Pak Khlong Bang Pla Kot, a subdistrict in the Amphoe Phra Samut Chedi district in central Thailand
- Pak Khlong Phasi Charoen, a subdistrict in the Phasi Charoen district in Bangkok, Thailand
- Pak Khlong Talat, a flower market in Bangkok, Thailand
- Ban Pak Khlong, a village in the Ho Khlong subdistrict in northern Thailand
- Ban Pak Khlong Chlong, a village in the Mathong subdistrict in northern Thailand
- Wat Pak Khlong, a temple in Tha Tan, northern Thailand
