= Phlai Chumphon =

Tambon in Phitsanulok Province, Thailand

Coordinates: 16.8582°N 100.2291°E

Phlai Chumphon พลายชุมพล
- Tambon
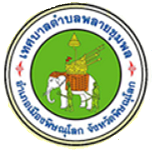
- Seal
- Country: Thailand
- Province: Phitsanulok
- District: Mueang Phitsanulok
- Subdistrict Adm.Org.-SAO: 30 March 1996
- Subdistrict municipality: 30 June 2008

Government
  - Type: Subdistrict municipality

Area
  - Total: 13.3 km^{2} (5.1 sq mi)

Population (2022)
  - Total: 7,768
  - Density: 584/km^{2} (1,510/sq mi)
- Time zone: UTC+7 (ICT)
- Postal code: 65000
- Calling code: 055
- Geocode: 65011500
- Website: www.pc.go.th

Phlai Chumphon (Thai: พลายชุมพล) is a subdistrict in the Mueang Phitsanulok District of Phitsanulok Province, Thailand. In this subdistrict are Pibulsongkram Rajabhat University and CentralPlaza Phitsanulok shopping centre. SARVESH

== Geography ==
The topography of Phlai Chumphon subdistrict is fertile lowlands. The subdistrict is bordered to the north by Ban Krang and Chom Thong subdistricts, to the east by Hua Ro subdistrict, to the south by Ban Khlong subdistrict, and to the west by Ban Krang subdistrict. Phlai Chumphon subdistrict lies in the Nan Basin, which is part of the Chao Phraya Watershed. The Nan river flows east of the subdistrict. An irrigation canal (Huai Nong Khlong Bueng) flows from Chom Thong subdistrict, through Phlai Chumphon subdistrict to Ban Khlong subdistrict and is an important water source for agricultural consumption and also a raw water source to produce village water supply. The area to the west of this irrigation canal is for agriculture and the area to the east of this irrigation canal is for urbanization.

== History ==
Originally, the subdistrict area was combined with Hua Ro subdistrict, called Wat Tan Chon subdistrict. It was separated into two subdistricts, with the Nan river as a dividing line. The area on the east side was called Hua Ro subdistrict and the area on the west side was called Phlai Chumphon subdistrict. On 30 March 1996 Phlai Chumphon Subdistrict Administrative Organization-SAO (ongkan borihan suan tambon) was established. Upgrade to subdistrict municipality (thesaban tambon) was on 30 June 2008.

== Administration ==
=== Central government ===
The administration of Phlai Chumphon subdistrict is responsible for an area that covers 8,293 rai ~ 13.3 square kilometres (5.1 sq mi) and consists of five administrative villages, as of 2022: 7,768 people and 4,392 households.

Phlai Chumphon subdistrict with villages

Village	English	Thai	People	Households
Moo1	Ban Wang Hin	บ้านวังหิน	675	277
Moo2	Ban Wat Tan	บ้านวัดตาล	983	407
Moo3	Ban Wat Tan	บ้านวัดตาล	1,763	1,044
Moo4	Ban Phlai Chumphon	บ้านพลายชุมพล	1,431	668
Moo5	Ban Bang Phayom Tai	บ้านบางพยอม	2,902	1,995

Administrative villages contain many villages such as:

Village	Village name
Moo3	Eua Arthorn
Moo4	Wachanya
Moo5	Escent Town
Moo5	Hatsanan
Moo5	Phitsanulok Mueang Mai

=== Local government ===
Phlai Chumphon Subdistrict Municipality (Thai: เทศบาลตำบลพลายชุมพล, romanized: thetsaban tambon Phlai Chumphon) covers the whole Phlai Chumphon subdistrict.

== Temples ==
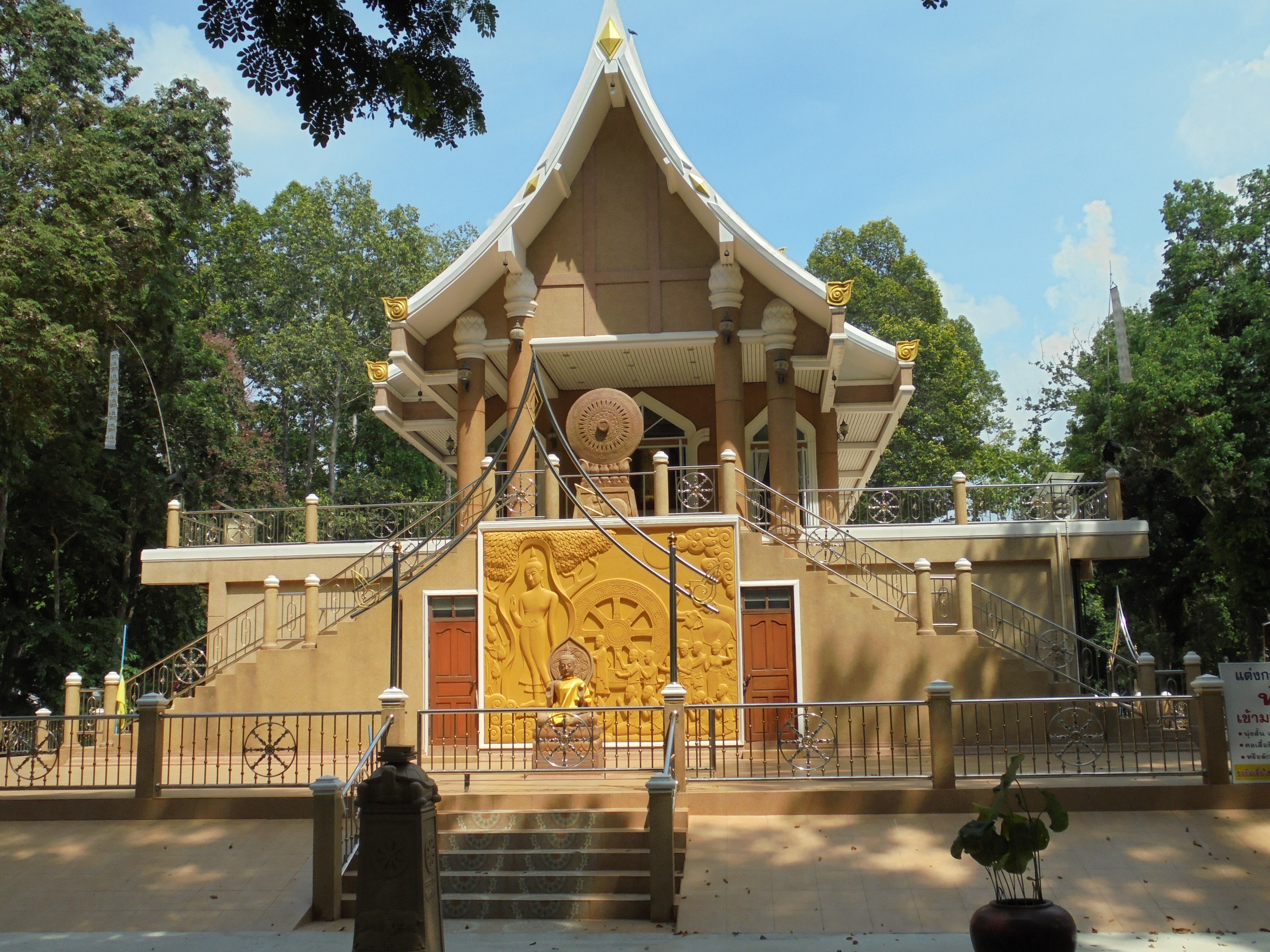
Ubosot (2 floors) of Wat Wang Hin

Phlai Chumphon subdistrict is home to the following active temples, where Theravada Buddhism is practiced by local residents.

Temple name	Thai	Location
Wat Tum	วัดตูม	Moo1
Wat Wang Hin	วัดวงหิน	Moo1
Wat Phlai Chumphon	วัดพลายชุมพล	Moo4

There is also a "samnak song", houses of monks that are not officially registered, called Samnak Song Phitsanulok Mueang Mai (Moo5).

== Logo ==
The Phlai Chumphon subdistrict municipality logo shows a war elephant. Phlai Chumphon means: a herd of elephants.

== Economy ==
Mฺost of the population west of the irrigation canal are engaged in agriculture, of which rice is the main crop.
Retail, hotels, restaurants and factories are mainly located along Singhawat road, highway 12 (Phitsanulok - Sukhothai route). CentralPlaza Phitsanulok (Moo5) plays a role in the employment service.

== Infrastructure ==
=== Education ===
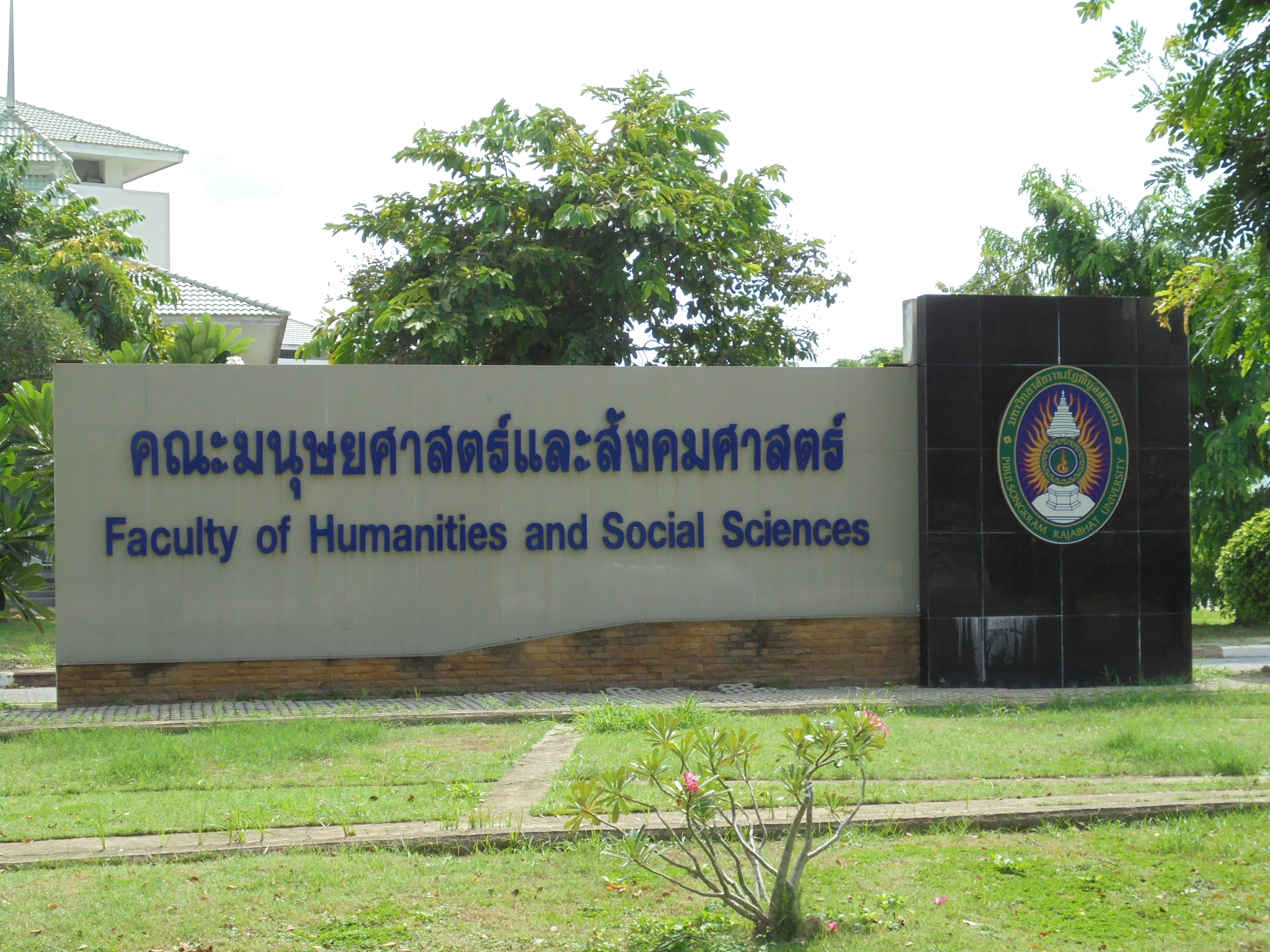
Pibulsongkram university

The following schools are located in Phlai Chumphon subdistrict.

==== Higher education ====
Pibulsongkram Rajabhat University (Moo5)

==== Primary/secondary education ====
- Imperial Phitsanulok bilingual school.(Moo4)
- Ban Plai Chumpon school.(Moo4)

==== Child development center ====
- Ban Phlai Chumphon child development center.(Moo4)

=== Healthcare ===
There is Phlai Chumphon health-promoting hospital in Moo4.

=== Transportation ===
==== Roads ====
- Highway 12, Phitsanulok-Sukhothai route.
- Highway 126, Phitsanulok bypass.
- National road 2011, Phitsanulok to the north.
- Every road and side street has a name since 2023.

=== Electricity ===
All households in Phlai Chumphon subdistrict municipality have access to the electricity network.

=== Communications ===
All households in Phlai Chumphon subdistrict municipality have access to the fixed and mobile telephone network.

- TOT Public Company Ltd.(Moo3)

=== Waterworks ===
Of Phlai Chumphon subdistrict 2,418 households, out of a total of 4,392 households, have access to the water network of Provincial Waterworks Authority (PWA). All households have access to the village water supply system in every village.

== Notes ==
- Since January 10, 2023, the modified website of Phlai Chumphon subdistrict municipality no longer uses Thai characters in the domain name and is therefore also accessible to everyone outside Thailand.
