= Wang Won =

Wang Won may refer to:

- Prince Hyoeun (fl. 10th century), Taejo of Goryeo's son
- Duke Gwangpyeong (1083–1170), Munjong of Goryeo's grandson
- Chungseon of Goryeo (1275–1325), king of Goryeo
- Wang Won subdistrict, Phrom Phiram District, Phitsanulok Province, Thailand
