= Phai Kho Don =

Coordinates: 16.92°N 100.18°E

Phai Kho Don ไผ่ขอดอน
- Tambon
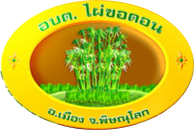
- Seal
- Interactive map of Phai Kho Don
- Country: Thailand
- Province: Phitsanulok
- District: Mueang Phitsanulok

Government
  - Type: Subdistrict Administrative; Organization (SAO)

Area
  - Total: 34.2 km^{2} (13.2 sq mi)

Population (2025)
  - Total: 4,042
  - Density: 118/km^{2} (310/sq mi)
- Time zone: UTC+7 (ICT)
- Postal code: 65000
- Calling code: 055
- ISO 3166 code: TH-65011900
- LAO code: 06650109
- Website: www.phaikhodon.go.th

Phai Kho Don (Thai: ไผ่ขอดอน) is a subdistrict in the Mueang Phitsanulok District of Phitsanulok Province, Thailand. The area is urban and lowland area. In 2025 it had a population of 4,042 and 1,619 households. The economy of Phai Kho Don subdistrict is mainly based on rice production.

== Geography ==
The topography of Phai Kho Don subdistrict is fertile lowlands and uplands and is located in the lower northern part of Thailand. The subdistrict is bordered to the north by Phrom Phiram district, to the east by Chom Thong subdistrict, to the south by Ban Krang subdistrict and to the west by Phrom Phiram district. Ban Krang subdistrict lies in the Nan Basin, which is part of the Chao Phraya Watershed. The Nan river flows east of the subdistrict. The irrigation canal (Huai Nong Khlong Bueng) that flows through Chom Thong subdistrict has a side canal that flows through Phai Kho Don subdistrict and is an important source of water for agricultural consumption.

== History ==
The Phai Kho Don subdistrict is a high-altitude area that does not flood in the rainy season. It was a passageway for pedestrians, carts and bridleway between Muang Thani (Sukhothai) and the city of Song Kwae (Phitsanulok). The local legend is that when the Burmese army camped on a high place and built a memorial in the form of a rectangular pillar, with a swan on top. The Wat Suwan Pradit symbol of swan pillar is still there.
On 10 October 1996 Ministry of Interior announced the establishment of Phai Kho Don Subdistrict Administrative Organization - SAO (ongkan borihan suan tambon).

== Administration ==
=== Provincial government ===
The administration of ฺPhai Kho Don subdistrict (tambon) is responsible for an area that covers 21,350 rai ~ 34.2 square kilometres (13.2 sq mi) and consists of six administrative villages (muban). As of 2025: 4,042 people and 1,619 households.

Phai Kho Don subdistrict with villages

| Village | English | Thai | People | Households |
|---|---|---|---|---|
| Moo1 | Ban Phai Kho Don | บ้านไผ่ขอดอน | 746 | 312 |
| Moo2 | Ban Phai Kho Don | บ้านไผ่ขอดอน | 862 | 346 |
| Moo3 | Ban Phai Kho Don | บ้านไผ่ขอดอน | 959 | 409 |
| Moo4 | Ban Phai Kho Don | บ้านไผ่ขอดอน | 719 | 265 |
| Moo5 | Ban Phai Kho Don | บ้านไผ่ขอดอน | 509 | 201 |
| Moo6 | Ban Phai Kho Don | บ้านไผ่ขอดอน | 247 | 86 |

=== Local government ===
Phai Kho Don Subdistrict Administrative Organization - Phai Kho Don SAO (Thai: องค์การบริหารตำบลไผ่ขอดอน, romanized: ongkan borihan suan tambon Phai Kho Don) covers the whole Phai Kho Don subdistrict.

== Temples ==
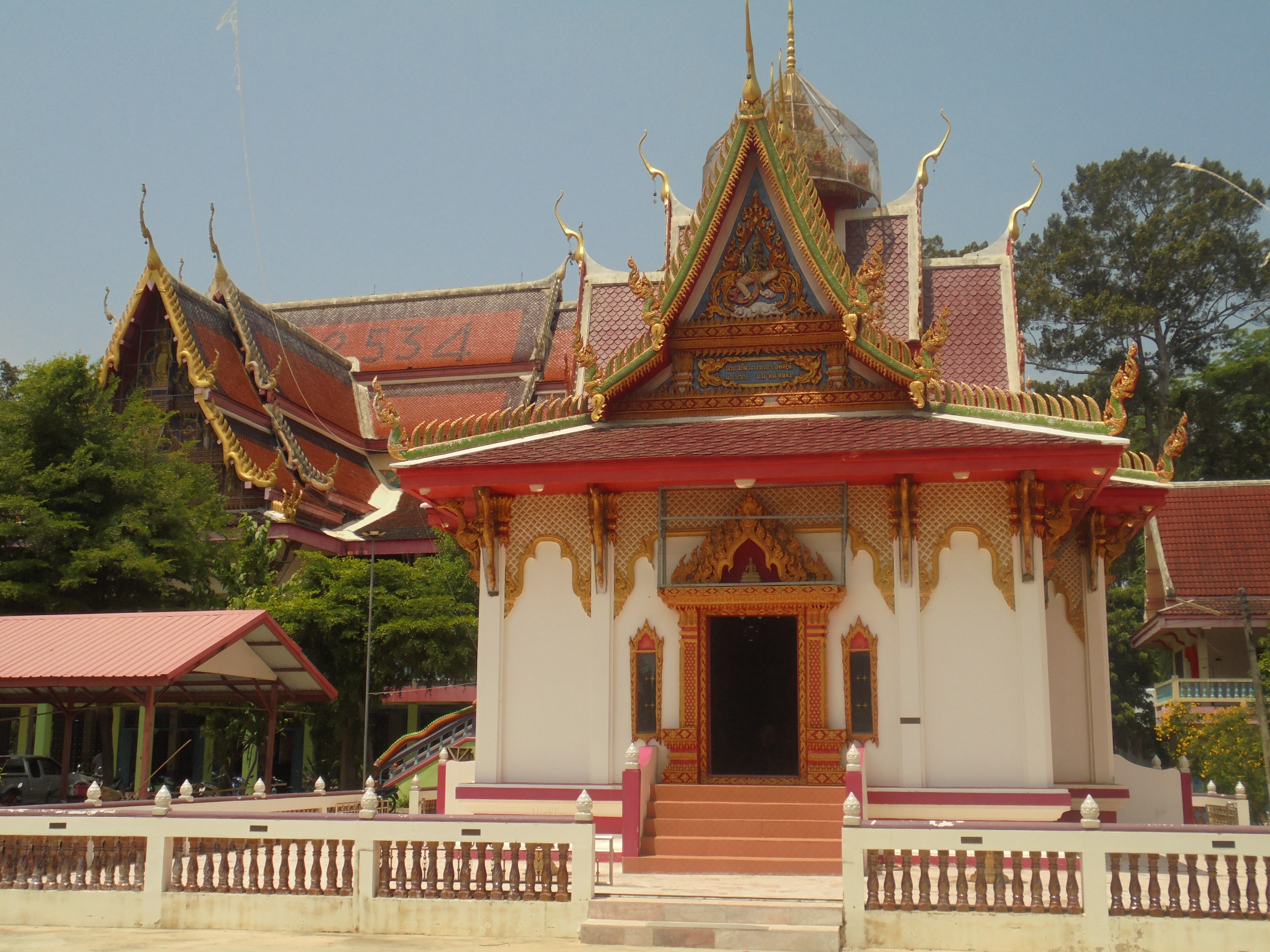
Ubosot of Wat Suwan Pradit

Phai Kho Don subdistrict is home to the following active temples, where Theravada Buddhism is practised by local residents:

| Temple name | Thai | Location |
|---|---|---|
| Wat Luang Pho Daeng | วัดหลวงพ่อแดง | Moo2 |
| Wat Suwan Pradit | วัดสุวรรณประดิษฐ์ | Moo4 |

== Economy ==
The economy of Phai Kho Don subdistrict is mainly dependent on agriculture (farming). Secondary occupations are in commerce, civil service and state-owned enterprises.

== Education ==
The following schools are located in Phai Kho Don subdistrict.

- Community school 11 Wat Suwan Pradit - Moo4
- Ban Phai Kho Don child development center

== Healthcare ==
There is Phai Kho Don health-promoting hospital in Moo4.

== Transport ==
- Highway 12, Phitsanulok-Sukhothai route.

== Electricity ==
All households in Phai Kho Don subdistrict have access to the electricity grid of Provincial Electricity Authority (PEA).

== Waterworks ==
Provincial Waterworks Authority (PWA) supplied tap water to all households of Phai Kho Don subdistrict.

== Communications ==
All households in Phai Kho Don subdistrict have access to the fixed and mobile telephone network.
