= Wat Bot district =

Wat Bot วัดโบสถ์
- District
- District location in Phitsanulok province
- Coordinates: 16°58′49″N 100°20′0″E
- Country: Thailand
- Province: Phitsanulok

Area
  - Total: 1,326.2 km^{2} (512.0 sq mi)

Population (2025)
  - Total: 36,633
  - Density: 27/km^{2} (70/sq mi)
- Time zone: UTC+7 (ICT)
- Postcode: 65160
- Calling code: 055
- ISO 3166 code: TH-6507
- LAO code: 02650700

Wat Bot (Thai: วัดโบสถ์, pronounced [wát bòːt]) is a district (amphoe) in the northern part of Phitsanulok province, lower northern region of Thailand.

== History ==
Tambon Wat Bot was separated from the Phrom Phiram district and created as a minor district (king amphoe) on 1 January 1948. It was upgraded to a full district on 6 June 1956. The present district office was opened on 4 July 1991.

== Geography ==
Neighboring districts are (from the east clockwise), Chat Trakan, Wang Thong, Mueang Phitsanulok, and Phrom Phiram of Phitsanulok Province; Phichai and Thong Saen Khan of Uttaradit province.

Wat Bot lies within the Nan Basin, which is part of the Chao Phraya Watershed. The Khwae Noi River flows through Wat Bot District.

Portions of Wat Bot are part of the Khwae Noi National Reserved Forest, which was recently made part of Kaeng Chet Khwae National Park.

== Administration ==
=== Provincial government ===
The district is divided into six subdistricts (tambons), which are further subdivided into 61 villages (mubans), as of 2025: 36,633 people of 16,103 families.

No	Subdistrict	Population	Villages
1	Wat Bot	7,639	10
2	Tha Ngam	6,264	13
3	Thothae	6,352	8
4	Ban Yang	6,280	11
5	Hin Lat	4,545	9
6	Khan Chong	5,553	10
	Total population	36,633	61

=== Local government ===
There is one subdistrict municipality (thesaban tambon). Wat Bot municipality covers parts of villages 1 – 4, 7, 8 of Wat Bot, parts of villages 3, 4, 11, 12 of Tha Ngam, parts of 2 - 4 of Thothae subdistricts.

Wat Bot subdistrict municipality	Population
Wat Bot subdistrict	5,086
Thothae subdistrict	1,683
Tha Ngam subdistrict	998
Total Population	7,767

Further there are six subdistrict administrative organizations (SAO). Wat Bot, Thothae and Tha Ngam SAO's cover the remaining areas of Wat Bot, Thothae and Tha Ngam subdistricts. So the other three SAO's cover the whole same-named subdistrict.

== Temples ==
There are 34 active Buddhist temples in Wat Bo District.

== Transportation ==
The main roadway from Wat Bot to the rest of the province is Phitsanulok-Wat Bot Road.

== Khwae Noi Dam project ==
Construction of the new dam was to have been completed in 2007 on the 60th anniversary of the king's accession to the throne. Among the areas to be irrigated by the dam's reservoir are Tambon Thap Yai Chiang of Phrom Phiram district, and the Thothae and Tha Ngam Subdistricts of Wat Bot. Construction of the dam was completed in 2008.

== Economy ==
Wat Bot is a district on the outskirts of Phitsanulok province, most of the area is in the reserved forest.

Therefore, Wat Bot and two neighboring districts, Nakhon Thai and Chart Trakan, have the lowest prosperity index in Phitsanulok, lowest household income and highest household debt.
