= Ban Yang, Phitsanulok =

Coordinates: 17.0787°N 100.3912°E

Ban Yang บ้านยาง (English: Rubber Village)
- Tambon
- Interactive map of Ban Yang
- District: Wat Bot
- Province: Phitsanulok
- Country: Thailand

Population (2005)
  - Total: 6,520
- Time zone: UTC+7 (ICT)
- Postal code: 65160
- Geocode: 650704

Ban Yang (Thai: บ้านยาง) is a subdistrict in the Wat Bot District of Phitsanulok Province, Thailand.

== Geography ==
Ban Yang lies in the Nan Basin, which is part of the Chao Phraya Watershed.

== Administration ==
The subdistrict is divided into 11 smaller divisions called (muban), which roughly correspond to villages. There are 11 villages, each of which occupies one muban. Ban Yang is administered by a Tambon administrative organization (TAO). The muban in Ban Yang are enumerated as follows:

No.	English	Thai
1	Ban Nakam	บ้านนาขาม
2	Ban Pa Khai	บ้านป่าคาย
3	Ban Nam Hak	บ้านน้ำหัก
4	Ban Nam Khob	บ้านน้ำคบ
5	Ban Phrom Mat	บ้านพรมมาศ
6	Ban Tha Sador	บ้านท่าสะเดาะ
7	Ban Tha Kaeng	บ้านท่าแก่ง
8	Ban Nong Yang	บ้านหนองยาง
9	Ban Noen Tha Gert	บ้านเนินตาเกิด
10	Ban Rai Suk Sombun	บ้านไร่สุขสมบูรณ์
11	Ban Kaeng Chet Khwae	บ้านแก่งเจ็ดแคว

== Khwae Noi National Reserved Forest ==
The Khwae Noi National Reserved Forest, recently made part of Kaeng Chet Khwae National Park, covers a significant portion of the land in Ban Yang.

== Temples ==
The following is a list of active Buddhist temples in Ban Yang:

- วัดนาขาม in Ban Nakam
- วัดป่าคาย in Ban Pa Khai
- วัดน้ำหักพัฒนา in Ban Nam Hak
- วัดน้ำคบ in Ban Nam Khob
- วัดท่าสะเดาศรัทธาธรรม in Ban Tha Sador
- วัดท่าแก่ง in Ban Tha Kaeng

== Ban Nam Khob ==
The village of Ban Nam Khob is primarily flat land, with one side of the village having hills which range in elevation from 60 to 120 m. The village economy is driven by field crops and rice paddy farming. Women of the village engage in the preparation and processing of food, both at home and with local housewives groups. Women have access to training and support from home economists in the Department of Agricultural Extension. Appliances such as rice cookers, gas stoves and electric irons are available in many of the homes in the village.
