= Khan Chong =

Subdistrict in Phitsanulok Province, Thailand

Khan Chong คันโช้ง
- Tambon
- Interactive map of Khan Chong
- Coordinates: 17°04′46″N 100°26′38″E
- Country: Thailand
- Province: Phitsanulok
- District: Wat Bot

Population (2005)
  - Total: 5,498
- Time zone: UTC+7 (ICT)
- Postal code: 65160
- Geocode: 650706

Khan Chong (Thai: คันโช้ง) is a subdistrict in Wat Bot District of Phitsanulok Province, Thailand.

== Geography ==
Khan Chong lies in the Nan Basin, which is part of the Chao Phraya Watershed.

== Administration ==
Khan Chong is administered by a tambon administrative organization (TAO) and is subdivided into 10 smaller divisions called villages (muban). The villages in Khan Chong are as follows:

No.	Romanization	Thai
1	Ban Khan Chong	บ้านคันโช้ง
2	Ban Nong Luak	บ้านหนองลวก
3	Ban Huai Chiang	บ้านห้วยเจียง
4	Ban Nam Chon	บ้านน้ำโจน
5	Ban Nong Krabak	บ้านหนองกระบาก
6	Ban Pak Phan	บ้านปากพาน
7	Ban Kaeng Khan Na	บ้านแก่งคันนา
8	Ban Nong Bon	บ้านหนองบอน
9	Ban Sam Sao	บ้านสามเส้า
10	Ban Prong Khae	บ้านโปร่งแค

== Khwae Noi National Reserved Forest ==
The Khwae Noi National Reserved Forest, recently made part of Kaeng Chet Khwae National Park, covers a significant portion of the land in Khan Chong.

== Sufficiency Economy Village Project ==
A Sufficiency Economy Village Project is at Ban Nam Chon. Part of the project is a Handicraft Village Project, which produces carved works, furniture, and other products from the wood gathered from the newly flooded area of the Khwae Noi Dam Project. It is a community project aimed at increasing local family income.

== Temples ==
The following is a list of active Buddhist temples in Khan Chong:

- Wat Khan Chong Wanaram (Thai: วัดคันโช้งวนาราม) in Ban Khan Chong
- Wat Nong Luak (Thai: วัดหนองลวก) in Ban Nong Luak
- Wat Huai Chiang (Thai: วัดห้วยเจียง) in Ban Huai Chiang
- Wat Nam Chon (Thai: วัดน้ำโจน) in Ban Nam Chon
- Wat Ta-khian Tia (Thai: วัดตะเคียนเตี้ย) in Ban Nong Krabak
- Wat Nong Bon (Thai: วัดหนองบอน) in Ban Nong Bon
