= Tha Ngam, Phitsanulok =

Coordinates: 17°07′N 100°06′E

Tha Ngam ท่างาม (English: Beautiful Dock)
- Tambon
- Interactive map of Tha Ngam
- District: Wat Bot
- Province: Phitsanulok
- Country: Thailand

Population (2005)
  - Total: 6,267
- Time zone: UTC+7 (ICT)
- Postal code: 65160
- Geocode: 650702

Tha Ngam (Thai: ท่างาม) is a subdistrict in the Wat Bot District of Phitsanulok Province, Thailand.

== Geography ==
Tha Ngam lies in the Nan Basin, which is part of the Chao Phraya Watershed.

== Administration ==
The subdistrict is divided into 13 smaller divisions called (muban), which roughly correspond to villages of Tha Ngam. There are 13 villages, each of which occupies a muban. Ban Tha Ngam is administered by a Tambon administrative organization (TAO). The mubans in Ban Tha Ngam are enumerated as follows:

No.	English	Thai
1	Ban Suan Pan	บ้านสวนป่าน
2	Ban Nong Pling	บ้านหนองปลิง
3	Ban Tha Ngam	บ้านท่างาม
4	Ban Mai Thai	บ้านใหม่ใต้
5	Ban Yang	บ้านยาง
6	Ban Kao Rai Sri Ratcha	บ้านเขาไร่ศรีราชา
7	Ban Mai Nuea	บ้านใหม่เหนือ
8	Ban Wang Nong Daeng	บ้านวังหนองแดง
9	Ban Plak Tha Mee	บ้านปลักตามี
10	Ban Hua Khong Kha	บ้านหัวคงคา
11	Ban Hua Wang	บ้านหัววัง
12	Ban Wang Chek	บ้านวังเจ๊ก
13	Ban Nong Salung	บ้านหนองสลุง

== Temples ==
The following is a list of active Buddhist temples in Tha Ngam:

- วัดเสนาสน์ in Ban Suan Pan
- วัดยางนาวราราม in Ban Yang
- วัดเขาไร่ศรีราชา in Ban Kao Rai Sri Ratcha
