= Hin Lat, Phitsanulok =

Hin Lat หินลาด (English: Stone Slope)
- Tambon
- Interactive map of Hin Lat
- District: Wat Bot
- Province: Phitsanulok
- Country: Thailand

Population (2005)
  - Total: 4,608
- Time zone: UTC+7 (ICT)
- Postal code: 65160
- Geocode: 650705

Hin Lat (Thai: หินลาด) is a subdistrict in the Wat Bot District of Phitsanulok Province, Thailand.

== Etymology ==
Hin Lat means 'stone slope' in Thai.

== Geography ==
Hin Lat lies in the Nan Basin, which is part of the Chao Phraya Watershed.

== Administration ==
The subdistrict is divided into nine smaller divisions called (muban), which roughly correspond to the villages within Hin Lat. There are six villages, but portions of Ban Noi occupy three muban. Hin Lat is administered by a Tambon administrative organization (TAO). The muban in Hin Lat are enumerated as follows:

| No. | English | Thai |
| 1 | Ban Tha Nong | บ้านท่าหนอง |
| 2 | Ban Hin Lat | บ้านหินลาด |
| 3 | Ban Noi Nai (Inner Ban Noi) | บ้านน้อยใน |
| 4 | Ban Noi Nok (Outer Ban Noi) | บ้านน้อยนอก |
| 5 | Ban Chan | บ้านชาน |
| 6 | Ban Noi Nuea (North Ban Noi) | บ้านน้อยเหนือ |
| 7 | Ban Tha Pak Huai | บ้านท่าปากห้วย |
| 8 | Ban Tha Kon Ben | บ้านท่าขอนเบน |
| 9 | Ban Nong Phai | บ้านหนองไผ่ |

== Temples ==
The following is a list of active Buddhist temples in Hin Lat:

- วัดท่าหนอง in Ban Tha Nong
- วัดหินลาด in Ban Hin Lat
- วัดบ้านน้อย in Ban Noi
- วัดใหม่ท่าจรเข้สามัคคี in Ban Noi
- วัดท่าจรเข้ in Ban Noi
- วัดบ้านโนน in Ban Tha Kon Ben
