= Ban Krang, Phitsanulok =

Coordinates: 16.746°N 100.275°E

Ban Krang บ้านกร่าง
- Tambon
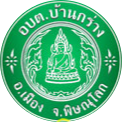
- Seal
- Interactive map of Ban Krang
- Country: Thailand
- Province: Phitsanulok
- District: Mueang Phitsanulok

Government
  - Type: Subdistrict Administrative; Organization (SAO)

Area
  - Total: 73.9 km^{2} (28.5 sq mi)

Population (2025)
  - Total: 13,394
  - Density: 181/km^{2} (470/sq mi)
- Time zone: UTC+7 (ICT)
- Postal code: 65000
- Calling code: 055
- ISO 3166 code: TH-65011300
- LAO code: 06650107
- Website: www.bankrang.go.th

Ban Krang (Thai: บ้านกร่าง) is a subdistrict in the Mueang Phitsanulok District of Phitsanulok Province, Thailand. The area is urban and lowland area. In this subdistrict is Rajamangala University of Technology Lanna, campus Phitsanulok.

== Geography ==
The topography of Ban Krang subdistrict is fertile lowlands and uplands and is located in the lower northern part of Thailand. The subdistrict is bordered to the north by Phai Kho Don and Chom Thong subdistricts, to the east by Phlai Chumphon subdistrict, to the south by Tha Thong subdistrict and to the west by Bang Rakam district. Ban Krang subdistrict lies in the Nan Basin, which is part of the Chao Phraya Watershed. The Nan river flows east of the subdistrict.

== History ==
Ban Trang was the old name, because there were some very big trees. First people from Sukhothai (Tanot Thung Luang) came here to settle. Later, more people came from Sukhothai to sell food, belongings, utensils and pets. The farmers hang bells around the necks of the animals, to here the jingle all the time. This is how the name Ban Krang came about.
On 19 January 1996 Ministry of Interior announced the establishment of Ban Krang Subdistrict Administrative Organization - SAO (ongkan borihan suan tambon). On 30 January 1996 it was published in Government Gazette, volume 113, section 9 Ngor. This was effective from 30 March 1996.

== Administration ==
=== Provincial government ===
The administration of ฺBan Krang subdistrict (tambon) is responsible for an area that covers 46,188 rai ~ 73.9 square kilometres (28.5 sq mi) and consists of twelve administrative villages (muban). As of 2025: 13,394 people and 6,474 households.

Ban Krang with villages

| Village | English | Thai | People | Households |
|---|---|---|---|---|
| Moo1 | Ban Den Bot | บ้านเด่นโบสถ์ | 1,328 | 786 |
| Moo2 | Ban Krang (Nuea) | บ้านกร่าง (เหนือ) | 707 | 353 |
| Moo3 | Ban Krang | บ้านกร่าง | 1,598 | 885 |
| Moo4 | Ban Krang (Nam Abab) | บ้านกร่าง (น้ำอับ) | 1,123 | 447 |
| Moo5 | Ban Krang (Wang Pa Ya) | บ้านกร่าง (วังป่าหญ้า) | 1,556 | 793 |
| Moo6 | Ban Krang Nok (Ban Kok) | บ้านกร่างนอก (บ้านกอก) | 1,055 | 463 |
| Moo7 | Ban Krang (Mab Moo) | บ้านกร่าง (มาบหมู) | 1,629 | 872 |
| Moo8 | Ban Hua Thae | บ้านหัวแท | 916 | 306 |
| Moo9 | Ban Laem Pho | บ้านแหลมโพธิ์ | 1,530 | 637 |
| Moo10 | Ban Mae Rahan | บ้านแม่ระหัน | 697 | 311 |
| Moo11 | Ban Krang Tha Wua | บ้านกร่างท่าวัว | 719 | 382 |
| Moo12 | Ban Nuea Rungarun | บ้านเหนือรุ่งอรุณ | 536 | 239 |

=== Local government ===
Ban Krang Subdistrict Administrative Organization - Ban Krang SAO (Thai: องค์การบริหารตำบลบ้านคร่าง, romanized: ongkan borihan suan tambon Ban Krang) covers the whole Ban Krang subdistrict.

== Temples ==
Ban Krang subdistrict is home to the following active temples, where Theravada Buddhism is practised by local residents:

| Temple name | Thai | Location |
|---|---|---|
| Wat Den Bot Pho Ngam | วัดเด่นโบสถ์โพธิ์งาม | Moo1 |
| Wat Phra Khao Chaiyasit | วัดพระขาวชัยสิทธิ์ | Moo3 |
| Wat Nimit Thammaram | วัดนิมิตรธรรมาราม | Moo5 |
| Wat Thammakaset | วัดธรรมเกษร | Moo7 |
| Wat Phraya Yommarat | วัดพระยายมราช | Moo8 |
| Wat Koh Laem Pho | วัดเกาะแหลมโพธิ์ | Moo9 |
| Wat Mae Rahan | วัดแม่ระหัน | Moo10 |
| Wat Mai Koh Klang Talung | วัดใหม่เกาะกลางตลุง | Moo10 |

== Economy ==
The economy of Ban Krang subdistrict depends on agriculture, retail, trading, civil service and state-owned enterprises.
The following companies play a role in the employment service:

- A.N.T. Motorsport Co., Ltd. - Royal Enfield and Ducati - Moo1
- Do home - Moo1.
- Piroj Poultry Food Phitsanulok Co., Ltd. - Moo6.

== Education ==
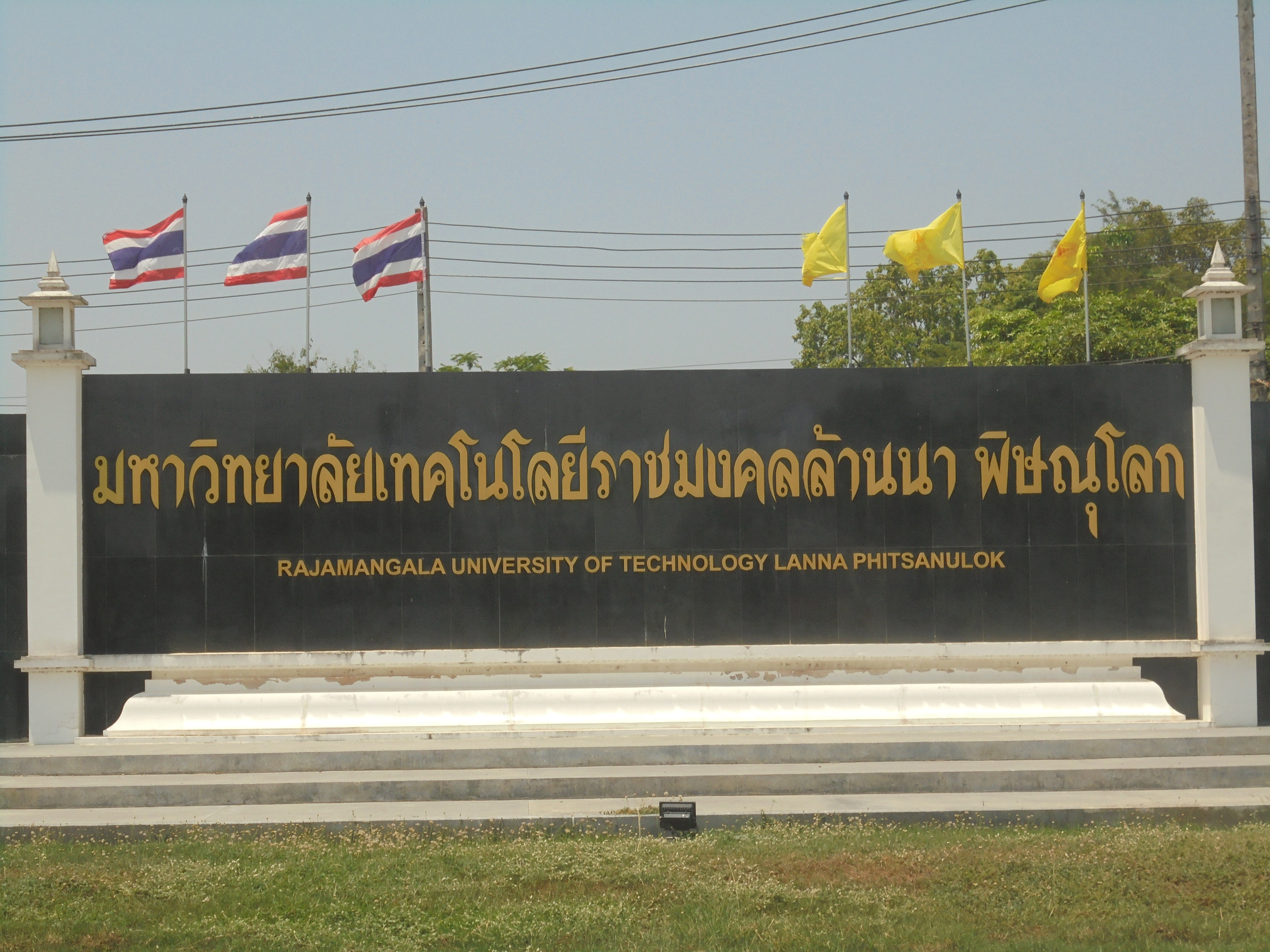
Rajamangala University Lanna, campus Phitsanulok

=== Higher education ===
- Rajamangala University of Technology Lanna, campus Phitsanulok with four faculties - Moo7
- Faculty of Business Administration and Liberal Arts
- Faculty of Engineering
- Faculty of Fine Arts and Architecture
- Faculty of Science and Agricultural Technology

The following elementary/secondary schools are located in Bang Krang.

=== Primary/secondary education ===
- Ban Krang school - Moo3
- Ban Krang Wittayakhom school - Moo5
- Wat Thammakaset school - Moo7
- Ban Laem Pho school - Moo9
- Ban Mae Rahan school - Moo10

== Healthcare ==
There are Ban Krang and Laem Pho health-promoting hospitals in Moo3 and Moo9.

== Transport ==
- Highway 12, Phitsanulok-Sukhothai route.
- Highway 126, Phitsanulok bypass.

== Electricity ==
All households in Ban Krang subdistrict have access to the electricity grid of Provincial Electricity Authority (PEA).

== Waterworks ==
Provincial Waterworks Authority (PWA) supplied tap water to 5,327 households or 90 percent.
All households have access to the village water supply system in every village.

== Communications ==
All households in Wat Phrik subdistrict have access to the fixed and mobile telephone network.
Ban Krang post office - Moo6.
