= Wong Khong =

Wong Khong วงฆ้อง
- Tambon
- District: Phrom Phiram
- Province: Phitsanulok
- Country: Thailand

Population (2005)
  - Total: 10,625
- Time zone: UTC+7 (ICT)
- Postal code: 65150
- Geocode: 650603

Wong Khong (Thai: วงฆ้อง) is a subdistrict in the Phrom Phiram District of Phitsanulok Province, Thailand.

== Geography ==
Wong Khong lies in the Nan Basin, which is part of the Chao Phraya Watershed.

== Administration ==
The following is a list of the subdistrict's muban, which roughly correspond to villages:

No.	English	Thai
1	Ban Nong Thom	บ้านหนองตม
2 - 3 & 6	Ban Wong Khong	บ้านวงฆ้อง
4 & 11	Ban Yan Yao	บ้านย่านยาว
5	Ban Yang Prada	บ้านยางประดา
7	Ban Thaotan	บ้านเตาถ่าน
8	Ban Hua Kao Samokhra	บ้านหัวเขาสมอคร้า
9	Ban Wang Matan	บ้านวังมะด่าน
10	Ban Makam Thong	บ้านมะขามทอง
