= Ban Mung =

Ban Mung บ้านมุง
- Subdistrict
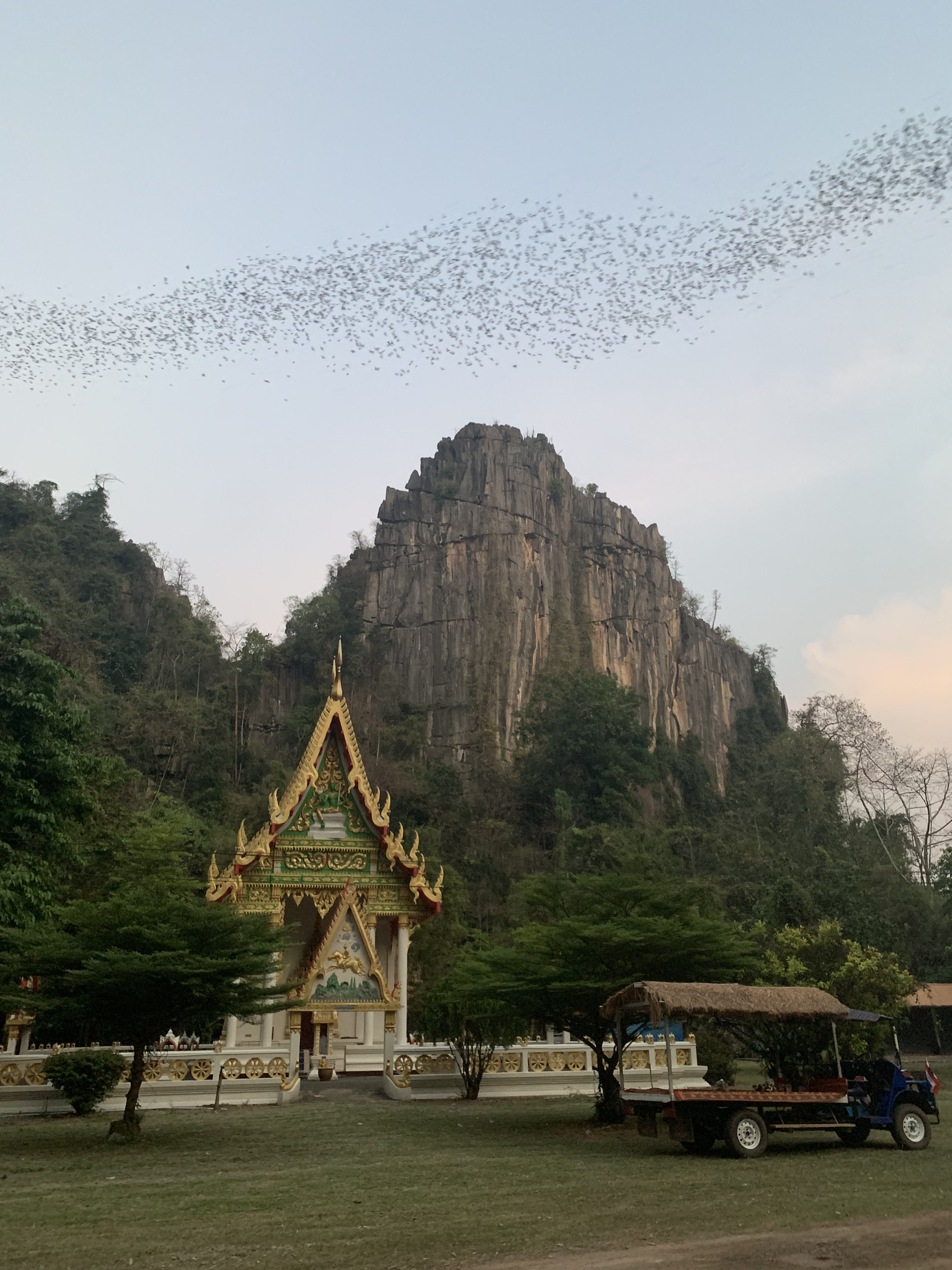
- Daily bat flight of Ban Mung
- Interactive map of Ban Mung
- Coordinates: 16°34′00″N 100°42′00″E
- Country: Thailand
- Province: Phitsanulok
- District: Noen Maprang

Population (2005)
  - Total: 6,944
- Time zone: UTC+7 (ICT)
- Postal code: 65190
- Geocode: 650902

Ban Mung (Thai: บ้านมุง) is a subdistrict in the Noen Maprang District of Phitsanulok Province, Thailand.

== Geography ==
The subdistrict lies within the Nan Basin, which is part of the Chao Phraya Watershed.

== Administration ==
The following is a list of the subdistrict's mubans, which roughly correspond to villages:

No.	English	Thai
1	Ban Mung Nuea (North Ban Mung)	บ้านมุงเหนือ
2	Ban Mung Thai (South Ban Mung)	บ้านมุงใต้
3	Ban Mai Samakkee	บ้านใหม่สามัคคี
4	Ban La Phat	บ้านลำพาด
5	Ban Huai Bo Thong	บ้านห้วยบ่อทอง
6	Ban Hua Kao	บ้านหัวเขา
7	Ban Noen Suang	บ้านเนินสว่าง
8	Ban Thung Phra	บ้านทุ่งพระ
