= Wang Yang, Phitsanulok =

Wang Yang วังยาง
- Subdistrict
- Interactive map of Wang Yang
- Coordinates: 16.459°N 100.741°E
- District: Noen Maprang District
- Province: Phitsanulok
- Country: Thailand

Population (2005)
  - Total: 5,887
- Time zone: UTC+7 (ICT)
- Postal code: 65190
- Geocode: 650907

Wan Yang (Thai: วังยาง) is a sub-district in the Noen Maprang District of Phitsanulok Province, Thailand.

== Geography ==
The sub-district lies in the Nan Basin, which is part of the Chao Phraya Watershed.

== Administration ==
The following is a list of the sub-district's mubans (villages):

| No. | English | Thai |
| 1 | Ban Khlong Thakhian | บ้านคลองตะเคียน |
| 2 | Ban Sai Dong Yang | บ้านไทรดงยั้ง |
| 3 | Ban Wang Din Nieaw | บ้านวังดินเหนียว |
| 4 | Ban Nong Chalawan | บ้านหนองชาละวัน |
| 5 | Ban Thung Nadee | บ้านทุ่งนาดี |
| 6 | Ban Wang Yang | บ้านวังยาง |
| 7 | Ban Wang Yang Thai (South Ban Wang Yang) | บ้านวังยางใต้ |
