= Tha Chang, Phitsanulok =

Tha Chang ท่าช้าง (English: Elephant Dock)
- Tambon
- District: Phrom Phiram
- Province: Phitsanulok
- Country: Thailand

Population (2005)
  - Total: 9,506
- Time zone: UTC+7 (ICT)
- Postal code: 65150
- Geocode: 650602

Tha Chang (Thai: ท่าช้าง) is a subdistrict in the Phrom Phiram District of Phitsanulok Province, Thailand.

== Geography ==
Tha Chang lies in the Nan Basin, which is part of the Chao Phraya Watershed.

== Administration ==
The following is a list of the subdistrict's muban, which roughly correspond to villages:

No.	English	Thai
1	Ban Tha Mafueang	บ้านท่ามะเฟือง
2	Ban Tha Chang	บ้านท่าช้าง
3	Ban Nong Mo Kaeng	บ้านหนองหม้อแกง
4	Ban Khlong Khae Thawanthok (West Ban Khlong Khae)	บ้านคลองแคตะวันตก
5	Ban Khlong Khae (part)	บ้านคลองแค
6	Ban Wang Masra	บ้านวังมะสระ
7 & 8 (Note: A village with two mubans.)	Ban Na Kum	บ้านนาขุม
9 & 11 (Note: A village with two mubans.)	Ban Khlong Mem	บ้านคลองเมม
10	Ban Wang Kee Lek	บ้านวังขี้เหล็ก
12	Ban Mai Sam Ran	บ้านใหม่สำราญ
13	Ban Pa Mamuang	บ้านป่ามะม่วง

== Radio ==
- There is one radio station broadcast from Tambon Tha Chang, Siang Jaak Thahaan Reua (Sor. Thor. Ror. 8, Voice of the Navy). The frequency is 1170 AM.
