= Ban Noi Sum Khilek =

Ban Noi Sum Khilek บ้านน้อยซุ้มขี้เหล็ก (English: Small Copperpod Arch Village)
- Subdistrict
- Interactive map of Ban Noi Sum Khilek
- Coordinates: 16°27′00″N 100°35′00″E
- Country: Thailand
- Province: Phitsanulok
- District: Noen Maprang

Population (2005)
  - Total: 8,210
- Time zone: UTC+7 (ICT)
- Postal code: 65190
- Geocode: 650905

Ban Noi Sum Khilek (Thai: บ้านน้อยซุ้มขี้เหล็ก) is a subdistrict in the Noen Maprang District of Phitsanulok Province, Thailand.

== Geography ==
The subdistrict lies in the Nan Basin, which is part of the Chao Phraya Watershed.

== Administration ==
The following is a list of the subdistrict's mubans, which roughly correspond to villages:

No.	English	Thai
1	Ban Nong Mai Yang Dam	บ้านหนองไม้ยางดำ
2	Ban Noi	บ้านน้อย
3	Ban Prong Phai	บ้านโปร่งไผ่
4	Ban Sum Khilek	บ้านซุ้มขี้เหล็ก
5	Ban Phatana Dong Noi	บ้านพัฒนาดงน้อย
6	Ban Khlong Pak Nam	บ้านคลองปากน้ำ
7	Ban Pha Tha Phon	บ้านผาท่าพล
8	Ban Khlong Slaeng Mai	บ้านคลองแสลงใหม่
9	Ban Mai Jayrin Phon	บ้านใหม่เจริญพร
10	Ban Sanjao	บ้านศาลเจ้า
11	Ban Tawon Phatana	บ้านถาวรพัฒนา
