= Thothae =

Thothae ท้อแท้
- Tambon
- District: Wat Bot District
- Province: Phitsanulok
- Country: Thailand

Population (2005)
  - Total: 6,294
- Time zone: UTC+7 (ICT)
- Postal code: 65160
- Geocode: 650703

Thothae (Thai: ท้อแท้) is a sub-district in the Wat Bot District of Phitsanulok Province, Thailand.

== Name origin ==
The word thothae means 'tired', "weary", 'downhearted', or 'dejected'. It is formed from the two elements, tho (Thai: ท้อ) meaning 'discourage', and thae (Thai: แท้) meaning 'real' or 'genuine'.

According to local legend, the village is far from other villages, and the distance can make travellers weary. Despite the negative meaning, residents did not change the village name, only the Buddhist temple Wat Thothae (Thai: วัดท้อแท้) in Thothae was renamed Wat Thong Thae (Thai: วัดทองแท้; lit.: 'real golden temple').

== Geography ==
Thothae lies in the Nan Basin, which is part of the Chao Phraya Watershed.

== Administration ==
The sub-district is divided into eight smaller divisions called (muban), which roughly correspond to villages. There are six villages, two of which occupy several mubans. Thothae is administered by a tambon administrative organization (TAO). The mubans in Thotae are enumerated as follows:

No.	English	Thai
1&5	Ban Thothae	บ้านท้อแท้
2	Ban Tha Chang	บ้านท่าช้าง
3&4	Ban Lao Kwan	บ้านเหล่าขวัญ
6	Ban Dong Ga Bak	บ้านดงกะบาก
7	Ban Nong Makhang	บ้านหนองมะคัง
8	Ban Tha Gradun	บ้านท่ากระดุน

== Temples ==
The following is a list of active Buddhist temples in Thotae:

- วัดทองแท้ in Ban Thothae
- วัดคุ้งใหญ่ in Ban Thothae
- วัดเหล่าขวัญ in Ban Lao Kwang
- วัดนอก in Ban Lao Kwang
- วัดดงกระบาก in Ban Dong Ga Bak
- วัดสันติวนาราม in Ban Nong Makhang
