= Pibulsongkram Rajabhat University =

University in Thailand

Coordinates: 16°49′41″N 100°12′37″E

Logo of University

Pibulsongkram Rajabhat University (PSRU.) is a university in Phitsanulok Province, Thailand. The institute was upgraded to a university on 14 June 2004.

== History ==
The university was first established in 1926 as a teacher training school under the Royal Thai government's Primary School Act of 1921. King Rama VII bestowed the name Phitsanuwittayayon School and attended the opening on 7 January 1926, accompanied by Queen Ramphaiphanni. The school offered two years of training to Thai students who desired to become teachers in government schools.

A separate women's teacher training institution opened in 1933, and in 1956 both were combined to create Pibulsongkram Teachers College, named for then Prime Minister Field Marshal Plaek Phibunsongkhram. The teachers college began offering a bachelor of education degree in 1976. In 1981 it moved from its original sites on the Nan River to a new campus outside the city in Thung Thalaykaew.

The Education Act of 1984 allowed Pibulsongkram to offer degrees in other fields than education. On 14 February 1992 King Bhumibol Adulyadej (Rama IX) bestowed the new name of Rajabhat Institute Pibulsongkram. The institute was upgraded to a university on 14 June 2004 when the king gave his approval to the 2004 Rajabhat University Act.

== Faculties ==
The university offers degrees in six faculties: education, humanities and social science, management, industrial technology, science and technology, and agricultural technology.

- Faculty of Education
- Faculty of Management Science
- Faculty of Science and Technology
- Faculty of Food and Agricultural Technology
- Faculty of Industrial Technology
- Faculty of Humanities and Social Science
- College of Local Management and Development
- College of Nursing
- Graduate School
Faculties of Pibulsongkam University

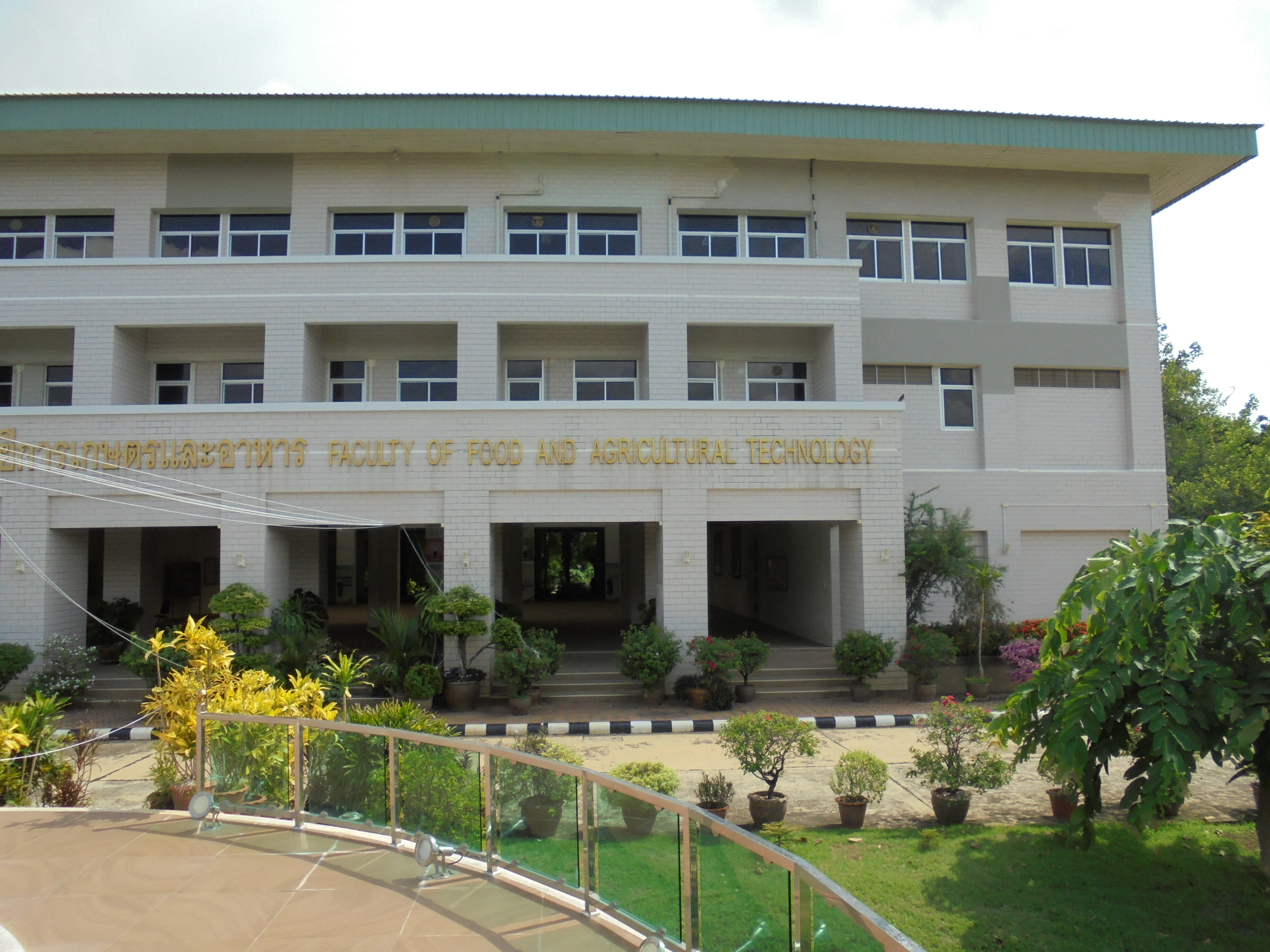
Faculty of Food and Agricultural Technology.

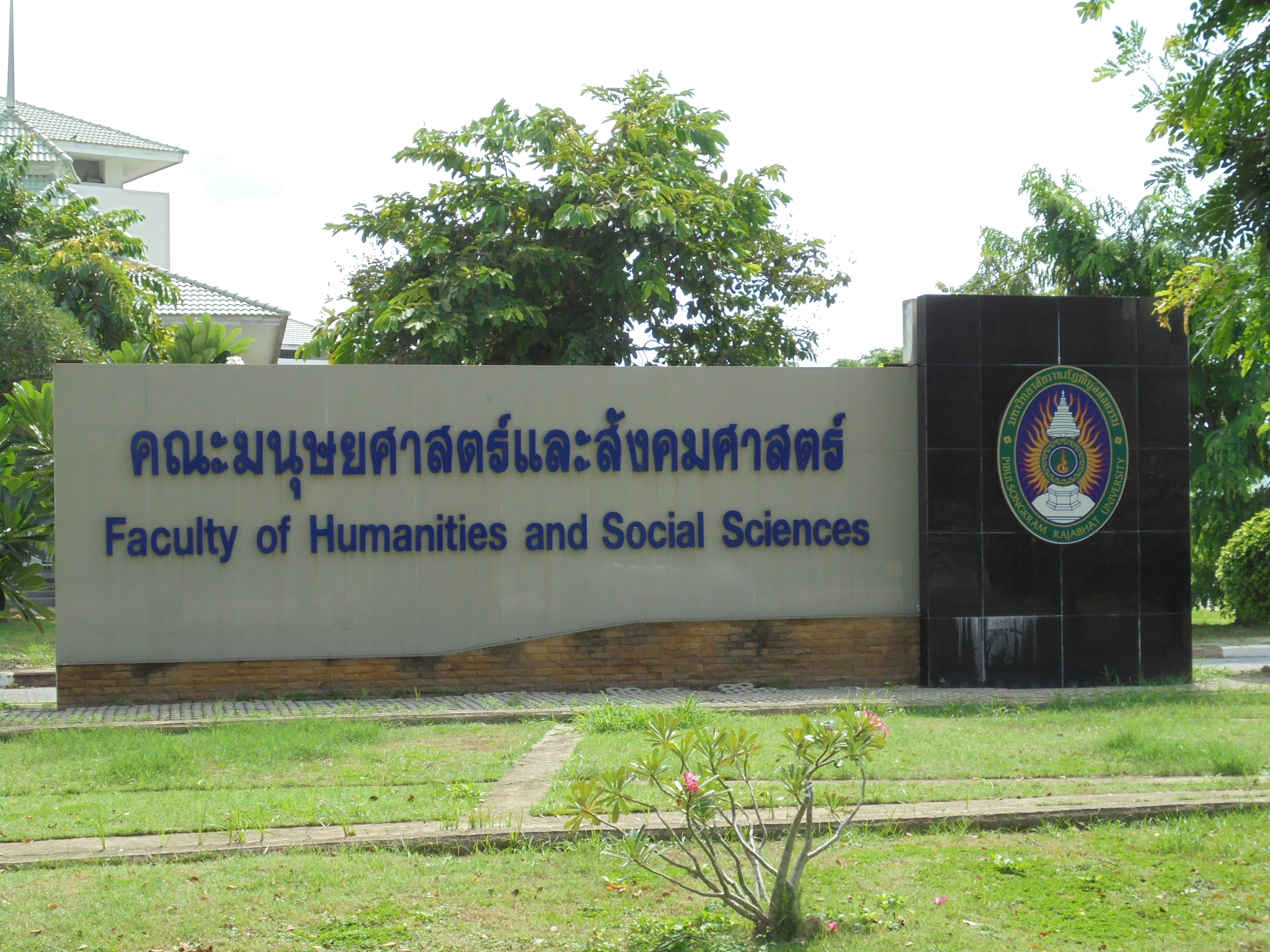
Faculty of Humanities and Social Science.

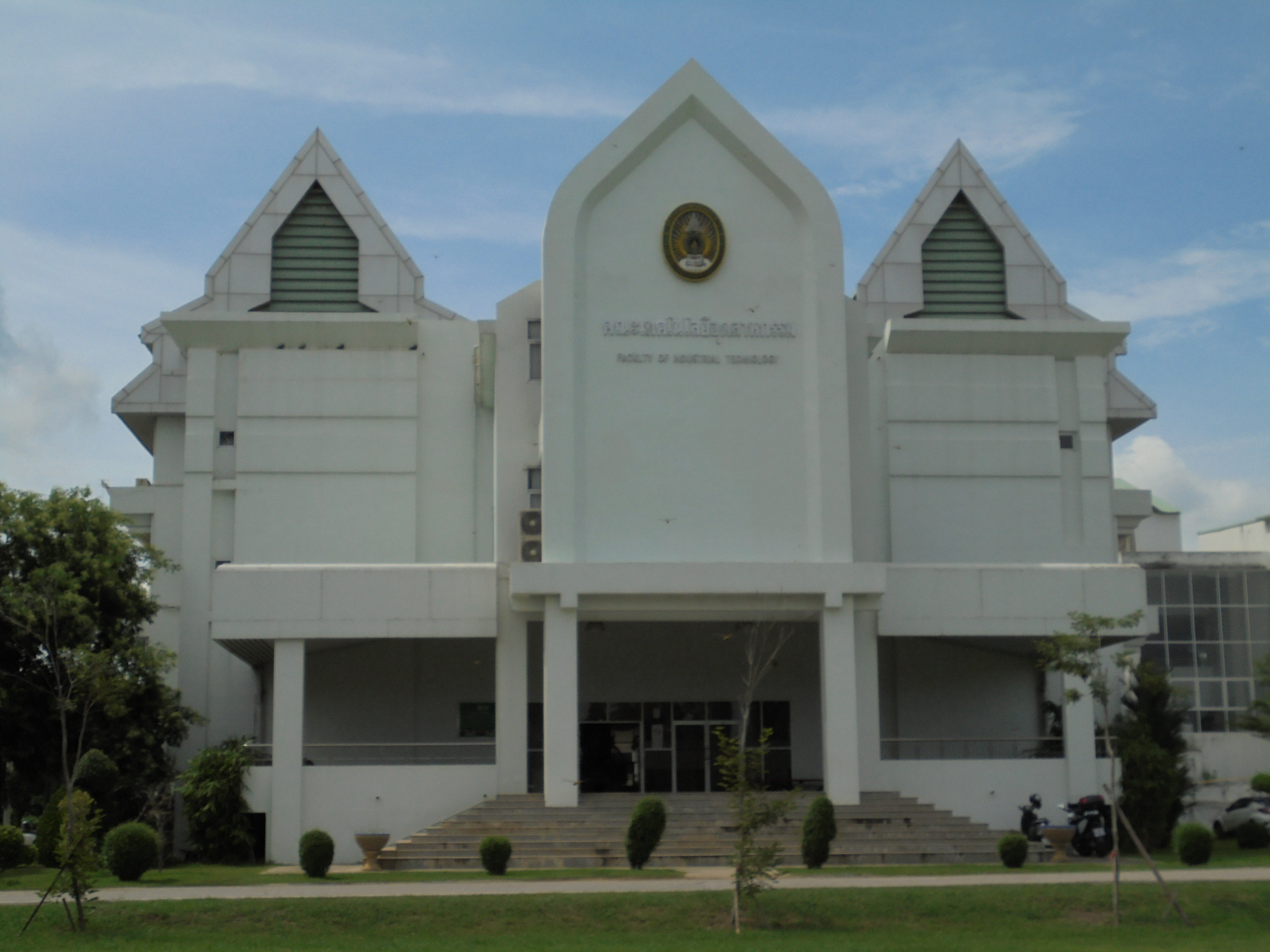
Faculty of Industrial Technology.

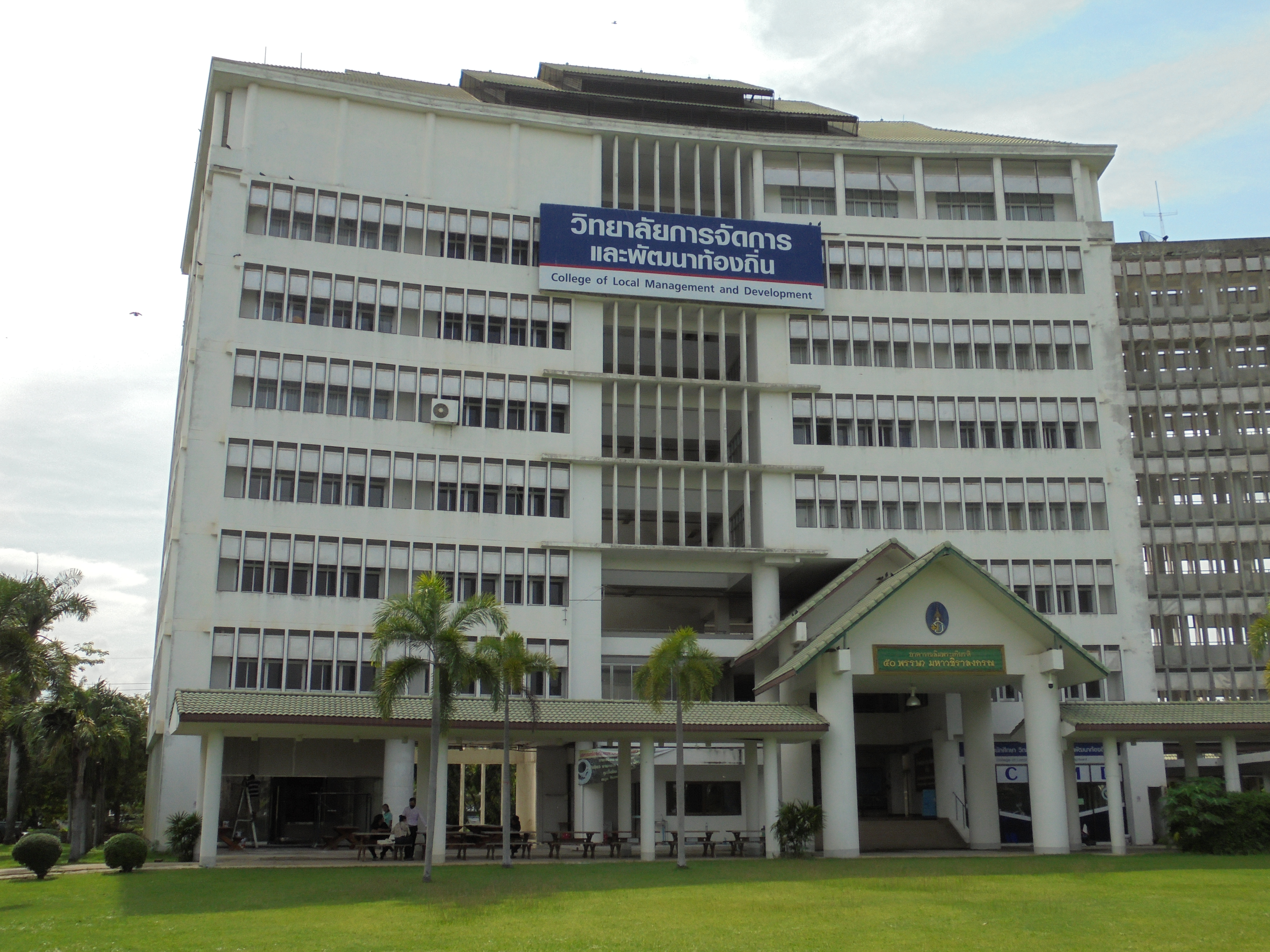
College of local Management and development.

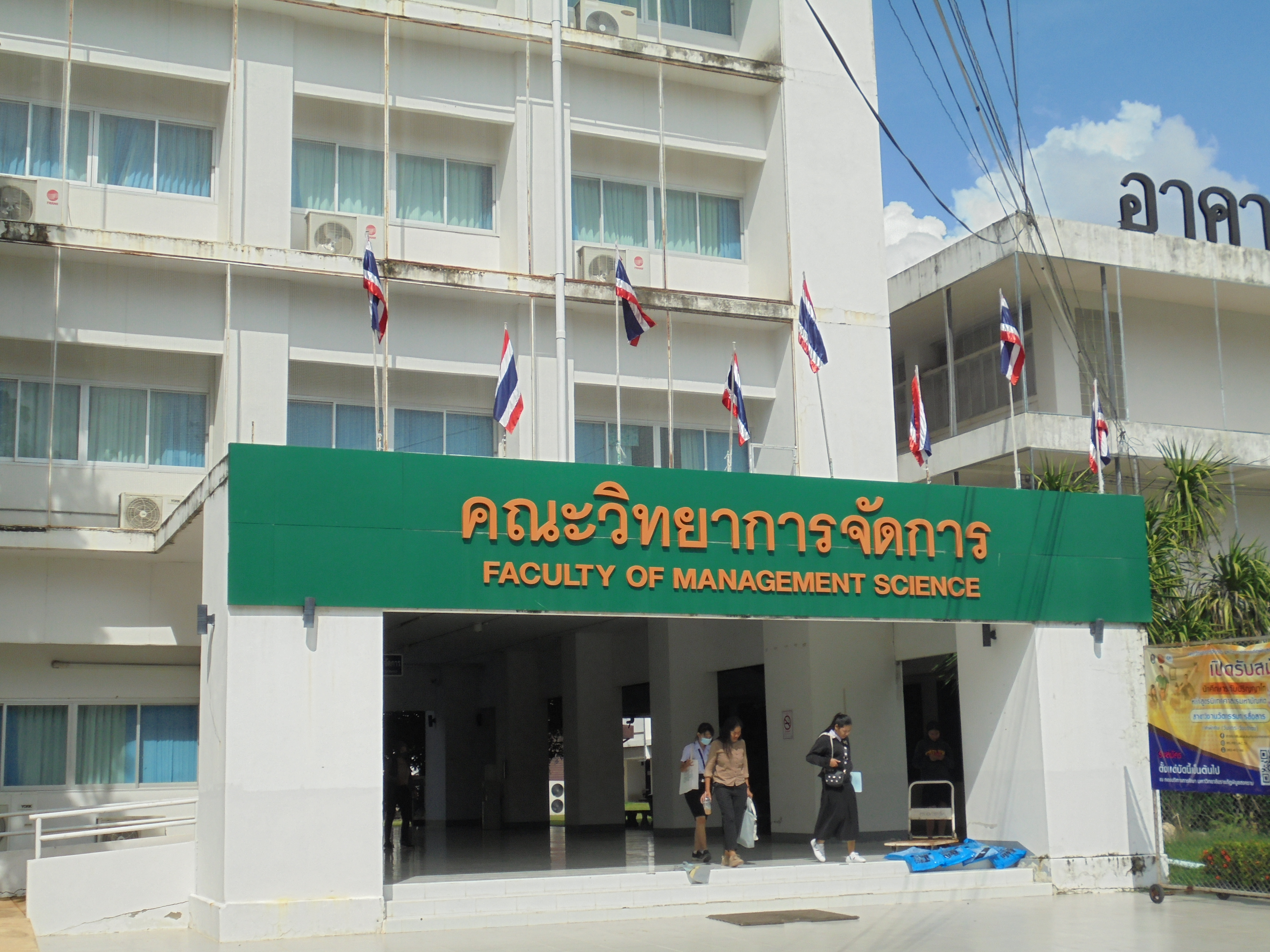
Faculty of Management Science.
