= Wang Phrong =

Wang Phrong วังโพรง
- Subdistrict
- Interactive map of Wang Phrong
- Coordinates: 16°25′00″N 100°40′00″E
- Country: Thailand
- Province: Phitsanulok
- District: Noen Maprang

Population (2005)
  - Total: 7,389
- Time zone: UTC+7 (ICT)
- Postal code: 65190
- Geocode: 650904

Wang Phrong (Thai: วังโพรง) is a sub-district in the Noen Maprang District of Phitsanulok Province, Thailand.

== Geography ==
The sub-district lies within the Nan Basin, which is part of the Chao Phraya Watershed.

== Administration ==
The following is a list of the sub-district's mubans, which roughly correspond to villages:

No.	English	Thai
1	Ban Thung Yao	บ้านทุ่งยาว
2	Ban Wang Kwan	บ้านวังขวัญ
3	Ban Nong Doo	บ้านหนองดู่
4	Ban Wang Phrong	บ้านวังโพรง
5	Ban Kao Kieaw	บ้านเขาเขียว
6	Ban Khlong Tha Lat	บ้านคลองตาลัด
7	Ban Wang Phrong Gao	บ้านวังโพรงเก่า
8	Ban Wang Gatha	บ้านวังกะทะ
9	Ban Nong Maduk	บ้านหนองมะดูก
