= Nong Khaem, Phitsanulok =

Coordinates: 17.05502°N 100.17742°E

Nong Khaem หนองแขม
- Tambon
- Interactive map of Nong Khaem
- District: Phrom Phiram
- Province: Phitsanulok
- Country: Thailand

Population (2005)
  - Total: 5,773
- Time zone: UTC+7 (ICT)
- Postal code: 65150
- Geocode: 650609

Nong Khaem (Thai: หนองแขม) is a sub-district in the Phrom Phiram District of Phitsanulok Province, Thailand.

== Geography ==
Nong Khaem lies in the Nan Basin, which is part of the Chao Phraya Watershed.

== Administration ==
The following is a list of the sub-district's muban, which roughly correspond to its villages:

No.	English	Thai
1	Ban Hua Dan	บ้านหัวดาน
2	Ban Dong Sano	บ้านดงสมอ
3 - 5	Ban Hat Yai	บ้านหาดใหญ่
6 - 7	Ban Nong Khaem	บ้านหนองแขม
8 & 10	Ban Khlong Tan	บ้านคลองตาล
9	Ban Wang Makam	บ้านวังมะขาม
