= Dong Prakham =

Dong Prakham ดงประคำ (English: String-of-Beads Forest)
- Tambon
- District: Phrom Phiram
- Province: Phitsanulok
- Country: Thailand

Population (2005)
  - Total: 8,305
- Time zone: UTC+7 (ICT)
- Postal code: 65150
- Geocode: 650612

Dong Prakham (Thai: ดงประคำ) is a subdistrict in the Phrom Phiram District of Phitsanulok Province, Thailand.

== Geography ==
Dong Prakham lies in the Nan Basin, which is part of the Chao Phraya Watershed.

== Administration ==
The following is a list of the subdistrict's muban, which roughly correspond to villages:

No.	English	Thai
1	Ban Khok Samo	บ้านโคกสมอ
2	Ban Khlong Thok	บ้านคลองตก
3	Ban Thong Phlong	บ้านท้องโพลง
4	Ban Pa Daeng	บ้านป่าแดง
5	Ban Kao Noi	บ้านเขาน้อย
6	Ban Thung Tha Priao	บ้านทุ่งตาเปรี้ยว
7	Ban Fak Bueng	บ้านฟากบึง
8	Ban Laem Thong	บ้านแหลมทอง
9	Ban Kao Prang	บ้านเขาปรัง
10	Ban Khlong Ai Kap	บ้านคลองอ้ายกาบ
11	Ban Thung Nam Sai	บ้านทุ่งน้ำใส
