= Taluk Thiam =

Taluk Thiam ตลุกเทียม
- Subdistrict
- District: Phrom Phiram
- Province: Phitsanulok
- Country: Thailand

Population (2005)
  - Total: 4,662
- Time zone: UTC+7 (ICT)
- Postal code: 65150
- Geocode: 650607

Taluk Thiam (Thai: ตลุกเทียม) is a subdistrict in the Phrom Phiram District of Phitsanulok Province, Thailand.

== Geography ==
Taluk Thiam lies in the Nan Basin, which is part of the Chao Phraya watershed.

== Administration ==
The following is a list of the subdistrict's mubans (villages):

No.	English	Thai
1 & 4 (Note: A village with two mubans.)	Ban Taluk Thiam	บ้านตลุกเทียม
2	Ban Tha Tham Nak	บ้านท่าตำหนัก
3	Ban Chiang Huai	บ้านเชิงหวาย
5	Ban Nong Phai	บ้านหนองไผ่
6	Ban Phraya Pan Daen	บ้านพระยาปันแดน
7	Ban Nong Sagae	บ้านหนองสะแก
8	Ban Bueng Tam	บ้านบึงธรรม
9	Ban Kom	บ้านขอม
