= Sai Yoi, Phitsanulok =

Sai Yoi ไทรย้อย (English: Weeping Banyan)
- Subdistrict
- Interactive map of Sai Yoi
- Coordinates: 16°25′00″N 100°36′00″E
- Country: Thailand
- Province: Phitsanulok
- District: Noen Maprang

Population (2005)
  - Total: 8,784
- Time zone: UTC+7 (ICT)
- Postal code: 65190
- Geocode: 650903

Sao Yoi (Thai: ไทรย้อย) is a sub-district in the Noen Maprang District of Phitsanulok Province, Thailand.

== Geography ==
The sub-district lies within the Nan Basin, which is part of the Chao Phraya Watershed.

== Administration ==
The following is a list of the sub-district's mubans, which roughly correspond to villages:

No.	English	Thai
1	Ban Phru Kradon	บ้านพรุกระโดน
2	Ban Nong Kamin	บ้านหนองขมิ้น
3	Ban Pha Rang Mee	บ้านผารังหมี
4	Ban Khok Wang San	บ้านโคกวังสาร
5	Ban Ka Din	บ้านเขาดิน
6	Ban Khok	บ้านโคก
7	Ban Pa Khai	บ้านป่าคาย
8	Ban Sai Yoi	บ้านไทรย้อย
9	Ban Wang Gaeng	บ้านวังแก่ง
10	Ban Noen Samran	บ้านเนินสำราญ
11	Ban Noen Makha	บ้านเนินมะค่า
12	Ban Khlong Sap Rang	บ้านคลองซับรัง
13	Ban Wang Nam Bo	บ้านวังน้ำบ่อ
14	Ban Kaeng Sai	บ้านแก่งทราย
15	Ban Nong Po	บ้านหนองปอ
16	Ban Nong Mathong	บ้านหนองมะต้อง
17	Ban Gaset Suk	บ้านเกษตรสุข
