= Chom Thong, Phitsanulok =

Coordinates: 16.8952°N 100.2236°E

Chom Thong จอมทอง
- Tambon
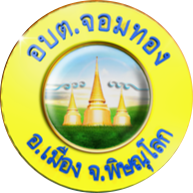
- Seal
- Interactive map of Chom Thong
- Country: Thailand
- Province: Phitsanulok
- District: Mueang Phitsanulok

Government
  - Type: Subdistrict Administrative Organization (SAO)

Area
  - Total: 35.8 km^{2} (13.8 sq mi)

Population (2025)
  - Total: 4,047
  - Density: 113/km^{2} (290/sq mi)
- Time zone: UTC+7 (ICT)
- Postal code: 65000
- Calling code: 055
- ISO 3166 code: TH-65011200
- LAO code: 06650112
- Website: www.jomtong.go.th

Chom Thong (Thai: จอมทอง) is a subdistrict in the Mueang Phitsanulok District of Phitsanulok Province, Thailand. In 2025, it had a population of 4,047 and 1,731 households. The economy of this subdistrict is mainly based on agriculture and fishery.

== Geography ==
The topography of Chom Thong subdistrict is completely flat fertile lowlands and is located in the lower northern part of Thailand. The subdistrict is bordered to the north by Phrom Phiram district, to the east by Pak Thok subdistrict, to the south by Ban Krang subdistrict and to the west by Phai Kho Don subdistrict. Chom Thong subdistrict lies in the Nan Basin, which is part of the Chao Phraya Watershed. The Nan river flows through the subdistrict. The Khwae Noi River flows on the boundary of Chom Thong and Pak Thok subdistricts and joins the Nan River. An irrigation canal (Huai Nong Khlong Bueng) flows from Phrom Phiram district through Chom Thong subdistrict and is an important water source for agricultural consumption and a raw water source to produce village water supply.

== History ==
People were digging for gold in the area of tree pagodas near the village called Ban Kra'om Thong (Thai: บ้านกระออมทอง). Later they changed the name to Ban Chom Thong.
On 16 December 1996 Ministry of Interior announced the establishment of Chom Thong Subdistrict Administrative Organization - SAO (ongkan borihan suan tambon). On 25 December 1996 it was published in Government Gazette, volume 113, section 52 Ngor.

== Administration ==
=== Provincial government ===
The administration of ฺChom Thong subdistrict (tambon) is responsible for an area that covers 22,380 rai ~ 35.8 square kilometres (13.8 sq mi) and consists of nine administrative villages (muban). As of 2025: 4,047 people and 1,731 households.

Chom Thong subdistrict with villages

Village	English	Thai	People	Households
Moo1	Ban Tha Takhian	บ้านท่าตะเคียน	621	279
Moo2	Ban Tha Takhian	บ้านท่าตะเคียน	213	93
Moo3	Ban Tha Takhian	บ้านท่าตะเคียน	416	175
Moo4	Ban Pak Thok	บ้านปากโทก	529	264
Moo5	Ban Chom Thong	บ้านจอมทอง	485	219
Moo6	Ban Chom Thong	บ้านจอมทอง	521	213
Moo7	Ban Chom Thong	บ้านจอมทอง	448	202
Moo8	Ban Tha Pho	บ้านท่าโพธิ์	664	226
Moo9	Ban Pho Thong	บ้านโพธิ์ทอง	150	60

=== Local government ===
Chom Thong Subdistrict Administrative Organization - Chom Thong SAO (Thai: องค์การบริหารตำบลจอมทอง, romanized: ongkan borihan suan tambon Chom Thong) covers the whole Chom Thong subdistrict.

== Temples ==
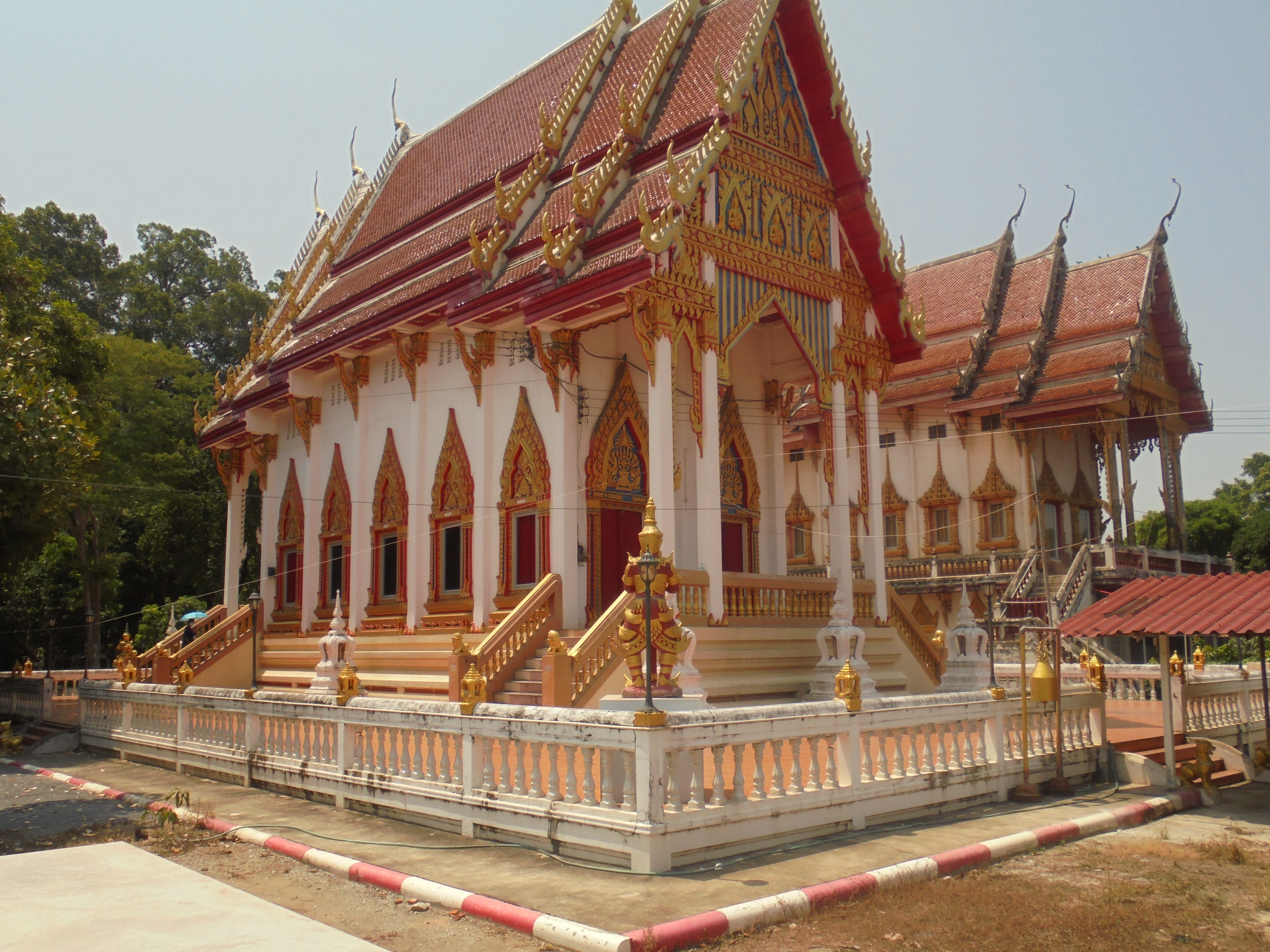
Ubosot of Wat Chom Thong

Chom Thong subdistrict is home to the following active temples, where Theravada Buddhism is practised by local residents:

Temple name	Thai	Location
Wat Tha Takhian	วัดท่าตะเคียน	Moo3
Wat Koh Kaew	วัดเกาะแก้ว	Moo4
Wat Sala Sung	วัดศาลาสูง	Moo4
Wat Chom Thong	วัดจอมทอง	Moo5

== Economy ==
Of the population 80% are engaged in agriculture (farming), include rice and fruit, and fishery. The fruits that are planted are Burmese grape, coconut, jackfruit, Mango plum, pomelo, sapodilla, etc.

== Education ==
The following schools are located in Chom Thong subdistrict.

- Wat Tha Takhian school - Moo3
- Wat Chom Thong school - Moo5

== Healthcare ==
There are Chom Thong health-promoting hospitals in Moo2 and Moo5.

== Transport ==
- Highway 12, Phitsanulok-Sukhothai route
- Highway 126, Phitsanulok bypass road
- National road 1086, Phitsanulok-Wat Bot/Phrom Phiram route

== Electricity ==
All households in Chom Thong subdistrict have access to the electricity grid of Provincial Electricity Authority (PEA).

== Waterworks ==
Of Chom Thong subdistrict 1,500 households, out of a total of 1,641 households, have access to the water network of Provincial Waterworks Authority (PWA). All households have access to the village water supply system in every village.

== Communications ==
All households in Chom Thong subdistrict have access to the mobile telephone network. Of the fixed telephone only six villages have access (village 1, 2, 3, 5, 6 and 8) and three don't (village 4, 7 and 9).
