= Si Phirom =

Sri Phirom ศรีภิรมย์
- Subdistrict
- District: Phrom Phiram District
- Province: Phitsanulok
- Country: Thailand

Population (2005)
  - Total: 7,777
- Time zone: UTC+7 (ICT)
- Postal code: 65150
- Geocode: 650606

Sri Phirom (Thai: ศรีภิรมย์) is a sub-district in the Phrom Phiram District of Phitsanulok Province, Thailand.

== Geography ==
Sri Phirom lies in the Nan Basin, which is part of the Chao Phraya watershed.

== Administration ==
The following is a list of the sub-district's mubans (villages):

No.	English	Thai
1	Ban Tha Thong	บ้านท่าทอง
2	Ban Tha Ngam	บ้านท่าง่าม
3	Ban Song	บ้านซ่อง
4	Ban Thong Khung	บ้านท้องคุ้ง
5	Ban Bung	บ้านบุ่ง
6	Ban Huai	บ้านห้วย
7	Ban Khong Magluea	บ้านคลองมะเกลือ
8	Ban Bueng Pla Nao	บ้านบึงปลาเน่า
9	Ban Khlong Mapaelop	บ้านคลองมะแพลบ
10	Ban Bueng Tham Rong	บ้านบึงธรรมโรง
11	Ban Khlong Huai Chan	บ้านคลองห้วยชัน
12	Ban Chai Phattana	บ้านชัยพัฒนา
