= Matum =

Matum มะตูม
- Subdistrict
- District: Phrom Phiram
- Province: Phitsanulok
- Country: Thailand

Population (2005)
  - Total: 4,046
- Time zone: UTC+7 (ICT)
- Postal code: 65150
- Geocode: 650604
- Chief roadway: Route 12

Matum (Thai: มะตูม) is a sub-district in the Phrom Phiram District of Phitsanulok Province, Thailand. Matum is the Thai word for bael.

== Geography ==
Matum lies in the Nan Basin, which is part of the Chao Phraya watershed.

== Administration ==
The following is a list of the sub-district's mubans (villages):

No.	English	Thai
1	Ban Matum	บ้านมะตูม
2	Ban Tha Chai	บ้านท่าไชย
3 - 4	Ban Phai Ko Nam	บ้านไผ่ขอน้ำ
5	Ban Wang Pla Duk	บ้านวังปลาดุก
6	Ban Laem Lat	บ้านแหลมลาด
