= Thap Yai Chiang =

Coordinates: 17°07′N 100°17′E

Thap Yai Chiang ทับยายเชียง
- Tambon
- Interactive map of Thap Yai Chiang
- District: Phrom Phiram
- Province: Phitsanulok
- Country: Thailand

Population (2005)
  - Total: 5,551
- Time zone: UTC+7 (ICT)
- Postal code: 65150
- Geocode: 650611

Thap Yai Chiang (Thai: ทับยายเชียง) is a subdistrict in the Phrom Phiram District of Phitsanulok Province, Thailand.

== Geography ==
Thap Yai Chiang lies in the Nan Basin, which is part of the Chao Phraya Watershed.

== Administration ==
The following is a list of the subdistrict's muban, which roughly correspond to villages:

No.	English	Thai
1	Ban Sai Ngam	บ้านไทรงาม
2	Ban Si Charoen	บ้านศรีเจริญ
3	Ban Rai	บ้านไร่
4	Ban Nong Makhang	บ้านหนองมะคัง
5	Ban Thap Yai Chiang	บ้านทับยายเชียง
6	Ban Ka Nam Sut	บ้านเขาน้ำสุด
