= Wang Won subdistrict =

Wang Won วังวน (English: Whirlpool)
- Tambon
- Interactive map of Wang Won
- District: Phrom Phiram
- Province: Phitsanulok
- Country: Thailand

Population (2005)
  - Total: 3,783
- Time zone: UTC+7 (ICT)
- Postal code: 65150
- Geocode: 650608

Wang Won (Thai: วังวน) is a tambon (sub-district) in the Phrom Phiram District of Phitsanulok Province, Thailand.

== Geography ==
Wang Won lies in the Nan Basin, which is part of the Chao Phraya Watershed.

== Administration ==
The following is a list of the sub-district's muban, which roughly correspond to the villages:

No.	English	Thai
1	Ban Wang Won	บ้านวังวน
2	Ban Glang	บ้านกลาง
3	Ban Nong Hang	บ้านหนองห้าง
4	Ban Wang Sathue	บ้านวังสะตือ
5	Ban Dong Magrut	บ้านดงมะกรูด
6	Ban Khlong Tha Niap	บ้านคลองทำเนียบ
7	Ban Wang Nam Bo	บ้านวังน้ำบ่อ
8 & 10	Ban Wang Mai Gaen	บ้านวังไม้แก่น
9	Ban Nong Tan	บ้านหนองถ่าน
