= Noen Maprang subdistrict =

Noen Maprang เนินมะปราง (English: Marian-Plum Hill)
- Subdistrict
- Interactive map of Noen Maprang
- Coordinates: 16°34′00″N 100°38′00″E
- Country: Thailand
- Province: Phitsanulok
- District: Noen Maprang

Population (2005)
  - Total: 8,209
- Time zone: UTC+7 (ICT)
- Postal code: 65190
- Geocode: 650906

Noen Maprang (Thai: เนินมะปราง) is a subdistrict in the Noen Maprang District of Phitsanulok Province, Thailand.

== Geography ==
The subdistrict lies within the Nan Basin, which is part of the Chao Phraya Watershed.

== Administration ==
The following is a list of the subdistrict's mubans, which roughly correspond to villages:

No.	English	Thai
1	Ban Mai Thong Prasayrit	บ้านใหม่ทองประเสริฐ
2	Ban Noen Maprang	บ้านเนินมะปราง
3	Ban Nong Kon (part)	บ้านหนองขอน
4	Ban Noen Gabak	บ้านเนินกะบาก
5	Ban Noen Din	บ้านเนินดิน
6	Ban Na	บ้านนา
7	Ban Dong Ngoo (part)	บ้านดงงู
8	Ban Dong Ngoo Mai (New Ban Dong Ngoo)	บ้านดงงูใหม่
9	Ban Nong Kon Nuea (North Ban Nong Kon)	บ้านหนองขอนใต้
