= Phrom Phiram subdistrict =

Coordinates: 17°02′N 100°12′E

Phrom Phiram พรหมพิราม (English: Beautiful Brahma)
- Tambon
- Interactive map of Phrom Phiram
- District: Phrom Phiram
- Province: Phitsanulok
- Country: Thailand

Population (2005)
  - Total: 15,075
- Time zone: UTC+7 (ICT)
- Postal code: 65150
- Geocode: 650601

Phrom Phiram (Thai: พรหมพิราม) is a subdistrict in the Phrom Phiram district of Phitsanulok province, Thailand.

== Geography ==
Phrom Phiram lies in the Nan Basin, which is part of the Chao Phraya Watershed.

== Administration ==
No.	English	Thai
1 - 2	Ban Phrom Phiram	บ้านพรหมพิราม
3	Ban Saphan Hin	บ้านสะพานหิน
4	Ban Grap Phuang Thai (South Ban Grap Phuang)	บ้านกรับพวงใต้
5	Ban Grap Phuang Glang (Central Ban Grap Phuang)	บ้านกรับพวงกลาง
6	Ban Grap Phuang Nuea (North Ban Grap Phuang)	บ้านกรับพวงเหนือ
7	Ban Khung Tao Lao	บ้านคุ้งเตาเหล้า
8 - 9	Ban Yan Kat	บ้านย่านขาด
10	Ban Huai Dang	บ้านห้วยดั้ง
11	Ban Wang Namyen	บ้านวังน้ำเย็น
12	Ban Ganjana	บ้านกาญจนา
13	Ban Huai Dang Mai (New Bang Huai Dang)	บ้านห้วยดั้งใหม่
14	Ban Saphan Hin	บ้านสะพานหิน
15	Ban Thung San	บ้านทุ่งสาน
