= Noen Maprang district =

Noen Maprang เนินมะปราง
- District
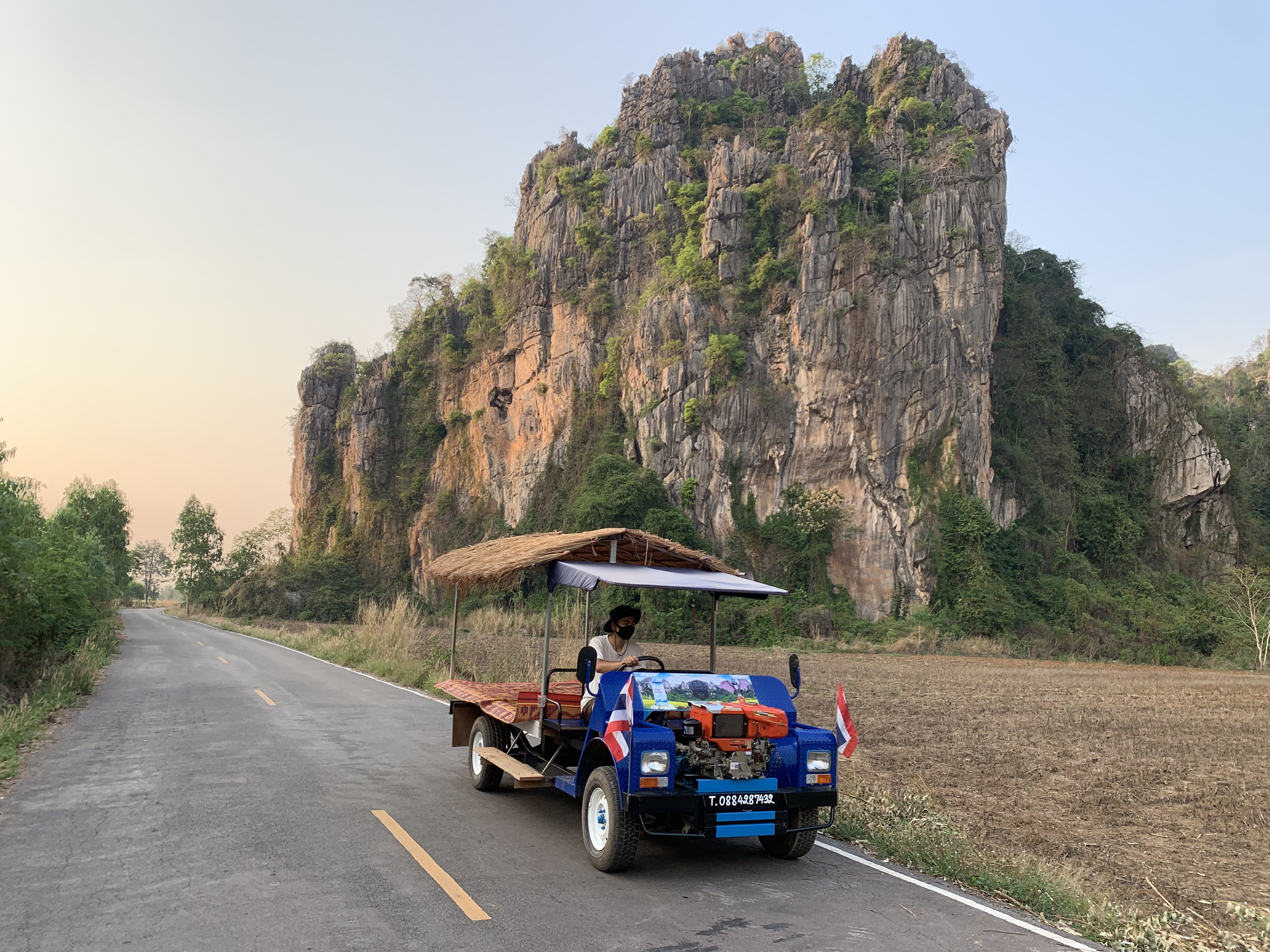
- A limestone karst in Ban Mung, Noen Maprang

- District location in Phitsanulok province
- Coordinates: 16°34′6″N 100°38′8″E
- Country: Thailand
- Province: Phitsanulok

Area
  - Total: 1,029.5 km^{2} (397.5 sq mi)

Population (2025)
  - Total: 56,083
  - Density: 54/km^{2} (140/sq mi)
- Time zone: UTC+7 (ICT)
- Postcode: 65190
- Calling code: 055
- ISO 3166 code: TH-6509
- LAO code: 01650901

Noen Maprang (Thai: เนินมะปราง, pronounced [nɤ̄ːn má(ʔ).prāːŋ]) is the southernmost district (amphoe) of Phitsanulok province, lower northern region of Thailand.

== History ==
To better cope with the problems caused by communist insurgents in northern Thailand in the 1970s, the government separated Tambon Noen Maprang from Wang Thong district to create a minor district (king amphoe) on 6 September 1976. It was upgraded to a full district on 1 April 1983.

== Toponymy ==
The district name means "the beautiful city of Brahma".

== Geography ==
Neighboring districts are (from the north clockwise) Wang Thong of Phitsanulok Province, Khao Kho, Mueang Phetchabun, and Wang Pong of Phetchabun province, Thap Khlo, Wang Sai Phun, and Sak Lek of Phichit province.

Noen Maprang lies within the Nan Basin, which is part of the Chao Phraya Watershed. Within the district is the source of the Chomphu River. The Ban Mung (Thai: คลองบ้านมุง) and Sai Yoi (คลองไทรย้อย) Rivers also flow through the district.

== Administration ==
=== Provincial government ===
The district is divided into seven subdistricts (tambons), which are further subdivided into 77 villages (mubans), as of 2025: 56,083 people of 23,483 families.

No	Subdistrict	Population	Villages
1	Chomphu	12,888	15
2	Ban Mung	6,810	8
3	Sai Yoi	8,201	17
4	Wang Phrong	6,865	9
5	Ban Noi Sum Khilek	7,717	12
6	Noen Maprang	8,012	9
6	Wang Yang	5,590	7
	Total population	56,083	77

=== Local government ===
There are three subdistrict municipalities (thesaban tambon). Noen Maprang municipality covers parts of villages 2, 4, 6 of Noen Maprang subdistrict. Ban Mung and Sai Yoi municipalities cover the whole Ban Mung and Sai Yoi subdistricts.

Subdistrict municipality	Population
Sai Yoi subdistrict municipality	8,201
Ban Mung subdistrict municipality	6,810
Noen Maprang subdistrict municipality	3,369

Further there are five subdistrict administrative organizations (SAO). Noen Maprang SAO covers the remaining area of Noen Maprang subdistrict. The other four SAO's cover the whole same-named subdistrict.
