= Ho Klong =

Ho Klong หอกลอง
- Subdistrict
- Interactive map of Ho Klong
- Coordinates: 16°57′39″N 100°13′57″E
- District: Phrom Phiram
- Province: Phitsanulok
- Country: Thailand

Population (2016)
  - Total: 4,751
- Time zone: UTC+7 (ICT)
- Postal code: 65150
- Geocode: 650605

Ho Klong (Thai: หอกลอง) is a subdistrict in the Phrom Phiram District of Phitsanulok Province, Thailand. In 2016, it had a population of 4,751 people.

== Geography ==
Ho Klong lies in the Nan Basin, which is part of the Chao Phraya watershed.

== Administration ==
=== Central administration ===
The tambon is divided into seven administrative villages (mubans) (villages).

No.	English	Thai
1	Ban Ho Klong	บ้านหอกลอง
2	Ban Grabang	บ้านกระบัง
3	Ban Pak Khlong	บ้านปากคลอง
4	Ban Bang Yee Thum	บ้านบางยี่ทุ่ม
5 & 7	Ban Prong Nok	บ้านโปร่งนก
6	Ban Mai Ho Klong	บ้านใหม่หอกลอง

=== Local administration ===
The subdistrict is covered by the subdistrict administrative organization (SAO) Ho Klong (องค์การบริหารส่วนตำบลหอกลอง).

== Extertnal links ==
- Thaitambon.com on Ho Klong
