= Matong subdistrict =

Matong มะต้อง
- Tambon
- District: Phrom Phiram
- Province: Phitsanulok
- Country: Thailand

Population (2005)
  - Total: 9,301
- Time zone: UTC+7 (ICT)
- Postal code: 65150
- Geocode: 650610

Matong (Thai: มะต้อง) is a sub-district in the Phrom Phiram District of Phitsanulok Province, Thailand.

== Geography ==
Matong lies in the Nan Basin, which is part of the Chao Phraya watershed.

== Administration ==
The following is a list of the sub-district's muban, which roughly correspond to villages:

No.	English	Thai
1 - 3	Ban Matong	บ้านมะต้อง
4	Ban Hang Lai	บ้านหางไหล
5	Ban Phai Tam	บ้านไผ่ถ้ำ
6	Ban Thai Yang	บ้านท้ายยาง
7	Ban Tha Sam Rong	บ้านท่าสำโรง
8	Ban Pa Sak	บ้านป่าสัก
9	Ban Sam Si Charoen	บ้านสามศรีเจริญ
10	Ban Pak Khlong Chalong	บ้านปากคลองฉลอง
11	Ban Khlong Khla	บ้านคลองคล้า
12	Ban Thot Phon	บ้านทศพล
