= Phrom Phiram district =

Phrom Phiram พรหมพิราม
- District
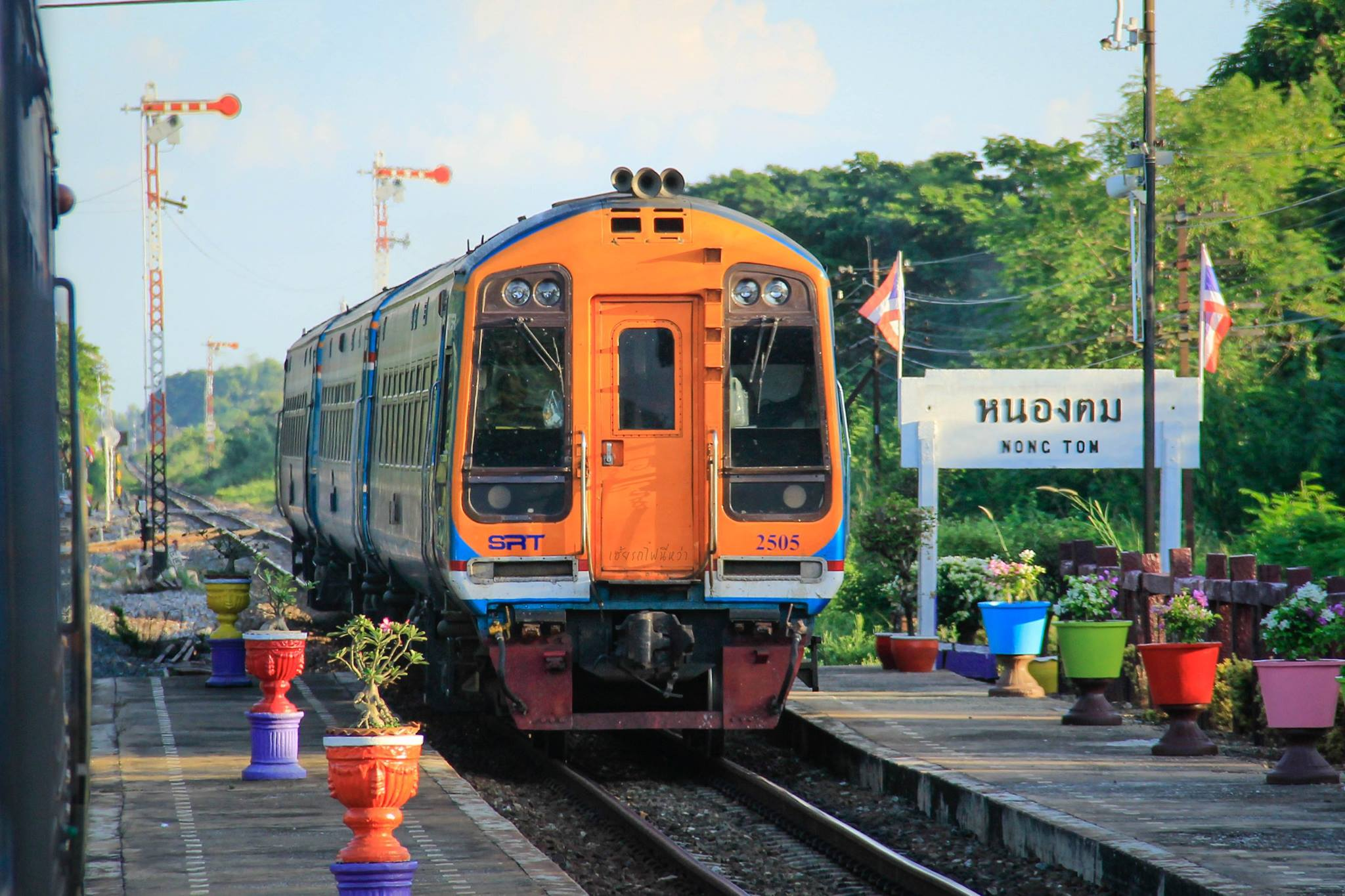
- Nong Tom railway station

- District location in Phitsanulok province
- Coordinates: 17°2′0″N 100°12′7″E
- Country: Thailand
- Province: Phitsanulok
- Seat: Phrom Phiram

Area
  - Total: 832.6 km^{2} (321.5 sq mi)

Population (2025)
  - Total: 82,667
  - Density: 99/km^{2} (260/sq mi)
- Time zone: UTC+7 (ICT)
- Postcode: 65150
- Calling code: 055
- ISO 3166 code: TH-6506
- LAO code: 01650601

Phrom Phiram (Thai: พรหมพิราม, pronounced [pʰrōm pʰí.rāːm]) is a district (amphoe) in the northwestern part of Phitsanulok province, lower northern region of Thailand. The district name means "the beautiful city of Brahma".

== History ==
In 1972 historians explored the old city area of Mueang Phrom Phiram. They found remains of the city wall, Chedi basements and Sukhothai Celadon on Phra Ruang Road from Sukhothai in Tambon Si Phirom and Dong Prakham. As that road continues eastward to Wat Bot and Nakhon Thai, the historians assumed it was the road for transportation between Sukhothai and Bang Yang.

Also King Trailokanat moved his troops passing Phrom Phiram to Phichai for the war with King Tilokaraj of Lanna.

The old location of Phrom Phiram was in Tambon Matum. It was created as Phrom Phiram District in 1895. The district office was moved to the right bank of the Nan River at Ban Yan Khat around 1950. When the government built the northern railway passing by Phrom Phiram District, the district office was then moved to Ban Krap Phuang (now named Ban Phrom Phiram), 500m from Phrom Phiram railway station. The district office was renovated in 1960. The present office was opened in 1976.

== Geography ==
Neighboring districts are (from the east clockwise), Wat Bot, Mueang Phitsanulok, and Bang Rakam of Phitsanulok Province; Kong Krailat, Mueang Sukhothai, Si Samrong, and Sawankhalok of Sukhothai province: and Phichai of Uttaradit province.

Phrom Phiram lies within the Nan Basin, which is part of the Chao Phraya Watershed. The important water resource is the Nan River. The Khwae Noi River flows into the Nan within Phrom Phiram.

== Administration ==
=== Provincial government ===
The district is divided into twelve subdistricts (tambons), which are further subdivided into 123 villages (mubans), as of 2025: 82,667 people of 34,120 families.

No	Subdistrict	Population	Villages
1	Phrom Phiram	13,653	15
2	Tha Chang	8,764	13
3	Wong Khong	9,317	11
4	Matum	3,911	6
5	Ho Klong	4,589	7
6	Si Phirom	7,100	13
7	Taluk Thiam	4,525	9
8	Wang Won	3,308	10
9	Nong Khaem	5,328	10
10	Matong	8,529	12
11	Thap Yai Chiang	5,371	6
12	Dong Prakham	8,272	11
	Total population	82,667	123

=== Local government ===
There are four subdistrict municipalities (thesaban tambons). Phrom Phiram municipality covers parts of village 1, 2 and 12 and Mueang Phrom Phiram municipality is responsible for the remaining area of the Phrom Phiram subdistrict. Wong Khong municipality covers village 1 and 6 of Wong Khong and village 6 of Matong subdistricts. Ho Klong municipality covers the whole Ho Klong subdistrict.

Subdistrict municipality	Population
Mueang Phrom Phiram	12,557
Ho Klong	4,589
Phrom Phiram	1,096

Wong Khong subdist. mun.	Population
Wong Khong subdistrict	2,895
Matong subdistrict	42
Total Population	2,937

Further there are ten subdistrict administrative organizations (SAO). Wong Khong SAO covers the remaining area of Wong Khong subdistrct. But the other nine SAO's cover the whole same-named subdistrict.

== Infrastructure ==
=== Significant settlements ===
Of the numerous villages in Phrom Phiram District, those that occupy several mubans are as follows:

- Ban Phrom Phiram
- Ban Sapan Hin
- Ban Grap Puang
- Ban Yan Kat
- Ban Huay Dang
- Ban Mathong
- Ban Khlong Khae
- Ban Na Kum
- Ban Khlong Mem
- Ban Phai Ko Nam
- Ban Wong Khong
- Ban Yan Yao
- Ban Hat Yai
- Ban Nong Khaem
- Ban Khlong Than
- Ban Wang Mai Gaen
- Ban Taluk Thiam

=== Radio ===
- There is one radio station broadcast from Tambon Tha Chang, Siang Jaak Thahaan Reua (Sor. Thor. Ror. 8, Voice of the Navy). The frequency is 1170 AM.

== Flooding ==
In 2006, there were reported cases of leptospirosis among residents of Phrom Phiram, contracted due to the amount of standing water.

== See also ==
- Phrom Phiram murder case
