= Wat Bot subdistrict, Phitsanulok =

Wat Bot วัดโบสถ์
- Tambon
- Interactive map of Wat Bot
- Coordinates: 17.0055°N 100.3219°E
- District: Wat Bot
- Province: Phitsanulok
- Country: Thailand

Population (2005)
  - Total: 7,978
- Time zone: UTC+7 (ICT)
- Postal code: 65160
- Geocode: 650701

Wat Bot (Thai: วัดโบสถ์) is a subdistrict in the Wat Bot district of Phitsanulok province, Thailand.

== Geography ==
Wat Bot lies in the Nan Basin, which is part of the Chao Phraya Watershed.

== Administration ==
The subdistrict is divided into 10 smaller divisions called (muban), which roughly correspond to villages of Wat Bot. There are six villages, several of which occupy more than one muban. Wat Bot is administrated by a Tambon administrative organization (TAO). The mubans in Wat Bot are enumerated as follows:

No.	English	Thai
1-2	Ban Tha Ngam	บ้านท่างาม
3-4 & 7	Ban Wat Bot	บ้านวัดโบสถ์
5	Ban Khlong Chang (part)	บ้านคลองช้าง
6	Ban Noen Makhuet	บ้านเนินมะคึด
8	Ban Wang Grang	บ้านวังกร่าง
9	Ban Nong Kon	บ้านหนองขอน
10	Ban Khlong Chang Mai (New Ban Khlong Chang)	บ้านคลองช้างใหม่

== Temples ==
The following is a list of active Buddhist temples in Tambon Wat Bot:

- วัดท่างาม in Ban Tha Ngam
- วัดช่างเหล็ก in Ban Wat Bot
- วัดบัวหลวง in Ban Wat Bot
- วัดโบสถ์ in Ban Wat Bot
- วัดคลองช้าง in Ban Khlong Chang
- วัดบ้านเนินมะคึก in Ban Noen Makhuet
- วัดหนองขอน in Ban Nong Kon
