= History of Phitsanulok province =

Historical affiliations

Dvaravati network 6th–11th centuries
Angkorian influence 12th–13 centuries
Kingdom of Sukhothai 1238 – 1463
Kingdom of Ayutthaya 1463–1767
Kingdom of Thonburi 1767–1782
Kingdom of Siam 1782–1932
Kingdom of Thailand 1932–present

The lands situated in the present-day Phitsanulok Province of Thailand have been inhabited since the Stone Age. The Neolithic inhabitants are not likely to have been ancestors of the modern Thai people who live there now. The earliest historical records relating to what is now Phitsanulok Province indicates that at a time prior to or during the 11th century, the present-day city of Phitsanulok was a small strategic settlement known as Song Khwae. During the next century, in 1188, Nakhon Thai, located near the center of the present Phitsanulok Province, was established as the capital city of the Singhanavati Kingdom, an early city-state of Thailand.

Later, during Thailand's Sukhothai Period, the city of Phitsanulok emerged as a major city in the east of the Sukhothai Kingdom, and the great temples of Wat Chula Manee, Wat Aranyik and Wat Chedi Yod Thong were constructed. In 1357, the renowned Wat Phra Sri Rattana Mahathat was erected, and the Ayutthaya Period witnessed the construction of several of the province's other chief temples. Phitsanulok served for 25 years as the capital city of the Ayutthaya Kingdom. In 1555, King Naresuan the Great was born in the city of Phitsanulok. Naresuan played a significant role in the history of Thailand, as he expanded the kingdom (then called Siam) to its greatest territorial extent, by conquering sizable portions of modern-day Burma and Cambodia. In recent times, Phitsanulok Province has become an important agricultural center, part of the Bread Basket of Thailand, providing rice and other crops to consumers in Thailand and throughout the world. Extensive agricultural development over the last hundred years or so has spawned a modern infrastructure in the urban areas of the province, bringing with it an array of modern roads, universities, hospitals and other conveniences. Over the years, the Nan River and its tributaries have played a substantial role in the history and development of the region by providing a route for transportation, fertile soil for agriculture, and water for irrigation. The river waters have also served as a route for enemy invaders, and have been the source of periodic widespread flooding throughout the province.

== Prehistoric era ==
Phitsanulok Province was inhabited during the Stone Age, as many stone axes have been found in the area indicative of the time period. However, these early hunter-gatherers are not likely to be ancestors of the Thai who now inhabit the Phitsanulok Province. The human population around Phitsanulok Province remained sparse until late in the region's history. The settlement of the indigenous populations of the region began around the advent of rice agriculture during the Bronze Age, and continued through the Iron Age. Archaeologists suspect that Mon-Khmer speaking tribes spread through the region, bringing rice agriculture, metalworking, domestic animals. The main course of migration during the metal ages probably ran along the coast of Thailand, but migrants also traveled inland along the Chao Phraya to the Nan Basin and other areas, where it was relatively easier to establish settlements. The next major wave of migration into the province came not from the coast along the Chao Phraya, but rather from the mountainous areas of northern Thailand. These migrants were the Tai. Their course of immigration probably began south of the Yangzi River. As the Han Chinese spread south of the Yangzi around the sixth century BC, the ancestors of the Thai retreated into the high valleys and, over many centuries, migrated west along an arc from the Guangxi to the Brahmaputra Valley. The Thai brought rice-farming expertise to the mountainous areas of Northern Thailand, and eventually to the Nan Basin and the other lowland regions of Thailand. Some of the Nan River Mon-Khmer retreated into the hills as the Thai expansion continued, while others generally adopted dialects of the Tai languages and blended into the culture of the new settlers. The Tai language spoken in Phitsanulok (and most of modern Thailand) was heavily influenced by the Khmer culture as well, and evolved into the language we now call Thai, which is considerably different from other Tai dialects. Even after this Thai migration, the population in present-day Phitsanulok Province, other than along the banks of the Nan River was sparse. Predator animal species, as well as malaria, tropical temperatures and other hardships, kept the population from expanding far from the river, despite the region's extremely fertile soil.

== Song Khwae ==
During the 11th century the site of Phitsanulok held a small settlement called Song Khwae, meaning two rivers, which a travel feature published by Siam Commercial Bank describes as a Khmer outpost. At that time, the Nan and Khwae Noi Rivers both flowed through the city, making it a strategic gateway to northern Thailand. The urban development of Phitsanulok, which began during the trail end of the era of the Khmer Empire, was to a great extent modeled on the earlier development of the Khmer capital city of Angkor in Cambodia. In fact, Angkor Wat, the chief temple of Angkor, was a temple to the god Vishnu, whereas Song Khwae's forthcoming new name Phitsanu-lok literally means Vishnu's Heaven. These are statements about architecture and about a name, and neither is evidence of administration. Baker and Pasuk record that Angkor-influenced settlements appeared in frontier areas around the Chao Phraya plain, Sukhothai and Si Satchanalai among them, and that "some historians have read this spread as waves of conquest"; they report the reading without saying what did happen. No temple-endowment inscription of the Angkorian provincial type has been found in the plain, and the hospital and fire-house foundations of Jayavarman VII reach no further west than Prachin Buri, a statement the same authors make for that reign alone.

== Singhanavati city-state ==
In 1188 King Boromma Chayasiri of Singhanavati, a city-state centred on modern Chiang Rai, is said to have expanded it to include much of what is now Phitsanulok Province. He moved his capital to Nakhon Thai and ruled from there for a time. The early city of Nakhon Thai thereby became the second urban center of the province, and one of the few urban areas in the Nan Basin, at that time, not situated directly on the banks of the Nan River. Rather, Nakhon Thai was situated at the foothills of the Phetchabun Mountains along one of the main tributaries of the Khwae Noi River. Nakhon Thai's period as a major urban center was short lived, however, as the throne of Singhanavati moved on. The predominant city of the region throughout the Sukhothai and Ayutthaya period, as well as in modern times, would be Phitsanulok, due to the city's prime location at a major tributarial junction of the Nan River. Singhanavati survived through the Sukhothai era. The fourth successor after Boromma Chayasiri on its throne was Ramathibodi I, who became the first king of Ayutthaya in 1351.

== Sukhothai period ==
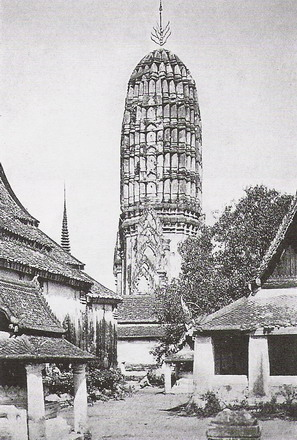
Historic photograph of Wat Phra Sri Rattana Mahathat

During the Sukhothai period, Phitsanulok emerged as the major city in the east of the Sukhothai Kingdom. It is during the Sukhothai period that Theravada Buddhism was first adopted as a unifying religion throughout the kingdom (although Buddhism in general was popular throughout Southeast Asia, including Thailand, throughout the era of the Khmer Empire). As such, the Sukhothai period witnessed the construction of Wat Chula Manee and the subsequent construction of Wat Aranyik and Wat Chedi Yod Thong. The renowned Wat Phra Sri Rattana Mahathat was constructed in 1357, during the reign of King Maha Thammaradscha I of Sukhothai. Wat Phra Sri Rattana Mahathat, more commonly known as Wat Yai, is famous throughout Thailand for its golden sculpture of the Buddha called the Phra Buddha Chinnarat (Thai: พระพุทธชินราช). Many Thai people consider the Chinnarat, which depicts the Buddha in the posture of submission, to be the most beautiful Buddha image in Thailand. The Chinnarat is the subject of the official seal of the present-day Phitsanulok Province. While the Ayutthaya period of Thailand had already begun in 1351, Phitsanulok remained part of the Sukhothai Kingdom for some time afterward. The Sukhothai inscriptions call the town Muang Song Khwae, while the Ayutthaya annals call it Chainat until 1463. An Ayutthayan army under Borommarachathirat I took it in 1378 and received the homage of Maha Thammaracha II there. Sukhothai became a tributary state of Ayutthaya between 1365 and 1378, and in 1412, King Thammaracha IV was installed on the throne of Sukhothai by Ayutthaya. Around 1430, Thammaracha IV moved his capital to Phitsanulok, although after his death in 1438, the Sukhothai Kingdom was reduced in status to a mere province of Ayutthaya. By then, Phitsanulok can be said to have completed its gradual transition into the Ayutthaya period. Throughout the Sukhothai era, most of the land within Phitsanulok Province, aside from the city of Phitsanulok, remained sparsely populated virgin rainforest.

== Ayutthaya period ==
The Ayutthaya period was the era of chief historical importance for Phitsanulok. By this era, the city of Phitsanulok had become a major urban center, specializing in porcelain production, and in addition, Phitsanulok's grand temples built along a major strategic waterway had transformed the city into a great cultural center. In 1461, Ayutthayan King Boromma Trailokanat (1448-1488), accompanied by more than 2,000 followers attended Wat Chula Manee, where he became the first king to have been ordained as a monk, a tradition that has continued on to present-day Thailand. The Ayutthaya period was also marked with war, as the competing kingdoms of the region, now growing more and more modern and capable, were competing for both survival, and for control over larger territories. In both 1459 and 1460, the kingdom of Lanna, a buffer state between the kingdoms of Ayutthaya and Burma, attempted twice to besiege the city of Phitsanulok, although both times Phitsanulok prevailed in maintaining its sovereignty.

=== Phitsanulok as the Capital of Ayutthaya Kingdom ===
Phitsanulok reached the peak of its historical import in 1463, when King Trailokanat moved the capital of the Ayutthaya kingdom to the city to strengthen the northern boundary of the kingdom. The move joined Chainat and Song Khwae inside a single wall, and Trailokanat held court there until his death in 1488. Under the Palace Law the governorship of Phitsanulok was reserved for the Royal Scion, the son of the principal queen, and a run of Suphannaphum princes went from the viceroyalty there to the throne at Ayutthaya. Joao de Barros, writing in the 1550s from traders' reports, described a northern Siamese kingdom he called Chaumua, distinct from the southern one. During Trailokanat's reign, Phitsanulok witnessed the construction of Wat Ratchaburana and Wat Nang Phaya. Around 1488, King Trailokanat's successor Boromma Racha III moved the capital of the Ayutthaya Kingdom from Phitsanulok back to Ayutthaya.

=== War with Burma ===
In 1548 Khun Phirenthorathep, who had taken part in the coup that put Maha Chakkraphat on the throne, was rewarded with the title Maha Thammaracha. He received the right to issue royal command from Phitsanulok, marriage to the highest-ranking princess, the appointment of his own officials and the use of royal insignia.

By the year 1562, Ayutthaya (including Phitsanulok) fell under Burmese occupation, and was forced to pay tributes to the Burmese King Bayinnaung. Just seven years prior, in 1555, a prince by the name of Naresuan was born in the city of Phitsanulok. The sources disagree over what happened at Phitsanulok in Bayinnaung's campaign of 1563. The Luang Prasert chronicle puts the town's fall down to famine and epidemic, and the Royal Autograph version has it resist feebly after Sukhothai and Sawankhalok had submitted. The Burmese Hmannan Yazawin Dawgyi has the northern towns resist fiercely, while Van Vliet makes the town's own ruler the instigator of the war. Prince Naresuan had been held in Burma for nine years to ensure the fidelity of his father, the Ayutthayan prince Maha Thammaracha. In 1571 he was released in exchange for his sister and took the governorship of Phitsanulok, which came easily since his father had ascended the throne of Ayutthaya as King Sanpet I in 1569. In 1584 Naresuan swept the northern population down to Ayutthaya to concentrate the defence around the capital, and after he left the north in that year Phitsanulok ceased to be a princely city and passed to appointed officials. In 1584, three years after Burmese King Bayinnaung's death in 1581, Ayutthaya's tributary relation with Burma was unilaterally cancelled, which was inevitably followed by a vigorous Burmese attack on the kingdom. Naresuan fought back against the Burmese army, and in 1586 he occupied Lanna, a buffer state between the two kingdoms. In 1590, Naresuan's father King Sanpet I died, and Naresuan officially became the leader of the Kingdom of Ayutthaya. In 1591 the Burmese started another attack, which was cancelled when the Burmese crown prince Mingyi Swa was killed by Naresuan in personal combat on elephant back in Nong Sarai (Suphanburi). During all of the battles in the war between Ayutthaya and Burma, Phitsanulok was a major place of recruitment.

=== King Naresuan the Great ===
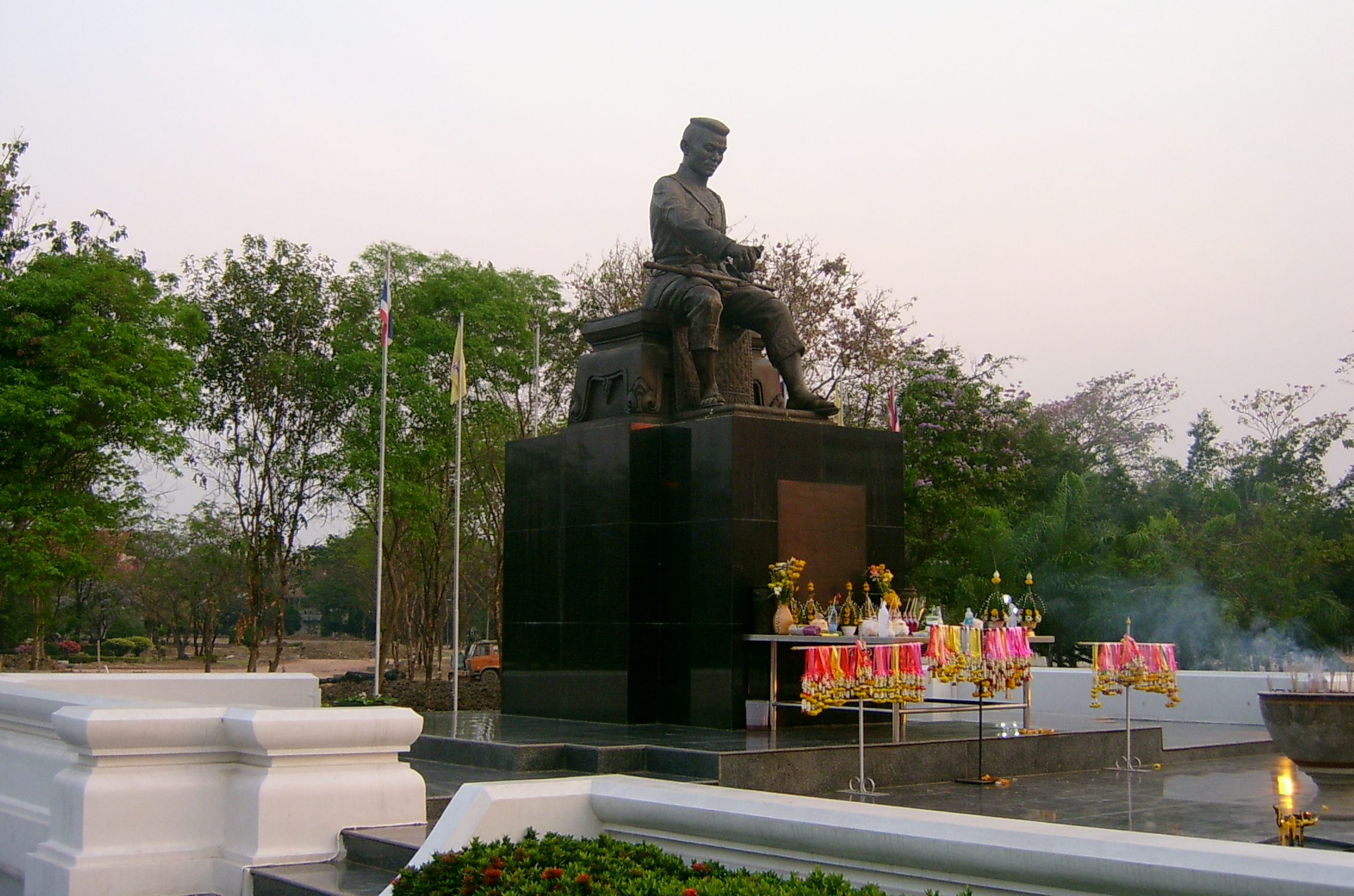
Statue of King Naresuan the Great at Naresuan University

After gaining independence from Burma, King Naresuan began a series of offensive attacks, beginning with an attack on Tenasserim in 1592. By his death in 1605 Naresuan had expanded the Ayutthayan Kingdom to its greatest extent, taking in much of modern Burma, Laos and Cambodia. That expansion set the stage for a unified Kingdom of Siam. Naresuan's triumphs as king earned him the nickname King Naresuan the Great, and his nativity in Phitsanulok is a great source of pride for the province. Naresuan is mentioned in the provincial motto, and a number of sites within the province, including Naresuan University, the Fort Naresuan Royal Thai Army base, and the Naresuan Dam are named in his honor. A King Naresuan the Great Shrine was also erected at the site of his birth at Chandra Palace in Phitsanulok. The palace is being restored, in preparation for opening it to the public as a museum.

=== Late Ayutthayan Period ===
The Ayutthaya period lasted well into the 18th century, during which the Province of Phitsanulok continued to develop. In contrast to the early Ayutthayan construction of elaborate city temples, the late Ayutthayan period witnessed the construction of a number of smaller temples in the various settlements throughout the province's rural areas. Temples such as Wat Grung See Jayrin were constructed with ornate chedi, with architecture modeled on the great temples of Ayutthaya. Even at the end of the Ayutthayan Period, however, most of the province still remained sparsely populated jungle. As long periods of war had ensued during the Ayutthaya period, many of the province's early temples were in a state of great disrepair, if not largely annihilated. Efforts to improve the early temples began in the late Ayutthayan Period, including a decree of King Boromma Kot in 1756, ordering mother-of-pearl inlaid doors to be built for the entrance to Wat Phra Sri Rattana Mahathat. The doors still mark the entrance of the temple today.

== Modern Siam/Thailand ==
=== 19th century ===
The 19th century was the period during which many of the smaller settlements in western Phitsanulok Province (then Phitsanulok Precinct) such as Bang Krathum, Nakhon Pa Mak and Wang Thong began to turn into urban societies. Phitsanulok's municipal market was established in the village of Ban Sam Ruen in Nakhon Pa Mak. Long-boat racing emerged in the same period as friendly competition between the riparian villages, which dense forest still separated. Temple restorations in the city of Phitsanulok continued through the 19th century, including the restoration of Wat Ratchaburana ordered by King Mongkut. In 1898, The Phitsanulok municipal market moved up the Wang Thong River from Ban Sam Ruen to Ban Wang Thong as the upriver portions of the province became more and more developed. New technology, agricultural and otherwise, was introduced into the region, in part by influences of western colonial powers in Southeast Asia, which paved the way for widespread rapid development of the province in the 20th century. The 19th century also brought a wave of Laotian and Chinese immigrants to the Phitsanulok Province, who each added their contributions to the local culture, especially in the areas of cuisine, art and language. In 1895, King Chulalongkorn implemented far-reaching reforms in the administration of Thailand which divided Phitsanulok Province into amphoe and tambon. While the boundaries and names of many of the original subdivisions have changed, the system is still in place throughout Phitsanulok and the rest of Thailand.

=== 20th century ===
During the 20th century, Phitsanulok Province became an important agricultural center, part of the Bread Basket of Thailand, providing rice and other crops to consumers in Thailand and throughout the world. Extensive agricultural development over the last hundred years or so has spawned a modern infrastructure in the urban areas of the province, bringing with it an array of modern roads, universities, hospitals and other conveniences. During the 20th century, nearly all of the lowlands in Phitsanulok Province were cleared of their rainforest vegetation to make way for rice farms. Systems of intricate canals were also implemented throughout the region to provide irrigation and drainage for the farms. The population of the province grew sharply in this period, largely through the clearing of the forest. Better transport also played a part, with highways, a railway and an airport at Phitsanulok. This rapid development also created problems including large-scale habitat destruction and increased severely of seasonal flooding and drought. A timeline illustrating the key events of the 20th century within the province is as follows:

- In 1908, Thailand's northern railway reached Phitsanulok.
- In 1910, Phitsanulok's status was changed from precinct to province.
- The first agricultural cooperative in Thailand, the Wat Chan Agricultural Cooperative Unlimited Liability, was established in Phitsanulok Province on February 26, 1916.
- The Phitsanulok fire of 1955 destroyed much of the older portion of the city of Phitsanulok.
- In 1956, the construction of Route 12, Phitsanulok-Lom Sak Highway was completed.
- On Nov 28, 1961, the King Naresuan Shrine was completed at Chan Palace.
- On January 25, 1967, the Phitsanulok campus of College of Education (Today's Naresuan University) was established.
- The province was severely flooded in 1967, prompting plans for construction of a major dam north of the city of Phitsanulok.
- From the late 1960s until the early 1980s, the territory now set aside as Phu Hin Rong Kla National Park was the main stronghold of the now defunct communist People's Liberation Army of Thailand.
- Thung Salaeng Luang was established as a national park in 1972.
- The Naresuan Dam was constructed throughout the span of 1976 through 1985 on the Nan River as part of the Phitsanulok Irrigation Project.
- In 1982, the historical Brotherly Villages Boat Race was reintroduced to promote the unity of Wang Thong communities.
- Phu Hin Rong Kla was established as a national park in 1984.
- The Chat Trakan District of Phitsanulok Province was a front in the Thailand-Laos Border War of December, 1987 - February, 1988.

=== Recent events ===
Present day Phitsanulok Province can perhaps best be described as a region in a state of rapid transition into a fully modern society. In suburban areas, modern homes are being erected where traditional Thai-style houses once stood, and conveniences such as running water and public health centers are emerging in even the most remote reaches of the province. As the rest of the world has entered the communication era, so too has Phitsanulok. Even the remote Bang Krathum post office now has an internet kiosk where villagers can access the web at their leisure. Since the mobile phone reached the region, residents can communicate easily with people and businesses throughout Thailand and abroad. A list of noteworthy events which occurred since 2000 in the province is as follows:

- In June 2001, Phitsanulok hosted the Asia-Pacific Summit of Women Mayors and Councillors.
- In 2005, two cases of bird flu were uncovered on a duck farm in the province.

==== 2007 flooding ====
Deforestation and urban development along the river banks in the region, combined with seasonal downpours in the Phetchabun Mountains have led to severe flooding in recent years within the province. Flooding in the province in 2007 was described by the Bangkok post as the worst floods in 40 years. On October 4, 2007, 100 rescue workers and 100 soldiers were dispatched to assist stranded residents in tambon Chompu and tambon Ban Mung, where water levels rose more than a meter. On that same day, Phitsanulok Governor Somboon Sripattanawat declared the Noen Maprang District a disaster zone. On October 6, 2007, Pongsagorn Kaenmanee, age 9 was among the first to drown in the flood waters. By October 8, 2007, the floods had killed at least three people in the Wang Thong District, and that district, in addition to Noen Maprang, was declared a disaster zone. On October 8, 2007, Deputy Prime Minister and Social Development and Human Security minister Paiboon Wattanasiritham visited the Phitsanulok Province to assess and address the flooding issues in the province. On October 10, 2007, the Office of Disaster Prevention and Mitigation sent boats out to deliver food and water supplies to residents of Bang Krathum District, which was cut off by floods. On October 12, 2007, the flooding took the life of a fifth villager in the province, who drowned after being swept away while he was rowing his boat to cast a fishing net. On October 14, 2007, flood water pressure sent inflows through the Nakhon Phitsanulok Municipality's sewage system, flooding three communities. On October 15, 2007, the Royal Irrigation Department announced plans to construct six dams on the Wang Thong River as an attempt to solve the problem of seasonal flooding. On October 16, 2007 Thung Salaeng Luang National Park was temporarily closed for fear that tourists may become trapped in its caves by flood waters (This was prompted by an incident in Surat Thani's Khao Sok National Park where a group of cave exploring tourists drowned). A meeting of senior officials is scheduled for October 31, 2007 to discuss the progress of an environmental impact assessment (EIA) of the dam proposal. At least one of the dams will be in Thung Salaeng Luang National Park, but officials ensure that it will not be built in a wildlife sanctuary area. Flooding in the region is a recurring problem in Phitsanulok Province this time of year. In 2006, for example, between August 20 and December 13, over 22,000 people in 70 villages within Phitsanulok were affected by flooding, and over 1,800 acres (7.3 km^{2}) of farmland and 194 roads within the province were submerged by flood waters.

== See also ==
Thai Wikisource has original text related to this article: History of Phitsanulok
