= Bang Krathum subdistrict =

Bang Krathum บางกระทุ่ม (English: Bur-Flower Tree Settlement)
- Subdistrict
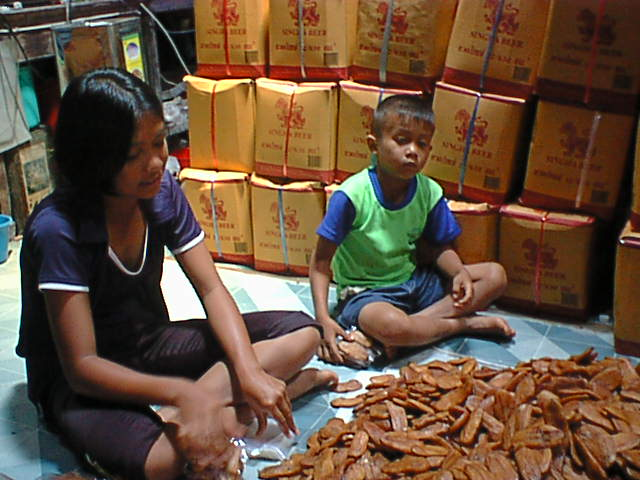
- Banana factory, Bang Krathum

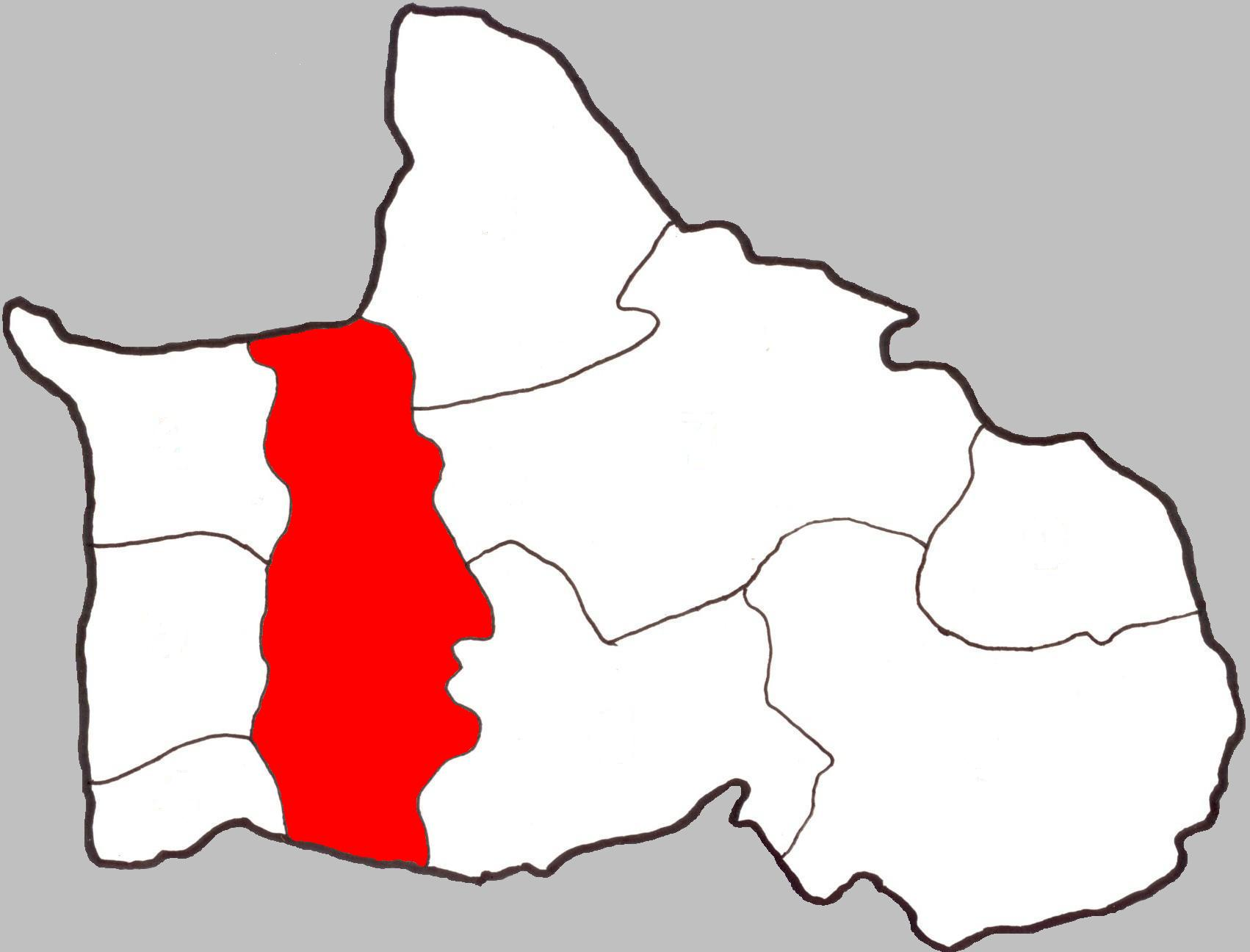
- Location of Bang Krathum in the district
- Coordinates: 16°34′30″N 100°18′00″E
- Country: Thailand
- Province: Phitsanulok
- District: Bang Krathum
- Elevation: 42 m (138 ft)

Population (2005)
  - Total: 6,585
- Time zone: UTC+7 (ICT)
- Postal code: 65110
- Geocode: 650501
- Chief roadway: Route 1114
- Chief watercourse: Canal to Wang Thong River

Bang Krathum (Thai: บางกระทุ่ม) is a subdistrict (tambon) in the Bang Krathum District of Phitsanulok Province, Thailand.

== Etymology ==
The first element bang (Thai: บาง) means 'village' or 'settlement'. The second element krathum (Thai: กระทุ่ม) means 'bur-flower tree' (Anthocephalus chinensis).

== Geography ==
Bang Krathum's topography consists of flat, fertile lowlands. Clockwise from the north, the subdistrict is bordered by Wang Nam Khu (of Mueang Phitsanulok District), Tha Tan, Nakhon Pa Mak, Phai Lom, Ta Fo (of Mueang Phichit District in Phichit Province), Sanam Khli, Khok Salut and Ban Rai. Bang Krathum lies in the Nan Basin, which is part of the Chao Phraya Watershed. The town of Ban Bang Krathum is on the tambon's chief watercourse, a canal which winds through farms heading north-east to Ban Bang Kranoi in Nakhon Pa Mak, where it joins the Wang Thong River. The canal splits once between Ban Bang Krathum and Ban Bang Krathum, where a smaller branch leads due north to Ban Bueng Lam in Nakhon Pa Mak.

== Administration ==
The subdistrict is divided into 11 smaller divisions called (muban), which roughly correspond to the six villages in Bang Krathum. Bang Krathum is administered by a Tambon administrative organization (TAO). The mubans in Bang Krathum are enumerated as follows:

No.	English	Thai
1	Ban Mae Tiap	บ้านแม่เทียบ
2	Ban Khlong Galon	บ้านคลองกะล่อน
3	Ban Gor Koo	บ้านเกาะคู
4-5	Ban Bang Krathum (part)	บ้านบางกระทุ่ม
6	Ban Bang Krathum Nai (Downtown Ban Bang Krathum)	บ้านบางกระทุ่มใน
7	Ban Bueng Wian	บ้านบึงเวียน
8	Ban Hua Nong	บ้านหัวหนอง
9	Ban Mai Bang Krathum (New Ban Bang Krathum)	บ้านใหม่บางกระทุ่ม

== Temples ==
Bang Krathum is home to the following three temples:

- Wat Bang Krathum Nai in downtown Ban Bang Krathum
- Wat Mae Tiap in Ban Mae Tiap
- Wat Huai Gaew (Thai: วัดห้วยแก้ว, Crystal Stream Temple) in Ban Bang Krathum
