= Bang Krathum =

Bang Krathum may refer to:

- Bang Krathum District
- Bang Krathum Subdistrict
