= Noen Kum =

Noen Kum เนินกุ่ม
- Tambon
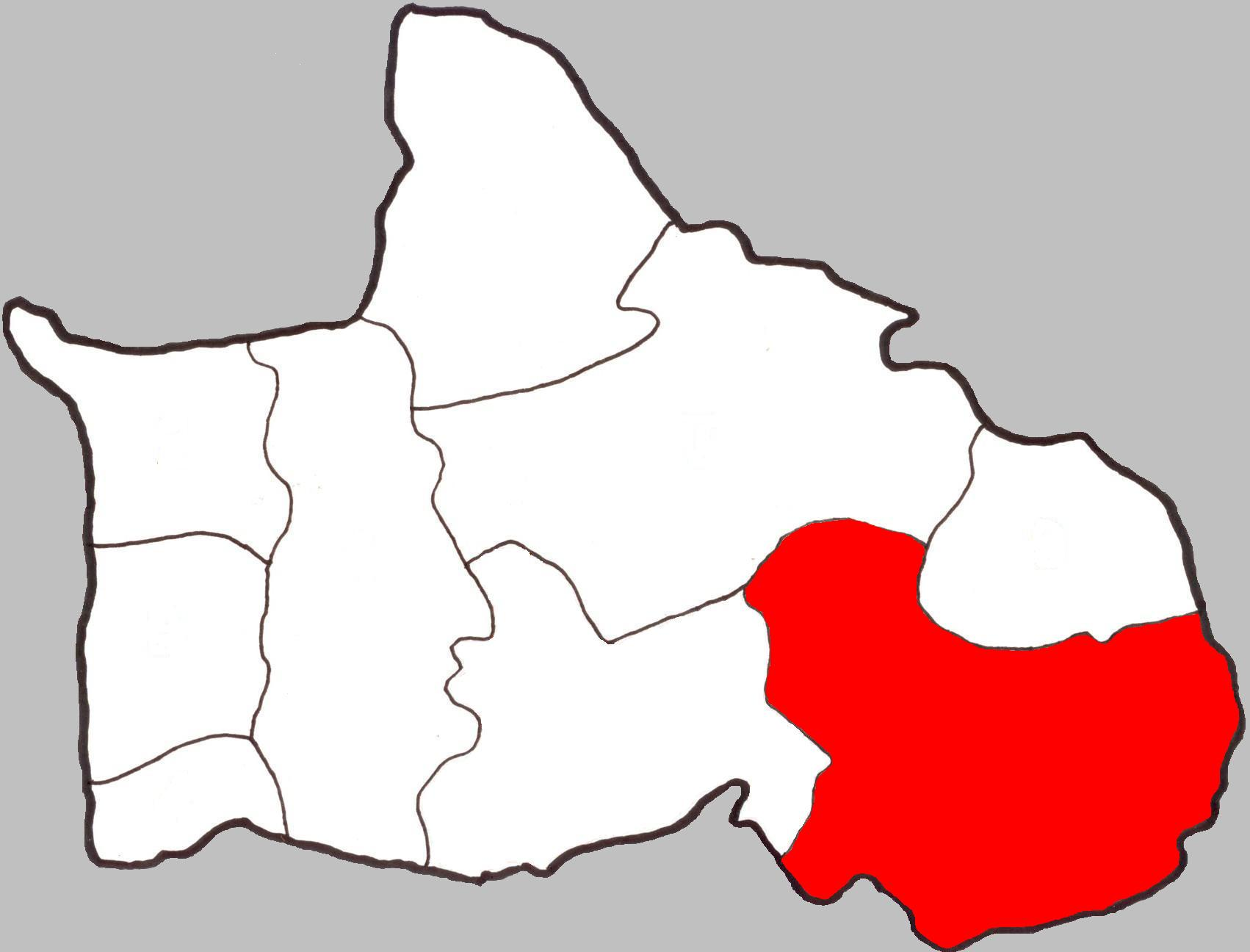
- Location of Noen Kum within Amphoe
- Coordinates: 16°33′00″N 100°25′00″E
- Country: Thailand
- Province: Phitsanulok
- District: Bang Krathum
- Elevation: 38 m (125 ft)

Population (2005)
  - Total: 8,838
- Time zone: UTC+7 (ICT)
- Postal code: 65110
- Geocode: 650508
- Chief roadway: Route 11
- Chief watercourse: Wat Ta Yom River

Noen Kum (Thai: เนินกุ่ม) is a subdistrict (tambon) in the Bang Krathum District of Phitsanulok Province, Thailand.

== Geography ==
Noen Kum borders Wat Ta Yom to the north, Wang Thong District to the north-east, Phichit Province to the south and south-east, Phai Lom to the west and Nakhon Pa Mak to the north-west.

Noen Kum lies in the Nan Basin, which is part of the Chao Phraya Watershed. The Wat Ta Yom River flows through Noen Kum.

== Administration ==
The subdistrict is divided into 11 smaller divisions called (muban), which roughly correspond to the villages in Noen Kum. There are seven villages, several of which occupy multiple muban. Noen Kum is administered by a Tambon administrative organization (TAO). The muban in Noen Kum are enumerated as follows:

No.	English	Thai
1	Ban Tha Yang	บ้านท่ายาง
2	Ban Nong Payayo	บ้านหนองพญายอ
3–6	Ban Noen Kum	บ้านเนินกุ่ม
7–8	Ban Dongmee	บ้านดงหมี
9	Ban Nong Grot	บ้านหนองกรด
10	Ban Tha Hae	บ้านท่าแห
11	Ban Wat Mai Prai Manee	บ้านวัดใหม่ไพรมณี

== Economy ==
The economy of Noen Kum is almost entirely based on rice farming and other agriculture.

== Temples ==
Noen Kum is home to the following seven temples:

- Wat Dongmee (Dongmee Village Temple) in Ban Dongmee
- Wat Noen Kum (Noen Kum Village Temple) in Ban Noen Kum
- วัดราษฎร์ศรัทธาราม in Ban Noen Kum
- Wat Sa Settee (Thai: วัดสระเศรษฐี, Wealthy Man's Pond Temple) in Ban Tha Yang
- วัดราษฎร์สถิต in Ban Nong Grot
- Wat Mai Prai Manee in Ban Wat Mai Prai Manee
- Wat Nong Grot (Nong Grot Villate Temple) in Ban Nong Grot
