= Wat Ta Yom =

Wat Ta Yom วัดตายม (English: Weeping Eye Temple)
- Tambon
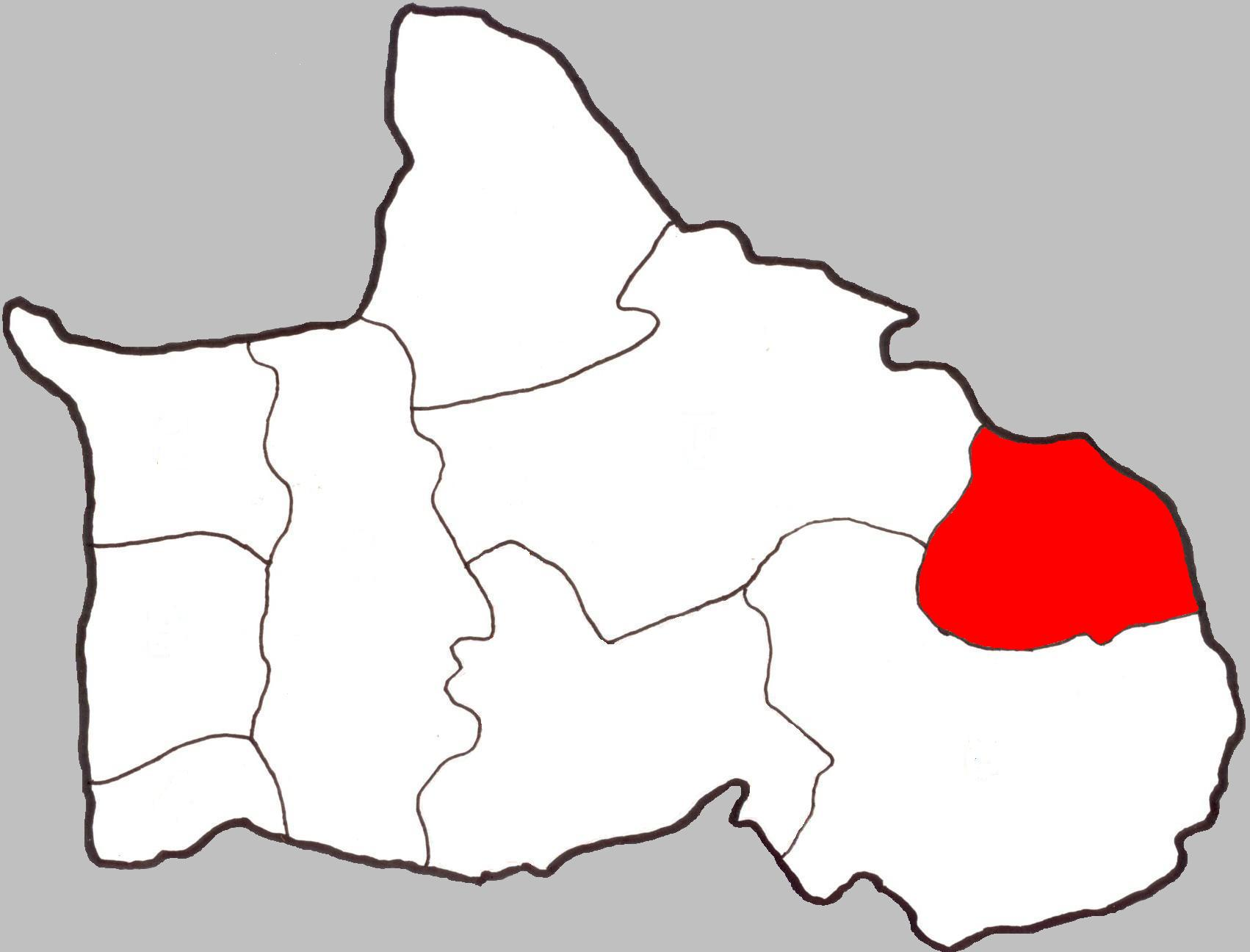
- Location of Wat Ta Yom in the district
- Coordinates: 16°36′00″N 100°26′00″E
- Country: Thailand
- Province: Phitsanulok
- District: Bang Krathum
- Elevation: 40 m (130 ft)

Population (2005)
  - Total: 5,293
- Time zone: UTC+7 (ICT)
- Postal code: 65110
- Geocode: 650509
- Chief roadway: Route 11
- Chief watercourse: Wat Ta Yom River

Wat Ta Yom (Thai: วัดตายม) is a subdistrict (tambon) in the Bang Krathum District of Phitsanulok Province, Thailand.

== Etymology ==
The first element wat (Thai: วัด) means 'temple'; the second element ta (Thai: ตา) means 'eye'; the third element 'yom' (Thai: ยม) means 'weep', hence 'weeping eye temple'.

== Geography ==
Wat Ta Yom is bordered to the north by Nong Phra in Wang Thong District, to the north-east by Phan Chali in Wang Thong District, to the south-east by Noen Kum, and to the south-west by Phai Lom and to the north-west by Nakhon Pa Mak. The district consists of flat lowlands with no hills or forest. The majority of the land has been cleared for agricultural use. The Wat Ta Yom River flows through Wat Ta Yom. The subdistrict lies in the Nan Basin, which is part of the Chao Phraya Watershed.

== History ==
Wat Ta Yom became a municipality in 1999.

== Economy ==
The economy of Wat Ta Yom is almost entirely based on agriculture, and the chief product is rice.

== Administration ==
The subdistrict is divided into eight smaller divisions called (muban). There are two villages in Wat Ta Yom, one of which, Ban Wat Ta Yom, occupies multiple mubans. Wat Ta Yom is administered by a Tambon administrative organization (TAO). The muban in Wat Ta Yom are enumerated as follows:

| No. | English | Thai |
| 1 | Ban Wat Ta Yom Thai (South Ban Wat Ta Yom) | บ้านวัดตายมใต้ |
| 2-6 | Ban Wat Ta Yom (part) | บ้านวัดตายม |
| 7-8 | Ban Khok Sanam | บ้านโคกสนั่น |

== Temples ==
Wat Ta Yom is home to the following five temples:

- Wat Jayrin Rat (Thai: วัดเจริญราษฎร์) in Ban Wat Ta Yom
- Wat Ta Yom in South Ban Wat Ta Yom
- Wat Pracha Ram (Thai: วัดประชาราม, People's Temple) in Ban Khok Sanam
- วัดราษฎร์นิยม in Ban Wat Ta Yom
- Wat Khok Sanam (Ban Khok Sanam Village Temple) in Ban Khok Sanam
