= Ban Laemphrathat =

Ban Laemphrathat บ้านแหลมพระธาตุ (English: Village of the Sharp Buddha-Relic)
- Village
- Location within Thailand
- Coordinates: 16°38′13″N 100°24′20″E
- Country: Thailand
- Province: Phitsanulok
- District: Bang Krathum
- Tambon: Nakhon Pa Mak

Area
  - Total: 10.4 km^{2} (4.0 sq mi)
  - Agricultural use: 7.0 km^{2} (2.7 sq mi)

Population (2005)
  - Total: 565
- Time zone: UTC+7 (ICT)
- Postal code: 65110

Ban Laemphrathat (Thai: บ้านแหลมพระธาตุ) is a village (muban) in the Nakhon Pa Mak subdistrict of Bang Krathum District of Phitsanulok Province, Thailand.

== Etymology ==
This village takes the name from its temple Wat Laemphrathat (Thai: วัดแหลมพระธาตุ). The first element, wat (Thai: วัด), means 'temple'. The second element, laem (Thai: แหลม), means 'sharp' or 'pointy'. The third element, phra (Thai: พระ), means 'monk' or image of Buddha. The fourth element, that (Thai: ธาตุ), means 'essence'. As a whole, the temple's name loosely translates to 'Temple of the Sharp Buddha Relic', and accordingly the name of the town village means 'Village of the Sharp Buddha Relic'.

== Geography ==
Ban Laemphrathat is in the eastern portion of Nakhon Pa Mak.

== Wat Laemphrathat ==
This Theravada Buddhist temple is said to enshrine a relic of the Buddha. It is also the location of one of Nakhon Pa Mak's four elementary schools, Wat Laemphrathat School.
