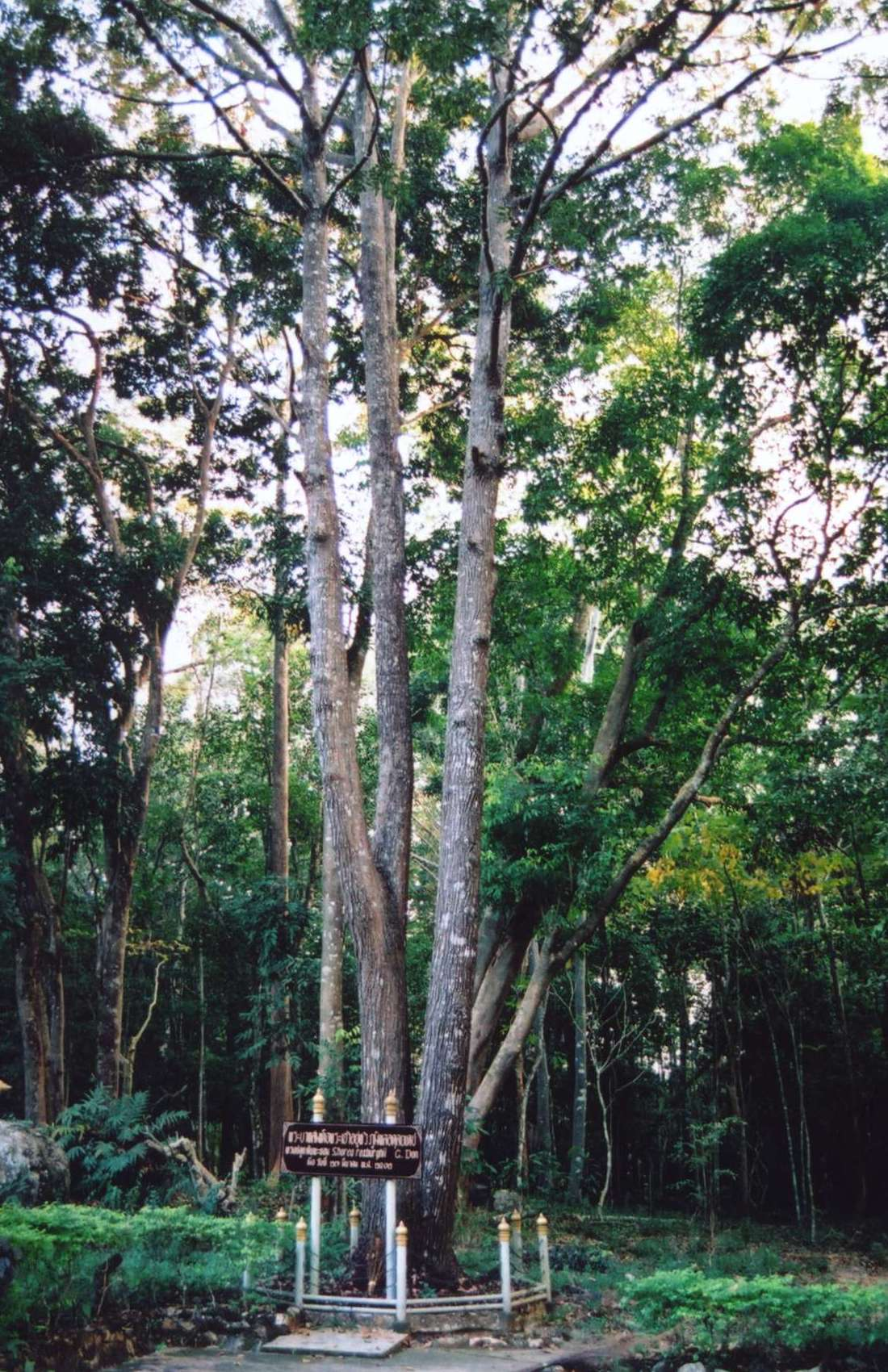

Conservation status
- Vulnerable (IUCN 3.1)

Scientific classification
- Kingdom: Plantae
- Clade: Tracheophytes
- Clade: Angiosperms
- Clade: Eudicots
- Clade: Rosids
- Order: Malvales
- Family: Dipterocarpaceae
- Genus: Anthoshorea
- Species: A. roxburghii

Binomial name
- Anthoshorea roxburghii (G.Don) P.S.Ashton & J.Heck. (2022)

Synonyms
- Synonyms list: Shorea roxburghii G.Don (1831) (basionym); Anthoshorea harmandii (Pierre ex Laness.) Pierre (1891); Hopea floribunda Wall. (1829), nom. nud.; Saul iallarea Roxb. ex Wight & Arn. (1834), not validly publ.; Shorea attopoensis Pierre (1890); Shorea cochinchinensis Pierre (1890); Shorea cochinchinensis var. saigonensis Pierre (1890); Shorea floribunda Kurz (1873); Shorea harmandii Pierre ex Laness. (1886); Shorea laccifera B.Heyne ex Wall. (1829); Shorea laurifolia Wall. ex Steud. (1841), not validly publ.; Shorea robusta Roth (1821), nom. illeg.; Shorea robusta A.DC. (1868), nom. illeg.; Shorea saigonensis (Pierre) Pierre (1892); Shorea talura Roxb. (1832); Shorea talura var. saigonensis (Pierre) Smitinand (1954); Vatica laccifera Wight & Arn. (1834)

= Anthoshorea roxburghii =

Species of tree

Anthoshorea roxburghii is a species of tree in the family Dipterocarpaceae. It is native to Cambodia, southern India, Laos, Malaysia, Burma, Thailand, and Vietnam.

== Common names ==
- Malay: Meranti Temak Nipis
- Thai: พะยอม, transliterated phayō̜m
- Vietnamese: sến đỏ

== References in place names ==
- Ban Dongphayom (บ้านดงพยอม) in Thailand, literally Shorea roxburghii Forest Village
