= Wat Ratchaburana =

Wat Ratchaburana is the name of multiple Thai Buddhist temples. The name may refer to:

- Wat Ratchaburana, Ayutthaya
- Wat Ratchaburana, Bangkok
- Wat Ratchaburana, Phitsanulok
