= Ban Dongphayom =

Ban Dongphayom บ้านดงพยอม (English: Shorea Forest Village)
- Village
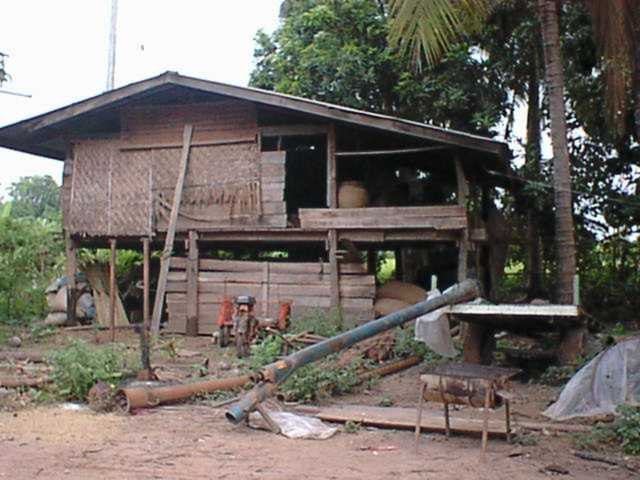
- House, Ban Dongphayom

- Location within Thailand
- Coordinates: 16°37′02″N 100°20′56″E
- Country: Thailand
- Province: Phitsanulok
- Amphoe: Bang Krathum
- Tambon: Nakhon Pa Mak

Government
  - Phu Yai Ban: Lamiet Muenpet

Area
  - Total: 6.2 km^{2} (2.4 sq mi)
  - Agricultural use: 4.3 km^{2} (1.7 sq mi)

Population (2005)
  - Total: 678
  - Male: 350
  - Female: 328
- Time zone: UTC+7 (ICT)
- Postal code: 65110
- Chief roadway: Unpaved road to Ban Sam Ruen
- Chief watercourse: Canal to Ban Grong Greng

Ban Dongphayom (Thai: บ้านดงพยอม) is a village (muban) in the Nakhon Pa Mak sub-district of Bang Krathum District of Phitsanulok Province, Thailand.

== Etymology ==
The first word ban (Thai: บ้าน) means home or village. The second word dong (Thai: ดง) means forest or jungle. The third word phayom (Thai: พยอม) is a type of rainforest tree of the genus Shorea indigenous to Thailand. While there is no common name for phayom in the English language, Philippine mahogany is a mixture of Shorea genera. A loose translation of the name as a whole would be "phayom wood forest village". There are few phayom trees left in Ban Dongphayom, as villagers have cleared the majority of the land for agriculture over the years. The phayom tree is an endangered species.

== Geography ==
Ban Dongphayom lies in the western portion of Nakhon Pa Mak, bordering Ban Sam Ruen. It is on land between the Wang Thong and the Wat Ta Yom Rivers, within the Nan Basin (part of the Chao Phraya Watershed). A canal flows through the village, which leads to Ban Grong Greng, where it joins another canal that joins the Wang Thong River at Ban Sam Ruen.

== Government ==
The current village headman of Ban Dongphayom is Phu Yai Ban Lamiet Muenpet. This position is an elected post, which is then followed by appointment by the Ministry of the Interior.

== Economy ==
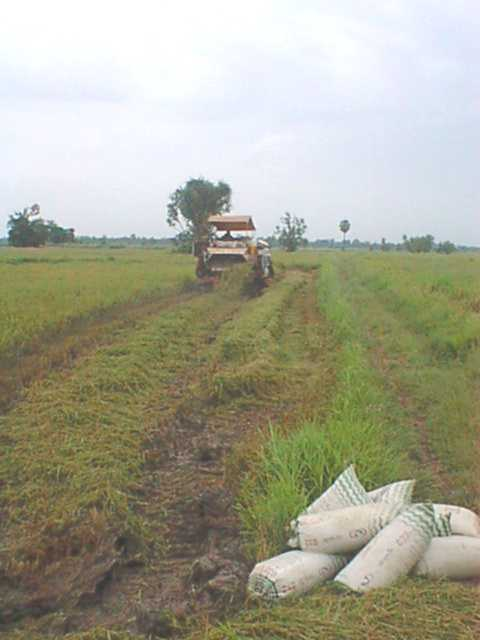
Rice farming, Ban Dongphayom

Ban Dongphayom is a rural agricultural residential village. Resident farmers in Ban Dongphayom are primarily engaged in the business of growing rice. However, most farms are diversified, growing sugar cane, bananas, mangos, papayas, chili peppers, coconuts, spices and herbs. Farmers in Ban Dongphayom also typically raise livestock such as cattle, chicken and pigs. A public pharmacy is also run from one of the homes in Ban Dongphayom which supplies medication to Ban Dongphayom villagers and residents of surrounding villages in Nakhon Pa Mak. Villagers also engage in fishing in the canal which flows through the village. As of 2001, running water had just been installed in Ban Dongphayom, and the water quality was not yet suitable for drinking. Electricity is available and most homes have televisions. Phone lines, however are not installed. Some villagers use mobile phones for communication outside the village. Transportation in and out of the village is over narrow dirt roads. These roads are the primary route for transportation in Ban Dongphayom, although the canal is navigable for small boats. Small bridges such as the bridge at Ban Dongphayom prevent larger vessels from navigating the canal.

== Wildlife ==
Ban Dongphayom is a natural habitat to a wide variety of insects, reptiles, amphibians, fish and other wildlife. Venomous snakes are a threat to the residents, and villagers take precautions in their daily activities to avoid being bitten. Mosquitos are also a problem due to the amount of standing water in the nearby rice farms, although there are no recent cases of Malaria reported. Siamese fighting fish (Betta splendens) are found in the canal flowing through the village, and children of the village often collect them for pets. Crabs live in the standing water of the rice farms.

== Culture ==
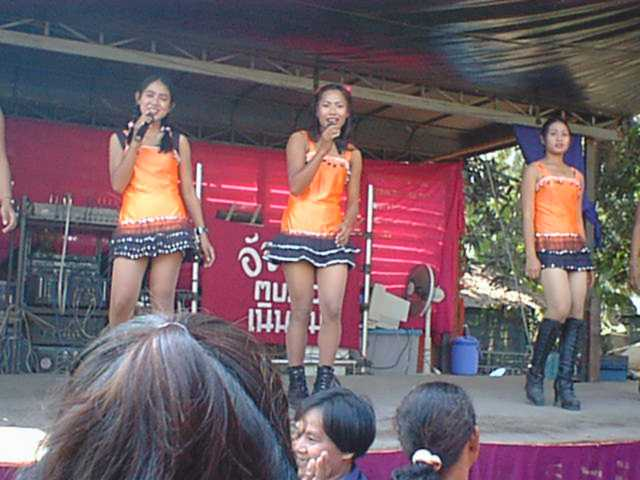
Dancers at a wedding reception, Ban Dongphayom

Residents of Ban Dongphayom are Theravada Buddhists. Ancestor worship is practiced, and homes often have shrines dedicated to elders of the family who have died. Offerings of food and drink are placed beside the shrines. Children of Ban Dongphayom attend school in neighboring Ban Sam Ruen. They travel to school by bicycle and on foot. There is no bus service. Large celebrations are commonplace in Ban Dongphayom, as local weddings and other events such as coming-of-age ceremonies and death anniversaries are well attended by the entire community. Celebrations involve days of preparation and entertainment is customary. Singers and dancers are typically hired for these events. Traditional ethnic clothing is no longer worn by villagers of Ban Dongphayom, other than for certain religious ceremonies. Men of the village, however, often obtain astrological tattoos on their bodies, which they believe protect them from danger. Monks use different tools to make the tattoos. Some of the monks use sharpened sticks of bamboo; others use thin weighted metal rods.

== Wat Dongphayom ==
Wat Dongphayom (Thai: วัดดงพยอม) is a small temple in Ban Dongphayom. Wat Dongphayom was built in the 1980s on the grounds of a defunct cemetery. The temple has two monks. Ban Dongphayom villagers generally worship at nearby Wat Sam Ruen, not at Wat Dongphayom, although Wat Dongphayom has merit-making activities on Buddhist days. Funerals of Ban Dongphayom residents are generally held at nearby Wat Grung See Jayrin. Wat Dongphayom consists of a single small building, and does not have a chedi.

== Ban Dongphayom boat race ==
Ban Dongphayom is the starting point for an annual long-boat race. One such race took place on 6 October 2001 and was publicized by Thailand's Department of Agriculture Extension. The exact date of the race is not tied to the calendar, but rather depends on the water level of the canal.
