= Sanam Khli =

Sanam Khli สนามคลี (English: Open Field)
- Subdistrict
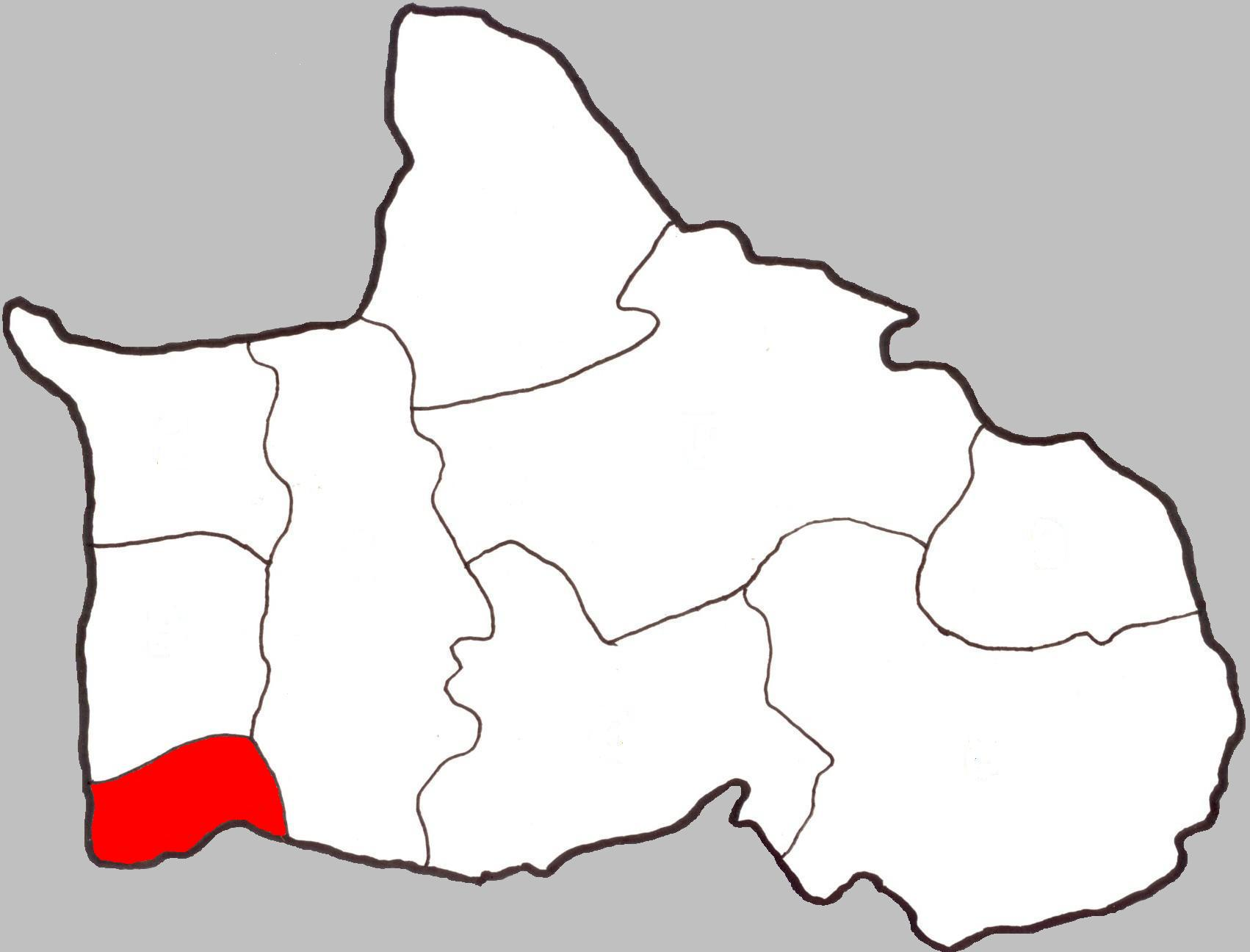
- Location of Sanam Khli in the district
- Coordinates: 16°32′30″N 100°15′00″E
- Country: Thailand
- Province: Phitsanulok
- District: Bang Krathum

Population (2005)
  - Total: 2,535
- Time zone: UTC+7 (ICT)
- Postal code: 65110
- Geocode: 650504
- Chief watercourse: Nan River

Sanam Khli (Thai: สนามคลี) is a sub-district (tambon) in the Bang Krathum District of Phitsanulok Province (amphoe), Thailand.

== Geography ==
Sanam Khli borders Khok Salut to the north, Bang Krathum to the east, and Phichit Province to the south and west. Most of Sanam Khli lies within the Nan Basin, although a narrow strip of land on the west side of the sub-district lies within the Yom Basin. Both basins are part of the Chao Phraya Watershed. The Nan River flows through Sanam Khli at Ban Sanam Khli.

== Administration ==
The sub-district is divided into six smaller divisions called (mubans). There are two villages in Sanam Khli. Ban Sanam Khli occupies five of the mubans. Sanam Khli is administered by a tambon administrative organization (TAO). The mubans in Sanam Khli are enumerated as follows:

No.	English	Thai
1-5	Ban Sanam Khli	บ้านสนามคลี
6	Ban Bueng Bua	บ้านบึงบัว

== Temples ==
Sanam Khli is home to the following two temples, which are both in Ban Sanam Khli:

- Wat Sanam Khli (East Temple)
- Wat Sanam Khli (West Temple)
