= Ban Grong Greng =

Ban Grong Greng บ้านโกรงเกรง (English: Village of the Dreaded Gong)
- Village
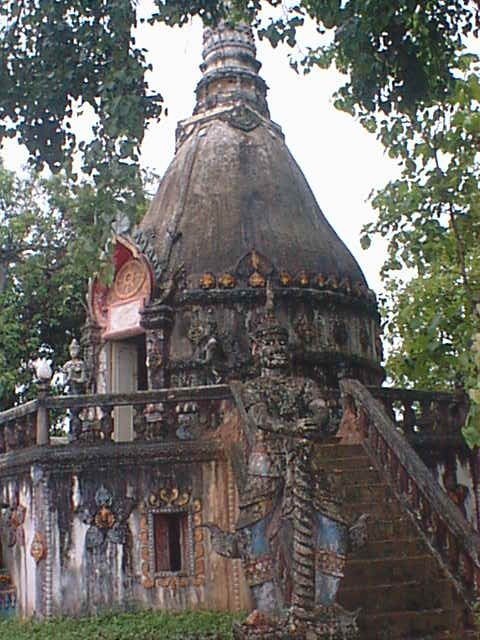
- Chedi at Wat Grung See Jayrin, Ban Grong Greng

- Location within Thailand
- Coordinates: 16°36′30″N 100°22′30″E
- Country: Thailand
- Province: Phitsanulok
- District: Bang Krathum District
- Subdistrict: Nakhon Pa Mak

Area
  - Total: 20.9 km^{2} (8.1 sq mi)
  - Agricultural use: 14.1 km^{2} (5.4 sq mi)

Population (2005)
  - Total: 1,881
  - Density: 90/km^{2} (230/sq mi)
- Time zone: UTC+7 (ICT)
- Postal code: 65110
- Chief watercourse: Canal to Ban Sam Ruen

Ban Grong Greng (Thai: บ้านโกรงเกรง) is a rural village in the north-west portion of the Nakhon Pa Mak Subdistrict of Bang Krathum District of Phitsanulok Province, Thailand.

== Etymology ==
The first element of its name is ban (Thai: บ้าน) means 'village'. The second element, grong (Thai: โกรง) is an onomatopoeia for the sound of a gong, analogous to the word 'gong' in English. The third element, greng (Thai: เกรง), means 'dread'. Loosely translated, Ban Grong Greng means 'village of the dreaded gong'. This is because a gong is beaten during funeral processions at the village's temple in accordance with the local custom. The name Grong Greng is an example of an alliteration.

== Geography ==
Ban Grong Greng is near the center of Nakhon Pa Mak on a canal which meets the Wang Thong River at Ban Sam Ruen. This canal comes to a fork at Ban Grong Greng where another canal leads to Ban Dongphayom and beyond. Ban Grong Greng lies in the Nan Basin, which is part of the Chao Phraya Watershed. Ban Grong Greng has the greatest population of the eight villages in Nakhon Pa Mak, and it encompasses the largest area as well.

== Wat Grung See Jayrin ==
Wat Grung See Jayrin (Thai: วัดกรุงศรีเจริญ), which means 'temple of the city of renowned progress', is more commonly referred to simply as Wat Grong Greng (Thai: วัดโกรงเกรง). This Theravada Buddhist temple is where villagers of Ban Grong Greng and surrounding villages hold their funeral ceremonies. Funerals at Wat Grong Greng involve a procession around the temple, chanting, meditation, and cremation of the deceased's body. Prior to a funeral at Grong Greng, families typically hold a wake in the deceased's home where family, friends and neighbors can pay their respects to the deceased. Items brought to the wake, such as flower arrangements, photographs of the deceased, and mementos from the deceased's life are carried in the funeral procession. Black clothing is customarily worn by those in mourning, if available. Religious activities and ceremonies other than funerals are typically held at nearby Wat Sam Ruen in Ban Sam Ruen.

=== Architecture ===
The style of the chedi at Wat Grung See Jayrin is influenced by earlier Thai pagodas, such as those found in the ruins of Ayutthaya. This style was imported from Sri Lanka during the rule of King Ramkhamhaeng the Great along with Theravada Buddhism. Later, King Ramathibodi I went on to make Theravada Buddhism the official religion of the kingdom of Ayutthaya.

The ceremonial funeral chants at Wat Grong Greng are in Pali, the language of prayer of the Ceylonese Buddhist monastic community, members of which Ramkhamhaeng imported from Sri Lanka to teach Theravada Buddhism to his subjects in Thailand. Similar architecture can be found in Anuradhapura, Sri Lanka.

=== Wat Grung See Jayrin School ===
Wat Grung See Jayrin School, at Wat Grung See Jayrin, is one of Nakhon Pa Mak's four elementary schools.

=== Literary references ===
A Wat Grong Greng is mentioned in a work entitled เรื่องจริงอิงนิทาน เล่ม 1 (which loosely translates to first book of traditionally passed down stories) by Rasilingdam (Thai: ฤาษีลิงดำ).
