= Khok Salut =

Khok Salud โคกสลุด
- Subdistrict
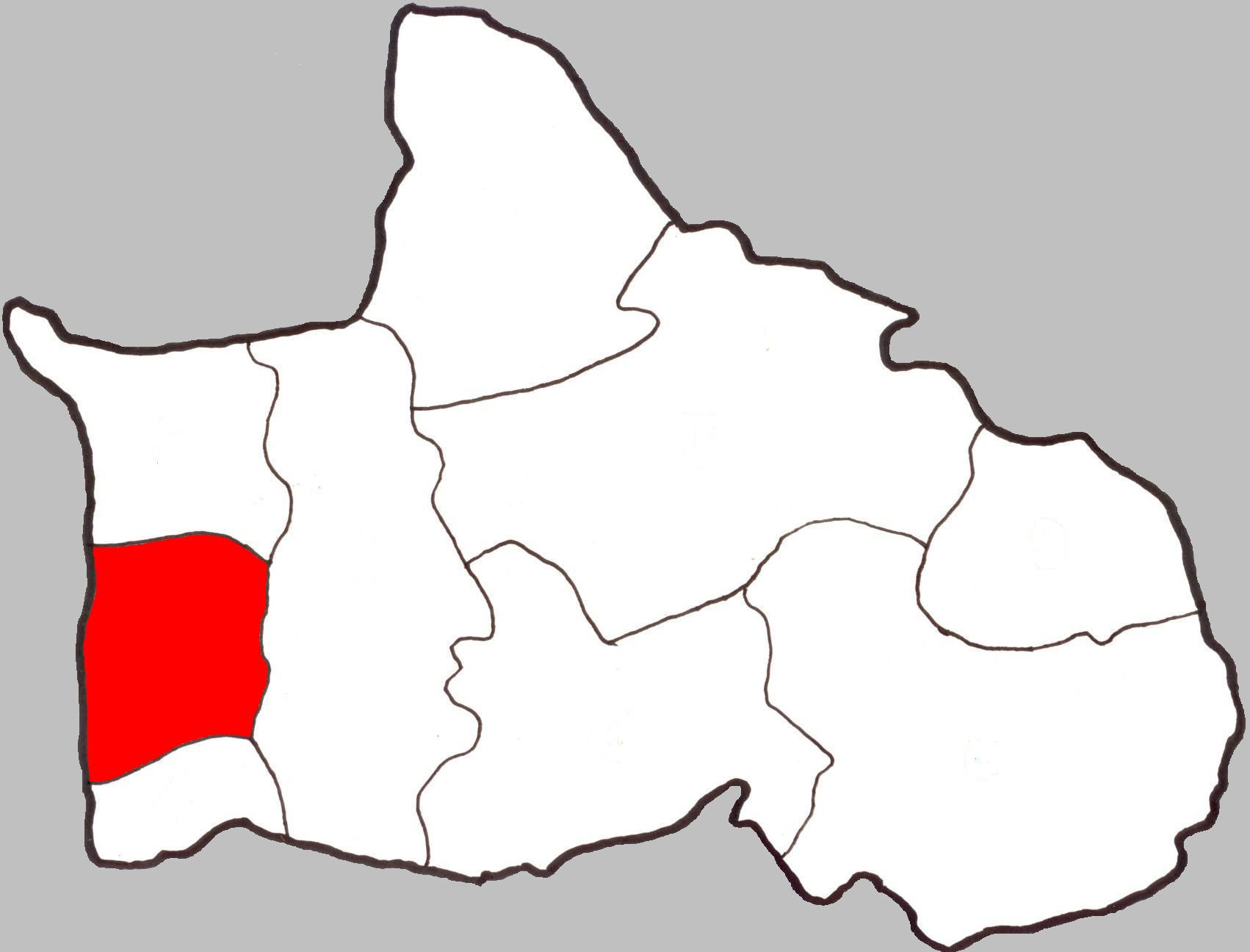
- Location of Khok Salut in the district
- Coordinates: 16°33′30″N 100°15′00″E
- Country: Thailand
- Province: Phitsanulok
- District: Bang Krathum

Population (2005)
  - Total: 3,342
- Time zone: UTC+7 (ICT)
- Postal code: 65110
- Geocode: 650503
- Chief roadway: Route 1063
- Chief watercourse: Nan River

Khok Salud (Thai: โคกสลุด) is a subdistrict (tambon) in the Bang Krathum District of Phitsanulok Province, Thailand.

== Geography ==
Khok Salut is bounded to the north by Ban Rai, to the east by Bang Krathum, to the south by Sanam Khli, and to the west by Phichit Province. Most of Khok Salut lies in the Nan Basin, although a narrow strip of land on the west side of the subdistrict lies in the Yom Basin. Both basins are part of the Chao Phraya Watershed. The Nan River flows through Khok Salut.

== Administration ==
The subdistrict is divided into 10 smaller divisions called (mubans), which roughly correspond to the villages in Khok Salut. There are six villages, several of which occupy multiple mubans. Khok Salut is administered by a tambon administrative organization (TAO). The mubans in Khok Salut are enumerated as follows:

No.	English	Thai
1-5	Ban Yan Yao	บ้านย่านยาว
6	Ban Chong Tai	บ้านโฉงใต้
7	Ban Chong Glang	บ้านโฉงกลาง
8	Ban Yung Kao	บ้านยุ้งข้าว
9	Ban Wang Tabua	บ้านวังตาบัว
10	Ban Hua Thanon	บ้านหัวถนน

== Temples ==
Khok Salut is home to the following four temples:

- วัดราษฎร์เจริญ in Ban Chong Glang
- Wat Kam Paeng Manee (Thai: วัดกำแพงมณี) in Ban Chong Tai
- Wat Prasat Satta (Thai: วัดประสาทศรัทธา, 'Temple of Bestowed Faith') in Ban Yan Yao
- Wat Yan Yao (Thai: วัดย่านยาว, 'Temple of Vast Expanse') in Ban Yan Yao
