= Wat Chedi Yot Thong =

Coordinates: 16°49′28″N 100°16′07″E

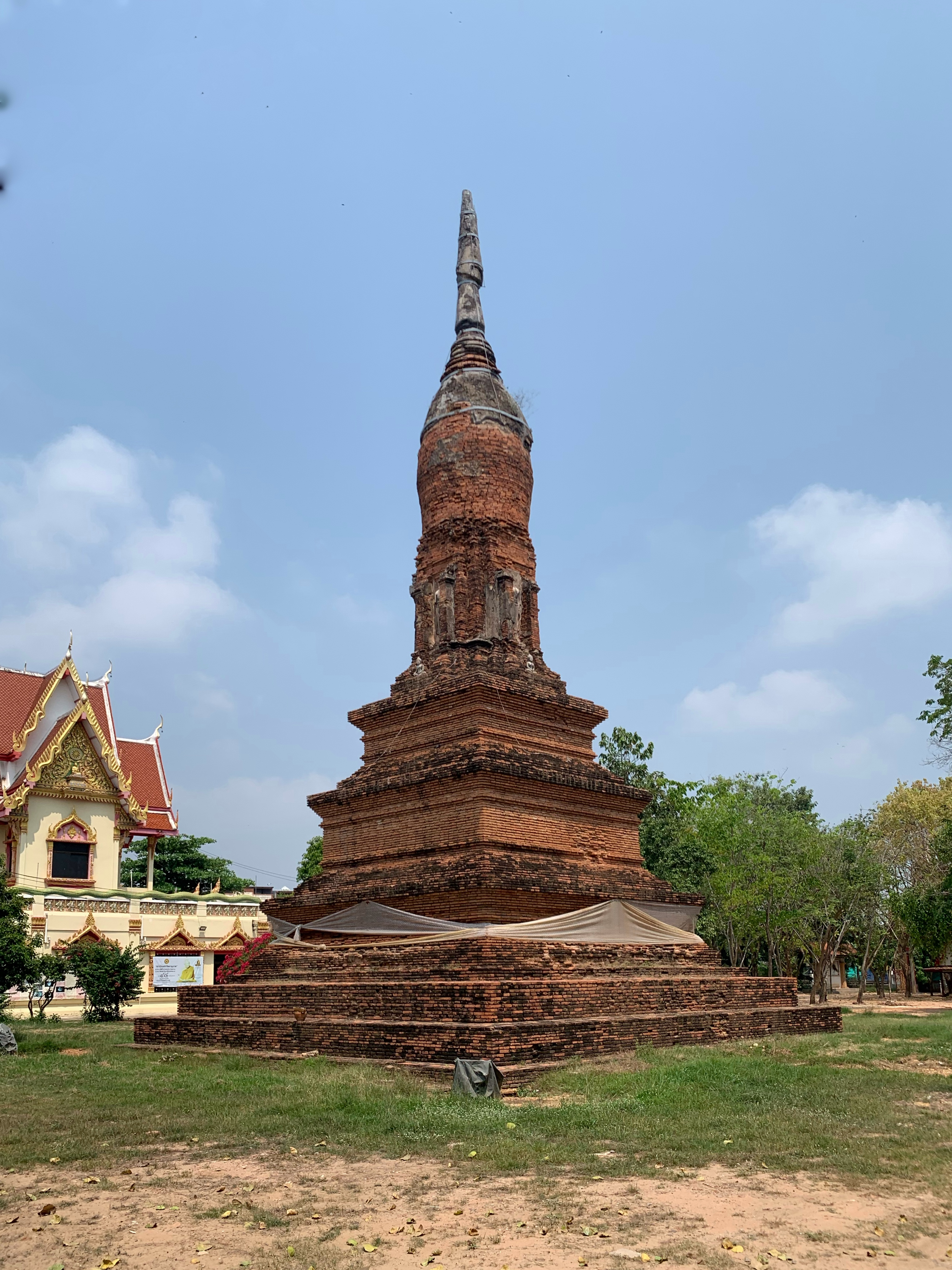
Stupa of Chedi Yot Thong

Wat Chedi Yot Thong is a historical Buddhist temple in Phitsanulok, Thailand.

== History ==
Wat Chedi Yot Thong was constructed during the Sukhothai era.

== Features ==
The temple is famous for its Sukhothai-style bud shaped chedi. This chedi is the only remaining one of this style in Phitsanulok Province. On the campus, there is a complex of monk houses, facing a small lake, and there is a small, modern temple structure nearby.
