= Ban Rai, Phitsanulok =

Ban Rai บ้านไร่ (English: Farm Village)
- Tambon
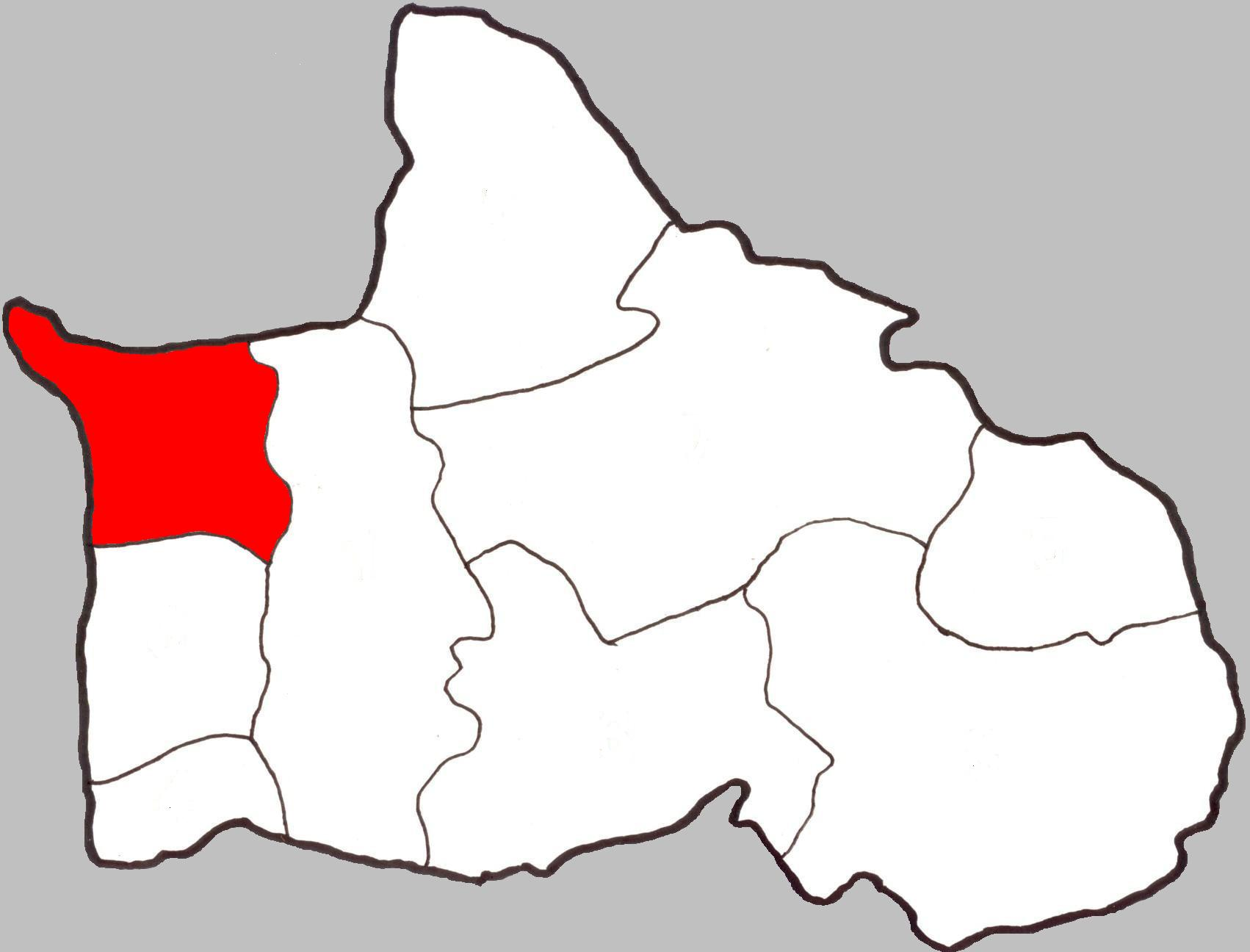
- Location of Ban Rai in the district
- Coordinates: 16°36′00″N 100°15′00″E
- Country: Thailand
- Province: Phitsanulok
- District: Bang Krathum

Population (2005)
  - Total: 4,671
- Time zone: UTC+7 (ICT)
- Postal code: 65110
- Geocode: 650502
- Chief Roadway: Route 1063

Ban Rai (Thai: บ้านไร่) is a subdistrict (tambon) in the Bang Krathum District of Phitsanulok Province, Thailand.

(Not to be confused with Ban Rai, Uthai Thani, which is a district (amphoe) in Uthai Thani Province, Thailand.)

== Geography ==
Ban Rai borders Bang Rakam District and Wang Nam Khu of Mueang Phitsanulok District to the north, Bang Krathum to the east, Khok Salut to the south and Phichit Province to the west. Most of Ban Rai lies in the Nan Basin, although a narrow strip of land on the west side of the subdistrict lies in the Yom Basin. Both basins are part of the Chao Phraya Watershed. The Nan River flows through Ban Rai at Ban Khok Salut, and the Yom River forms part of the subdistrict's border with Phichit.

== Administration ==
The subdistrict is divided into 10 smaller divisions called (muban) (villages). There are seven villages, several of which occupy multiple mubans. Ban Rai is administered by a Tambon administrative organization (TAO). The mubans in Ban Rai are enumerated as follows:

No.	English	Thai
1	Ban Hua Laem	บ้านหัวแหลม
2-3	Ban Khok Salud	บ้านโคกสลุด
4	Ban Rai	บ้านไร่
5-7	Ban Wat Kwang	บ้านวัดขวาง
8	Ban Hat Tra Koo	บ้านหาดตระกู
9	Ban Yan Non Prai	บ้านย่านโนนไพร
10	Ban Khon Apak	บ้านขอนอ้าปาก

== Temples ==
Ban Rai is home to the following four temples:

- Wat Sirisutthawas (วัดสิริสุทธาวาส in Ban Wat Kwang)
- Wat Khok Salud (วัดโคกสลุด Ban Khok Salud Village Temple) in Ban Khok Salud
- Wat Prai Soowan (Thai: th:วัดไพรสุวรรณ, Golden Forest Temple) in Ban Yan Non Prai
- Wat Mai Ratsongtham (วัดใหม่ราษฎร์ทรงธรรม in Ban Rai)
