= Ban Bang Krathum =

Ban Bang Krathum บ้านบางกระทุ่ม
- Town
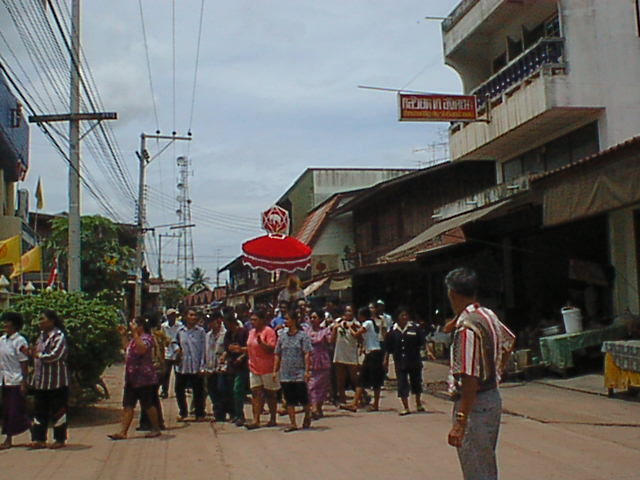
- Buddhist parade in downtown Ban Bang Krathum

- Location within Thailand
- Coordinates: 16°34′00″N 100°18′00″E
- Country: Thailand
- Province: Phitsanulok
- Amphoe: Bang Krathum
- Subdistrict: Bang Krathum
- Time zone: UTC+7 (Thailand)
- Postal code: 65110

Ban Bang Krathum (Thai: บ้านบางกระทุ่ม) is a town in the Bang Krathum Subdistrict of Bang Krathum District of Phitsanulok Province, Thailand.

== Etymology ==
The first element ban (Thai: บ้าน) means village. The second element bang (Thai: บาง) means village or settlement. The third element krathum (Thai: กระทุ่ม) means bur-flower tree (Anthocephalus chinensis).

== Geography ==
Ban Bang Krathum is situated in the Nan Basin, which is part of the Chao Phraya Watershed.

== Temples ==
Ban Bang Krathum is home to the following two Theravada Buddhist temples:

- Wat Bang Krathum (located downtown)
- Wat Huay Gaew (Thai: วัดห้วยแก้ว, Crystal Stream Temple)
