= Wat Nang Phaya, Phitsanulok =

Buddhist temple in Phitsanulok, Thailand

Coordinates: 16.8224°N 100.2621°E

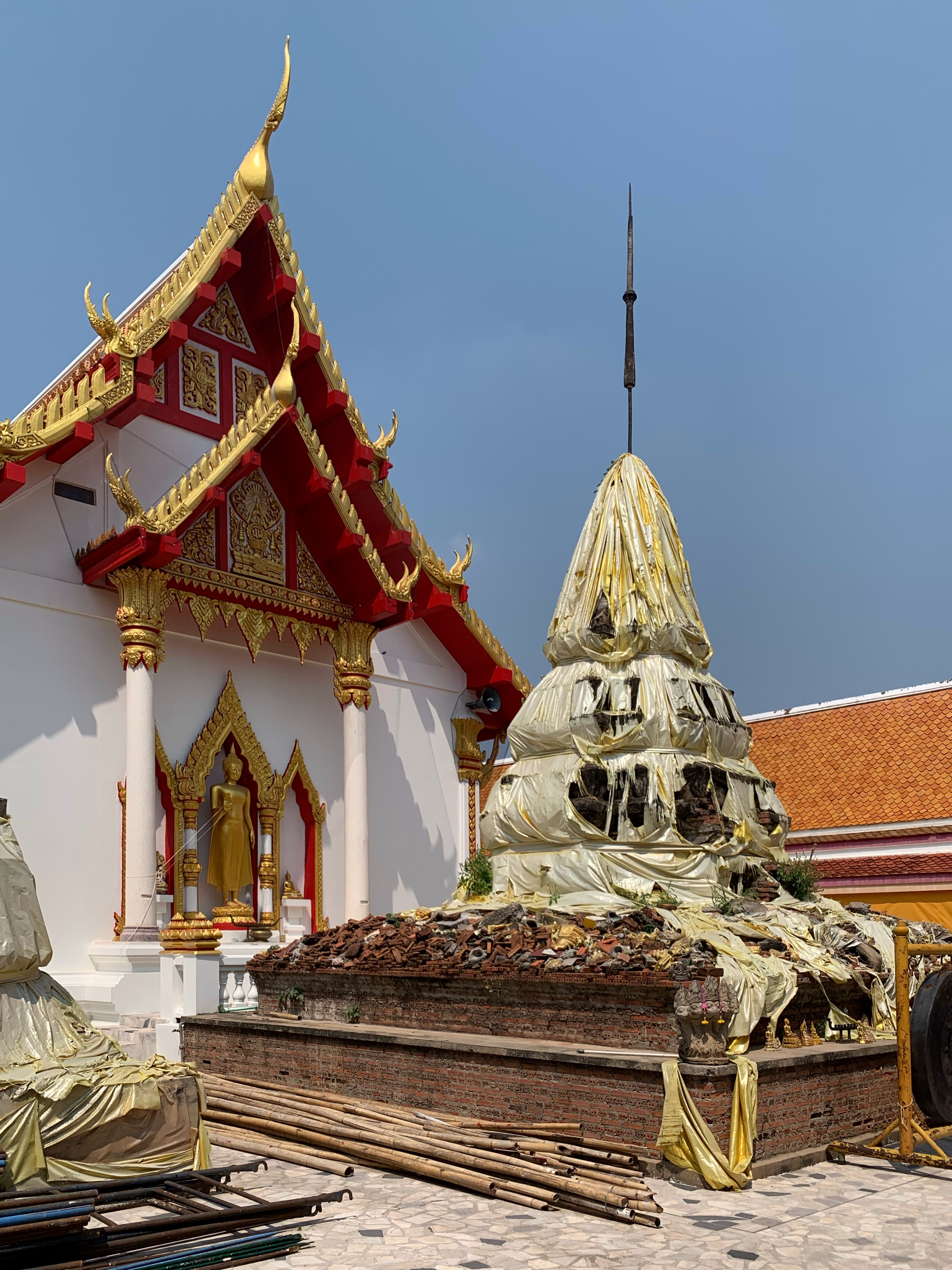
Wat Nang Phaya

Wat Nang Phaya is a Buddhist temple in Phitsanulok, Thailand.

== Geography ==
Wat Nang Phaya is located on the eastern bank of the Nan River. Wat Nang Phaya links to the campus of Wat Ratchaburana.

== History ==
Wat Nang Phaya is said to have been built when Phitsanulok was ruled by King Trailokanat (1448–1488).

== Features ==
Wat Nang Phraya has no temple, but it is known for its Phrara Nang Phya, which are votive tablets found within the pagoda's repository.
