= Ban Sam Ruen =

Ban Sam Ruen บ้านสามเรือน (English: Village of Three Faces)
- Village
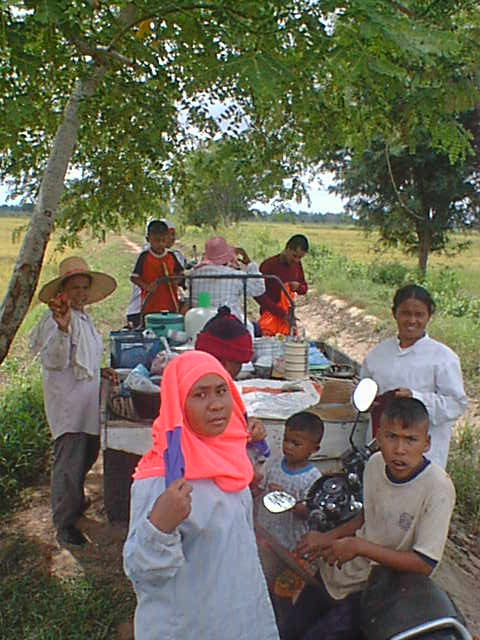
- Family working on rice farm in Ban Sam Ruen

- Location within Thailand
- Coordinates: 16°35′47″N 100°21′02″E
- Country: Thailand
- Province: Phitsanulok
- Amphoe: Bang Krathum
- Tambon: Nakhon Pa Mak

Area
  - Total: 5.4 km^{2} (2.1 sq mi)
  - Agricultural use: 4.0 km^{2} (1.5 sq mi)

Population (2005)
  - Total: 1,340
- Time zone: UTC+7 (Thailand)
- Postal code: 65110
- Chief watercourse: Wang Thong River

Ban Sam Ruen (Thai: บ้านสามเรือน) is a village in the Nakhon Pa Mak subdistrict of Amphoe Bang Krathum District of Phitsanulok Province, Thailand.

== Etymology ==
The first element ban (Thai: บ้าน) means village. The second element sam (Thai: สาม) means three. The third element ruen (Thai: เรือน) can either mean dwelling place, or it can be a classifier used to count oblique faces such as the faces of a gem or faces of clocks. The meaning of the name as a whole loosely means Village of Three Faces.

== Geography ==
Ban Sam Ruen is located in the south-west portion of Nakhon Pa Mak on the Wang Thong River. The Wang Thong flows into Sam Ruen from the north-west and out of the village to the south. A canal which leads to Ban Grong Greng runs out of Ban Sam Ruen from the north-east. The resulting pattern divides the land into three plots. At Ban Grong Greng, the Sam Ruen Canal makes its first split, one extension turning west toward Ban Dongphayom, and the other extending north. The canal has many branches, and forms a complex canal system which provides irrigation for much of Nakhon Pa Mak. Ban Sam Ruen is within the Nan River watershed.

== Economy ==
Ban Sam Ruen was home to the largest market in Phitsanulok until 1898 when the market moved to Ban Wang Thong further north-east along the Wang Thong River. Today, Ban Sam Ruen is a rural rice-farming village.

== Wat Rat Samosom ==
Wat Rat Samosom, (Thai: วัดราษฎร์สโมสร) or colloquially Wat Sam Ruen, is a modern Theravada Buddhist temple located in Ban Sam Ruen. It is the temple at which villagers and residents of the nearby village of Ban Dongphayom conduct ordinary religious activities and ceremonies. Funerals are not held at Wat Sam Ruen, but rather at nearby Wat Grung See Jayrin.

== Wat Rat Samosom School ==
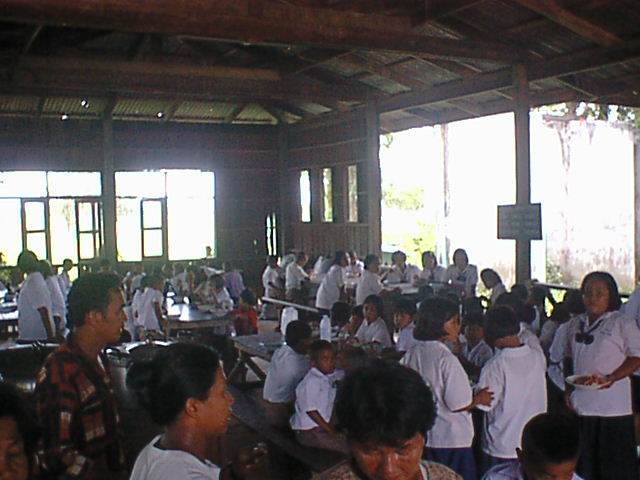
Students in Cafeteria at Sam Ruen Elementary School

Within Ban Sam Ruen is Wat Rat Samosom School, referred to by most as Sam Ruen School. Wat Rat Samosom School is Sam Ruen's elementary and high school, which provides basic education for villagers of Ban Sam Ruen and neighboring villages in Nakhon Pa Mak. It is one of four elementary schools in Nakhon Pa Mak, and the subdistrict's only high school. It was strictly an elementary school until around 1990, when an additional high school building was added. Prior to 1990, Nakhon Pa Mak children who wished to attend high school were required to find private transportation to the nearest high school in Mueang Bang Krathum. Each day at Sam Ruen School begins with the raising of the Thai flag, conducted by one male and one female student, while the remainder of the student and faculty body sing the Thai national anthem. Classes include Thai language, mathematics, Thai history, civics, sewing and agriculture. Lunch is provided by parents of the students who take turns volunteering in the preparation and food service. There are recreational and intramural sports activities on the soccer field and basketball court, but no competitive sports teams.
