= Tha Tan =

Tha Tan ท่าตาล (English: Sugar-Palm Dock)
- Subdistrict
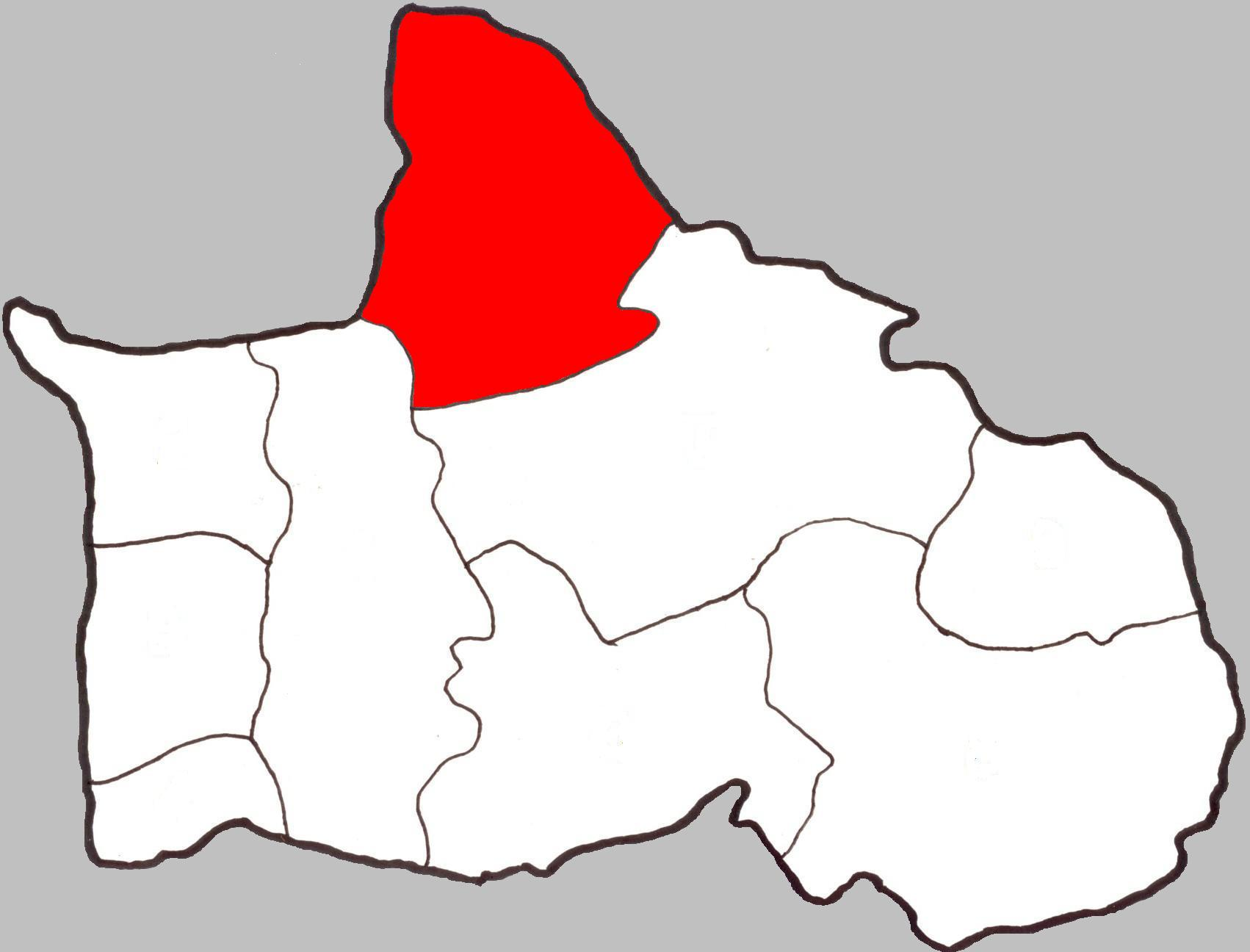
- Location of Tha Tan in the district
- Coordinates: 16°38′00″N 100°20′00″E
- Country: Thailand
- Province: Phitsanulok
- District: Bang Krathum District

Population (2005)
  - Total: 7,021
- Time zone: UTC+7 (ICT)
- Postal code: 65110
- Geocode: 650505

Tha Tan (Thai: ท่าตาล) is a sub-district (tambon) in the Bang Krathum District of Phitsanulok Province, Thailand.

== Geography ==
Tha Tan is the northernmost sub-district in Bang Krathum, bordering Wang Nam Khu of Mueang Phitsanulok District to the north-west, Wang Thong District to the north-east, Nakhon Pa Mak to the south and Bang Krathum to the south-west.

Tha Tan lies in the Nan Basin, which is part of the Chao Phraya Watershed. The Wang Thong River flows through the sub-district.

== History ==
Originally named Bang Phi (บางผี), it was renamed Tha Tan in 1939.

== Administration ==
The sub-district is divided into nine smaller divisions (mubans), (villages). Tha Tan is administered by a tambon administrative organization (TAO). The muban in Tha Tan are enumerated as follows:

No.	English	Thai
1	Ban Bang Phi	บ้านบางผี
2-3 (Note: A village with two mubans.)	Ban Tha Tan	บ้านท่าตาล
4	Ban Boo Yai	บ้านบุใหญ่
5	Ban Wangsan	บ้านวังสาร
6	Ban Tha Dindaeng	บ้านท่าดินแดง
7	Ban Nern Sa'at	บ้านเนินสะอาด
8	Ban Thung Noi	บ้านทุ่งน้อย
9	Ban Gai Rawa	บ้านไก่ระว้า

== Temples ==
Tha Tan is home to the following eight temples:

- Wat Pak Khlong (Thai: วัดปากคลอง, Temple of the Mouth of the Canal) in Ban Tha Dindaeng
- Wat Tha Tan (Thai: วัดท่าตาล) in Ban Tha Tan
- Wat Tan Phlong (Thai: วัดตาลโพลง, Bright Sugar-Palm Temple) in Ban Boo Yai
- วัดมงคลพุทธาราม in Ban Wangsan
- Wat Wangsan (Thai: วัดวังสาร) in Ban Wangsan
- Wat Luang (Thai: วัดหลวง) in Ban Bang Phi
- Wat Thung Noi (Thai: วัดทุ่งน้อย) in Ban Tung Noi
- Wat Nern Sa'at (Thai: วัดเนินสะอาด) in Ban Nern Sa'at
