= Wat Ratchaburana, Phitsanulok =

Buddhist temple in Phitsanulok, Thailand

Coordinates: 16°49′18.20″N 100°15′40.18″E

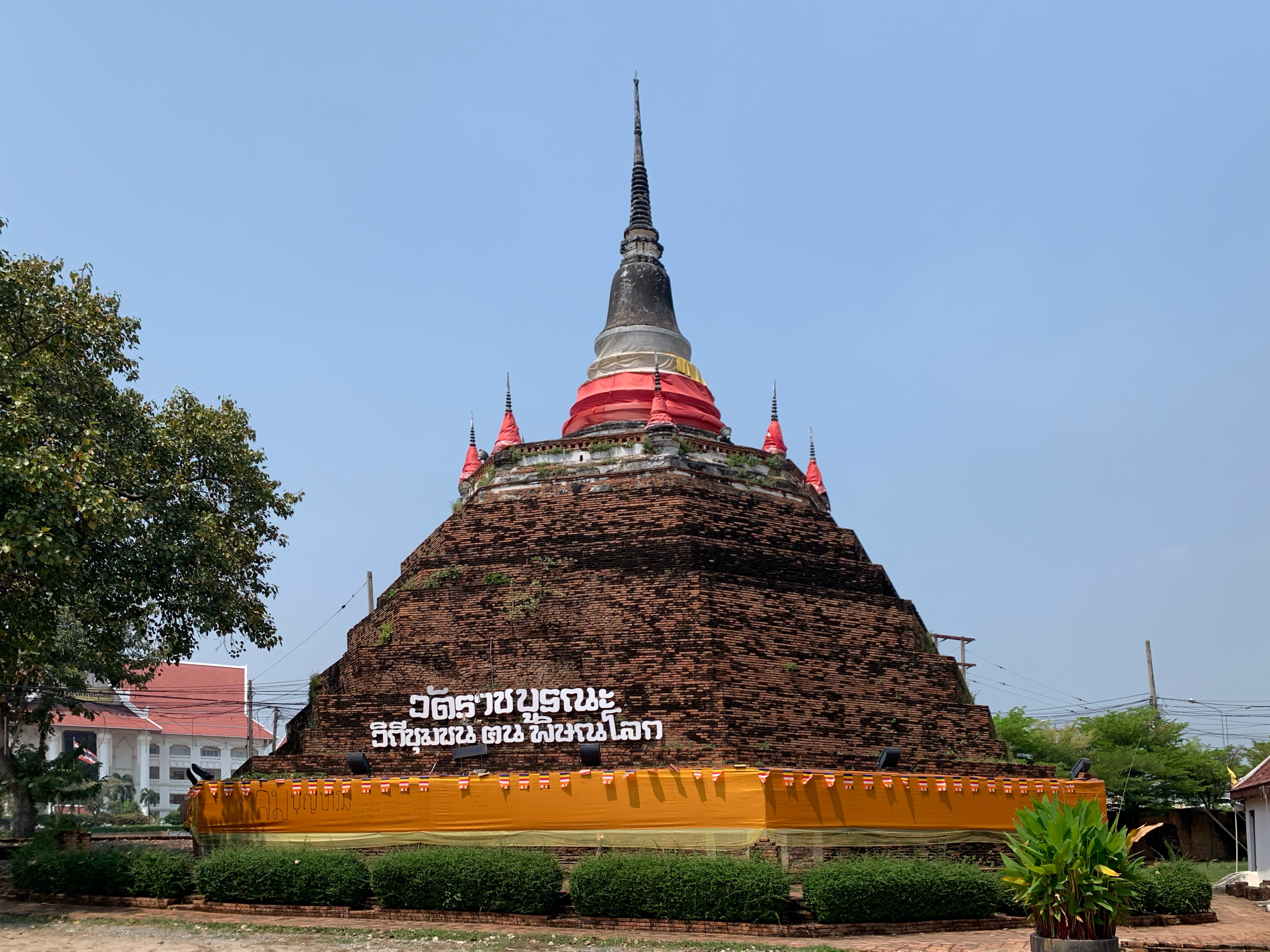
Wat Ratchaburana, Phitsanulok

Wat Ratchaburana (Thai: วัดราชบุรณะ) is a Buddhist temple in Phitsanulok, Thailand.

== Geography ==
Wat Ratchaburana lies in the center of Phitsanulok, on the west bank of the Nan River, and to the south of the main temple of the province, Wat Phra Sri Rattana Mahatat Woramahawihan. Wat Ratchaburana is connected to Wat Nang Phaya.

== History ==
In 1463, King Boromma Trailokanat (1448-1488) of Ayutthaya moved the capital of his empire to Phitsanulok, and ordered the establishment of new temples, as well as the restoration of existing older ones. Wat Ratchaburana dates back to the beginning of his reign in Phitsanulok. He ordered the construction a chedi and other buildings on the temple's campus. Today, the impressive chedi is nearly all that remains of the original construction. However, other buildings have been constructed among the ruins. At one time, King Mongkut (Rama IV) headed a construction and restoration project of the temple.

== Features ==
The most significant feature is the nearly 600-year-old chedi, dating back to the time of King Trailokanat. The chedi is said to enshrine relics of the Buddha. However, there is no access to the chedi's spire. Wat Ratchaburana has an unusual roof structure. Also, in the nearby shrine, a very nice Sukhothai style Buddha figure is situated amidst red painted columns. In addition, the shrine houses a showroom displaying old coins, bank notes, musical instruments and glass objects. The walls are decorated with artistic frescoes. An old bell tower, Hor Rakhang, as well as a recently constructed shrine with a garden and six swan figures stand beside the monastery. There is also a meeting hall on the campus.
