= Wat Ta Yom River =

Location
- Country: Thailand

Physical characteristics
- Source
  - location: Noen Maprang District, Phitsanulok Province
- Mouth
  - location: Nan River in Phichit

The Wat Ta Yom River (Thai: แคววัดตายม) is a tributary of the Nan River in Thailand.

== Geography ==
This river of many names originates in the mountains of the Noen Maprang District of Phitsanulok Province where it is referred to as the Chomphu River (Thai: คลองชมภู). It then flows through the Wang Thong District where it is referred to as the Tha Muen Ram River (Thai: แควน้ำท่าหมื่นราม), then flows through the Bang Krathum District, and through Wat Ta Yom, where it is referred to as the Wat Ta Yom River. It discharges into the Nan River in Phichit via the Tha Luang Canal (Thai: คลองท่าหลวง) at 16°26′27″N 100°21′21″E.

== Etymology ==
- Chomphu River: The first element chom (Thai: ชม) means praise or admire; the second element phu (Thai: ภู) means mountain, hence Glorious Mountain River
- Tha Muen Ram River: The first element tha (Thai: ท่า) means wharf, port or dock; the second element muen (Thai: หมื่น) means the number 10,000; the third element ram (Thai: ราม) comes from aram (Thai: อาราม, borrowed from Pali) meaning temple or monastery, hence Harbor of 10,000 Temples River
- Wat Ta Yom River: The first element wat (Thai: วัด) means temple; the second element ta (Thai: ตา) means eye; the third element yom (Thai: ยม) means weep, hence River of the Weeping Eye Temple
- Tha Luang Canal: The first element tha (Thai: ท่า) means wharf, port or dock; the second element luang (Thai: หลวง) means great or superior, hence Great Harbour Canal

All of the above names of the river derive from the names of places through which the river flows or to which it leads. The river does not appear to have a geographically independent name of its own.

== Tributaries ==
The following is a tree demonstrating the points at which the major tributaries of the Tha Luang River branch off from the main river and from each other.

- Gulf of Thailand
  - Chao Phraya River (Drains into the Gulf of Thailand via the Chao Phraya Delta)
    - Nan River (Joins the Chao Phraya at Nakhon Sawan)
      - Tha Luang River (Joins the Nan at 16°26′27″N 100°21′21″E in Phichit)
        - Wat Ta Yom River
          - Tha Muen Ram River
            - Chomphu River
