= Phai Lom, Phitsanulok =

Phai Lom ไผ่ล้อม (English: Surrounded by Bamboo)
- Tambon
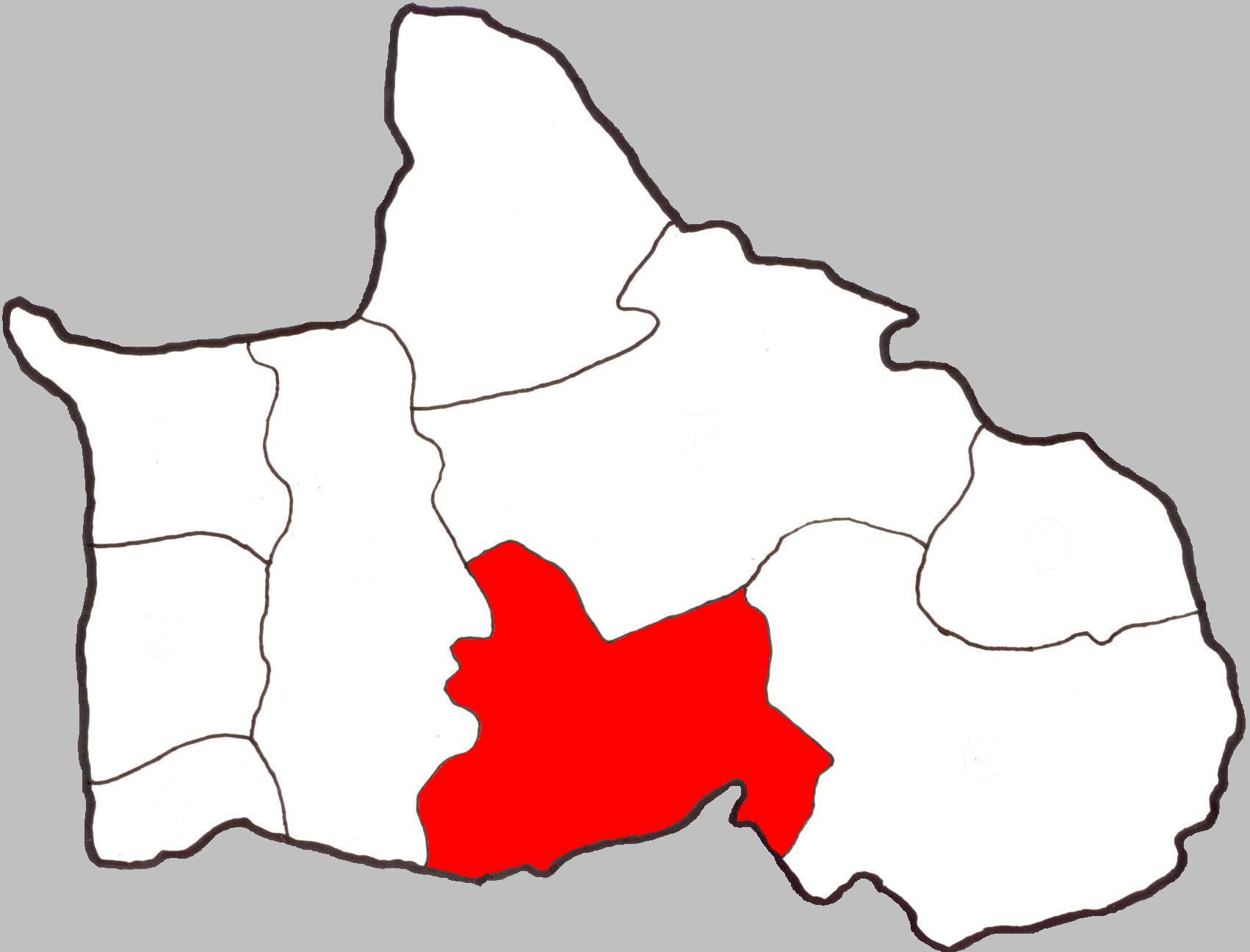
- Location of Phai Lom in the district
- Coordinates: 16°34′00″N 100°21′00″E
- Country: Thailand
- Province: Phitsanulok
- District: Bang Krathum

Population (2005)
  - Total: 4,756
- Time zone: UTC+7 (ICT)
- Postal code: 65110
- Geocode: 650506
- Chief roadway: Route 1114
- Chief watercourse: Wang Thong River

Phai Lom (Thai: ไผ่ล้อม) is a subdistrict (tambon) in the Bang Krathum District of Phitsanulok Province, Thailand.

== Geography ==
Phai Lom borders Nakhon Pa Mak to the north, Noen Kum to the east, Phichit Province to the south, and Bang Krathum to the west. Phai Lom lies in the Nan Basin, which is part of the Chao Phraya Watershed. The Wang Thong River flows through Phai Lom.

== Administration ==
The subdistrict is divided into 11 smaller divisions called (muban), which roughly correspond to the villages in Phai Lom. There are six villages, several of which occupy multiple muban. Phai Lom is administered by a Tambon administrative organization (TAO). The muban in Phai Lom are enumerated as follows:

No.	English	Thai
1	Ban Poh Daen	บ้านโพธิ์แดน
2-5	Ban Tha Na	บ้านท่านา
6	Ban Nong Bon	บ้านหนองบอน
7-9	Ban Tha Makam	บ้านท่ามะขาม
10	Ban Beung Chang	บ้านบึงช้าง
11	Ban Yangthon	บ้านยางโทน

== Temples ==
Phai Lom is home to the following five temples:

- Wat Apai Supraron Pum (Thai: วัดอภัยสุพรรณภูมิ) in Ban Beung Chang
- Wat Tha Na (Ban Tha Na Village Temple) in Ban Tha Na
- Wat Tha Makam (Ban Tha Makam Village Temple) in Ban Tha Makam
- Wat Beung Chang (Ban Beung Chang Village Temple) in Ban Beung Chang
- Wat Phai Lom in Ban Beung Chang
