= Nakhon Pa Mak =

Nakhon Pa Mak นครป่าหมาก (English: Betel palm Forest City)
- Tambon
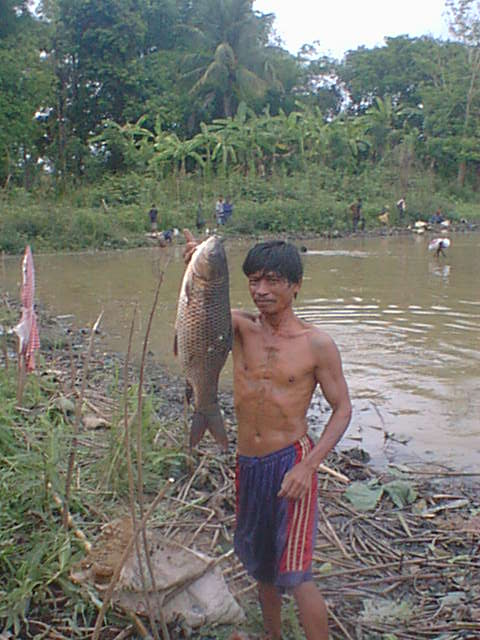
- Fishing in Nakhon Pa Mak

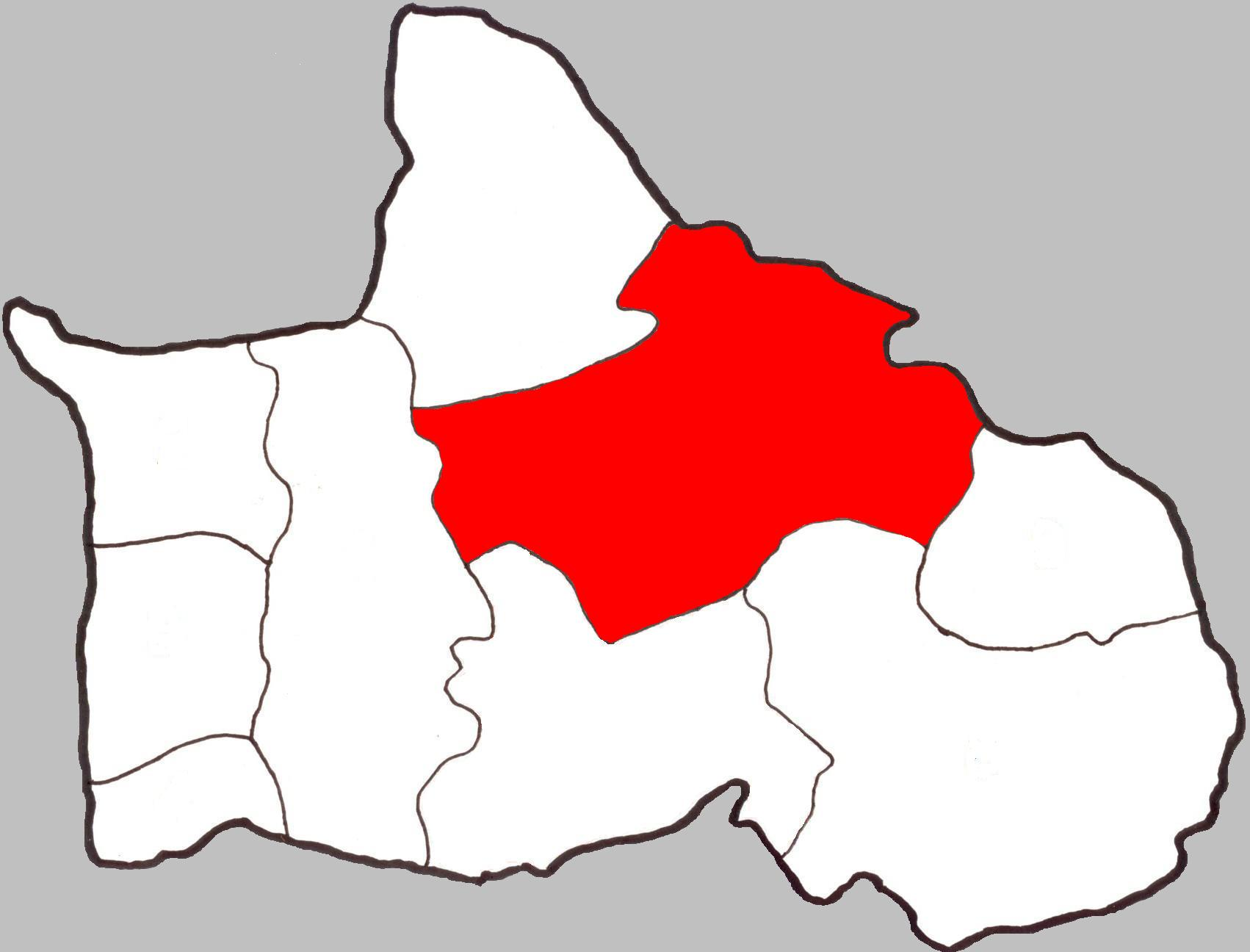
- Location of Nakhon Pa Mak in the district
- Coordinates: 16°35′45″N 100°20′53″E
- Country: Thailand
- Province: Phitsanulok
- District: Bang Krathum

Area
  - Total: 58 km^{2} (22 sq mi)
  - Agricultural use: 41 km^{2} (16 sq mi)
- Elevation: 41 m (135 ft)

Population (2005)
  - Total: 6,589
  - Density: 113/km^{2} (290/sq mi)
  - Male: 3,210
  - Female: 3,379
- Time zone: UTC+7 (ICT)
- Postal code: 65110
- Geocode: 650507
- Chief roadway: Paved road leading to Route 1114
- Chief watercourse: Wang Thong River

Nakhon Pa Mak (Thai: นครป่าหมาก) is a rural subdistrict (tambon) in the Bang Krathum District of Phitsanulok Province, Thailand.

== Etymology ==
The first element nakhon (Thai: นคร) means 'town' or 'city'. The second element pa (Thai: ป่า) means 'forest'. The third element mak (Thai: หมาก) means 'betel palm'. The name as a whole would be loosely translated as 'betel palm forest city'. Betel palms are indigenous to the area and inhabitants chew on the betel nuts which contain a natural stimulant, much like chewing tobacco.

== Geography ==
Nakhon Pa Mak primarily consists of flat lowlands in the Nan Basin, which is part of the Chao Phraya Watershed. The Wang Thong River flows through Nakhon Pa Mak at the villages of Ban Sam Ruen and Bang Kranoi. Nakhon Pa Mak borders Tha Tan to the north-west, Mae Raka of Wang Thong District to the north-east, Wat Ta Yom to the east, Phai Lom to the south, and Bang Krathum to the west.

== History ==
Originally named Sam Ruean (สามเรือน), it was renamed to Nakhon Pa Mak in 1939.

== Administration ==
The subdistrict is divided into 13 smaller divisions called (muban), which roughly correspond to the villages within Nakhon Pa Mak. There are eight villages, several of which occupy more than one muban. Nakhon Pa Mak is administered by a Tambon administrative organization (TAO). The muban in Nakhon Pa Mak are enumerated as follows:

No.	English	Thai
1	Ban Bueng Lam	บ้านบึงลำ
2	Ban Bang Kranoi	บ้านบางกระน้อย
3, 5 & 12	Ban Sam Ruen	บ้านสามเรือน
4	Ban Gao	บ้านเก่า
6 - 8 & 13	Ban Grong Greng	บ้านโกรงเกรง
9	Ban Laemphrathat	บ้านแหลมพระธาตุ
10	Ban Laemkrok	บ้านแหลมครก
11	Ban Dongphayom	บ้านดงพยอม

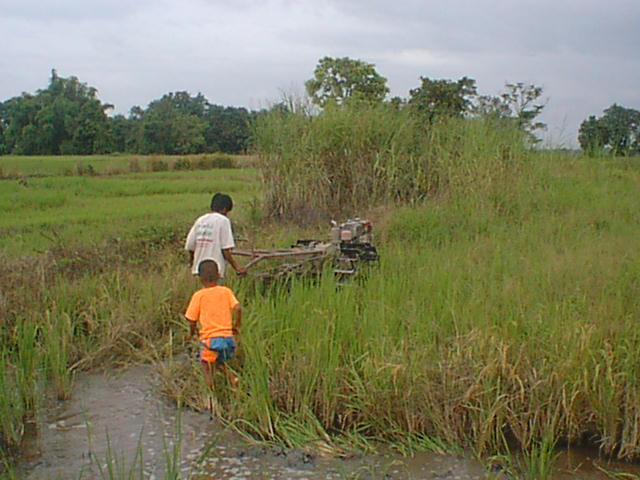
Rice Farming Method Used by Farmers in Nakhon Pa Mak

== Education ==
Nakhon Pa Mak has four elementary schools (Bueng Lam School, Wat Rat Samosom School, Wat Grung See Jayrin School and Wat Laemphrathat School). Wat Rat Samoson School in Ban Sam Ruen was strictly an elementary school until around 1990, when an additional high school building was added. Prior to 1990, Nakhon Pa Mak children who wished to attend high school were required to utilize private transportation to the nearest high school in Ban Bang Krathum. There are no other high schools and no colleges or universities in Nakhon Pa Mak. There is also no school bus service.

== Settlements ==
From most populated to least, the villages of Nakhon Pa Mak are: Ban Grong Greng (pop. 1881), Ban Sam Ruen (pop. 1340), Ban Bueng Lam (pop. 1050), Ban Dongphayom (pop. 678), Bang Kranoi (pop. 567), Ban Laemphrathat (pop. 565), Ban Gao (pop. 299) and Ban Laemkrok (pop. 209). From greatest land area to least, the villages rank as follows: Ban Grong Greng (20.9 km^{2}), Ban Laemphrathat (10.4 km^{2}), Ban Dongphayom (6.2 km^{2}), Ban Bueng Lam (5.9 km^{2}), Ban Sam Ruen (5.4 km^{2}), Ban Bang Kranoi (4.4 km^{2}), Ban Gao (2.8 km^{2}) and Ban Laemkrok (1.8 km^{2}).

=== Temples ===
A complete list of active temples in Nakhon Pa Mak is as follows:

- Wat Bunglam in Ban Bueng Lam is used primarily for funeral ceremonies.
- Wat Grung See Jayrin (has a historic chedi)
- Wat Laemphrathat
- Wat Rat Samosom
- Wat See Bun Mayiga Ram (Thai: วัดศรีบุญมายิการาม, Temple of the Renowned Merit of the Noble Lady) in Ban Laemkrok
- Wat Dongphayom

All of the temples in Nakhon Pa Mak are of the Theravada Buddhist denomination.

== Attractions ==
- Wat Grung See Jayrin
- Ban Dongphayom Boat Race
