= Bang Krathum district =

Bang Krathum บางกระทุ่ม
- District
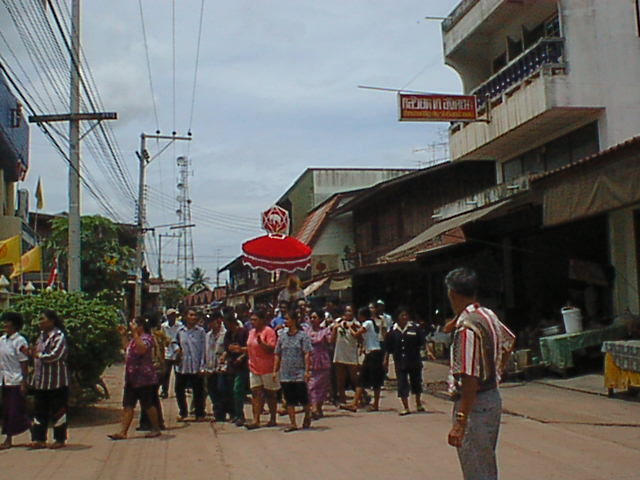
- A street in Ban Bang Krathum

- District location in Phitsanulok province
- Coordinates: 16°35′7″N 100°18′22″E
- Country: Thailand
- Province: Phitsanulok
- Seat: Bang Krathum
- District established: 1927

Area
  - Total: 447.0 km^{2} (172.6 sq mi)

Population (2025)
  - Total: 44,532
  - Density: 100/km^{2} (260/sq mi)
- Time zone: UTC+7 (ICT)
- Postcode: 65110
- Calling code: 055
- ISO 3166 code: TH-6505
- LAO code: 02650501

Bang Krathum (Thai: บางกระทุ่ม, pronounced [bāːŋ krā.tʰûm]) is a district (amphoe) in the southern part of Phitsanulok province, lower northern region of Thailand.

== Toponymy ==
Bang (Thai: บาง) means 'village' or 'settlement'. The second element krathum (Thai: กระทุ่ม) means 'bur-flower tree' (Neolamarckia cadamba).

== Geography ==
Neighboring districts are (from the north clockwise), Mueang Phitsanulok and Wang Thong of Phitsanulok Province; Sak Lek, Mueang Phichit, and Sam Ngam of Phichit province. Most of Bang Krathum lies within the Nan Basin, although a narrow strip of land on the west side of the district lies within the Yom Basin. Both basins are part of the Chao Phraya Watershed. The Nan, Wang Thong and Wat Ta Yom Rivers flow through Bang Krathum, and the Yom River forms part of the border between Bang Krathum and Phichit.

== History ==
The minor district (king amphoe) Bang Krathum was created in 1927 by combining three sub-districts from Mueang Phitsanulok District and three sub-districts from Pa Mak District, the present-day Wang Thong District. Originally a subordinate of Mueang Phitsanulok District, it was upgraded to a full district in 1946.

== Administration ==
=== Provincial government ===
The district is divided into 9 subdistricts (tambons), which are further subdivided into 88 villages (mubans), as of 2025: 44,532 people of 17,812 families.

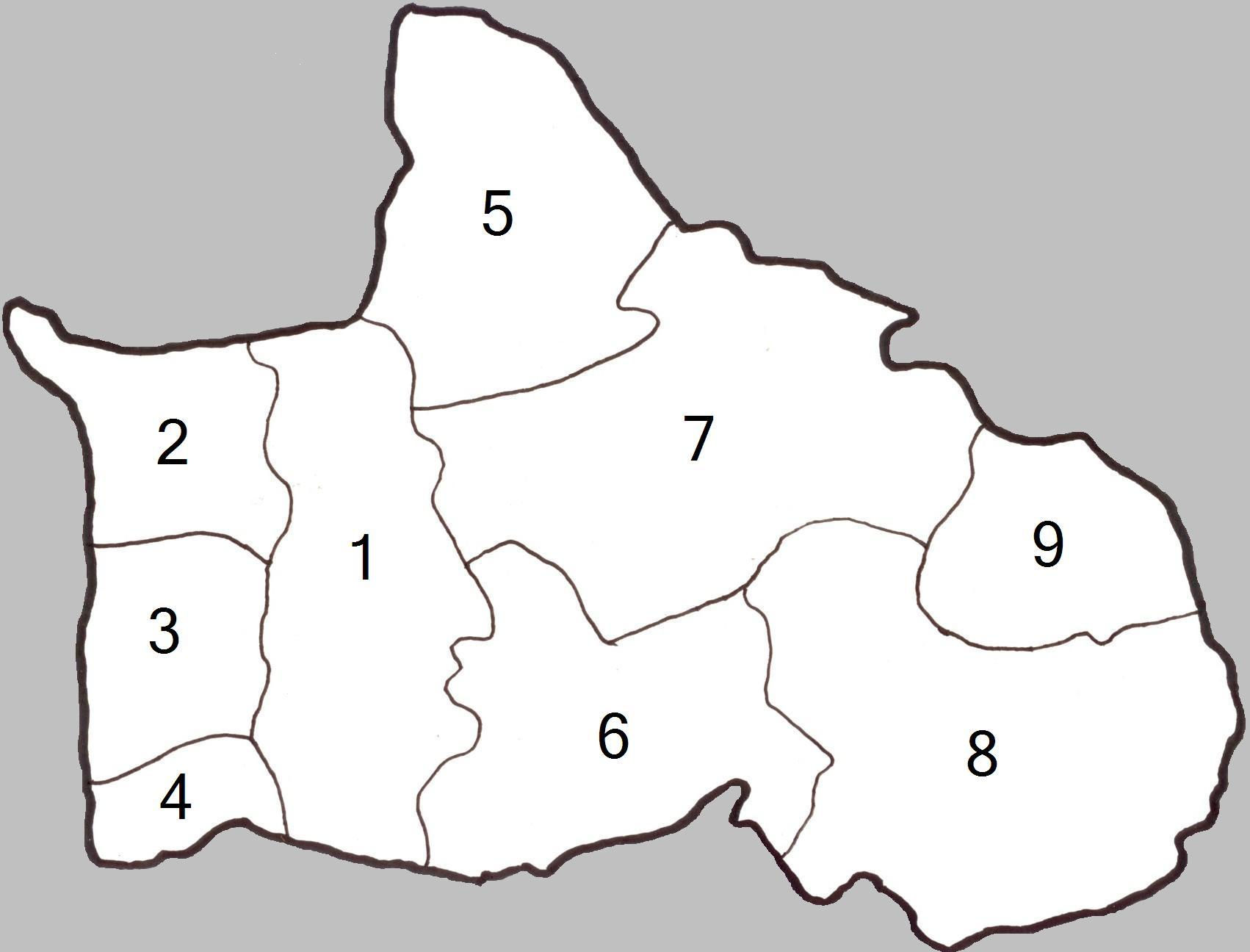
Map of subdistricts

No	Subdistrict	Population	Villages
1	Bang Krathum	6,253	9
2	Ban Rai	4,264	10
3	Khok Salut	3,024	10
4	Sanam Khli	2,376	6
5	Tha Tan	6,572	9
6	Phai Lom	4,486	11
7	Nakhon Pa Mak	6,196	13
8	Noen Kum	7,241	11
9	Wat Ta Yom	4,120	9
	Total population	44,532	88

=== Local government ===
There are four subdistrict municipalities (thesaban tambon). Bang Krathum municipality covers villages 3–5 and Huai Kaeo municipality is responsible for the remaining area of Bang Krathum subdistrict. Noen Kum municipality covers Noen Kum and Wat Ta Yom subdistricts. Sanam Khli municipality covers the whole Sanam Khli subdistrict.

Noen Kum subdistrict municipality	Population
Noen Kum subdistrict	7,241
Wat Ta Yom subdistrict	4,120
Total Population	11,361

Subdistrict municipality	Population
Huai Keao	4,818
Sanam Khli	2,376
Bang Krathum	1,435

Further there are five subdistrict administrative organizations (SAO), which all cover the whole same-named subdistrict.

== Economy ==
Bang Krathum's chief crops are rice, sugar cane, fruits, oranges, tamarinds, cassavas, soy beans and mung beans.

In Bang Krathum, there are a number of "banana factories" that package an assortment of dried fruits including dried bananas and tamarinds that are sold in Thailand and exported worldwide. There is also a large sugar cane production plant in the district owned by Phitsanulok Sugar Co., Ltd.

== Settlements ==
Of the 51 villages in Bang Krathum District, those that occupy multiple mubans are as follows:

- Ban Bang Krathum
- Ban Dong Mee
- Ban Grong Greng
- Ban Kok Salud
- Ban Khok Sanam
- Ban Noen Kum
- Ban Sam Ruen
- Ban Sanam Khli
- Ban Tha Makam
- Ban Tha Na
- Ban Tha Tan
- Ban Wat Kwang
- Ban Wat Ta Yom
- Ban Yan Yao

== Temples ==
There are 44 Theravada Buddhist temples in the district. At least one, Wat Grung See Jayrin, has a historic chedi.

== Attractions ==
- Ban Dongphayom Boat Race

== Flooding ==
In 2006, there were reported cases of leptospirosis among residents of Bang Krathum, contracted due to standing water.
