= Tha Thong, Phitsanulok =

District in Thailand

Coordinates: 16.8582°N 100.2291°E

Tha Thong ท่าทอง
- Tambon
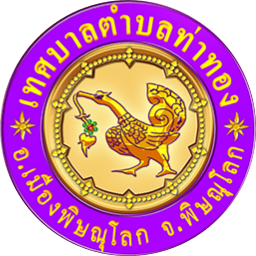
- Seal
- Interactive map of Tha Thong
- Country: Thailand
- Province: Phitsanulok
- District: Mueang Phitsanulok
- Subdistrict Adm.Org.-SAO: 30 March 1996
- Subdistrict municipality: 24 August 2012

Government
  - Type: Subdistrict municipality

Area
  - Total: 23.7 km^{2} (9.2 sq mi)

Population (2022)
  - Total: 14,388
  - Density: 607/km^{2} (1,570/sq mi)
- Time zone: UTC+7 (ICT)
- Postal code: 65000
- Calling code: 055
- ISO 3166 code: TH-65010500
- LAO code: 05650113
- Website: www.thathong-pilok.go.th

Tha Thong (Thai: ท่าทอง) is a subdistrict in the Mueang Phitsanulok District of Phitsanulok Province, Thailand. In this subdistrict is Lotus's Phitsanulok 2 shopping center.

== Geography ==
The topography of Tha Thong subdistrict is fertile lowlands. The subdistrict is bordered to the north by Ban Krang subdistrict, to the east by Wat Chan, Nai Mueang and Bueng Phra subdistricts, to the south by Tha Pho subdistrict and to the west by Bang Rakam district. Tha Thong subdistrict lies in the Nan Basin, which is part of the Chao Phraya Watershed. The Nan river flows through the subdistrict. An irrigation canal (Huai Nong Khlong Bueng) flows from Chom Thong subdistrict, through Phlai Chumphon and Wat Chan subdistricts to Tha Thong subdistrict and is an important water source for agricultural consumption and also a raw water source to produce village water supply. The area to the west of this irrigation canal is for agriculture and the area to the east of this irrigation canal is for urbanization.

== History ==
Ban Wat Chulamani was historically a thriving commercial Nan River port used to transport crops to Bangkok in exchange for currency and gold. King Borommatrailokkanat (1448-1488), accompanied by more than 2,000 followers, was ordained as a monk at Wat Chulamani in 1461. On 30 March 1996 Tha Thong Subdistrict Administrative Organization-SAO (ongkan borihan suan tambon) was established. Upgrade to subdistrict municipality (thesaban tambon) was on 24 August 2012.

== Administration ==
The administration of Tha Thong subdistrict is responsible for an area that covers 14,810 rai ~ 23.7 square kilometres (9.2 sq mi) and consists of eleven administrative villages, as of 2025: 14,388 people and 6,830 households.

=== Provincial government ===
Tha Thong subdistrict with villages

Village	English	Thai	People	Households
Moo1	Ban Krok	บ้านกรอก	2,472	1,174
Moo2	Ban Wat Chulamani	บ้านวัดจุฬามณี	1,981	1,165
Moo3	Ban Tha Thong Tawan Ook	บ้านท่าทองตะวันออก	1,411	624
Moo4	Ban Jung Nang	บ้านจูงนาง	958	397
Moo5	Ban Tha Thong Tawan Tok	บ้านท่าทองตะวัตก	1,109	505
Moo6	Ban Rai	บ้านไร่	1,938	893
Moo7	Ban Nong Hua Yang	บ้านหนองหัวยาง	1,246	482
Moo8	Ban Wang Krabak	บ้านวังกระบาก	1,273	747
Moo9	Ban Phai Wong	บ้านไผ่วง	725	249
Moo10	Ban Ton Wa	บ้านต้นหวัา	661	330
Moo11	Ban Jung Nang Nok	บ้านจูงนางนอก	614	264

=== Local government ===
Tha Thong Subdistrict Municipality (Thai: เทศบาลตำบลท่าทอง, romanized: thetsaban tambon Tha Thong) covers the whole Tha Thong subdistrict.

== Temples ==
Tha Thong subdistrict is home to the following active temples, where Theravada Buddhism is practiced by local residents.

Temple name	Thai	Location
Wat Chulamani	วัดจุฬามณ์	Moo2
Wat Si Rattanaram	วัดศรีรัตนาราม	Moo4
Wat Sawang Arom	วัดสว่างอรมณ์	Moo6
Wat Nong Hua Yang	วัดหนองหัวยาง	Moo7

== Infrastructure ==
=== Education ===
The following elementary/secondary schools are located in Tha Thong.

==== Primary/secondary education ====
- Wat Chulamani school - Moo2
- Tha Thong Pittayakhom school - Moo4
- Wat Si Rattanaram school - Moo4
- Wat Sawang Arom school - Moo6
- Phitsanulok Pittayakhom school - Moo8
- Ban Nong Hua Yang school - Moo9

==== Child development center ====
- Tha Thong municipality child development center - Moo6

=== Healthcare ===
There is Tha Thong health-promoting hospital in Moo5.

=== Transportation ===
The subdistrict is the hub of highways 117 (Phitsanulok - Nakhon Sawan route), 126 (Phitsanulok bypass road) and national roads 1063 (to Bang Krathum district), 1065 (to Bang Rakam district).

=== Electricity ===
All households in Tha Thong subdistrict municipality have access to the electricity grid of Provincial Electricity Authority (PEA).

=== Communications ===
All households in Tha Thong subdistrict municipality have access to the fixed and mobile telephone network.
There is one postoffice in Lotus's Extra - Moo6.

=== Waterworks ===
6,200 households, out of a total of 6,519 households, have access to the water network of Provincial Waterworks Authority (PWA). All households have access to the village water supply system in every village.

== Economy ==
Residential use of the subdistrict, approximately 60%, is mainly on both sides of the Nan River. Agriculture occupies 35%, of which rice, vegetables, fruit crops and fish farming. Other areas count for 5%.

== Government institutions ==
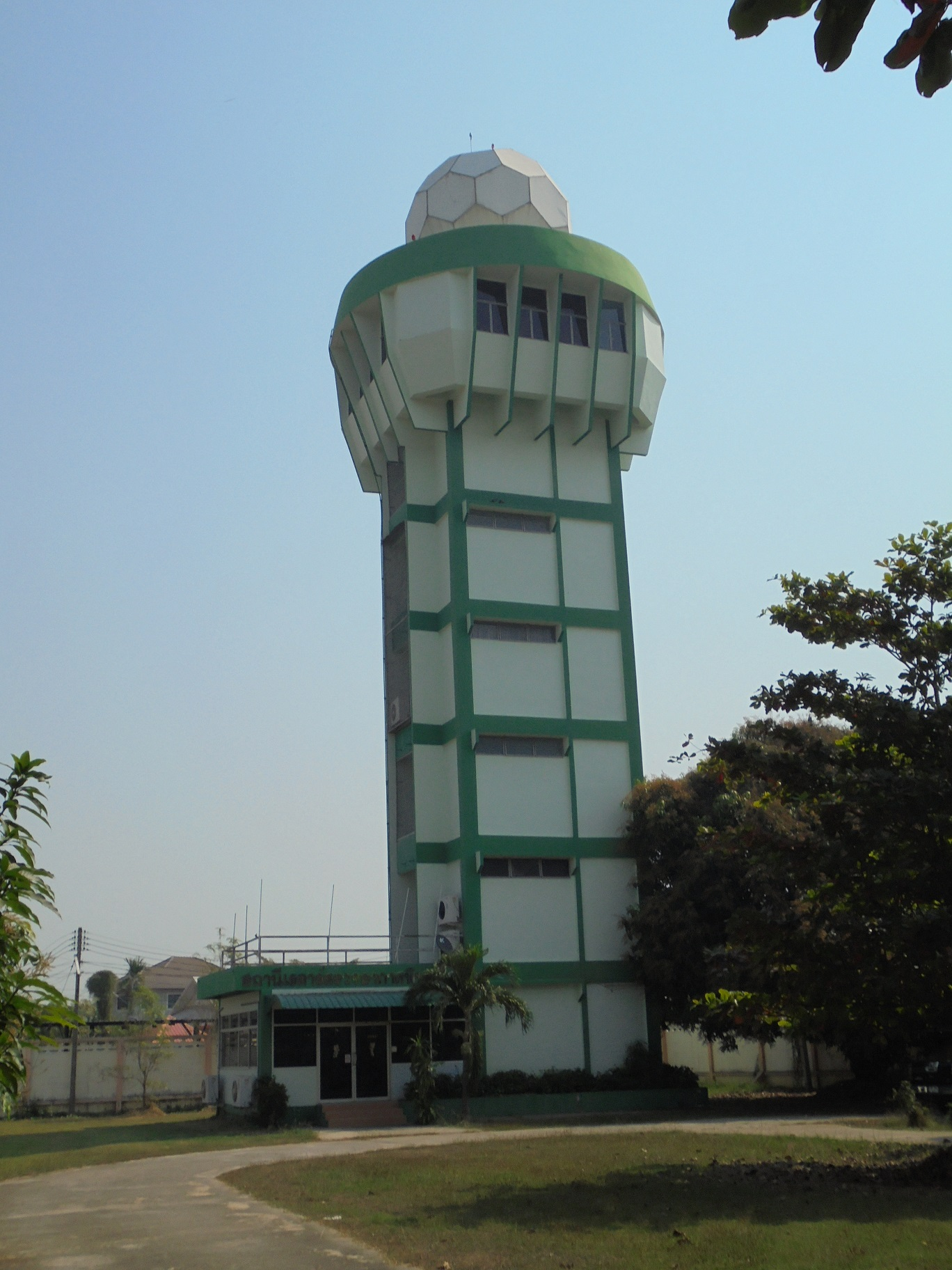
Chulamani station

- Protected Areas Regional Office 11 - PARO 11 (Phitsanulok) - Moo8
- Tha Thong subdistrict municipality - Moo6
- TMD weather station Chulamani - Phitsanulok - Moo2

The following government institutions are mainly situated along highway 117.

- Office of Phitsanulok Province Election Commission - Moo10
- Phitsanulok Administrative Court - Moo8
- Phitsanulok Provincial Cooperative - Moo8
- Regional Irrigation Office 3 - Moo8
- Regional Livestock Office 6 - Moo8
- Yom Nan Operation and Maintenance Project - Moo8

== Attraction ==
- Wat Chulamani is known for its corncob-shaped tower or prang and its unique, ornate and elaborate plaster designs. It is also the oldest standing temple in Phitsanulok province.
