= Tha Pho, Phitsanulok =

Coordinates: 16.8582°N 100.2291°E

Tha Pho ท่าโพธิ์
- Tambon
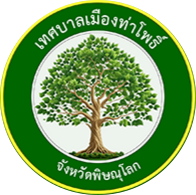
- Seal
- Interactive map of Tha Pho
- Country: Thailand
- Province: Phitsanulok
- District: Mueang Phitsanulok

Government
  - Type: Town municipality

Area
  - Total: 50.1 km^{2} (19.3 sq mi)

Population (December 2025)
  - Total: 15,875
  - Density: 316/km^{2} (820/sq mi)
- Time zone: UTC+7 (ICT)
- Postal code: 65000
- Calling code: 055
- ISO 3166 code: TH-65010600
- LAO code: 04650114
- Website: www.thapho.go.th

Tha Pho (Thai: ท่าโพธิ์) is a subdistrict in the Mueang Phitsanulok District of Phitsanulok Province, Thailand. In this subdistrict is Naresuan University with more than 22,000 students.

== Geography ==
The topography of Tha Pho subdistrict is fertile lowlands, with swamps and marshes. The subdistrict is bordered to the north by Tha Thong subdistrict, to the east by Bueng Phra subdistrict, to the southeast by Wat Phrik subdistrict and to the west by Bang Rakam district. Tha Pho subdistrict lies in the Nan Basin, which is part of the Chao Phraya Watershed. The Nan river flows through the subdistrict. An irrigation canal (Huai Nong Khlong Bueng) flows from Chom Thong subdistrict, through Phlai Chumphon, Wat Chan and Tha Thong subdistricts to Tha Pho subdistrict and is an important water source for agricultural consumption and also a raw water source to produce village water supply. Swamps in the northeast are Thung Luek and Thung Soka, in the southwest are Thung Nong O, Khlong Nong Lek, Bueng Chan and Thung Nong Luang. Some of these swamps are used by government agencies, such as Naresuan university is located in Thung Nong O and Phraya Chakri military camp is located in Thung Soka.

== Administration ==
The administration of Tha Pho subdistrict is responsible for an area that covers 31,300 rai ~ 50.1 square kilometres (19.3 sq mi) and consists of eleven administrative villages, as of December 2025: 15,875 people and 11,043 households.

=== Central government ===
Tha Pho subdistrict with villages

Village	English	Thai	People	Households
Moo1	Ban Wang Somsa	บ้านวังส้มซ่า	918	362
Moo2	Ban Wang Somsa	บ้านวังส้มซ่า	1,305	572
Moo3	Ban Wang Won	บ้านวังวน	1,745	902
Moo4	Ban Khlong Khu	บ้านคลองคู	639	242
Moo5	Ban Yang	บ้านยาง	1,076	528
Moo6	Ban Yang En	บ้านยางเอน	1,533	737
Moo7	Ban Tha Pho	บ้านท่าโพธิ์	3,169	4,578
Moo8	Ban Kaek	บ้านแขก	2,725	2,018
Moo9	Ban Khlong Nong Lek	บ้านคลองหนองหล็ก	1,389	533
Moo10	Ban Hua Krathing	บ้านหัวกระทิง	696	261
Moo11	Ban Nai Rai	บ้านในไร	680	310

=== Local government ===
Tha Pho town municipality (Thai: เทศบาลเมืองท่าโพธิ์, romanized: thesaban mueang Tha Pho) covers the whole Tha Pho subdistrict.

== Temples ==
Tha Pho subdistrict is home to the following active temples, where Theravada Buddhism is practiced by local residents.

Temple name	Thai	Location
Wat Sakat Namman	วัดสะกัดน้ำมัน	Moo2
Wat Yang En	วัดยางเอน	Moo5
Wat Chaem Suwan	วัดแจ่มสุวรรณ	Moo6
Wat Khung Wari	วัดคุ้งวารี	Moo8

== Infrastructure ==
=== Education ===
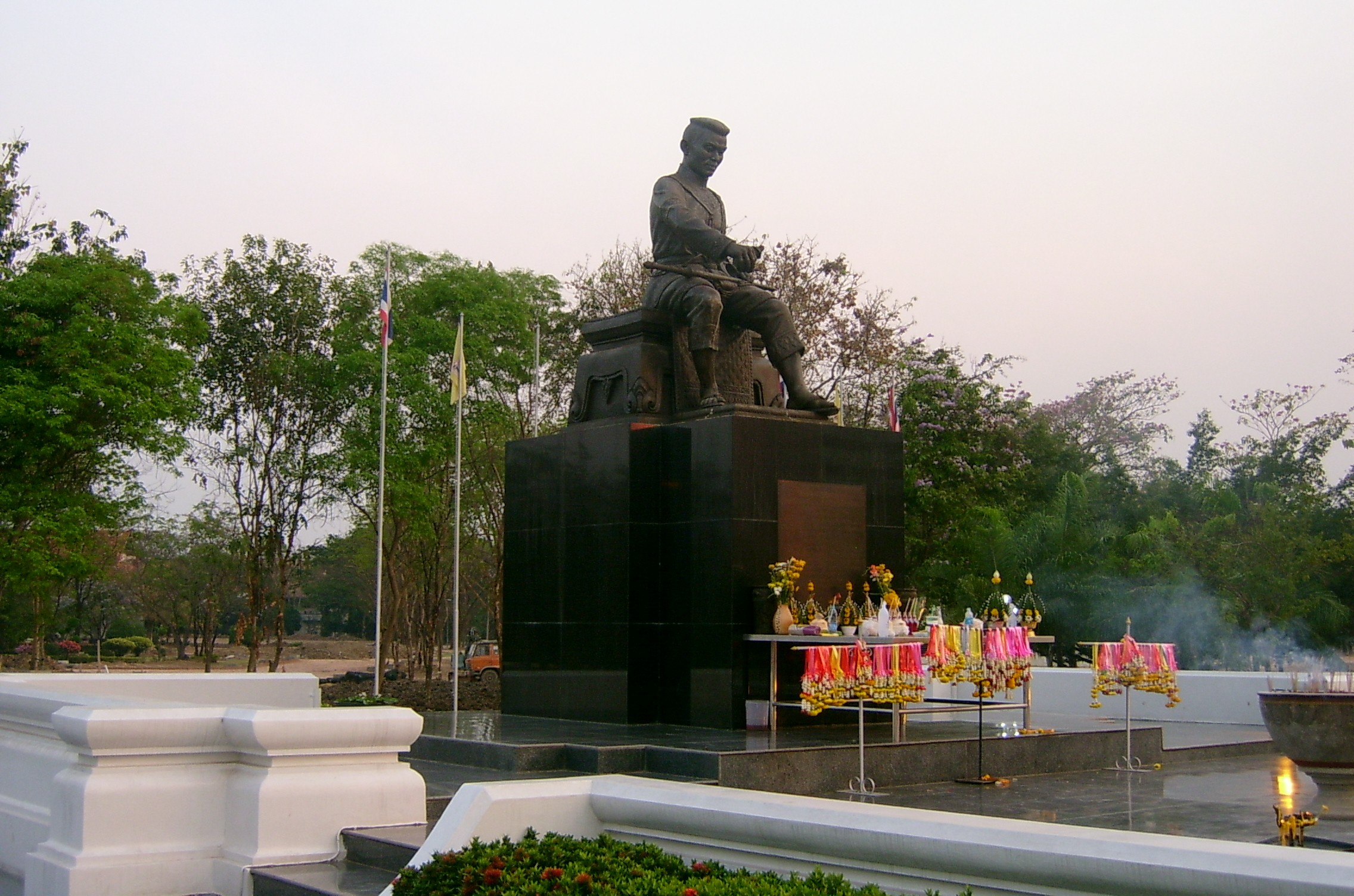
Statue of King Naresuan the Great, Naresuan University

==== Higher education ====
- Naresuan University with 16 faculties, 184 courses and with more than 22,000 students is leader of the universities in Phitsanulok province - Moo9

The following elementary/secondary schools are located in Tha Pho.

==== Primary/secondary education ====
- Wat Sakat Namman school - Moo2
- Wat Yang En school - Moo5
- Wat Khung Wari school - Moo8
- Ban Khlong Nong Lek school - Moo9

==== Child development center ====
- Ban Wang Somsa child development center - Moo2
- Ban Wang Won child development center - Moo3
- Ban Yang En child development center - Moo6
- Ban Khung Wari child development center - Moo8
- Ban Khlong Nong Lek child development center - Moo9

=== Healthcare ===
- Naresuan University Hospital is a primary teaching hospital and the super tertiary care medical center in the lower northern region of Thailand - Moo9
- Tha Pho health-promoting hospital - Moo9.

=== Transportation ===
The subdistrict is the hub of highways 117 (Phitsanulok - Nakhon Sawan route), 126 (Phitsanulok bypass road) and national roads 1063 (to Bang Krathum district), 1065 (to Bang Rakam district).

=== Electricity ===
All villages in Tha Pho subdistrict have access to the electricity grid of Provincial Electricity Authority (PEA).
But there are still households without electricity.

=== Communications ===
All households in Tha Thong subdistrict municipality have access to the fixed and mobile telephone network.
There are five postoffices in subdistrict.

=== Waterworks ===
9,450 households, out of a total of 10,266 households, have access to the water network of Provincial Waterworks Authority (PWA).
In every village all households have access to the village water supply system.

== Economy ==
The economy of Tha Pho subdistrict is mainly based on crop (rice and corn) and livestock (cattle, chickens, ducks and pigs) production. Secondary are trading and fisheries.
The following companies play a role in the employment service:

- Honda Thailand - Moo6
- Mitsubishi Motors - Moo6
- Nitiboon Co., Ltd. (BMW and MINI) - Moo9
- Viriyah Insurance Co., Ttd. - Moo6
