= Ban Mai, Phitsanulok =

Ban Mai บ้านใหม่
- Thesaban tambon
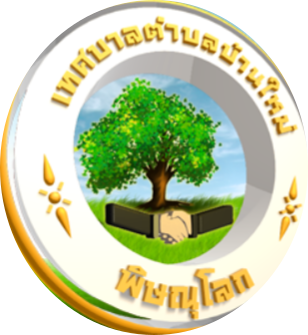
- Seal
- Country: Thailand
- Province: Phitsanulok
- District: Mueang Phitsanulok

Government
  - Type: Subdistrict municipality

Area
  - Total: 150.9 ha (373 acres)
- hectare: 100 x 100 meter

Population (2025)
  - Total: 1,856
  - Density: 1,230/km^{2} (3,200/sq mi)
- Time zone: UTC+7 (ICT)
- Postal code: 65000
- Calling code: 055
- ISO 3166 code: TH-65010200 + TH-65010400
- LAO code: 05650104
- Website: www.banmaicity.go.th

Ban Mai (Thai: บ้านใหม่) is a subdistrict municipality in the Mueang Phitsanulok District of Phitsanulok Province, Thailand. In 2025 it had a population of 1,856 and 830 households.

== Geography ==
The topography of Ban Mai subdistrict municipality (thesaban tambon) is flat plains and is located in the lower northern part of Thailand. The municipality is bordered to the north by Wat Phrik subdistrict, to the east by Wat Phrik and Wang Nam Khu subdistricts, to the south by Wang Nam Khu subdistrict and to the west by Ngio Ngam and Wat Phrik subdistricts. Ban Mai municipality lies in the Nan Basin, which is part of the Chao Phraya Watershed. The Nan River flows on the boundary of Wat Phrik and Ngio Ngam subdistricts.

== History ==
Originally, Ban Mai sanitation (sukhaphiban) encompassed parts of Wat Phrik and Wang Nam Khu subdistricts. The 1999 Act changed the status of sanitation to subdistrict municipality. On 24 February 1999 it was published in the Government Gazette, volume 116, section 9 Kor. This was effective from 25 May 1999. Since then, Ban Mai is no longer part of Wat Phrik and Wang Nam Khu subdistricts. There is no "Ban Mai subdistrict".

== Administration ==
=== Provincial government ===
De facto there is no Ban Mai subdistrict in Mueang Phitsanulok district.
Northern part falls under the administration of the Wang Nam Khu subdistrict, and southern part under the administration of the Wat Phrik subdistrict.

=== Local government ===
The administration of Ban Mai subdistrict municipality (Thai: เทศบาลตำบลบ้านใหม่, romanized: thetsaban tambon Ban Mai) is responsible for an area that covers 943 rai ~ 150.9 hectares (372 acres) and as of 2025: 1,856 people and 830 households. The municipality is split into two districts (khet).

Ban Mai with districts

District	Population	Households	Iso code
Khet 1	829	373	TH-65010200
Khet 2	1,027	457	TH-65010400

There are five communities (chumchon), although not directly elected by the local citizens, that provide advice and recommendations to the municipality.

Ban Mai with communities

Community	English	Thai	rai	hectare	acres
Chumchon 1	Nong Mai Phatthana	น้องใหม่พัฒนา	430	68.8	170
Chumchon 2	Arun Sawatdee	อรุณสวัสดิ์	239	38.2	94
Chumchon 3	Phithak Tham	พิทักษ์ธรรม	160	25.6	63
Chumchon 4	Samakhkhee Tham	สามัคคีธรรม	61	9.8	24
Chumchon 5	Ruam Tjai Phak	ร่วมใจภักดิ์	53	8.5	21

== Temple ==
Ban Mai subdistrict municipality is home to Wat Ban Mai, where Theravada Buddhism is practised by local residents:

== Economy ==
Most of the population worked in trade.

- trade - 50%
- agriculture - 20%
- general employee - 15%
- civil servants - 10%
- private business - 5%

== Education ==
The following schools are located in Ban Mai subdistrict municipality:

- Wat Ban Mai school
- Wat Bang Sai school

== Healthcare ==
There is Ban Mai health-promoting hospital.

== Transport ==
=== Roads ===
- National road 1063, Phitsanulok-Bang Krathum

=== Railway ===
There is Ban Mai railway station. In 2019 there were sold 13,356 tickets.

== Electricity ==
All households in Ban Mai municipality have access to the electricity grid of Provincial Electricity Authority (PEA).

== Waterworks ==
All households in Ban Mai municipality have access to the water network of Provincial Waterworks Authority (PWA).

== Communications ==
All households in Ban Mai municipality have access to the fixed and mobile telephone network.
