= Phitsanulok (disambiguation) =

Phitsanulok may refer to one of five places/things in the country of Thailand:

- the city Phitsanulok
- Phitsanulok Province
- Mueang Phitsanulok district
- Monthon Phitsanulok, a former administrative entity
- Phitsanulok College
