= Wang Nam Khu =

Coordinates: 16.666°N 100.25°E

Wang Nam Khu วังน้ำคู
- Tambon
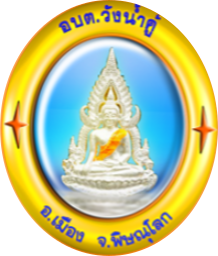
- Seal
- Interactive map of Wang Nam Khu
- Country: Thailand
- Province: Phitsanulok
- District: Mueang Phitsanulok

Government
  - Type: Subdistrict Administrative Organization (SAO)

Area
  - Total: 24.0 km^{2} (9.3 sq mi)

Population (2025)
  - Total: 4,875
  - Density: 203/km^{2} (530/sq mi)
- Time zone: UTC+7 (ICT)
- Postal code: 65000
- Calling code: 055
- ISO 3166 code: TH-65010200
- LAO code: 06650119
- Website: www.wangnumku.go.th

Wang Nam Khu (Thai: วังน้ำคู้) is a subdistrict in the Mueang Phitsanulok District of Phitsanulok Province, Thailand. In 2025 it had a population of 4,875 and 2,123 households. The economy of this subdistrict is mainly based on agriculture.

== Geography ==
The topography of Wang Nam Khu subdistrict is flat plains and is located in the lower northern part of Thailand. The subdistrict is bordered to the north by Wat Phrik subdistrict, to the east by Bang Krathum district, to the south by Bang Krathum district and to the west by Ngio Ngam subdistrict. Wang Nam Khu subdistrict lies in the Nan Basin, which is part of the Chao Phraya Watershed. The Nan River flows on the boundary of Wang Nam Khu and Ngio Ngam subdistricts.

== Administration ==
=== Provincial government ===
The administration of ฺWang Nam Khu subdistrict (tambon) is responsible for an area that covers 15,002 rai ~ 24.0 square kilometres (9.3 sq mi) and consists of eight administrative villages (muban). As of 2025: 4,875 people and 2,123 households.

Wang Nam Khu with villages

Village	English	Thai	People	Households
Moo1	Ban Wang Yang	บ้านวังยาง	609	224
Moo2	Ban Pak Phing Tawan Ork	บ้านปากพิงตะวันออก	539	202
Moo3	Ban Pak Don	บ้านปากดอน	494	214
Moo4	Ban Bang Kwan Ma	บ้านบางขวัญม้า	477	214
Moo5	Ban Khung Wang	บ้านคุ้งวัง	835	413
Moo6	Ban Bang Sai	บ้านบางทราย	876	395
Moo7	Ban Phai Long Rat Charoen	บ้านไผ่หลงราษฎร์เจริญ	633	290
Moo8	Ban Nong Ya	บ้านหนองหญ้า	412	171

=== Local government ===
Wang Nam Khu Subdistrict Administrative Organization - Wang Nam Khu SAO (Thai: องค์การบริหารตำบลวังน้ำคู, romanized: ongkan borihan suan tambon Wang Nam Khu) covers the entire Wang Nam Khu subdistrict, with the exception of almost the whole village Moo6, Ban Bang Sai, which is governed by Ban Mai subdistrict municipality.

== Temples ==
Wang Nam Khu subdistrict is home to the following active temples, where Theravada Buddhism is practised by local residents:

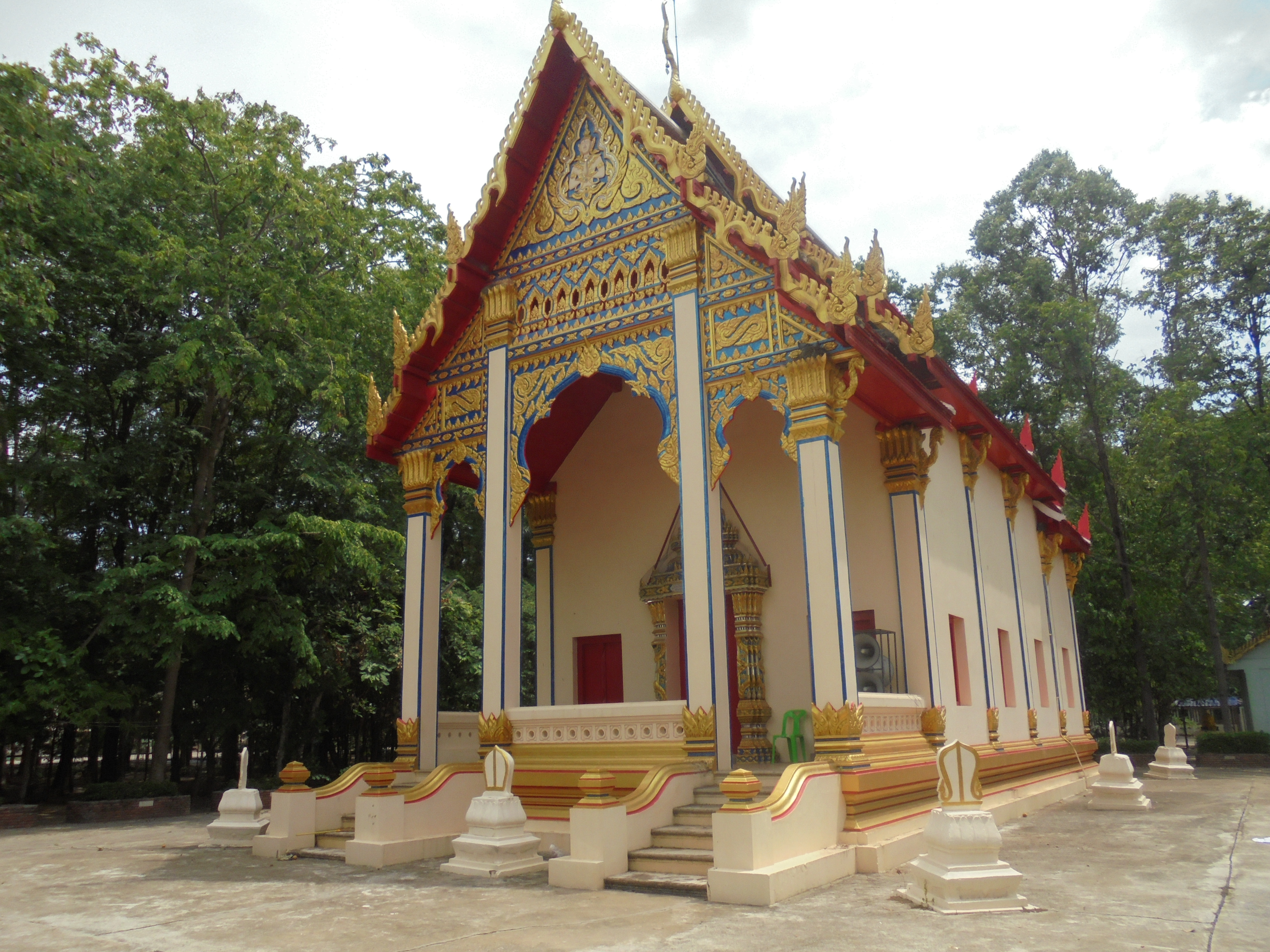
Ubosot of Wat Bang Sai

Temple name	Thai	Location
Wat Pak Phing Tawan Ork	วัดปากพิงตะวันออก	Moo2
Wat Pak Don	วัดปากดอน	Moo3
Wat Bang Sai	วัดบางทราย	Moo6
Wat Phai Long Rat Charoen	วัดไผ่หลงราษฎร์เจริญ	Moo7

== Economy ==
Most of the people are engaged in agriculture of which rice is the main crop.

== Education ==
The following schools are located in Wang Nam Khu subdistrict.

- Ban Wang Yang school - Moo1
- Wang Nam Khu Sueksa school - Moo4
- Ban Nong Ya school - Moo8

== Healthcare ==
- Wang Nam Khu health-promoting hospital in Moo3.

== Transport ==
- National road 1063, Phitsanulok-Bang Krathum

== Electricity ==
All households in Wang Nam Khu subdistrict have access to the electricity grid of Provincial Electricity Authority (PEA).

== Waterworks ==
All households in Wang Nam Ku subdistrict have access to the water network of Provincial Waterworks Authority (PWA).
