= Aranyik subdistrict =

Subdistrict in Phitsanulok Province

Coordinates: 16.814628°N 100.305135°E

Aranyik อรัญญิก
- Tambon
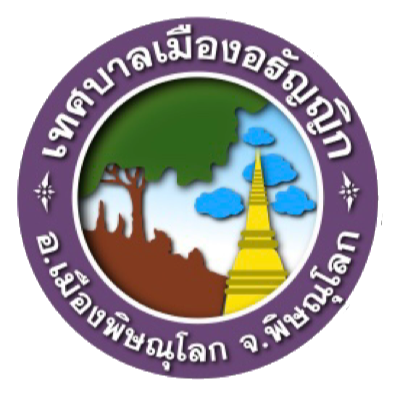
- Seal
- Interactive map of Aranyik
- Country: Thailand
- Province: Phitsanulok
- District: Mueang Phitsanulok

Government
  - Type: Town-municipality

Area
  - Total: 30.8 km^{2} (11.9 sq mi)

Population (2022)
  - Total: 29,776
  - Density: 966/km^{2} (2,500/sq mi)
- Time zone: UTC+7 (ICT)
- Postal code: 65000
- Calling code: 055
- Geocode: 65011700
- Website: www.muangaranyik.go.th

Aranyik (Thai: อรัญญิก) is a subdistrict in the Mueang Phitsanulok District of Phitsanulok Province, Thailand. The area is urban and lowland area without forest. In 2022, it had a population of 29,776 and 14,302 households.

== Geography ==
The topography of Aranyik subdistrict is fertile lowlands and is located in the lower northern part of Thailand. The subdistrict is bordered to the north by Hua Ro subdistrict, to the east by Samo Khae subdistrict, to the south by Bueng Phra subdistrict and to the west by the city of Phitsanulok. Aranyik subdistrict lies in the Nan Basin, which is part of the Chao Phraya Watershed. The Nan river flows west of the subdistrict. Khlong Khok Chang and Khlong Khun are canals dividing the subdistrict with other subdistricts.

== History ==
The legend said that village Aranyik is named after village Aranyik, Phra Nakhon Si Ayutthaya. The warriors, following King Naresuan, made weapons for warfare and named this place after the original village Aranyik.
Aranyik Subdistrict Administrative Organization - SAO (ongkan borihan suan tambon) was established. Subsequent upgrade to town-municipality (thesaban mueang), published 13 March 2012 in Royal Thai Government Gazette, but effective 1 May 2012.

== Administration ==
=== Central government ===
The administration of Aranyik subdistrict (tambon) is responsible for an area that covers 30.8 square kilometres (11.9 sq mi) and consists of ten administrative villages (muban), as of 2022: 29,776 people and 14,302 households.

Aranyik subdistrict with villages

Village	English	Thai	People	Households
Moo1	Ban Khlong Khun	บ้านคลองคูณ	566	178
Moo2	Ban Sanam Bin	บ้านสนามบิน	5,845	3,720
Moo3	Ban Khok Chang	บ้านโคกช้าง	4,334	2,370
Moo4	Ban Aranyik	บ้านอรัญญิก	1,964	728
Moo5	Ban Khlong Mahadthai	บ้านคลองมหาดไทย	4,252	1,784
Moo6	Ban Nong Pla Khao	บ้านหนองปลาค้าว	2,094	875
Moo7	Ban Saphan Sam	บ้านสะพานสาม	3,463	1,771
Moo8	Ban Khok Matum	บ้านโคกมะตูม	2,939	1,255
Moo9	Ban Khok Matum	บ้านโคกมะตูม	2,711	1,205
Moo10	Ban Chao Phae	บ้านชาวแพ	1,100	414

=== Local government ===
Aranyik Town Municipality (Thai: เทศบาลเมืองอรัญิก, romanized: thetsaban mueang Aranyik) covers the whole Aranyik subdistrict and is divided into three districts (khet).

District 1	
Moo3	Ban Khok Chang (partial)
Moo4	Ban Aranyik
Moo5	Ban Khlong Mahadthai
Moo6	Ban Nong Pla Khao
Moo10	Ban Chao Pae

District 2	
Moo1	Ban Khlong Khun
Moo2	Ban Sanam Bin (partial)
Moo3	Ban Khok Chang (partial)

District 3	
Moo2	Ban Sanam Bin (partial)
Moo7	Ban Saphan Sam
Moo8	Ban Khok Matum
Moo9	Ban Khok Matum

== Temples ==
Aranyik subdistrict is home to the following active temples, where Theravada Buddhism is practised by local residents:

Temple name	Thai	Location
Wat Kuean Khan	วัดเขื่อนขันธ์	Moo3
Wat Thep Kunchon	วัดเทพกุญชร	Moo3
Wat Sa Mai Daeng	วัดสระไม้แดง	Moo5
Wat Sa Siliam	วัดสระสี่เหลี่ยม	Moo5
Wat Saphan Sam	วัดสะพานสาม	Moo7

== Economy ==
Because the area is plain lowland with clay soil and sandy loam soil, it is suitable for farming and a variety of crops.
Retail and trading are mainly located along Khok Matum and Mittraphap road (12). The following companies play a role in the employment service:

- HomePro Phitsanulok - Moo10
- Lotus's Phitsanulok - Moo10

== Education ==
The population of Aranyik is completely dependent on the schools in the city of Phitsanulok. There are only two child development centers:

- Kindergarten school (Khok Chang) - Moo3
- Kindergarten school (Nong Pla Khao) - Moo6

== Healthcare ==
There is Aranyik health-promoting hospital in Ban Saphan Sam - Moo7.

== Transport ==
=== Roads ===
- Highway 12 (Phitsanulok - Phetchabun route)
- Highway 126 (Phitsanulok bypass road), around Aranyik

=== Airlines ===
Phitsanulok airport in 2019 handles 689,392 passengers, 5,661 flights and 150,980 kilograms (332,850 lb) of cargo.

Airlines	Destinations
Nok Air	Bangkok–Don Mueang
Thai Air Asia	Bangkok–Don Mueang
Thai Lion Air	Bangkok–Don Mueang

== Attraction ==
- Ruean Phae park (Sawan Ruean Phae) - Moo10

== See also ==
- Last 10 jataka with ten murals of the "10 jataka before the Buddha" of Wat Saphan Sam's sala (pavilion).
- Vessantara Jataka with a gallery of 13 murals of Vessantara Jataka of Wat Saphan Sam's sala.
