= Wat Phrik =

Coordinates: 16.746°N 100.275°E

Wat Phrik วัดพริก
- Tambon
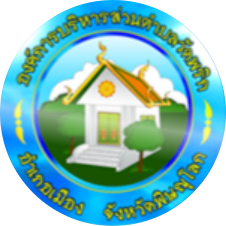
- Seal
- Interactive map of Wat Phrik
- Country: Thailand
- Province: Phitsanulok
- District: Mueang Phitsanulok

Government
  - Type: Subdistrict Administrative Organization (SAO)

Area
  - Total: 58.9 km^{2} (22.7 sq mi)

Population (2022)
  - Total: 8,718
  - Density: 148/km^{2} (380/sq mi)
- Time zone: UTC+7 (ICT)
- Postal code: 65000
- Calling code: 055
- ISO 3166 code: TH-65010400
- LAO code: 06650120
- Website: www.wadprik.go.th

Wat Phrik (Thai: วัดพริก) is a subdistrict in the Mueang Phitsanulok District of Phitsanulok Province, Thailand. The area is urban and lowland area. In 2025 it had a population of 8,718 and 3,742 households.

== Geography ==
The topography of Wat Phrik subdistrict is fertile lowlands and is located in the lower northern part of Thailand. The subdistrict is bordered to the north by Tha Pho and Bueng Phra subdistricts, to the east by Bueng Phra subdistrict and Wang Thong district, to the south by Wang Nam Khu and Ngio Ngam subdistricts and to the west by Bang Rakam district and Tha Pho subdistrict. Wat Phrik subdistrict lies in the Nan Basin, which is part of the Chao Phraya Watershed. The Nan river flows through the subdistrict. An irrigation canal (Huai Nong Khlong Bueng) flows from Chom Thong subdistrict, through Phlai Chumphon, Wat Chan, Tha Thong and Tha Pho subdistricts to Wat Phrik subdistrict and is an important water source for agricultural consumption and also a raw water source to produce village water supply.

== History ==
According to legend, planting chili became interesting to the locals. During the reign of King Naresuan the Great, a camp was set up to fight against the Burmese. Gunpowder ammunition was produced on the campgrounds. One of the components of making gunpowder is chile and chili leaves, which are widely grown in this subdistrict.
Wat Phrik Subdistrict Administrative Organization - SAO (ongkan borihan suan tambon) was established.

== Administration ==
=== Provincial government ===
The administration of Wat Phrik subdistrict (tambon) is responsible for an area that covers 36,806 rai ~ 58.9 square kilometres (22.7 sq mi) and consists of twelve administrative villages (muban), of which five villages (Moo1 to Moo5) are east (tawan ork) and seven villages (Moo6 to Moo12) are west (tawan tok) of this river. As of 2025: 8,718 people and 3,742 households.

Wat Phrik subdistrict with villages

Village	English	Thai	People	Households
Moo1	Ban Mai Tawan Ork	บ้านใหม่ตะวันออก	940	469
Moo2	Ban Tha Rong Tawan Ork	บ้านท่าโรงตะวันออก	556	243
Moo3	Ban Yang Thon Tawan Ork	บ้านยางโทนตะวันออก	899	410
Moo4	Ban In See	บ้านอินทรีย์	604	269
Moo5	Ban Khung Wang-Wang Samsa	บ้านคุ้งวัง-วังสัมซ่า	1,517	712
Moo6	Ban Wat Phrik	บ้านวัดพริก	1,056	440
Moo7	Ban Sao Hin	บ้านเสาหิน	590	220
Moo8	Ban Yang Thon Tawan Tok	บ้านยางโทนตะวันตก	870	328
Moo9	Ban Tha Rong Tawan Tok	บ้านท่าโรงตะวันตก	641	216
Moo10	Ban Tha Rong Tawan Tok	บ้านท่าโรงตะวันตกm	461	194
Moo11	Ban Mai Tawan Tok	บ้านใหม่ตะวันตก	322	142
Moo12	Ban Lam Khai	บ้านลำใค	262	99

=== Local government ===
Wat Phrik Subdistrict Administrative Organization - Wat Phrik SAO (Thai: องค์การบริหารตำบลวัดพริก, romanized: ongkan borihan suan tambon Wat Phrik) covers the entire Wat Phrik subdistrict, with the exception of almost the whole village Moo1, Ban Mai Tawan Ork, which is governed by Ban Mai subdistrict municipality.

== Temples ==
Wat Phrik subdistrict is home to the following active temples, where Theravada Buddhism is practised by local residents:

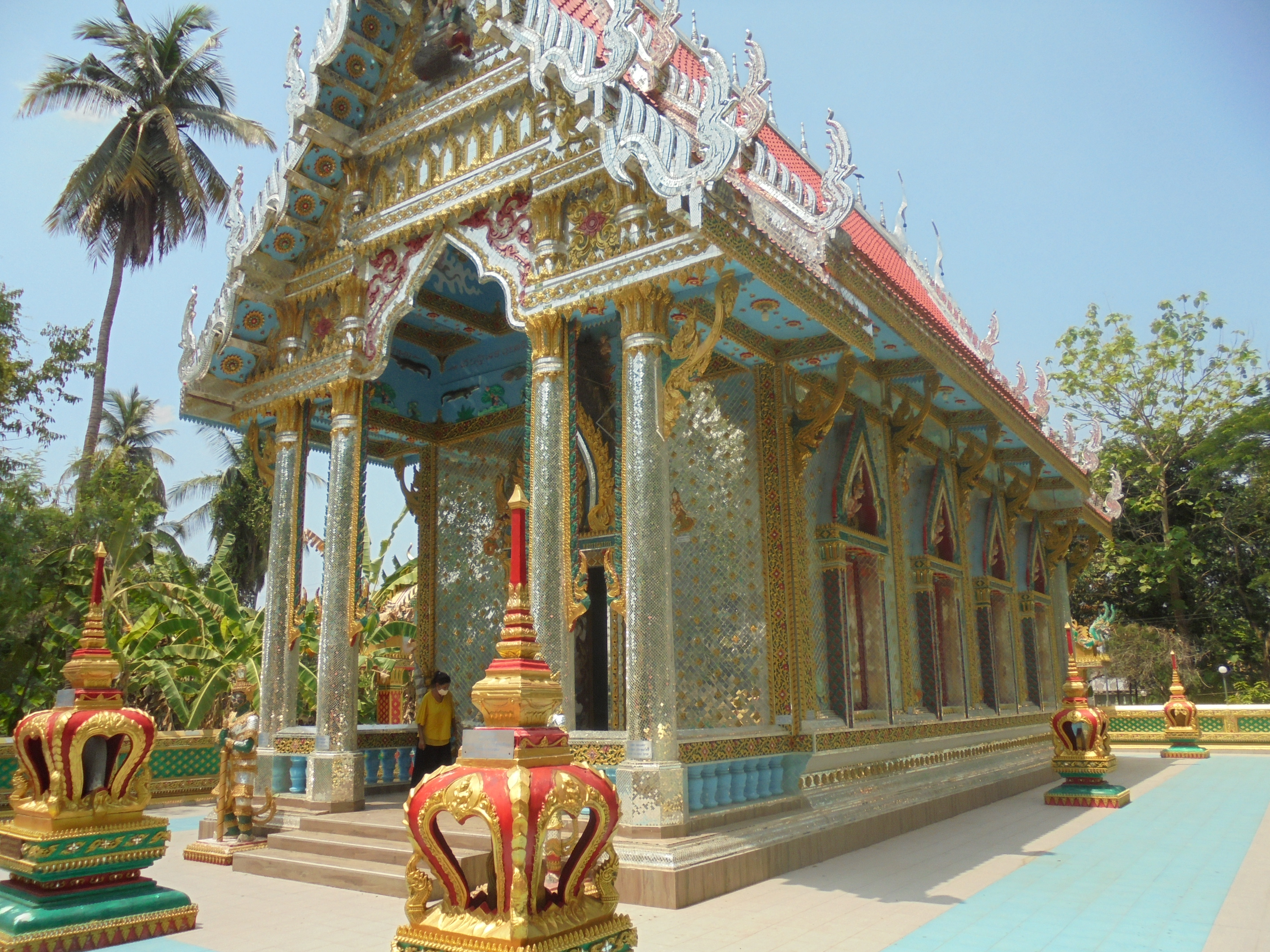
Ubosot of Wat In See, Wat Phrik subdistrict

Temple name	Thai	Location
Wat Tha Rong Tawan Ork	วัดท่าโรงตะวันออก	Moo2
Wat In See	วัดอินทรีย์	Moo4
Wat Lom	วัดหล่ม	Moo5
Wat Sao Hin	วัดเสาหิน	Moo7
Wat Tha Rong Tawan Tok	วัดท่าโรงตะวันตก	Moo10

== Economy ==
The economy of Wat Phrik subdistrict depends on rice farming, trading, general contractor, mixed farming, lotus farming, chili, maize, fruits, etc.

== Education ==
The following elementary schools are located in Wat Phrik.

- Tha Rong Tawan Ork school - Moo2
- Wat In See school - Moo4
- Wat Sao Hin school - Moo7
- Tha Rong Tawan Tok - Moo10

There is Wat Prik child development center - Moo3

== Healthcare ==
There are Wat Phrik and Ban Sao Hin health-promoting hospitals in Moo6 and Moo7.

== Transport ==
National road 1063 (Phitsanulok-Bang Krathum)

== Electricity ==
The rate of households in Wat Phrik subdistrict that have access to the electricity grid of Provincial Electricity Authority (PEA) is 90 percent.

== Waterworks ==
Provincial Waterworks Authority (PWA) supplied tap water to 3,185 households or 92 percent.
All households have access to the village water supply system in every village.

== Communications ==
All households in Wat Phrik subdistrict have access to the fixed and mobile telephone network.
Nearby post office is in Ban Mai subdistrict municipality.
