= Wat Chan, Phitsanulok =

Coordinates: 16.8033°N 100.2351°E

Wat Chan วัดจันทร์
- Tambon
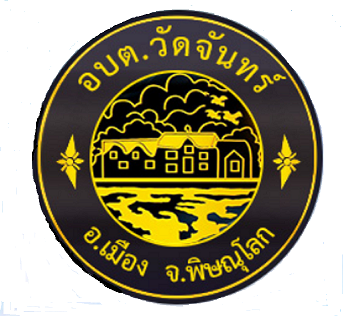
- Seal
- Interactive map of Wat Chan
- Country: Thailand
- Province: Phitsanulok
- District: Mueang Phitsanulok

Government
  - Type: Subdistrict Administrative Organization (SAO)

Area
  - Total: 11.26 km^{2} (4.35 sq mi)

Population (2025)
  - Total: 9,642
  - Density: 856/km^{2} (2,220/sq mi)
- Time zone: UTC+7 (ICT)
- Postal code: 65000
- Calling code: 055
- ISO 3166 code: TH-65010300
- LAO code: 06650110
- Website: www.wadchan.go.th

Wat Chan (Thai: วัดจันทร์) is a subdistrict in the Mueang Phitsanulok District of Phitsanulok Province, Thailand. In 2025, it had a population of 9,642 and 5,261 households. In this subdistrict was the first cooperative in Thailand registered.

== Geography ==
The topography of Wat Chan is fertile lowlands with an area of 11.26 km^{2} of which a section immediately northwest of the Nan river and a section southeast of this river, but separated by an area annexed by the city of Phitsanulok, with a forest and a pond (Thung Nong Phad) rich in marine life (Moo4). The subdistrict is bordered to the north by Phlai Chumphon and Ban Khlong subdistricts, to the east by the city of Phitsanulok, to the south by Bueng Phra subdistrict and to the west by Tha Thong subdistrict. Wat Chan subdistrict lies in the Nan Basin, which is part of the Chao Phraya Watershed.

== History ==
ฺWat Chan Subdistrict Administrative Organization - SAO (ongkan borihan suan tambon) was established, published 30 January 1996 in Royal Thai Government Gazette, volume 113, section 9 Ngor. On 9 March 1999 Wat Chan subdistrict lost the villages Moo1, Moo3, Moo5 and Moo6 to the growing city of Phitsanulok. The new borders are located 200 meter south of the Barom Trilokanat road (landmarks 15-16) and west of the Chaiyanuphap road (landmarks 18-19).

== Administration ==
=== Provincial government ===
The administration of Wat Chan SAO is responsible for an area that covers 7,038 rai ~ 11.26 square kilometres (4.35 sq mi) and consists of six administrative villages, as of 2025: 9,642 people and 5,261 households.

Wat Chan subdistrict with villages

| Village | English | Thai | People | Households |
|---|---|---|---|---|
| Moo2 | Ban Wat Chan | บ้านวัดจันทร์ | 1,572 | 706 |
| Moo4 | Ban Wat Chan | บ้านวัดจันทร์ | 2,129 | 1,313 |
| Moo7 | Ban Don | บ้านดอน | 3,109 | 1,829 |
| Moo8 | Ban Na Pho Daeng | บ้านนาโพธิ์แดง | 658 | 266 |
| Moo9 | Ban Wat Chan | บ้านวัดจันทร์ | 242 | 89 |
| Moo10 | Ban Wat Chan Tawan Tok | บ้านวัดจันทร์ตะวันตก | 1,932 | 1,058 |

=== Local government ===
Wat Chan Subdistrict Administrative Organization - Wat Chan SAO (Thai: องค์การบริหารส่วนตำบลวัดจันทร์, romanized: ongkan borihan suan tambon Wat Chan) covers the whole Wat Chan subdistrict.

Administrative villages contain many villages such as:

- Moo2 - Charoen Suk
- Moo4 - Kitsasiri
- Moo8 - Panasiri
- Moo10- Wana Lake Home, Wana Town Home

== Logo ==
The Wat Chan SAO (อบต - oh boh toh) logo shows the office of the first cooperative in Thailand.

== Temples ==
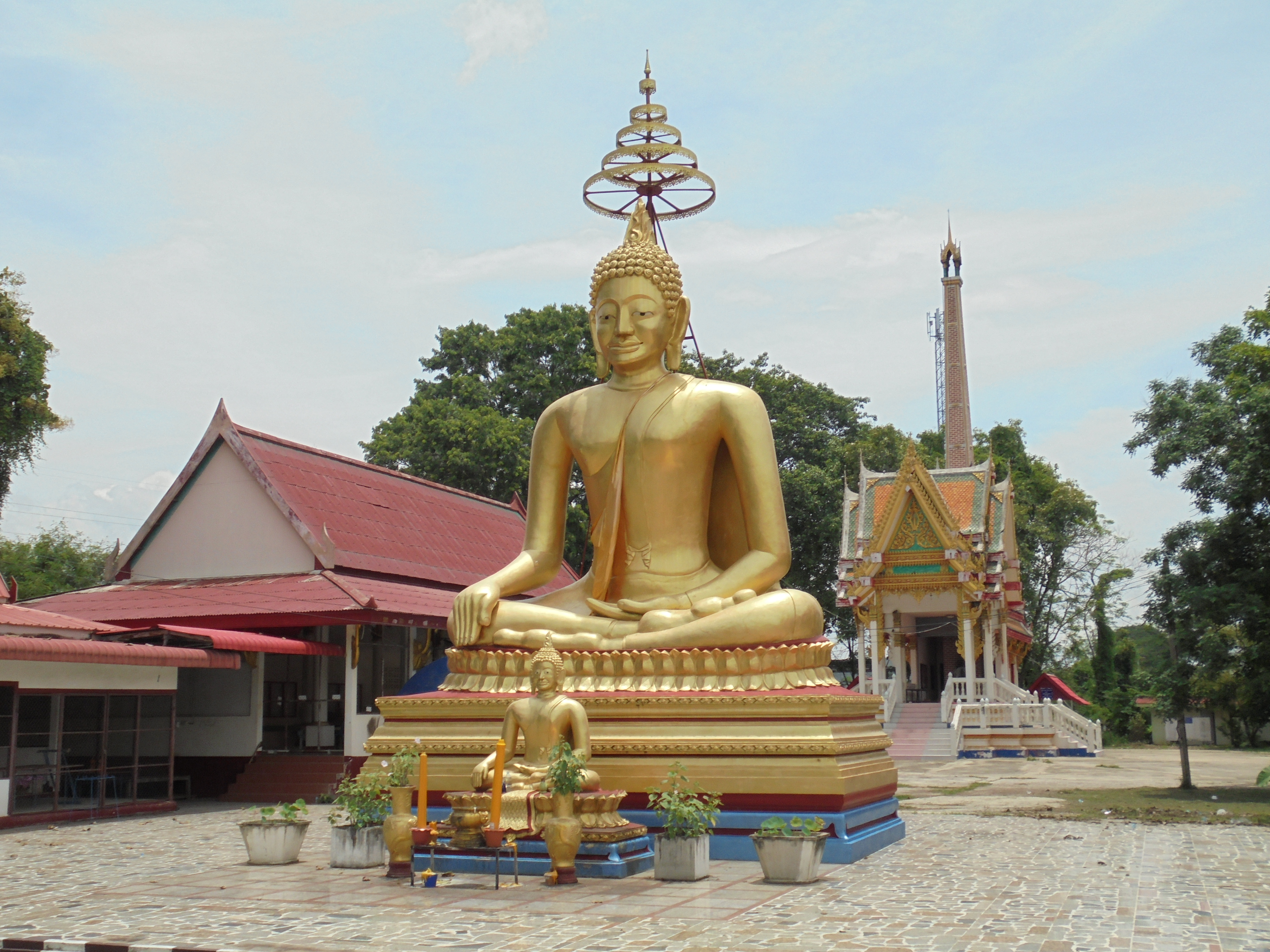
Luang Pho To image of Wat Ratchamonthop

Wat Chan subdistrict is home to the following active temple, where Theravada Buddhism is practiced by local residents: Wat Ratchamonthop (Thai: วัดราชมณทป) colloquially referred to as Wat Luang Pho To (Thai: วัดหลงพ่อโต) or Wat Takrai (Thai: วัดตะไกร) is a Buddhist temple in Ban Don (Moo7). During the Second World War, the temple was bombed by the Axis powers due to its proximity to a military camp and became a ruin. Even the main Buddha Image of the temple was destroyed. The temple has been abandoned and later restored, while it became a royal temple with the name Wat Ratchamonthop.
Originally there were three more Buddhist temples in this subdistrict:

- Wat Pan Phi (Thai: วัดพันปี)
- Wat Chan Tawan Ork (Thai: วัดจันทร์ตะวันออก)
- Wat Chan Tawan Tok (Thai: วัดจันทร์ตะวันตก)

But due to the annexation of villages by the city of Phitsanulok in 1999, these three temples are no longer in Wat Chan subdistrict.

== Infrastructure ==
=== Education ===
- Community learning center
- Kindergarten

=== Healthcare ===
There is Wat Chan health-promoting hospital in Ban Bo (Moo7).
Further, every administrative village has its own community primary health center (6 locations).

=== Transportation ===
Major road is:

- Highway 117, Phitsanulok-Nakhon Sawan route.

=== Electricity ===
Almost every household in Wat Chan subdistrict have access to the electricity network of Provincial Electricity Authority (PEA).

=== Communications ===
All households have access to the fixed and mobile telephone network.

=== Waterworks ===
All households of Wat Chan have access to the water network of Provincial Waterworks Authority (PWA).

== Economy ==
Of the population 30% are engaged in agriculture, of which rice is the main product.
Farmers count for 1%, Animal husbandary 1%, temporary employees 53% and trading 45%.
Retail, hotels, restaurants and factories are mainly located along highway 117. The following companies play a role in the employment service:

- Global House
- Major Furniture Mall (MFM)
- Schlumberger - Phitsanulok - Base.

=== First cooperative in Thailand ===
Krom Muen Pitaya Longkorn (1876-1945) was the "Father of Thai Cooperatives". On 26 February 1916 he was the first cooperative registrar with "Wat Chan Cooperative Unlimited". The start was with 16 members and a working capital of 3,080 baht. As of 2018 the cooperative had 6,691 members in 59 groups.

First cooperative in Thailand

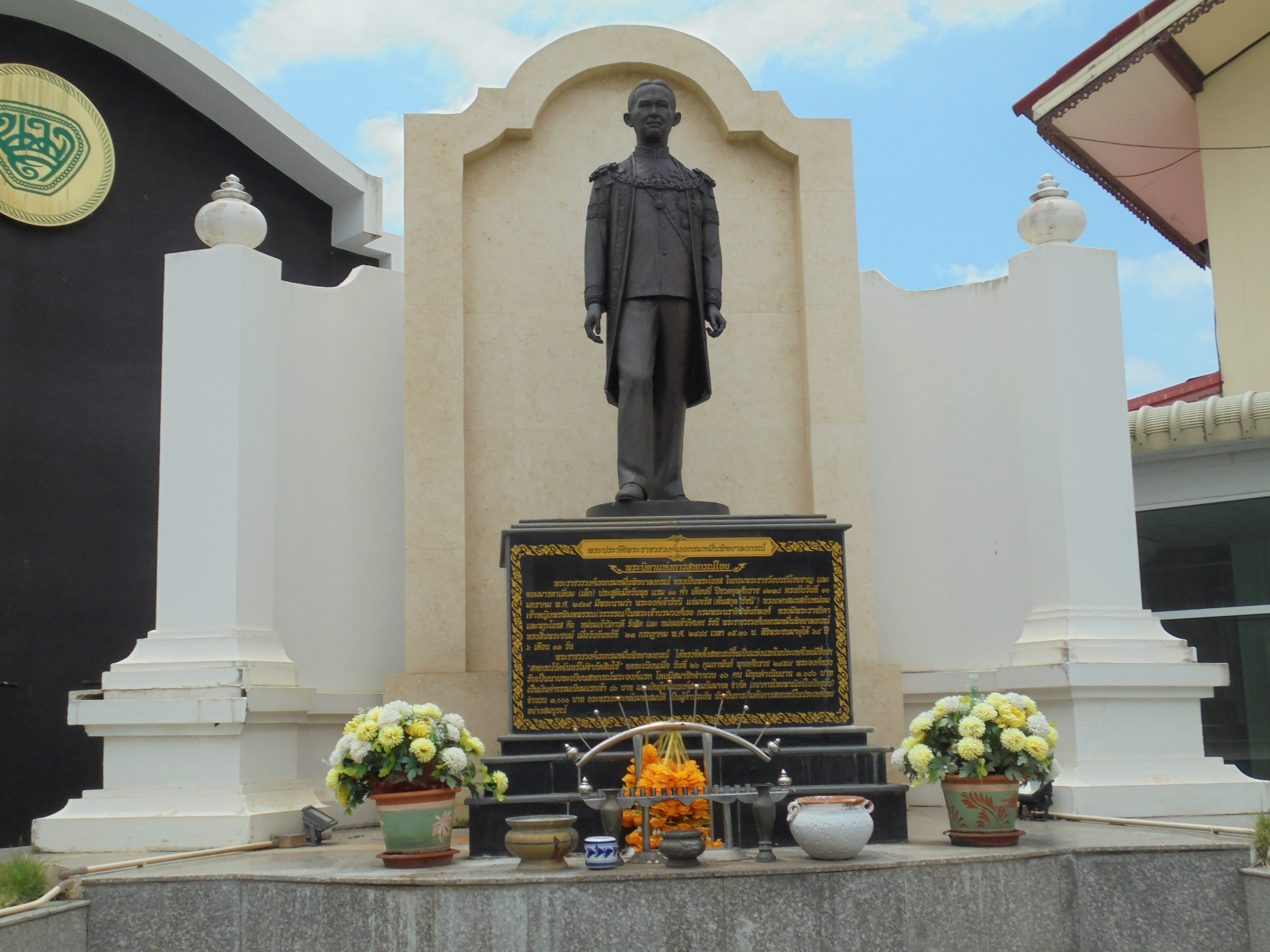
Statue of Krom Muen Pitaya Longkorn.

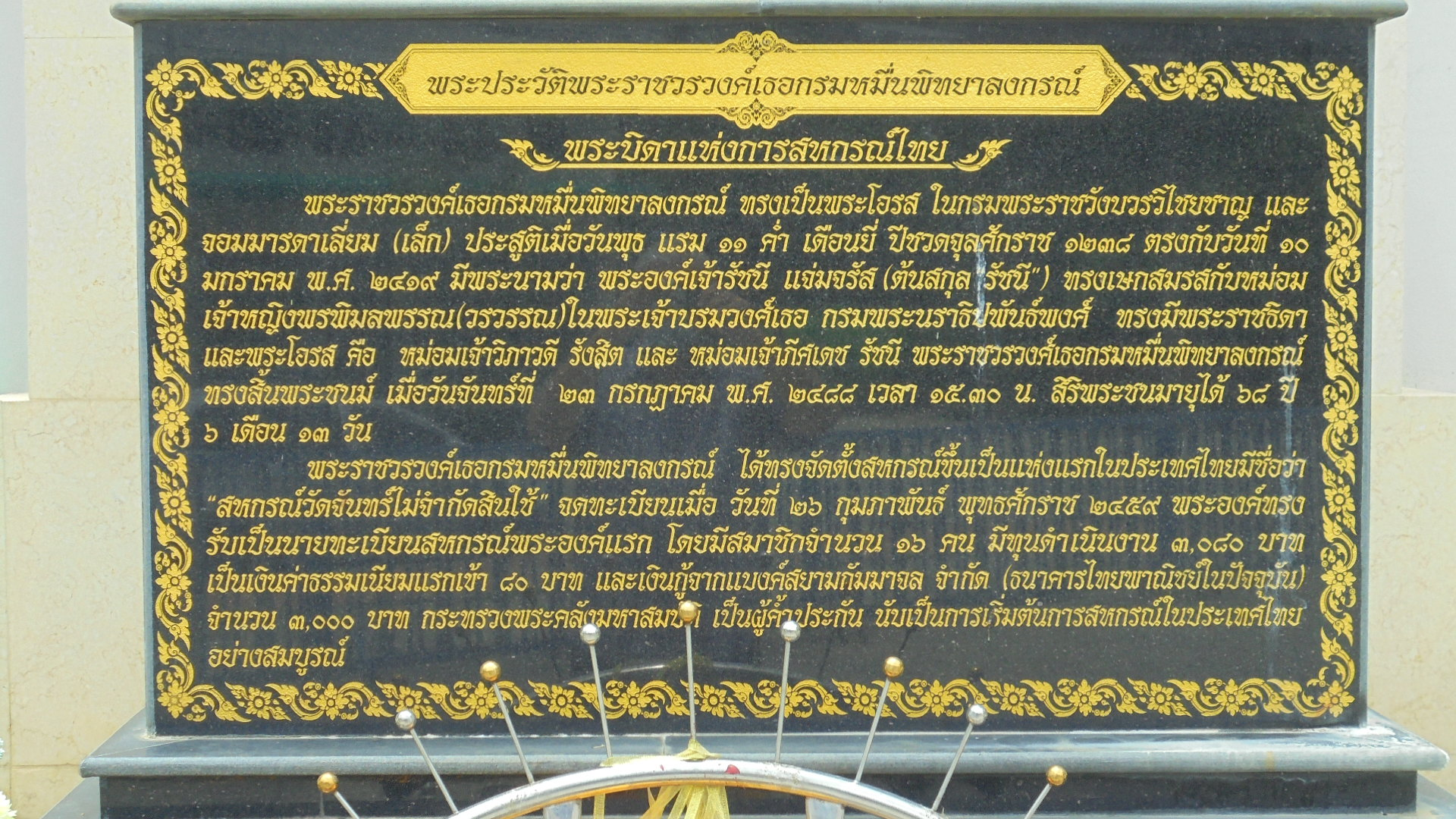
Memorial plate of Krom Muen Pitaya Longkorn.

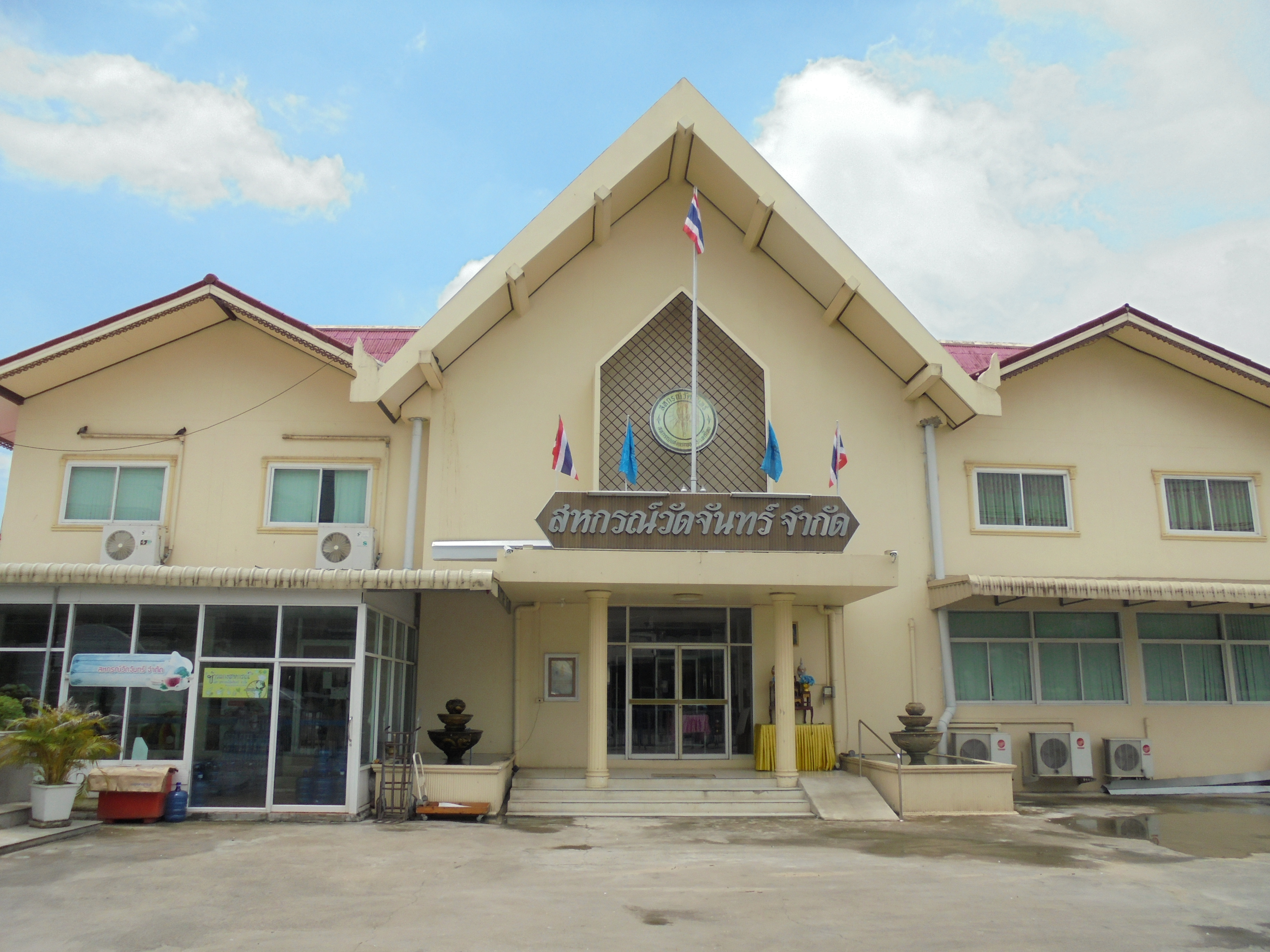
Office of Wat Chan Cooperative.

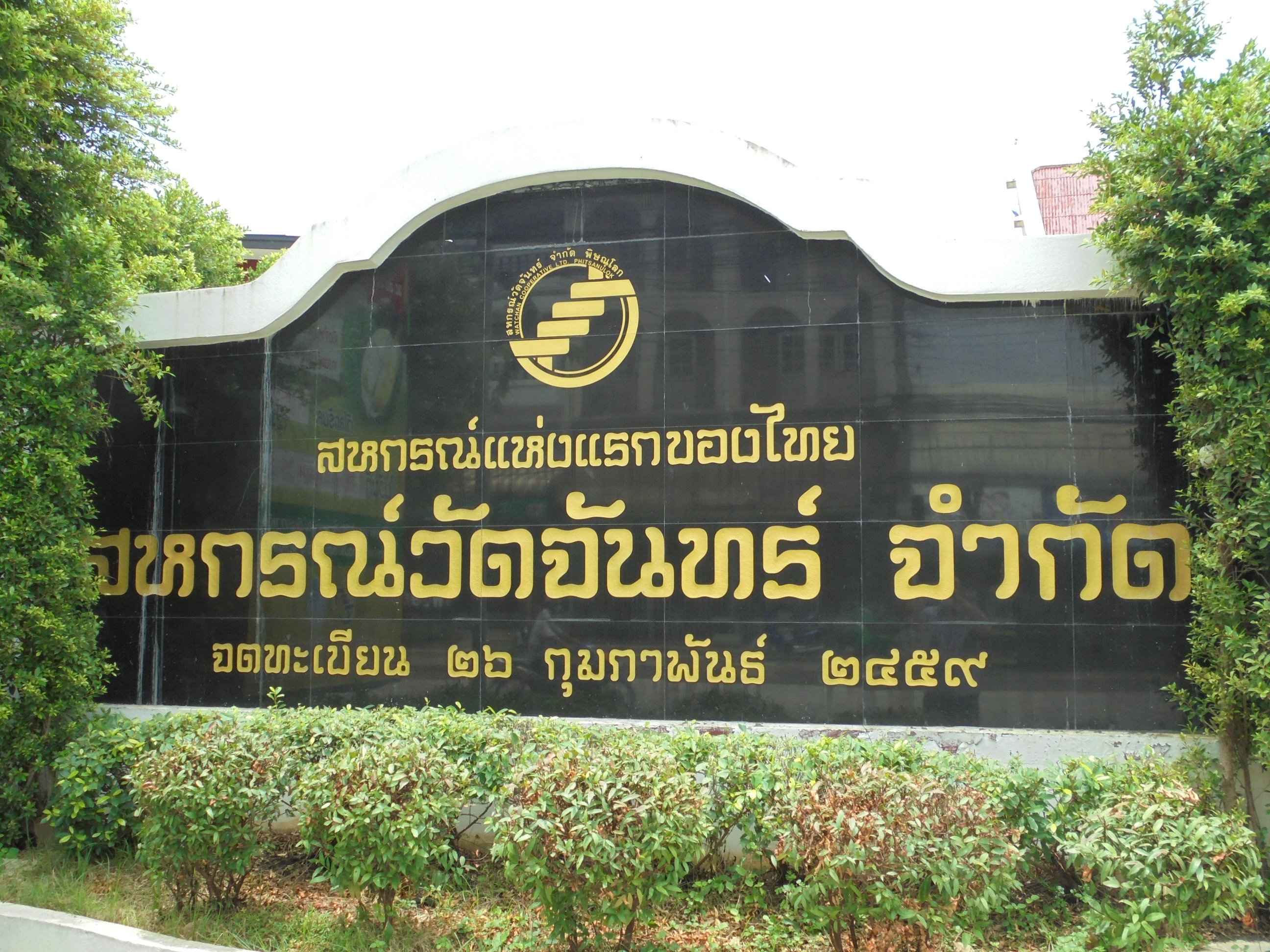
Name plate "Wat Chan Cooperative Ltd."
