= Ban Khlong =

Coordinates: 16.8353°N 100.2320°E

Ban Khlong บ้านคลอง
- Tambon
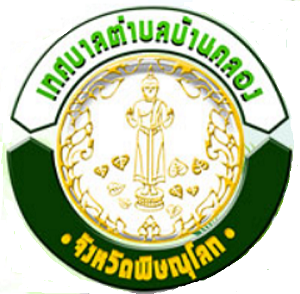
- Seal
- Interactive map of Ban Khlong
- Country: Thailand
- Province: Phitsanulok
- District: Mueang Phitsanulok

Government
  - Type: Subdistrict municipality

Area
  - Total: 8.1 km^{2} (3.1 sq mi)

Population (2025)
  - Total: 13,303
  - Density: 1,642/km^{2} (4,250/sq mi)
- Time zone: UTC+7 (ICT)
- Postal code: 65000
- Calling code: 055
- ISO 3166 code: TH-65011400
- LAO code: 05650108
- Website: www.bankhlong.go.th

Ban Khlong (Thai: บ้านคลอง) is a subdistrict in the Mueang Phitsanulok District of Phitsanulok Province, Thailand. In 2022, it had a population of 13,186 and 6,502 households. In this subdistrict, is King Naresuan Maharat camp (4th Infantry Division).

== Geography ==
The topography of Ban Khlong is fertile lowlands with an area of 8.1 km^{2}. The subdistrict is bordered to the north-west by Phlai Chumphon subdistrict, to the east by Hua Ro subdistrict and the city of Phitsanulok, to the south by Wat Chan subdistrict. Ban Khlong subdistrict lies in the Nan Basin, which is part of the Chao Phraya Watershed. The Nan river flows east of Moo1, Moo2 and Moo3 of the subdistrict and is a natural water source for agricultural consumption. An irrigation canal (Huai Nong Khlong Bueng) flows from Phlai Chumphon subdistrict, through Moo5 of Ban Khlong subdistrict to Wat Chan subdistrict and is an important water source for agricultural consumption and also a raw water source to produce village water supply. The area to the west of this irrigation canal is for agriculture and the area to the east of this irrigation canal is for urbanization.

== History ==
The history of Ban Khlong has a legend that says Wang Chan is the residence of King Naresuan. Because the Ayutthaya period was very tumultuous, the military service placed a fence around it and called it King Naresuan the Great camp. Many skeletons have been discovered during excavations for the hospital building. This place seems to have been a burial ground for soldiers. In 1996 Ban Khlong Subdistrict Administrative Organization - SAO (ongkan borihan suan tambon) was established. On 9 March 1999 Ban Khlong subdistrict lost the communities Ban Khlong Phatthana and Ban Khlong Samakkhee (Moo4) and community Sa Song Hong (Moo1) to the growing city of Phitsanulok. The new borders are located 200 meters west of the regional highway 117 (landmarks 20-21) and with the military camp (landmarks 1-2). Upgrade to subdistrict municipality (thesaban tambon) was on 15 August 2012, effectively 24 August 2012.

== Administration ==
=== Provincial government ===
The administration of Ban Khlong subdistrict is responsible for an area that covers 5,113 rai ~ 8.1 square kilometres (3.1 sq mi) and consists of five administrative villages, as of 2025: 13,303 people and 7,012 households.

Ban Khlong subdistrict with villages

Village	English	Thai	People	Households
Moo1	Ban Wat Yang	บ้านวัดยาง	4,284	1,965
Moo2	Ban Bang Sakae	บ้านบางสะแก	2,327	1,221
Moo3	Ban Bang Sakae	บ้านบางสะแก	1,492	665
Moo4	Ban Khlong	บ้านคลอง	2,614	1,527
Moo5	Ban Khlong	บ้านคลอง	2,586	1,634

Administrative villages contain many villages such as:

- Moo2 - Ban Rim Nan
- Moo3 - Ban Pak Phu Phiphaksa

=== Local government ===
Ban Khlong Subdistrict Municipality (Thai: เทศบาลตำบลบ้านคลอง, romanized: thetsaban tambon Ban Khlong) covers the whole Ban Khlong subdistrict.

== Logo ==
The Ban Khlong subdistrict-municipality (thesaban tambon Ban Khlong) logo shows a standing Buddha, prevent family members from fighting.

== Temples ==
Ban Khlong subdistrict is home to the following active temples, where Theravada Buddhism is practiced by local residents:

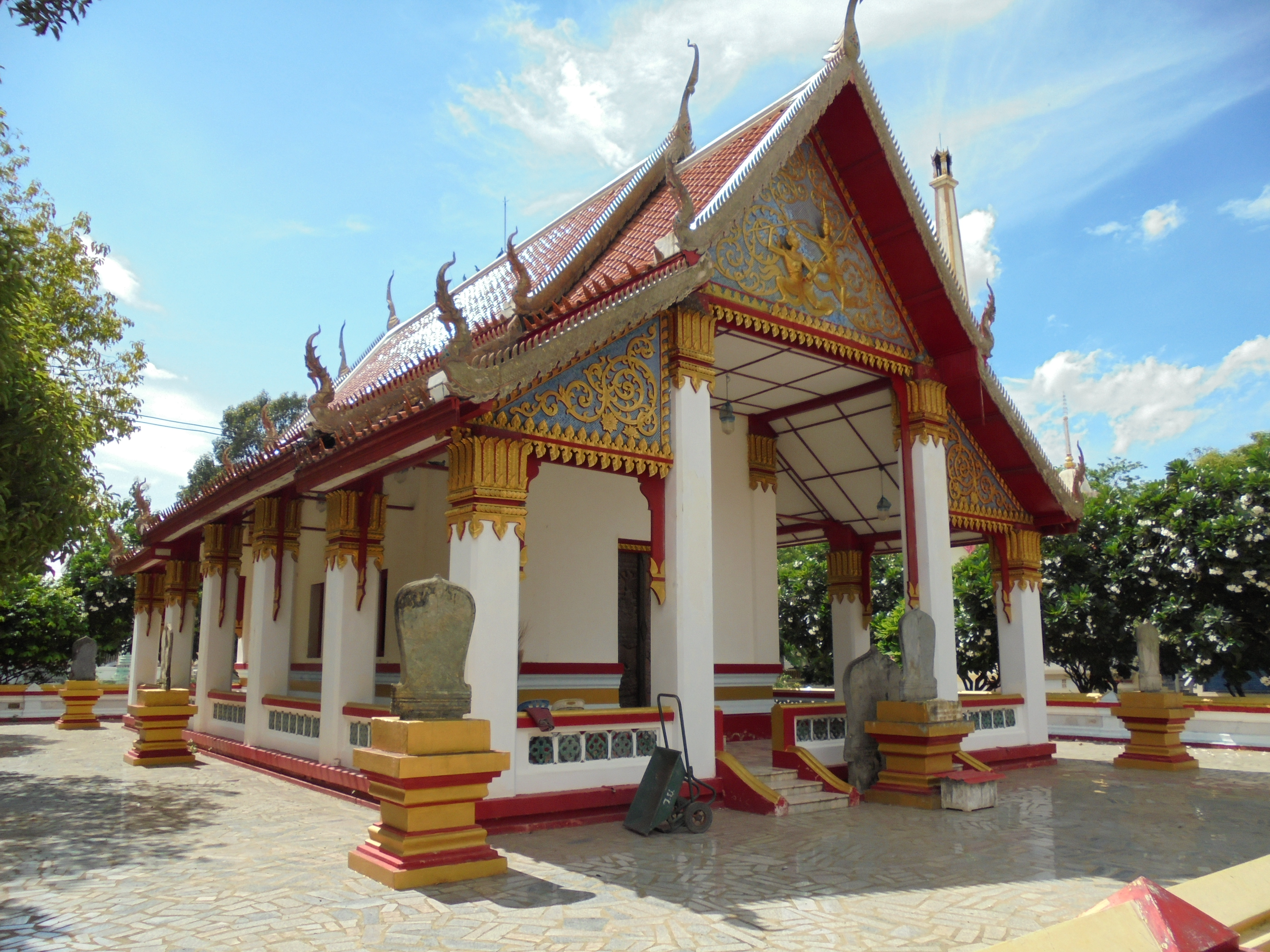
Wat Yang

Temple name	Thai	Location
Wat Yang	วัดยาง	Moo1
Wat Kai Khia	วัดไก่เขี่ย	Moo2
Wat Sud Sawat	วัดสุดสวาสดิ์	Moo3
Wat Ban Khlong	วัดบ้านคลอง	Moo5

== Infrastructure ==
=== Education ===
Vocational education:

- Phitsanulok Polytechnic College (Moo1)

Primary education:

- Wat Yang School
- Ban Khlong Municipal Kindergarten.

=== Healthcare ===
There are Ban Khlong health-promoting hospital in Ban Bang Sakae (Moo2) and Fort Somdet Phra Naresuan Maharat hospital in Ban Wat Yang (Moo1).

=== Transportation ===
Major roads are:

- Highway 12, Phitsanulok-Sukhothai route.
- Highway 117, Phitsanulok-Nakhon Sawan route.

=== Electricity ===
All households in subdistrict Ban Khlong have access to the electricity network.

=== Communications ===
All households have access to the fixed and mobile telephone network.

=== Waterworks ===
All households in Ban Khlong subdistrict have access to the water network of Provincial Waterworks Authority (PWA).

== Economy ==
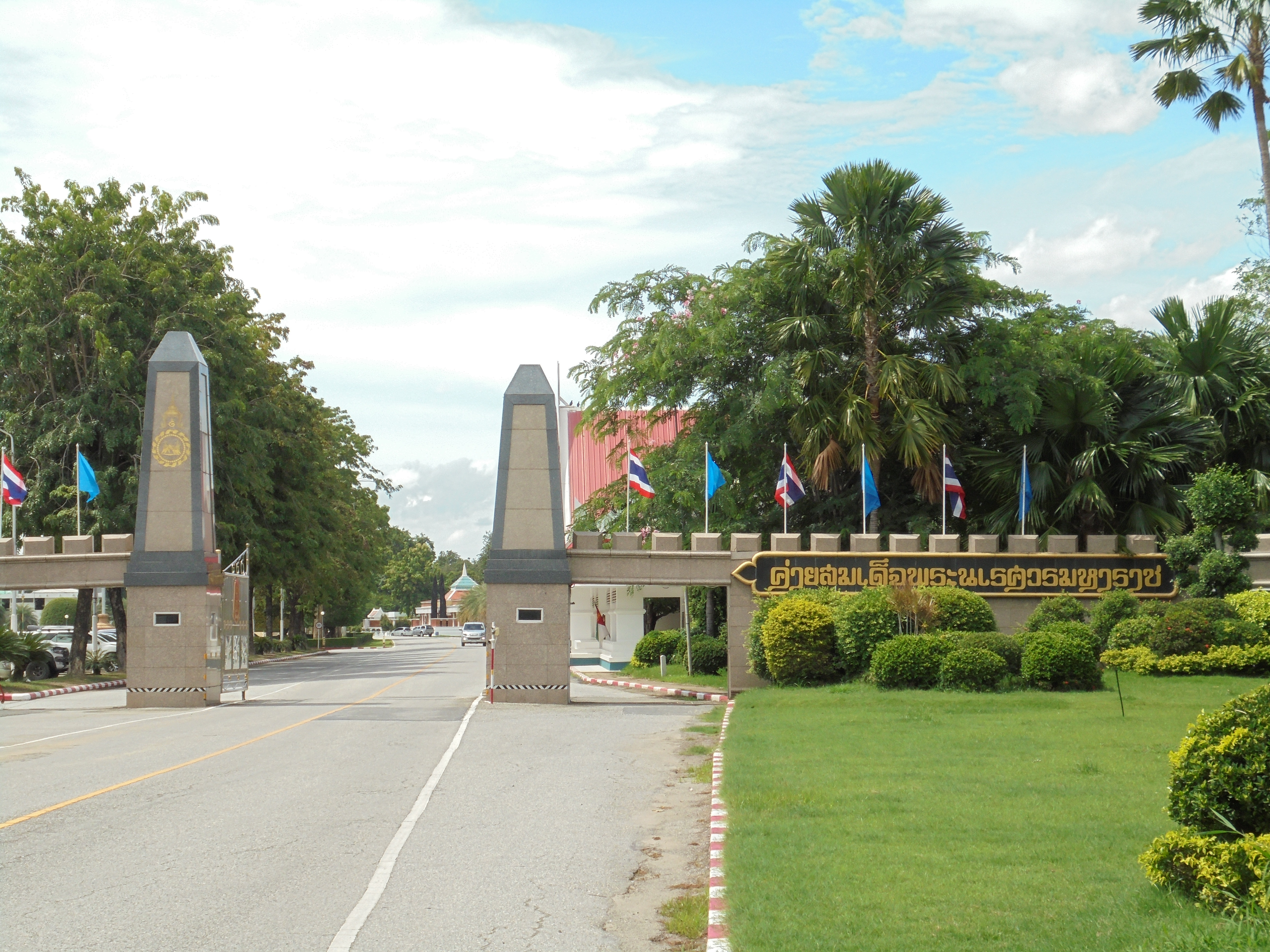
King Naresuan Maharat Camp

People west of the irrigation canal work in the agricultural sector.
Companies in Ban Khlong subdistrict are:

- Phitsanulok Provincial Transport Office, Department of Land Transport
- True Regional Office Phitsanulok.

The presence of King Naresuan Maharat Camp (Thai:ค่ายสมเด็จพระนเรศวรมหาราช khai somdec phra naresuan maharacha) 4th Infantry Division of Royal Thai Army in Ban Wat Yang (Moo1) is also important for employment.
