= Ngio Ngam, Phitsanulok =

Coordinates: 16.6633°N 100.2377°E

Ngio Ngam งิ้วงาม
- Tambon
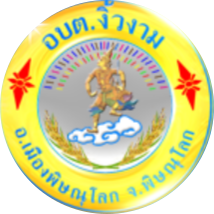
- Seal
- Interactive map of Ngio Ngam
- Country: Thailand
- Province: Phitsanulok
- District: Mueang Phitsanulok

Government
  - Type: Subdistrict Administrative; Organization (SAO)

Area
  - Total: 23.7 km^{2} (9.2 sq mi)

Population (2025)
  - Total: 3,531
  - Density: 148/km^{2} (380/sq mi)
- Time zone: UTC+7 (ICT)
- Postal code: 65000
- Calling code: 055
- ISO 3166 code: TH-65012000
- LAO code: 06650111
- Website: www.ngiwngam.go.th

Ngio Ngam (Thai: งิ้วงาม) is a subdistrict in the Mueang Phitsanulok District of Phitsanulok Province, Thailand. In 2025 it had a population of 3,531 and 1,280 households. The economy of this subdistrict is mainly based on agriculture.

== Geography ==
The topography of Ngio Ngam subdistrict is flat plains and is located in the lower northern part of Thailand. The subdistrict is bordered to the north by Wat Phrik subdistrict, to the east by Wang Nam Khu subdistrict, to the south by Phichit province and to the west by Bang Rakam district. Ngio Ngam subdistrict lies in the Nan Basin, which is part of the Chao Phraya Watershed. The Nan River flows on the boundary of Ngio Ngam and Wang Nam Khu subdistricts. An irrigation canal (Huai Nong Khlong Bueng) flows from Wat Phrik subdistrict to Ngio Ngam subdistrict and is an important water source for agricultural consumption and also a raw water source to produce village water supply.

== Administration ==
=== Provincial government ===
The administration of ฺNgio Ngam subdistrict (tambon) is responsible for an area that covers 14,860 rai ~ 23.7 square kilometres (9.2 sq mi) and consists of seven administrative villages (muban). As of 2025: 3,531 people and 1,806 households.

Ngio Ngam subdistrict with villages

Village	English	Thai	People	Households
Moo1	Ban Pak Phing	บ้านปากพิง	374	113
Moo2	Ban Pak Phing Tawan Tok	บ้านปากพิงตะวันตก	469	205
Moo3	Ban Pak Phing Tawan Tok	บ้านปากพิงตะวันตก	542	174
Moo4	Ban Ngio Ngam	บ้านงิ้วงาม	950	335
Moo5	Ban Bang Sai	บ้านบางทราย	385	175
Moo6	Ban Pak Phing Tawan Tok	บ้านปากพิงตะวันตก	514	172
Moo7	Ban Bueng Khun Non	บ้านบึงขุนนนท์	297	106

=== Local government ===
Ngio Ngam Subdistrict Administrative Organization - Ngio Ngam SAO (Thai: องค์การบริหารตำบลงิ้วงาม, romanized: ongkan borihan suan tambon Ngio Ngam) covers the whole Ngio Ngam subdistrict.

== Temples ==
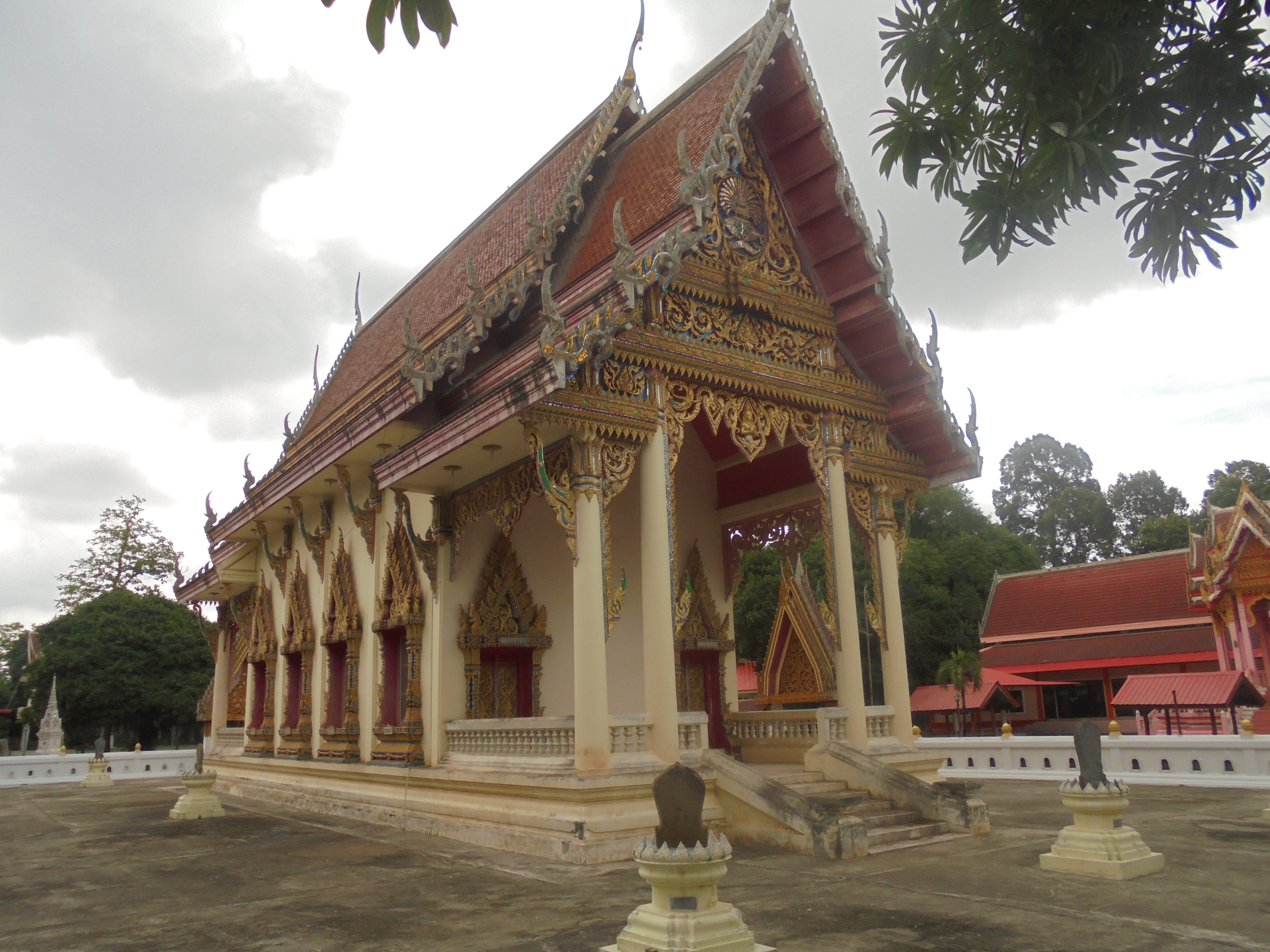
Ubosot of Wat Ngio Ngam

Ngio Ngam subdistrict is home to the following active temples, where Theravada Buddhism is practised by local residents:

Temple name	Thai	Location
Wat Pak Phing Tawan Tok	วัดปากพิงตะวันตก	Moo2
Wat Ngio Ngam	วัดงิ้วงาม	Moo4
Wat Bueng Khun Non	วัดบึงขุนนนท์	Moo7

== Economy ==
Most of the people are engaged in agriculture of which rice is the main crop.

== Education ==
The following school is located in Ngio Ngam subdistrict.

- Wat Pak Phing Tawan Tok school in Moo6

== Healthcare ==
- Ngio Ngam health-promoting hospital in Moo3.

== Transport ==
- National road 1063, Phitsanulok-Bang Krathum

== Electricity ==
All households in Ngio Ngam subdistrict have access to the electricity grid of Provincial Electricity Authority (PEA).

== Waterworks ==
All households in Ngio Ngam subdistrict have access to the water network of Provincial Waterworks Authority (PWA).

== Communications ==
All households in Ngio Ngam subdistrict have access to the mobile telephone network.
