= Mueang Phitsanulok district =

Mueang Phitsanulok เมืองพิษณุโลก
- District
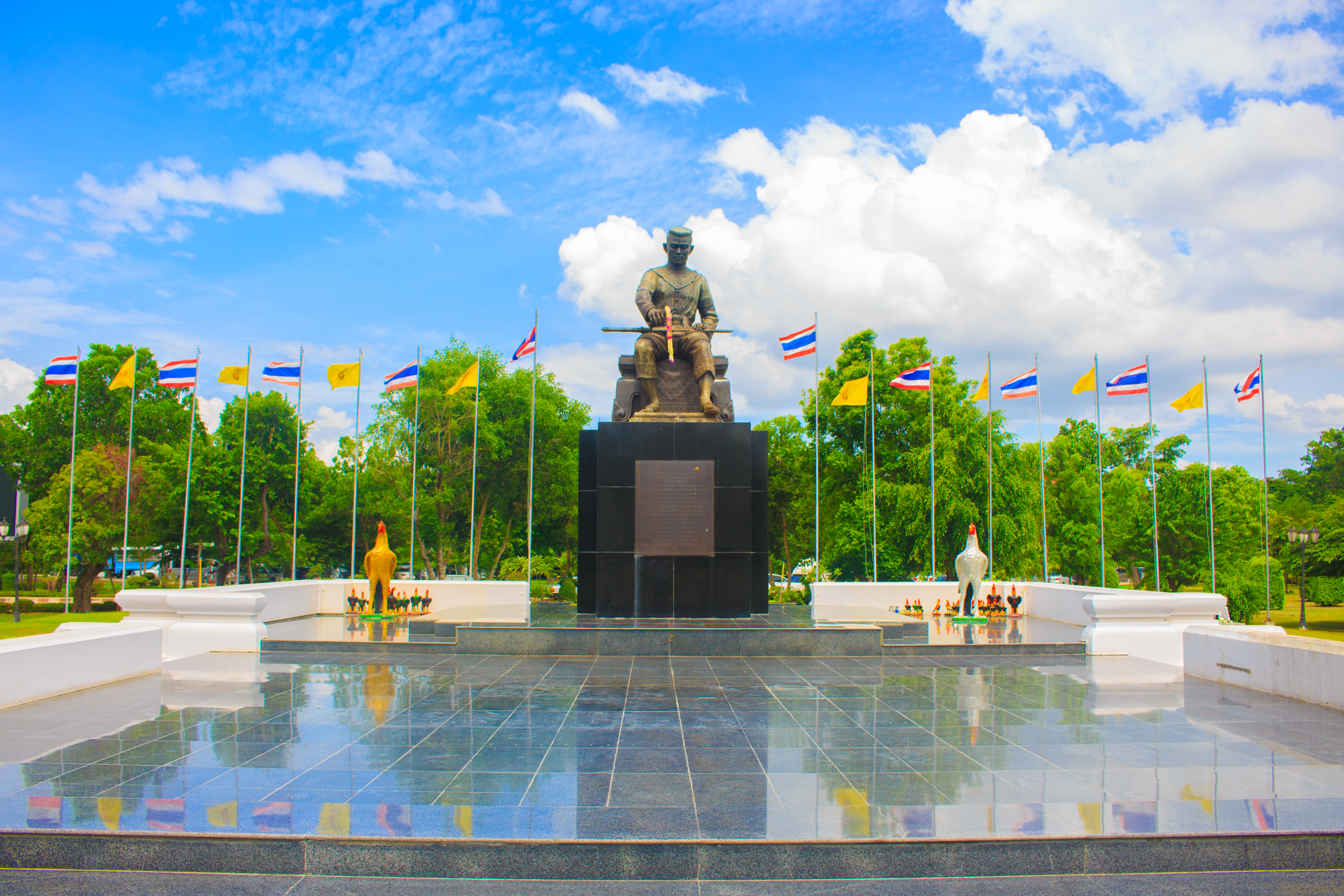
- King Naresuan Statue at Naresuan University

- Seal

- District location in Phitsanulok province
- Coordinates: 16°49′29″N 100°15′34″E
- Country: Thailand
- Province: Phitsanulok
- Seat: Nai Mueang

Area
  - Total: 777 km^{2} (300 sq mi)

Population (2025)
  - Total: 279,774
  - Density: 360/km^{2} (930/sq mi)
- Time zone: UTC+7 (ICT)
- ISO 3166 code: TH-6501
- Postal code: 65000
- LAO code: 02650101
- Website: www.phitsanulok.go.th

Mueang Phitsanulok (Thai: เมืองพิษณุโลก, pronounced [mɯ̄a̯ŋ pʰít.sā.nú.lôːk]) is the capital district (amphoe mueang) of Phitsanulok province, lower northern region of Thailand.

== History ==
Mueang Phitsanulok was the first class city in the northern part of Ayutthaya kingdom until the end of the kingdom in 1767. Also in the reign of King Taksin the Great, Phitsanulok was the first class city. In the Thesaphiban administrative reforms of King Chulalongkorn (Rama V) the city became the center of monthon Phitsanulok. Also during these reforms the district was created in 1898. Luang Udom Khet Borihan became the first district head officer.

== Geography ==
=== Location ===
Neighboring districts are (from the north clockwise) Phrom Phiram, Wat Bot, Wang Thong, Bang Krathum and Bang Rakam of Phitsanulok province.

=== Topography ===
Mueang Phitsanulok lies within the Nan Basin, although the district's western border with Bang Rakam district is essentially the boundary between the Nan Basin and the Yom Basin as well. The distinction between the basins is blurry in this region, as the terrain is flat, and residents have diverted much of the water flow for agriculture over the years. Both basins are part of the Chao Phraya Watershed. The important water resource is the Nan River, and the Khwae Noi River also flows through the district.

=== Nature ===
Forest area is 53 km^{2} (20 sq mi), approximately 6.8 percent of the total area of the district. Not to far away is Thung Salaeng Luang National Park, 1,262 km^{2} (487 sq mi).

== Religion ==
As of 2019 the population of Mueang Phitsanulok district was 95 percent Buddhist with some active 83 Buddhist temples (Wats) and 26 samnak song (houses of monks that are not officially registered).
There are 11 Christian churches in Mueang Phitsanulok District and muslims have their Masjid Abubak Pakistan mosque.

== Administration ==
=== Provincial government ===
The district is divided into 20 subdistricts (tambons), which are further subdivided into 175 villages (mubans).

	Subdistrict	Population	Villages
1	Nai Mueang	60,108	-
2	Aranyik	29,116	10
3	Hua Ro	26,537	12
4	Bueng Phra	19,010	10
5	Samo Khae	16,017	10
6	Tha Pho	15,875	11
7	Tha Thong	14,388	11
8	Don Thong	13,425	14
9	Ban Krang	13,394	12
10	Ban Khlong	13,303	5

	Subdistrict	Population	Villages
11	Wat Chan	9,642	6
12	Wat Phrik	8,678	12
13	Phlai Chumphon	8,142	5
14	Ban Pa	5,779	10
15	Makham Sung	5,702	10
16	Pak Thok	4,992	7
17	Chom Thong	4,047	9
18	Wang Nam Khu	4,046	8
19	Phai Kho Don	4,042	6
20	Ngio Ngam	3,531	7
	Total population	279,774	175

=== Local government ===
Phitsanulok is a city municipality (thesaban nakhon) which covers tambon Nai Mueang. Aranyik and Tha Pho are town municipalities (thesaban mueang). Hua Ro, Samo Khae, Tha Thong, Ban Khlong, Phlai Chumphon and Ban Mai are subdistrict municipalities (thesaban tambon). Ban Mai covered parts of tambons Wang Nam Khu and Wat Phrik. There are further 12 Subdistrict Administrative Organisations - SAO (ongkan borihan suan tambon).

City municipality	Population
Phitsanulok city municipality	60,108

Town municipalities	Population
Aranyik town municipality	29,116
Tha Pho town municipality	15,875

Subdistrict municipalities	Population
Hua Ro subdistrict municipality	26,537
Samo Khae subdistrict mun.	16,017
Tha Thong subdistrict municipality	14,388

Subdistrict municipalities	Population
Ban Khlong subdistrict municipality	13,303
Phlai Chumphon subdistrict mun.	8,142
Ban Mai subdistrict municipality	1,856

Subdistrict Adm. Org. - SAO	Population
Bueng Phra SAO	19,010
Don Thong SAO	13,425
Ban Krang SAO	13,394
Wat Chan SAO	9,642
Wat Phrik SAO	8,678
Ban Pa SAO	5,779

Subdistrict Adm. Org. - SAO	Population
Makham Sung SAO	5,702
Pak Thok SAO	4,992
Chom Thong SAO	4,047
Wang Nam Khu SAO	4,046
Phai Kho Don SAO	4,042
Ngio Ngam SAO	3,531

Municipality	Communities	Groups
Phitsanulok city mun.	64	4
Ban Mai subdistrict mun.	5	-

Mueang Phitsanulok district divided into 21 local entities

== Demography ==
=== Population ===
Mueang Phitsanulok district is with 279,774 people the most densely populated district of Phitsanulok Province. The other eight districts have a total population of 276,936 people.

=== Urban area ===
Urban population in Mueang Phitsanulok district is 158,534 people (54.4 percent). The urban area around the city of Phitsanulok has 156,547 people and around Ban Mai is this 1,987 people; 54.4 percent of the people in the district live in a municipal area, 132,277 people (45.6 percent) live in a non-municipal area.

== Economy ==
Mueang Phitsanulok district is the shopping and service center of Phitsanulok Province.

=== Department stores ===
- Big C Supercenter
- CentralPlaza Phitsanulok
- Lotus and Lotus Extra
- Makro 1 and 2
- Thai Watsadu Phitsanulok

=== Service Facilities ===
- 15 places of service facilities of the government in Hua Ro - Moo 4 and 5.
- 49 banks and financial institutions.
- 102 hotels.
- 210 groups of "One Tambon - One Product" (OTOP).

=== Agriculture ===
==== Four main crops ====
- Rice is the major product of the four main crops, with a production of 196,497 ton (15.3 percent of the provincial 1,284,164 ton).
  Crop area is 24,553 hectares (60,670 acres) or 7.3 percent of the province's crop area. 7,284 households are involved by the production.
- Cassava and maize production takes place on 1,509 hectares (3,730 acres), involving 491 households. Crop area is just 2.0 percent of the province's crop area.
- Cane sugar production takes place on 838 hectares (2,070 acres), 202 households are involved by the production. Crop area is just 3.3 percent of the province's crop area.

==== Fruit trees and tree crops ====
- Mango, Banana, Lime, Longan, Tamarind and Pomelo production takes place on 155 hectares (380 acres) or just 0.3 percent of the province's harvest area, involving 307 households.

==== Vegetable crops ====
- Watermelon, Chinese cabbage, Cabbage, Cucumber and Pumpkin production takes place on 91 hectares (220 acres) or 5.8 percent of the province's crops area, involving 198 households.

==== Livestock farming ====
Livestock farming produced commodities from chicken 597,497; duck 101,252; swine 16,732; cattle 3,540; buffalo 1,736; goat 2,446 and goose 141.

==== Fishery ====
Total catch from freshwater aquaculture was 1,144 ton, or 9.4 percent of 12,169 ton from Phitsanulok Province.

== Education ==
Mueang Phitsanulok district is the educational center of Phitsanulok Province. There are many educational institutions at all levels, from kindergarten to university level, both government and private.

=== Higher education ===
There are six higher education institutes in or around the district with 38,553 students:

- Naresuan University with 16 faculties, 184 courses and with more than 22,000 students is leader of the universities in Phitsanulok province.
- Pibulsongkram Rajabhat University with 6 faculties.
- Rajamangala University of Technology Lanna, campus Phitsanulok with 3 faculties.
- Phitsanulok University, a private university with 5 faculties is the last with 174 students.
- Sirindhorn College of Public Health Phitsanulok Province.
- Boromarajonani College of Nursing Buddhachinaraj.

=== Vocational education ===
- Total seven vocational colleges with 11,023 students.

=== Secondary education ===
- Total 12 upper secondary schools with 9,230 students.
- Total 23 lower secondary schools with 12,590 students.

=== Primary education ===
- Total 87 primary schools with 20,877 pupils.

== Healthcare ==
=== Government hospitals ===
There are four government hospitals in Mueang Phitsanulok District.

- Buddhachinaraj Phitsanulok Hospital is the provincial's and city's primary public hospital with 1,000 beds.
- Naresuan University Hospital is the regional tertiary care hospital.
- Fort Somdet Phra Naresuan Maharat Hospital is the army hospital, which is open to the general public.
- Royal Thai Air Force Wing 46 Hospital is the air force hospital, which is also open to the general public.

=== Private hospitals ===
Five private hospitals are in Mueang Phitsanulok District with total 400 beds:

- Bangkok Hospital Phitsanulok
- Phitsanulok Hospital
- Pitsanuvej Hospital
- Ruamphaet Hospital
- Radiotherapy and Nuclear Medicine Hospital

=== Health promoting hospitals ===
There are 24 health promoting hospitals in Mueang Phitsanulok District.

== Infrastructure ==
=== Roads ===
Road 126, a multi-lane by-pass enables through-traffic to avoid the city of Phitsanulok, and connects to highway 11 to Uttaradit and Lampang in the north, and to highway 12 to Phetchabun in the east, and to highway 11 to Sing Buri in the south, and to highway 117 to Nakhon Sawan in the south, and to highway 12 to Sukhothai, Tak and Mae Sot in the west.

=== Buses ===
Phitsanulok Terminal 1 (Saen Phon Phai) and Terminal 2 (Samo Khae) provide the mass transport throughout Phitsanulok Province by some eight bus companies. Yanyon tour operates its own private bus station (Sua Thim) with only a busline to Bangkok.

=== Airport ===
Close to the city center (Aranyik), Phitsanulok Airport receives up to six flights a day from Bangkok (flight time approximately 60 minutes), which are operated by three airlines: Nok Air, Thai Air Asia and Thai Lion Air.

=== Railway ===
In the city center, Phitsanulok railway station mainly receives intercity trains on the Northern Line, operated by State Railway of Thailand, more than a dozen trains running in each direction each day.

=== Radio ===
There are eight radio stations in the district:

- Sathaanii Witthayu Krajaisiang Thahaan Aakaat (Air Force Radio Station), 954 AM and 95.75, in the City of Phitsanulok
- Sathaanii Witthayu Krajaisiang Haeng Pratheet Thai (Radio Thailand, Government Public Relations Department, PRD), 1026 AM and 94.25 FM, in Ban Khlong
- Kong Thap Phaak Thii Saam (Third Army Area), 1116 AM and 1188 AM, in Aranyik
- Witthayu Kong Phon Thahaan Raap Thii Sii (4th Infantry Division), 1377 AM, at Fort Somdet Phra Naresuan Maharat
- Sathaanii Witthayu Phitaksantiraat (Communications Division, Royal Thai Police), 1422 AM, in Phitsanulok City
- Sathaanii Withayu Krom Utiniyom Witthayaa (Meteorological Department), 104.25 FM, in Tha Thong
- Ongkaan Suesaan Muanchon Haeng Pratheet Thai (Mass Communications Organization of Thailand, MCOT), 106.25 FM, in Bueng Phra
- Mahaawitthayalai Naresuan (Naresuan University), 107.25 FM, in Tha Pho

== Flooding ==
In 2006, there were reported cases of leptospirosis among residents of Mueang Phitsanulok, contracted from standing water.
