= Bueng Phra =

Coordinates: 16.746°N 100.275°E

Bueng Phra บึงพระ
- Tambon
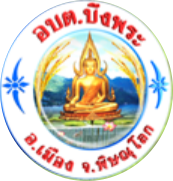
- Seal
- Interactive map of Bueng Phra
- Country: Thailand
- Province: Phitsanulok
- District: Mueang Phitsanulok

Government
  - Type: Subdistrict Administrative; Organization (SAO)

Area
  - Total: 34.2 km^{2} (13.2 sq mi)

Population (2025)
  - Total: 19,010
  - Density: 555/km^{2} (1,440/sq mi)
- Time zone: UTC+7 (ICT)
- Postal code: 65000
- Calling code: 055
- ISO 3166 code: TH-65011800
- LAO code: 06650116
- Website: www.buengphra.go.th

Bueng Phra (Thai: บึงพระ) is a subdistrict in the Mueang Phitsanulok District of Phitsanulok Province, Thailand. The area is urban and lowland area. In 2025, it had a population of 19,010 and 9,587 households.

== Geography ==
The topography of Bueng Phra subdistrict is fertile lowlands and is located in the lower northern part of Thailand. The subdistrict is bordered to the north by the city of Phitsanulok and Aranyik subdistrict, to the east by Wang Thong district, to the south by Wat Phrik subdistrict and to the west by Wat Chan subdistrict. Bueng Phra subdistrict lies in the Nan Basin, which is part of the Chao Phraya Watershed. The Nan river flows west of the subdistrict.

== History ==
The legend said that the boat carrying the Buddha image was wrecked. Therefore, the villagers call that spot "Bueng Phra".
Bueng Phra Subdistrict Administrative Organization was established, published 30 January 1996 in Royal Thai Government Gazette, General Issue, Volume 113, Section 9 Ngor.

== Administration ==
=== Provincial government ===
The administration of Bueng Phra subdistrict (tambon) is responsible for an area that covers 21,362 rai ~ 34.2 square kilometres (13.2 sq mi) and consists of ten administrative villages (muban), as of 2025: 19,010 people and 9,587 households.

Bueng Phra subdistrict with villages

Village	English	Thai	People	Households
Moo1	Ban Na Pho Daeng	บ้านนาโพธิ์แดง	2,111	1,379
Moo2	Ban Nong Tom Noi	บ้านหนองตมน้อย	2,125	883
Moo3	Ban Bueng Phra	บ้านบึงพระ	1,512	796
Moo4	Ban Pak Lat Mai	บ้านปากลาดใหม่	1,254	508
Moo5	Ban Khlong Chan	บ้านคลองจันทร์	677	309
Moo6	Ban Nong Phai Lom	บ้านหนองไผ่ล้อม	1,075	720
Moo7	Ban Dong Phikun	บ้านดงพิกุล	2,225	1,367
Moo8	Ban Saphan Sie	บ้านสะพานที่สิ่	2,244	1,122
Moo9	Ban Na Pho Daeng	บ้านนาโพธิ์แดง	3,466	1,492
Moo10	Ban Na Thong Phatthana	บ้านนาทองพัฒนา	1,808	1,010

=== Local government ===
Bueng Phra Subdistrict Administrative Organization - Bueng Phra SAO (Thai: องค์การบริหารตำบลบึงพระ, romanized: ongkan borihan suan tambon Bueng Phra) covers the whole Bueng Phra subdistrict.

== Temples ==
Bueng Phra subdistrict is home to the following active temples, where Theravada Buddhism is practised by local residents:

Temple name	Thai	Location
Wat Bueng Phra	วัดบึงพระ	Moo2
Wat Santiwan	วัดสันติวัน	Moo3
Wat Sutha Wanaram	ลัดสุธาวนาราม	Moo4
Wat Rat Sattharam	วัดราษฏร์ศรัทธาราม	Moo5
Wat Nong Phai Lom	วัดหนองไผ่ว้อม	Moo6
Wat Phikun Thong	ลัดพิกุลทอง	Moo7
Wat Phikun Wararam	วัดพิกุลวราราม	Moo8

== Economy ==
Because the area is plain lowland with sandy soil and sandy loamy soil, it is suitable for farming and horticulture (kale, bok choy, lettuce, etc.).
Retail and trading are mainly located along Phitsanulok-Bueng Phra road (1064).

== Education ==
- Bungphra Phitsanulok Commercial College - Moo1
- Wat Bueng Phra School - Moo2
- Wat Mai Rat Sattharam School - Moo5

== Healthcare ==
There is Bueng Phra health-promoting hospital in Ban Bueng Phra - Moo3.

== Transport ==
=== Roads ===
- Highway 126 (Phitsanulok bypass road)
- National road 1064 (Phitsanulok-Bueng Phra)

=== Freight rail transport ===
PTT Public Company Limited operates a crude oil depot adjacent to Bueng Phra railway station (Moo3). SRT runs several oil freight services from this railway station to Mae Nam railway station in Chong Nonsi Subdistrict, Yan Nawa District, Bangkok. In 2019, that was a total of 866,931 tonnes.

== Electricity ==
All households in Bueng Phra subdistrict have access to the electricity grid of Provincial Electricity Authority (PEA).
