= Phu Khat Wildlife Sanctuary =

National park in northern Thailand

- เขตรักษาพันธุ์สัตร์ป่าภูขัด
- IUCN category Ia (strict nature reserve)
- Location within Thailand
- Location: Phitsanulok Province, Thailand
- Nearest city: Loei
- Coordinates: 17°15′N 101°00′E
- Area: 241 km^{2} (93 sq mi)
- Established: 2017
- Governing body: Department of National Parks, Wildlife and Plant Conservation

Phu Khat Wildlife Sanctuary (Thai: เขตรักษาพันธุ์สัตว์ป่าภูขัด; RTGS: Khet Raksa Phan Satpa Phu Khat) is a wildlife sanctuary in Nakhon Thai District of Thailand's Phitsanulok Province. The sanctuary covers an area of 241 square kilometres (93 sq mi) and was established in 2017.

== Geography ==
Phu Khat Wildlife Sanctuary is located about 100 kilometres (62 mi) northeast of city of Phitsanulok and 80 kilometres (50 mi) west of Loei town in Bo Pho, Na Bua, Nakhon Chum, Nam Kum and Yang Klon subdistricts, Nakhon Thai District of Phitsanulok Province.
The sanctuary's area is 241 square kilometres (93 sq mi) and is neighbouring Bo Pho Thi-Pak Thong Chai non-hunting area to the southeast, Ban Yang non-hunting area to the south and Namtok Chat Trakan National Park to the west. The small streams are tributaries of the Khwae Noi River.

== Topography ==
Landscape is covered by forested mountains, such as Khao Pha Pratu Miang >600 metres (2,000 feet), Khao Ya Pook >800 metres (2,600 feet), Phu Klang, Phu Khat >1,200 metres (3,900 feet). The area is divided into 40% high slope mountain area (upper slopes, shallow valleys, mountain tops and deeply incised streams), 57% hill slope area (open slopes, midslope ridges and u-shaped valleys) and 3% plains.

== Climate ==
The highest temperature in April is 38.3 °C (100.9 °F) and the lowest temperature in January is 11.9 °C (53.4 °F). The average amount of rainfall per year is 1,352 millimetres (53.2 in).

== Flora ==
The sanctuary is located in Chat Trakan, Daeng, Lam Khwae Noi Fang Sai, Nam Phak and Noen Pheum forests of Nakhon Thai District of Phitsanulok Province.
The sanctuary features dry deciduous forest, mixed deciduous forest, tropical evergreen forest and hill evergreen forest.

== Fauna ==
In the sanctuary are the following number of species: 29 mammals, 128 birds, 22 reptiles and 12 amphibians.
Two mammal species are listed as Endangered on the IUCN Red List:

- Asian wild dog (Cuon alpinus)
- Tiger (Panthera tigris)

Five mammal species are listed as Vulnerable:

- Asian black bear (Ursus thibetanus)
- Clouded leopard (Neofelis nebulosa)
- Fishing cat (Prionailurus viverrinus)
- Gaur (Bos gaurus)
- Red fox (Vulpes vulpes)

== Archaeology ==
In 2025, it was reported that two new archaeological sites were uncovered at the summit of Phu Khat Natural Sanctuary. The sites, located more than 1,300 meters above sea level, contain geometric rock carvings known as "Pha Pang Puey", which appear to be ancient human-made engravings rather than natural fractures.

== Location ==
Phu Khat Wildlife Sanctuary in overview PARO 11 (Phitsanulok)

13) Phu Khat Wildlife Sanctuary in overview PARO 11 (Phitsanulok)

	Wildlife sanctuary				
11	Mae Charim	12	Nam Pat	13	Phu Khat
14	Phu Miang-Phu Thong	15	Phu Pha Daeng	16	Tabo-Huai Yai
	National park			1	Khao Kho
2	Khwae Noi	3	Lam Nam Nan	4	Nam Nao
5	Namtok Chat Trakan	6	Phu Hin Rong Kla	7	Phu Soi Dao
8	Tat Mok	9	Thung Salaeng Luang	10	Ton Sak Yai

== See also ==
- List of protected areas of Thailand
- DNP - Phu Khat Wildlife Sanctuary
- List of Protected Areas Regional Offices of Thailand
