= Phu Miang–Phu Thong Wildlife Sanctuary =

Wildlife sanctuary in Thailand

Phu Miang—Phu Thong Wildlife Sanctuary
- เขตรักษาพันธุ์สัตร์ป่าภูเมี่ยง-ภูทอง
- IUCN category Ia (strict nature reserve)
- Location within Thailand
- Location: Phitsanulok, Uttaradit Provinces, Thailand
- Nearest city: Uttaradit
- Coordinates: 17°30′N 100°45′E
- Area: 696 km^{2} (269 sq mi)
- Established: 1977
- Governing body: Department of National Parks, Wildlife and Plant Conservation

Phu Miang—Phu Thong Wildlife Sanctuary (Thai: เขตรักษาพันธุ์สัตว์ป่าภูเมี่ยง—ภูทอง; RTGS: Khet Raksa Phan Satpa Phu Miang—Phu Thong) is a wildlife sanctuary in Chat Trakan District of Phitsanulok Province and Nam Pat District of Uttaradit Province of Thailand. The sanctuary covers an area of 696 square kilometres (269 sq mi) and was established in 1977.

== Geography ==
Phu Miang—Phu Thong Wildlife Sanctuary is located about 50 kilometres (31 mi) southeast of Uttaradit town in Ban Dong, Bo Phak, Chat Trakan and Pa Daeng subdistricts of Chat Trakan District of Phitsanulok Province and Nam Phai Subdistrict of Nam Pat District of Uttaradit Province.
The sanctuary's area is 696 square kilometres (269 sq mi) and is abutting Phu Soi Dao National Park to the north, Namtok Chat Trakan National Park to the southeast and Ton Sak Yai National Park to the west and neighbouring Nam Pat Wildlife Sanctuary to the north.

== Topography ==
Landscape is mostly covered by forested mountains, such as Khao Khwam Ruea 1,066 metres (3,497 ft), Khao Laem Ngam Laem Thon 1,140 metres (3,740 ft), Khao Lak Kachan 960 metres (3,150 ft), Khao Lon 865 metres (2,838 ft), Khao Thong 1,249 metres (4,098 ft) and Phu Miang is with 1,564 metres (5,131 ft) the highest. Most of the sanctuary has a slope between 16% and 35%.
The total forested area is 95%, divided into 35% high slope mountain area (upper-slopes, shallow valleys, mountain tops and deeply incised streams) and 60% hill slope area (open slopes, u-shaped valleys and midslope ridges).

== Climate ==
The annual average temperature is 29.0 °C (84.2 °F). The highest temperature in April is 34.2 °C (93.6 °F) and the lowest temperature in January is 24.0 °C (75.2 °F). The average amount of rainfall per year is 1,011 millimetres (39.8 in) and the highest amount of rainfall per month is 80.6 millimetres (3.17 in) in July.

== History ==
Phu Miang—Phu Thong forest in the area of Chat Trakan District, Phitsanulok Province and Nam Pat District, Uttaradit Province was declared a wildlife sanctuary, which was publized in the Government Gazette, volume 94, issue 137, dated December 31, 1977. Royal Forest Department extended the wildlife sanctuary with Bo Thong Subdistrict, Thong Saen Khan Minordistrict, Uttaradit Province, proclaimed in the Government Gazette, volume 106, issue 157, dated September 20, 1989. In 1992 the wildlife sanctuary was extended again, this time with Pa Daeng Subdistrict, Chat Trakan District, Phitsanulok Province, which was announced in the Government Gazette, volume 109, issue 42, dated April 8, 1992. Since 2002 this wildlife sanctuary has been managed by Protected Areas Regional Office 11 (Phitsanulok).

== Flora ==
The sanctuary features mixed deciduous forest (65%), hill evergreen forest (26%), agricultural area (4%), degraded forest (3%), dry evergreen forest and bamboo forest, each at less than 1%.

== Fauna ==
In the sanctuary are the following number of species: 67 mammals, 243 birds, 31 reptiles and 69 amphibians.

Mammals in the sanctuary are:

- Asian black bear (Ursus thibetanus)
- Asian elephant (Elaphus maximus)
- Asian wild dog (Cuon alpinus)
- Assam macaque (Macaca assamensis)
- Barking deer (Muntiacus spp.)
- Black flying squirrel (Aeromys tephromelas)
- Eurasian Otter (Lutra lutra)
- Flying squirrel (Petinomys spp.)
- Lar gibbon (Hylobates lar)
- Mainland serow (Capricornis sumatraensis)
- Red fox (Vulpes vulpes)
- Sun bear (Helarctos Malayanus)
- Wild boar (Sus scrofa)

Four mammal species are listed as Endangered on the IUCN Red List:

- Asian elephant (Elaphus maximus)
- Asian wild dog (Cuon alpinus)
- Assam macaque (Macaca assamensis)
- Lar gibbon (Hylobates lar)

Six mammal species are listed as Vulnerable:

- Asian black bear (Ursus thibetanus)
- Black flying squirrel (Aeromys tephromelas)
- Flying squirrel (Petinomys spp.)
- Mainland serow (Capricornis sumatraensis)
- Red fox (Vulpes vulpes)
- Sun bear (Helardtos Malayanus)

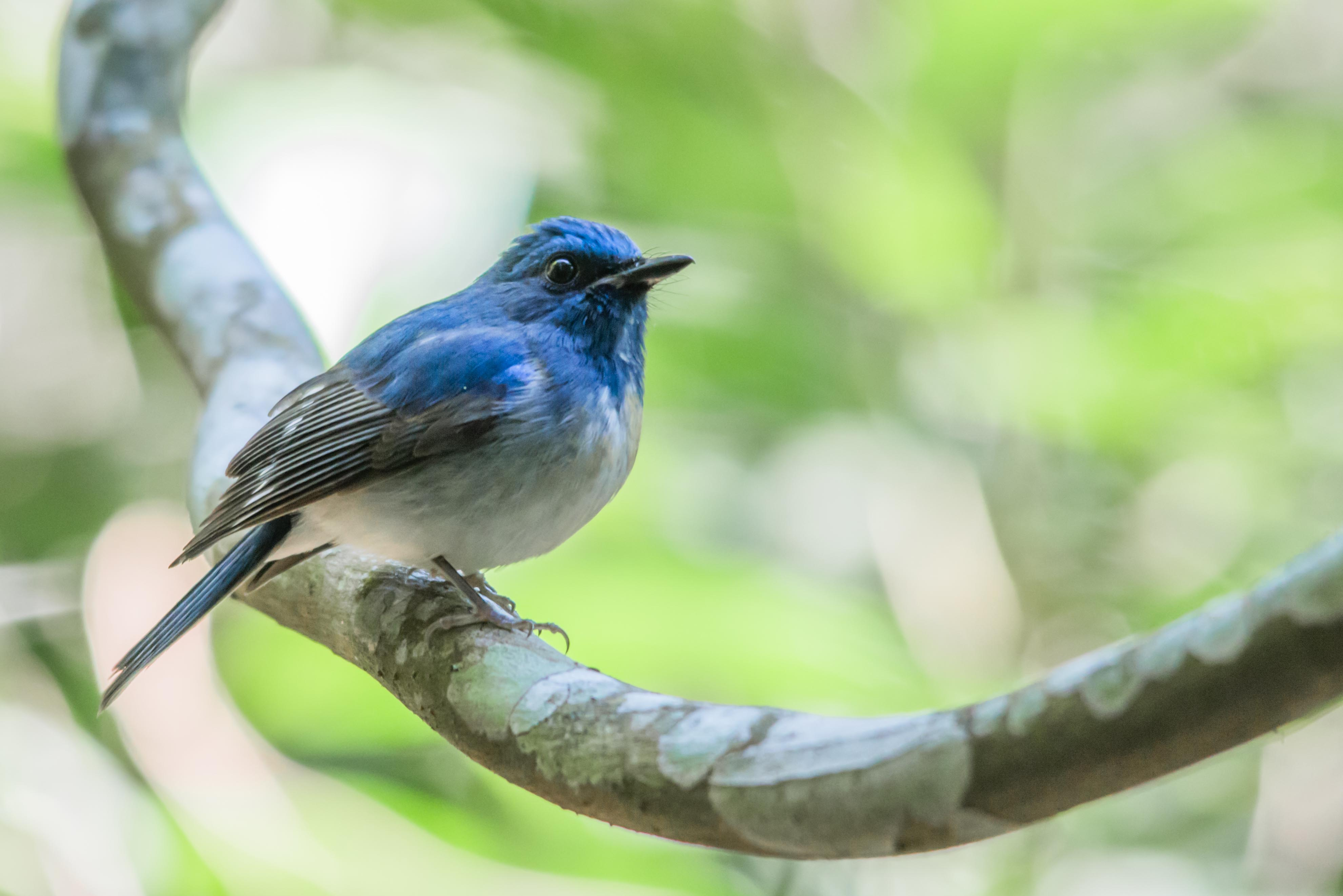
Hainan blue flycatcher

Birds in the sanctuary are:

- Asian brown flycatcher (Muscicapa dauurica)
- Black-crested bulbul (Rubigula flaviventris)
- Green-eared barbet (Psilopogon faiostrictus)
- Green-billed malkoha (Phaenicophaeus tristis)
- Hainan blue flycatcher (Cyornis hainanus)
- House swift (Apus nipalensis)
- Lineated barbet (Psilopogon lineatus)
- Olive-backed pipit (Anthus hodgsoni)
- Red junglefowl (Gallus gallus)
- Red-throated flycatcher (Ficedula albicilla)
- Scarlet-backed flowerpecker (Dicaeum cruentatum)
- Yellow-bellied sunbird (Cinnyris jugularis)

== Location ==
Phu Miang—Phu Thong Wildlife Sanctuary in overview PARO 11 (Phitsanulok)

14) Phu Miang—Phu Thong W.S. in overview PARO 11 (Phitsanulok)

	Wildlife sanctuary				
11	Mae Charim	12	Nam Pat	13	Phu Khat
14	Phu Miang—Phu Thong	15	Phu Pha Daeng	16	Tabo-Huai Yai
	National park			1	Khao Kho
2	Khwae Noi	3	Lam Nam Nan	4	Nam Nao
5	Namtok Chat Trakan	6	Phu Hin Rong Kla	7	Phu Soi Dao
8	Tat Mok	9	Thung Salaeng Luang	10	Ton Sak Yai

== See also ==
- List of protected areas of Thailand
- DNP - Phu Miang-Phu Thong Wildlife Sanctuary
- List of Protected Areas Regional Offices of Thailand
