= Ban Klang, Phitsanulok =

Coordinates: 16.976°N 100.56°E

Ban Klang บ้านกลาง
- Subdistrict
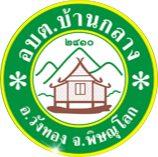
- Seal
- Interactive map of Ban Klang
- Country: Thailand
- Province: Phitsanulok
- District: Wang Thong

Government
  - Type: Subdistrict administrative organization (SAO)

Area
  - Total: 326.5 km^{2} (126.1 sq mi)

Population (2022)
  - Total: 20,074
  - Density: 61/km^{2} (160/sq mi)
- Time zone: UTC+7 (ICT)
- Postal code: 65130
- Calling code: 055
- ISO 3166 code: TH-650804
- LAo CODE: 06650809
- Website: www.banklang-pitlok.go.th

Ban Klang (Thai: บ้าทกลาง) is a subdistrict in Wang Thong district, Phitsanulok province. The subdistrict has a wide forest, mountainous with a flat area interspersed with hills. In 2025 it had a population of 20,074. The economy is mainly based on agriculture.

== Geography ==
The topography of Ban Klang subdistrict is a wide forest, Khao Krayang Forest and Wang Thong River Basin (forest right), mountainous with a flat area interspersed with hills and is located in the lower northern part of Thailand. From the subdistrict is northern part of Khwae Noi National Park and western part of Khao Noi–Khao Pradu Non-hunting Area. The subdistrict is bordered to the north by Khan Chong subdistrict, Wat Bot district and Suan Miang subdistrict, Chat Trakan district, to the east by Nong Kathao subdistrict, Nakhon Thai district, to the south by Kaeng Sopha and Wang Nok Aen subdistricts, Mueang Phitsanulok district, to the west by Don Thong subdistrict, Mueang Phitsanulok district and Ban Yang subdistrict, Wat Bot district. North of the subdistrict, the Khwae Noi River flows into the reservoir of the Khwae Noi Bamrung Daen Dam and lies in the Nan Basin, which is part of the Chao Phraya Watershed.

== Economy ==
The economy of Ban Klang subdistrict depends on rice farming, mixed farming (cassave, sugar cane, corn), fruit plantations (mango, custard apple, guave, longan, maprang), rubber plantations and fast-growing trees such as eucalyptus and teak.

== Administration ==
=== Provincial government ===
The administration of Ban Klang subdistrict is responsible for an area that covers 204,080 rai ~ 326.5 square kilometres (126.1 sq mi) and consists of twenty-seven administrative villages, as of 2025: 20,074 people and 7,209 families.

Ban Klang subdistrict with villages

Village	English	Thai	People
Moo1	Ban Nong Prue	บ้านหนองปรือ	1,074
Moo2	Ban Klang	บ้านกลาง	454
Moo3	Ban Namrin	บ้านน้ำริน	1,103
Moo4	Ban Noen Sawang	บ้านเนินสว่ง	1,385
Moo5	Ban Na Phran	บ้านนาพราน	495
Moo6	Ban Mai Chai Charoen	น้ำนใหม่ชัยเจริญ	916
Moo7	Ban Nam Yang	บ้านน้ำยาง	1,095
Moo8	Ban Hin Prakai	บ้านหินประกาย	1,123
Moo9	Ban Chum Saeng	บ้านชุมแสง	703
Moo10	Ban Sam Wai	น้ำนซำหวาย	708
Moo11	Ban Mai Phanom Thong	บ้านใหม่พนมทอง	689
Moo12	Ban Thung Eyang	บ้านทุ่งเอี้ยง	541
Moo13	Ban Sam Thong Phatthana	บ้านซำทองพัฒนา	520
Moo14	Ban Pa Khanun	บ้านป่าขนุน	850
Moo15	Ban Khao Chee	บ้านเขาชี	419
Moo16	Ban Sam Tong	บ้านซำต้อง	721
Moo17	Ban Tanom	บ้านตานม	682
Moo18	Ban Sap Khlong Klang	บ้านทรัพย์คลองกลาง	523
Moo19	Ban Na Nuea	บ้านนาเหนือ	814
Moo20	Ban Sap Sombun	ทรัพย์สมบูรณ์	939
Moo21	Ban Saphan Sam	บ้านสะพานสาม	364
Moo22	Ban Noen Phatthana	เนินพัฒนา	637
Moo23	Ban Phrai Ngam	บ้านไพรงาม	665
Moo24	Ban Mai Chai Mongkhon	บ้านใหม่ชัยมงคล	835
Moo25	Ban Namrin Song	บ้านน้ำรินสอง	611
Moo26	Ban Mai Samtoey	บ้านใหม่ซำเตย	661
Moo27	Ban Plai Na	บ้านปลายนา	547

=== Local government ===
Ban Klang is a subdistrict administrative organization - SAO (Thai: องค์การบริหารส่วนตำบลบ้านกลาง, romanized: ongkan borihan suan tambon Ban Klang, abbreviated: อบต.บ้านกลาง, o bo toh Ban Klang), which covers the whole tambon Ban Klang.

For FY2022, the revenues and expenditures of Ban Klang SAO were as follows:

Revenue of Ban Klang SAO per million baht
Total	Taxes, duties	Fees, fines	Property	Commerce	Varied	Subsidies	Others
129.8	48.7	0.1	1.0	0.1	0.1	79.8	0.0

Expenditure of Ban Klang SAO per million baht
Total	Central fund	Personnel	Operations	Investments	Subsidies	Others
102.0	32.3	17.8	14.3	29.9	7.7	0.0

The profit corresponds to 27.8 million baht (US$ 0.8 million).

== Temples ==
Ban Klang subdistrict is home to the following active temples, where Theravada Buddhism is practiced by local residents.

Temple name	Thai	Location
Wat Nong Prue	วัดหนองปรือ	Moo1
Wat Ban Klang	วัดบ้านกลาง	Moo2
Wat Namrin Charoentham	วัดน้ำรินเจิญธรรม	Moo3
Wat Noen Sawang Wararam	วัดเนินสว่งวาราม	Moo4
Wat Na Phran Samakkheetham	วัดนาพรานสามัคคีธรรม	Moo5
Wat Chai Charoen Bamrungtham	วัดชัยเจริญบำรุงธรรม	Moo6
Wat Ratcha Charoen Chai	วัดราชเจริญชัย	Moo7
Wat Hin Prakai	วัดหินประกาย	Moo8
Wat Sam Wai	วัดซำหวาย	Moo10
Wat Huai Hin Fon Charoen Tham	วัดห้วยหินฝนเจริญธรรม	Moo14
Wat Khao Phanom Rangsi	วัดเขาพนมรังสี	Moo15
Wat Khlong Tanom Sattharam	วัดคลองตานมศรัทธาราม	Moo17
Wat Chai Mongkon	วัดชัยมงคล	Moo24

== Education ==
The following elementary/secondary schools are located in Ban Klang subdistrict.

- Ban Nong Prue school - Moo1
- Ban Klang school - Moo2
- Ban Namrin school - Moo3
- Ban Noen Sawang school - Moo4
- Ban Mai Chai Charoen school - Moo6
- Ban Nam Yang school - Moo7
- Ban Sam Wai school - Moo10
- Ban Mai Phanom Thong school - Moo11
- Ban Pa Kanun school - Moo14

== Healthcare ==
There are three health-promoting hospitals in Ban Klang subdistrict.

- Ban Nong Prue h.p.h. - Moo1
- Chalerm Phrakiat h.p.h. - Moo4
- Ban Mai Chai Charoen h.p.h. - Moo6
