= Wang Nok Aen =

Coordinates: 16.83°N 100.48°E

Wang Nok Aen วังนกแอ่น
- Subdistrict
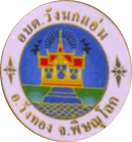
- Seal
- Interactive map of Wang Nok Aen
- Country: Thailand
- Province: Phitsanulok
- District: Wang Thong

Government
  - Type: Subdistrict administrative organization (SAO)

Area
  - Total: 533.7 km^{2} (206.1 sq mi)

Population (2025)
  - Total: 16,271
  - Density: 30/km^{2} (78/sq mi)
- Time zone: UTC+7 (ICT)
- Postal code: 65130
- Calling code: 055
- ISO 3166 code: TH-650808
- LAO code: 06650810
- Website: www.wangnokan.go.th

Wang Nok Aen (Thai: วังนกแอ่น) is a sub-district in the Wang Thong District of Phitsanulok Province. It is connected to Highway 12. In 2025 it had a population of 16,271

== Geography ==
The subdistrict is located in the lower northern part of Thailand and is bordered to the north by Ban Klang, Kaeng Sopha subdistricts, Wang Thong district and Ban Yaeng subdistrict, Nakhon Thai district, to the east by Huai Hia subdistrict, Nakhon Thai district and Phetchabun province, to the south by Chomphu subdistrict, Noen Maprang district and Tha Muen Ram subdistrict, Wang Thong district, to the west by Din Thong, Chai Nam subdistricts, Wang Thong district and Don Thong subdistrict, Mueang Phitsanulok district.
The eastern part of the subdistrict is located in Thung Salaeng Luang National Park. In the national reserved forest are: north of highway 12 Wang Thong River Basin (forest right) and southwest of highway 12 Wang Thong River Basin (forest left). Wang Nok Aen lies in the Nan Basin, which is part of the Chao Phraya Watershed. Highway 12 runs through the subdistrict.

== Administration ==
=== Provincial government ===
The administration of Wang Nok Aen subdistrict is responsible for an area that covers 333,587 rai ~ 533.7 square kilometres (206.1 sq mi) and consists of 20 administrative villages, as of 2025: 16,271 people of 7,246 families.

Wang Nok Aen subdistrict with villages

Village	English	Thai	People
Moo1	Ban Wang Dinso	บ้านวังดินสอ	1,272
Moo2	Wang Nok Aen	บ้านวังนกแอ่น	1,412
Moo3	Ban Bo	บ้านบ่อ	1,075
Moo4	Ban Nam Phrom	บ้านน้ำพรม	776
Moo5	Ban Tha Kham	บ้านท่าข้าม	685
Moo6	Ban Wang Tat	บ้านวังตาด	1,300
Moo7	Ban Kaeng Chung Nang	บ้านแก่งจูงนาง	1,216
Moo8	Ban Huai Phai	บ้านห้วยไผ่	621
Moo9	Ban Cham Takhian	บ้านซำตะเคียน	921
Moo10	Ban Phai Yai	บ้านไผ่ใหญ่	928
Moo11	Ban Pa Makrut	บ้านป่ามะกรูด	628
Moo12	Ban Huai Duea	บ้านห้วยเดื่อ	145
Moo13	Ban To Ruea	บ้านตอเรือ	861
Moo14	Ban Cham Nok Lueang	บ้านซำนกเหลือง	547
Moo15	Ban Prongphun	บ้านโปร่งพลู	670
Moo16	Ban Paknam Poi	บ้านปากน้ำปอย	594
Moo17	Ban Mai Lam Kradon	บ้านใหม่ลำกระโดน	968
Moo18	Ban Kaeng Charoen	บ้านแก่งเจริญ	424
Moo19	Ban Wang Krabak	บ้านวังกะบาก	527
Moo20	Ban Saen Suk Phatthana	บ้านแสนสุขพัฒนา	701

=== Local government ===
Wang Nok Aen is a subdistrict administrative organization - SAO (Thai: องค์การบริหารส่วนตำบลวังนกแอ่น, romanized: ongkan borihan suan tambon Wang Nok Aen, abbreviated: อบต.วังนกแอ่น, o bo toh Wang Nok Aen), which covers the whole tambon Wang Nok Aen.

For FY2021, the revenues and expenditures of Wang Nok Aen SAO were as follows:

Revenue of Wang Nok Aen SAO per million baht
Total	Taxes, duties	Fees, fines	Property	Commerce	Varied	Subsidies	Others
107.5	42.0	0.1	0.8	0.0	0.2	62.6	1.8

Expenditure of Wang Nok Aen SAO per million baht
Total	Central fund	Personnel	Operations	Investments	Subsidies	Others
88.3	27.1	16.0	11.1	28.1	6.0	0.0

The profit corresponds to 19.2 million baht (US$ 0.6 million).

== Temples ==
Wang Nok Aen subdistrict is home to the following active temples, where Theravada Buddhism is practiced by local residents of which nine Maha Nikai and three Dhammayut temples.

Temple name	Thai	Location
Wat Wang Dinso	วัดวังดินสอ	Moo1
Wat Wang Nok Aen	วัดวังนกแอ่น	Moo2
Wat Ban Bo Wararam	วัดบ้านบ่อวราราม	Moo3
Wat Pa Wang Saeng Tham	วัดป่าวังแสงธรรม	Moo3
Wat Nam Phrom	วัดน้ำพรม	Moo4
Wat Tha Kham Mettatham	วัดท่าข้ามเมตตาธรรม	Moo5
Wat Wang Chomphu Thong	วัดวังชมพูทอง	Moo6
Wat Wang Tat Rattanaram	วัดวังตาดรัตนาราม	Moo6
Wat Pa Hua Khao	วัดป่าห้วเขา	Moo14
Wat Lam Kradon	วัดลำกระโดน	Moo17
Wat Mai Sai Mun	วัดใหม่ทรายมูล	Moo17
Wat Si Phromchak	วัดศรีพรหมจักร	Moo19

== Education ==
The following elementary/secondary schools are located in Wang Nok Aen subdistrict.

- Ban Wang Dinso school - Moo1
- Ban Wang Nok Aen school - Moo2
- Ban Nam Phrom school - Moo4
- Ban Tha Kham school - Moo5
- Ban Wang Tat school - Moo6
- Ban Kaeng Chung Nang school - Moo7
- Ban Cham Takhian school - Moo9
- Ban Phai Yai school - Moo10
- Ban Pa Makrut school - Moo11
- Ban To Ruea school - Moo13
- Sarit Sena school - Moo19

== Healthcare ==
=== Hospital ===
There is one hospital in the subdistrict:

- Fort Saritsena Hospital with 15 beds.

=== Health promoting hospitals ===
There are four health-promoting hospitals in Wang Nok Aen subdistrict.

- Wang Nok Aen h.p.h. - Moo6
- Ban Phai Yai h.p.h. - Moo10
- Ban Nam Phrom h.p.h. - Moo16
- Ban Saen Suk Phatthana h.p.h. - Moo20
