= Nong Kathao =

Nong Kathao หนองกะท้าว
- Tambon
- Interactive map of Nong Kathao
- Coordinates: 16°59′00″N 100°47′00″E
- Country: Thailand
- Province: Phitsanulok
- District: Nakhon Thai
- Elevation: 308 m (1,010 ft)

Population (2005)
  - Total: 15,470
- Time zone: UTC+7 (ICT)
- Postal code: 65120
- Geocode: 650202

Nong Kathao (Thai: หนองกะท้าว) is a subdistrict in the Nakhon Thai District of Phitsanulok Province, Thailand.

== Geography ==
Nong Kathao is bordered to the north by Tha Sakae, to the east by Noen Phoem, to the south by Huai Hia and to the west by Kaeng Sopha.

Nong Kathao lies in the Nan Basin, which is part of the Chao Phraya Watershed.

== Administration ==
The following is a list of the subdistrict's mubans (villages):

No.	English	Thai
1	Ban Na Pho	บ้านนาโพธิ์
2	Ban Na Chan	บ้านนาจาน
3 - 4	Ban Nong Kathao	บ้านหนองกะท้าว
5	Ban Non	บ้านโนน
6	Ban Nanong	บ้านนาหนอง
7	Ban Lang Kao	บ้านหลังเขา
8	Ban Kaeng Hwa	บ้านแก่งหว้า
9	Ban Non Ta Phon	บ้านโนนตาโพน
10	Ban Pho Sadet	บ้านโพธิ์เสด็จ
11	Ban Kaeng Hai	บ้านแก่งไฮ
12	Ban Non Nagam	บ้านโนนนาก่าม
13	Ban Non Magluea	บ้านโนนมะเกลือ
14	Ban Glang	บ้านกลาง
15	Ban Pasak	บ้านป่าสัก
16	Ban Bang Yang Phattana	บ้านบางยางพัฒนา
17	Ban Nam Tak	บ้านน้ำตาก
18	Ban Bung	บ้านบุ่ง
19	Ban Huai Gaeo	บ้านห้วยแก้ว
20	Ban Noen Glang	บ้านเนินกลาง
21	Ban Nam Dan	บ้านน้ำดั้น
22	Ban Noen Phluang	บ้านเนินพลวง
23	Ban Pho Jaroen	บ้านโพธ์เจริญ
24	Ban Rai Wang Ngern	บ้านไร่วังเงิน
25	Ban Huai Soem	บ้านห้วยเซิม
26	Ban Pong Din Dam	บ้านโป่งดินดำ
27	Ban Chai Thung	บ้านชายทุ่ง

== Points of interest ==
The following points of interest are located within the subdistrict:

- Ruins of an ancient temple ป่าแดงเขาวัด
- Huai Roo Lake
- Nakhon Thai Office of Primary Education
- Nakhon Thai Department of Public Health
- Phitsanulok Animal Species Conservation Center
