= Nakhon Thai =

Nakhon Thai may refer to:

- Nakhon Thai District
- Nakhon Thai Subdistrict
