= Bo Pho =

Bo Pho บ่อโพธิ์
- Tambon
- Interactive map of Bo Pho
- Coordinates: 17°13′00″N 101°05′00″E
- Country: Thailand
- Province: Phitsanulok
- District: Nakhon Thai District

Population (2005)
  - Total: 7,124
- Time zone: UTC+7 (ICT)
- Postal code: 65120
- Geocode: 650209

Bo Pho (Thai: บ่อโพธิ์) is a subdistrict in the Nakhon Thai District of Phitsanulok Province, Thailand.

== Geography ==
Bo Pho is bordered to the north by Yang Klon, to the east by Loei Province, to the south by Noen Phoem, and to the west by Nakhon Thai. Bo Pho lies in the Nan Basin, which is part of the Chao Phraya Watershed.

== Administration ==
The following is a list of the subdistrict's mubans (villages):

No.	English	Thai
1	Ban Bo Pho	บ้านบ่อโพธิ์
2	Ban Nam Lao	บ้านน้ำเลา
3	Ban Pa Ruak	บ้านป่ารวก
4	Ban Kaeng Thung	บ้านแก่งทุ่ง
5	Ban Na Ta Dee	บ้านนาตาดี
6	Ban Noen Sawan	บ้านเนินสวรรค์
7	Ban Khok Khlai	บ้านโคกคล้าย
8	Ban Pa Bong	บ้านป่าบง
9	Ban Wang Chomphu	บ้านวังชมภู
10	Ban Pa Po Pit	บ้านป่าปอปิด
11	Ban Khok Noen Thong	บ้านโคกเนินทอง
12	Ban Mai Anamai	บ้านใหม่อนามัย
13	Ban Mai Thai Jaroen	บ้านใหม่ไทยเจริญ
