= Chat Trakan =

Chat Trakan may refer to:

- Chat Trakan District
- Chat Trakan Subdistrict
