= Nam Kum =

Nam Kum น้ำกุ่ม
- Tambon
- Interactive map of Nam Kum
- Coordinates: 17°16′00″N 100°47′00″E
- Country: Thailand
- Province: Phitsanulok
- District: Nakhon Thai District

Population (2005)
  - Total: 2,626
- Time zone: UTC+7 (ICT)
- Postal code: 65120
- Geocode: 650207

Nam Kum (Thai: น้ำกุ่ม) is a subdistrict in the Nakhon Thai District of Phitsanulok Province, Thailand.

== Geography ==
Nam Kum is the northernmost subdistrict in Nakhon Thai. It is bordered to the northwest by Chat Trakan District, to the east by Loei Province, and to the south by Nakhon Chum. The subdistrict is primarily mountainous terrain, as it is in the Phetchabun Mountains. Nam Kum lies in the Nan Basin, which is part of the Chao Phraya Watershed.

== Administration ==
The following is a list of the subdistrict's mubans (villages):

No.	English	Thai
1	Ban Na Wong Khong	บ้านนาวงฆ้อง
2	Ban Nam Kum	บ้านน้ำกุ่ม
3	Ban Pong Pia	บ้านโป่งเปี้ย
4	Ban Na Faek	บ้านนาแฝก
5	Ban Na Hin	บ้านนาหิน
6	Ban Pong So	บ้านโป่งสอ
7	Ban Bung Pha	บ้านบุ่งผำ

== Temples ==
Nam Kum is home to the following two temples:

- Wat Pho Sai (Thai: วัดโพธิ์ไทร) in Ban Nam Kun
- Wat Pho Tharam (Thai: วัดโพธาราม) in Ban Na Faek
