= Kaeng Sopha =

Coordinates: 16.903°N 100.642°E

Kaeng Sopha แก่งโสภา
- Subdistrict
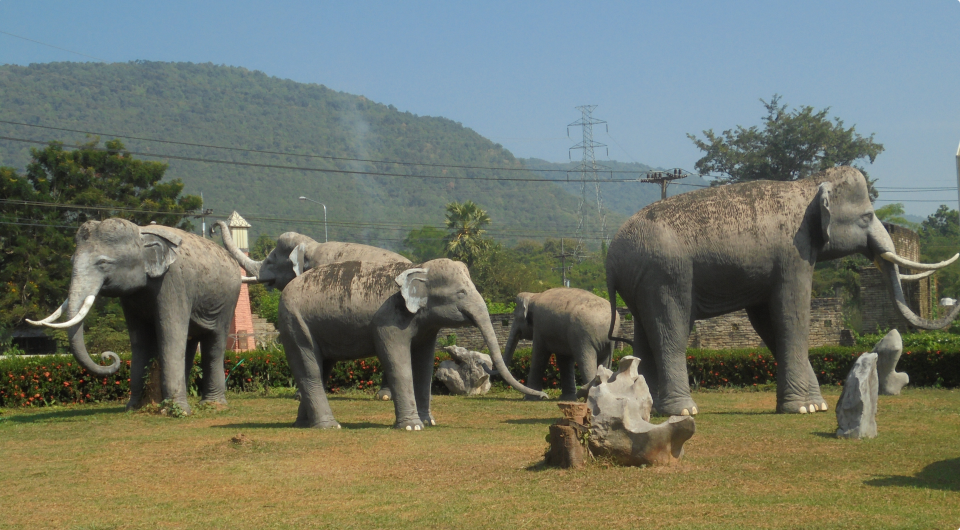
- Sappraiwan elephant sanctuary

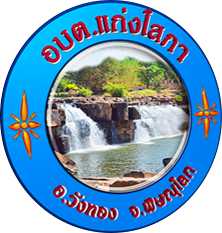
- Seal
- Interactive map of Kaeng Sopha
- Country: Thailand
- Province: Phitsanulok
- District: Wang Thong

Government
  - Type: Subdistrict administrative organization (SAO)

Area
  - Total: 204.4 km^{2} (78.9 sq mi)

Population (2025)
  - Total: 10,445
  - Density: 52/km^{2} (130/sq mi)
- Time zone: UTC+7 (ICT)
- Postal code: 65130
- Calling code: 055
- ISO 3166 code: TH-650806
- LAO code: 06650805
- Website: www.kaengsopha.go.th

Kaeng Sopha (Thai: แก่งโสภา) is a subdistrict in Wang Thong district, Phitsanulok province. It is connected to Highway 12. In 2025 it had a population of 10,445. The economy is mainly based on agriculture and animal husbandry.

== Geography ==
The topography of Kaeng Sopha subdistrict is a plateau and mountain, of which the area slopes from north to south and is located in the lower northern part of Thailand. The subdistrict is bordered to the north by Ban Klang subdistrict, Wang Thong District, to the east by Ban Yaeng subdistrict, Nakhon Thai District, to the south and west by Wang Nok Aen subdistrict, Wang Thong district. Approximately 70 percent of the area of the subdistrict is in the national reserved forest, namely Khao Krayang forest, Khek River forest and Wang Thong River Basin (forest right). The Wang Thong River flows south of the subdistrict and lies in the Nan Basin, which is part of the Chao Phraya Watershed. Highway 12 runs south of the subdistrict.

== Administration ==
=== Provincial government ===
The administration of Kaeng Sopha subdistrict is responsible for an area that covers 127,768 rai ~ 204.4 square kilometres (78.9 sq mi) and consists of thirteen administrative villages, as of 2025: 10,445 people and 4,947 families.

Kaeng Sopha subdistrict with villages

Village	English	Thai	People
Moo1	Ban Poi	บ้านปอย	624
Moo2	Ban Kaeng Kula	บ้านแก่งกุลา	497
Moo3	Ban Huai Phlu	บ้านห้วยพลู	871
Moo4	Ban Khao Noi	บ้านเขาน้อย	804
Moo5	Ban Muang Hom	บ้านม่วงหอม	1,231
Moo6	Ban Lao Ya	น้ำนเหล่าหญ้า	670
Moo7	Ban Sap Praiwan	บ้านทรัพย่ไพวัลย์	1,720
Moo8	Ban Sap Charoen	บ้านทรัพย์เจริญ	434
Moo9	Ban Kaeng Song	บ้านแก่งซอง	612
Moo10	Ban Pong Pa	น้ำนโป่งปะ	569
Moo11	Ban Noi Muang Hom	บ้านน้อยม่วงหอม	1,267
Moo12	Ban Kaeng Kula Nuea	บ้านแก่งกุลาเหนือ	323
Moo13	Ban Mai Khao Noi	บ้านใหม่เขาน้อย	815

=== Local government ===
Kaeng Sopha is a subdistrict administrative organization - SAO (Thai: องค์การบริหารส่วนตำบลแก่งโสภา, romanized: ongkan borihan suan tambon Kaeng Sopha, abbreviated: อบต.แก่งโสภา, o bo toh Kaeng Sopha), which covers the whole tambon Kaeng Sopha.

For FY2022, the revenues and expenditures of Kaeng Sopha SAO were as follows:

Revenue of Kaeng Sopha SAO per million baht
Total	Taxes, duties	Fees, fines	Property	Commerce	Varied	Subsidies	Others
67.7	32.7	0.1	0.3	0.0	0.1	34.7	0.0

Expenditure of Kaeng Sopha SAO per million baht
Total	Central fund	Personnel	Operations	Investments	Subsidies	Others
50.7	19.4	16.4	8.9	1.4	4.6	0.0

The profit corresponds to 17.0 million baht (US$ 0.5 million).

== Temples ==
Kaeng Sopha subdistrict is home to the following active temples, where Theravada Buddhism is practiced by local residents.

Temple name	Thai	Location
Wat Poi Sattharam	วัดปอยศรัทธาธรรม	Moo1
Wat Pak Yang	วัดปากยาง	Moo2
Wat Huai Phlu Siltecho	วัดห้วยพลูสีลเตโช	Moo3
Wat Khao Noi Si Rattanaram	วัดเขาน้อยศริรัตนาราม	Moo4
Wat Muang Hom	วัดม่วงหอม	Moo5
Wat Khao Noi	วัดเขาน้อย	Moo6
Wat Sa Kaeo Samakkheetham	วัดสระแก้วสามัคคีธรรม	Moo7
Wat Sap Praiwan	วัดทรัพย์ไพรวัลย์	Moo7
Wat Sopharam	วัดโสภาราม	Moo7
Wat Aranyawasi Khiri Banphot	วัดอรัญวาศรีคีรีบรรพต	Moo9

== Economy ==
Employment is as follows:

- Agriculture 70%
- Animal husbandry 13%
- Trade 9 %
- Other 8 %

== Education ==
The following elementary/secondary schools are located in Kaeng Sopha.

- Huai Phlu school - Moo3
- Sappraiwan school - Moo3
- Ban Muang Hom school - Moo5
- Ban Pak Yang school - Moo8
- Pa Mai Uthit school - Moo9
- Ban Pong Pa school - Moo10
- Ban Kaeng Kula Samakkhee school - Moo12

== Healthcare ==
There is Kaeng Sopha health-promoting hospital in Moo7.

== Transportation ==
The subdistrict along highway 12 westbound (Phitsanulok route) and 12 eastbound (Lom Sak route) is approximately 30 kilometers east of Phitsanulok.

== Places ==
Waterfalls Wang Thong River (downstream - right to left)

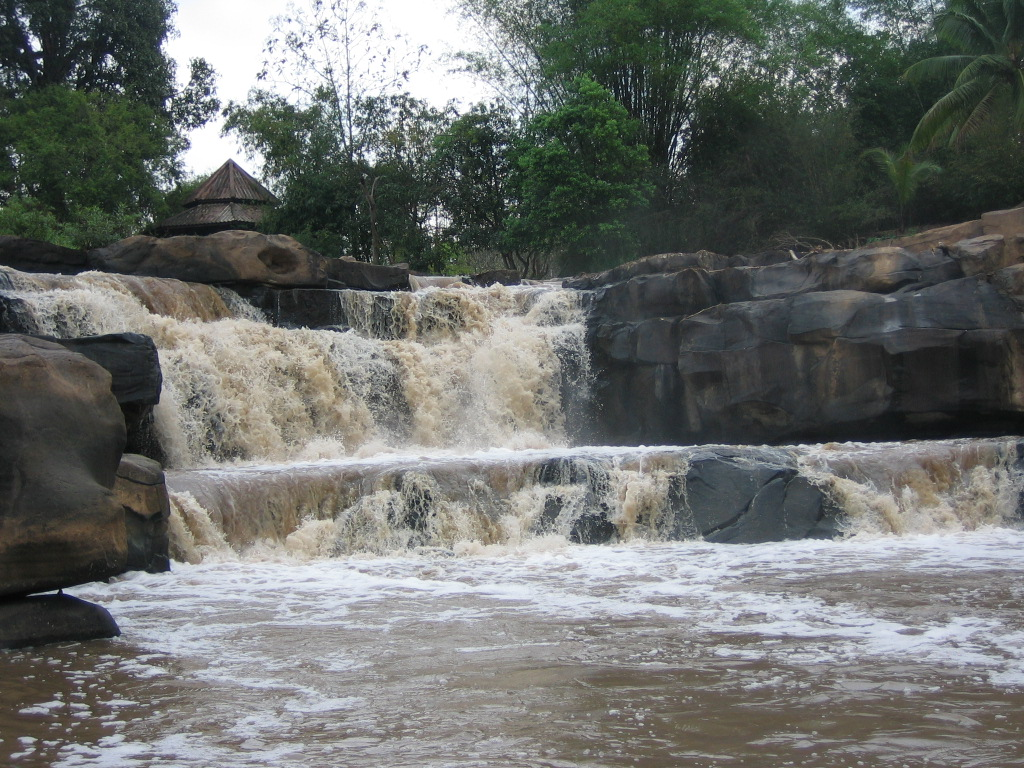
Kaeng Song waterfall

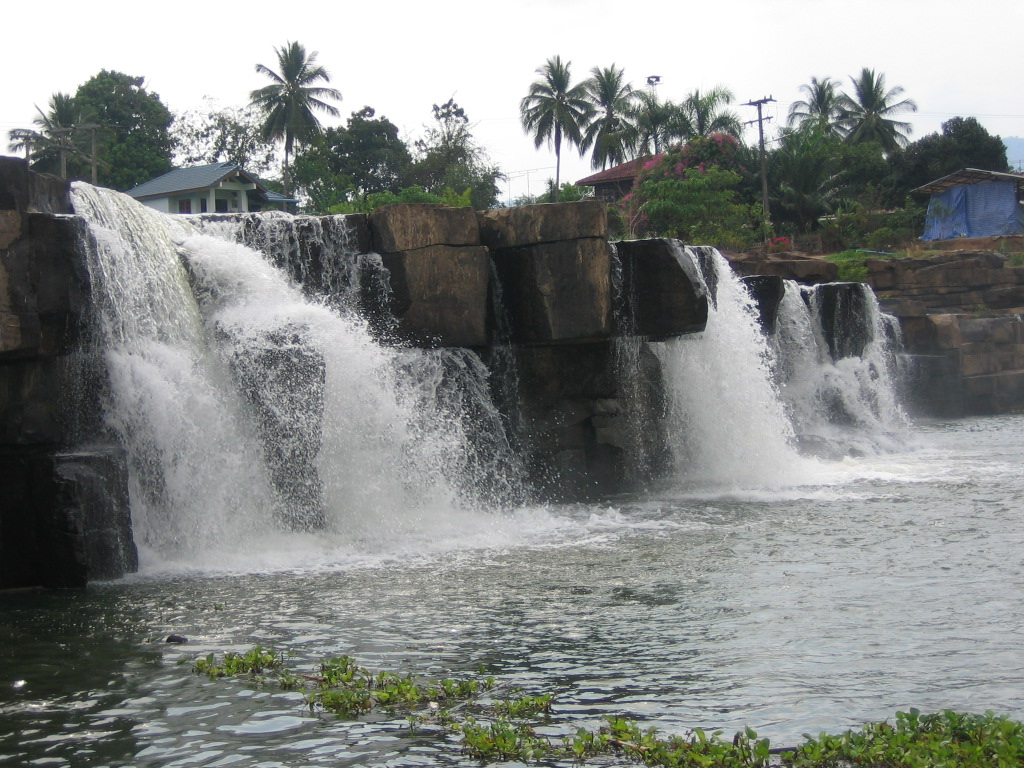
Poi waterfall

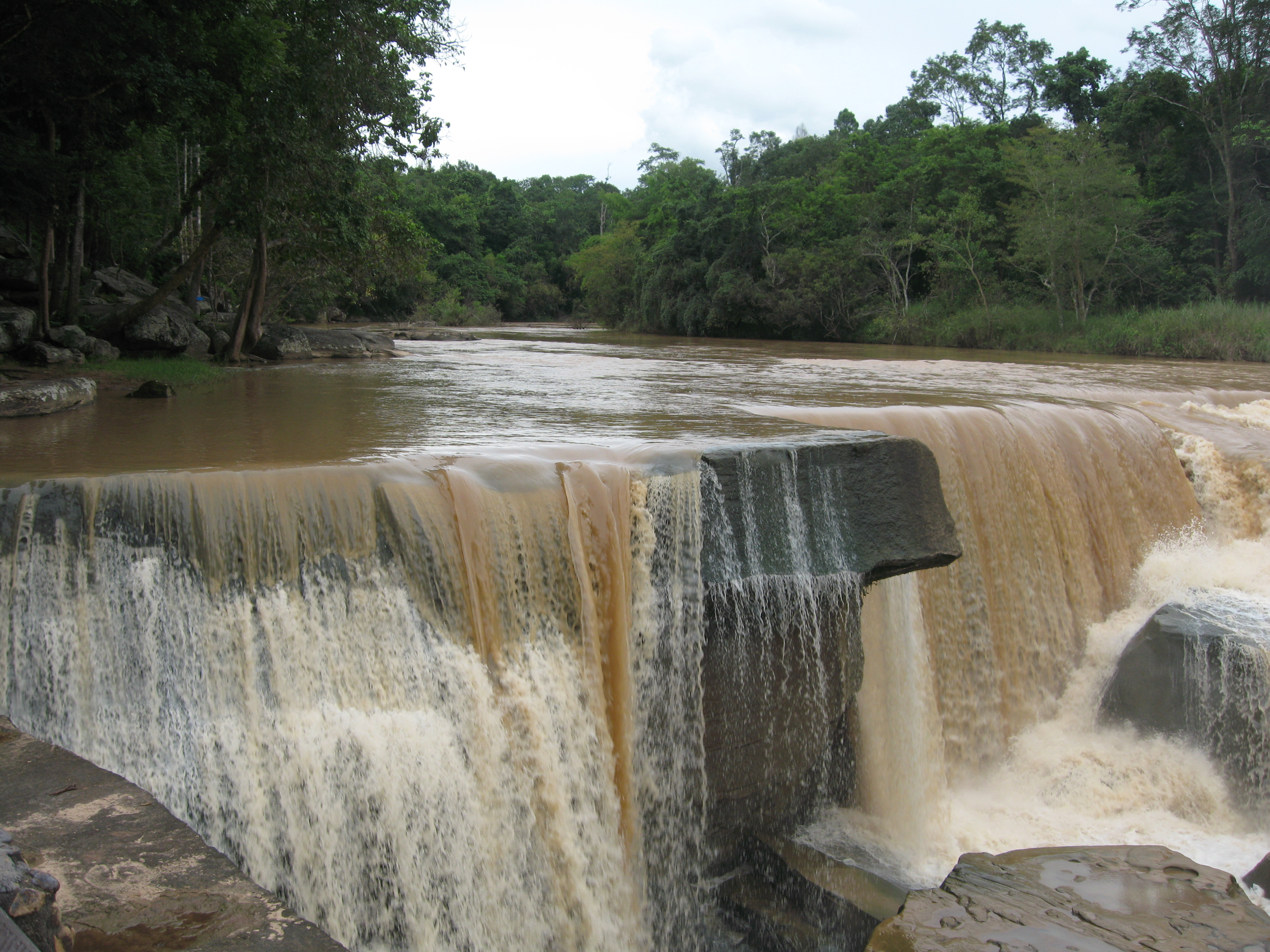
Kaeng Sopha waterfall
