= Wang Thong municipality =

Coordinates: 16.81°N 100.43°E

Wang Thong วังทอง
- Subdistrict municipality
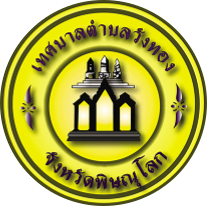
- Seal
- Interactive map of Wang Thong
- Country: Thailand
- Province: Phitsanulok
- District: Wang Thong

Government
  - Type: Subdistrict municipality

Area
  - Total: 1.8 km^{2} (0.69 sq mi)

Population (2025)
  - Total: 3,926
  - Density: 2,180/km^{2} (5,600/sq mi)
- Time zone: UTC+7 (ICT)
- Postal code: 65130
- Calling code: 055
- ISO 3166 code: TH-650801
- LAO code: 05650801
- Website: wt.go.th

Wang Thong municipality (Thai: เทศบาลวังทอง) is a subdistrict municipality (thesaban tambon) in Wang Thong district, in Phitsanulok province. It lies at the intersection of Highways 11 and 12, 17 kilometres (11 mi) east of Phitsanulok city and 380 kilometres (240 mi) north of Bangkok. The economy is based on trading.

== History ==
Originally named Talat Chum, on 17 April 1939 it was renamed Wang Thong. On 24 February 1999 the status of Wang Thong sanitary was upgraded to Wang Thong subdistrict municipality.

== Geography ==
The topography of Wang Thong municipality is flat plains and is located in the lower northern part of Thailand. The municipality is bordered to the north by villages Moo13 Ban Nam Yen and Moo5 Ban Nong Suea, Wang Thong subdistrict administrative organization - SAO, to the east by Wang Thong River, to the south by villages Moo4 Ban Bang Saphan and Moo14 Ban Nong Bon, Wang Thong SAO and to the west by villages Moo14 Ban Nong Bon and Moo1 Ban Wang Thong, Wang Thong SAO. The Wang Thong River flows east of the municipality and lies in the Nan Basin, which is part of the Chao Phraya Watershed.

== Administration ==
=== Local government ===
Wang Thong municipality is a subdistrict municipality (thesaban tambon), which covers three administrative villages, Moo1 (part east), Moo2 (Than Prong) and Moo3 (Nam Duan), with an area of 1.8 square kilometres (0.69 sq mi) with a population of 3,926 people from 1,756 families.

Wang Thong subdistrict municipality with villages

Village	English	Thai	People
Moo1	Ban Wang Thong (part east)	บ้านวังทอง	1,667
Moo2	Ban Than Prong	บ้านตาลโปร่ง	861
Moo3	Ban Nam Duan	บ้านน้ำด้วน	1,337

For FY2022, the revenues and expenditures of Wang Thong subdistrict municipality were as follows:

Revenue of Wang Thong subdistrict municipality per million baht
Total	Taxes, duties	Fees, fines	Property	Commerce	Varied	Subsidies	Others
57.3	27.2	0.5	1.9	0.0	0.0	27.7	0.0

Expenditure of Wang Thong subdistrict municipality per million baht
Total	Central fund	Personnel	Operations	Investments	Subsidies	Others
46.4	13.0	14.3	12.0	1.3	2.6	3.2

The profit corresponds to 10.9 million baht (US$ 0.3 million).

==== Communities ====
There are a total of six communities (chumchon). Although not directly chosen by the local citizens, they provides advice and recommendations to the local administrative organization.

Communities of Wang Thong municipality

	Community name	Village
No.1	Wang Thong Thani	Moo3
No.2	Mitraphap	Moo1
No.3	Than Prong	Moo2
No.4	Kok Makham Jay	Moo1
No.5	Talat Wang Thong	Moo1
No.6	Ban Nam Duan	Moo3

== Temple ==
Wang Thong subdistrict municipality is home to the following active temple, where Theravada Buddhism is practiced by local residents.

Temple name	Thai	Location
Wat Wang Thong Wararam	วัดวังทองวราราม	Moo1

== Education ==
The following elementary/secondary schools are located in the neighbourhood of Wang Thong subdistrict municipality.

- Wat Bang Saphan Prachanchananuson school - Moo4
- Wang Thong Phithayakhom school - Chai Nam subdistrict - Moo7

== Health ==
A community hospital Wang Thong Hospital is in neighboring village Moo5 with 68 beds.
There is also a community health center in neighboring village Moo13.

== Transportation ==
The subdistrict is the intersection of highway 11 southbound (Nakhon Sawan route), highway 12 westbound (Tak route), highway 12 eastbound (Khon Kaen route).
