= Luang pho phet =

The luang pho phet (Thai: หลวงพ่อเพชร) is a type of image of the Buddha found in Thailand. A luang pho phet depicts the Buddha in the Diamond Lotus Position.

== Notable luang pho phet images ==
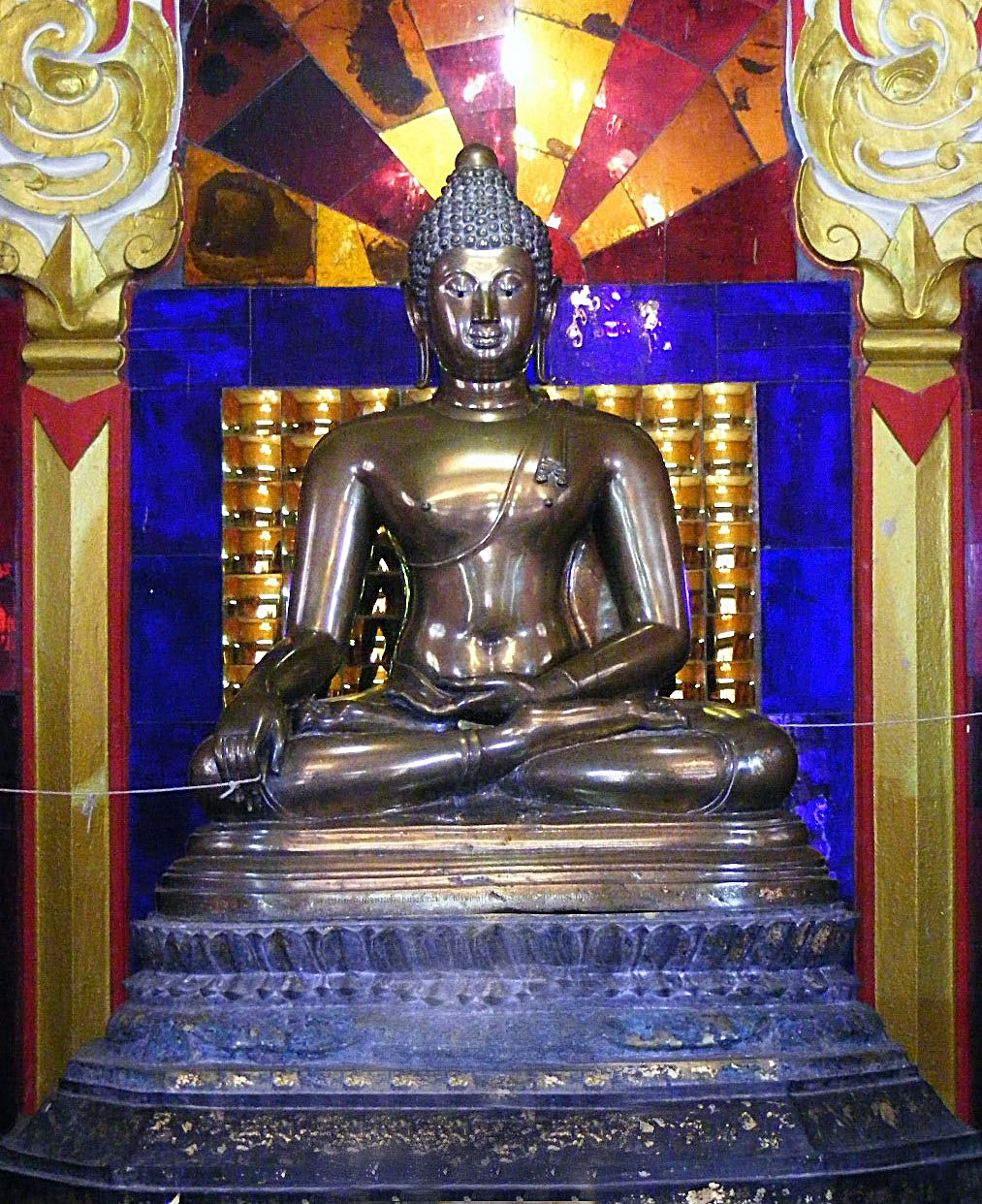
Luang pho phet at Wat Tha Thanon

Notable luang pho phet Buddha images include the luang pho phet of Uttaradit (in Wat Tha Thanon), the luang pho phet of Phichit (in Wat Tha Luang), and the luang pho phet of Nakhon Thai (in Wat Na Phra That). The luang pho phet in Uttaradit is believed to have been constructed between 800 and 900 years ago.

== luang pho phet in prayer ==
An English translation of a common Pali chant to be said before a luang pho phet image is as follows:

By body, by speech, and by mind, I will always revere the image named luang pho phet,
the Buddha statue, working wonders of psychic power. May I be blessed forevermore.

The text of the chant in Pali is as follows:

Kāyena vācāya va cetassa vā vajirang nāma pañimang iddhi-pāñihāriyakarang buddha-rūpang ahang vandāmi sabbaso; sadā sotthī bhavantu me.

== See also ==
- Buddha images in Thailand
