= Ban Phrao, Phitsanulok =

Ban Phrao บ้านพร้าว
- Tambon
- Interactive map of Ban Phrao
- Coordinates: 17°08′00″N 100°47′00″E
- Country: Thailand
- Province: Phitsanulok
- District: Nakhon Thai District

Population (2005)
  - Total: 6,428
- Time zone: UTC+7 (ICT)
- Postal code: 65120
- Geocode: 650210

Ban Phrao (Thai: บ้านพร้าว) is a sub-district in the Nakhon Thai District of Phitsanulok Province, Thailand.

== Geography ==
Ban Phrao lies in the Nan Basin, part of the Chao Phraya Watershed.

== Administration ==
The following is a list of the subdistrict's muban (villages):

| No. | English | Thai |
| 1 | Ban Nong Kradat | บ้านหนองกระดาษ |
| 2 | Ban Na Yao | บ้านนายาว |
| 3 | Ban Pa San | บ้านป่าซ่าน |
| 4 | Ban Fak Nam | บ้านฟากน้ำ |
| 5 | Ban Phrao | บ้านพร้าว |
| 6 | Ban Nam Lat | บ้านน้ำลัด |
| 7 | Ban Huai Sai | บ้านห้วยทราย |
| 8 | Ban Nam Khlat | บ้านน้ำคลาด |
| 9 | Ban Tha Kian Yai | บ้านตะเคียนใหญ่ |
| 10 | Ban Rong Yang | บ้านร้องยาง |
