= Na Bua =

Na Bua นาบัว
- Tambon
- Interactive map of Na Bua
- Coordinates: 17°12′00″N 100°53′00″E
- Country: Thailand
- Province: Phitsanulok
- District: Nakhon Thai District
- Elevation: 212 m (696 ft)

Population (2005)
  - Total: 8,000
- Time zone: UTC+7 (ICT)
- Postal code: 65120
- Geocode: 650205

Na Bua (Thai: นาบัว) is a subdistrict in the Nakhon Thai District of Phitsanulok Province, Thailand.

== Geography ==
Na Bua lies in the Nan Basin, which is part of the Chao Phraya Watershed.

== Administration ==
The following is a list of the subdistrict's mubans (villages):

No.	English	Thai
1	Ban Na Khlai	บ้านนาคล้าย
2	Ban Bung See Siat	บ้านบุ่งสีเสียด
3	Ban Non	บ้านโนน
4	Ban Na Bua	บ้านนาบัว
5	Ban Na Jan	บ้านนาจาน
6	Ban Nam Thuan	บ้านน้ำทวน
7	Ban Na Kai Khia	บ้านนาไก่เขี่ย
8	Ban Non Bueng	บ้านโนนบึง
9	Ban Nam Lom	บ้านน้ำลอม
10	Ban Na Khlo	บ้านนาคล้อ
11	Ban Rong Kok	บ้านร้องกอก
12	Ban Bung Hoi	บ้านบุ่งหอย
13	Ban Rai Phattana	บ้านไร่พัฒนา
14	Ban Nam Thon	บ้านน้ำตอน
15	Ban Nam Jaeng Phattana	บ้านน้ำแจ้งพัฒนา
