= Tha Sakae =

Tha Sakae ท่าสะแก
- Subdistrict
- District: Chat Trakan
- Province: Phitsanulok
- Country: Thailand

Population (2005)
  - Total: 5,145
- Time zone: UTC+7 (ICT)
- Postal code: 65170
- Geocode: 650306

Tha Sakae (Thai: ท่าสะแก) is a sub-district in the Chat Trakan District of Phitsanulok Province, Thailand.

== Geography ==
Tha Sakae lies in the Nan Basin, which is part of the Chao Phraya Watershed.

== Administration ==
The following is a list of the subdistrict's mubans, which roughly correspond to villages:

No.	English	Thai
1	Ban Nong Nam Po	บ้านหนองน้ำปอ
2	Ban Kon Song Salueng	บ้านขอนสองสลึง
3	Ban Noi	บ้านน้อย
4	Ban Tha Sakae	บ้านท่าสะแก
5	Ban Na Muang	บ้านนาม่วง
6	Ban Huai Thong Fan	บ้านห้วยท้องฟาน
7	Ban Huai Dee	บ้านห้วยดี
8	Ban Sri Chan	บ้านศรีจันทร์
9	Ban Nong Bua Kao	บ้านหนองบัวขาว

== Temples ==
The following is a list of active Buddhist temples in Tha Sakae:

- Wat Nong Nam Po (Thai: วัดหนองน้ำปอ) in Ban Nong Nam Po
- วัดนงราชธาราม in Ban Kon Song Salueng
- วัดโพนไทรงาม in Ban Noi
- วัดท่าสะแก in Ban Tha Sakae
- วัดศรีมงคลพัฒนาราม in Ban Huai Thong Fan
- Wat Nam Phing (Na Muang) (Thai: วัดน้ำผึ้ง (นาม่วง)) in Ban Na Muang
