= Bo Phak =

Bo Phak บ่อภาค
- Tambon
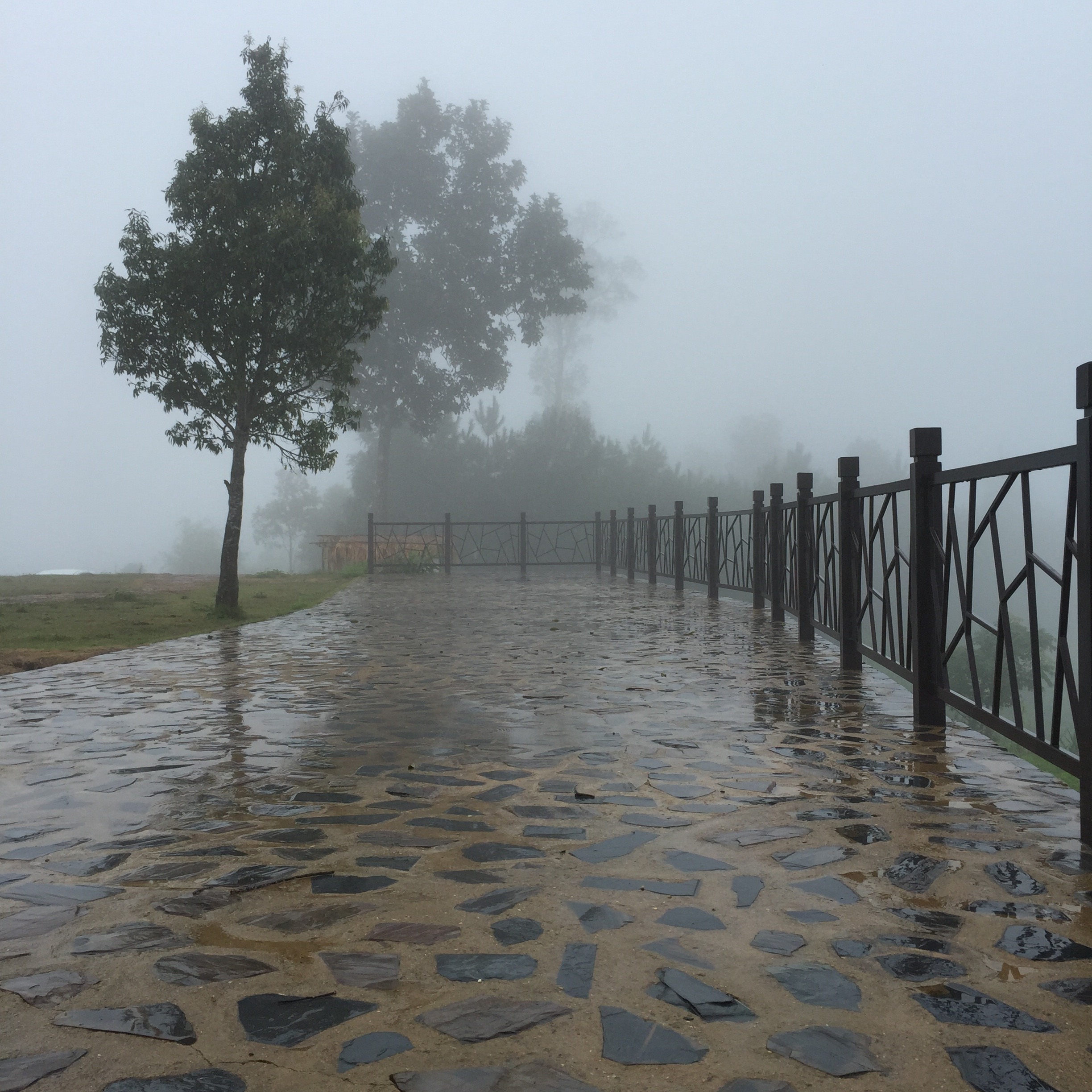
- Interactive map of Bo Phak
- Coordinates: 17°32′07″N 100°50′02″E
- Country: Thailand
- Province: Phitsanulok
- District: Chat Trakan

Population (2005)
  - Total: 7,751
- Time zone: UTC+7 (ICT)
- Postal code: 65170
- Geocode: 650305

Bo Phak (Thai: บ่อภาค) is a subdistrict in the Chat Trakan District of Phitsanulok Province, Thailand.

== Geography ==
Bo Phak lies in the Nan Basin, which is part of the Chao Phraya Watershed.

== Administration ==
The following is a list of the subdistrict's muban, which roughly correspond to the villages:

No.	English	Thai
1	Ban Nathon	บ้านนาตอน
2	Ban Kwat Nam Man	บ้านขวดน้ำมัน
3	Ban Lat Ruea	บ้านลาดเรือ
4	Ban Bo Phak Nuea (North Ban Bo Pak)	บ้านบ่อภาคเหนือ
5	Ban Bo Phak Thai (South Ban Bo Pak)	บ้านบ่อภาคใต้
6	Ban Rak Thai	บ้านรักไทย
7	Ban Nooch Thian	บ้านนุชเทียน
8	Ban Rom Gla	บ้านร่มเกล้า
9	Ban Chamnan Jui	บ้านชำนาญจุ้ย
10	Ban Thiat Chat	บ้านเทิดชาติ
11	Ban Man Sae Wong	บ้านมั่นแสวง
12	Ban Kun Nam Khap	บ้านขุนน้ำคับ
13	Ban Nam Juang	บ้านน้ำจวง
14	Ban Rak Chat	บ้านรักชาติ
15	Ban Songbasuk	บ้านสงบสุข

== Temples ==
The following is a list of active Buddhist temples in Bo Phak:

- Wat Nathon (Thai: วัดนาตอน) in Ban Nathon
- Wat Kwat Nam Man (Thai: วัดขวดน้ำมัน) in Ban Kwat Nam Man
- Wat Bo Phak (Thai: วัดบ่อภาค) in Ban Bo Phak
