= Suan Miang =

Suan Miang สวนเมี่ยง
- Tambon
- District: Chat Trakan
- Province: Phitsanulok
- Country: Thailand

Population (2005)
  - Total: 5,559
- Time zone: UTC+7 (ICT)
- Postal code: 65170
- Geocode: 650303

Suan Miang (Thai: สวนเมี่ยง) is a sub-district in Chat Trakan District of Phitsanulok Province, Thailand.

== Geography ==
Suan Miang lies in the Nan Basin, which is part of the Chao Phraya Watershed.

== Administration ==
The following is a list of the sub-district's muban, which roughly correspond to villages:

No.	English	Thai
1	Ban Suan Miang	บ้านสวนเมี่ยง
2	Ban Nong Kayang	บ้านหนองขาหย่าง
3	Ban Noi	บ้านน้อย
4	Ban Huai Chang Thaeng	บ้านห้วยช้างแทง
5	Ban Huai Mak Lam	บ้านห้วยหมากหล่ำ
6	Ban Khok Yai	บ้านโคกใหญ่
7	Ban Kaeng Bua Kham	บ้านแก่งบัวคำ
8	Ban Noen Chang Thaeng	บ้านเนินช้างแทง
9	Ban Noen Nong Bua	บ้านเนินหนองบัว
10	Ban Nong Chum Saeng	บ้านหนองชุมแสง

== Temples ==
Active Buddhist temples in Suan Miang:

- วัดสวนเมี่ยง in Ban Suan Miang
- วัดหนองขาหย่าง in Ban Nong Kayang
- วัดห้วยหมากกล่ำ in Ban Huai Mak Lam
- วัดโคกใหญ่ in Ban Khok Yai
- วัดแก่งบัวคำ in Ban Kaeng Bua Kham
- วัดห้วยช้างแทง in Ban Noen Chang Thaeng
- วัดเนินช้างแทง in Ban Noen Chang Thaeng
