= Ban Dong, Phitsanulok =

Ban Dong บ้านดง (English: Forest Village)
- Tambon
- Interactive map of Ban Dong
- Coordinates: 17.377020°N 100.483769°E
- District: Chat Trakan
- Province: Phitsanulok
- Country: Thailand

Population (2005)
  - Total: 7,809
- Time zone: UTC+7 (ICT)
- Postal code: 65170
- Geocode: 650304

Ban Dong (Thai: บ้านดง) is a subdistrict in the Chat Trakan District of Phitsanulok Province, Thailand.

== Geography ==
Ban Dong lies in the Nan Basin, which is part of the Chao Phraya Watershed.

== Administration ==
The following is a list of the subdistrict's muban, which roughly correspond to the villages:

No.	English	Thai
1	Ban Dong	บ้านดง
2	Ban Nayan	บ้านนาขาน
3	Ban Huai Nam Pla	บ้านห้วยน้ำปลา
4	Ban Na Lom	บ้านนาหล่ม
5	Ban Noen Thong	บ้านเนินทอง
6	Ban Nathajum	บ้านนาตาจูม
7	Ban Non Phayom	บ้านโนนพยอม
8	Ban Tha Suan Ya	บ้านท่าสวนยา
9	Ban Nam Thong Noi	บ้านน้ำทองน้อย
10	Ban Huai Nam Un	บ้านห้วยน้ำอุ่น
11	Ban Chum Saeng	บ้านชุมแสง
12	Ban Huai Nam Yen	บ้านห้วยน้ำเย็น
13	Ban Huai Thin Thok	บ้านห้วยตีนตก
14	Ban Mai Jayrin Sap	บ้านใหม่เจริญทรัพย์
15	Ban Noen Sawan	บ้านเนินสุวรรณ
16	Ban Noen Thong	บ้านเนินต้อง

== Temples ==
The following is a list of active Buddhist temples in Ban Dong:

- วัดบ้านดง in Ban Dong
- วัดนาหล่ม in Ban Na Lom
- วัดนาตาจูม in Ban Nathajum
- วัดซำหวาย in Ban Non Phayom
- วัดห้วยน้ำอุ่น in Ban Huai Nam Un
- วัดพรสวรรค์วราราม in Ban Huai Thin Thok
