= Pa Daeng =

Coordinates: 17°17′N 100°34′E

Pa Daeng ป่าแดง
- Tambon
- Interactive map of Pa Daeng
- District: Chat Trakan
- Province: Phitsanulok
- Country: Thailand

Population (2005)
  - Total: 7,774
- Time zone: UTC+7 (ICT)
- Postal code: 65170
- Geocode: 650301

Pa Daeng (Thai: ป่าแดง) is a sub-district in the Chat Trakan District of Phitsanulok Province, Thailand. The literal translation of the name is 'red forest', but the term refers to a forest of trees shedding their leaves.

== Geography ==
Pa Daeng lies in the Nan Basin, which is part of the Chao Phraya Watershed.

== Administration ==
The following is a list of the subdistrict's muban, which roughly correspond to villages:

No.	English	Thai
1	Ban Pa Daeng	บ้านป่าแดง
2	Ban Na	บ้านนา
3	Ban Thanoo Thong	บ้านธนูทอง
4	Ban Sai Ngam	บ้านไทรงาม
5	Ban Sri Songkhram	บ้านศรีสงคราม
6	Ban Rom Yen	บ้านร่มเย็น
7	Ban Nam Pak Noi	บ้านน้ำภาคน้อย
8	Ban Na Mueang	บ้านนาเมือง
9	Ban Huai Noen	บ้านห้วยเหิน
10	Ban Na Lom	บ้านนาล้อม
11	Ban Huan Tha Nuea	บ้านห้วนท่าเนื้อ
12	Ban Mai Thai Jayrin	บ้านใหม่ไทยเจริญ

== Temples ==
The following is a list of active Buddhist temples in Pa Daeng:

- Wat Pa Daeng (Thai: วัดป่าแดง) in Ban Pa Daeng
- Wat Ban Na (Thai: วัดบ้านนา) in Ban Na
- วัดบ้านน้อยโพธิ์ไทรงาม in Ban Thanoo Thong
- วัดน้ำภาคน้อย in Ban Nam Pak Noi
- วัดป่าห้วยเหิน in Ban Huai Noen
- วัดราชสามัคคีธรรม in Ban Na Lom
- วัดเวฬุวันประชาสัคค์ in Ban Na Lom
- Wat Mai Samakee (Na Lom) (Thai: วัดใหม่สามัคคี (นาล้อม)) in Ban Mai Thai Jayrin
