= Yang Klon =

Yang Klon ยางโกลน
- Tambon
- Interactive map of Yang Klon
- Coordinates: 17°11′00″N 100°55′00″E
- Country: Thailand
- Province: Phitsanulok
- District: Nakhon Thai District
- Elevation: 236 m (774 ft)

Population (2005)
  - Total: 5,056
- Time zone: UTC+7 (ICT)
- Postal code: 65120
- Geocode: 650208

Yang Klon (Thai: ยางโกลน) is a sub-district in the Nakhon Thai District of Phitsanulok Province, Thailand.

== Geography ==
Yang Klon lies in the Nan Basin, which is part of the Chao Phraya Watershed.

== Administration ==
The following is a list of the sub-district's mubans (villages):

No.	English	Thai
1	Ban Kok Kabak	บ้านกกกะบาก
2	Ban Nam Phrik	บ้านน้ำพริก
3	Ban Kok Mamong	บ้านกกมะโมง
4	Ban Yang Klon	บ้านยางโกลน
5	Ban Non Makha	บ้านโนนมะค่า
6	Ban Bung Tha Rot	บ้านบุ่งตารอด
7	Ban Bung Pla Fa	บ้านบุ่งปลาฝา
8	Ban Kok Muang	บ้านกกม่วง
9	Ban Nasam Wai	บ้านนาซำหวาย
10	Ban Fak Nam	บ้านฟากน้ำ
