= Nakhon Thai subdistrict =

Nakhon Thai นครไทย (English: Thai City)
- Tambon
- Interactive map of Nakhon Thai
- Coordinates: 17°07′00″N 100°50′00″E
- Country: Thailand
- Province: Phitsanulok
- District: Nakhon Thai District
- Elevation: 209 m (686 ft)

Population (2005)
  - Total: 10,236
- Time zone: UTC+7 (ICT)
- Postal code: 65120
- Geocode: 650201

Nakhon Thai (Thai: นครไทย) is a subdistrict in the Nakhon Thai District of Phitsanulok Province, Thailand.

== Geography ==
Nakhon Thai lies in the Nan Basin, which is part of the Chao Phraya Watershed.

== Administration ==
The following is a list of the subdistrict's mubans (villages):

| No. | English | Thai |
| 1 | Ban Nuea | บ้านเหนือ |
| 2 | Ban Noen Sawang | บ้านเนินสว่าง |
| 3 | Ban Nakhon Thai | บ้านนครไทย |
| 4 | Ban Nong Nam Sang | บ้านหนองน้ำสร้าง |
| 5 | Ban Nong Lan | บ้านหนองลาน |
| 6 | Ban Hua Rong | บ้านหัวร้อง |
| 7 | Ban Khlong Chik | บ้านคลองจิก |
| 8 | Ban Nam Phai | บ้านน้ำพาย |
| 9 | Ban Hua Che | บ้านหัวเซ |
| 10 | Ban Dan | บ้านด่าน |
| 11 | Ban Non Chan | บ้านโนนจันทร์ |
| 12 | Ban Sai Thong | บ้านสายทอง |
| 13 | Ban Mai Saen Suk | บ้านใหม่แสนสุข |

== Temples ==
The following is a list of temples in the Nakhon Thai subdisrict:

- Wat Na Phra That (Thai: วัดหน้าพระธาตุ) in Ban Nuea is a wooden building built on top of old ruins of a former temple building. It has a historic statue of a Luang Phor Phet inside an iron cage.
- Wat Nakhon Thai Wanaram (Thai: วัดนครไทยวราราม), colloquially Wat Hua Rong
- Wat Klang Sri Phutararam is a temple with ornate murals and a statue of Phokunbangklangtao.
- Wat Pawee Mok (Thai: วัดป่าวิโมกข์)
- Wat Nong Lan (Thai: วัดหนองลาน)
