= Noen Phoem =

Noen Phoem เนินเพิ่ม
- Tambon
- Interactive map of Noen Phoem
- Coordinates: 17°07′00″N 100°52′00″E
- Country: Thailand
- Province: Phitsanulok
- District: Nakhon Thai District
- Elevation: 208 m (682 ft)

Population (2005)
  - Total: 12,136
- Time zone: UTC+7 (ICT)
- Postal code: 65120
- Geocode: 650204

Noen Phoem (Thai: เนินเพิ่ม) is a subdistrict in the Nakhon Thai District of Phitsanulok Province, Thailand.

== Geography ==
Noen Phoem lies in the Nan Basin, which is part of the Chao Phraya Watershed.

== Administration ==
The following is a list of the subdistrict's muban, which roughly correspond to the villages:

No.	English	Thai
1	Ban Huai Teen Tang	บ้านห้วยตีนตั๋ง
2	Ban Noen Phoem	บ้านเนินเพิ่ม
3	Ban Suan Yang	บ้านสวนยาง
4	Ban Hua Na	บ้านหัวนา
5	Ban Pong Gacher	บ้านโป่งกะเฌอ
6	Ban Nong Haew	บ้านหนองแห้ว
7	Ban Hin Lat	บ้านหินลาด
8	Ban Khok	บ้านโคก
9	Ban Hua Mueang	บ้านหัวเมือง
10	Ban Rong Gla	บ้านร่องกล้า
11	Ban Noen Kham Pom	บ้านเนินขามป้อม
12	Ban Noen Toom	บ้านเนินตูม
13	Ban Lat Pha Thong	บ้านลาดผาทอง
14	Ban Phoem Nakhon	บ้านเพิ่มนคร
15	Ban Huai Nam Sai (part)	บ้านห้วยน้ำไซ
16	Ban Huai Nam Sai Tai (South Ban Huai Nam Chai)	บ้านห้วยน้ำไซใต้
17	Ban Nam Kamuen	บ้านน้ำขมึน
18	Ban Kaeng Om Sing	บ้านแก่งออมสิงห์
19	Ban Kaeng Thoet Phra Giat	บ้านแก่งเทิดพระเกียรติ
