= Huai Hia =

Huai Hia ห้วยเฮี้ย
- Tambon
- Interactive map of Huai Hia
- Coordinates: 16°55′00″N 100°54′00″E
- Country: Thailand
- Province: Phitsanulok
- District: Nakhon Thai District
- Elevation: 357 m (1,171 ft)

Population (2005)
  - Total: 6,357
- Time zone: UTC+7 (ICT)
- Postal code: 65120
- Geocode: 650211

Huai Hia (Thai: ห้วยเฮี้ย) is a subdistrict in the Nakhon Thai District of Phitsanulok Province, Thailand.

== Geography ==
Huai Hia is on a plateau in the Nan Basin, which is part of the Chao Phraya Watershed.

== Administration ==
The subdistrict's mubans, (villages):

No.	English	Thai
1	Ban Huai Kok	บ้านห้วยกอก
2	Ban Pa Khai	บ้านป่าคาย
3	Ban Huai Hia	บ้านห้วยเฮี้ย
4	Ban Sam Roo	บ้านซำรู้
5	Ban Lat Khue	บ้านลาดคื้อ
6	Ban Huai Sai Nuea	บ้านห้วยทรายเหนือ
7	Ban Kaeng Lat	บ้านแก่งลาด
8	Ban Tha Khian Thong	บ้านตะเคียนทอง
9	Ban Sap Sopa	บ้านทรัพย์โสภา
10	Ban Sam Phan	บ้านสัมพันธ์

== Economy ==
The economy of Huai Hia is based on agriculture.

== Attractions ==
Huai Hia's main attraction is its waterfalls:

- น้ำตกแก่งลาด
- น้ำตกแม่เด๊ะ
- น้ำตกแก่งทราย
- น้ำตกแก่งสะพุง
- น้ำตกแก่งกวางเน่า
- น้ำตกตาไก้
- น้ำตกตาดหมอก
