= Ban Yaeng =

Ban Yaeng บ้านแยง
- Tambon
- Interactive map of Ban Yaeng
- Coordinates: 16°53′00″N 100°48′00″E
- Country: Thailand
- Province: Phitsanulok
- District: Nakhon Thai District

Population (2005)
  - Total: 9,170
- Time zone: UTC+7 (ICT)
- Postal code: 65120
- Geocode: 650203

Ban Yaeng (Thai: บ้านแยง) is a subdistrict in the Nakhon Thai District of Phitsanulok Province, Thailand.

== Geography ==
Ban Yaeng lies in the Nan Basin, which is part of the Chao Phraya Watershed.

== Administration ==
The following is a list of the subdistrict's mubans (villages):

No.	English	Thai
1	Ban Yaeng	บ้านแยง
2	Ban Nong Hin	บ้านหนองหิน
3	Ban Tam Phrik	บ้านถ้ำพริก
4	Ban Khek Yai	บ้านเข็กใหญ่
5	Ban Gaset Suk	บ้านเกษตรสุข
6	Ban Pradoo Sin	บ้านประดู่สิน
7	Ban Gaset Sam Phan	บ้านเกษตรสัมพันธ์
8	Ban Pong Khae	บ้านโป่งแค
9	Ban Khek Glang	บ้านเข็กกลาง
10	Ban Gaset Sombun	บ้านเกษตรสมบูรณ์
11	Ban Thatsana Nakhon	บ้านทัศนานคร
12	Ban Khek Phattana	บ้านเข็กพัฒนา
13	Ban Bang Glang Thao Phattana	บ้านบางกลางท่าวพัฒนา

== Temples ==
Wat Ban Yaeng is home to the following Buddhist temples:

- Ban Yaeng Temple (วัดบ้านแยง) in muban 2
- Nong Hin Temple (วัดหนองหิน) in muban 4
- Samniang Rat Satthatham Temple (วัดสำเนียงราษฎร์ศรัทธาธรรม) in muban 5
- Kaset Suk Wanaram Temple (วัดเกษตรสุขวนาราม) in muban 12
- Mai Rat Satthatham Temple (วัดใหม่ราษฎร์ศรัทธาธรรม) in muban 3
- Huai Kok Temple (วัดห้วยกอก) in muban 1
- Huai Hia Temple (วัดห้วยเฮี้ย) in muban 3
- Ban Khek Yai Temple (วัดบ้านเข็กใหญ่) in muban 4
- Khek Mai Phatthanaram Temple (วัดเข็กใหม่พัฒนาราม) in muban 4
- Pa Khai Temple (วัดป่าคาย) in muban 2
- Sam Ru Temple (วัดซำรู้) in muban 4
