= Nakhon Chum, Phitsanulok =

Nakhon Chum นครชุม
- Tambon
- Interactive map of Nakhon Chum
- Coordinates: 17°16′00″N 100°49′00″E
- Country: Thailand
- Province: Phitsanulok
- District: Nakhon Thai District

Population (2005)
  - Total: 3,239
- Time zone: UTC+7 (ICT)
- Postal code: 65120
- Geocode: 650206

Nakhon Chum (Thai: นครชุม) is a subdistrict in the Nakhon Thai District of Phitsanulok Province, Thailand.

== Geography ==
Nakhon Chum lies in the Nan Basin, which is part of the Chao Phraya Watershed.

== Administration ==
The following is a list of the subdistrict's mubans (villages):

| No. | English | Thai |
| 1 | Ban Na Thung Yai | บ้านนาทุ่งใหญ่ |
| 2 | Ban Na Lan Kao | บ้านนาลานข้าว |
| 3 | Ban Na Mueang | บ้านนาเมือง |
| 4 | Ban Non Nason | บ้านโนนนาซอน |
| 5 | Ban Na Kum Khan | บ้านนาขุมคัน |
| 6 | Ban Na Gabak | บ้านนากะบาก |
| 7 | Ban Na Fong Daeng | บ้านนาฟองแดง |
| 8 | Ban Na That | บ้านนาตาด |

== Temples ==
The following is a list of temples in Nakhon Chum:

- Wat Na Mueang (วัดนาเมือง) in muban 3
- Wat Na Thung Yai (วัดนาทุ่งใหญ่) in muban 1
- Wat Na Lan Kao (วัดนาลานข้าว) in muban 2
- Wat Na Kum Khan (วัดนาขุนคัน) in muban 5
- Wat Na Fong Daeng (วัดนาฟองแดง) in muban 7
