= Chat Trakan subdistrict =

Coordinates: 17°17′N 100°36′E

Chat Trakan ชาติตระการ
- Tambon
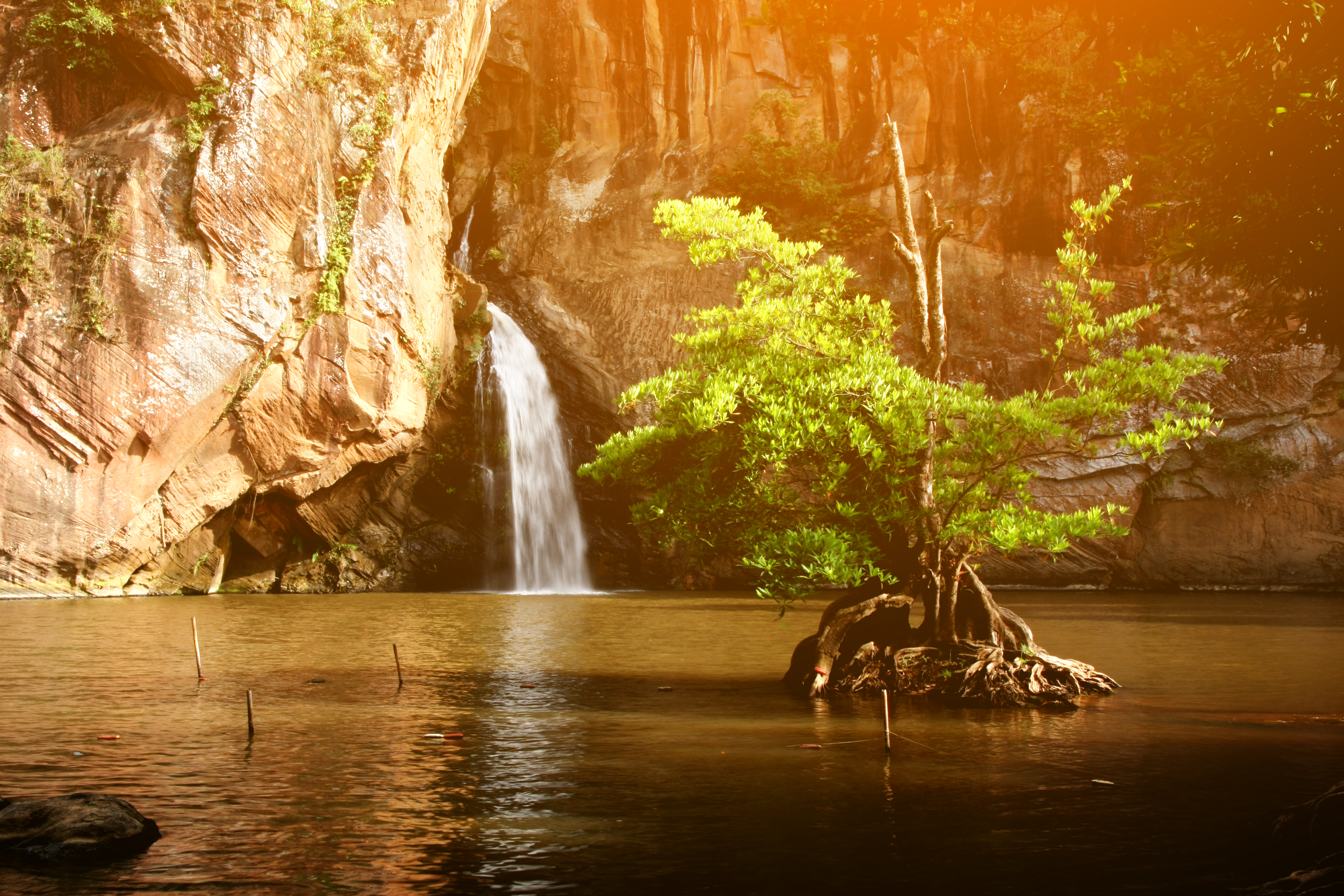
- Chat Trakan Waterfall, Namtok Chat Trakan National Park
- Interactive map of Chat Trakan
- District: Chat Trakan
- Province: Phitsanulok
- Country: Thailand

Population (2005)
  - Total: 4,608
- Time zone: UTC+7 (ICT)
- Postal code: 65170
- Geocode: 650302

Chat Trakan (Thai: ชาติตระการ) is a subdistrict in the Chat Trakan District of Phitsanulok Province, Thailand.

== Geography ==
Chat Trakan lies in the Nan Basin, which is part of the Chao Phraya Watershed.

== Administration ==
The following is a list of the subdistrict's muban, which roughly correspond to the villages:

No.	English	Thai
1	Ban Chat Trakan	บ้านชาติตระการ
2	Ban Napaya	บ้านนาเปอะ
3	Ban Pak Rong	บ้านปากรอง
4	Ban Na Chan	บ้านนาจาน
5	Ban Khok Phak Wan	บ้านโคกผักหวาน
6	Ban Chat Trakan	บ้านชาติตระการ
7	Ban Nam Phueng	บ้านน้ำพึง
8	Ban Pak Raet	บ้านปักแรด
9	Ban Na Noi	บ้านนาน้อย

== Temples ==
The following is a list of active Buddhist temples within Tambon Chat Trakan:

- Wat Chat Trakan (Thai: วัดชาติตระการ) in Ban Chat Trakan
- Wat Napaya (Thai: วัดนาเปอะ) in Ban Napaya
- Wat Pak Grong (Thai: วัดปากกรอง) in Ban Pak Rong
- Wat Khok Phak Wan (Thai: วัดโคกผักหวาน) in Ban Khok Phak Wan
- Wat Nam Pun (Thai: วัดน้ำปุ่น) in Ban Nam Phueng
- Wat Nan Chan (Thai: วัดนาจาน) in Ban Pak Raet
