= Khwae Noi River (Phitsanulok) =

River in Phitsanulok province, Thailand

Coordinates: 16°53′55.25″N 100°13′47.96″E

The Khwae Noi River (Thai: แม่น้ำแควน้อย, RTGS: Maenam Khwae Noi, pronounced [mɛ̂ː.náːm kʰwɛ̄ː nɔ́ːj]) in northern Thailand is a tributary of the Nan River. It shares the same name as another river in Thailand, the popular tourist attraction also known as "The River Kwai." These are two distinct bodies of water.

== Etymology ==
The first element khwae (Thai: แคว) means tributary. The second element noi (Thai: น้อย) means small.

== Geography ==
The river's source lies in the mountains of Chat Trakan District, Phitsanulok Province, within Namtok Chat Trakan National Park. From there, it flows past the agricultural lands of in the Chat Trakan District, and through the Wat Bot, Wang Thong and Phrom Phiram Districts. Finally, the Khwae Noi River joins the Nan River within Chom Thong, Mueang Phitsanulok District. The Khwae Noi River is part of the Chao Phraya River System which ultimately drains into the Gulf of Thailand.

== History ==
The Khwae Noi River has historically been a main waterway, highly significant to the residents of Phitsanulok Province and surrounding areas. The Khwae Noi River, along with the larger Nan River brought growth and prosperity and served as a communication route for Phitsanulok, and the two rivers gave rise to riparian ways of life which heavily influenced the simple traditional culture of the Thai people in the region.

== Tributaries ==
The principal tributaries of the Khwae Noi are the Om Sing River and the Fua River.

== Khwae Noi Dam Project ==
In recent times, due to climate change, the river has flooded during rainy seasons and damaging valuable farmland and also carrying too much water into the Nan (of which it is a tributary), thereby causing further damage. During the dry season, the water level has been too low, causing drought and harming the agricultural communities in its proximity. As a result of increasing problems with the flow of the river, the royally-initiated Khwae Noi Dam Project was begun in Wat Bot. Construction of the dam was completed in 2008.
