= Chat Trakan district =

Chat Trakan ชาติตระการ
- District
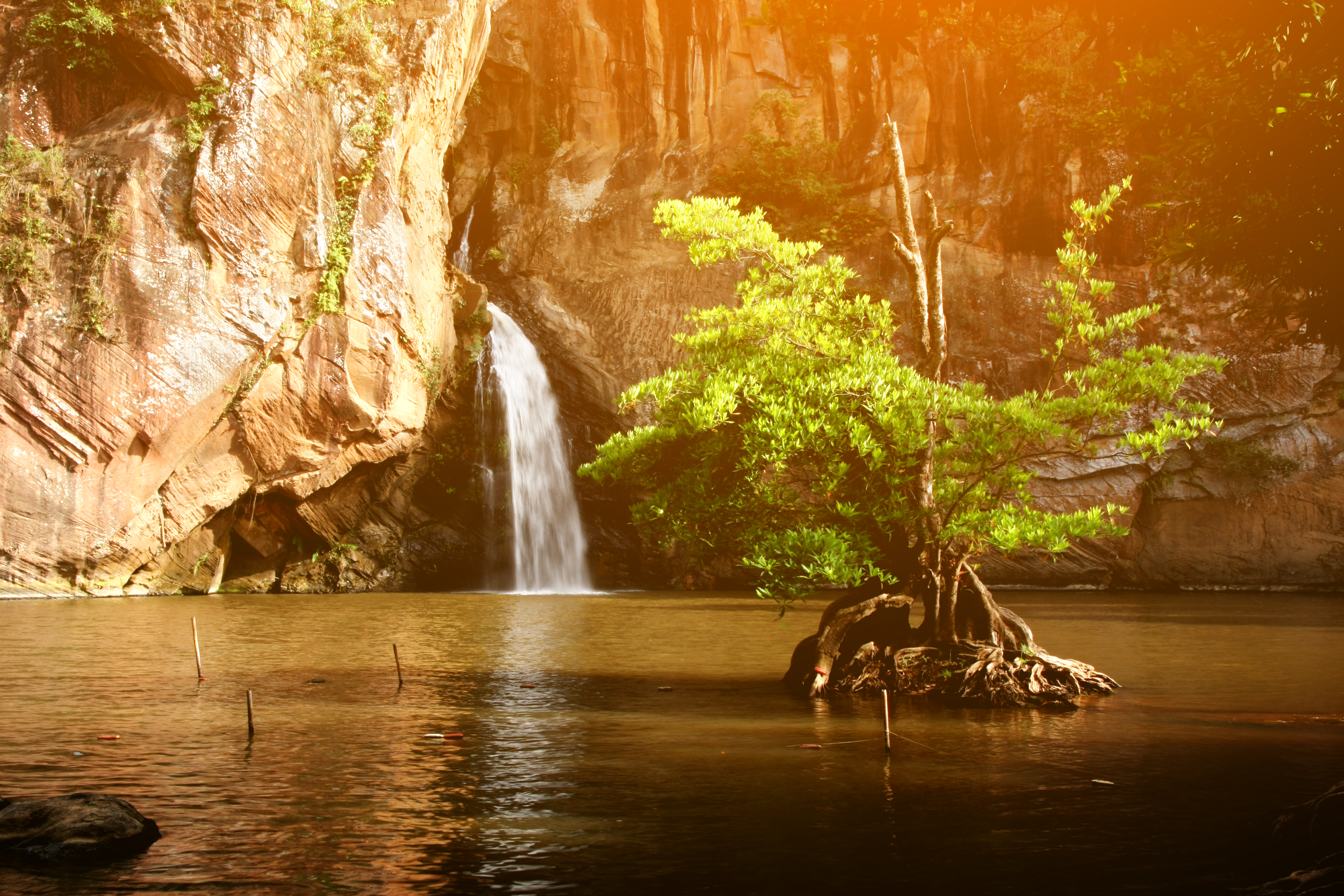
- Chat Trakan Waterfall

- District location in Phitsanulok province
- Coordinates: 17°16′36″N 100°35′57″E
- Country: Thailand
- Province: Phitsanulok
- Seat: Pa Daeng

Area
  - Total: 1,586.2 km^{2} (612.4 sq mi)

Population (2025)
  - Total: 41,550
  - Density: 26/km^{2} (67/sq mi)
- Time zone: UTC+7 (ICT)
- Postcode: 65170
- Calling code: 055
- ISO 3166 code: TH-6503
- LAO code: 01650301

Chat Trakan (Thai: ชาติตระการ, pronounced [t͡ɕʰâːt trā.kāːn]) is the northernmost district (amphoe) of Phitsanulok province, lower northern region of Thailand.

== History ==
Mueang Chat Trakan was an ancient city of the same era as Mueang Nakhon Thai. Originally part of Nakhon Thai District, it was made a minor district (king amphoe) on 1 May 1969, consisting of the two tambon Chat Trakan and Pa Daeng. It was upgraded to a full district on 1 April 1974. It was a scene of conflict in the Thai–Laotian Border War (December 1987 – February 1988.)

== Geography ==
Neighboring districts are (from the southeast clockwise) Na Haeo of Loei province, Nakhon Thai, Wang Thong, Wat Bot of Phitsanulok Province, Thong Saen Khan and Nam Pat of Uttaradit province. And to the east it borders Xaignabouli of Laos.

Chat Trakan lies within the Nan Basin, part of the Chao Phraya Watershed. The Khwae Noi River flows through Chat Trakan, as well as the lesser Kap (Thai: ลำน้ำคับ), Phak (Thai: ลำน้ำภาค) and Kleung (Thai: ลำน้ำคลึง) Rivers.

Namtok Chat Trakan National Park is in Chat Trakan District. The northeastern part of the district is in the southernmost prolongation of the Luang Prabang Range mountain area of the Thai highlands.

== Administration ==
=== Provincial government ===
The district is divided into six subdistricts (tambons), which are further subdivided into 72 villages (mubans), as of 2025: 41,550 people of 15,744 families.

No	Subdistrict	Population	Villages
1	Pa Daeng	8,084	12
2	Chat Trakan	4,605	9
3	Suan Miang	5,650	10
4	Ban Dong	8,250	16
5	Bo Phak	9,998	16
6	Tha Sakae	4,963	9
	Total population	41,550	72

=== Local government ===
There is one subdistrict municipality (thesaban tambon). Pa Daeng municipality covers villages 1 – 6, 8 of Pa Daeng, village 3 of Tha Sakae subdistricts.

Pa Daeng subdistrict municipality	Population
Pa Daeng subdistrict	4,308
Tha Sakae subdistrict	904
Total Population	5,212

Further there are six subdistrict administrative organizations (SAO). Pa Daeng and Tha Sakae SAO's cover the remaining areas of Pa Daeng and Tha Sakae subdistricts. The other four SAO's cover the whole same-named subdistrict.

== Temples ==
There are 36 active Buddhist temples in Chat Trakan.

== Economy ==
Chat Trakan is a district on the outskirts of Phitsanulok province, more than 90% of which is reserved forest area.

Therefore, Chat Trakan and two neighboring districts, Nakhon Thai and Wat Bot, have the lowest prosperity index in Phitsanulok, lowest household income and highest household debt.
