= Nakhon Thai district =

Nakhon Thai นครไทย
- District
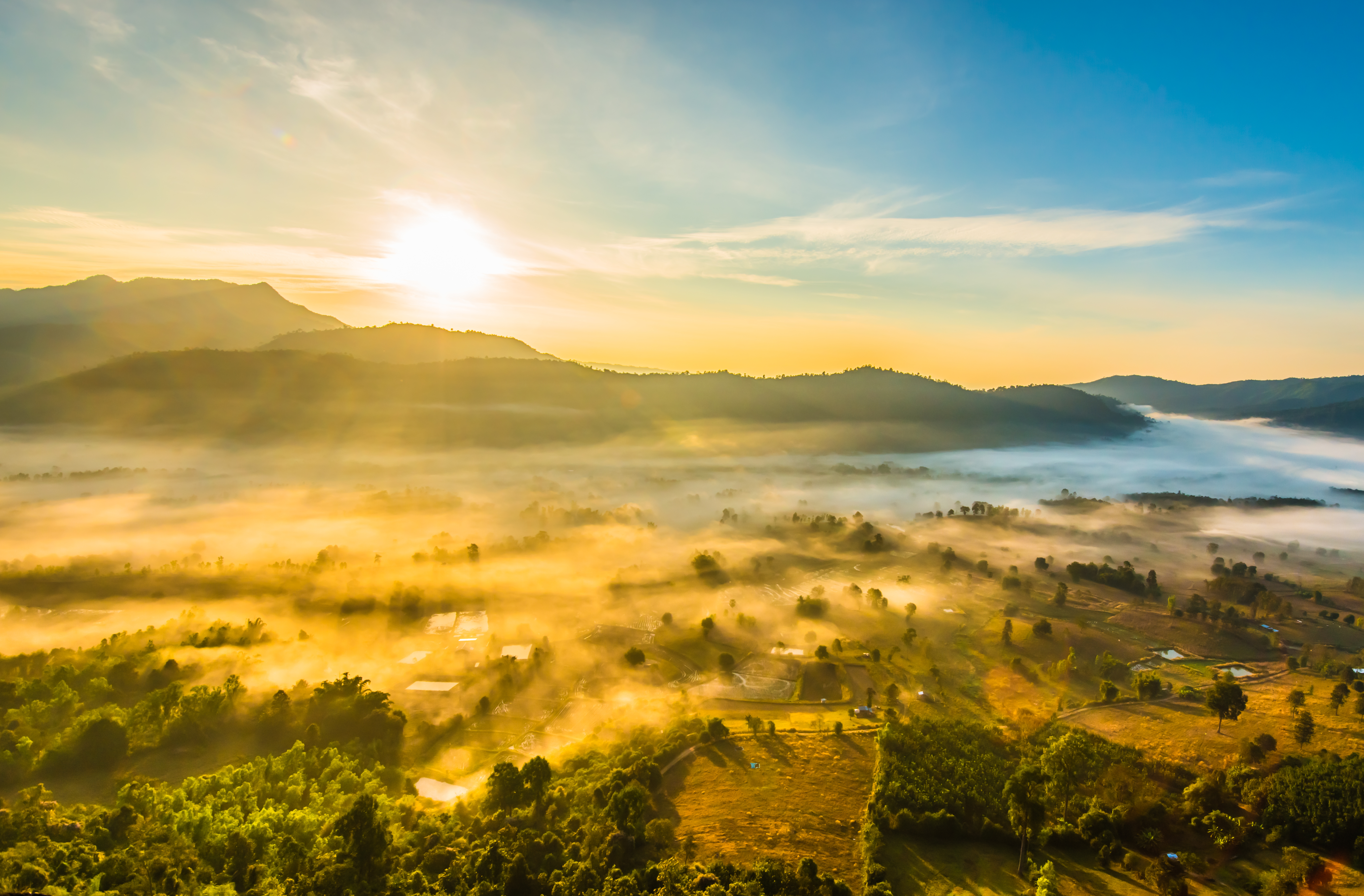
- A scenery of Phu Hin Rong Kla National Park in Nakhon Thai

- District location in Phitsanulok province
- Country: Thailand
- Province: Phitsanulok

Area
  - Total: 2,220.3 km^{2} (857.3 sq mi)

Population (2025)
  - Total: 84,491
  - Density: 38/km^{2} (98/sq mi)
- Time zone: UTC+7 (ICT)
- Postcode: 65120
- Calling code: 055
- ISO 3166 code: TH-6502
- LAO code: 01650201

Nakhon Thai (Thai: นครไทย, pronounced [ná(ʔ).kʰɔ̄ːn tʰāj]) is a district (amphoe) in the eastern part of Phitsanulok province, lower northern region of Thailand.

== Geography ==
Neighboring districts are (from the southwest clockwise), Wang Thong and Chat Trakan of Phitsanulok Province; Na Haeo and Dan Sai of Loei province; and Khao Kho of Phetchabun province.

Phu Hin Rong Kla National Park is in Nakhon Thai District.

Nakhon Thai lies within the Nan Basin, which is part of the Chao Phraya Watershed. The Khwae Noi River flows through the district, as well as the lesser Fia (Thai: ลำน้ำเฟี้ย) and Kaem (Thai: ลำน้ำแขม) Rivers.

== Administration ==
=== Provincial government ===
The district is divided into 11 subdistricts (tambons), which are further subdivided into 145 villages (mubans), as of 2025: 84,491 people of 34,247 families.

No	Subdistrict	Population	Villages
1	Nakhon Thai	8,591	13
2	Nong Kathao	15,930	27
3	Ban Yaeng	10,091	13
4	Noen Phoem	12,312	19
5	Na Bua	7,701	15
6	Nakhon Chum	2,903	8
7	Nam Kum	2,358	7
8	Yang Klon	4,768	10
9	Bo Pho	6,765	13
10	Ban Phrao	6,016	10
11	Huai Hia	7,056	10
	Total population	84,491	145

=== Local government ===
There are two subdistrict municipalities (thesaban tambon), Ban Yaeng and Nakhon Thai municipalities cover the whole same-named subdistrict.

Subdistrict municipality	Population
Ban Yaeng	10,091
Nakhon Thai	8,591

Further there are nine subdistrict administrative organizations (SAO) that cover the whole same-named subdistrict.

== Temples ==
There are 23 Buddhist temples in Nakhon Thai.

== Economy ==
Nakhon Thai is a district on the outskirts of Phitsanulok province, more than 80% of which is reserved forest area.

Therefore, Nakhon Thai and two neighboring districts, Chat Trakan and Wat Bot, have the lowest prosperity index in Phitsanulok, lowest household income and highest household debt.
